= Blue October discography =

- Studio albums: 13
- Extended plays: 2
- Live albums: 5
- Singles: 25
- Video albums: 2
- Music videos: 22

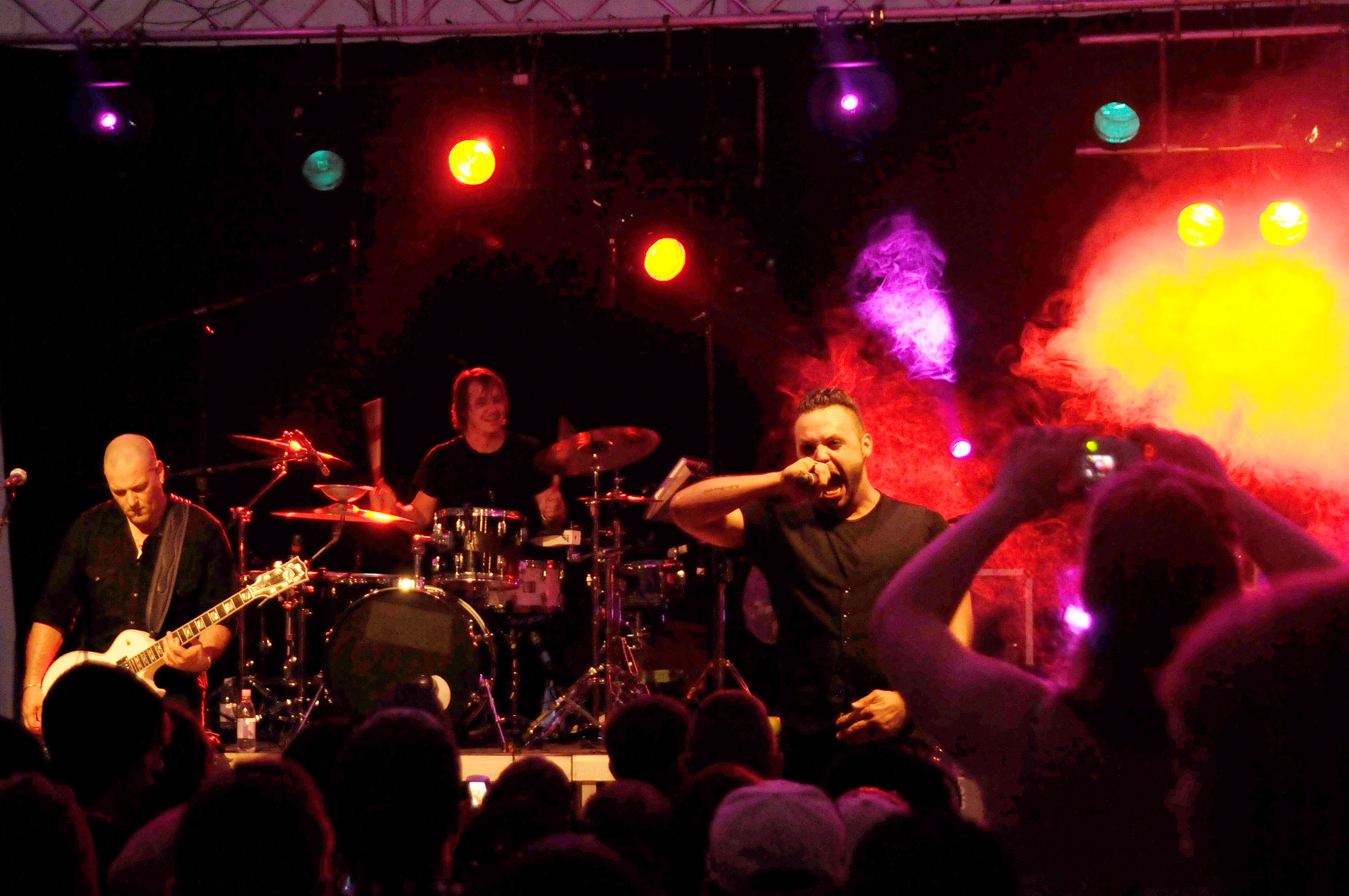
Blue October in 2009

The discography of Blue October, an American rock band, consists of thirteen studio albums, six live albums, three video albums, two extended plays, two box sets, twenty-five singles and twenty-two music videos.

== Albums ==
=== Studio albums ===
List of studio albums, with selected chart positions and certifications
Title	Album details	Peak chart positions						Certifications
Title	Album details	US	US Alt.	US Rock	CAN	GER	NZ	Certifications
The Answers	Released: January 3, 1998 (US); Label: Scoop Records; Formats: CD, LP, cassette, digital download	—	—	—	—	—	—	
Consent to Treatment	Released: August 15, 2000 (US); Label: Universal / Listen Up Records; Formats: CD, LP, cassette, digital download	—	—	—	—	—	—	
History for Sale	Released: April 8, 2003 (US); Label: Brando/Universal / Universal; Formats: CD, LP, digital download	—	—	—	—	—	—	
Foiled	Released: April 4, 2006 (US); Label: Universal; Formats: CD, cassette, digital download	29	—	8	21	—	40	RIAA: Platinum; MC: Platinum
Approaching Normal	Released: March 24, 2009 (US); Label: Universal; Formats: CD, LP, digital download	13	4	5	—	—	—	
Any Man in America	Released: August 16, 2011 (US); Label: RED; Formats: CD, LP, digital download	8	1	1	—	100	—	
Sway	Released: August 20, 2013 (US); Label: Up/Down; Formats: CD, LP, digital download	13	1	3	—	—	—	
Home	Released: April 22, 2016 (US); Label: Up/Down, Brando; Formats: CD, LP, digital download	19	1	1	—	—	—	
I Hope You're Happy	Released: August 17, 2018 (US); Label: Up/Down, Brando; Formats: CD, LP, digital download	28	3	4	—	—	—	
This Is What I Live For	Released: October 23, 2020 (US); Label: Up/Down, Brando; Formats: CD, LP, digital download	102	10	19	—	—	—	
Spinning the Truth Around (Part I)	Released: October 14, 2022; Label: Up/Down, Brando; Formats: CD, LP, digital download	—	—	—	—	—	—	
Spinning the Truth Around (Part II)	Released: October 13, 2023; Label: Up/Down, Brando; Formats: CD, LP, digital download	—	—	—	—	—	—	
Happy Birthday	Released: December 14, 2024; Label: Up/Down, Brando; Formats: streaming, digital download	—	—	—	—	—	—	
Everything We Lost In The Fire	Released: 2026 (forthcoming); Label: Up/Down, Brando; Formats: CD, LP, digital download	—	—	—	—	—	—	
"—" denotes a recording that did not chart or was not released in that territory.

=== Live albums ===
List of live albums, with selected chart positions
Title	Album details	Peak chart positions		
Title	Album details	US	US Alt.	US Rock
Argue with a Tree...	Released: September 15, 2004 (US); Label: Universal, Brando; Formats: CD, digital download	—	—	—
Live at Lollapalooza 2006	Released: September 19, 2006 (US); Formats: Digital download	—	—	—
Foiled for the Last Time / Teach Your Baby Well	Released: September 25, 2007 (US); Label: Universal; Formats: CD, digital download	106	—	—
Ugly Side: An Acoustic Evening with Blue October	Released: May 10, 2011 (US); Label: Up/Down, Brando; Formats: CD, digital download	79	12	22
Things We Do at Night (Live from Texas)	Released: November 10, 2015 (US); Label: Up/Down, Brando; Formats: CD, digital download	175	12	20
Live From Manchester	Released: November 29, 2019 (US); Label: Up/Down, Brando; Formats: CD, LP, digital download	—	—	—
Storytelling	Released: 2026(US); Label: Up/Down, Brando; Formats: LP, DVD	—	—	—
"—" denotes a recording that did not chart or was not released in that territory.

=== Video albums ===
List of video albums
Title	Album details
Argue with a Tree...	Released: February 22, 2005 (US); Label: Universal; Formats: DVD
Things We Do at Night (Live from Texas)	Released: November 20, 2015 (US); Label: Up/Down, Brando; Formats: DVD, Blu-ray
Storytelling	Released: 2026 (US); Label: Up/Down, Brando; Formats: DVD

=== Box Sets ===
List of box sets
Title	Album details
Collected Series: 1998–2004	Released: 2024; Label: Up/Down, Brando; Formats: LP
Collected Series: 2006–2011	Released: 2026; Label: Up/Down, Brando; Formats: LP

== Extended plays ==
List of extended plays
Title	EP details
Foiled Again	Released: December 5, 2006 (US); Label: Universal; Formats: CD, digital download
Debris	Released: August 22, 2013 (US); Label: Up/Down; Formats: Digital download

== Singles ==
List of singles, with selected chart positions and certifications, showing year released and album name
Title	Year	Peak chart positions										Certifications	Album
Title	Year	US	US Adult	US Alt.	US Main. Rock	US Pop	US Rock	CAN	CAN Rock	GER	LUX	Certifications	Album
"James"	2000	—	—	—	—	—	—	—	—	—	—		Consent to Treatment
"Breakfast After 10"	2000	—	—	—	—	—	—	—	—	—	—		Consent to Treatment
"Calling You"	2003	—	35	—	—	—	—	—	—	—	—		History for Sale
"Razorblade"	2003	—	—	—	—	—	—	—	—	—	—		History for Sale
"Hate Me"	2006	31	13	2	21	17	—	— (Note: "Hate Me" did not enter the Billboard Canadian Hot 100, but peaked at number five on the Canadian Digital Song Sales chart.)	4	—	—	RIAA: Platinum	Foiled
"Into the Ocean"	2006	53	10	20	—	39	—	19	—	—	—	RIAA: Platinum	Foiled
"She's My Ride Home"	2007	—	—	—	—	—	—	—	—	—	—		Foiled
"X Amount of Words"	2007	—	—	—	—	—	—	—	—	—	—		Foiled
"Calling You" (Remix)	2007	— (Note: "Calling You" (Remix) did not enter the Billboard Hot 100, but peaked at number 14 on the Bubbling Under Hot 100 Singles chart.)	17	—	—	36	—	—	—	—	—		Foiled for the Last Time
"Dirt Room"	2008	—	—	7	31	—	—	—	37	—	—		Approaching Normal
"Say It"	2009	—	29	28	—	—	44	—	—	—	—		Approaching Normal
"Jump Rope"	2009	—	—	—	—	—	—	—	—	65	8		Approaching Normal
"Should Be Loved"	2010	—	31	—	—	—	—	—	—	—	—		Approaching Normal
"The Chills"	2011	—	—	27	—	—	46	—	—	—	—		Any Man in America
"The Feel Again (Stay)"	2011	—	—	—	—	—	—	—	—	—	—		Any Man in America
"The Worry List"	2012	—	—	—	—	—	—	—	—	—	—		Any Man in America
"The Scar"	2012	—	—	—	—	—	—	—	—	—	—		Non-album single
"Bleed Out"	2013	—	—	22	—	—	— (Note: "Bleed Out" did not enter the Hot Rock Songs chart, but peaked at number 30 on the Rock Airplay chart.)	—	—	—	—		Sway
"Angels in Everything"	2013	—	—	—	—	—	—	—	—	—	—		Sway
"Sway"	2014	—	—	—	—	—	—	—	—	—	—		Sway
"Fear"	2014	—	—	—	—	—	—	—	—	—	—		Sway
"Home"	2015	—	27	—	—	—	38	—	—	—	—		Home
"I Want It"	2016	—	35	—	—	—	—	—	—	—	—		Home
"I Hope You're Happy"	2018	— (Note: "I Hope You're Happy" did not enter the Billboard Hot 100, but peaked at number 34 on the Digital Song Sales chart.)	35	15	—	—	13	—	—	—	—		I Hope You're Happy
"Daylight"	2018	—	—	25	—	—	—	—	—	—	—		I Hope You're Happy
"How to Dance in Time"	2019	—	—	—	—	—	—	—	—	—	—		I Hope You're Happy
"King"	2019	—	—	36	—	—	—	—	—	—	—		I Hope You're Happy
"Oh My My"	2020	—	30	12	—	—	— (Note: "Oh My My" did not enter the Rock Songs chart, but peaked at number 4 on the Rock Digital Songs chart.)	—	—	—	—		This Is What I Live For
"Moving On (So Long)"	2020	—	—	—	—	—	—	—	—	—	—		This Is What I Live For
"The Girl Who Stole My Heart"	2021	—	—	—	—	—	—	—	—	—	—		Spinning the Truth Around, Pt. 1
"Spinning the Truth Around"	2022	—	—	—	—	—	—	—	—	—	—		Spinning the Truth Around, Pt. 1
"Where Did You Go I'm Less of a Mess These Days"	2022	—	—	18	—	—	—	—	—	—	—		Spinning the Truth Around, Pt. 1
"Shut Up I Want You to Love Me Back"	2022	—	—	—	—	—	—	—	—	—	—		Spinning the Truth Around, Pt. 1
"Down Here Waiting"	2023	—	—	22	—	—	—	—	—	—	—		Spinning the Truth Around, Pt. 2
"Everything We Lost in the Fire"	2024	—	—	30	—	—	—	—	—	—	—		Non-album single
"Hot Stuff"	2025	—	—	17	—	—	—	—	—	—	—		Non-album single
"Congratulations" (feat. Imogen Heap) "18th Floor Balcony"	2026	—	—	—	—	—	—	—	—	—	—		Foiled
"—" denotes a recording that did not chart or was not released in that territory.

== Music videos ==
List of music videos, showing year released and director
Title	Year	Director(s)
"Calling You"	2003	The Saline Project
"Razorblade"	2005	King Hollis
"Hate Me"	2006	Kevin Kerslake
"Into the Ocean"	2006	Zach Merck
"Calling You" (Remix)	2007	Jeff Richter
"Dirt Room"	2009	Kevin Kerslake
"Say It"	2009	Kevin Kerslake
"Jump Rope"	2009	PrettyMonkeyStudio
"Should Be Loved"	2010	Nadia O'Bryan
"The Chills"	2011	Jeff Ray
"The Feel Again (Stay)"	2011	Merritt Fields
"The Worry List"	2012	Lior Reuveni
"Bleed Out"	2013	Norry Niven
"Angels in Everything"	2013	Bongani Mlambo
"Sway"	2014	Bongani Mlambo
"Fear" (Phil Tan Remix)	2014	Norry Niven
"Home"	2016	Norry Niven
"I Hope You're Happy"	2018	Zach Merck
"Daylight"	2018	Zach Merck
"Oh My My"	2020	Johnny Chew
"Moving On (So Long)"	2020	Unknown
"We Know Where You Go"	2022	Justin Furstenfield & Manny Fresco
"Spinning the Truth Around"	2022	Zach Merck
"Where Did You Go I'm Less Of A Mess These Days"	2022	Unknown
"Shut Up I Want You to Love Me Back"	2022	Unknown
"How Can You Love Me If You Don't Even Like Me"	2022	Unknown
"Down Here Waiting"	2023	Zach Merck
"Sideways"	2024	Unknown
"Congratulations" "18th Floor Balcony" "She's My Ride Home"	2026	Zach Merck
