= Foiled for the Last Time =

Live album by Blue October
- Released: September 25, 2007
- Recorded: Stubb's, Austin, Texas; March 24, 2007
- Genre: Alternative rock
- Length: 76:19 (Disc 1); 68:52 (Disc 2)
- Label: Universal
- Producers: David Castell and Justin Furstenfeld

Blue October chronology
Foiled (2006)	Foiled for the Last Time (2007)	Approaching Normal (2009)

Singles from Foiled For The Last Time
- 1. "Hate Me" Released: July 1, 2006; 2. "Into the Ocean" Released: October 16, 2006; 3. "She's My Ride Home" Released: May 22, 2007; 4. "X Amount Of Words" Released: 2007; 5. "Calling You (remix)" Released: 2007

Professional ratings
Review scores
Source	Rating
Allmusic	3.5/5 stars
Houston Chronicle	3/4 stars

Foiled for the Last Time is a two disc set by Blue October released by Universal Records on September 25, 2007. It contains an extended version of Foiled and a live recording disc.

The first disc, titled Foiled +, contains the complete Foiled album, a re-recorded version of the band's hit song "Calling You" from their History for Sale album and two previously unreleased remixes of "X-Amount Of Words", one each by Paul Oakenfold and Carmen Rizzo.

The live disc, titled Teach Your Baby Well Live, was recorded at Stubb's in Austin, Texas, on March 24, 2007. The concert was the first time that the songs "Let it Go" and "Angel" had been performed during a concert on the Teach Your Baby Well tour.

"Congratulations" is the only song from Foiled that was not played at the concert, it was replaced with their Consent to Treatment song "Angel", which was one of Blue October's most popular songs that was not included on their previous live album Argue With a Tree.... Inexplicably, the live disc is censored, but the Foiled + disc is not. In 2026 Teach Your Baby Well was released on orange and black smoke vinyl as part of the Collected Series 2006–2011 box set.

== "Foiled +" track listing ==
1. "You Make Me Smile" – 4:21
2. "She's My Ride Home" – 4:41
3. "Into the Ocean" – 3:59
4. "What If We Could" – 4:03
5. "Hate Me" – 6:20
6. "Let It Go" – 4:03
7. "Congratulations" (feat. Imogen Heap) – 4:01
8. "Overweight" – 4:24
9. "X Amount of Words" – 4:14
10. "Drilled a Wire Through My Cheek" – 4:32
11. "Sound of Pulling Heaven Down" – 4:42
12. "Everlasting Friend" – 4:05
13. "18th Floor Balcony" – 4:32
14. "Calling You" – 3:48
15. "X Amount Of Words (Paul Oakenfold Remix)" – 4:08
16. "X Amount Of Words (Carmen Rizzo Remix)" – 5:46
17. "It's Just Me" [Hidden Track] - 4:40

== "Teach Your Baby Well Live" track listing ==
1. "For My Mother" - 1:38
2. "You Make Me Smile" - 5:48
3. "Sound of Pulling Heaven Down" - 4:00
4. "What if We Could" - 4:21
5. "She's My Ride Home" - 5:27
6. "Let It Go" - 4:39
7. "Angel" - 4:24
8. "Drilled a Wire Through My Cheek" - 4:54
9. "Everlasting Friend" - 4:58
10. "Into The Ocean" - 4:15
11. "18th Floor Balcony" - 5:01
12. "Overweight" - 5:26
13. "X Amount of Words" - 7:28
14. "Hate Me" - 6:33

== Full concert set list ==
The following songs were played at the concert but only the fourteen of them that didn't appear on the band's previous live album, Argue with a Tree, were included on the Teach Your Baby Well album.

1. "For My Mother"
2. "You Make Me Smile"
3. "Sound of Pulling Heaven Down"
4. "What if We Could"
5. "Clumsy Card House"
6. "She's My Ride Home"
7. "Balance Beam"
8. "Inner Glow"
9. "Let it Go"
10. "Angel"
11. "Drilled a Wire Through My Cheek"
12. "Somebody"
13. "Chameleon Boy"
14. "Everlasting Friend"
15. "Come in Closer"
16. "Into the Ocean"
17. "18th Floor Balcony"
18. "Overweight"
19. "X Amount of Words"
20. "Hate Me"
