= Open book =

Open book may refer to:

== Books and publishing ==
- An Open Book (poems), a collection by Orson Scott Card
- Open access books
- PEN/Open Book, a program fostering diversity in publishing
- An Open Book, an autobiography by Monica Dickens
- An Open Book, an autobiography by John Huston
- An Open Book, a memoir by Ruth Gordon
- Open Book, a memoir by Jessica Simpson (2020)
- Open Book: Not Quite A Memoir (2022), a memoir by Indian actress Kubbra Sait

== Computing and networking ==
- Openbook (website), a Facebook-specific search engine
- OPeNBooK Co., Ltd., a video game developer
- Networked book, a book designed to be written, edited, and read in a networked environment
- VIA OpenBook, a laptop reference design
- Openbook, an online navigational envelope developed by National Academies Press
- OpenBook, a Freedom Scientific document scanning and reading application for low-vision users.
- OPEN BOOK, a Unicode symbol

== TV and radio ==
- "Open Book" (Steven Universe), an episode of Steven Universe
- "An Open Book," a Six Feet Under episode
- Open Book (radio), a BBC Radio 4 programme about books

== Music ==
- Open Book (Da' T.R.U.T.H. album)
- Open Book (Fatherson album)
- Open Book, an album by Evelyn King
- Open Book, an album by The Lemon Trees
- Songs from an Open Book, an album by Justin Furstenfeld
- Open Book Winter Album, a live album by Justin Furstenfeld
- Open Book, an EP by Jessica Simpson

=== Songs ===
- "Open Book," a song by Cake on the album Fashion Nugget
- "Open Book," a song by Gnarls Barkley on the album The Odd Couple
- "Open Book," a song by Ed Harcourt on the album Strangers
- "Open Book," a song by The Rakes on the album Capture/Release; appears in Rayman Raving Rabbids: TV Party
- "Open Book," a song by Cock Robin on the album Collection Gold
- "Open Book," a song by Sacred Reich on the album Independent

== Other uses ==
- Open Book (Tahquitz), a technical rock climbing route at Tahquitz Rock, California
- Open-book accounting
- Open-book contract
- Open book decomposition
- Open-book management
- Open Book, a center for literary and visual arts co-founded by the Minnesota Center for Book Arts
- Open Book, a blog by Amy Welborn
- Open book, a climbing term
- Open book fracture, a type of pelvic fracture

== See also ==
- Open book test
- The Open Book, a 2009 album
- The Open Book (play), a 1920 play
