= Things We Do at Night (Live from Texas) =

Things We Do At Night (Live From Texas)

Live album / Concert film by Blue October
- Released: November 20, 2015
- Recorded: November 28–29, 2014
- Genre: Alternative rock
- Label: Up/Down, Brando

Blue October chronology
Sway (2013)	Things We Do At Night (Live From Texas) (2015)	Home (2016)

Things We Do At Night (Live From Texas) is a live album and concert film by American rock band Blue October. It is their second concert film, fourth live album, and eleventh album overall. The album was recorded over Thanksgiving weekend, November 28–29, 2014 at the House of Blues in Dallas, Texas, United States.

The set features fan favorites and hit songs from albums Foiled, Approaching Normal, Any Man in America, and Sway, representing material released since the band's previous concert film Argue with a Tree..... The album was released on Blue October's label Up/Down Records, distributed by Megaforce Records, and made available digitally and on CD, DVD and Blu-ray formats on November 20, 2015. The album is named after the song "Things We Do At Night" from the Sway album, which the band used as a closing song during the Sway tour.

The album reached number 175 on the Billboard 200, number 12 on the Alternative Albums chart, number 20 on the Rock Albums Chart, and number 9 on the Independent Albums Chart.

== Track listing ==
1. To Be
2. Sway
3. She's My Ride Home
4. Say It
5. Light You Up
6. Congratulations
7. Into the Ocean
8. Should Be Loved
9. Fear
10. Debris
11. The Getting Over It Part
12. Dirt Room
13. The End
14. Everything (AM Limbo) / The Feel Again (Stay)
15. The Worry List
16. Hate Me
17. X Amount of Words
18. Not Broken Anymore
19. Bleed Out
20. Things We Do At Night
21. Home / Breathe, It's Over / Credits (DVD and Blu-ray)

== Personnel ==
- Justin Furstenfeld – lead vocals, guitar
- Jeremy Furstenfeld – drums, vocals
- Matt Noveskey – bass guitar, vocals
- C.B. Hudson – guitar, vocals
- Ryan Delahoussaye – mandolin, violin, keyboard, vocals
- Alan Adams – percussion
- Paul Logus – mastering

== Charts ==
Chart (2015)	Peak position
US Billboard 200	175
