= Calling You (Blue October song) =

Single by Blue October

from the album History for Sale
- Released: June 17, 2003; 2007 (remix)
- Genre: Alternative rock; post-grunge
- Length: 3:58
- Label: Brando; Universal
- Songwriter: Justin Furstenfeld
- Producers: David Castell; Justin Furstenfeld

Blue October singles chronology
"James" (2000)	"Calling You" (2003)	"Hate Me" (2006)
She's My Ride Home (2006)	Calling You (Remix) (2007)	Dirt Room (2008)

Music videos
- "Calling You" (first version) on YouTube
- "Calling You" (second version) on YouTube

"Calling You" is a song by American alternative rock band Blue October. It was initially released in 2003 as the only single from the album History for Sale, peaking at number 35 on the Hot Adult Top 40 Tracks chart. It later gained a resurgence of popularity and radio play after it was included on the American Wedding soundtrack. It was, for a time, the group's largest mainstream hit until "Hate Me" peaked at number 31 on the Billboard Hot 100 in 2006.

In July 2007, the song was remixed and re-released to radio. This version of the song is featured on Foiled for the Last Time. An acoustic version of the song appears as bonus track on the re-released version of History for Sale and also appears in solo acoustic form on Justin Furstenfeld's solo album Songs From An Open Book, and is also on the albums Stormaid: The Concert and Live From the Planet Archives Volume 1. A live version of Calling You appeared on Blue October's 2004 live CD/DVD Argue With a Tree.

== Music video ==
The original release of the music video documents the story of an astronaut (played by Justin Furstenfeld), singing of his girlfriend or wife back home on Earth. Later on, shots of the band performing on a screen back at mission control are interspersed with clips of the capsule returning to Earth. This video was directed by The Saline Project.

In 2007, a new video directed by Jeff Richter was released. This one depicts a blind man named Enrique (played by Erick Florez) who leaves his previous life as a gang banger to take care of his newborn daughter. While taking a walk with his daughter, Enrique prevents several people from accidents, like standing in front a passerby's way before an air conditioner falls to the ground, potentially killing him. Meanwhile, the band performs in a room full of lightbulbs and baby photos. The music video ends with Enrique dropping his keys and Justin picking the keys up for him.

== Other appearances ==
An acoustic version of "Calling You" appears at 10:04 of "Amazing" on the History for Sale album.

The song was also featured in the preview of the third Zoey 101 TV movie, Goodbye Zoey?

In the intro to the song "Hate Me" from the album Foiled, before the mother starts talking, women can be heard singing a portion of the chorus from this song, and two lines are spoken in the chorus of "X-Amount of Words". The women singing the song are Justin and Jeremy Furstenfeld's mother and her coworkers singing along to "Calling You" in a voicemail to Justin when they heard the song playing on the radio at their office.
