= I Hope You're Happy (Blue October album) =

2018 album by Blue October

Studio album by Blue October
- Released: August 17, 2018
- Genre: Rock
- Length: 56:42
- Label: Up/Down, Brando
- Producer: Justin Furstenfeld

Blue October chronology
Home (2016)	I Hope You're Happy (2018)	Live from Manchester (2019)

Blue October studio album chronology
Home (2016)	I Hope You're Happy (2018)	This Is What I Live For (2020)

Singles from I Hope You're Happy
- 1. "I Hope You're Happy" Released: January 12, 2018; 2. "Daylight" Released: 2018; 3. "How to Dance in Time" Released: February 1, 2019; 4. "King" Released: 2019

I Hope You're Happy is the ninth studio album by American band Blue October, released on August 17, 2018, on Up/Down and Brando Records.

The album peaked at number 28 on the Billboard 200.

== Development and promotion ==
The album was crowdsourced, like all of their albums from Any Man in America (2011) onwards. For this album, Blue October hosted its crowdsourcing campaign independently. The album was recorded during the winter of 2017–2018 at Justin Furstenfeld's Up/Down Studios. Although Furstenfeld had co-produced every Blue October album since 2006's Foiled, I Hope You're Happy marks the first Blue October album which Furstenfeld completely produced without any outside co-producers. The first single from the album, the title track, was released January 12, 2018.

The song "I Hope You're Happy" was the first to be recorded for the album, and was fully mixed and mastered by the end of 2017 in order to push it to radio in early 2018. The song was a radio hit for several months, reaching the top 20 on the Mediabase alternative rock chart. A video for the song was released February 22, 2018. The remainder of the album wrapped up recording in mid-January 2018, with overdubs and early mixing occurring on Justin Furstenfeld's tour bus for his one-man show to promote his Open Book Winter Album in January–February 2018. Final mixing by Tim Palmer and Eric Holtz occurred in March and April 2018, and the album was mastered in mid-April 2018. "Daylight" is described as edgy and full of energy, and "I Want to Come Back Home" is described as a pop-y song with a kicking beat for a song with sad lyrics.

== Critical reception ==
- James Christopher Monger of AllMusic found I Hope You're Happy to be "[s]teeped in optimism", providing "lush electronic flourishes, sumptuous string arrangements, feel-good choruses, and big, arena-sized hooks".
- Kyle Kohner of Riff Magazine described the album as "an earnest attempt at spreading positivity", remarking on the dramatic difference in both the lyrics and "glossy" new sound of I Hope You're Happy compared with their earlier work. Kohner also noted the album's "fun riffs", "catchy" choruses, and "clean and crisp" mixing, as well as the "blissful orchestral atmosphere" and prominent use of strings, synths, and drum machine. Although he found the lyrics to sometimes be simplistic, overall Kohner liked the album and felt that it had an "inspiring" backstory.
- Yvonne Glasgow of Side Stage Magazine gave the album five stars, commenting that "I Hope You're Happy" has a "creative edge that borders on gothic darkness and synth pop" and yet is consistent with "today’s pop and rock stylings". She also felt that although Blue October's sound had changed somewhat over time, even the album's more pop-oriented songs have some of the edge found in their older work, and that there is "still something deeper here, even in the love songs". She described the album's songs as "lyrically magnificent", and felt that readers should "expect to be inspired" when listening to the album.

== Track listing ==
Track listing adapted from AllMusic.

No.	Title	Writer(s)	Length
1.	"Daylight"	Justin Furstenfeld, Dwight Baker, Matt Noveskey	3:41
2.	"Your Love Is Like a Car Crash"	Justin Furstenfeld, Dwight Baker	5:20
3.	"I Want to Come Back Home"	Justin Furstenfeld, Dwight Baker, Ryan Delahoussaye, Zayra Alvarez	5:12
4.	"I'll Do Me, You Do You"	Justin Furstenfeld, Dwight Baker	3:44
5.	"I Hope You're Happy"	Justin Furstenfeld, Steve Schiltz	3:52
6.	"Colors Collide"	Justin Furstenfeld, Steve Schiltz	4:13
7.	"Remission in Cmaj"	Justin Furstenfeld	2:35
8.	"How to Dance in Time"	Justin Furstenfeld, Blue Miller	5:27
9.	"King"	Justin Furstenfeld, Ryan Delahoussaye, Eric Holtz	3:46
10.	"Let Forever Mean Forever"	Justin Furstenfeld, Matthew Ostrander	4:09
11.	"All That We Are"	Justin Furstenfeld, Matthew Ostrander, Steve Schiltz	5.35
12.	"Further Dive (The House That Dylan Built)"	Justin Furstenfeld, Matthew Ostrander	9:08
Total length:			56:42

== Personnel ==
- Justin Furstenfeld – vocals, guitar, producer
- Jeremy Furstenfeld – drums
- Matthew Ostrander – guitar
- Matt Noveskey – bass
- Ryan Delahoussaye – violin, keyboards
- Will Knaak - guitar (track 9)
- Collin Shook – keyboard
- Steve Schiltz – guitar
- Eric Holtz – engineering, mixing
- Tim Palmer – mixing
- Mark Needham – mixing (tracks 1, 5)
- Damien Lewis - mixing (tracks 4, 8, 10)
- Phil Tan – mixing (tracks 2, 3, 9, 11, 12)
- Chris Barber – album art, photography
- Tim Beck – album art
- Marshall Breedlove - assistant engineer
- Colin Leonard - mastering

== Charts ==
Chart (2018)	Peak position
US Billboard 200	28
US Digital Albums (Billboard)	7
US Independent Albums (Billboard)	2
US Top Album Sales (Billboard)	7
US Top Alternative Albums (Billboard)	3
US Top Rock Albums (Billboard)	4

== I Hope You're Happy ==
"I Hope You're Happy" was released as the album's lead single on January 12, 2018. The song peaked at number 13 on the US Billboard Hot Rock Songs chart, at number 15 on the Billboard Alternative Airplay chart, and at number 35 on the Billboard Adult Pop Songs chart. The official music video for the song was released on February 22, 2018, and had over 12 million views by June 2022. The actress in the video is Kelly Aishling Gray.

=== Weekly charts ===
Chart (2018)	Peak position
US Billboard Adult Top 40	35
US Billboard Alternative Songs	15
US Billboard Digital Song Sales	34
US Billboard Hot Rock Songs	13
US Billboard Rock Airplay	22
US Billboard Rock Digital Song Sales	7
