= Sway (Blue October album) =

Studio album by Blue October
- Released: August 20, 2013
- Recorded: February–April, 2013
- Genre: Alternative rock
- Length: 55:57
- Label: Up/Down

Blue October chronology
Any Man in America (2011)	Sway (2013)	Things We Do at Night (Live from Texas) (2015)

Blue October studio album chronology
Any Man in America (2011)	Sway (2013)	Home (2016)

Singles from Sway
- 1. "Bleed Out" Released: June 18, 2013; 2. "Angels in Everything" Released: December 6, 2013; 3. "Sway" Released: February 11, 2014; 4. "Fear" Released: September 22, 2014

Sway is the seventh studio album by Blue October. It was recorded at Fire Station Studio in San Marcos, Texas, with co-producer David Castell in February and March 2013. Additional recording sessions for strings and vocal overdubs took place at Test Tube Audio in Austin, Texas, in April 2013, and the album was mixed at Studio 62 in Austin by Tim Palmer between May and July 2013. Production credit for the album is shared between Justin Furstenfeld, David Castell and Tim Palmer. Castell had previously produced Blue October's album History For Sale and co-produced Foiled, while Palmer produced the band's album Any Man in America and mixed History for Sale. Sway was Blue October's first album to be released after Justin Furstenfeld got sober, and the songs have a marked sense of positivity and optimism compared to the band's previous work.

The band financed the production of the album through a PledgeMusic campaign which it began on April 2, 2013. The project reached its goal on April 5, 2013, and by August 14 had reached 263 percent of the goal and received 4,252 pledges. To raise money for the campaign, the band offered such items as music lessons, signed instruments, exclusive artwork, spots in a music video, and concert tickets for life. Five percent of the proceeds were donated to the MusicCares Foundation.

Like Blue October's previous album, Any Man in America, Sway was released on the band's independent label Up/Down Records. North American distribution is through Megaforce Records, one of Sony/RED's independent labels, with European distribution by Membran Records. Like the band's two previous albums, Sway was released on vinyl in addition to digital download and CD format. The original LP pressing in 2013 was on white vinyl, and quickly sold out, becoming a high priced collectors item among fans. The album was re-released on vinyl in 2025 in several variants: basic black, bleach marble, and a sea blue version that was limited to 100 copies. The band also made ten test pressings available for purchase.

The album was rated the second best album of 2013, in a tie with David Bowie's The Next Day, by the German music magazine Kulturnews. Sway also won the Reader's Choice award for Best Album in the Austin Music Blogger Awards.

== Album title and artwork ==
The album's cover art was created by Justin Furstenfeld and Brad Bond and depicts four white roses symbolizing the four members of the band who were principally involved in its recording. The fifth member, the guitarist C.B. Hudson, had left the band in 2010, returned after Julian Mandrake left the band, and joined the band to tour the album. According to Furstenfeld, Sway represented the band's current outlook on life, and he wanted to keep the artwork simple to represent a simplification of life. The word "Sway" is also symbolic of the four band members, as the word has four letters. Keeping with the simplification theme, the band wanted to give the album a short one-word title, and "Sway" also fit because listening to the music made them want to dance. At one point, the album was to be titled Hard Candy, but that was rejected after Furstenfeld's wife told him that Madonna and Counting Crows had already released albums with that title. "Debris" was also considered as a title, but was dismissed following the 2013 Moore tornado. Debris was used for the title of the acoustic EP which accompanied the album.

== Critical reception ==
Professional ratings
Review scores
Source	Rating
Allmusic	3/5 stars
Melodic	4/5 stars
Pop Bitez	5/5 stars
Ultimate Guitar	7.9/10
Playback: Stl	B−
InsiteAustin	(favorable)

Sway was met with positive reviews. Johan Wippsson of Melodic wrote, "It feels to me like the band really sat down and thought about what they stand for and what made them great. The band has really got back to their roots here and delivers an album in the same class as Foiled. It is quieter than before, but the atmosphere and the composition of the songs is brilliant like a beautiful autumn day." He gave the album a score of 4 out of 5. A critic writing for Popbitez said, "At a time when many of their contemporaries have either disbanded or resigned themselves to regurgitating past glories, Blue October have raised their bar and all but reinvented themselves." The album was rated 5 out of 5 after being described as "a personal best" for the band.

Allmusic gave the album a score of 3 out of 5 and said that the songs on the album result "in what...represents [Blue October's] most accessible, immediate, and growth-oriented collection of songs to date".

Playback: STL, InsiteAustin, Ultimate Guitar and Sputnik Music also gave the album favorable reviews.

== Commercial performance ==
In the US, the album debuted at No. 13 on the Billboard 200, No. 1 on the Billboard Alternative Albums chart, No. 2 on the Billboard Independent Albums chart and No. 3 on the Billboard Top Rock Albums chart, selling around 24,000 in its first week. The album has sold 77,000 copies in the US as of April 2016.

== Track listing ==
Furstenfeld wrote approximately sixty songs, which were narrowed down to fifteen that the band recorded, twelve of which appear on the album. A thirteenth song, "To Be", came out of the recording sessions and was included on the album. "To Be" is an instrumental track that was created by playing back a slowed down recording of the strings from the song "Fear". Songs that were not included on the album were "Snow Globe," "Keep On" and "Still Broken". One track, "Sorry Hearts", which was included on the accompanying EP, Debris, is an old 5591 song.

"Light You Up" was premiered at a concert on September 21, 2012. "Not Broken Anymore" was played as the final song each night on Furstenfeld's solo Open Book tour in April and May 2013. The song lengths were released by iTunes on July 16 but there were no new track releases other than "Bleed Out". On August 10, 2013, several radio stations streamed every song from the album on their websites, accompanied with commentary by Furstenfeld.

An EP of acoustic versions entitled Debris was available to fans who participated in the PledgeMusic campaign. It consists of five songs from the album and the bonus track "Sorry Hearts" mentioned above.

All lyrics are written by Justin Furstenfeld.

No.	Title	Music	Length
1.	"Breathe, It's Over"	Justin Furstenfeld, Matt Noveskey	1:14
2.	"Sway"	Justin Furstenfeld	4:47
3.	"Angels in Everything"	Justin Furstenfeld	4:25
4.	"Bleed Out"	Jeremy Raby, Christopher Lindsey, Mark L Holman, David Castell	3:52
5.	"Debris"	Justin Furstenfeld	6:41
6.	"Fear"	Justin Furstenfeld, Blue Miller	5:19
7.	"Things We Don't Know About"	Justin Furstenfeld, Matt Noveskey	4:22
8.	"Hard Candy"	Justin Furstenfeld, Julian Mandrake	4:18
9.	"Put It In"	Jeremy Furstenfeld, Matt Noveskey	4:21
10.	"Light You Up"	Justin Furstenfeld	4:21
11.	"Things We Do at Night"	Justin Furstenfeld	4:56
12.	"Not Broken Anymore"	Justin Furstenfeld, Christopher Lindsey, David Castell	4:29
13.	"To Be"	Justin Furstenfeld	3:15
Total length:			55:57

== Singles ==
The first single from the album, "Bleed Out", appeared on radio on June 6, 2013, and became available for sale through digital outlets on June 25. A music video for the single was filmed in Dallas, Texas, on June 15 by the director Norry Niven. "Bleed Out" was a top 25 single on the Billboard Alternative Airplay chart. "Angels in Everything" was released as a single in Germany, and reached number 25 on the radio chart. The album's title track, "Sway", was released to radio as the third single on February 11, 2014, and a video, directed by Bongani Mlambo, was released on April 23, 2014.

== Personnel ==
- David Castell – producer, mixing, engineering
- Justin Furstenfeld – vocals, guitar, programming, sleeve art, producer
- Matt Noveskey – guitar (1, 4, 7, 8, 9), bass guitar, vocals
- Jeremy Furstenfeld – drums, percussion, vocals
- Ryan Delahoussaye – violin, keyboard, synthesizer, mandolin, vocals, string arrangements
- C.B. Hudson – guitar (4)
- Kevin Butler – engineering, mixing, guitar (3, 4, 8, 9, 11)
- Steve Schlitz of Longwave – guitar (3, 4, 7, 10, 12)
- Ashleigh Stone – vocals (11), piano (6)
- Steve Bernal – cello
- Brad Bond – sleeve art
- Tim Palmer – mixing, production, guitar (3, 4, 5, 6, 7, 9, 11), vocals
- Eric Holtz – assistant engineer
- Laura Villalobos – assistant engineer
- Brandon Smith – digital editing and programming
- Zayra Alvarez – photography

== Charts ==
Chart (2013)	Peak position
US Billboard 200	13
US Top Alternative Albums (Billboard)	1
US Digital Albums (Billboard)	10
US Independent Albums (Billboard)	2
US Top Rock Albums (Billboard)	3
US Indie Store Album Sales (Billboard)	21
