= Live in Manchester =

Live in Manchester may refer to:

- Live From Manchester, a 2019 album by Blue October
- Live in Manchester (The Mutton Birds album), 1999
- Live in Manchester (Slash album), 2010
- Live in Manchester (Lisa Stansfield album), 2015
