= I Hope You're Happy =

I Hope You're Happy may refer to:

- I Hope You're Happy (Blue October album) or the title song, 2018
- I Hope You're Happy (BigXthaPlug album) or the title song, 2025
