= Harvard of the South (band) =

American rock band

- Origin: Brooklyn, New York, and San Marcos, Texas, U.S.
- Genres: Alternative rock
- Years active: 2014–present
- Labels: Slō Lab Records, Hand Drawn Records
- Spinoff of: Blue October; Longwave
- Members: Justin Furstenfeld; Steve Schiltz; Jeremy Furstenfeld; Matt Noveskey

Harvard of the South (often stylized HARVARD of the SOUTH) is a four-piece rock supergroup that released its first recordings and played its initial live shows in 2014 but has its beginnings in collaborations between Longwave/Blue October singer/guitarist Steve Schiltz and Blue October members Justin Furstenfeld, Jeremy Furstenfeld, and Matt Noveskey, dating back to 2011. Harvard of the South released their debut EP, Miracle, in October 2014. Their song "Without" was issued as a free download via SoundCloud on May 8, 2017. The band's full-length studio album was published on December 11, 2020.

== History ==
Blue October members Jeremy and Justin Furstenfeld became fans of the band Longwave upon seeing them perform in Austin, Texas, during SXSW on the tour for their 2003 album, The Strangest Things. In interviews at the time, they touted Longwave as being their favorite band.

Blue October's manager reached out to Longwave with the idea of the two bands touring together. The plan came to fruition in 2009, with Longwave opening Blue October's Approaching Normal summer tour, which also coincided with the release of Longwave's album Secrets Are Sinister. At the Boston date of this tour, Justin Furstenfeld joined Longwave on stage to sing the song "I Know It's Coming Someday".

Between 2012 and 2013, Steve and Jeremy composed eleven songs and recorded them at Jeremy's house, with the majority of their work occurring in 2012 while Justin was in rehab. Blue October's bassist, Matt Noveskey, was brought in to round out the group, and recording was completed in early 2014. Harvard of the South played their first concerts opening for Blue October in San Marcos, Texas, March 21–22, 2014. The San Marcos concerts also featured Steve playing guitar with Blue October on their song "Bleed Out". In October, the first five songs were released as a limited-edition EP, sold at concerts.

The band released their self-titled debut album in 2020.

In 2023, after twelve years of collaborating, Steve became an official member of Blue October.

== Band members ==
- Steve Schiltz – vocals, guitar
- Justin Furstenfeld – vocals, guitar
- Jeremy Furstenfeld – drums
- Matt Noveskey – bass

== Discography ==
- Miracle (EP, 2014)
- Harvard of the South (2020)
