= Songs from an Open Book =

Studio album by Justin Furstenfeld
- Released: September 2, 2014
- Recorded: Summer 2014
- Genre: Acoustic rock
- Label: Brando/Up-Down Records
- Producer: Justin Furstenfeld

Justin Furstenfeld chronology
Songs from an Open Book (2014)	Open Book Winter Album (2017)

Songs from an Open Book is the debut solo acoustic album by Blue October frontman Justin Furstenfeld. It features songs as they were originally written, with only a Guild acoustic guitar and a single vocal track. The album was recorded at Crazy Making Studio in San Marcos, Texas, which is Justin's home studio (the spoken word tracks were recorded at live shows). Furstenfeld promoted the album with a nationwide U.S. tour, as well as dates in Germany and England.

All of the songs have appeared on previous releases by Blue October and The Last Wish.

The album was released September 2, 2014, and debuted at number sixteen on the iTunes Top albums Chart and at number two on the iTunes Rock albums chart, and reached number one on the Amazon.com rock chart.

== Track listing ==
1. "The Answer" – 6:10
2. "Can and Cannot Say" – 3:31
3. "Black Orchid" – 4:31
4. "A Funny Thing" – 1:11
5. "Angel" – 5:30
6. "Consent to Treatment Story" – 1:01
7. "Schizophrenia" – 4:27
8. "The Birthday Present" – 0:19
9. "Calling You" – 3:42
10. "Chameleon Boy" – 5:12
11. "The Apology" – 0:09
12. "Hate Me" – 4:45
13. "Sound of Pulling Heaven Down" – 4:10
14. "Any Man in America" – 4:55
15. "The Worry List" – 4:54
16. "The Sarah Story" – 1:37
17. "Fear" – 5:35
18. "Up There" – 1:25
19. "Not Broken Anymore" – 5:09

== Credits ==
- Justin Furstenfeld – vocals, guitar, producer
- Eric Holtz – engineer, mixing
- Terra Nova – mastering
