= Into the Ocean =

Single by Blue October

from the album Foiled
- Released: 2006
- Recorded: 2005
- Genre: Alternative rock; art rock; synth-pop
- Length: 4:02
- Label: Universal Records
- Songwriter: Justin Furstenfeld
- Producers: David Castell; Justin Furstenfeld

Blue October singles chronology
"Hate Me" (2006)	"Into the Ocean" (2006)	"She's My Ride Home" (2007)

Music video
- "Into The Ocean" on YouTube

"Into the Ocean" is the second single from Blue October's fifth album, Foiled. The song peaked at #53 on the Billboard Hot 100, while the music video for the song, directed by Zach Merck, reached number one on the VH1 V-Spot countdown. On May 4, 2012 the single was certified platinum for sales of one million in the United States. It was featured on the TV series The Sopranos and Moonlight.

The song was initially released on the 2006 album Foiled, and subsequent versions of the song have been released on the EP Foiled Again, the acoustic album Ugly Side: An Acoustic Evening with Blue October, the live album Teach Your Baby Well Live, the live album/concert film Things We Do At Night - Live From Texas, and the live solo album Open Book Winter Album. A cover version was released on the Hurricane Bells 2010 EP Down Comes The Rain.

== Content ==
The song contrasts an upbeat rhythm and light melodies with Ryan Delahoussaye's erhu and lamenting lyrics typical of "Hate Me" and other songs written by lead singer Justin Furstenfeld. The feelings conveyed by the song reflect Furstenfeld's real-life battle with depression and suicide attempts.

The lyrics convey the first-person account of a "normal boy" who has fallen or jumped off the bow of a ship and the thoughts that pass through the boy's mind as he loses the will to keep afloat by treading water. His final thought is of his beloved as he eventually concedes to drowning: "I thought of just your face, relaxed and floated into space."

In the final verse the song takes on a deeper meaning as the lyrics reveal that the initial story of the boy drowning was just a dream spurred by feelings of grief over the loss of a loved one, presumably the woman whose face gave him comfort as he imagined he was drowning. The dream is referred to lyrically as "Midnight's late reminder of the loss of her, the one I love." The song then indicates that he wishes, like in the dream, that he could slip "into the ocean, end it all."

According to a VH1-online article about the band, "Into the Ocean" has affected many listeners who may have been contemplating suicide. Furstenfeld is quoted as saying, "If I have saved others, I don't know what to say. But if I can do that for them, why the fuck can't I do that for myself?"

== Charts ==
=== Weekly charts ===
Chart (2006–07)	Peak position
Canada Hot 100 (Billboard)	19
Canada Hot AC (Billboard)	3
US Billboard Hot 100	53
US Adult Alternative Airplay (Billboard)	21
US Adult Pop Airplay (Billboard)	10
US Alternative Airplay (Billboard)	20
US Pop Airplay (Billboard)	39

=== Year-end charts ===
Chart (2007)	Position
US Adult Top 40 (Billboard)	28

== Certifications ==
Region	Certification	Certified units/sales
United States (RIAA)	Platinum	1,000,000^{^}
^{^} Shipments figures based on certification alone.

== Release history ==
Release dates and formats for "Into the Ocean"
Region	Date	Format	Label(s)	Ref.
United States	November 6, 2006	Mainstream airplay	Universal Motown	
