= Zayra Álvarez =

Puerto Rican musician

- Born: Zayra Enid Álvarez Dones; Guayama, Puerto Rico
- Other name: Nena Catalina
- Education: University of Puerto Rico at Mayagüez (B.A.)
- Occupation: Singer-songwriter
- Website: zayraalvarez.com

Zayra Enid Álvarez Dones is a Puerto Rican singer and musician, currently based in Texas. Zayra has recorded in the genres of rock en español, Latin pop and EDM.

== Music career ==
Raised in Arroyo, Puerto Rico she attended the University of Puerto Rico, majoring in Industrial Engineering. Subsequently, she moved to Texas, where she became active in the local club scene, and signed a record deal with Brando Records. She recorded her debut album, Ruleta, in Spanish. A few months later, Kevin Lawrie at Sony Norte heard the tracks and signed her to the Miami-based label. Álvarez continued to work in the Latin music scene, getting airplay for her debut single "Hoy" on stations throughout Puerto Rico and the US. Picky Talarico directed the video for "Hoy", which was shot on location in Buenos Aires, Argentina. After a program director for Entravision Communications happened upon her performing at the Grove in Los Angeles, "Hoy" enjoyed further airplay, which led Sony Norte to release a second single, "Cada Momento".

While touring and performing in Texas, Álvarez became close friends with her Brando Records label mates Blue October, who invited her to sing on two songs: "Come in Closer" off of their album History for Sale and "Into the Ocean" from their platinum-selling album Foiled.

Álvarez landed a spot on the CBS TV show Rockstar: Supernova in 2006. Her performances met with mixed reviews. Los Angeles Times pop music critic Ann Powers stated that "Rockstar's most intriguing contestant, the Puerto Rican punk chanteuse Zayra Alvarez", while her hometown paper, the Dallas Observer, referred to her as having a "serious, possibly fatal, pitch deficiency". Marc Hirsh declared that "Zayra quickly learned to own her weirdness and start driving it without fear... without changing her style or even necessarily improving, she revealed herself to be what allmusic.com's postseason roundtable referred to as 'the most exciting, original, and audacious' singer in the entire competition." TMZ referred to her as the "breakout star" of the show. During her tenure, she covered many well-known songs, including "Call Me", "867-5309/Jenny", and "Everybody Hurts". On week 7, Álvarez performed her original song, "Lluvia de Mar". She was eliminated from the show on August 16.

After the show, Álvarez dropped her last name and became known simply as Zayra. Her third album, Baby Likes To Bang, was released on September 14, 2010, by Brando Records. The album was a stylistic shift, more influenced by dance music. The album spawned two singles, "V.I.P." and "Baby Likes To Bang." "V.I.P." was a Top 5 Billboard Dance Club Hit, and "Baby Likes To Bang", released subsequently, was declared a #1 Dance Breakout by Billboard'.

Her songs have been covered by singer Marcela Mendez. Michael Butler of The Rock and Roll Geek Show is a big fan of Zayra and supported her career.

In 2019, Zayra launched a concept album, under the name Nena Catalina." This album "50/50" was released on April 29, 2022. She released a new single, "Memorias y Silencio under her original name on October 11, 2023 from an as-yet to be named album. On May 16, 2025 Zayra will release new material, the single Soltera y Con Dinero.

== Other ventures ==
Zayra acted in the independent film "Lycanthrope." The movie features one of her original songs, "This Is Love", which can be found on the re-release of her album "Ruleta".She has worked as a photographer for Blue October and co-directed a music video for Tori Velasquez with Merritt Fields. In 2014, Zayra started a line of prints she illustrated named The Sleepy Heads Collection by Pepper Love. She has also designed jewelry for the line Z+V for Vinca in addition to working as an interior designer.

== Discography ==
=== Studio albums ===
- Breaking Up Gray Skies (2002)
- Baby Likes to Bang (2010)

=== Appearances in other albums ===
- Blue October - History for Sale, guest vocals on "Come in Closer"
- Blue October - Argue With a Tree, guest vocals on "Come in Closer"
- Blue October - Foiled, backing vocals on "Into the Ocean"
- Stormaid: The Concert
