= Baby Likes to Bang =

Baby Likes To Bang

Studio album by Zayra Alvarez
- Released: September 14, 2010

Zayra Alvarez chronology
Breaking Up Gray Skies (2002)	Baby Likes To Bang (2010)

Baby Likes to Bang is the second studio album by singer Zayra released on September 14, 2010 by Brando Records. This album represents Zayra's transition into dance music, featuring remixes by top DJs from around the world. Two singles have been released from the album, "V.I.P." and "Baby Likes to Bang."

"V.I.P.", the first single from the album and a Top 5 Billboard Dance Club Hit, was remixed by Dave Audé, Mike Rizzo, DJ Paulo & Alain Jackinsky, Steph Seroussi, and Adrian Benavides. After the release of the single, the blogger Arjan wrote "every summer needs a dance queen and Zayra is turning out to be this season's club royalty."

The second single "Baby Likes To Bang" was released November 8, 2010. It was declared the #1 Dance Breakout by Billboard and was the #3 most added song by DJs behind Katy Perry and Rihanna. The single features remixes from DJ Escape & Tony Coluccio, Razor N Guido, Mixin Marc & Tony Svejda and Steph Seroussi & Nam.

== Track listing ==
1. Baby Likes To Bang
2. V.I.P.
3. Sexy Super Mini Skirt
4. Feel Good
5. Liquid D
6. Violent Man
7. V.I.P. (Dave Audé Club Mix)
8. Sexy Super Mini Skirt (Adrian Benavides Club Mix)
9. V.I.P. (Mike Rizzo Funk Generation Club Mix)
10. V.I.P. (DJ Paulo & Alain Jackinsky Dub Mix)
11. V.I.P. (Adrian Benavides Red Carpet Club Mix)
12. V.I.P. (Steph Seroussi and Nam Club Mix)
