= Jeff Richter =

American music video director and editor

Jeff Richter is an American music video director and editor. He has worked for Intuitive Entertainment, MTV Networks, Trans-Siberian Orchestra and is the owner of Earthquake Productions, a production company where he directs and edits his own music videos, concert films and commercials.

== Select videography ==
1989

- "Bed of Nails" (directed by Nigel Dick; editor only) - Alice Cooper

1990

- "The More Things Change" - Cinderella

1992

- "Foreclosure of a Dream" - Megadeth

1994

- "Foreign Sand" - Roger Taylor featuring Yoshiki

1996

- "Work It Out" (directed by Nigel Dick; editor only) - Def Leppard

1997

- "Break on Through (To the Other Side)" (version 2) - The Doors

1998

- "Ain't Goin' to Goa" ('98 Radio Remix) - Alabama 3

1999

- "Nobody Can Stop Me" (directed by Gregory Dark; editor only) - Bizzy Bone
- "Blue Monday" (directed by Gregory Dark; editor only) - Orgy
- "Fuck Dying" (directed by Gregory Dark; editor only) - Ice Cube featuring Korn
- "Thug Mentality" (directed by Gregory Dark; editor only) - Krayzie Bone
- "Awful" - Hole
- "Good to Be Alive" (Radio Remix) - DJ Rap
- "Welcome to the Jungle" (Live) - Guns N' Roses
- "The Anthem" - Sway & King Tech featuring RZA, Tech N9ne, Eminem, Xzibit, Pharoahe Monch, Kool G Rap, Jayo Felony, Chino XL and KRS-One

2000

- "Whoa!" - Black Rob
- "Into the Void" (co-directed with Walter Stern; also editor) - Nine Inch Nails
- "You Sang to Me" (also editor) - Marc Anthony
- "Quality Control" - Jurassic 5
- "Wifey" - Next
- "The Light" - Pharoahe Monch
- "Oooh." - De La Soul featuring Redman
- "Oh No" - Mos Def, Pharoahe Monch and Nate Dogg
- "After Party" - Koffee Brown

2001

- "W.O.E. Is Me (World of Entertainment)" (uncredited) - Jurassic 5
- "It Don't Matter" - Rehab
- "La Rhumba" - RZA as Bobby Digital featuring Method Man, Killa Sin and Beretta 9

2002

- "The Knoc" - Knoc-turn'al featuring Missy Elliott and Dr. Dre

2003

- "Send the Pain Below" - Chevelle
- "Worms of the Earth" - Finch
- "We Want Peace" - Lenny Kravitz
- "True to Myself" - Ziggy Marley

2004

- "She Bangs" - William Hung
- "Saturday Night" - Ozomatli

2005

- "Comin' to Your City" - Big & Rich
- "Where Da At" - B.G. featuring Homebwoi

2007

- "Rise Today" (directed by Dale Resteghini; editor only) - Alter Bridge
- "Calling You" (also editor) - Blue October

2014

- "Lose Yourself Avicii and Leehom Wang" (directed by Jeff Richter; director editor) - Avicii
