= Hate Me =

Hate Me may refer to:

- "Hate Me" (Blue October song), 2006
- "Hate Me" (Ellie Goulding and Juice Wrld song), 2019
- "Hate Me" (Lil Yachty and Ian song), 2024
- "Hate Me" (Miley Cyrus song), from the 2020 album Plastic Hearts
- "Hate Me!", a song by Children of Bodom, 2000
- "Hate Me", a song by Attila from Guilty Pleasure
- "Hate Me", a song by Lil Peep from Come Over When You're Sober, Pt. 2
- "Hate Me", a song by Pain from Nothing Remains the Same
- "Hate Me", a song by Pink from Trustfall
- "Hate Me", a song by The Word Alive from Hard Reset
- "Hate Me (Sometimes)", a song by Stand Atlantic from Pink Elephant
- Hate Me (album) or the title song, by Escape the Fate, 2015
- Hate Me (EP), a 2018 EP by Morgenshtern

== See also ==
- Hate (disambiguation)
