= Hate Me (Blue October song) =

Single by Blue October

from the album Foiled
- Released: January 24, 2006
- Genre: Alternative rock
- Length: 6:20 (album/intro version) 4:15 (no intro/radio edit version)
- Label: Universal
- Songwriter: Justin Furstenfeld
- Producers: David Castell; Justin Furstenfeld

Blue October singles chronology
"Calling You" (2003)	"Hate Me" (2006)	"Into the Ocean" (2006)

Music video
- "Hate Me" on YouTube

"Hate Me" is a song by American alternative rock group Blue October. It is the band's most commercially successful single, peaking at number two on Billboard's Alternative Songs chart and number 31 on the U.S. Billboard Hot 100. In 2007, the video for the song was nominated for a MuchMusic Video Award for best international video. The song won an ASCAP award in 2007. On July 13, 2012, the song was certified platinum for sales of one million in the United States.

The song was initially released on the 2006 album Foiled, and several versions have been released since. A studio acoustic version was released to fans who pre-ordered Foiled. A live acoustic version was also released on the EP Foiled Again. A live acoustic version, which was recorded on the band's radio promotional tour prior to Foiled's release, was released on 97X Green Room 2, a 2006 radio station compilation album. Other live versions of the song appear on the iTunes exclusive EP Live at Lollapalooza 2006, as well as the live albums Teach Your Baby Well Live, Live From Manchester and the live album/concert film Things We Do At Night - Live From Texas. A solo acoustic version was released on lead singer Justin Furstenfeld's 2014 album Songs from an Open Book.

The song was initially not successful on radio until a staff member named Kate at WSUN (FM) in Tampa, Florida found the CD in the trash and decided to give it a listen. She convinced her program director to put the song into rotation and the song quickly spread in popularity nationwide.

== Content ==
Furstenfeld wrote "Hate Me" as a response to the way his drug addiction and depression damaged his relationship with his girlfriend Maime, for whom he wrote the song "Calling You". An authentic voicemail Furstenfeld received from his mother in which she expresses concern for whether he is doing well and taking his medication is featured at the beginning of the song.

== Video ==
The music video for "Hate Me", directed by Kevin Kerslake, begins with Furstenfeld sitting on his bed holding an answering machine and playing the tape of his mother which can be heard at the beginning of the song. After the message stops playing, Furstenfeld begins to walk through the house, seeing memories of him and his mother - her talking to him as a young boy, taking Prom pictures, and finally attempting to wake him from an overdose - replay in different rooms.

These scenes alternate with footage of Blue October singing the song in the house's attic during the chorus. At the end of the video, Furstenfeld takes the answering machine to a cemetery and lays it on his mother's grave. The video led many fans to believe that Jeremy and Justin's mother had died. She is in fact alive, and she plays herself in the video. The fictional narrative about her dying was conceived by the music video director.

== Charts ==
=== Weekly charts ===
Weekly chart performance for "Hate Me"
Chart (2006)	Peak position
Canada Hot AC (Billboard)	4
Canada CHR/Top 40 (Billboard)	10
Canada Rock (Billboard)	4
US Billboard Hot 100	31
US Adult Pop Airplay (Billboard)	13
US Alternative Airplay (Billboard)	2
US Mainstream Rock (Billboard)	21
US Pop Airplay (Billboard)	17
US Pop 100 (Billboard)	24

=== Year-end charts ===
Year-end chart performance for "Hate Me"
Chart (2006)	Position
US Billboard Hot 100	82
US Adult Top 40 (Billboard)	37
US Alternative Songs (Billboard)	6

== Certifications ==
Certifications for "Hate Me"
Region	Certification	Certified units/sales
United States (RIAA)	Platinum	1,000,000^{^}
^{^} Shipments figures based on certification alone.

== Release history ==
Release dates and formats for "Hate Me"
Region	Date	Format	Label(s)	Ref.
United States	April 17, 2006	Mainstream airplay	Universal	
