= This Is What I Live For =

Studio album by Blue October
- Released: October 23, 2020
- Studio: Up/Down Studio
- Genre: Alternative rock
- Length: 57:56
- Labels: Up/Down, Brando
- Producer: Justin Furstenfeld

Blue October chronology
Live From Manchester (2019)	This Is What I Live For (2020)	Spinning the Truth Around (2022)

Blue October studio album chronology
I Hope You're Happy (2018)	This Is What I Live For (2020)	Spinning the Truth Around (2022)

Singles from This Is What I Live For
- 1. "Oh My My" Released: February 28, 2020; 2. "Completely" Released: August 21, 2020; 3. "Moving On (So Long)" Released: September 25, 2020

This Is What I Live For is the tenth studio album by Blue October, released via Up/Down-Brando Records on October 23, 2020 after originally being scheduled for September 18, 2020. The artwork for the album was created by Phillip Nichols. This Is What I Live For is the first Blue October studio album to feature lead guitarist Will Knaak on every song. The album also marks the first appearance of Justin Furstenfeld's daughter Blue Reed on one of the band's recordings, providing vocals on the song "Fight for Love". The title track features vocals and lyrics by Steve Schiltz of Longwave, a longtime collaborator and de facto session member of Blue October. The songs “I Will Follow You” and “This is What I Live For” were recorded at Peter Gabriel's Real World Studios. The song "Only Lost is Found" samples the Idaho song "Live Today Again" from the 2005 album The Lone Gunman.

== Promotion ==
The first single, "Oh My My", reached the top 10 on the alternative rock radio chart in September 2020. The group also released a music video for "Oh My My". However, because of the COVID-19 pandemic, the band members did not appear in the video; instead it was created by animator Johnny Chew.

== Track listing ==
This Is What I Live For track listing
No.	Title	Lyrics	Music	Length
1.	"I Laugh at Myself"	Justin Furstenfeld	Justin Furstenfeld	3:24
2.	"The Way I Used to Love You"	Justin Furstenfeld	Justin Furstenfeld, Eric Holtz	4:04
3.	"Love Stupid" (featuring Karen Hover)	Justin Furstenfeld	Justin Furstenfeld, Steve Schiltz	4:31
4.	"This Is What I Live For" (featuring Steve Schiltz)	Justin Furstenfeld, Steve Schiltz	Justin Furstenfeld, Eric Holtz, Steve Schiltz	4:47
5.	"Fight for Love" (featuring Blue Reed)	Justin Furstenfeld	Justin Furstenfeld, Steve Schiltz, Matt Noveskey, Eric Holtz	4:06
6.	"Oh My My"	Justin Furstenfeld	Justin Furstenfeld, Eric Holtz	3:10
7.	"Moving On (So Long)"	Justin Furstenfeld	Justin Furstenfeld	3:07
8.	"I Will Follow You"	Justin Furstenfeld	Justin Furstenfeld	4:01
9.	"Completely"	Justin Furstenfeld	Eric Holtz	3:55
10.	"Stay with Me"	Justin Furstenfeld	Justin Furstenfeld, Ryan Delahoussaye, Jeremy Furstenfeld, Matt Noveskey, Will Knaak	6:16
11.	"The Weatherman"	Justin Furstenfeld, Matt Noveskey	Justin Furstenfeld, Matt Noveskey, Casey McPherson	5:30
12.	"Who Do You Run From"	Justin Furstenfeld	Justin Furstenfeld	5:57
13.	"Only Lost Is Found"	Justin Furstenfeld	Justin Furstenfeld, Eric Holtz	5:08
Total length:				57:56

== Personnel ==
- Justin Furstenfeld – lead vocals, guitar, producer
- Jeremy Furstenfeld – drums
- Matt Noveskey – bass guitar
- Will Knaak – guitar
- Ryan Delahoussaye – keyboard, violin
- Eric Holtz – engineer
- Jayson Peters – assistant audio engineer
- Kaleb Munoz – assistant audio engineer
- Steve Schiltz – vocals, guitar
- Karen Hover – vocals
- Blue Reed Furstenfeld – vocals
- Charley Siess – drum tech
- Phillip Nichols – sleeve art

== Charts ==
Chart performance for This Is What I Live For
Chart (2020)	Peak position
US Billboard 200	102
US Top Rock Albums (Billboard)	19
