= Open Book Winter Album =

Live album by Justin Furstenfeld
- Released: November 24, 2017
- Recorded: January–February 2017
- Genre: Acoustic rock
- Label: Brando/Up-Down Records
- Producer: Justin Furstenfeld

Justin Furstenfeld chronology
Songs from an Open Book (2014)	Open Book Winter Album (2017)

Open Book Winter Album is the second solo acoustic album by Blue October frontman, Justin Furstenfeld. The album was recorded live during Furstenfeld's one-man Open Book tour in January–February 2017 and was released November 24, 2017, on compact disc, vinyl, and digital download formats.

The songs on the album represent a mix of old unreleased 5591 (Furstenfeld's solo stage name) songs ("Define the Trail", "Gun Metal Blue", "Morning Everything"), 5591 songs that have been released in some form by Blue October ("Graceful Dancing", "Sorry Hearts"), songs that have seen official release on Blue October albums (tracks 7–19), and a new, previously unreleased song ("Pink").

== Track listing ==
1. "Define the Trail"
2. "Gun Metal Blue"
3. "Morning Everything"
4. "Pink"
5. "Graceful Dancing"
6. "Sorry Hearts"
7. "For My Brother"
8. "Two A.M. Lovesick"
9. "Breakfast After Ten"
10. "Italian Radio"
11. "Amnesia"
12. "Conversation Via Radio (Do You Ever Wonder) "
13. "Drop"
14. "Ugly Side"
15. "Into the Ocean"
16. "We Know Where You Go"
17. "Home"
18. "I Want It"
19. "Blue Does"

== Credits ==
- Justin Furstenfeld – vocals, guitar
- Eric Holtz – engineer, mixing
