= Home (Blue October album) =

Studio album by Blue October
- Released: April 22, 2016
- Recorded: August – November 2015
- Genre: Alternative rock
- Length: 56:13
- Label: Up/Down
- Producers: Tim Palmer, Justin Furstenfeld

Blue October chronology
Things We Do at Night (Live from Texas) (2015)	Home (2016)	I Hope You're Happy (2018)

Blue October studio album chronology
Sway (2013)	Home (2016)	I Hope You're Happy (2018)

Singles from Home
- 1. "Home" Released: December 16, 2015; 2. "Break Ground" Released: May 31, 2016; 3. "The Still" Released: September 29, 2016; 4. "I Want It" Released: February 2017

Professional ratings
Review scores
Source	Rating
Jam Magazine	(favorable)
teamrock.com	(favorable)

Home is the eighth studio album by Blue October. The album was recorded between August and November 2015 at Orb Studios in Austin, Texas and Justin Furstenfeld's home studio Crazy Making Studio. Long-time collaborator, Tim Palmer, co-produced and mixed the album.

After its first week of sales, Home charted at number 10 on the Building Album Sales chart with sales of 22,194 units. On the Billboard charts, Home debuted at number 1 on the Rock Albums Chart, number 1 on the Alternative Albums Chart, number 1 on the Independent Albums Chart, and number 19 on the Billboard 200. The first single, the title track "Home" made its radio debut December 16, 2015, and spent over six months on the Adult Top 40, peaking at number 24. The followup single "I Want It" also charted, peaking at number 36.

Justin Furstenfeld wrote the album on a tiny keyboard while driving through the California desert.

The cover image is a painting representing Jeremy and Justin Furstenfeld's parents' first kiss.

== Track listing ==
No.	Title	Writer(s)	Length
1.	"Coal Makes Diamonds"	Justin Furstenfeld, Matt Noveskey, Steve Schiltz	5:04
2.	"Driver"	Justin Furstenfeld, Jeremy Furstenfeld	4:42
3.	"Heart Go Bang"	Justin Furstenfeld	4:34
4.	"I Want It"	Justin Furstenfeld	4:37
5.	"Home"	Justin Furstenfeld	4:07
6.	"We Know Where You Go"	Justin Furstenfeld	4:24
7.	"The Lucky One"	Justin Furstenfeld, Matt Noveskey	5:40
8.	"Break Ground"	Justin Furstenfeld	3:53
9.	"Leave It in the Dressing Room (Shake It Up)"	Justin Furstenfeld, Matt Noveskey, Steve Schiltz, Tim Palmer,	4:05
10.	"Houston Heights"	Justin Furstenfeld, Matt Noveskey	3:17
11.	"Time Changes Everything"	Justin Furstenfeld, Ryan Delahoussaye	7:54
12.	"The Still"	Justin Furstenfeld	3:54

Bonus tracks
No.	Title	Writer(s)	Length
13.	"Heart Go Bang (The Egg Night Mix)"	Justin Furstenfeld	4:49
14.	"Home (Tim Palmer Mix)"	Justin Furstenfeld	4:05

== Personnel ==
- Justin Furstenfeld – vocals, guitar, producer, programming
- Matt Noveskey – bass
- Jeremy Furstenfeld – drums, percussion
- Ryan Delahoussaye – violin, keyboard
- C.B. Hudson – guitar
- Tim Palmer – producer, and mixing
- Mark Needham – co-producer, mixing
- Eric Holtz – engineer, programming
- Steve Schiltz of Longwave – guitar on tracks 1, 2, 3, 4, 6, and 9
- Matt Chamberlain – drums on track 5
- Robert Sewell – assistant engineer
- Brad Bond – package design

== Charts ==
Chart (2016)	Peak position
US Billboard 200	19
