= Foiled =

Studio album by Blue October
- Released: April 4, 2006
- Recorded: Early 2005
- Genre: Alternative rock
- Length: 57:57
- Label: Universal
- Producers: David Castell; Justin Furstenfeld; Patrick Leonard

Blue October chronology
Argue with a Tree... (2004)	Foiled (2006)	Foiled for the Last Time (2007)

Blue October studio album chronology
History for Sale (2003)	Foiled (2006)	Approaching Normal (2009)

Singles from Foiled
- 1. "Hate Me" Released: January 24, 2006; 2. "Into the Ocean" Released: October 16, 2006; 3. "She's My Ride Home" Released: May 22, 2007; 4. "X Amount of Words" Released: 2007

Professional ratings
Review scores
Source	Rating
AllMusic	3.5/5 stars
Billboard	(favorable)
IGN	5.9/10
Sputnikmusic	3.5/5 stars
The Tune	4.7/5

Foiled is the fourth studio album by American rock band Blue October, released on April 4, 2006, by Universal Records. The album debuted at number 29 on the US Billboard 200, marking the band's first entry on the chart. The album was certified gold in the United States on August 9, 2006, and on February 22, 2007, was certified platinum. The album was also a success in Canada, where it has also achieved platinum status. It was supported by four singles: "Hate Me", "Into the Ocean", "She's My Ride Home" and "X Amount of Words".

== Background ==
The album was recorded during the summer of 2005. Most of the songs on the album are older Blue October and 5591 songs, except for "Into the Ocean" and "Hate Me", which were written in early 2005 while Justin Furstenfeld was living in Los Angeles and recording the early demos for the album. Foiled was originally going to be titled Beyond the Sadness and was to be released October 11, 2005. During the fall of 2005, the working title was changed to Living Just to Watch It All Go By, which is a lyric from the song "It's Just Me". The eventual album title Foiled was coined by Justin Furstenfeld and Jeremy Furstenfeld's father, Dan Furstenfeld, as a tongue-in-cheek reference to the album's numerous delays. Two promotional spin-offs, Foiled Again and Foiled for the Last Time, were released in 2007. Foiled was listed at number 150 among Billboard's top 200 albums of 2007.

== Singles ==
"Hate Me" was the first single from the album. A video for the song appeared on VH1, and the song peaked at number two on the Modern Rock charts.

The second single, "Into the Ocean", was also successful on radio, and the video peaked at number one on VH1.

The track "Congratulations" features guest vocals by Imogen Heap. The track "Into the Ocean" features guest vocals from Zayra Alvarez (best known for her appearance on Rock Star: Supernova). Other guest singers appear on the song "Overweight", but are not named in the album credits.

"Drilled a Wire Through My Cheek" was also included on the Saw III soundtrack and features guest vocals by Kirk Baxley. It is the "heaviest" track on the album because of its masochistic themed lyrics.

== Release and promotion ==
The version of the album released in Europe contains the bonus tracks "Independently Happy" and "Chameleon Boy", from Consent to Treatment and History for Sale, respectively, but does not contain the hidden track "It's Just Me". Later versions of the album feature a re-recorded version of the song "Calling You" as the final track. Foiled was Blue October's final album to be released on cassette. In 2026, a red and blue marble vinyl version of Foiled was released as part of the Collected Series 2006–2011 box set along with the albums Approaching Normal, Any Man in America and Teach Your Baby Well. The Foiled album was also released on vinyl as a stand-alone double LP in four different variants: standard black, silver marble, galaxy blue, and smokey translucent deluxe edition which also includes three bonus tracks.

A premium version of the album, Foiled for the Last Time, was released on September 25, 2007, which includes fourteen of the Live at Stubb's tracks as well as a new version of "Calling You" and two remixes of "X Amount of Words".

Foiled remains Blue October's best-selling and most popular album, with the two hit singles "Hate Me" and "Into the Ocean" being Blue October's most popular and recognizable songs, which have become rock radio and concert staples for the band. Although Blue October had been touring and releasing albums for eleven years prior to the release of the album, Foiled put them on the map and resulted in a surge in popularity for the band. For the next ten years, each of the band's subsequent albums would chart in the top 20, and the band continues to perform sold-out tours.

In 2020, Blue October's tour was canceled due to the COVID-19 pandemic. On April 17, 2020, frontman Justin Furstenfeld performed two sold-out back-to-back online concerts on Stageit, in which he performed the Foiled album in its entirety. In 2026, for the 20th anniversary of Foiled, Blue October released the album on vinyl and plans to embark on a tour of Europe and North America in which they play the album in its entirety at each concert. The deluxe edition of the album included two of the bonus tracks originally released with Foiled for the Last Time as well as an acoustic version of "Hate Me" that was only previously available as a limited edition single or as a b-side on the "Hate Me" CD single.

== Track listing ==
All tracks written by Justin Furstenfeld except for tracks 1, 10, and 13, co-written by Matt Noveskey, Patrick Sugg, and C.B. Hudson, respectively.

No.	Title	Length
1.	"You Make Me Smile"	4:21
2.	"She's My Ride Home"	4:41
3.	"Into the Ocean"	3:59
4.	"What If We Could"	4:03
5.	"Hate Me"	6:20
6.	"Let It Go"	4:03
7.	"Congratulations" (featuring Imogen Heap)	4:01
8.	"Overweight"	4:24
9.	"X Amount of Words"	4:14
10.	"Drilled a Wire Through My Cheek"	4:32
11.	"Sound of Pulling Heaven Down"	4:42
12.	"Everlasting Friend"	4:05
13.	"18th Floor Balcony"	4:32
14.	"It’s Just Me [Hidden Track]"	4:40

Deluxe Edition Bonus Tracks
No.	Title	Length
14.	"Hate Me [acoustic]"	3:57
15.	"X Amount of Words [Paul Oakenfold Remix]"	4:08
16.	"X Amount of Words [Carmen Rizzo Remix]"	5:42

Note: Official music videos for "Congratulations", "18th Floor Balcony" and "She's My Ride Home" were released in 2026.

== Charts ==
=== Weekly charts ===
Weekly chart performance for Foiled
Chart (2006–07)	Peak position
Canadian Albums (Billboard)	21
New Zealand Albums (RMNZ)	40
US Billboard 200	29
US Top Rock Albums (Billboard)	8

=== Year-end charts ===
2006 year-end chart performance for Foiled
Chart (2006)	Position
US Billboard 200	87
US Top Rock Albums (Billboard)	15

2007 year-end chart performance for Foiled
Chart (2007)	Position
US Billboard 200	150

== Certifications ==
Certifications for Foiled
Region	Certification	Certified units/sales
Canada (Music Canada)	Platinum	100,000^{^}
United States (RIAA)	Platinum	1,000,000^{^}
^{^} Shipments figures based on certification alone.

== Personnel ==
- Justin Furstenfeld — vocals, guitar, producer
- Jeremy Furstenfeld — drums
- C.B. Hudson — guitar
- Matt Noveskey — bass
- Ryan Delahoussaye — violin, keyboards
- Sarah Donaldson — cello
- Zayra Alvarez — vocals on "Into the Ocean" (track 3)
- Imogen Heap — vocals on "Congratulations" (track 7)
- Kirk Baxley — vocals on "Drilled a Wire Through My Cheek" (track 10)
- Jose Alcantar — producer, mixing
- David Castell — producer, mixing
- Phil Kaffel — mixing
- Patrick Leonard — producer, mixing
- Michael Perfitt — mixing
- Chick Reed — producer, mixing
- Joe Spix — art direction, design
- Paul Oakenfold — mixing
- Carmen Rizzo — mixing
