= The Answers =

Studio album by Blue October
- Released: January 3, 1998
- Recorded: October 1997
- Genre: Alternative rock
- Length: 57:07
- Label: RoDan Entertainment/Scoop
- Producers: Brian Baker and Justin Furstenfeld

Blue October chronology
The Answers (1998)	Consent to Treatment (2000)

Professional ratings
Review scores
Source	Rating
Houston Press	(favorable)
AllMusic	
Sputnikmusic	4/5 stars
Confront Magazine	10/10 stars

The Answers is the first album by the American rock band Blue October. It was recorded in October 1997, at Sound Arts Studio in Houston, Texas. It was released in the United States, on January 3, 1998, by RoDan Entertainment/Scoop. It is Blue October's only album featuring founding member and bass guitarist Liz Mullally, who also played piano on the album.

For several years, the band was not allowed to sell the album on its website or at concerts because of its contract with Universal Records. The album was only available by mail order directly from RoDan (Justin and Jeremy Furstenfeld's parents Roann and Dan Furstenfeld, who managed the band at the beginning) until an agreement was reached in 2005.

The album was re-released in the US by Universal Records in 2008. However, the re-released version was packaged in a digipak and did not include the booklet that accompanied the original version of the album. The Answers was also originally released on cassette tape in addition to CD. Cassette versions of the album are extremely rare, and have become collector's items among Blue October fans. A remastered version of the album was released on translucent colored vinyl in 2024 as part of Blue October's "Collected Series" box set, which included their first four albums. A limited edition stand-alone version of the album was released on translucent black vinyl in 2025. The stand-alone vinyl version of the album features an etching of an orchid on the reverse side of the second record.

Between January and April 2018, the album became unavailable on various streaming services, such as Apple Music and Spotify. The reason for this change is unknown, but the rest of the band's catalogue remains on the platforms.

Many of the songs on the album deal with themes of depression, including "Black Orchid", which is about suicide.

== Track listing ==
All songs written by Justin Furstenfeld.

Side one
No.	Title	Length
1.	"The Answer"	5:56
2.	"Two A.M. Lovesick"	3:07
3.	"The 21st"	4:08
4.	"Breakfast After Ten"	3:01
Total length:		16:12

Side two
No.	Title	Length
1.	"Italian Radio"	3:52
2.	"For My Brother"	5:28
3.	"Sweet and Somber Pigeon Wings"	5:13
4.	"Weaknesses"	4:11
5.	"Blue Sunshine"	4:38
Total length:		23:22

Side three
No.	Title	Length
1.	"Mr. Blue's Menu"	3:24
2.	"Darkest Side of Houston's Finest Day"	4:13
3.	"Tomorrow"	3:47
4.	"Black Orchid"	6:09
Total length:		17:33

== Personnel ==
- Brian Baker – producer, engineer, mastering, mixing
- Adrian Garcia – assistant engineer
- Jeff Wells – mastering
- Ryan Delahoussaye – mandolin, violin
- Jeremy Furstenfeld – percussion, drums
- Justin Furstenfeld – lyrics, guitars, vocals, piano, drums
- Liz Mullaly – bass guitar, piano
