= Ugly Side: An Acoustic Evening with Blue October =

Ugly Side: An Acoustic Evening With Blue October

Live album by Blue October
- Released: May 10, 2011
- Recorded: July 22–25, 2010
- Genre: Alternative rock
- Length: 54:05
- Label: Up/Down, Brando Records
- Producer: Jeremy Furstenfeld

Blue October chronology
Approaching Normal (2009)	Ugly Side: An Acoustic Evening With Blue October (2011)	Any Man in America (2011)

Ugly Side: An Acoustic Evening With Blue October is a live acoustic album by Blue October. It is their third live album, and eighth album overall. The album was recorded during a sold out three-day tour of Houston, Austin, and Dallas July 22–25, 2010 during which the band played two acoustic concerts each night (except in Austin). The band had talked about recording an acoustic album as early as 2004, but the concerts were the first ever full-length acoustic shows that the band had ever performed. The popularity of the acoustic concerts among Blue October fans resulted in the band deciding to perform a nationwide acoustic tour to support the release of the album.

Originally slated for April 26, 2011, the official release date was pushed back to May 10, 2011; however the band released the album on May 3 to fans who pre-ordered the album from the band's website, and the album was available for sale at the band's concerts prior to May 10.

All of the songs on the album had previously appeared on Blue October's studio albums, except for the track Colorado 5591, which the band had played at shows for years but never recorded. The song is about Justin Furstenfeld's experience as a patient in a psychiatric hospital. The versions of the songs that appear on the album were selected by Blue October drummer Jeremy Furstenfeld, who is credited as the album's producer.

The album's cover is a photo of the marquee at the Paramount Theatre in Austin, Texas taken by Blue October roadie Dave Arnold.

The album peaked at No. 14 on the Billboard Independent Albums Chart, at No. 22 on the Top Rock Albums Chart, and No. 79 on the Billboard 200.

AllMusic rated it three stars and noted, "Ugly Side: An Acoustic Evening with Blue October finds the platinum-selling, Texas-based quintet toning things down a bit."

== Track listing ==
No.	Title	Length
1.	"Ugly Side"	4:45
2.	"The Answer"	5:26
3.	"Dirt Room"	3:41
4.	"Come in Closer"	4:48
5.	"Into the Ocean"	4:30
6.	"Colorado 5591"	4:14
7.	"Picking Up Pieces"	4:39
8.	"Tomorrow"	3:52
9.	"X Amount of Words"	5:48
10.	"Amazing"	6:15
11.	"The End"	6:06
Total length:		54:05

Digital Bonus Tracks
No.	Title	Length
12.	"Schizophrenia"	4:03
13.	"Jump Rope"	3:26

== Personnel ==
- Justin Furstenfeld – lead vocals, acoustic guitar
- Jeremy Furstenfeld – drums, producer
- Matt Noveskey – acoustic bass guitar, vocals
- C.B. Hudson – acoustic guitar, vocals
- Ryan Delahoussaye – mandolin, violin, keyboard, vocals
- Alan Adams – percussion
- Dave Arnold – photographer
- Abel Longoria – photographer
- Tim Palmer – mixing
- Travis Kennedy – mixing assistant
- Travis Hatem – live sound mixing engineer/Live audio multi track recording engineer
- Jerry Tubb – mastering
