= Spinning the Truth Around =

Studio album by Blue October
- Released: October 14, 2022 (Part 1); October 13, 2023 (Part 2)
- Genre: Alternative rock
- Length: 57:34 (Part 1); 61:57 (Part 2)
- Labels: Up/Down, Brando
- Producer: Justin Furstenfeld

Blue October chronology
This Is What I Live For (2020)	Spinning the Truth Around (2022)	Happy Birthday (2024)

Singles from Spinning the Truth Around
- 1. "Spinning the Truth Around" Released: July 15, 2022; 2. "Where Did You Go? I'm Less of a Mess These Days" Released: September 13, 2022; 3. "Shut Up, I Want You to Love Me Back" Released: October 17, 2022; 4. "How Can You Love Me If You Don't Even Like Me?" Released: November 13, 2022; 5. "Down Here Waiting" Released: June 23, 2023; 6. "All I See Is You" Released: September 22, 2023

Spinning the Truth Around is an album by American band Blue October. It is a double album, released in two separate parts. Part 1 was released on October 14, 2022. Part 2 was released one year later on October 13, 2023. The title track was Part 1's lead single, and was positively compared to Bruce Springsteen.

Due to their inability to tour during the COVID-19 pandemic, the band had more time to write new songs and quickly found themselves with more than two album's worth of songs, hence the decision to release a double album. Justin Furstenfeld co-wrote several songs with Smashing Pumpkins frontman Billy Corgan, who came up with melodies. The song "The Girl Who Stole My Heart" was conceived after Justin heard an instrumental demo from the 1990s by the band Idaho that had been posted on Instagram. He secured permission from Idaho songwriter Jeff Martin to write lyrics to the music, and Martin was given co-writing credit. The Blue October version was initially released as a Christmas single in December 2020. The song "How Can You Love Me If You Don't Even Like Me?" contains a sample of an interview with Ruth Lion, wife of Blue Note Records founder Alfred Lion, discussing how when a woman is married to a musician, she learned that the music always comes first, and the woman comes second. Justin Furstenfeld had become enamored with old blues and jazz records, and used samples from several Blue Note songs throughout the albums.

Although the two parts of the album were released separately on different dates, it is considered a cohesive piece of art. The CD version of the album is packaged such that all the discs can be contained in a single digisleeve. The vinyl version of the album was released as separate stand-alone gatefolds. For the purposes of counting the number of Blue October albums, Parts 1 and 2 are counted as separate albums (akin to Use Your Illusion I and Use Your Illusion II by Guns N' Roses). The vinyl version of Part 1 of the album was released in three different variants - the standard version being red swirl, as well as a limited run of 600 blue swirl records, and 300 pressings of a limited edition black record with gold smoke inlay, which sold out the first day it was for sale. Part 2 was also released in three different vinyl variants, with the standard version being green, a limited edition blue, and 300 orange creamsicle color discs. The vinyl editions of Part 2 also contain the bonus instrumental track "The Flood".

The single "Where Did You Go? I'm Less of a Mess These Days" reached the top 20 on the alternative rock chart. The song was a successful radio hit for so many weeks that it actually caused a delay in the release of Part 2 of the album, as the band was hesitant to release new music while they had a single currently climbing the charts.

Recording for Part 2 wrapped up in May 2023, with the compiled files for the last song "A Better Man" sent off to be mixed on May 31. The final track listing for Part II was announced the next day, and the song "Down Here Waiting" was announced as the first single from Part 2. "Down Here Waiting" made its radio debut on June 14 and remained on the alternative chart for six months. Mastering of the album was completed by June 25, and the release date was announced for September 29, 2023, however the date was eventually moved back a few weeks, resulting in Part 2 being released almost exactly one year after the release of part 1. "Down Here Waiting" was released to online platforms on July 7, 2023. After its first week on radio, "Down Here Waiting" debuted at number 48 on the alternative rock chart, climbing to number 40 in its second week, becoming Blue October's nineteenth song to reach the top 40. The second single from Part 2, "All I See Is You" was release September 22, 2023. Upon release, Spinning the Truth Around (Part 2) debuted at #1 on the iTunes Top Alternative Rock Albums chart. Significant events affecting the themes of the album were the cancer diagnosis and death of Justin and Jeremy Furstenfeld's father, as well as the collapse of Justin's marriage during the COVID-19 lockdown.

A third installment Spinning The Truth Around (Part 3) was originally planned to be a collection of remixes of songs from Blue October's past five albums. It was retitled Happy Birthday and was released on Justin Furstenfeld's 49th birthday, December 14, 2024.

== Track listing ==
Part 1
No.	Title	Writer(s)	Length
1.	"Spinning the Truth Around"	Justin Furstenfeld	4:49
2.	"The Shape of Your Heart"	Justin Furstenfeld, Jeremy Furstenfeld	4:29
3.	"How Can You Love Me If You Don't Even Like Me?"	Justin Furstenfeld, Eric Holtz, Will Knaak	4:21
4.	"Don't Say It Wasn't Love"	Justin Furstenfeld, Eric Holtz, Billy Corgan, Matthew Ostrander	5:34
5.	"Change"	Justin Furstenfeld, Eric Holtz, Steve Schiltz, Matt Noveskey, Kelsey Flanagan	3:41
6.	"Where Did You Go? I'm Less of a Mess These Days"	Justin Furstenfeld, Dwight Baker	3:20
7.	"The Kitchen Drawer"	Justin Furstenfeld, Eric Holtz, Ryan Delahoussaye, Will Knaak, Matthew Ostrander	4:28
8.	"When Love Isn't Good Enough"	Justin Furstenfeld, Eric Holtz	7:14
9.	"Trust You"	Justin Furstenfeld, Eric Holtz, Jayson Peters	4:19
10.	"The Girl Who Stole My Heart"	Justin Furstenfeld, Eric Holtz, Jeff Martin	6:11
11.	"Shut Up. I Want You to Love Me Back"	Justin Furstenfeld, Ryan Delahoussaye	4:38
12.	"Big Love"	Justin Furstenfeld, Eric Holtz	4:27
Total length:			57:31

Part 2
No.	Title	Writer(s)	Length
1.	"Sideways"	Justin Furstenfeld	4:41
2.	"All I See Is You"	Justin Furstenfeld, Eric Holtz	4:33
3.	"Sobriety"	Justin Furstenfeld, Eric Holtz, Billy Corgan	5:32
4.	"Magic Isn't Real"	Justin Furstenfeld, Eric Holtz	3:37
5.	"Leave Room for a Miracle"	Justin Furstenfeld, Eric Holtz	4:03
6.	"Last Look Moving Forward"	Justin Furstenfeld, Matthew Ostrander	4:17
7.	"Down Here Waiting"	Justin Furstenfeld, Eric Holtz, Steve Schiltz	4:23
8.	"Goodbye to the Old Days"	Justin Furstenfeld, Eric Holtz, Ryan Delahoussaye	4:30
9.	"Slow Down"	Justin Furstenfeld, Eric Holtz	5:23
10.	"1222 Bay Oaks Street"	Justin Furstenfeld, Eric Holtz, Matthew Ostrander	5:24
11.	"A Better Man"	Justin Furstenfeld, Eric Holtz	6:20
12.	"Down Here Waiting" (Mark Needham mix)	Justin Furstenfeld, Eric Holtz, Steve Schiltz	4:28
13.	"A Better Man" (Brooklyn mix)	Justin Furstenfeld, Eric Holtz	4:46
14.	"The Flood^"	Justin Furstenfeld, Eric Holtz	7:33
Total length:			61:57

^ Vinyl only bonus track

== Personnel ==
- Justin Furstenfeld – vocals, guitar, producer
- Jeremy Furstenfeld – drums
- Matthew Ostrander – guitar, gang vocals
- Matt Noveskey – bass
- Ryan Delahoussaye – violin, keyboards
- Will Knaak – guitar
- Steve Schiltz – bass, guitar, vocals
- Eric Holtz – engineering, mixing
- Mark Needham – mixing
- Phil Tan – mixing
- Jayson Peters – assistant engineer, piano
- Sus Vasquez – guitar
- Jenna Ren – vocals
- Benjamin Ruiz – vocals
- Mike Cross – vocals
- Jacqui Walker – vocals
- Gil Jenkins – vocals
- Joanna Howerton – vocals
- Collin Friedli – vocals
- Dayne Reliford – piano
- Chris Barber – album art
- Dave Arnold – photographer
- Tim Beck – album art
- Marshall Breedlove – assistant engineer
- Bill Zimmerman – mixing
- Colin Leonard – mastering

== Charts ==
Chart performance for Spinning the Truth Around – Part I
Chart (2022)	Peak position
UK Album Downloads (Official Charts)	78

Chart performance for Spinning the Truth Around – Part II
Chart (2023)	Peak position
UK Album Downloads (Official Charts)	77
