= Argue with a Tree... =

Argue With a Tree...

Live album by Blue October
- Released: September 15, 2004
- Recorded: June 4, 2004
- Genre: Alternative rock
- Length: 57:46 (Disc 1); 65:13 (Disc 2)
- Label: Brando/Universal

Blue October chronology
History for Sale (2003)	Argue With a Tree... (2004)	Foiled (2006)

Professional ratings
Review scores
Source	Rating
Allmusic	3/5 stars

Argue with a Tree... is a double live album/concert film by Blue October. It is their first live album and their fourth CD overall. The title of the album is a lyric in the song "Weight of the World". The album was recorded live on June 4, 2004 at Lakewood Theater in Dallas, Texas. It was released as a double CD and DVD in the United States in September 2004, by Brando/Universal Records. A remastered version of the album was released on translucent colored vinyl in 2024 as part of Blue October's "Collected Series" box set, which included their first four albums. A limited edition stand-alone version of the album was released on translucent black vinyl in 2025.

The set includes live versions of songs from all of Blue October's studio albums at the time, as well as the then unreleased tracks "PRN" and "18th Floor Balcony", and early versions of "Weight of the World" and "Sound of Pulling Heaven Down". A studio version of "PRN" was eventually released in 2015 on Ryan Delahoussaye's solo debut Tufstrings. "18th Floor Balcony" and "Sound of Pulling Heaven Down" were released on Foiled in 2006, and "Weight of the World" was the opening track on 2009's Approaching Normal. Argue With a Tree... is the only Blue October release to feature bass guitarist Piper Skih.

== Track listing ==
=== CD 1 ===
1. "Retarded Disfigured Clown (Intro)" / "Amnesia" – 4:59
2. "Independently Happy" – 5:25
3. "H.R.S.A." – 4:33
4. "Drop" – 4:24
5. "Sexual Powertrip" – 3:41
6. "Clumsy Card House" – 4:07
7. "Blue Sunshine" – 6:13
8. "Balance Beam" – 4:01
9. "Quiet Mind" – 4:23
10. "Inner Glow" – 4:17
11. "Ugly Side" – 5:11
12. "Black Orchid" – 6:32

=== CD 2 ===
1. "For My Brother" – 6:22
2. "Breakfast After 10" – 5:17
3. "Calling You" – 4:15
4. "Italian Radio" – 4:22
5. "Somebody" – 4:25
6. "Razorblade" – 4:37
7. "Chameleon Boy" – 6:52
8. "James" – 6:13
9. "Amazing" – 6:30
10. "Weight of the World" – 4:03
11. "PRN" – 5:20
12. "Come in Closer" – 5:12 (featuring guest vocalist Zayra Alvarez)
13. "The Sound of Pulling Heaven Down" – 1:45

== DVD ==
In addition to the live concert, the DVD bonus features included the following sections:

- Confessionals, in which fans share stories about how Blue October's music has touched their lives.
- Sidewalk Chalk, in which singer/songwriter Justin Furstenfeld tells the stories behind the songs of History for Sale.
- Soundcheck, featuring an early version of the Foiled track "She's My Ride Home".
- Radio, which features videos of Blue October's various live-on-radio performances.
- Video, which includes music videos of "Calling You" and "Razorblade".
- "18th Floor Balcony", the last song of the concert was included on the DVD but not the CD.

== Personnel ==
- Justin Furstenfeld - lead vocals, rhythm guitar
- Jeremy Furstenfeld - drums, backing vocals
- C.B. Hudson - lead guitar, backing vocals
- Ryan Delahoussaye - violin, mandolin, keyboard, backing vocals
- Piper Skih - bass guitar, midi pedals, backing vocals
- Zayra Alvarez - vocals
- Paul J. Armstrong - camera operator
- Michael Cain - executive producer
- David Castell - production, mixing, audio engineering, sound design
- David Jack Daniels - mixing
- Edwin A. Harris - editing
- Chuck Hatcher - photography
- Chad Wandel - Cover Photo
- Elijah Wandel - Cover Model
- Rick Kirkham - camera operator
- Mike Swinford - executive producer
- King Hollis - director
