= Consent to Treatment =

Studio album by Blue October
- Released: August 15, 2000
- Recorded: 1999/2000
- Genre: Alternative rock
- Length: 56:34
- Label: Universal
- Producer: Nick Launay

Blue October chronology
The Answers (1998)	Consent to Treatment (2000)	History for Sale (2003)

Singles from Consent to Treatment
- 1. "James" Released: 2000; 2. "Breakfast After 10" Released: 2000

Professional ratings
Review scores
Source	Rating
Allmusic	4/5 stars
Fort Worth Star-Telegram	3/5 stars

Consent to Treatment is the second album by Blue October. Pre-production sessions took place in Nashville with producer Blue Miller, and the final album recording sessions took place at Bay 7 Studios in Valley Village and Media Vortex in Burbank, California with producer Nick Launay. The album was released in the United States on August 15, 2000, by Universal Records. It is the band's first major-label album and their only album to feature former member Brant Coulter on guitar as well as their first album featuring Matt Noveskey. The opening track is a spoken poem written by Justin Furstenfeld and recited by Blue Miller. Ryan Smith sings the female backing vocals on "The Answer" and "Balance Beam." The album was originally released on cassette and compact disc. A remastered version of the album was released on translucent colored vinyl in 2024 as part of Blue October's "Collected Series" box set, which included their first four albums. A limited edition stand-alone version of the album was released on translucent black vinyl in 2025.

The cover art was inspired by Peter Gabriel's music videos for "Sledgehammer" and “Digging in the Dirt”.

Matt Noveskey has said that Nick Launay was extremely nurturing in response to Noveskey's inquisitiveness during the Consent to Treatment production process, which was the impetus for Noveskey pursuing a career as a producer himself.

== Track listing ==
All tracks written by Justin Furstenfeld except for "James", cowritten with Matt Noveskey.

No.	Title	Length
1.	"Retarded Disfigured Clown"	0:42
2.	"Independently Happy"	4:55
3.	"James"	4:29
4.	"HRSA"	3:33
5.	"Breakfast After 10"	4:28
6.	"Balance Beam"	3:50
7.	"Holler"	3:23
8.	"Schizophrenia"	3:54
9.	"Drop"	4:35
10.	"Conversation Via Radio (Do You Ever Wonder)"	4:03
11.	"Angel"	5:05
12.	"Libby I'm Listening"	3:31
13.	"Amnesia"	3:55
14.	"The Answer"	6:11

== Personnel ==
- Justin Furstenfeld - lead vocals, guitar
- Brant Coulter - lead guitar
- Matt Noveskey - bass and acoustic guitars, backing vocals, sleeve art,
- George Winston - piano
- Ryan Delahoussaye - violin, mandolin
- Eric Gorfain - violin
- Jane Scarpantoni - cello, string arrangements
- Jeremy Furstenfeld - drums
- Blue Miller - vocals, producer, mixing
- Ryan Smith - backing vocals
- Martin Klemm - assistant engineer
- David Ahlert - assistant engineer
- Kevin Page - assistant engineer
- Greg Archilla - production, mixing
- Nick Launay - producer, engineer, mixing
- Bob Ludwig - mastering
