= Approaching Normal =

Studio album by Blue October
- Released: March 24, 2009
- Recorded: August 18, 2008 – October 24, 2008 in Austin, Texas and Tokyo, Japan
- Genre: Alternative rock
- Length: 48:10 (Explicit version); 48:03 (Edited version)
- Label: Universal
- Producer: Steve Lillywhite

Blue October chronology
Foiled for the Last Time (2007)	Approaching Normal (2009)	Ugly Side: An Acoustic Evening With Blue October (2011)

Blue October studio album chronology
Foiled (2006)	Approaching Normal (2009)	Any Man in America (2011)

Singles from Approaching Normal
- 1. "Dirt Room" Released: December 23, 2008; 2. "Say It" Released: April 24, 2009; 3. "Jump Rope" Released: November 20, 2009; 4. "Should Be Loved" Released: April 9, 2010

Approaching Normal is the fifth studio album by alternative rock band Blue October. The album was released on March 24, 2009 and debuted at number thirteen on the Billboard charts. It was Blue October's first album to be released on vinyl. The album was re-released on frosted white vinyl in 2026 as part of the Collected Series 2006–2011 box set.

== Background ==
Justin Furstenfeld unveiled the title and tentative track listing on Blue October's website on January 31, 2008. Pre-production of the album began at the beginning of 2008 with demos being recorded at 5am Studio in Austin, Texas. The recording sessions for the album began on August 18, 2008, and were completed on October 24, 2008, with the band recording the album at Willie Nelson's Pedernales Studios near Austin with Grammy–winning producer Steve Lillywhite. They also recorded part of the album in Sony Recordings in Tokyo, Japan. Post-production was completed on January 8, 2009.

The track listing consists of several new songs, as well as songs that Blue October and 5591 have performed live. An early version of "Weight of the World" had been played live at nearly every concert on the band's 2004, including the recording of their 2004 live album, Argue With a Tree. The song "Say It" was first performed at KDGE's Edgefest 17 on April 27, 2008. The festival was Steve Lillywhite's first time seeing Blue October perform, and the band's set, especially the song "Say It" cemented his desire to produce Blue October's next album.

During an interview with the music webzine Playback:Stl, Justin described the song "Blue Skies" as being one of the few happy songs he has written, saying, "There's nothing negative about it. It's all about beauty. It's really, really pretty and really, really happy, but it's going to be rocked out so crazy that people will kind of forget that it's a lovey lovey, dovey song."

During concerts on July 4 and 5, 2008, Justin Furstenfeld confirmed that "Say It" and "Weight of the World" would be on the new album. On July 23, 2008, during a web chat with fans, Jeremy Furstenfeld confirmed the song "Dirt Room" would be on the album, and that of the new songs the band was recording, it was his favorite. Justin Furstenfeld first performed the songs "Blue Skies" and "My Never" at Stephenie Meyer's Breaking Dawn concerts in August 2008. Furstenfeld also confirmed March 2009 as the anticipated release date for the album.

The first single from the album, "Dirt Room" was performed live by the band during concerts in December 2008. Immediately following the concerts, radio stations in Austin, Dallas and Houston put the song into rotation. The single reached radio nationally on January 13, 2009, and was available to digital outlets on December 23, 2008. The song "Say It" is the second single and was released on April 24, 2009. The song "Should Be Loved" is the third single.

Blue October released the song "Graceful Dancing" via an email gift to the public on January 7, 2009. The song "Kangaroo Cry" was released on the NCIS official soundtrack on February 10, 2009 and featured in the coda of the season 7 Christmas episode, "Faith".

The album was released for pre-order on March 3, 2009. Approaching Normal entered the Billboard 200 chart at number 13 with sales of 33,778 and fell out of the top 50 in its second week. It also peaked at number 5 on the Top Rock Albums chart. The album has sold 185,978 units to date.

== Controversy ==
The song "The End" is about a man whose wife leaves him for a new lover. The man sneaks into his house and sees his wife and her new lover having sex and murders them both before turning the gun on himself. The song's controversial lyrics were used against Justin Furstenfeld during his divorce and parental custody hearing, with his ex-wife's lawyer claiming that the song was written about her and was released in order to threaten her. Justin claimed that the song was written about an incident that occurred in a neighborhood where he lived before he met his ex-wife.

== Song selection ==
On October 21, 2008, Justin Furstenfeld confirmed the twelve songs to be released on the album. and that two versions of the album would be released; one version with explicit lyrics, and one version with censored lyrics. A different bonus track would be included on each version. Approaching Normal is also the first Blue October album to be released on vinyl, with the vinyl version including all the bonus tracks.

== Critical reception ==
Professional ratings
Review scores
Source	Rating
AllMusic	2/5 stars
Arkansas Democrat Gazette	favorable
Billboard	favorable
Entertainment Weekly	B−
The Hollywood Reporter	favorable
People Magazine	2.5/5 stars
Rock Sound	7/10 stars
Rolling Stone	2/5 stars

Approaching Normal garnered mixed reviews from music critics. Billboard contributor Christa L. Titus praised Steve Lillywhite's production for delivering on the band's "penchant for emotive playing and tight rock chops", and Justin Furstenfeld's writing for crafting scenarios involving "lullabies to children ("Blue Does") and plucky life affirmations ("Jump Rope")". Clark Collis of Entertainment Weekly called the album "an often gloomy yet commercial-sounding collection" that gravitates towards Twilight author Stephenie Meyer and its fans for having "heartfelt muscularity" in the lyricism. Conversely, AllMusic's Andrew Leahey saw it as a smorgasbord of "post-grunge missteps and ill-advised detours into genres [far] beyond the band's grasp", criticizing Furstenfeld for being overly theatrical when singing unintentionally funny lyrics and added that his "vocal resemblance of Jack Black" and a reworking into the "tongue-in-cheek outlandishness" that Tenacious D have created before would make the record more listenable, concluding that "Blue October remain totally unaware of their own absurdity, however, which makes Approaching Normal the sort of cringe-worthy drama fest that inspires a ton of laughs but few repeated listens." Rolling Stone writer Mark Kemp also lamented Furstenfeld for disrupting his tragicomic melodrama with "self-indulgent pathos" to add to his band's growingly intolerable "post-grunge whinefest".

== Track listing ==
No.	Title	Writer(s)	Length
1.	"Weight of the World"	Justin Furstenfeld	4:05
2.	"Say It"	Justin Furstenfeld	3:38
3.	"Dirt Room"	Justin Furstenfeld, C.B. Hudson III*, Jeremy Furstenfeld*; Ryan Delahoussaye*, Matt Noveskey*	3:25
4.	"Been Down"	Justin Furstenfeld	4:19
5.	"My Never"	Justin Furstenfeld	3:47
6.	"Should Be Loved"	Justin Furstenfeld	4:02
7.	"Kangaroo Cry"	Justin Furstenfeld, Jeremy Furstenfeld*	4:53
8.	"Picking Up Pieces"	Justin Furstenfeld	4:22
9.	"Jump Rope"	Justin Furstenfeld	3:22
10.	"Blue Skies"	Justin Furstenfeld	3:44
11.	"Blue Does"	Justin Furstenfeld	3:27

Explicit album bonus track
No.	Title	Writer(s)	Length
12.	"The End"	Justin Furstenfeld, Patrick Leonard*	5:00

Clean album bonus track
No.	Title	Writer(s)	Length
12.	"Graceful Dancing"	Justin Furstenfeld	4:53

Limited edition LP
No.	Title	Writer(s)	Length
12.	"78Triple6"	Justin Furstenfeld, Jeremy Furstenfeld	3:40
13.	"Voice of a Friend"	Justin Furstenfeld	4:01
14.	"No One Listening"	Justin Furstenfeld	4:20
15.	"Graceful Dancing"	Justin Furstenfeld	4:53

UK Edition
No.	Title	Writer(s)	Length
12.	"Hate Me"	Justin Furstenfeld	6:20
13.	"Into the Ocean"	Justin Furstenfeld	3:59
14.	"Graceful Dancing" or "The End"	Justin Furstenfeld	4:53 or 5:00

== Personnel ==
- Justin Furstenfeld - vocals, guitar
- Jeremy Furstenfeld - drums, percussion
- Ryan Delahoussaye - violin, mandolin, keyboard, vocals
- C.B. Hudson - guitar, vocals
- Matt Noveskey - bass and acoustic guitars, vocals
- Produced by Steve Lillywhite
- Mixed by Steve Lillywhite and CJ Eiriksson
- Engineered by CJ Eiriksson
- Mastering: Gavin Lurssen at Lurssen Mastering
- Co-writer for "The End": Patrick Leonard
- A&R: Paul Nugent for Brando Records
- Executive Producer: Sylvia Rhone
- A&R Coordination: Elizabeth Vago for Universal Motown
- A&R Administration: Michele Goldberg for Universal Motown
- Art Direction: Joe Spix and Justin Furstenfeld
- Design: Joe Spix
- Photography: Chapman Baehler
- Photo Model: Kathryn Olsen
- Management: Paul Nugent, Mike Swinford and Randy Miller for Rainmaker Artists
- Booking Agent: Kevin Daly for Monterey International
- Label: Brando/Universal Motown

== Charts ==
Chart (2009)	Peak position
US Billboard 200	13
US Top Alternative Albums (Billboard)	4
US Top Rock Albums (Billboard)	5

=== Singles ===
"Jump Rope"
Chart (2009)	Peak position
German Media Control Charts	65
Luxembourg Billboard chart	8
