= Any Man in America =

Studio album by Blue October
- Released: August 16, 2011
- Recorded: 2010–2011
- Genres: Alternative rock; post-grunge; progressive rock
- Length: 62:05
- Labels: RED; Megaforce; earMusic; Up/Down; Brando
- Producer: Tim Palmer

Blue October chronology
Ugly Side: An Acoustic Evening With Blue October (2011)	Any Man in America (2011)	Sway (2013)

Blue October studio album chronology
Approaching Normal (2009)	Any Man in America (2011)	Sway (2013)

Singles from Any Man in America
- 1. "The Chills" Released: May 31, 2011; 2. "The Feel Again (Stay)" Released: June 14, 2011; 3. "The Worry List" Released: October 8, 2011

Any Man in America is the sixth studio album and ninth album overall by alternative rock band Blue October. The album was recorded at Matchbox Studios in Austin, Texas, between the summer of 2010 and March 2011. It was released August 16, 2011, by Justin Furstenfeld's Up/Down Records and distributed via RED Distribution. The album was produced by Tim Palmer, who mixed Blue October's album History for Sale (and previously worked with artists such as David Bowie, Robert Plant, The Cure, U2 and Pearl Jam). The artwork on the album cover is a drawing of Justin Furstenfeld by Tim Palmer's daughter Bluebell, who was three years old at the time.

The songs on the album are largely about Justin Furstenfeld's divorce and custody battle over his daughter Blue.

The first single from the album, "The Chills", became available for digital download May 31, and impacted radio June 27, 2011. On June 9, 2011, the band posted a video of the song "The Feel Again (Stay)", directed by Merritt Fields, on YouTube. Due to the overwhelming positive response to the video by fans, the band released the song on iTunes five days later. On Monday, July 25, 2011, the official music video for the first single, "The Chills", was released via the band's YouTube/Vevo channel.

Upon release, the album topped the Amazon.com album downloads chart. The album sold 27,275 copies in its first week, making it the highest-selling debut, the highest-selling alternative rock album, the second highest-selling independent album, and the eighth best selling album overall. The album was also popular on iTunes, where it was the best selling alternative album, and the fifth best selling album overall. The album debuted at number eight on the Billboard 200, making it the highest-charting album of Blue October's career, although their two previous studio albums actually sold more units in their first week of release. It peaked at number two on the Billboard Independent Albums chart and number one on the Top Rock Albums chart.

Any Man in America was originally released on CD, digital download, and limited edition vinyl. The album was re-released on black smoke vinyl in 2026, as part of the Collected Series 2006–2011 box set.

== Track listing ==
No.	Title	Writer(s)	Length
1.	"Everything (AM Limbo)"	Justin Furstenfeld	0:52
2.	"The Feel Again (Stay)"	Justin Furstenfeld	6:00
3.	"The Money Tree"	Justin Furstenfeld	4:59
4.	"For the Love"	Justin Furstenfeld	4:43
5.	"Drama Everything"	Justin Furstenfeld, Andy Sharp	4:30
6.	"The Chills"	Justin Furstenfeld, Tim Palmer	3:34
7.	"The Flight (Lincoln to Minneapolis)"	Justin Furstenfeld	6:45
8.	"Any Man in America"	Justin Furstenfeld	6:25
9.	"You Waited Too Long"	Justin Furstenfeld, Tim Palmer	4:28
10.	"The Honesty"	Justin Furstenfeld	4:22
11.	"The Getting Over It Part"	Justin Furstenfeld, Tim Palmer	4:38
12.	"The Worry List"	Justin Furstenfeld, Dwight Baker	4:33
13.	"The Follow Through"	Justin Furstenfeld	6:10

== Reviews ==
The album was released to mixed reviews, with AllMusic rating the album 2 out of 5 stars. According to AllMusic: "Justin Furstenfeld has no qualms about putting his domestic problems on display, and while heartache and ruin are well-worn rock & roll topics, self-indulgence works best when tempered with hooks, something Furstenfeld seems to have left at the crime scene." Diminuendo gave the album a volume setting of 9 out of 11. According to Diminuendo: "As long as they continue doing what they're good at – writing deeply personal, heart-wrenching lyrics – it doesn't matter where they venture musically. Any Man in America is a model to follow for great artists: an ever-changing sound with a signature lyrics and vocals."

Professional ratings
Review scores
Source	Rating
AllMusic	2/5 stars
Sputnikmusic	3.5/5 stars
MassLive.com	3/5 stars

== Personnel ==
- Justin Furstenfeld – vocals, guitar, production
- Steve Schiltz – guitars
- C.B. Hudson – guitar
- Patricia Lynn Drew – backing vocals, guest vocalist
- Ray Cordero – guest vocalist
- Brendan Bond – trumpet
- Dwight Baker – engineering
- Matt Noveskey – bass, guitar
- Jeremy Furstenfeld – drums, percussion
- Ryan Delahoussaye – violin, keyboard, mandolin
- Tim Palmer – guitars, production, engineering, mixing
- Abel Longoria – photography
- Bluebell Palmer – sleeve art
