= History for Sale =

Studio album by Blue October
- Released: April 8, 2003
- Recorded: 2003
- Genre: Alternative rock
- Length: 48:09
- Label: Brando; Universal
- Producer: David Castell; Justin Furstenfeld

Blue October chronology
Consent to Treatment (2000)	History for Sale (2003)	Argue with a Tree... (2004)

Blue October studio album chronology
Consent to Treatment (2000)	History for Sale (2003)	Foiled (2006)

Singles from History For Sale
- 1. "Calling You" Released: June 17, 2003

Professional ratings
Review scores
Source	Rating
Rocknworld.com	5/5 stars
Sputnikmusic	4/5 stars
Allmusic	2/5 stars
Houston Press	(favorable)
PopMatters	(favorable)

History for Sale is the third album by Blue October. The title of the album comes from a lyric in the song "Amazing". It was recorded at Sound Arts Studios in Houston, Texas, and at Stomp Box Studios in Arlington, Texas, and released in the United States on April 8, 2003, by Brando Records. It was co-produced by Justin Furstenfeld and David Castell. It is the only Blue October album to feature former member Dwayne Casey on bass guitar, and the band's first album featuring lead guitarist C.B. Hudson. The track "Come in Closer" features guest vocals by Zayra Alvarez, who later, on the CBS reality show Rock Star: Supernova, sang the song "Razorblade" on her final episode before being voted off. History for Sale was voted best album by the 2003 Houston Press Music Awards.

The album, re-released on Universal Records on August 5, 2003, is largely a response to the control the label placed on the group during the Consent to Treatment production process. The re-released version of the album includes a solo acoustic version of "Calling You" as a hidden track, while the original version of the album includes videos of the band during the recording process. A remastered version of the album was released on translucent colored vinyl in 2024 as part of Blue October's "Collected Series" box set, which included their first four albums. A limited edition stand-alone version of the album was released on translucent black vinyl in 2025.

== Track listing ==
All songs written by Justin Furstenfeld, except where noted.

No.	Title	Writer(s)	Length
1.	"Ugly Side"	Furstenfeld, Blue Miller	4:21
2.	"Clumsy Card House"		3:21
3.	"Razorblade"	Furstenfeld, Blue Miller, Ryan Delahoussaye, Matt Noveskey	3:18
4.	"Calling You"		3:59
5.	"Chameleon Boy"		5:48
6.	"Sexual Powertrip (One Big Lie) Bla Bla"		3:04
7.	"A Quiet Mind"		4:09
8.	"3 Weeks, She Sleeps"		1:48
9.	"Inner Glow"	Furstenfeld, Beth Miekos Mueller	4:25
10.	"Somebody"	Furstenfeld, Blue Miller, C.B. Hudson	3:26
11.	"Come in Closer"		5:25
12.	"Amazing"		5:05

== Personnel ==
- Justin Furstenfeld - lead vocals, guitar
- Jeremy Furstenfeld - drums
- Matt Noveskey - bass guitar on tracks 1, 3, 8, 9, 10
- Dwayne Casey - bass guitar on tracks 2, 4, 5, 6, 7
- C.B. Hudson - guitar
- Ryan Delahoussaye - violin, mandolin
- Zayra Alvarez - backing vocals
- Brian Baker - engineer, editing
- David Castell - flute (on "Come in Closer" and "3 Weeks She Sleeps"), programming, production, editing, synthesizer
- Robert Greeson - art direction
- Blue Miller - guitar, production, editing, mixing, keyboards
- Mark O'Donoughue - engineer
- Tim Palmer - mixing
- Sam Paulos - executive producer
- Derek Taylor - digital editing
