= David Castell =

American record producer

Dave Castell
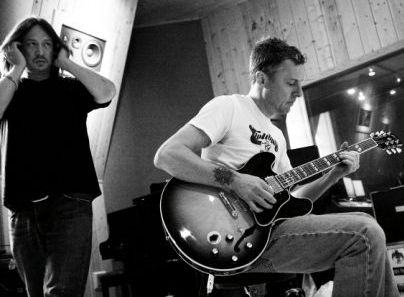
- Castell in the studio with Toadies/Burden Brothers frontman, Vaden Todd Lewis. April 22, 2008; Ft Worth, Texas. Photo by Scogin Mayo, courtesy of www.scoginmayo.com

Background information
- Born: October 9
- Origin: Dallas, Texas, USA
- Genres: Rock; Alternative; Pop; Electronic; Experimental; R&B
- Occupations: Music producer Recording engineer, Mixing engineer, and Mastering engineer; Songwriter, Arranger, Programmer and Musician
- Website: www.DavidCastell.com

David Castell is an American record producer, musician, and recording engineer based in Dallas, Texas.

Castell's recording career spans nearly three decades; his work with many major record labels and independent labels alike includes both platinum-selling national recording artists and unsigned regional acts, and a wide range of musical genres.

He has been instrumental in the career albums of Blue October, Burden Brothers, Course of Empire, Deep Blue Something, and SouthFM.

In spring 2008, Castell began production of the Toadies’ album No Deliverance, which was released on August 19th, 2008, on Kirtland Records.

After two years of collaboration with DFW-based electronic band Shock of Pleasure, their first full-length album Its About Time, was released on September 16th, 2008, by Universal Music Group, produced by David Castell.

Blue October's two disc set, Foiled For The Last Time, features a re-release of "Calling You", also produced by David Castell. Castell has also been named as the producer of Blue October's forthcoming 7th studio album Sway.

== Productions ==
- Deep Blue Something – Home (1994)
- Burden Brothers – Buried in Your Black Heart (2003)
- Blue October – History for Sale (2003)
- Burden Brothers – Mercy (2006)
- Blue October – Foiled (2006)
- Toadies – No Deliverance (2008)
- Blowing Trees – Blowing Trees (2008)
- Smile Smile – Truth on Tape (2010)
- Pawn Shop Gentlemen – The Breaks (2011)
- Meridian – Meridian EP (2012)
- Blue October – Sway (2013)
