= Justin Furstenfeld =

American musician (born 1975)

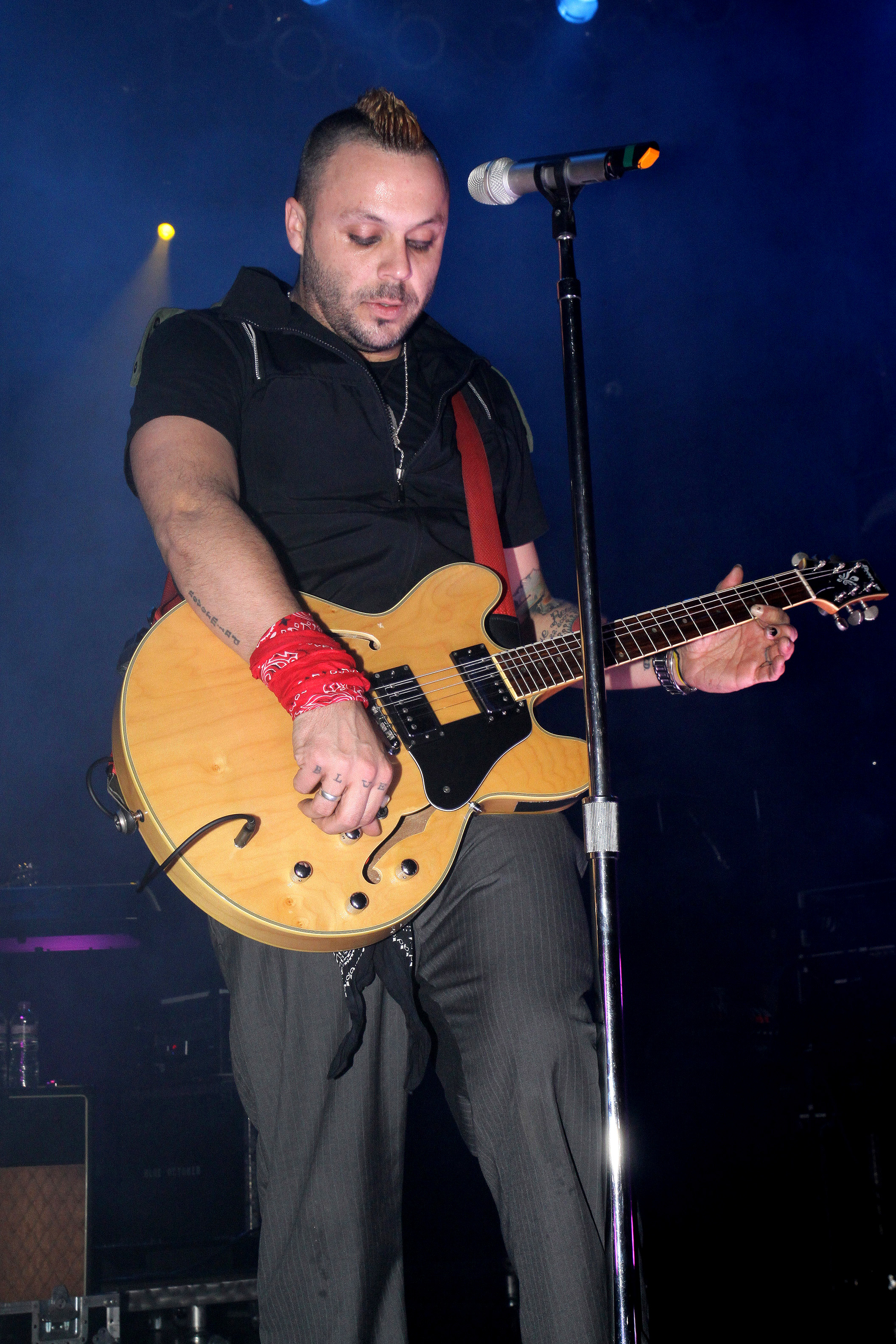
- Furstenfeld performing at the House of Blues in Chicago

Background information
- Born: Justin Steward Furstenfeld; December 14, 1975 (age 50)
- Genre: Rock
- Occupations: Musician, songwriter
- Instruments: Vocals, guitar
- Member of: Blue October, Harvard of the South
- Formerly of: The Last Wish

Justin Steward Furstenfeld (born December 14, 1975) is an American musician. He is the lead vocalist, guitarist, and lyricist of the rock band Blue October. He is also a member of the band Harvard of the South.

== Personal life ==
When not touring with his band, Furstenfeld resides in San Marcos, Texas. He is the brother of Blue October drummer Jeremy Furstenfeld. From his first marriage, he has a daughter born in 2007 to whom he dedicated the album Any Man in America. The album title refers to his experience as an American man treated poorly in a divorce proceeding. Furstenfeld's relationship with his daughter and ex-wife is the subject matter of much of the album.

Furstenfeld wed a second time in Texas in 2012, marrying Sarah. Together, they have a daughter born the same year. They had a son in 2016.

Furstenfeld was treated for depression at a Texas mental hospital in the late 1990s, after which Blue October recorded the album The Answers as an expression of themes surrounding depression and suicide. He was diagnosed with bipolar disorder following an anxiety attack in October 2009 aboard a jet airliner. The band canceled their tour while he was being treated in Minnesota and Texas hospitals. Furstenfeld said that problems associated with his first marriage caused a stress blackout, exacerbated by alcohol consumption. He said in 2021 that he has been sober since May 2012. In 2020 a documentary was released called "Get Back Up" that addresses Furstenfeld's experiences with depression, addiction, and recovery.

== Music career ==
Growing up, Furstenfeld listened to hip-hop, rock, country, and dance; his favorite artists included Idaho, Marvin Gaye, The Smiths, Peter Gabriel, Red House Painters, The Cure, Cocteau Twins, Bauhaus, and Pink Floyd. He also counts among his influences Michael Stipe, The Pixies, Elliott Smith, Blue Miller, George Winston, Jean-Michel Basquiat, and U2. His first musical memory was Roy Orbison's ballad "Crying".

During his high school years at Houston's High School for the Performing and Visual Arts (HSPVA), he formed the band The Last Wish, which he played in from the age of 13 until 1995. When performing solo, Furstenfeld uses the moniker 5591.

In August 2008, Furstenfeld toured with Stephenie Meyer, author of the Twilight series, in a sold-out four-city book/concert tour.

== Other interests ==
In April 2009, Furstenfeld published the book Crazy Making – The Words and Lyrics of Justin Furstenfeld, in which he goes into explicit detail about the inspiration behind every Blue October song to date.

Furstenfeld attended Kinder High School for the Performing and Visual Arts, acted in several plays in high school, and appeared in the 1996 film Late Bloomers. He made his true feature film debut in the 2022 Christian Sesma directed action film Section Eight playing the character Ajax Abernathy. Furstenfeld's original song "This is What I Live For" also played during film's opening credits. In 2022 Justin acted in the film Lights Out, also directed by Sesma.

== Discography ==
Solo albums

- Songs from an Open Book (2014)
- Open Book Winter Album (2017)
- It's Just Me (2026)

With The Last Wish

- Rooftop Sessions (1993)
- The First of February (1995)

With Blue October

- The Answers (1998)
- Consent to Treatment (2000)
- History for Sale (2003)
- Argue with a Tree... (2004)
- Foiled (2006)
- Foiled for the Last Time (2007)
- Approaching Normal (2009)
- Ugly Side: An Acoustic Evening with Blue October (2011)
- Any Man in America (2011)
- Sway (2013)
- Things We Do at Night (Live from Texas) (2015)
- Home (2016)
- I Hope You're Happy (2018)
- Live From Manchester (2019)
- This Is What I Live For (2020)
- Spinning the Truth Around (Part I) (2022)
- Spinning the Truth Around (Part II) (2023)
- Happy Birthday (2024)
- Storytelling (2026)

With Harvard of the South

- Miracle (2014 – EP)
- Harvard of the South (2020)

As a featured artist

- Canvas – Four Days Awake – "All About You"
- Tarja Turunen – Colours in the Dark – "Medusa"
- Zeale – FRNZ & FNGZ – "Invisible Prisons"
- Paco Estrada - Bedtime Stories - "When We Were Made"
- Matthew Ostrander – "Damn You"
- SteroRanger – "Won’t Give It Away"
