= Blue October =

American rock band

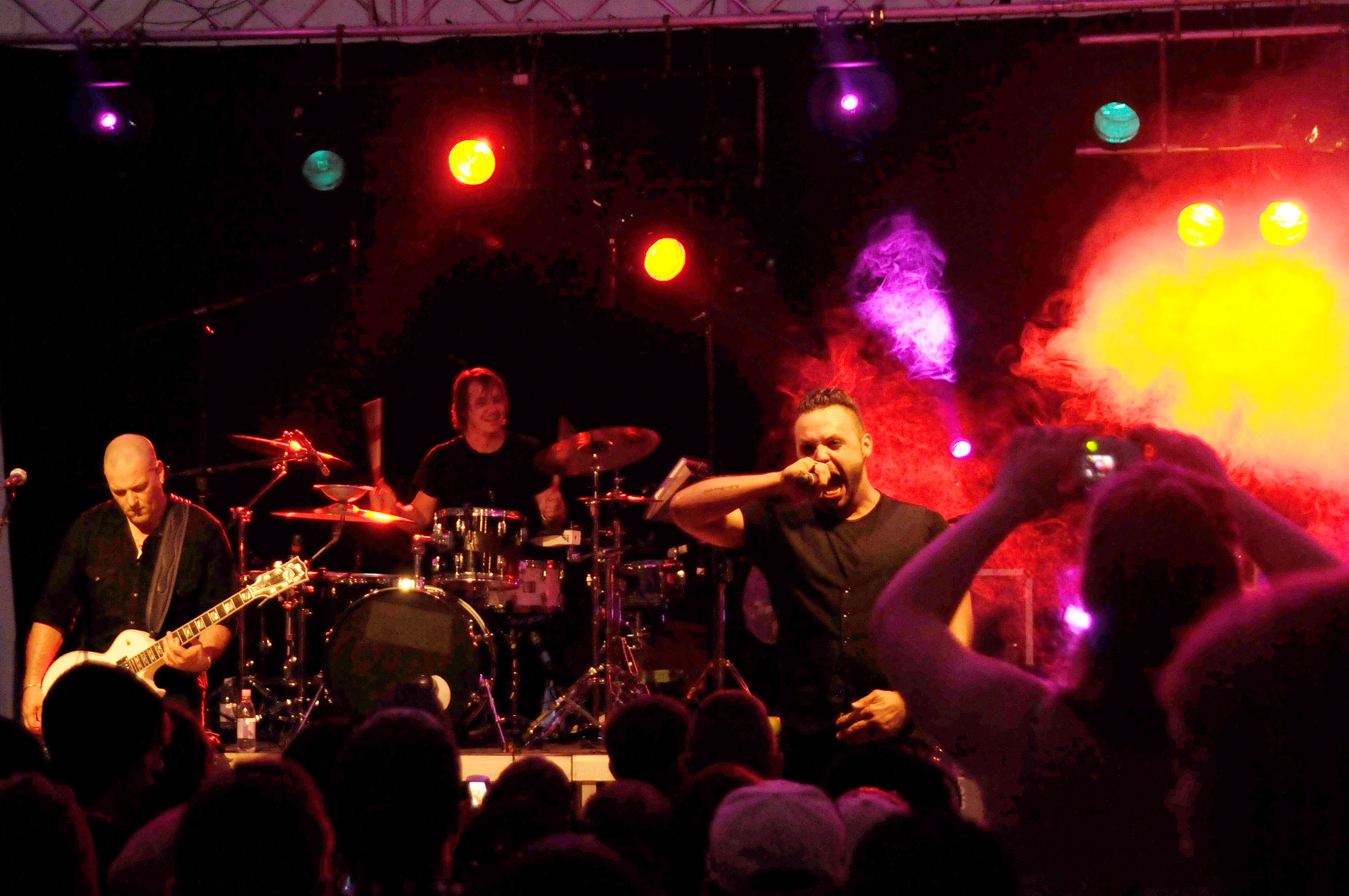
- Blue October in 2009

Background information
- Origin: Houston, Texas, U.S.
- Genres: Alternative rock; art rock; post-grunge; new wave; synth-pop; shoegaze
- Years active: 1995–present
- Labels: RoDan Entertainment/Scoop; Brando; Universal; Up/Down
- Spinoffs: Harvard of the South
- Members: Justin Furstenfeld; Ryan Delahoussaye; Jeremy Furstenfeld; Matt Noveskey; Will Knaak
- Past members: Liz Mulally; Brant Coulter; C.B. Hudson; Dwayne Casey; Piper Skih; Julian Mandrake; Matthew Ostrander; Will Knaak; Sus Vasquez; Steve Schiltz
- Website: blueoctober.com

Blue October is an American rock band originally from Houston, Texas, formed in 1995. It currently consists of singer/guitarist Justin Furstenfeld, drummer Jeremy Furstenfeld, multi-instrumentalist Ryan Delahoussaye, bassist Matt Noveskey, and lead guitarist Will Knaak.

The band has had twenty-one top 40 singles on the alternative rock chart over the span of thirteen studio albums, and is best known for its platinum singles "Hate Me" and "Into the Ocean" from their 2006 platinum album Foiled. Blue October has won numerous Houston Press music awards including Best New Act (1998), Best Pop/Rock artist (1999, 2000, 2002, 2003), and album of the Year for History for Sale in 2003. As of 2026, Blue October's songs have been streamed over 1.5 billion times.

== History ==
=== Early years and The Answers (1995–1998) ===
Blue October was formed by lead singer/songwriter/guitarist Justin Furstenfeld, his brother Jeremy and multi-instrumentalist Ryan Delahoussaye. The band was discovered by former Kid Rock manager Michael Rand performing at the Pappadeaux Cafe in Houston in 1998. His agency proceeded to book over 350 dates on the group unsigned. Extensive publicity and artist development was regimented. This work eventually led to Michael bringing the band to Universal Music Group CEO Doug Morris under the direction of longtime A & R Recording rep Reen Nalli. The group moved to San Marcos, Texas in December 1996.

Managed by Justin and Jeremy's parents under the name RoDan Entertainment, Blue October released their first album, The Answers in 1998. It was a well-received debut which sold over 5,000 copies in Houston alone. Due to a fan-based connection with ABC's KTRK-TV (Channel 13), Blue October was able to schedule an early-morning news performance – the band's first live television performance. Other unreleased songs from this period (which can now be found on YouTube) include "Rust", "Colorado 5591", "His Name Is Crazy", "Gun Metal Blue", "Dollar 30 Gravy" and "5 Day Walk".

Blue October caught the attention of the major record labels while working with producer dB (Don Byczynski) in early 1998. Pre-production started for getting Blue October a more "radio ready" sound, with new songs and to rewrite material off The Answers. Tracking was done in a studio setup at Justin's home in San Marcos.

=== Consent to Treatment and History for Sale (1999–2005) ===
After recordings were sent to Universal Records, Blue October signed to the label in 1999 for the release of their second album, Consent to Treatment. The band was dropped by Universal Records in 2000.

The band recruited a new guitarist, C.B. Hudson, and got back on the road. In November 2002, the band signed with Texas-based management company Rainmaker Artists. Rainmaker immediately signed the band to their record label Brando Records. Just before entering the studio Matt Noveskey left the band for personal reasons. The remaining band members persevered, entering the studio to record what would become their third album, History for Sale. The first single from History For Sale was "Calling You", released in February 2003. On March 20, 2003, radio station "102.1 the EDGE" in Dallas added "Calling You" to regular rotation, and it began to spread to radio stations across the country receiving over 56,585 spins on the US airwaves. Rainmaker took the band to New York, where the band played multiple live showcases over a week in early May 2003 for Atlantic Records, Columbia Records and Universal Records.

Blue October was then offered records deals by each company. Ultimately the band returned to Universal Republic Records in May 2003. History for Sale was then re-released on Universal Republic in August 2003. History for Sale was largely a response to the control Universal had placed on the group during the Consent to Treatment production process. This is evident in songs such as "Somebody" and "Inner Glow".

=== Foiled and commercial success (2006–2008) ===
"Calling You" remained the group's largest mainstream success until their 2006 single "Hate Me". The band made their network television premiere on April 14, 2006, performing "Hate Me", the first single from Foiled, on The Tonight Show with Jay Leno. They appeared on Jimmy Kimmel Live! on June 28, 2006. Blue October was also on Late Night with Conan O'Brien in 2006. On November 14, 2006, Blue October opened for the Rolling Stones in Boise, Idaho. "Hate Me" was released to Modern Rock radio stations and quickly climbed to number two on Billboard's Modern Rock Tracks chart. "Hate Me" remained in the Top 5 of the Modern Rock chart for 20 straight weeks. While in the number two chart position, "Hate Me" was jumped over twice by both Pearl Jam and the Red Hot Chili Peppers. "Hate Me" would never reach number one. The music video for "Hate Me" debuted on VH1, later making a splash at number 13 on VH1's user-controlled video countdown show VH1 Top 20 Video Countdown. It eventually peaked at number 2 for the week ending on May 5, 2006. "Into the Ocean", the second single from the album, was released on July 17, 2006. The music video for the song debuted at number three on VH1's The 20 during the show's final week of 2006, and reached the number one spot in mid-February 2007. "Into the Ocean" hit number 20 on the Modern Rock Tracks. The next single from the band was "She's My Ride Home", which they performed on Late Night with Conan O'Brien on April 25, 2007.

Blue October's fourth album, Foiled, was certified platinum on February 22, 2007. Foiled went on to sell 1.4 million albums in the US. Both "Hate Me" and "Into the Ocean" were also certified as platinum selling singles. This was heralded as a special moment for the band, Rainmaker, Brando and key executives at Universal Republic who had signed, dropped and then resigned the band.

As a result of reaching a new audience that Blue October has found with Foiled, Blue October underwent an expansion of its tour locations. Originally restricted to Texas, and parts of the Midwest and Southwest United States, Blue October began touring locations covering the entire continental United States. In addition, locations in Alaska, Hawaii, Canada, Mexico, England, France, Ireland, Scotland, Germany and the Netherlands were added to their schedule.

In August 2008, Justin was featured in a sold out four-city tour with Stephenie Meyer, author of the Twilight series. During this tour, Justin premiered two new songs, "Blue Skies" and "My Never", which would be included on the band's fifth studio album. Twilight author Stephenie Meyer is a fan of Blue October, and their music helped inspire part of the popular book series.

=== Approaching Normal and Ugly Side (2009–2010) ===
The band's fifth studio album, Approaching Normal, was released on March 24, 2009. It was distributed via its predecessors, Universal. Approaching Normal was produced by Steve Lillywhite (of U2, Peter Gabriel and Dave Matthews Band). The album debuted at number 13 on the Billboard 200 chart. The band released two versions of the album, each with a different bonus track: an "explicit" version, with "The End" as the bonus track, and a "clean" version, with "Graceful Dancing" as the bonus track. "Graceful Dancing" was also released in late 2008 as a "special gift" to fans signed under the band's email list.

"Dirt Room" was the first single from the album, released on December 23, 2008. "Dirt Room" became Blue October's second Top 5 Modern Rock single (fourth Top 40 Modern Rock hit) peaking at number 7 on April 8, 2009. "Say It" was released as the second single on April 24, 2009. "Say It" was Blue October's fifth Top 40 Modern Rock hit peaking at number 29 on July 24, 2009. "Say it" also crossed over to the Hot AC radio format giving the band its fourth Top 40 Hot AC hit peaking at number 28 on October 13, 2009. The song was first performed at Edgefest 17 on April 27, 2008, in Dallas, Texas.

In May 2009, Blue October's show in Pittsburgh was cancelled by the fire marshal and the Pittsburgh Police Department, due to overcrowding and unsafe conditions. Not wanting to disappoint fans, the band set up their gear on the corner outside the venue and played a mini-set to the delight of fans.

On October 22, 2009, Blue October announced that the rest of the tour had been canceled due to Justin Furstenfield suffering a severe mental anxiety attack. He returned to perform at Stubb's Outdoor Amphitheater in Texas a month or two after his attack. The tour was rescheduled in 2010.

In July 2010, Blue October played a series of acoustic concerts that were recorded for a live unplugged album, entitled Ugly Side: An Acoustic Evening with Blue October, released on May 10, 2011. In February 2011, the band announced on their website that they would embark on an acoustic tour between March and May 2011.

=== Any Man in America and Up/Down Records (2011–2012) ===
On June 1, 2010, the band announced they were beginning pre-production on their next studio album to be produced by Tim Palmer. In late 2010 and early 2011, they headed back to the studio to finish recording the album, which debuted on August 16, 2011. The title of the album is Any Man in America.

During the week of February 14–18, lead singer Furstenfeld did a stint as a guest DJ on Austin's KROX-FM radio station. Furstenfeld previewed four new tracks on the air, presumably on the new album, titled "The Chills", "The Waiting, "The Getting Over It Part" and "The Flight (Lincoln to Minneapolis)". On April 3, 2011, Furstenfeld announced the album would be distributed by RED Music, a Sony Music imprint for independent artists. Their former label, Universal Motown Records, offered them a 360 deal (which the band rejected). The band opted to become independent instead, and formed their own label called Up/Down Records. On May 4, 2011, Blue October played the first full song of the new album live, called "The Feel Again". On May 6, 2011, Blue October played a second song in St. Louis, Missouri from their upcoming album "The Follow Through". Furstenfeld performed a duet with Patricia Lynn from the band The Soldier Thread for the song.

The official music video for the first single, "The Chills", was released via the band's Vevo channel on July 25, 2011. Any Man in America was released in the US on August 16, 2011. The album debuted at number 8 on the Billboard Album Sales Chart on August 25, 2011. This was their first Top 10 album sales chart debut. On September 24, 2011, "The Chills" (the first single from Any Man in America) peaked at number 26 on the Billboard Modern Rock Chart, giving Blue October their sixth Top 40 Modern Rock radio hit.

=== Sway and Things We Do at Night (2013–2015) ===
By October 2012, Justin Furstenfeld had nearly completed writing the songs for Blue October's seventh album, Sway. He entered the studio with the band and producer David Castell (who also co-produced Foiled and produced History For Sale) at the beginning of 2013. The official release date was August 20, 2013. The band released the first single from the album in February 2013. "Light You Up" made its live debut on October 7, 2012, in Millvale, Pennsylvania. On Tuesday, December 18, the band released a new single called "The Scar", which is a Blue October rendition of a 5591 song.

Drummer Jeremy Furstenfeld announced on Twitter that the band started rehearsals for the new album on January 14, 2013. They ended rehearsals on January 30 and were prepared to enter the studio to start recording the album. On February 5, 2013, the band entered the studio to start recording the new album. Justin Furstenfeld divulged in an interview that the studio had been rented out to them for all of February and March. On his official Twitter account, Justin listed the songs being recorded for the new album, which include "Light You Up", "Still Broken", "Sway" (the title track) and "Sorry Hearts". The song "Still Broken" was originally released by The Last Wish on their 1995 album, The First of February, but ultimately did not make it onto the album. The song "Sorry Hearts" was released on an accompanying EP, Debris.

The band finished recording the new album on March 27, 2013. The first single, "Bleed Out", was released on June 17, 2013. Several songs were considered for the first single including "Bleed Out", "Angels in Everything", "Things We Do at Night", and "Light You Up". The album received positive critical acclaim, with Music Eyz citing "it's easy to see that our favourite tormented soul is on the mend and still creating some of the most powerful and emotional music out there." On August 10, 2013, they released a second single, "Angels in Everything", for international markets. The video for the song "Fear" was published on November 2, 2014, to the band's YouTube/Vevo channel.

On November 20, 2015, the live DVD/album Things We Do at Night (Live from Texas) was released.

=== Home and I Hope You're Happy (2016–2019) ===
On February 13, 2015, the band announced that they were starting work on their eighth studio album via their official Twitter feed. The band entered the recording studio in August 2015, and finished recording the album in early November. The band recorded eleven songs for the new album, making this their shortest album to date. An acoustic version of one of the songs, entitled "Home", was played live in Las Vegas on September 19. The album, also titled Home, was released April 22, 2016. The title track and first single "Home" made its radio premiere December 16, 2015. The official video for "Home" was premiered on Billboard on April 13, 2016. Tim Palmer, who worked on the albums Any Man in America and Sway, co-produced and mixed the album. The song "Home" reached the Top 30 of the US Adult Pop Songs chart.

Blue October released a new single called "I Hope You're Happy" on February 28, 2018. The band released its ninth studio album, also called I Hope You're Happy, on August 17, 2018.

=== This Is What I Live For and Get Back Up (2020–2022) ===
Blue October started 2020 with the release of a new single called "Oh My My" on February 28, exactly two years after the release of "I Hope You're Happy". The single is taken from the upcoming album This Is What I Live For. Justin Furstenfeld performed other songs off the album, such as "The Weatherman", "Fight For Love", and "Only Lost is Found", acoustically at his solo Open Book shows or for radio promotional appearances. Recorded in the winter of 2019–2020, the album was released on October 23, 2020.

The Blue October documentary, Get Back Up, was released worldwide on May 21, 2020. The band had planned to tour starting in March 2020, but the tour was postponed due to the COVID-19 pandemic. After playing a series of smaller outdoor acoustic shows in Texas during the summer of 2021, the This is What I Live For tour began in earnest in September 2021. In late September, Justin Furstenfeld and Matt Noveskey tested positive for COVID-19 and shows were cancelled for a week. After testing negative, the tour resumed on October 21. In March 2022, Blue October played shows in the UK, then returned to North America for a coast-to-coast summer amphitheater tour with the Goo Goo Dolls.

=== Spinning the Truth Around Part I & II (2022–2023) ===
In July 2022, Blue October released the single "Spinning the Truth Around" via Up/Down Records. The follow-up single "Where Did You Go? I'm Less of a Mess These Days" reached the Top 20 on the alternative rock chart. The band's eleventh and twelfth studio albums, Spinning the Truth Around Part I and Spinning the Truth Around Part II, were released a year apart on October 14, 2022, and October 13, 2023, respectively. The first single from Part II, "Down Here Waiting" made its radio debut in June 2023, and became the band's nineteenth song to reach the Top 40 (spending six months on the charts). Spinning the Truth Around Part III, an album featuring remixes and covers, was expected to be released in late 2024.

=== "Everything We Lost in the Fire", Happy Birthday and "Hot Stuff" (2024–2025) ===
In March 2024, Blue October released a new single, "Everything We Lost in the Fire" (with lyrics by Justin Furstenfeld and music by Matt Noveskey and Paco Estrada). The song broke into the Top 40 on both the iHeartRadio and Billboard Alternative Airplay charts, making it the band's twentieth Top 40 single. At the time of its release, press reported that the song was the title track to the band's forthcoming thirteenth studio album, with the caveat that the album title was tentative During the summer of 2024, Blue October embarked on a nationwide triple headliner tour with Switchfoot and Matt Nathanson, playing mostly outdoor venues and rotating the lineup order each night. Following the tour, Blue October took a break from touring until 2025. They plan to record their next album in 2025, as well as staging some special events to coincide with the band's 30th anniversary, and re-release of their back catalog.

In the summer of 2024, Justin Furstenfeld posted the cover artwork for a remix album on social media, confirming the album Spinning the Truth Around Part III being re-titled Happy Birthday. The album, which contains remixes from the band's previous five albums as well as two previously unreleased songs, was released to streaming services on Justin Furstenfeld's 49th birthday, December 14, 2024.

On March 31, 2025, Blue October's latest single, "Hot Stuff", was released. It debuted at number 33 on the iHeartRadio Alternative Top 40 chart, making it their 21st song to break into the Top 40. In the summer of 2025, Blue October played a tour to celebrate their 30th anniversary as a band, and released their first four albums on vinyl for the first time as a box set entitled The Collected Series. At the concerts, the main set featured only songs from the first four albums, and an encore of fan favorites and radio hits, including "Hot Stuff". For their autumn 2025 "We Didn't Die Young" tour, the set featured songs with a theme of perseverance through loss and other obstacles, and the band was joined by guitarist Will Knaak. "Hot Stuff" and "Everything We Lost in the Fire" were issued on physical media, as a limited edition 12" vinyl single that was only available for purchase at the concerts.

=== 20th anniversary of Foiled and tour (2026–present) ===
In 2026, for the 20th anniversary of their most successful album Foiled, Blue October released it on vinyl for the first time. The band also scheduled a tour into 2027 and will play every song from the album from start to finish. Prior to the tour, they released official music videos for "Congratulations", "18th Floor Balcony" and "She's My Ride Home" via their website and social media. In late 2026, they plan to release their long-awaited thirteenth studio album.

== Band members ==
Current

- Justin Furstenfeld – lead vocals, rhythm guitar (1995–present), lead guitar (1995–1999)
- Ryan Delahoussaye – violin, mandolin, mandocello, keyboard, guitar, backing vocals (1995–present)
- Jeremy Furstenfeld – drums, percussion, backing vocals (1995–present)
- Matt Noveskey – bass, backing vocals (1998–2002, 2004–present), guitar (2010)
- Will Knaak – lead guitar, backing vocals (2018–2022, 2025–2026)
- Steve Schiltz – lead guitar, bass, backing vocals (studio: 2010–present, live: 2023–2025)

Past

- Liz Mulally – bass, keyboard (1995–1998)
- Brant Coulter – lead guitar (1999–2000)
- Cole Bradshaw – lead guitar (2000)
- Dwayne Casey – bass (2002–2003)
- Piper Skih Dagnino – bass (2003–2004)
- Julian Mandrake – rhythm guitar (2006), lead guitar (2011–2013)
- C.B. Hudson – lead guitar (2000–2010, 2013–2016)
- Matthew "Feathers" Ostrander – lead guitar (2016–2018)
- Sus Vasquez – lead guitar (2022–2023)

Timeline

Member history

Blue October was started by Justin Furstenfeld and Ryan Delahoussaye, who met in high school. Prior to forming the full band, the duo played together under the name Harvest with Justin singing and playing guitar and Ryan playing mandolin and violin and singing backup. Ryan was working at a restaurant in Houston at the time, and invited restaurant patron Elizabeth "Liz" Rapstein Phillips (née Mulally) to join on bass after striking up a conversation upon noticing she had a drum tuning key on her key chain. Justin's older brother Jeremy was watching the group practice at Liz's house one day. Liz had a drum kit and Justin persuaded Jeremy to join in on drums, even though he had never played before. The band played their first show soon after Jeremy joined. Jeremy lived in San Marcos, and the other members (except Liz) moved to join him there in 1996. Liz was replaced by Matt Noveskey in late 1998. The band wanted to add a second guitar player to allow Justin to focus more on singing during shows, and auditioned guitarists in 1999. Brant Coulter was chosen as lead guitarist; however, he left the band in late 2000 when Blue October was dropped from Universal Records. Jeremy and Justin's cousin Cole Bradshaw filled in on lead guitar while the band searched for a permanent guitarist. C.B. Hudson joined on lead guitar in late 2000 after a chance meeting with Justin at a restaurant in San Marcos.

At the end of the Consent to Treatment tour in 2002, Matt Noveskey left the band for health reasons and was replaced by Dwayne Casey. Dwayne and Matt both played on the band's next album, History for Sale, and Dwayne toured with the band in 2003. In August 2003, Dwayne was replaced by Piper Skih Swinford (née Dagnino), who is married to one of Blue October's co-managers and is also an established professional bassist. Piper toured with the band through 2004 and appeared on the live album/DVD Argue With a Tree... During preparations for recording the band's next album, Foiled, Matt Novesky was called back in as the official bassist, thereby returning the band to their most recognizable lineup. This lineup recorded and toured the next two Blue October albums. At the end of the Approaching Normal tour, C.B. Hudson announced he was leaving the band to focus on raising a family and pursuing his dream of owning a recording studio. C.B. was replaced by former Canvas guitarist Julian Mandrake, who had previously been a touring guitarist for Blue October in 2006, covering Justin's guitar parts while Justin was recovering from a knee injury. Julian played with Blue October on their acoustic Ugly Side tour and also on the Any Man in America tour.

During the recording sessions for Sway in early 2013, C.B. Hudson was asked to come back and play on the album and to play shows over mid-2013, once again returning Blue October to their previous lineup. C.B. recorded with Blue October for their 2016 album Home and appeared in publicity photos with the band, but he had to take leave from the band due to a collarbone injury sustained during a dirt bike accident and Matthew Ostrander played lead guitar in 2016–2017 for the Home tour. On April 13, 2016, it was confirmed that C.B. would not be returning. On January 24, 2018, Matthew Ostrander posted a video on Instagram announcing he had informed the band ten days prior that he was stepping down. Although he no longer tours with Blue October, Matthew Ostrander continues to contribute guitar and songwriting to the band's albums. In February 2018, Will Knaak was announced as the new lead guitarist. On August 24, 2022, Justin Furstenfeld posted on instagram announcing Will Knaak would be departing Blue October to be a guitarist in Parker McCollum's band. Initially, Will planned to leave after the Summer 2022 tour opening for the Goo Goo Dolls, however on October 5, 2022, the band announced that Knaak would continue to tour with Blue October through the end of 2022, at which point he will permanently depart. Knaak's replacement, Sus Vasquez, began recording in the studio with Blue October in October 2022, and first joined the band on stage in February 2023. Guitarist Steve Schiltz of Longwave, a longtime tour-mate and studio collaborator of Blue October's, joined the band as lead guitarist for select dates in March 2023, and played with the band on their autumn 2023 tour. Justin Furstenfeld announced ahead of that tour that Steve Schiltz is now an official full member of the band. During the autumn of 2025, Will Knaak rejoined Blue October for their "We Didn't Die Young" tour.

== Discography ==
Studio albums

- The Answers (1998)
- Consent to Treatment (2000)
- History for Sale (2003)
- Foiled (2006)
- Approaching Normal (2009)
- Any Man in America (2011)
- Sway (2013)
- Home (2016)
- I Hope You're Happy (2018)
- This Is What I Live For (2020)
- Spinning the Truth Around (Part 1) (2022)
- Spinning the Truth Around (Part 2) (2023)
- Happy Birthday (2024)
