= Grammy Award for Best Rock Instrumental Performance =

Honor presented to recording artists for quality rock instrumental performances

- Awarded for: Quality instrumental rock performances
- Country: United States
- Presented by: National Academy of Recording Arts and Sciences
- First award: 1980
- Final award: 2011
- Currently held by: Jeff Beck, "Hammerhead" (2011)
- Website: grammy.com

The Grammy Award for Best Rock Instrumental Performance was an honor presented to recording artists for quality instrumental rock performances at the Grammy Awards, a ceremony that was established in 1958, and ended after the 2011 award, and originally called the Gramophone Awards. Honors in several categories are presented at the ceremony annually by the National Academy of Recording Arts and Sciences of the United States to "honor artistic achievement, technical proficiency and overall excellence in the recording industry, without regard to album sales or chart position".

The award was first presented at the 1980 Grammy Awards to Paul McCartney and Wings for "Rockestra Theme". From 1986 to 1989, the category was known as Best Rock Instrumental Performance (Orchestra, Group or Soloist). According to the category description guide for the 2010 awards, the award is presented to artists "for newly recorded rock, hard rock or metal instrumental performances".

Jeff Beck holds the records for the most wins, with six. Sting has received three awards, twice as a member of The Police—although he had no part in the band's "Behind My Camel", the 1982 award winner which he did not write and on which he refused to play.

Two-time recipients include Eric Clapton, Carlos Santana (once as a member of the band Santana), The Flaming Lips, Steve Vai, and brothers Jimmie Vaughan and Stevie Ray Vaughan (each once as part of the duo Vaughan Brothers). At the 2009 awards, the tribute act Zappa Plays Zappa (led by Dweezil Zappa, son of Frank Zappa) earned an award for their performance of Frank's instrumental song "Peaches en Regalia". Dweezil and Frank have both received multiple nominations and even competed against one another in 1988. Joe Satriani holds the record for the most nominations (as well as the record for the most nominations without a win), with fourteen.

The award was discontinued before the 2012 awards due to a major overhaul of Grammy categories. All instrumental performances in the rock category were shifted to either the newly formed Best Rock Performance or Best Hard Rock/Metal Performance categories.

== Recipients ==
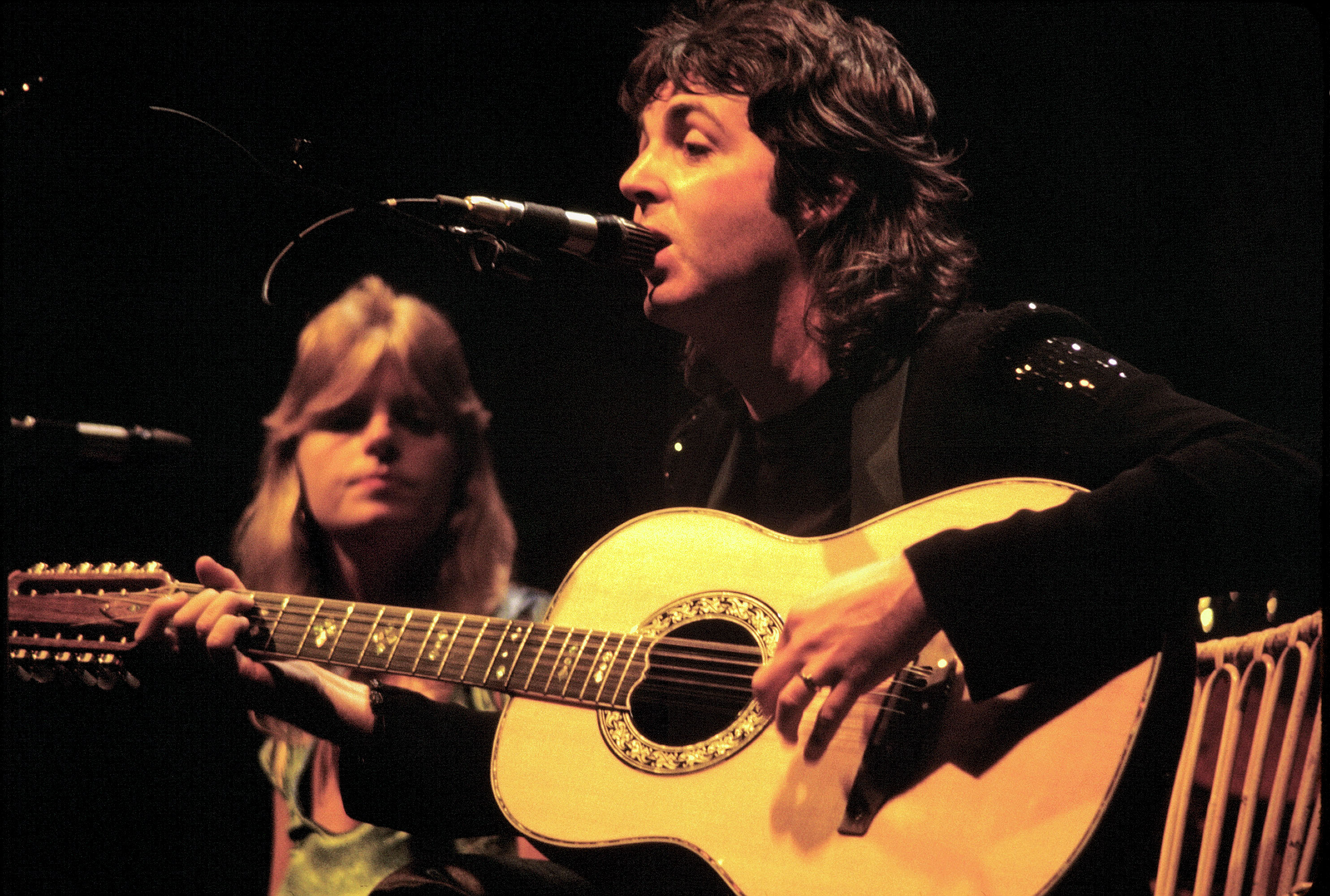
Paul McCartney with fellow Wings member Linda McCartney in 1976

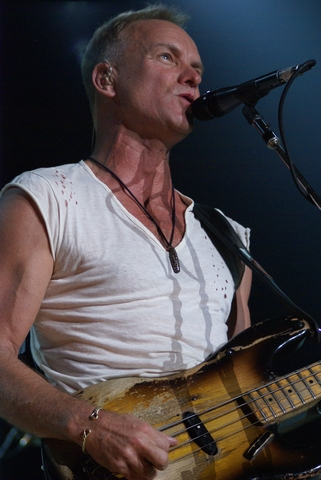
Three-time award recipient Sting (twice as a member of The Police) performing in 2007

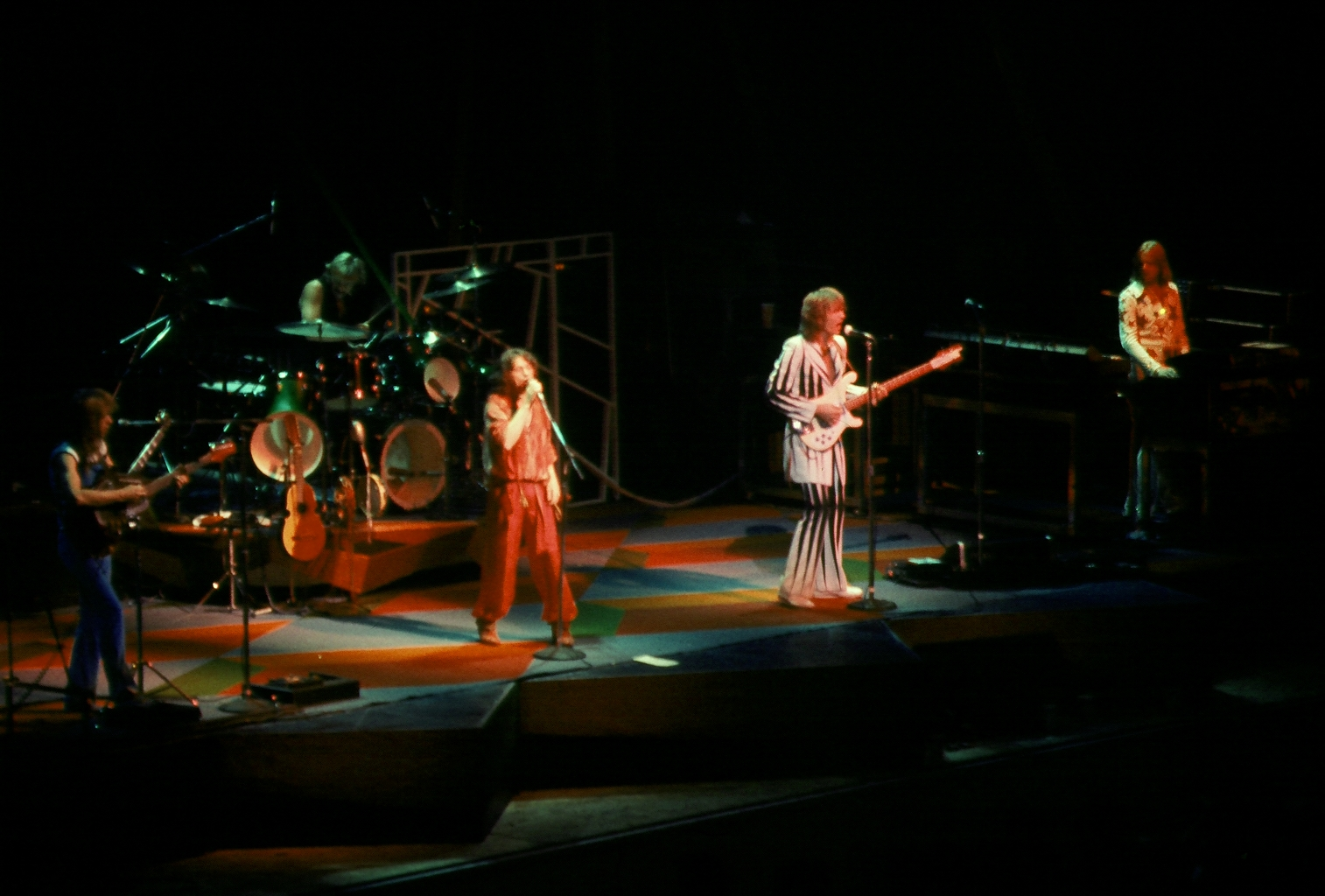
Members of the 1985 award-winning band Yes performing in 1977

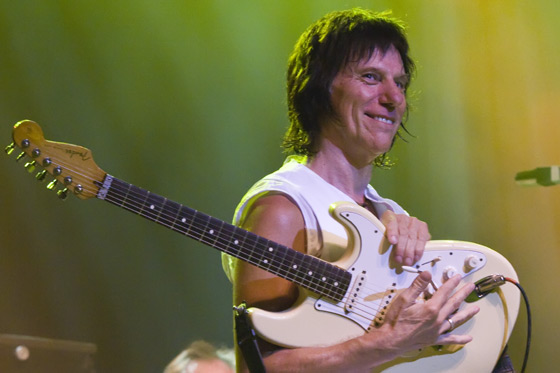
Six-time award winner Jeff Beck performing in Sydney, Australia in 2009

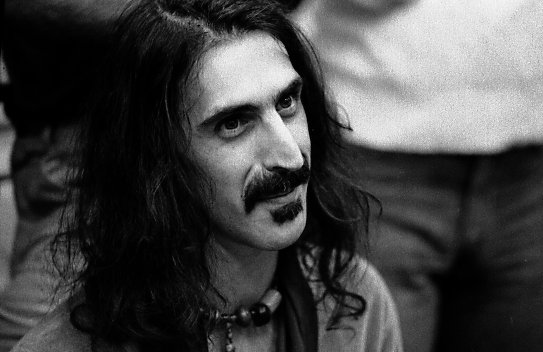
1988 award recipient Frank Zappa in 1977

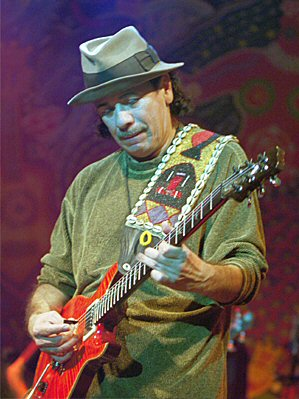
Two-time award winner Carlos Santana (once as the leader of the band Santana) performing in 2000

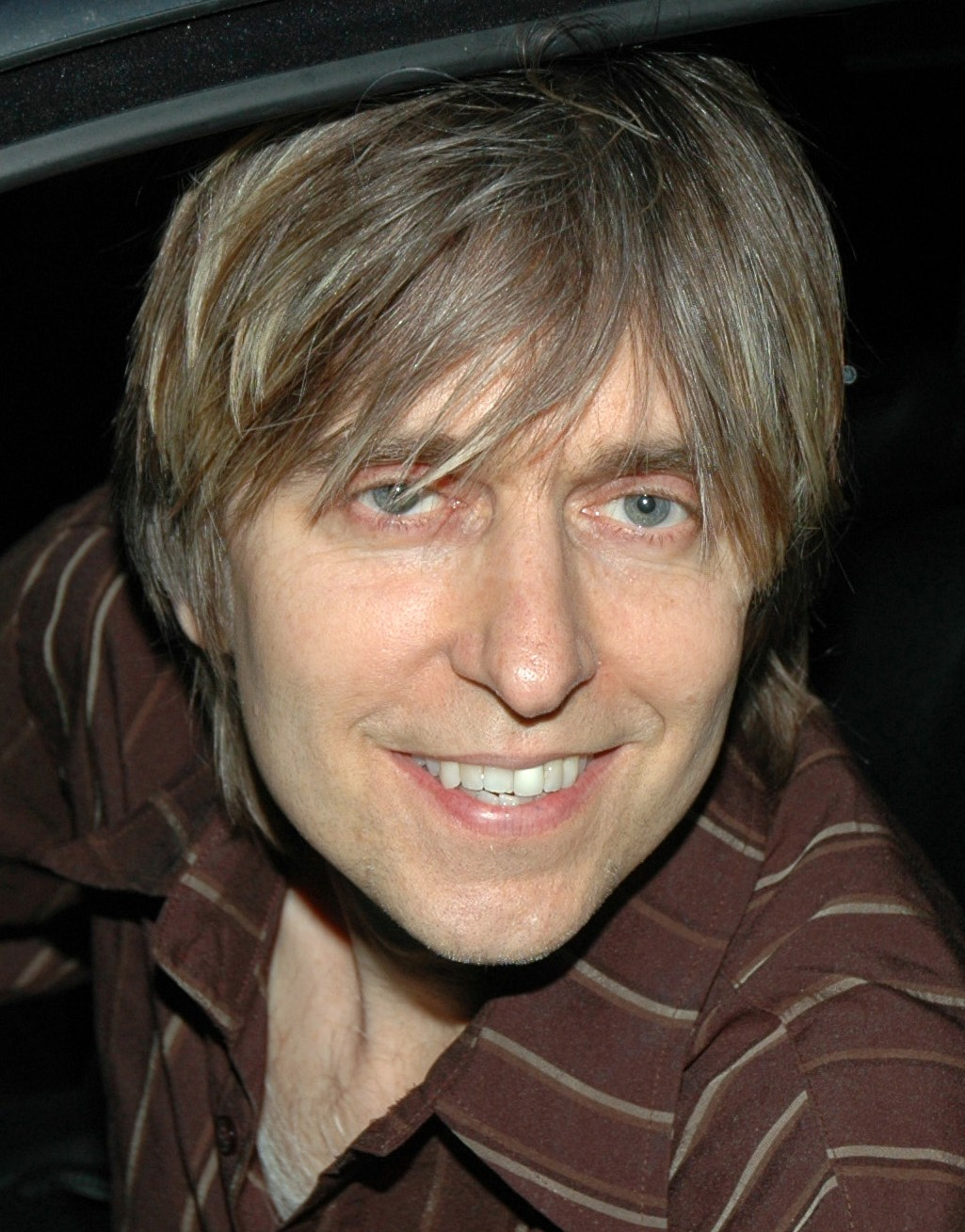
Eric Johnson, 1992 award winner, in 2007

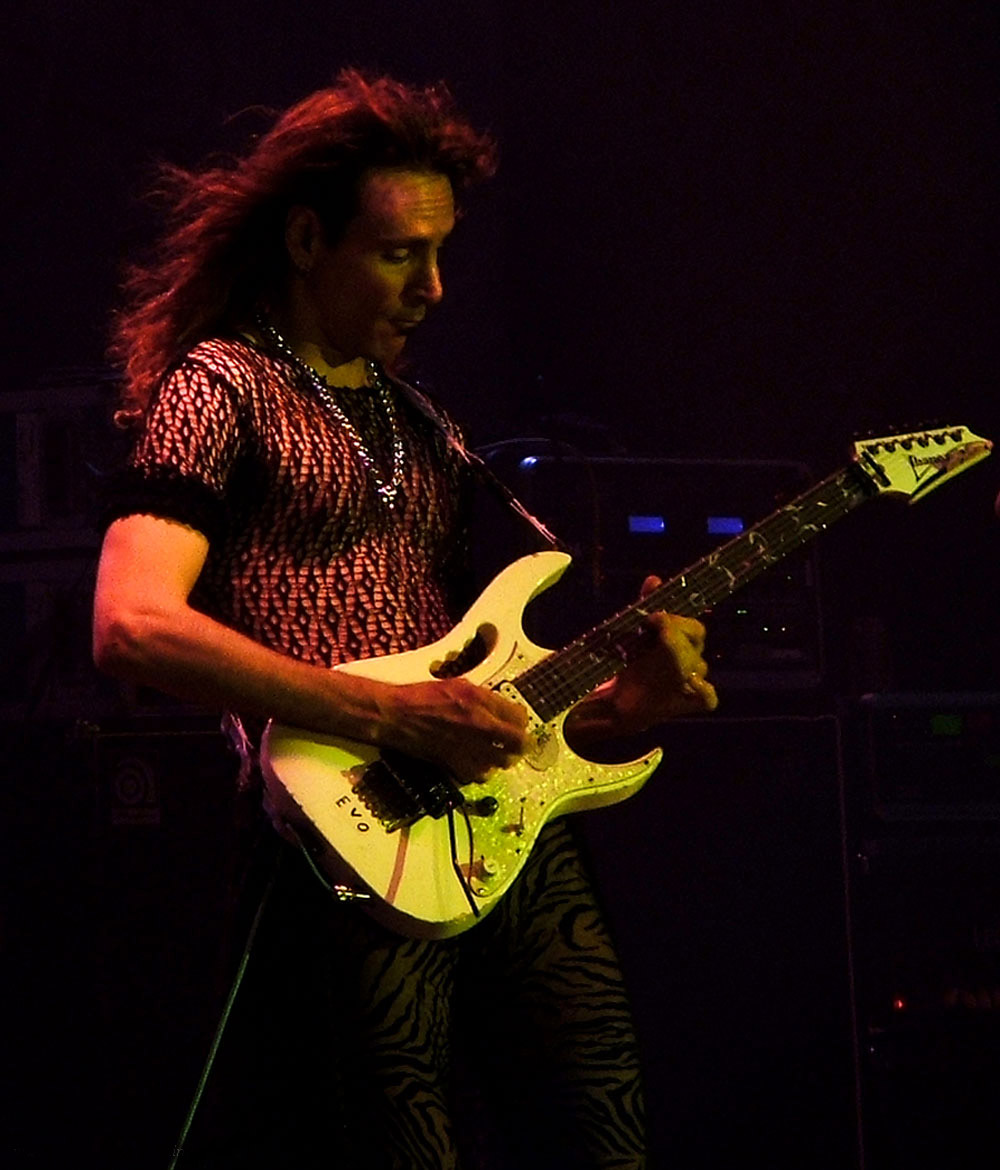
Two-time award winner Steve Vai in 2005

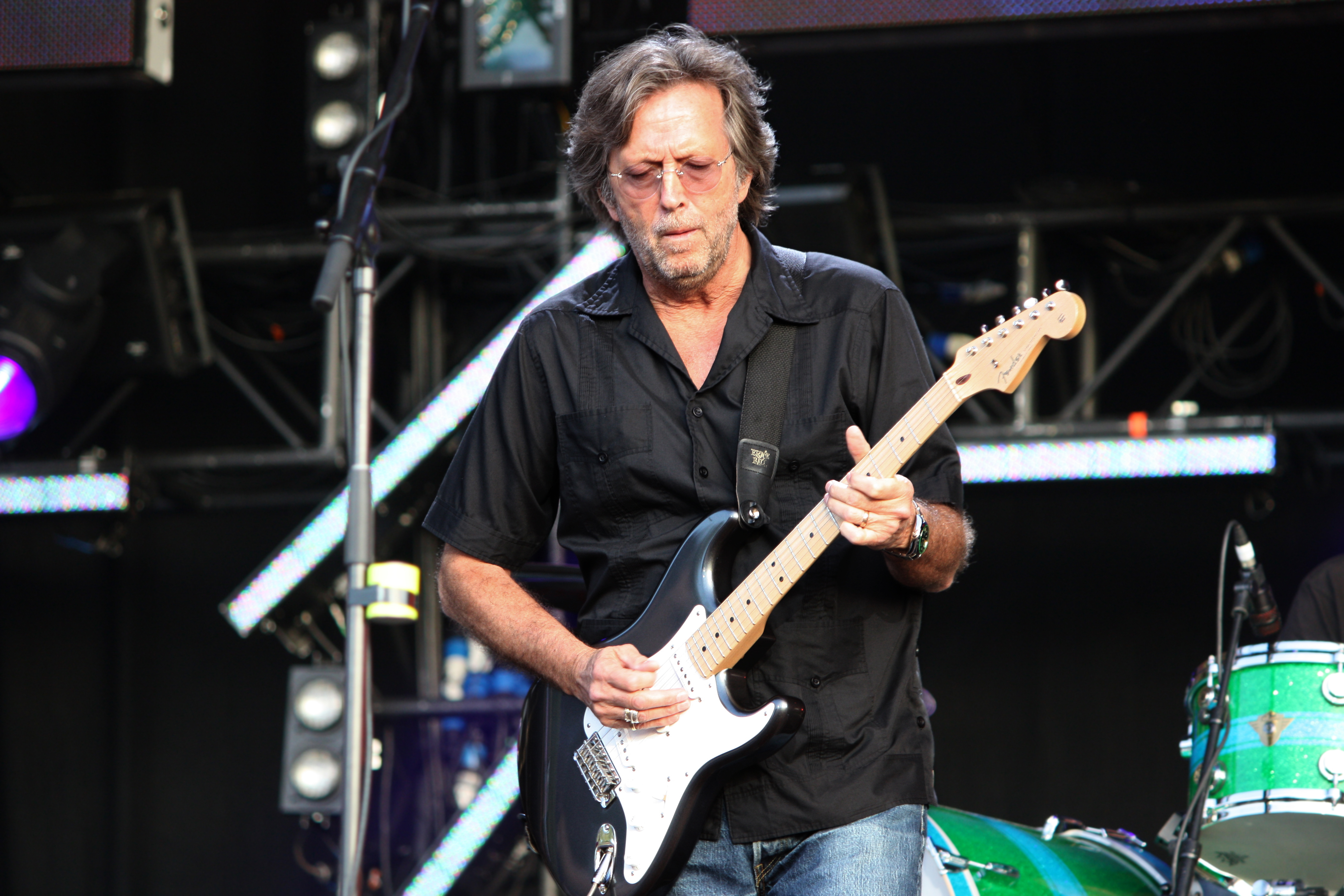
Two-time award recipient Eric Clapton performing in 2008

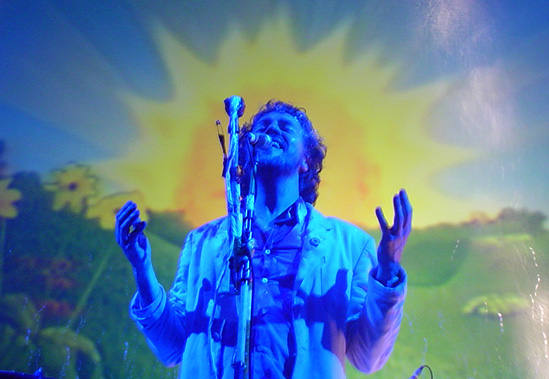
Wayne Coyne of the two-time award-winning band The Flaming Lips performing in 2004

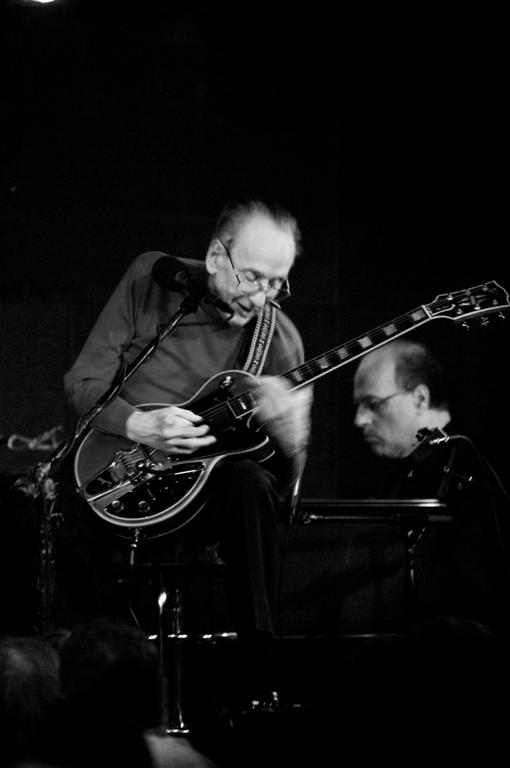
2006 award winner Les Paul in 2008

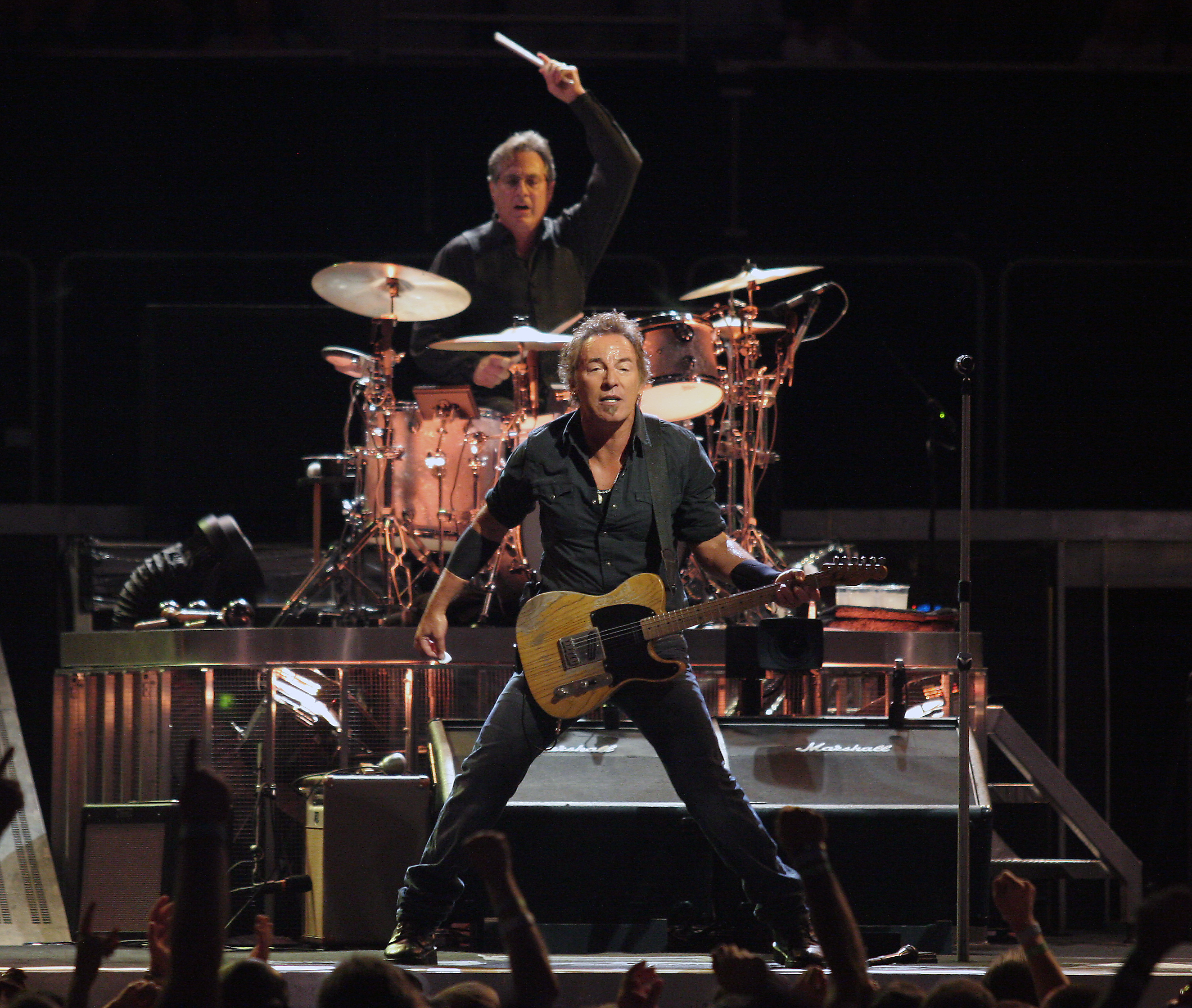
2008 award winner Bruce Springsteen performing in 2008

Year^{[I]}	Performing artist(s)	Work	Nominees	Ref.
1980	Wings	"Rockestra Theme"	The Allman Brothers Band – "Pegasus"; Dixie Dregs – Night of the Living Dregs; Neil Larsen – "High Gear"; Frank Zappa – "Rat Tomago"	
1981	The Police	"Reggatta de Blanc"	Dixie Dregs – Dregs of the Earth; Emerson, Lake & Palmer – "Peter Gunn"; Jean-Luc Ponty – "Beach Girl"; The Pretenders – "Space Invader"	
1982	The Police	"Behind My Camel"	Dixie Dregs – Unsung Heroes; Robert Fripp – The League of Gentlemen; Kraftwerk – "Computer World"; Rush – "YYZ"	
1983	A Flock of Seagulls	"D.N.A."	Dixie Dregs – Industry Standard; Maynard Ferguson – "Don't Stop 'til You Get Enough"; King Crimson – "Requiem"; Van Morrison – "Scandinavia"	
1984	Sting	"Brimstone & Treacle"	Allan Holdsworth – Road Games; Rainbow – "Anybody There"; Pete Townshend – "Unused Piano: 'Quadrophenia'"; Stevie Ray Vaughan & Double Trouble – "Rude Mood"	
1985	Yes	"Cinema"	Genesis – "Second Home by the Sea"; Lionel Hampton – "Vibramatic"; Edward Van Halen – "Donut City"; Stevie Ray Vaughan & Double Trouble – "Voodoo Child (Slight Return)"	
1986	Jeff Beck	"Escape"	Big Guitars from Texas – "Guitar Army"; The Jon Butcher Axis – "The Ritual"; Yngwie Malmsteen – Rising Force; Northern Star – "Back to Earth"; Stevie Ray Vaughan & Double Trouble – "Say What!"	
1987	Art of Noise featuring Duane Eddy	"Peter Gunn"	The Fabulous Thunderbirds – "Down at Antone's"; Eric Johnson – "Zap"; The Alan Parsons Project – "Where's the Walrus?"; Yes – "Amazing Grace"	
1988	Frank Zappa	Jazz from Hell	Herbie Hancock with Dweezil Zappa & Terry Bozzio – "Wipe Out"; Bruce Springsteen & the E Street Band – "Paradise by the 'C'"; Stevie Ray Vaughan & Dick Dale – "Pipeline"; Stevie Ray Vaughan & Double Trouble - "Say What!"	
1989	Carlos Santana	Blues for Salvador	The Jeff Healey Band – "Hide Away"; Jimmy Page – "Writes of Winter"; Joe Satriani – Surfing with the Alien; Frank Zappa – Guitar	
1990	Jeff Beck	Jeff Beck's Guitar Shop	Steve Morse – High Tension Wires; Joe Satriani – "The Crush of Love"; Andy Summers – "A Piece of Time"; Stevie Ray Vaughan & Double Trouble – "Travis Walk"	
1991	Jimmie Vaughan & Stevie Ray Vaughan	"D/FW"	The Allman Brothers Band – "True Gravity"; Eric Johnson – Ah Via Musicom; Joe Satriani – Flying in a Blue Dream; Steve Vai – Passion and Warfare	
1992	Eric Johnson	"Cliffs of Dover"	The Allman Brothers Band – "Kind of Bird"; Danny Gatton – 88 Elmira St.; Rush – "Where's My Thing?"; Yes – "Masquerade"	
1993	Stevie Ray Vaughan & Double Trouble	"Little Wing"	Jeff Beck & Jed Leiber – "Hound Dog"; Dixie Dregs – Bring 'Em Back Alive; Santana – "Gypsy/Grajonca"; Joe Satriani – The Extremist	
1994	Steve Vai	"Sofa"	Aerosmith – "Boogie Man"; Jeff Beck & Jed Leiber – "Hi-Heel Sneakers"; Joe Satriani – "Speed of Light"; Tangerine Dream – "Purple Haze"	
1995	Pink Floyd	"Marooned"	Dixie Dregs – "Shapes of Things"; Rush – "Leave That Thing Alone"; Carlos Santana, Jorge Santana & Carlos Hernandez – "Luz Amore y Vida"; Joe Satriani – "All Alone"	
1996	The Allman Brothers Band	"Jessica"	The Jeff Healey Band – "Shapes of Things"; King Crimson – "Vrooom"; Santana with Vernon Reid – "Every Now and Then"; Steve Vai – "Tender Surrender"	
1997	Jimmie Vaughan, Eric Clapton, Bonnie Raitt, Robert Cray, B.B. King, Buddy Guy, Dr. John & Art Neville	"SRV Shuffle"	Booker T. & the M.G.'s – "Green Onions"; Eric Johnson – "Pavilion"; Joe Satriani – "(You're) My World"; Edward Van Halen & Alex Van Halen – "Respect the Wind"	
1998	The Chemical Brothers	"Block Rockin' Beats"	Robben Ford – "In the Beginning"; Eric Johnson – "S.R.V."; Joe Satriani – "Summer Song"; Steve Vai – "For the Love of God"	
1999	Pat Metheny Group	"The Roots of Coincidence"	Everclear – "El Distorto de Melodica"; Propellerheads – "Take California"; Joe Satriani – "A Train of Angels"; Kenny Wayne Shepherd Band – "Trouble Is..."; Jimmie Vaughan – "The Ironic Twist"	
2000	Santana featuring Eric Clapton	"The Calling"	Jeff Beck – "What Mama Said"; Green Day – "Espionage"; Moby – "Bodyrock"; Steve Vai – "Windows to the Soul"	
2001	Metallica with the San Francisco Symphony	"The Call of Ktulu"	Peter Frampton – "Off the Hook"; Phish – "First Tube"; Joe Satriani – "Until We Say Goodbye"; Kenny Wayne Shepherd Band – "Electric Lullaby"	
2002	Jeff Beck	"Dirty Mind"	The Allman Brothers Band – "High Falls"; Godsmack – "Vampires"; Joe Satriani – "Always with Me, Always with You"; Steve Vai – "Whispering a Prayer"	
2003	The Flaming Lips	"Approaching Pavonis Mons by Balloon (Utopia Planitia)"	Gov't Mule – "Sco-Mule"; Tony Levin – "Apollo"; Joe Satriani – "Starry Night"; Slash – "Love Theme from The Godfather"	
2004	Jeff Beck	"Plan B"	The Allman Brothers Band – "Instrumental Illness"; Linkin Park – "Session"; Robert Randolph & the Family Band – "Squeeze"; Steve Vai – "Essence"	
2005	Brian Wilson	"Mrs. O'Leary's Cow"	The Allman Brothers Band – "Instrumental Illness"; Los Lonely Boys – "Onda"; Rush – "O Baterista"; Steve Vai – "Whispering a Prayer"	
2006	Les Paul & Friends	"69 Freedom Special"	Adrian Belew – "Beat Box Guitar"; Stewart Copeland – "Birds of Prey"; Joe Perry – "Mercy"; Steve Vai – "Lotus Feet"	
2007	The Flaming Lips	"The Wizard Turns On..."	Arctic Monkeys – "Chun-Li's Spinning Bird Kick"; Peter Frampton – "Black Hole Sun"; David Gilmour – "Castellorizon"; Joe Satriani – "Super Colossal"	
2008	Bruce Springsteen	"Once Upon a Time in the West"	Metallica – "The Ecstasy of Gold"; Rush – "Malignant Narcissism"; Joe Satriani – "Always with Me, Always with You"; Steve Vai – "The Attitude Song"	
2009	Zappa Plays Zappa featuring Steve Vai & Napoleon Murphy Brock	"Peaches en Regalia"	David Gilmour – "Castellorizon"; Metallica – "Suicide & Redemption"; Nine Inch Nails – "34 Ghosts I–IV"; Rush – "Hope (Live for The Art of Peace)"	
2010	Jeff Beck	"A Day in the Life"	Booker T. Jones – "Warped Sister"; Brad Paisley – "Playing with Fire"; The Brian Setzer Orchestra – "Mr. Surfer Goes Jazzin'"; Steve Vai – "Now We Run"	
2011	Jeff Beck	"Hammerhead"	The Black Keys - "Black Mud"; Los Lobos – "Do the Murray"; Dave Matthews & Tim Reynolds – "Kundalini Bonfire"; Dweezil Zappa – "The Deathless Horsie"	

^{^[I]} Each year is linked to the article about the Grammy Awards held that year.

== See also ==
- List of Grammy Award categories
- List of instrumental bands
- List of rock instrumentals
