= Rudess/Morgenstein Project =

Studio album by Rudess/Morgenstein Project
- Released: September 2, 1997
- Genre: Progressive rock, fusion, Dork rock
- Length: 50:40
- Label: Domo Records
- Producer: Rod Morgenstein & Jordan Rudess

Rudess/Morgenstein Project chronology
Rudess/Morgenstein Project (1997)	The Official Bootleg (2001)

Professional ratings
Review scores
Source	Rating
Allmusic	4/5 stars

Rudess/Morgenstein Project is an album by Jordan Rudess and Rod Morgenstein. It came about after a power outage during a Dixie Dregs concert caused all of the Dregs' instruments to fail except Jordan's, so he and Rod improvised until power was restored and the concert could continue. The chemistry between them was so strong that they decided to make their own album and subsequent tour. An Official Bootleg is also available. The album also features an uncredited performance by Kip Winger at the end of the track Masada.

== Track listing ==
All pieces are composed by Jordan Rudess and Rod Morgenstein.

1. "Don't Look Down" – 7:23
2. "Sloth" – 3:34
3. "Drop the Puck" – 3:50
4. "Crossing Over" – 7:35
5. "Never Again (For Nan)" – 3:46
6. "Tailspin" – 3:06
7. "Odd Man Out" – 3:43
8. "Masada" – 7:11
9. "Cartoon Parade" – 4:12
10. "Over the Edge" – 6:20

== Personnel ==
- Jordan Rudess - keyboards
- Rod Morgenstein - drums

== Production ==
- Arranged & Produced By Jordan Rudess & Rod Morgenstein
- Recorded & Engineered By Kip Winger
- Mixed By John Guth, Kosaku Nakamura & Kip Winger
- Mastered By John Guth
