= Full Circle (Dixie Dregs album) =

Album by Dixie Dregs

Studio album by Dixie Dregs
- Released: June 7, 1994
- Length: 39:43
- Label: Capricorn
- Producer: Steve Morse

Dixie Dregs chronology
Off the Record (1988)	Full Circle (1994)

Professional ratings
Review scores
Source	Rating
AllMusic	3/5 stars

Full Circle is the seventh studio album by the Dixie Dregs, released in 1994. This was their first studio album in over a decade, since 1982's Industry Standard, and the first album released under The Dixie Dregs since 1980's Dregs of the Earth, whereas Unsung Heroes and Industry Standard were released under the moniker The Dregs. It includes an instrumental cover of The Yardbirds song, "Shapes of Things". Although the Dixie Dregs have continued to be active in the years after its release, Full Circle is the last studio album by the band as of 2025.

== Track listing ==
All songs written by Steve Morse except where noted:

No.	Title	Writer(s)	Length
1.	"Aftershock"		3:45
2.	"Perpetual Reality"		5:33
3.	"Calcutta"		5:28
4.	"Goin' to Town"		3:39
5.	"Pompous Circumstances"		3:22
6.	"Shapes of Things"	Jim McCarty, Keith Relf, Paul Samwell-Smith	3:47
7.	"Sleeveless in Seattle"		4:06
8.	"Good Intentions"		4:00
9.	"Yeolde"		2:18
10.	"Ionized"		4:00
Total length:			39:43

== Musicians ==
- Steve Morse - guitar
- Dave LaRue - bass guitar
- T Lavitz - keyboards
- Rod Morgenstein - drums, percussion
- Jerry Goodman - violin

== Production ==
- Michael Fuller - Mastering
- Nigel Walker - Engineer, mixing
- Tom Morris - Engineer, mastering, mixing
- Kimberlin Brown - Art direction
- Lesley Bohm - Photography
- Marcia Beverley - Art direction
