= Fender Lead Series =

Electric guitar

Fender Lead I
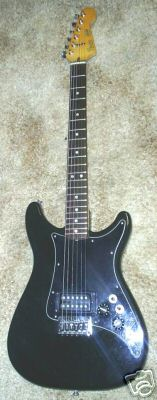
- Manufacturer: Fender
- Period: 1979–1982; 2020

Construction
- Body type: Solid
- Neck joint: Bolt-on

Woods
- Body: Ash or Alder
- Neck: Maple
- Fretboard: Rosewood, Pau Ferro or Maple

Hardware
- Bridge: Hardtail, strings through body
- Pickup(s): Variable, see models

Colors available
- 1979–1981: Black, Wine Red Transparent. 1981–1982: Black, Arctic White, Cherry Sunburst, Sienna Sunburst. Player Lead Series 2020: Lead II: Neon Green, Crimson Red Transparent, Black, Lead III: Purple Metallic, Sienna Sunburst, Olympic White

The Fender Lead Series was produced by the Fender/Rogers/Rhodes Division of CBS Musical Instruments. The series comprised Lead I, Lead II, and Lead III models.

== General features ==
- Manufactured Fall 1979 through 1982.
- Vintage style "Soft C" profile neck with a 7 1/4 in (184 mm) radius.
- Neck width at nut 1.60 in (40.64 mm), plus applied finish thickness on 1981 models.
- Truss rod adjustment at the heel of the neck.
- 2 vintage style string trees.
- 21 medium frets.
- "F" tuners (West German-manufactured), and "F" 4 bolt neck plate w/plastic pad.
- 3 Ply BWB through 1981 and WBW through 1982 pickguard with foil backing.
- White plastic nut.
- 25.5 in (65 cm) scale length.
- Bridge uses a string spacing of 0.404 in (10.26 mm).
- Hardtail through-body mounted strings.
- The saddle screws used lock nuts, not springs.
- Comes with a tolex or moulded plastic case.

== History ==
The original concept for the Lead guitar series, including the name "Lead" came from Dennis Handa, then Marketing director for Fender Guitars. The idea was to have a guitar that was cheaper than the Stratocaster and be attractive to players because of the neck feel as well as the pickup options. The smaller headstock and the neck were both patterned after earlier Fender necks. Originally Steve Morse of the Dixie Dregs was the first endorser of the guitar and premiered it at the NAMM International Music & Sound Expo in Atlanta, Georgia. The Lead Guitars were manufactured between 1979 and 1982 by the Fender Musical Equipment Co. under the direction of Gregg Wilson and Freddie Tavares. Gregg Wilson was succeeded by John Page, who eventually headed the Fender Custom Shop. The Lead Series have elements of the Stratocaster and Telecaster in their design with a body that is slightly smaller and with a slightly different shape than the Stratocaster, a Stratocaster-like neck (and headstock), and hardtail bridge with Telecaster-like string ferrules on the back of the body.

The Lead Series headstock was smaller than that of the then Stratocaster models and similar though not identical to the 1954 Stratocaster design. The Stratocaster models at the time of the Lead Series release in late 1979 were still using the larger headstock design until the introduction of the Dan Smith Stratocaster in 1981. At some point during 1982 the lower bout of the headstock was shifted towards the body giving the headstock a more elongated look.

The Lead Series were manufactured at Fender's Fullerton, California plant and priced below the Stratocaster models of the time (approx. $495.00). They were eventually replaced in Fender's line up by the Squier JV model in 1982 as Fender expanded its operations by starting Fender Japan.

In January 2020 Fender reintroduced the Lead II and III as a part of their Player series. These Made in Mexico recreations sport an alder body, two slanted alnico V single coils (Lead II), alnico II humbuckers (Lead III) and a modern C-shaped maple neck with maple or pau ferro fretboard, 9.5” radius, 22 medium jumbo frets. Other features include a synthetic bone nut, "F" tuners and a string-through-body bridge with block saddles.

== Notable users ==
Notable guitar players who have utilized the Fender Lead series include:

- Martin Bramah of The Fall played upside down licks on an upside down Lead II.
- Bono of U2 (used during the War Tour in 1983; can be seen playing a black model in the Live at Red Rocks: Under a Blood Red Sky video)
- Eric Clapton
- Elliot Easton of The Cars ("Touch and Go" guitar solo from the Panorama album)
- Roger Miller of Mission of Burma
- Steve Morse of the Dixie Dregs and Deep Purple ("Punk Sandwich" track from the album Night of the Living Dregs by the Dixie Dregs)
- Moon Martin's Street Fever sleeve shows a Lead I
- A. Savage of Parquet Courts
- Zé Pedro of Xutos & Pontapés
- Annie Clark of St Vincent
- Hélder Dias of Flama and Canalha
- Pablo Mondello of Massacre Palestina
- HeWhoCannotBeNamed of The Dwarves
- Pat Place of Bush Tetras
- Chris Boerner of The Hot at Nights and Hiss Golden Messenger
- Greg "Bonzo" Bonsignore Alien Love
- Matty Dill of Anniversary Effect
- Claudio Narea of Los Prisioneros
- Lynn Gunn of PVRIS (in the official music video for the song “My Way”)
- Greg Koch
- Roger Moreira of Ultraje a Rigor
- Michał "Bonk" Chęć - guitarist in polish funk band Łąki Łan.

== Models ==
- Lead I, 1979–1982: A single bridge-position split humbucker. Three-position coil selector switch (single coil, both coils, single coil), two-position humbucker series/parallel select switch which operates only when both coils are selected (middle position). Master volume and tone controls.
- Lead II, 1979–1982: Two X-1 single coil pickups, one at the neck, and the other at the bridge. The X-1 pickup was also used in the bridge position on the "STRAT" and the "Dan Smith Stratocaster" models. Three-position pickup selector switch (neck, neck and bridge, bridge), two-position phase shift switch (in phase, out of phase) which operates only when both pickups are selected (middle position). Master volume and tone controls.
- Lead III, 1982: Two humbuckers, one at the neck, the other at the bridge. Three-position pickup selector switch (neck, neck and bridge, bridge), three-position coil selector switch (neck single-coil, both coils neck or bridge, bridge single-coil) which determines if a single coil or both coils of each pickup will be selected. Master volume and tone controls.
- Lead Bass: This instrument never went into production. A photo of a 1979 prototype appears in Klaus Blasquiz's 1990 book The Fender Bass, features two slanted single-coil pickups, and has a 34” scale.
