= Southern Steel =

Southern Steel may refer to:

- Southern Steel (netball), a New Zealand netball team
- Southern Steel (album), a 1991 album by Steve Morse
- Southern Steel (novel), a 1953 novel by Dymphna Cusack
