= Night of the Living Dregs =

Studio album with live elements by Dixie Dregs
- Released: March 1979
- Recorded: 1978
- Length: 35:10
- Label: Capricorn
- Producer: Ken Scott

Dixie Dregs chronology
What If (1978)	Night of the Living Dregs (1979)	Dregs of the Earth (1980)

Professional ratings
Review scores
Source	Rating
AllMusic	4/5 stars
MusicHound Rock: The Essential Album Guide	3.5/5 stars
The Rolling Stone Jazz Record Guide	3/5 stars

Night of the Living Dregs is the third album by Dixie Dregs, released in 1979. The first half of the album was recorded in the studio, and the second half at the Montreux Jazz Festival on July 23, 1978.

The album received a Grammy Award nomination for Best Rock Instrumental Performance.

"Country House Shuffle" and "Leprechaun Promenade" were previously released on the band's 1976 demo record The Great Spectacular.

The first four tracks are studio recordings, while the second four were recorded live at the Montreux Jazz Festival.

== Track listing ==
All tracks are written by Steve Morse except where stated.

Side A
No.	Title	Length
1.	"Punk Sandwich"	3:18
2.	"Country House Shuffle"	4:13
3.	"The Riff Raff"	3:17
4.	"Long Slow Distance"	6:45

Side B
No.	Title	Writer(s)	Length
5.	"Night of the Living Dregs"		4:21
6.	"The Bash"	Morse, Morgenstein, Parrish, Sloan, West	4:28
7.	"Leprechaun Promenade"		3:46
8.	"Patchwork"		4:53

== Personnel ==
- Steve Morse – guitars
- Andy West – bass
- Allen Sloan – strings
- Mark Parrish – keyboards
- Rod Morgenstein – percussion
