= The Introduction (album) =

Studio album by Steve Morse
- Released: 1984
- Recorded: Morrisound Studio in Tampa, Florida; Eddy Offord Studio in Atlanta, Georgia
- Genre: Instrumental rock
- Length: 33:52
- Label: Elektra/Musician
- Producer: Steve Morse

Steve Morse chronology
| The Introduction (1984) | Stand Up (1985) |

Professional ratings
Review scores
| Source | Rating |
|---|---|
| AllMusic | 4.5/5 stars |

The Introduction is the first studio album by the guitarist Steve Morse, released in 1984 by Elektra/Musician. It reached No. 101 on the U.S. Billboard 200 and No. 15 on Billboard's Jazz Albums chart.

== Track listing ==
All music is composed by Steve Morse.

| No. | Title | Length |
|---|---|---|
| 1. | "Cruise Missile" | 5:35 |
| 2. | "General Lee" | 3:19 |
| 3. | "The Introduction" | 2:54 |
| 4. | "V.H.F. (Vertical Hair Factor)" | 4:18 |
| 5. | "On the Pipe" | 4:49 |
| 6. | "The Whistle" | 2:17 |
| 7. | "Mountain Waltz" | 4:28 |
| 8. | "Huron River Blues": "a) Dark Water"; "b) Water Under the Bridge"; "c) Toxic Shuffle" | 6:12 |
| Total length: | | 33:52 |

== Personnel ==
- Steve Morse – guitar, synthesizer (except track 6), organ, production
- Jerry Peek – bass
- Rod Morgenstein – drums, synthesizer (track 6)
- Albert Lee – guitar (track 2)
- T Lavitz – piano (track 7)
- Chuck Allen – engineering, mixing
- Tom Morris – engineering assistance
- Jim Morris – engineering assistance
- Rick Miller – engineering assistance
- Greg Calbi – mastering

== Chart performance ==
| Year | Chart | Position |
|---|---|---|
| 1984 | Billboard Jazz Albums | 15 |
| 1984 | Billboard 200 | 101 |
