= Stand Up (Steve Morse Band album) =

Studio album by Steve Morse
- Released: 1985
- Recorded: M.O.R. Studio and Cheshire Sound in Atlanta, Georgia
- Genre: Instrumental rock, hard rock
- Length: 39:15
- Label: Elektra
- Producer: Steve Morse

Steve Morse chronology
| The Introduction (1984) | Stand Up (1985) | High Tension Wires (1989) |

Professional ratings
Review scores
| Source | Rating |
|---|---|
| AllMusic | 3/5 stars |

Stand Up is the second studio album by the guitarist Steve Morse, released in 1985 by Elektra Records.

== Track listing ==
All tracks are written by Steve Morse, except where noted.

| No. | Title | Length |
|---|---|---|
| 1. | "Book of Dreams" (Morse, Van Temple) | 3:25 |
| 2. | "English Rancher" | 4:25 |
| 3. | "Rockin' Guitars" | 4:20 |
| 4. | "Distant Star" (Morse, Eric Johnson) | 3:56 |
| 5. | "Pick Your Poison" | 3:30 |
| 6. | "Stand Up" (Morse, Peter Frampton) | 3:40 |
| 7. | "Travels of Marco Polo" | 5:57 |
| 8. | "Golden Quest" | 4:15 |
| 9. | "Unity Gain" | 5:47 |
| Total length: | | 39:15 |

== Personnel ==
- Steve Morse – guitar, guitar synthesizer, engineering, production
- Jerry Peek – bass
- Rod Morgenstein – drums, percussion, piano, production
- Van Temple – vocals (track 1)
- Albert Lee – vocals (track 3), guitar (track 3)
- Eric Johnson – vocals (track 4), guitar (track 4)
- Mark O'Connor – violin (track 5)
- Alex Ligertwood – vocals (track 6)
- Peter Frampton – guitar (track 6)
- T Lavitz – piano (track 9)
- Tom Wright – engineering, mixing, mastering
- Mark Richardson – engineering
- Lewis Padgett – engineering
