= Structural Damage =

Studio album by Steve Morse
- Released: March 14, 1995
- Recorded: M.O.R. Studio in Ocala, Florida
- Genre: Instrumental rock
- Length: 43:00
- Label: High Street
- Producer: Steve Morse, Dave LaRue

Steve Morse chronology
Coast to Coast (1992)	Structural Damage (1995)	StressFest (1996)

Professional ratings
Review scores
Source	Rating
AllMusic	(No review)

Structural Damage is the sixth studio album by the guitarist Steve Morse, released on March 14, 1995, by High Street Records.

== Track listing ==
All music is composed by Steve Morse.

No.	Title	Length
1.	"Sacred Ground"	4:01
2.	"Good to Go"	4:54
3.	"Dreamland"	4:58
4.	"Barbary Coast"	3:27
5.	"Smokey Mtn. Drive"	3:43
6.	"Slice of Time"	2:37
7.	"Native Dance"	4:40
8.	"Just Out of Reach"	3:45
9.	"Rally Cry"	4:33
10.	"Foreign Exchange"	2:53
11.	"Structural Damage"	3:29
Total length:		43:00

== Personnel ==
- Steve Morse – guitar, mixing, producer
- Van Romaine – drums, percussion
- Dave LaRue – bass, mixing, producer
- Nigel Walker – engineering
- Michael Fuller – mastering
