= Steve Morse =

American guitarist (born 1954)

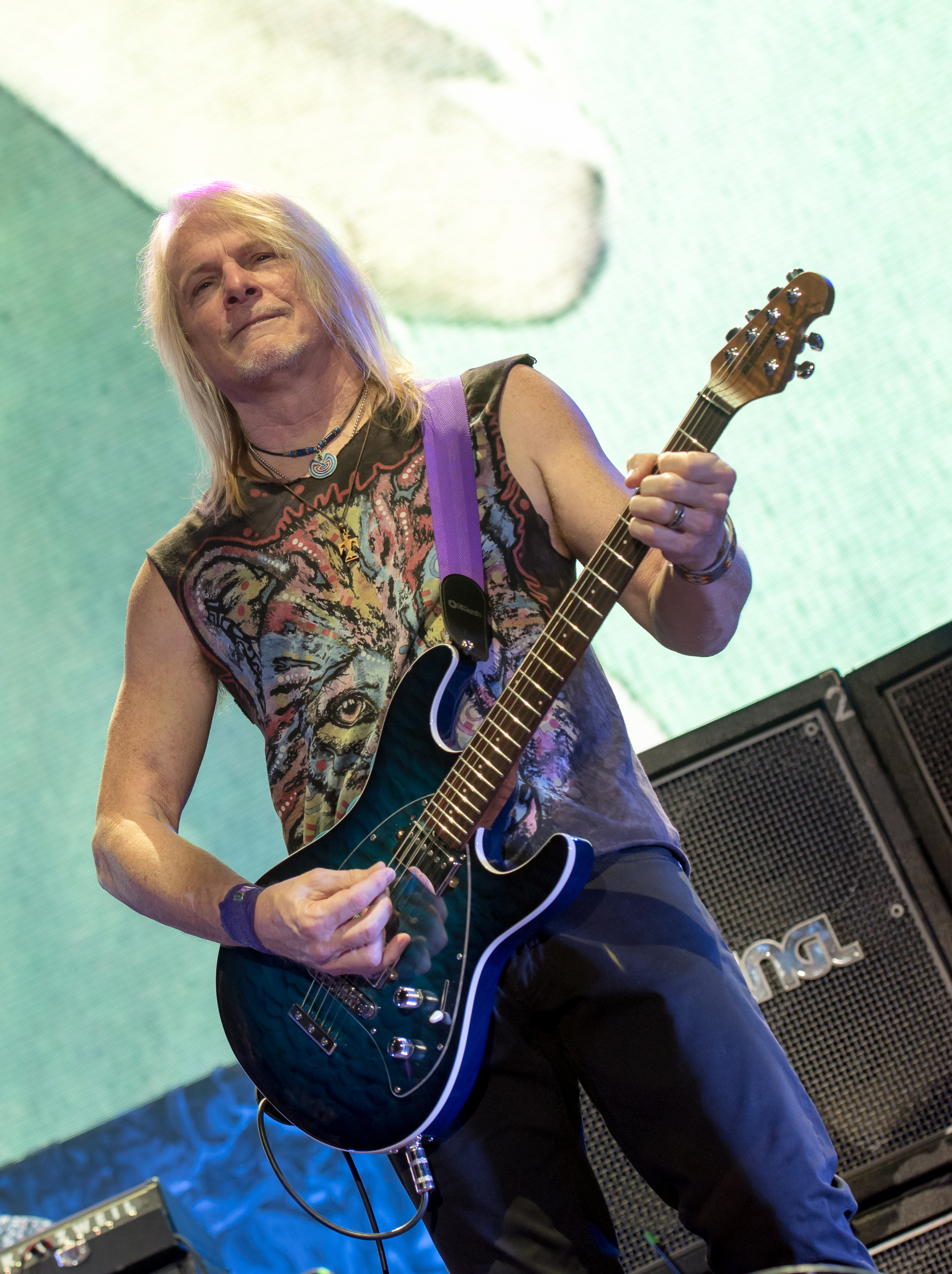
- Morse performing with Deep Purple in Hamburg in 2017

Background information
- Born: July 28, 1954 (age 72); Hamilton, Ohio, U.S.
- Genres: Instrumental rock, progressive rock, hard rock, heavy metal, jazz fusion
- Occupation: Musician
- Instrument: Guitar
- Years active: 1970–present
- Member of: Dixie Dregs; Flying Colors
- Formerly of: Kansas; Deep Purple; Living Loud; Angelfire
- Website: stevemorse.com

Steve J. Morse (born July 28, 1954) is an American guitarist and songwriter. A seven-time Grammy nominee, he is best known as the founder of the Dixie Dregs and as the longest serving guitarist for Deep Purple, having joined in 1994. Morse also enjoyed a successful solo career and was a member of the group Kansas in the mid-1980s. Morse became a member of the supergroup Flying Colors in 2011.

== Early life and education ==
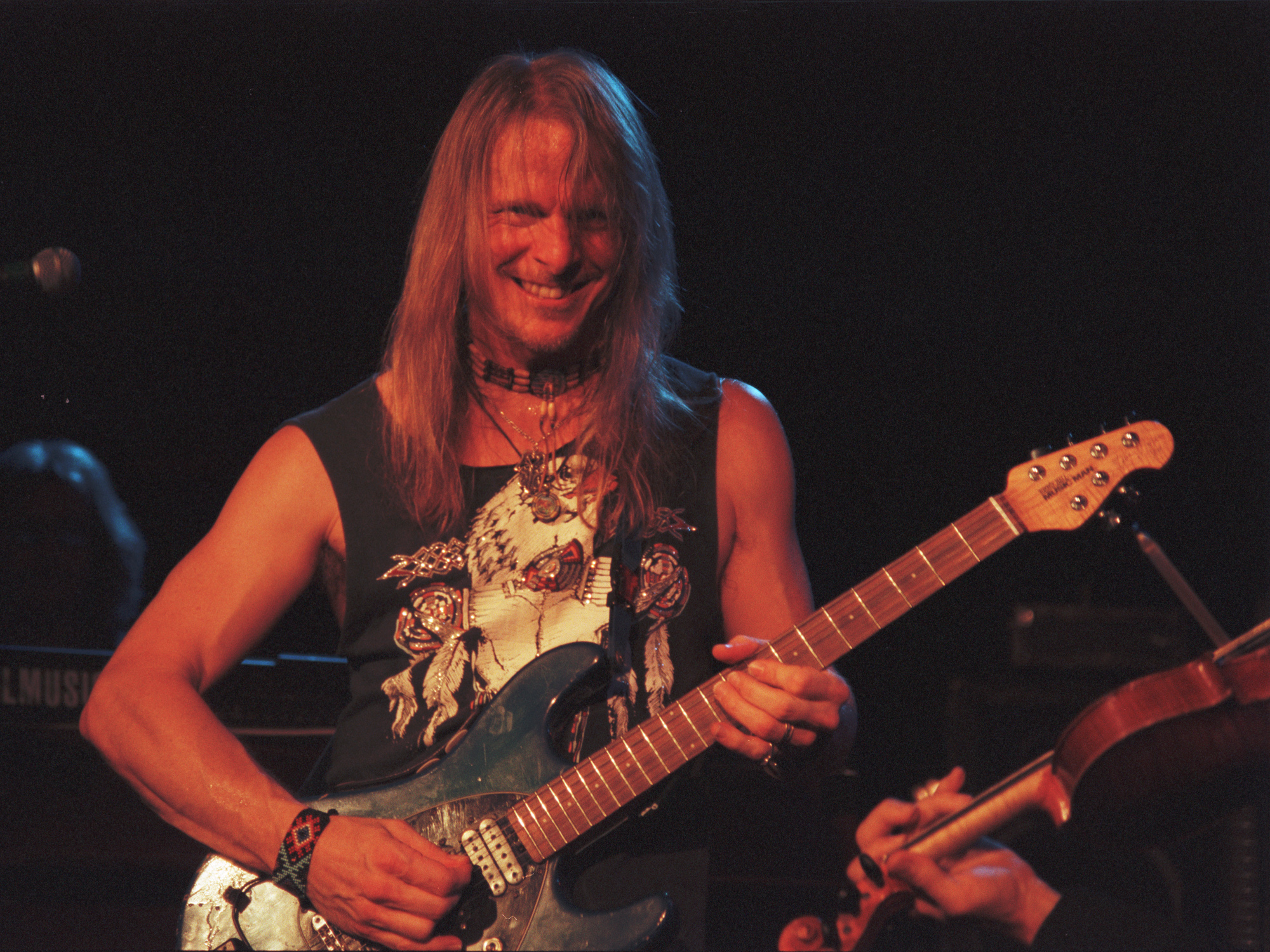
Morse performing with Dixie Dregs at Roxy Theatre in Hollywood, California in August 1999

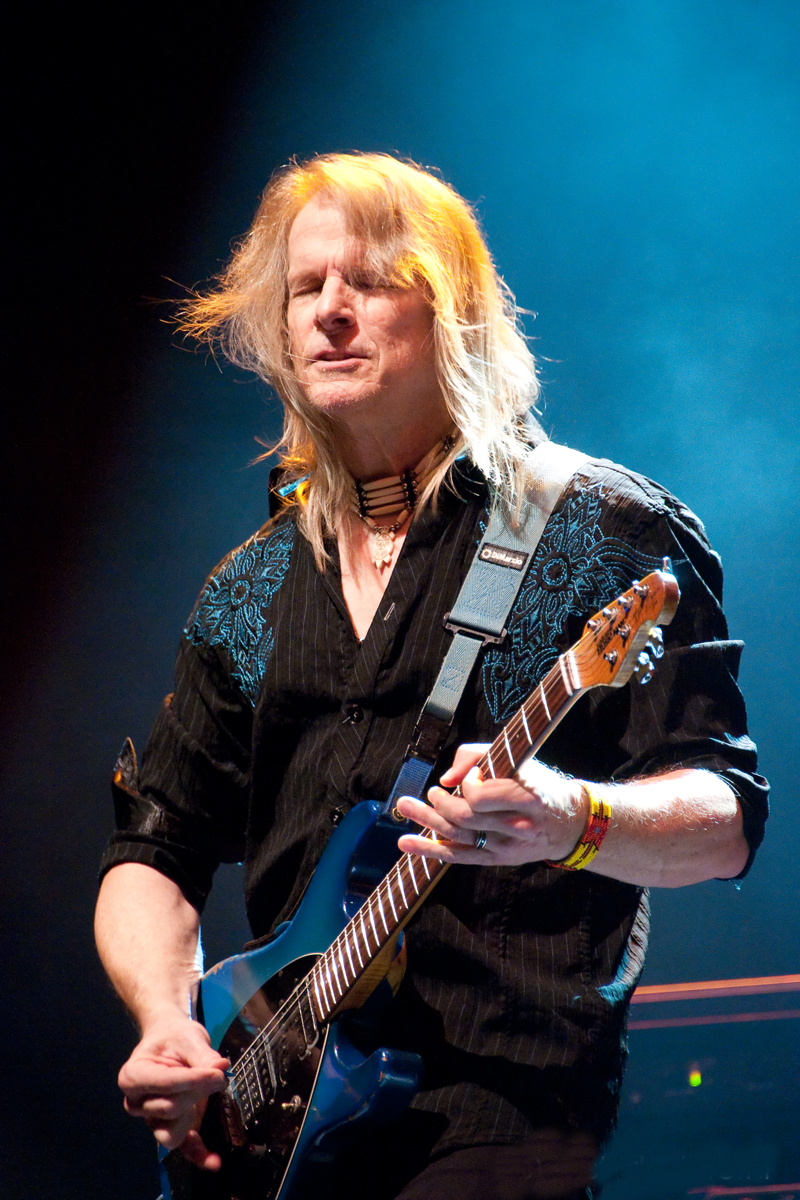
Morse performing with Flying Colors in Tilburg, Netherlands in September 2012

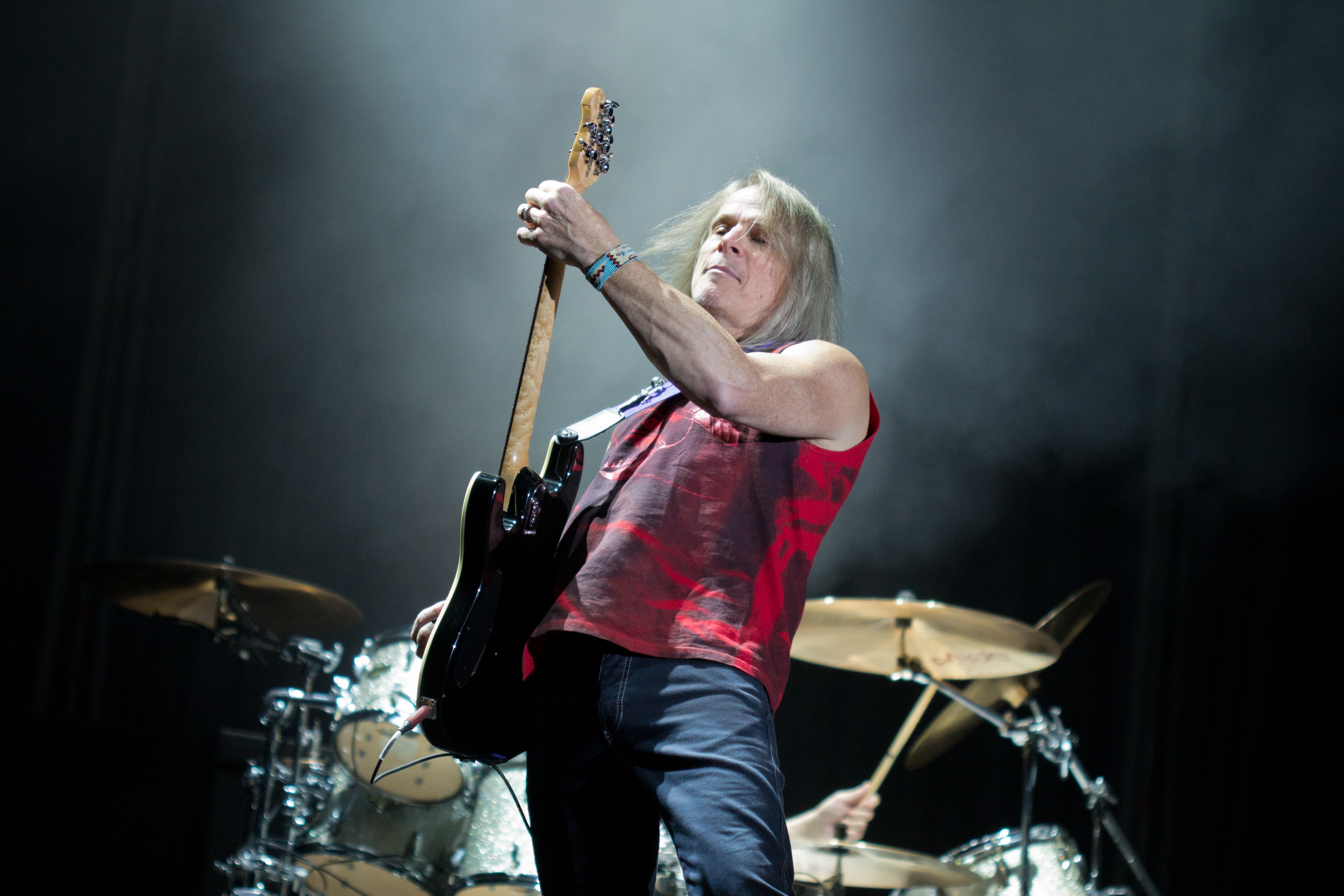
Morse performing with Deep Purple in Ávila, Spain in July 2013

Steve Morse was born in Hamilton, Ohio. His family soon moved to Tennessee and then to Ypsilanti, Michigan, where Morse spent his childhood. Although familiar with piano and clarinet, Morse ultimately became a guitarist.

Morse played briefly with his older brother Dave in a band called the Plague until the family moved to Augusta, Georgia. In the late 1960s, he played in a band called Three with his older brother and a junior high schoolmate, William Gerald (Jerry) Wooten, who played keyboards. The three performed at a local psychedelic youth club, the Glass Onion, and at Legion Halls and church functions.

While enrolled in the Academy of Richmond County, Morse met bassist Andy West and together they formed the Dixie Grit, adding keyboardist Johnny Carr and guitarist and vocalist Frank Brittingham, with Dave Morse drumming. This short-lived group played material from groups such as Led Zeppelin and Cream. West and Morse continued to play as a duet billed as the Dixie Dregs until Morse's expulsion from school in the 10th grade for refusing to cut his hair.

Steve completed 11th grade at a local Catholic school and was eligible for early college enrollment. He enrolled at the University of Miami School of Music.

During the 1970s, the University of Miami played host to a number of future influential musicians, including Bruce Hornsby, Pat Metheny, and Jaco Pastorius. Andy West also enrolled at the University of Miami, and with Morse, drummer Bart Yarnold, keyboardist Frank Josephs and violinist Allen Sloan, collaborated in a lab project entitled Rock Ensemble II. In 1975, the group compiled a recording used for promotional efforts. It was originally released on vinyl in 1976, and again on CD in 1997 as The Great Spectacular.

From late 1987 to early 1988, Morse worked as a commercial airline co-pilot. He has lived in Ocala, Florida since 1991, where he is involved in hay farming.

== Dixie Dregs ==
Upon Morse's graduation from the University of Miami, he and West officially named their group Dixie Dregs. A fellow University of Miami alumnus, Rod Morgenstein, replaced the injured Bart Yarnold and the band began performing regularly; with some of their own compositions, along with material by John McLaughlin and southern rock favorites. An increasingly heavier performance schedule eventually led to the attention of Capricorn Records recruiters including Allman Brothers Band manager Twiggs Lyndon, and in late 1976, the group was signed by the southern rock label.

Their first effort for Capricorn, Free Fall, established Morse as an important newcomer to the fusion genre, and he was recognized for both his compositional skills (having written all 11 tracks) and his musicianship. Although receiving positive reviews as a pivotal jazz fusion album, it sold poorly.

What If was released in 1978. Writing credits were more collaborative and the band's sound had matured into more than what was strictly considered fusion at the time. Southern rock, classical, folk and country elements were combined to form a cohesive and listenable music. Although supported by a tour, record sales remained flat, but gained Morse and the band an invitation to perform at Montreux Jazz Festival on July 23, 1978. Four songs from the recorded performance were released the following year on Night of the Living Dregs. Capricorn went bankrupt in late 1979, and the Dixie Dregs were left without a label.

Arista Records signed the band in 1979 to record three albums. Production control was handed to Morse, and Dregs of the Earth was released in May 1980. All eight tracks were written by Morse, and the album peaked at number 27 on Billboard's Jazz Album Chart.

Arista became increasingly concerned about Dixie Dregs' album sales and pressured the band to change their name to simply the Dregs in an attempt to increase the band's visibility in the public eye. Unsung Heroes included seven new Morse compositions, plus a shortened re-arrangement of "Cruise Control," in early 1981, but the name change did little to address Arista's worries. The Dregs felt compelled by label management to add lyrics to their next release, appropriately titled Industry Standard.

Morse's compositions on Industry Standard began to sound more like his evolving solo work than Dregs' collaborations, and the album received critical and public praise. Industry Standard was voted "Best Guitar LP" by readers of Guitar Player magazine in their annual reader's poll that year. Additionally, Morse was voted "Best Overall Guitarist" in the same poll, an honor that he would hold for five consecutive years (which ended his eligibility by retiring him into their "Gallery of Greats", a distinction shared only by Steve Howe of Yes and Eric Johnson). After fulfilling their commitment to Arista, the Dregs' members, who had tired of touring, disbanded in early 1983.

In the late 1980s, the group reunited for a tour featuring former members Morse, Morgenstein, Lavitz and Sloan. Their return was complemented by a "Best Of" release entitled Divided We Stand. Bassist Dave LaRue completed the lineup for a seven date tour culminating in the 1992 live album Bring 'em Back Alive. Violinist Jerry Goodman, of Mahavishnu Orchestra fame, filled in for Sloan, who was frequently absent as a result of his medical career. They signed a deal with former label Capricorn Records for their first studio album in years, entitled Full Circle, in 1994.

== Steve Morse Band and Kansas ==
After the 1983 breakup of the Dregs, Morse then formed the Steve Morse Band, a trio with bassist Jerry Peek and drummer Doug Morgan (formerly a member of Glass Moon). After the first tour of the eastern United States, Morgan left for previous commitments; the choice to replace Morgan was Rod Morgenstein. They began recording The Introduction in September, which included British country guitarist Albert Lee making a guest appearance on the track General Lee. The group toured Germany in early 1984 with Morse conducting clinics, and the group was signed by Elektra Records, who released The Introduction mid-year. A second German tour began in December 1984 and Stand Up was released in 1985. This effort included guest vocalists and guitarists (Eric Johnson, Alex Ligertwood, Peter Frampton, Albert Lee, Van Temple), and violinist Mark O'Connor. He toured with Rush as a main opener on their Power Windows tour.

In 1986, Morse joined the rock group Kansas. During his time with the band they released two albums, Power and In the Spirit of Things. While he was with the band, Kansas had its last big hit, "All I Wanted," which reached the Billboard Top 20 and on which Morse received co-writing credit. Morse left the band after touring behind the latter album. He re-joined the band for part of its 1991 tour.

Following this, Morse resumed the Steve Morse Band with new personnel (bassist Dave LaRue and drummer Van Romaine) and has released several further recordings, even after joining Deep Purple.

== Deep Purple ==
In 1994, Morse joined the British hard rock group Deep Purple, replacing Ritchie Blackmore (after Joe Satriani had initially replaced Blackmore on a temporary basis, for the final leg of The Battle Rages On tour in Japan, and European dates the following summer). With 28 years as a member of the band, Morse was their longest-serving guitarist and played on eight studio albums with them, between 1996's Purpendicular and 2021's Turning to Crime, and appeared on several live albums.

His departure from Deep Purple, announced on 23 July 2022, was driven by the illness of his wife Janine. After a lengthy battle with Stage 4 cancer, Janine Morse passed away in February 2024.

== Living Loud ==
In addition to playing with Deep Purple, Morse, together with Jimmy Barnes, Bob Daisley, Lee Kerslake and Don Airey, formed Living Loud in 2003. The group released one studio album and a live DVD in 2004/2005. In Spring 2010 it was reported that Steve Morse and Bob Daisley started work on a new studio album which was set for a release in 2011, but nothing came of this.

== Angelfire ==
Morse began a collaboration with singer Sarah Spencer in 2007 entitled Angelfire. The album, of the same name, was released on August 10, 2010, on Radiant Records. The album features Dave LaRue and Van Romaine of the Steve Morse Band on bass and drums, respectively. The album has a textural, acoustic sound that differs from Morse's previous work. Angelfire opened for the Steve Morse Band for several shows in California (January) and Florida (March) of 2010.

== Flying Colors ==
In 2011, Morse joined Flying Colors, an American supergroup composed of Mike Portnoy, Dave LaRue, Casey McPherson and Neal Morse, whose debut eponymous album was released on March 26, 2012, and debuted at No. 9 on Billboard's Hard Rock chart, and No. 11 on the BBC's Rock Album charts. Flying Colors released its second album, Second Nature, in 2014, and third album, Third Degree, in 2019, both to critical acclaim.

== G3 ==
In 2012 Steve Morse joined G3 project on their South American and European tour together with Steve Vai, John Petrucci and Joe Satriani.

== Artistry ==
Morse has proven himself throughout his career as capable of playing highly complex chord structures in classical sequences, as well as being able to play fast, alternate picked arpeggios. He is well known for using harmonics and improvising them in songs during live performances, such as in Deep Purple's "Sometimes I Feel Like Screaming".

=== Songwriting ===
Steve Morse has been characterized as a musical "jack of all trades". In the words of Guitar Player's Jas Obrecht, Morse seamlessly blends "heavy metal, Baroque/classical, freeform jazz/rock, bluegrass, chicken pickin' country, Irish jigs" with "energy and finesse". In regard to his songwriting method, Morse stated:

I write them on guitar or piano, late at night when there are no distractions. I start with some germ of an idea that I like a lot and believe in because I'm going to have to work with it for a couple of months, on and off. The main thing is getting an idea that will stand up to the test of repeated playing and listening. It could be a chord progression, a bass line, a guitar lick, or a complete piano section. On piano, you generally come up with melody and bass line all at once. The hard part is continuing after that start, because you can't just get another idea that you love and smash it into it. You have to get one that fits. You have to keep getting ideas and throwing them out.

Steve Morse is well-versed in a number of techniques - trilling, string skipping, alternate picking, artificial harmonics and legato - which he employs on his solos, guitar riffs and chord progressions.

=== Picking ===
Morse consciously avoids the use of hammer-ons and pull-offs. While he contends these work for the blues-inspired licks of guitarists such as Alvin Lee, Jimi Hendrix and Jimmy Page, for faster and more technical music it's better to pick all notes. This change of technique was inspired by Led Zeppelin's "Communication Breakdown", especially the guitar solos. One of his friends had a guitar magazine and showed him an article about the band. He said to Morse: "Look, [Page] practices nine hours a day and he picks every note!" Morse tried it out; he said that he "lost a lot of the soul and fluidity of my playing, but I kept at it" until he finally "started to get a breakthrough." The definite turning point came when he watched the Mahavishnu Orchestra at the University of Miami playing Inner Mounting Flame (1971) live. That "made a big impression". He also noted that John McLaughlin "was picking everything."

== Legacy ==
Morse is considered one of the hardest working guitarists in the world. He is widely known for his stylistically diverse compositional skills and was voted "Best Overall Guitarist" by Guitar Player magazine for five years in a row, qualifying him for its "Guitar Player Hall of Fame", the only other members being Steve Howe of Yes and Eric Johnson. He is regularly cited by John Petrucci as a major influence. Guitarist Shawn Lane regarded Steve Morse as one of the most talented guitarists of his time. Ritchie Blackmore, who preceded Morse in Deep Purple, has stated, "Steve Morse is an incredible player. A lot of people try to get some wisecrack out of me, but when you're talking about guitar players along Morse's caliber, they're brilliant."

== Gear and equipment ==
=== Guitars ===
Throughout the 1970s and 1980s Morse used his custom "FrankenTele" guitar. It was made up of a Fender Telecaster body with a Stratocaster neck, a Gibson trapeze-style tailpiece (coming from a twelve-string guitar) and four pickups in HSSH configuration. At one time, the guitar had a fifth pickup, a hexaphonic pickup with a separate output for each string; it provided the signal to drive a 360 Systems Spectre guitar synthesizer. Morse has an exact replica of this guitar at home "in case the worst happens."

Morse also used a black Fender Lead III circa 1982, being featured on the ads of this guitar series.

Morse worked with Music Man Guitars to create two signature models: a modernized version of Morse's first "Frankenstein Telecaster" guitar (Steve Morse Signature), and the Steve Morse SM Y-2D, is an updated version with quilted maple top.

=== Pickups ===
Morse has released two signature humbuckers with DiMarzio; the DP 205 Neck model and the DP 200 Bridge model. They are evenly balanced to allow playing all over the fretboard, since Morse plays high notes on the neck pickup and low ones on the bridge. They are the main pickups into his signature model. Dimarzio also wires a custom wound single coil pickup for Music Man to use into the SM signature model.

He also uses a Roland GK-3 pickup for guitar synth.

=== Amplification ===
Morse is an endorser of ENGL amps. He has released a signature model, the ENGL E-656 Steve Morse signature amplifier. It is a three channel amp specially designed by Morse with a custom version of the famous ENGL "midrange matrix". In the past he used Peavey 5150 amps with Deep Purple, Marshall Jubilee, Peavey VTM 120 and Ampeg V4.

=== Live setup ===
Morse's live equipment includes two ENGL E 656 Signature heads and several Music Man guitars (both models), his number one still being his favorite. He splits up his signal to six different cabinets; four dry (without any FX) and two wet (with FX). He uses three Ernie Ball expression pedals to blend the fx into the mix. He uses a custom Skrydstrup R&D switching system to perform all the switching and the blending. His FX are very simple, consisting only of a Boss OC-3 Octaver and two delays: Electro-Harmonix Memory Man now replaced with the newest TC Electronic FlashBack TonePrint delay (Morse has created custom presets). He is also using a TC Electronic Polytune Mini guitar tuner. His live setup for Deep Purple is discussed by him for Premier Guitar magazine's Rig Rundown.

He also uses a Roland GR-55 guitar synth for orchestral and other textures.

== Discography ==
=== As Steve Morse Band and Solo ===
Date	Band	Title	Type	Notes
1985	Steve Morse Band	The Introduction	Studio	
1985	Steve Morse Band	Stand Up	Studio	
1989	Steve Morse	High Tension Wires	Studio	
1991	Steve Morse Band	Southern Steel	Studio	
1992	Steve Morse Band	Coast to Coast	Studio	
1995	Steve Morse Band	Structural Damage	Studio	
1996	Steve Morse Band	StressFest	Studio	
2000	Steve Morse	Major Impacts	Studio	
2002	Steve Morse Band	Split Decision	Studio	
2004	Steve Morse	Major Impacts 2	Studio	
2005	Steve Morse	Prime Cuts – From Steve Morse's Magna Carta sessions	Compilation	
2008	Steve Morse Band	Cruise Control – Live in New York 1992	Live	CD/DVD
2009	Steve Morse	Prime Cuts 2 – From Steve Morse's Magna Carta sessions	Compilation	
2009	Steve Morse Band	Out Standing in Their Field	Studio	
2025	Steve Morse Band	Triangulation	Studio	

=== With Dixie Dregs - studio albums ===
Date	Title	Type	Notes
1976	The Great Spectacular	Studio	self-released, re-released on CD in 1997
1977	Free Fall	Studio	
1978	What If	Studio	
1979	Night Of The Living Dregs	Studio	
1980	Dregs Of The Earth	Studio	
1981	Unsung Heroes	Studio	
1982	Industry Standard	Studio	
1994	Full Circle	Studio	

=== With Dixie Dregs - other albums ===
Date	Title	Type	Notes
1988	Off The Record	EP	Demo for Ensoniq synthesizers
1992	Bring 'Em Back Alive	Live	
1997	King Biscuit Flower Hour Presents Dixie Dregs	Live	Recorded on June 17, 1979
2000	California Screamin'	Live	
2005	Live At Montreux 1978	Live	DVD
2008	Live In Connecticut 2001 (+ Cruise Control)	Live	CD / DVD
2015	Wages Of Weirdness (CD)/Travel Tunes (download)	Live	1978 radio broadcast from KWFM in Tucson AZ, recorded at Lee Furr's Studios

=== With Deep Purple ===
Date	Title	Type	Notes
1995	Bombay Calling	Live	DVD / Digital Download
1996	Purpendicular	Studio	
1997	Live at The Olympia '96	Live	
1998	Abandon	Studio	
1999	Total Abandon Australia '99	Live	CD / DVD
2000	In Concert with The London Symphony Orchestra	Live	
2001	Live at the Rotterdam Ahoy	Live	Limited Edition
2001	The Soundboard Series	Live	box set with 6 double CDs
2002	Perihelion	Live	DVD
2002	Live At The Nec	Live	DVD
2003	Bananas	Studio	
2004	Live Encounters....	Live	CD / DVD, Recorded at Spodek, Katowice, June 3, 1996
2005	Rapture of the Deep	Studio	
2006	Live at Montreux 1996	Live	CD / DVD
2007	Live At Montreux 2006: They All Came Down To Montreux	Live	CD / DVD
2008	Around The World Live	Live	four DVD box-set
2008	Over Zurich	Live	DVD, Limited Edition
2011	Live At Montreux 2011	Live	CD / DVD, with Orchestra
2013	Now What?!	Studio	
2013	The Now What?! Live Tapes	Live	Limited Edition
2014	Celebrating Jon Lord At The Royal Albert Hall	Live	CD / DVD, with Bruce Dickinson, Glenn Hughes, Paul Weller, Rick Wakeman & Many Others
2014	Live In Verona 2011	Live	CD / DVD, with Orchestra
2015	From The Setting Sun... (in Wacken)	Live	CD / DVD
2015	... To The Rising Sun (in Tokyo)	Live	CD / DVD
2017	Infinite	Studio	
2017	The Now What?! Live Tapes Vol. 2	Live	Limited Edition
2017	The inFinite Live Recordings, Pt. 1	Live	Limited Edition
2020	Whoosh!	Studio	
2021	Turning to Crime	Studio	

=== With other bands ===
Date	Band	Title	Type	Notes
1986	Kansas	Power	Studio	
1988	Kansas	In the Spirit of Things	Studio	
1998	Kansas	King Biscuit Flower Hour Presents Kansas	Live	Recorded on February 14, 1989
2003	Living Loud	Living Loud	Studio	
2005	Living Loud	Live in Sydney 2004	Live	2CD/DVD
2005	Mario Fasciano, Steve Morse, Ian Paice, Don Airey	E-Thnik	Studio	
2009	Kansas	There's Know Place Like Home	Live	CD/DVD, guest guitar
2010	Angelfire (Steve Morse & Sarah Spencer)	Angelfire	Studio	
2012	Flying Colors	Flying Colors	Studio	
2013	Flying Colors	Live in Europe	Live	CD/DVD
2014	Flying Colors	Second Nature	Studio	
2015	Flying Colors	Second Flight: Live at the Z7	Live	CD/DVD
2019	Flying Colors	Third Degree	Studio	
2019	Flying Colors	Third Stage: Live in London	Live	
2019	Flying Colors	Morsefest 2019	Live	

=== Guest appearances with other artists ===
- 1977 Tropical Nights – Liza Minnelli
- 1979 Evening Pastoral – Rob Cassels Band
- 1980 Schemer-Dreamer – Steve Walsh (Guest electric guitar on Wait Until Tomorrow)
- 1981 I Wonder How Does Tarzan Shave/Cool In The Movies – Patrick Walsh
- 1982 Dixie Dregs demos – Fiona Flanagan (unreleased)
- 1983 Kamikazee Christian – Rob Cassels Band
- 1983 Art In America – Art in America
- 1983 The Touch- Sonny Turner
- 1986 Storytime – T Lavitz
- 1987 Stone From Which The Arch Was Made – Mark O'Connor
- 1987 Surveillance – Triumph (All the King's Horses and Headed for Nowhere)
- 1988 Southern By The Grace Of God: Lynyrd Skynyrd Tribute Tour 1987 – Lynyrd Skynyrd (Guitar on "Gimme Back My Bullets")
- 1988 Love Your Man – The Rossington Band
- 1990 Nashville Rendez-Vous – Marcel Dadi
- 1991 Fingers Crossing – Marcel Dadi
- 1992 Country Guitar Flavors – Marcel Dadi
- 1992 Lone Ranger – Jeff Watson (Guitar solo on Talking Hands)
- 1993 Coven, Pitrelli, O'Reilly – CPR
- 1994 Thonk – Michael Manring
- 1995 Carmine Appice's Guitar Zeus – Carmine Appice
- 1996 Dick Pimple Present Music From Turtle Island (Deep Purple in disguise)
- 1996 Signatures – Kevin Crider
- 1997 Storm – Torden & Lyn
- 2001 Seventh Key – Seventh Key (No Man's Land and Every Time It Rains)
- 2001 Nylon & Steel – Manuel Barrueco
- 2001 Feeding the Wheel – Jordan Rudess (Solos on Quantum Soup and Crack the Meter)
- 2001 Pavarotti & Friends For Afghanistan – Luciano Pavarotti (Smoke on the Water with Deep Purple)
- 2002 Camino Latino/Latin Journey – Liona Boyd
- 2004 Rhythm of Time – Jordan Rudess ("Bar Hopping with Mr. Picky" and "What Four")
- 2005 Guitar Farm – Steve Woolverton
- 2006 Gillan's Inn – Ian Gillan
- 2006 II – Deacon Street
- 2007 School of the Arts – School Of The Arts (On Fire and Portrait)
- 2008 Porta San Gennaro Napoli – Mario Fasciano / Rick Wakeman / Steve Morse / Ian Paice / Don Airey / Rob Townsend
- 2008 Brian Tarquin Presents... Fretworx – Brian Tarquin (on Towers)
- 2009 Trading 8s – Carl Verheyen Band (On Our Way)
- 2009 Classics Anthology – Rob Cassels Band
- 2011 Stay Tuned – Bernhard Welz
- 2011 Testimony 2 – Neal Morse (guitar solo on "Seeds Of Gold")
- 2011 Raised in Captivity – John Wetton (on Lost For Words)
- 2011 Guitar Passions – Sharon Isbin & friends
- 2011 Forth – Proto-Kaw
- 2012 A Proggy Christmas – The Prog World Orchestra
- 2012 The Fusion Syndicate – The Fusion Syndicate
- 2012 Concerto For Group And Orchestra – Jon Lord
- 2012 Great Gypsy Soul – Tommy Bolin & Friends (On Crazed Fandango)
- 2013 Garrett vs. Paganini – David Garrett
- 2013 Epilogue – The Prog Collective
- 2014 Caprice- David Garrett
- 2014 Guitars For Wounded Warriors – Brian Tarquin & Heavy Friends (on Freedom)
- 2014 A Song For You (single) – Mario Fasciano / Charlie Cannon / Steve Morse
- 2015 tHis is the tHing #1 – Purpendicular
- 2015 Citizen- Billy Sherwood
- 2016 Don't You Tell Me Not To Play Guitar (single) – Dorian Chiiwahwah Phallic
- 2016 Stay Tuned 1.5 – Bernhard Welz
- 2017 Band Of Brothers – Brian Tarquin
- 2017 Part 1 – Chelsea Constable
- 2018 The Mutual Admiration Society – Sterling Ball, John Ferraro & Jim Cox
- 2018 Guitars For Veterans – Brian Tarquin & Heavy Friends
- 2018 Con Brio – Legacy Pilots
- 2018 Stay Tuned (new version) – Bernard Welz
- 2018 Triumphant Hearts – Jason Becker
- 2019 1000 Hands – Jon Anderson
- 2019 All Blues – Peter Frampton
- 2020 Vegas Blue - Brian Tarquin
- 2020 Sidemen – Sidemen
- 2020 Aviation – Legacy Pilots
- 2021 Not In Kansas Anymore - A Prog Opera - Robby Steinhardt
- 2023 The Dreamer – Joseph: Part One – Neal Morse

=== Various artists compilations and tributes ===
- 1978 Hotels, Motels And Road Shows (various artists compilation)
- 1982 Radio 1 Rock Show themes (themes from English radio shows)
- 1985 Arista's Greatest AOR Hits: Portrait Of A Decade 1975–1985 (various artists compilation)
- 1989 Guitar's Practicing Musicians (various artists compilation)
- 1990 Ski Patrol (movie soundtrack)
- 1990 Metal Guitars (various artists compilation)
- 1991 Guitar's Practicing Musicians Vol. 2 (various artists compilation)
- 1991 Guitar Speak 3 (various artists compilation)
- 1992 Rock Guitar Greats (various artists compilation)
- 1992 Guitar On The Edge Vol. 2 (various artists compilation)
- 1992 Album Network Rock Tune Up 84 (various artists compilation)
- 1994 A Little On The CD Side Volume 14 (Musician magazine's new music sampler)
- 1994 Album Network Rock Tune Up 118 (various artists compilation)
- 1994 The Capricorn Sampler Volume One (various artists compilation)
- 1995 Tales From Yesterday (various artists tribute to Yes)
- 1995 A Little On The CD Side Volume 17 (Musician magazine's new music sampler)
- 1996 Crossfire – A Tribute To Stevie Ray (various artists tribute to Stevie Ray Vaughan)
- 1996 Working Man (various artists tribute to Rush)
- 1996 The Carols Of Christmas (various artist compilation)
- 1996 Animal Magnetism (various artists PETA benefit compilation)
- 1997 The Carols Of Christmas II (various artists compilation)
- 1997 Merry Axemas – A Guitar Christmas (various artists compilation)
- 1997 Jazz Fusion Vol. 2 (various artists compilation)
- 1997 aLIVE Down South (various artists Southern Rock compilation)
- 1997 Candlelight Moments: Dreamscape (various artists compilation)
- 1997 Healing Renew – Music in Harmony (various artists compilation)
- 1997 The Roots Of Rock: Southern Rock (various artists compilation)
- 1998 Guitar Battle (various artists compilation)
- 1998 The Show That Never Ends (various artists compilation)
- 1999 Legends Of Rock: The Progressive Rockers (various artists compilation)
- 1999 Tribute to the Titans (various artists compilation)
- 1999 Southern Rock Greats (various artists compilation)
- 1999 The Best Of Progressive Rock (various artists compilation)
- 1999 Rock Guitarists Forever Best (various artists compilation)
- 1999 Southern Rock Essentials (various artists compilation)
- 2001 Warmth In The Wilderness – A Tribute To Jason Becker (various artists tribute to Jason Becker)
- 2001 Sonic Residue From Vapourspace (Magna Carta remix album featuring the Morse song Led On)
- 2001 Guitar Heroes – Steve Morse Best (Dixie Dregs/Steve Morse Band/Kansas/Lynyrd Skynyrd/Deep Purple compilation)
- 2001 Audio's Audiophile Vol. 16: Rock And Grooves (various artists compilation)
- 2001 Unitone Guitar Series – A Portrait For Strings (various artists compilation)
- 2002 Southern Rock Christmas (various artists compilation)
- 2004 Classical Heartbreakers (various artists compilation)
- 2005 Visions of an Inner Mounting Apocalypse (various artists tribute to Mahavishnu Orchestra)
- 2005 Back Against The Wall (various artists tribute to Pink Floyd's The Wall)
- 2006 The Royal Dan: A Tribute (various artists instrumental guitar tribute to Steely Dan, featuring a different lead guitarist on 10 different songs)
- 2007 Freeway Jam – To Beck And Back – A Tribute (various artist tribute to Jeff Beck)
- 2008 This Is Fusion Guitar (various artists compilation)
- 2008 Led Box – The Ultimate Led Zeppelin Tribute (various artists tribute to Led Zeppelin)
- 2008 We Wish You A Metal Xmas And A Headbanging New Year (various artists compilation)
- 2009 Abbey Road – A Tribute To The Beatles (various artists tribute to The Beatles)
- 2009 An All-Star Salute To Christmas (various artists compilation)
- 2010 Tooth Fairy (movie soundtrack)
- 2012 Classic Rock Presents Prog – Prognosis 2.3 (various artists compilation)
- 2012 The Spirit Of Radio (various artists compilation)
- 2012 Songs Of The Century – An All-Star Tribute To Supertramp (various artists tribute to Supertramp)
- 2013 Fly Like An Eagle – An All-Star Tribute To Steve Miller Band (various artists tribute to Steve Miller Band)
- 2014 Midnight Rider – A Tribute To The Allman Brothers Band (various artists tribute to The Allman Brothers Band
- 2014 Light My Fire: A Classic Rock Salute to the Doors (various artists tribute to The Doors)
- 2015 The Classic Rock Society Presents... New Species Volume 21 (various artists compilation)
- 2015 Southern Rock Christmas (various artists compilation)
- 2016 Steve Morse – The Sessions (mp3 download compilation with tracks featuring Steve and various artists, which appeared on several different tribute albums before)
- 2018 Moore Blues For Gary – A Tribute To Gary Moore (various artists tribute to Gary Moore)

=== Other appearances ===
- 1984 companion LP with Debüt magazine (Germany) February 1984
- 1993 Lexicon demonstration CD
- 1995 Free Wave Jam – Advanced Micro Devices sound card promo CD with MIDI music files
- 1997 companion CD with Fingerstyle Guitar magazine #25 (with songs described in magazine)
- 1999 companion CD with Guitar Techniques magazine April 1999 (with songs described in magazine)

== Awards and nominations ==
Grammy Awards

- 1980: Best Rock Instrumental Performance – Night of the Living Dregs (1979) with The Dixie Dregs
- 1981: Best Rock Instrumental Performance – Dregs of the Earth (1980) with The Dixie Dregs
- 1982: Best Rock Instrumental Performance – Unsung Heroes (1981) with The Dixie Dregs
- 1983: Best Rock Instrumental Performance – Industry Standard (1982) with The Dixie Dregs
- 1990: Best Rock Instrumental Performance – High Tension Wires (1989)
- 1993: Best Rock Instrumental Performance – Bring 'Em Back Alive (1992) with The Dixie Dregs
- 1995: Best Rock Instrumental Performance – "Shapes of Things" single from Full Circle (1994) with The Dixie Dregs

Guitar Player Magazine

- 1982: Best Overall Guitarist
- 1983: Best Overall Guitarist
- 1984: Best Overall Guitarist
- 1985: Best Overall Guitarist
- 1986: Best Overall Guitarist
- 1987: Best Overall Guitarist
- 1982: Best Guitar LP - Industry Standard (1982) with The Dixie Dregs
- 1986: Best Country Guitarist
- 1989: Best Guitar LP - High Tension Wires (1989)
