= Coast to Coast (Steve Morse Band album) =

Studio album by Steve Morse
- Released: 1992
- Studio: M.O.R. (California, Florida)
- Genre: Instrumental rock
- Length: 36:23
- Label: MCA
- Producer: Steve Morse, Dave LaRue

Steve Morse chronology
Southern Steel (1991)	Coast to Coast (1992)	Structural Damage (1995)

Coast to Coast is the fifth studio album by the guitarist Steve Morse, released in 1992 by MCA Records. The album reached No. 30 on the Billboard Heatseekers chart.

== Critical reception ==
Professional ratings
Review scores
Source	Rating
AllMusic	4/5 stars

Daniel Gioffre at AllMusic described Coast to Coast as "a fine offering from a talented and overlooked musician and songwriter." Praise was given to Morse for "using all of the tools in his sizeable vocabulary" and for songs that "exhibit a wide variety of musical influences."

== Track listing ==
All music is composed by Steve Morse.

No.	Title	Length
1.	"User Friendly"	3:42
2.	"Collateral Damage"	3:54
3.	"Get It in Writing"	3:52
4.	"Morning Rush Hour"	3:29
5.	"Runaway Train"	3:05
6.	"Long Lost"	3:35
7.	"The Oz"	3:19
8.	"Over Easy"	5:15
9.	"Cabin Fever"	3:49
10.	"Flat Baroque"	2:23
Total length:		36:23

== Personnel ==
- Steve Morse – guitar, arrangement, engineering, mixing, producer
- Van Romaine – drums, arrangement
- Dave LaRue – bass, arrangement, engineering, mixing, production
- Rick Sandidge – mixing, mastering
- Glen Meadows – mastering

== Chart performance ==
Year	Chart	Position
1992	Billboard Heatseekers Albums	30
