= The Official Bootleg =

Rudess/Morgenstein Project

Live album by Rudess/Morgenstein Project
- Released: July 25, 2001
- Recorded: April 1997 – February 1999
- Genre: Rock, fusion
- Length: 52:53
- Label: Domo Records
- Producer: Rod Morgenstein & Jordan Rudess

Rudess/Morgenstein Project chronology
Rudess/Morgenstein Project (1997)	Rudess/Morgenstein Project (2001)

The Official Bootleg is a live album by Rudess/Morgenstein Project, made up of Jordan Rudess and Rod Morgenstein, released in 2001. The album is made up of tracks recorded during live shows taking place from April 1997 to February 1999.

== Track listing ==
All pieces are composed by Jordan Rudess and Rod Morgenstein.

1. "Over the Edge" – 6:37
2. "Drop the Puck" – 5:29
3. "Crossing Over" – 7:12
4. "Don't Look Down" – 7:29
5. "Night Wind" – 7:58
6. "Dead in the Water" – 6:17
7. "It's a Mystery" – 7:25
8. "Daylight" – 4:26

== Personnel ==
- Jordan Rudess – keyboards
- Rod Morgenstein – drums
