= The Great Spectacular =

Demo album by Dixie Dregs
- Released: 1976
- Recorded: 1975
- Studio: University of Miami
- Length: 34:27
- Label: Dregs

Dixie Dregs chronology
The Great Spectacular (1976)	Free Fall (1977)

Professional ratings
Review scores
Source	Rating
AllMusic	2/5 stars

The Great Spectacular is a self-produced demo album by the Dixie Dregs, recorded in 1975 on campus at University of Miami and released in 1976 only on limited vinyl. By the time the band had risen in popularity in the late 1970s, the record had been out of print, becoming a highly sought-after collector's item, and was re-released for the CD format in 1997.

== Overview ==
In addition to the album, a three song so was pressed for promotional purposes, and eight of the songs from this album were re-recorded for the Dixie Dregs' future releases. The first three tracks ("Refried Funky Chicken", "Holiday" and "Wages of Weirdness") were re-recorded on their debut album Free Fall, while "Ice Cakes" and "What If" were re-recorded for What If, "Country House Shuffle" and "Leprechaun Promenade" for Night of the Living Dregs, and "The Great Spectacular" for Dregs of the Earth. "T.O. Witcher" was featured during Morse's time with Kansas on the album In the Spirit of Things. "Kathreen" hasn't appeared elsewhere.

On the making of The Great Spectacular, guitarist and bandleader Steve Morse recalled:

"The preparation for that album is the part I liked best. We were together as an ensemble and playing—usually for free—somewhere on campus at the University of Miami or around the city of Miami. The recording itself was stark and unpolished. We had to record it in one night after a long day of school and classes. It was done late at night. We were 19-20 years-old. It wasn't really a studio. They just put the recording equipment in a live concert hall. We were set up in there with headphones. My amp was in an elevator shaft. The violin, Fender Rhodes and bass went direct. The drums were on stage. It was bizarre. We had to trudge upstairs to the very back where the projectionist would be in the movie theater and do the mix there. So, there was nothing great about the sound. But the preparation was the magic. The songs were in a good place because we had come together as a band."

== Track listing ==
All tracks composed by Steve Morse.

Side A
No.	Title	Length
1.	"Refried Funky Chicken"	3:50
2.	"Holiday"	3:55
3.	"Wages of Weirdness"	3:54
4.	"T.O. Witcher"	2:12
5.	"The Great Spectacular"	3:16

Side B
No.	Title	Length
6.	"Ice Cakes"	3:46
7.	"Leprechaun Promenade"	3:19
8.	"Country House Shuffle"	3:59
9.	"What If"	3:28
10.	"Kathreen"	2:50

== Personnel ==
Dixie Dregs:

- Rod Morgenstein – drums
- Steve Morse – guitars
- Allen Sloan – violin
- Andy West – bass guitar
- Frank Josephs – electric piano
