= High Tension Wires =

Studio album by Steve Morse
- Released: May 1, 1989
- Recorded: M.O.R. Studio, Cheshire Sound in Atlanta, Georgia
- Genre: Instrumental rock
- Length: 41:11
- Label: MCA
- Producer: Steve Morse

Steve Morse chronology
Stand Up (1985)	High Tension Wires (1989)	Southern Steel (1991)

Professional ratings
Review scores
Source	Rating
AllMusic	3/5 stars

High Tension Wires is the third studio album by the guitarist Steve Morse, released on May 1, 1989, by MCA Records. The album reached No. 182 on the U.S. Billboard 200.

== Track listing ==
All music is composed by Steve Morse.

No.	Title	Length
1.	"Ghostwind"	3:12
2.	"The Road Home"	4:47
3.	"Country Colors"	3:47
4.	"Highland Wedding"	3:21
5.	"Third Power"	4:16
6.	"Looking Back"	3:59
7.	"Leprechaun Promenade"	6:24
8.	"Tumeni Notes"	4:10
9.	"Endless Waves"	3:46
10.	"Modoc"	2:20
Total length:		41:11

== Personnel ==
- Steve Morse – guitar, synthesizer, engineering, mixing, production
- Jerry Peek – bass
- Rod Morgenstein – drums
- T Lavitz – keyboard, synthesizer, piano (tracks 2, 3, 7 & 9)
- Allen Sloan – violin (tracks 1, 7 & 8)
- Andy West – bass (track 7)
- Rick Sandidge – engineering, mixing
- Tom Wright – engineering
- Glenn Meadows – mastering
- Ricky Schultz – executive production

== Chart performance ==
Year	Chart	Position
1989	Billboard 200	182
