= Andy West =

American bass guitarist and composer (born 1953)

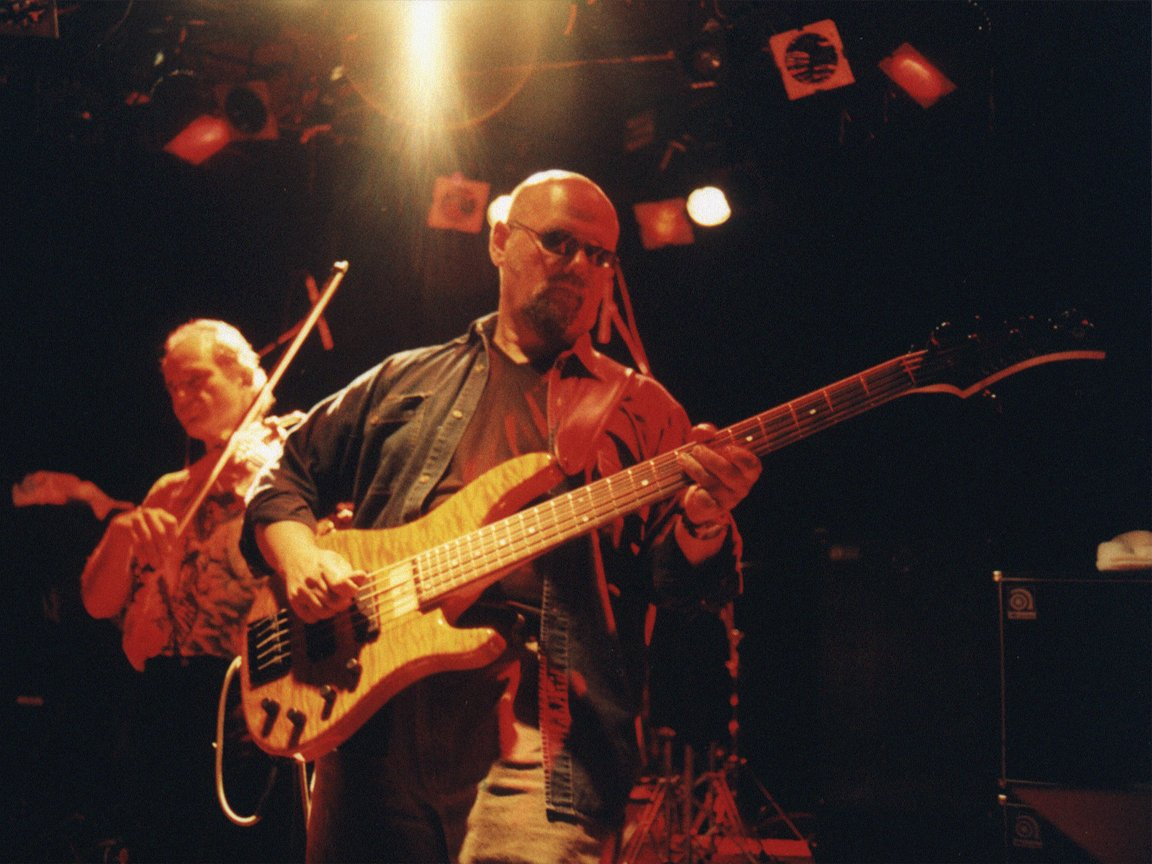

Background information
- Born: February 6, 1953 (age 73); Newport, Rhode Island, U.S.
- Genres: Progressive rock, jazz rock
- Instrument: Bass guitar
- Years active: 1970–present
- Member of: Dixie Dregs
- Website: andywest.com

Andy West (born February 6, 1953) is an American bass guitarist and composer who is an original founding member of the Dixie Dregs along with Steve Morse. Since the breakup of the original band in 1983, West has been on albums with Mike Keneally, Henry Kaiser, Paul Barrere, Vinnie Moore, and many others. His frequent style of playing bass is with a guitar pick, although he has performed in fingerstyle on several occasions. Since 1985, West has simultaneously pursued a career in the software industry while continuing to release albums sporadically. He currently works as a vice president for Analytics and Adaptive Learning at Pearson Education.

== Discography ==
=== With Dixie Dregs ===
- 1976 The Great Spectacular (Formally released in 1997)
- 1977 Free Fall - Capricorn Records
- 1978 What If - Capricorn Records
- 1979 Night of the Living Dregs - Capricorn Records
- 1980 Dregs of the Earth - Arista Records
- 1981 Unsung Heroes - Arista Records
- 1982 Industry Standard - Arista Records
- 1988 Off the Record
- 1989 Divided We Stand
- 1997 King Biscuit Flower Hour Presents - The Dregs 1979 - King Biscuit Flour Hour
- 2000 California Screamin
- 2002 20th Century Masters: The Best of the Dixie Dregs
- 2007 "Live at the Montreux Jazz Festival 1978" - DVD release

=== With Others ===
- 1984 Timmy - The Atlanta Project (4 Song EP produced by Eddie Offord) - Rudolf Music
- 1985 Vinnie Moore - Minds Eye - Shrapnel Records
- 1985 Steve Morse Band - High Tension Wires (on "Leprechaun Promenade", originally done as part of a promo for Ensoniq) - MCA Records
- 1986 Crazy Backwards Alphabet - SST Records
- 1986 Henry Kaiser - Those Who Know History Are Doomed to Repeat It - SST Records
- 1986 T Lavitz - Storytime (on "I'm Callin' You") - Landslide Records
- 1994 John French - Waiting on the Flame - Demon Records
- 1995 Paul Barrere - If the Phone Don't Ring (recorded 1983) - Zoo/BMG
- 1987 Joaquin Lievano - One Mind - Global Pacific Records
- 1995 The Mistakes - (with Mike Keneally, Henry Kaiser, Prairie Prince) - Immune Records.
- 2001 Andy West - Rama 1 - with Mike Portnoy, Mike Keneally, Rod Morgenstein, Toshi Iseda, Jonathan Mover, T Lavitz, Kit Watkins, and Jens Johansson - Magna Carta Records
- 2005 FWAP - Secret World (with Joaquin Lievano and Hilary Jones)
- 2019 Five Times Surprise (with Henry Kaiser, Anthony Pirog, Jeff Sipe, Tracy Silverman) - Cuneiform Records
