= StressFest =

Studio album by Steve Morse
- Released: April 1996
- Recorded: Sarm Studios in Checkendon
- Genre: Instrumental rock
- Length: 43:10
- Label: High Street
- Producer: Steve Morse, Dave LaRue

Steve Morse chronology
Structural Damage (1995)	StressFest (1996)	Major Impacts (2000)

Professional ratings
Review scores
Source	Rating
AllMusic	(No review)

StressFest is the seventh studio album by the guitarist Steve Morse, released in April 1996 by High Street Records.

== Track listing ==
All music is composed by Steve Morse.

No.	Title	Length
1.	"StressFest"	3:47
2.	"Rising Power"	3:58
3.	"Eyes of a Child"	4:32
4.	"Nightwalk"	4:24
5.	"Brave New World"	4:23
6.	"4 Minutes to Live"	3:53
7.	"The Easy Way"	5:20
8.	"Glad to Be"	4:34
9.	"Delicate Balance"	2:31
10.	"Live to Ride"	5:48
Total length:		43:10

== Personnel ==
- Steve Morse – guitar, mixing, production
- Van Romaine – drums, percussion
- Dave LaRue – bass, production
- Al Dowson – engineering
- Paul Wright – mixing
- Darren Schneider – mixing (tracks 4, 6, 9)
- Greg Rike – mixing (tracks 4, 6, 9)
- Mike Fuller – mastering
- Rod Fuller – mastering
