= What If (Dixie Dregs album) =

Studio album by Dixie Dregs
- Released: March 1978
- Recorded: 1978
- Studio: Chateau Recorders
- Length: 39:46
- Label: Capricorn
- Producer: Ken Scott

Dixie Dregs chronology
Free Fall (1977)	What If (1978)	Night of the Living Dregs (1979)

Professional ratings
Review scores
Source	Rating
AllMusic	4.5/5 stars
The Rolling Stone Jazz Record Guide	3/5 stars

What If is the second studio album by the Dixie Dregs, released in 1978.

== Production ==
The band sought, for What If, producer/engineer Ken Scott, because of his production of Mahavishnu Orchestra's Birds of Fire (1973). “Those guys were our heroes,” said guitarist and main composer Steve Morse. He added: “we were eager to work with Ken. We felt like we were graduating to the next level.”

== Track listing ==
Side A
No.	Title	Writer(s)	Length
1.	"Take It Off the Top"	Steve Morse	4:07
2.	"Odyssey"	Morse	7:35
3.	"What If"	Morse	5:01
4.	"Travel Tunes"	Andy West	4:34

Side B
No.	Title	Writer(s)	Length
5.	"Ice Cakes"	Morse	4:39
6.	"Little Kids"	Morse	2:03
7.	"Gina Lola Breakdown"	Morse, Twiggs Lyndon	4:00
8.	"Night Meets Light"	Morse	7:47

== Personnel ==
- Steve Morse – guitar, banjo
- Mark Parrish – keyboards
- Allen Sloan – violin, viola
- Andy West – bass guitar
- Rod Morgenstein – drums; vocals on "Ice Cakes"

Production

- Producer – Ken Scott
- Assistant engineers – Brian Leshon, Chris Gregg, Gary Coppola
- Mastered by SR/2*
- Recorded at Chateau Recorders
- Production coordinator – Steven Brooks

== Notes ==
- "What If" and "Ice Cakes" are re-recordings from the band's 1976 demo record The Great Spectacular.
- "Take It Off the Top" was used as the theme song for the Friday Rock Show for most of the show's run (from 1978 to 1993).
- American heavy metal guitarist James Murphy covered "Odyssey" on his Feeding the Machine solo album.
- Progressive metal band Dream Theater covered "Odyssey" for the special edition of their 10th studio album Black Clouds & Silver Linings.
