= Free Fall (Dixie Dregs album) =

Studio album by Dixie Dregs
- Released: May 27, 1977
- Recorded: 1976–1977
- Genre: Jazz rock
- Length: 41:25
- Label: Capricorn
- Producer: Stewart Levine

Dixie Dregs chronology
The Great Spectacular (1976)	Free Fall (1977)	What If (1978)

Professional ratings
Review scores
Source	Rating
AllMusic	4/5 stars
The Rolling Stone Jazz Record Guide	3/5 stars

Free Fall is the debut studio album by the Dixie Dregs, released in 1977. It was their first release on the Capricorn Records label. Three of the songs from this album ("Holiday", "Refried Funky Chicken" and "Wages of Weirdness") are re-recordings from the band's demo release The Great Spectacular (1976).

== Track listing ==
All songs written by Steve Morse.

Side A
No.	Title	Length
1.	"Free Fall"	4:40
2.	"Holiday"	4:29
3.	"Hand Jig"	3:16
4.	"Moe Down"	3:49
5.	"Refried Funky Chicken"	3:16
6.	"Sleep"	1:53

Side B
No.	Title	Length
7.	"Cruise Control"	6:14
8.	"Cosmopolitan Traveler"	3:01
9.	"Dig the Ditch"	3:50
10.	"Wages of Weirdness"	3:45
11.	"Northern Lights"	3:12

== Personnel ==
- Steve Morse – guitar, banjo, keyboards, guitar synth
- Allen Sloan – strings, violin, viola, electric violin
- Andy West – bass guitar
- Stephen Davidowski – keyboards
- Rod Morgenstein – drums, percussion
