= Industry Standard =

Studio album by the Dregs
- Released: 1982
- Length: 37:27
- Label: Arista
- Producer: Steve Morse, Eddy Offord

The Dregs chronology
Unsung Heroes (1981)	Industry Standard (1982)	Off the Record (1988)

Professional ratings
Review scores
Source	Rating
AllMusic	4.5/5 stars
The Rolling Stone Jazz Record Guide	4/5 stars

Industry Standard is the sixth studio album by the Dregs, released in 1982. The album garnered the group their fourth Grammy nomination. This was the final album by the Dregs before their split in 1983, and their last one for 12 years until the release of Full Circle in 1994.

Industry Standard was the band's only album featuring vocals by Alex Ligertwood (Santana) and Patrick Simmons (the Doobie Brothers); Ligertwood sang on "Crank It Up", while Simmons sang on and co-wrote "Ridin' High".

== Track listing ==
All tracks are written by Steve Morse, except where noted.

Side A
No.	Title	Writer(s)	Length
1.	"Assembly Line"		4:25
2.	"Crank It Up"	Morse, The Dregs	3:35
3.	"Chips Ahoy"		3:39
4.	"Bloodsucking Leeches"		3:59
5.	"Up in the Air"		2:27

Side B
No.	Title	Writer(s)	Length
6.	"Ridin' High"	Morse, Simmons	3:40
7.	"Where's Dixie?"		3:57
8.	"Conversation Piece"		6:12
9.	"Vitamin Q"		5:33

== Personnel ==
- T Lavitz – Keyboards, Saxophone
- Rod Morgenstein – Drums
- Steve Morse – Banjo, Guitar
- Mark O'Connor – Violin
- Andy West – Bass, Bass (Electric)

Guest performers

- Steve Howe duet with Steve Morse, "Up in the Air" – Guitar
- Alex Ligertwood – "Crank It Up" – Vocals
- Patrick Simmons – "Ridin' High" – Vocals
