= Southern Steel (album) =

Studio album by Steve Morse
- Released: February 5, 1991
- Studios: M.O.R., McDonough, Georgia
- Genre: Instrumental rock
- Length: 38:09
- Label: MCA
- Producer: Steve Morse

Steve Morse chronology
High Tension Wires (1989)	Southern Steel (1991)	Coast to Coast (1992)

Southern Steel is the fourth studio album by the American guitarist Steve Morse, released in 1991. "Cut to the Chase" appeared on the soundtrack to Ski Patrol. "Simple Simon" was a minor heavy metal radio hit. Morse promoted the album with a North American tour.

== Production ==
Morse, who wrote all of the album's songs, was backed by drummer Van Romaine and bass player Dave LaRue. Morse first worked on the music for "Arena Rock" during his time with Kansas.

== Critical reception ==
Professional ratings
Review scores
Source	Rating
AllMusic	3/5 stars
Calgary Herald	C
Chicago Tribune	3/4 stars

The Calgary Herald wrote: "Obviously an ardent Jeff Beck fan, this one rings with everything Beckish except Jan Hammer." The Chicago Tribune determined that "the album is fast and heavy hick-rock and though it goes through plenty of chord and tempo changes, Morse's fingers never get cold."

The Austin American-Statesman deemed the album Morse's "most mainstream rock to date." The Los Angeles Times called it "instrumental rock in overdrive but with conspicuous intelligence in the driver's seat."

Paul Kohler at AllMusic wrote that "Morse always delivers, especially on this uptempo, hard-hitting, instrumental rock virtuosity."

== Track listing ==
All music is composed by Steve Morse.

No.	Title	Length
1.	"Cut to the Chase"	3:53
2.	"Simple Simon"	3:49
3.	"Vista Grande"	5:04
4.	"Sleaze Factor"	3:39
5.	"Battle Lines"	4:07
6.	"Southern Steel"	3:56
7.	"Wolf Song"	3:22
8.	"Weekend Overdrive"	4:06
9.	"Arena Rock"	4:01
10.	"Point Counterpoint"	2:12
Total length:		38:09

== Personnel ==
- Steve Morse – guitar, guitar synthesizer, engineering, mixing, production
- Jeff Watson – guitar (track 1), mixing (tracks 1, 2)
- Van Romaine – drums
- Dave LaRue – bass guitar, engineering
- Rick Sandidge – mixing (except tracks 1, 2), mastering
- Glen Meadows – mastering
