= Rod Morgenstein =

American drummer (born 1953)

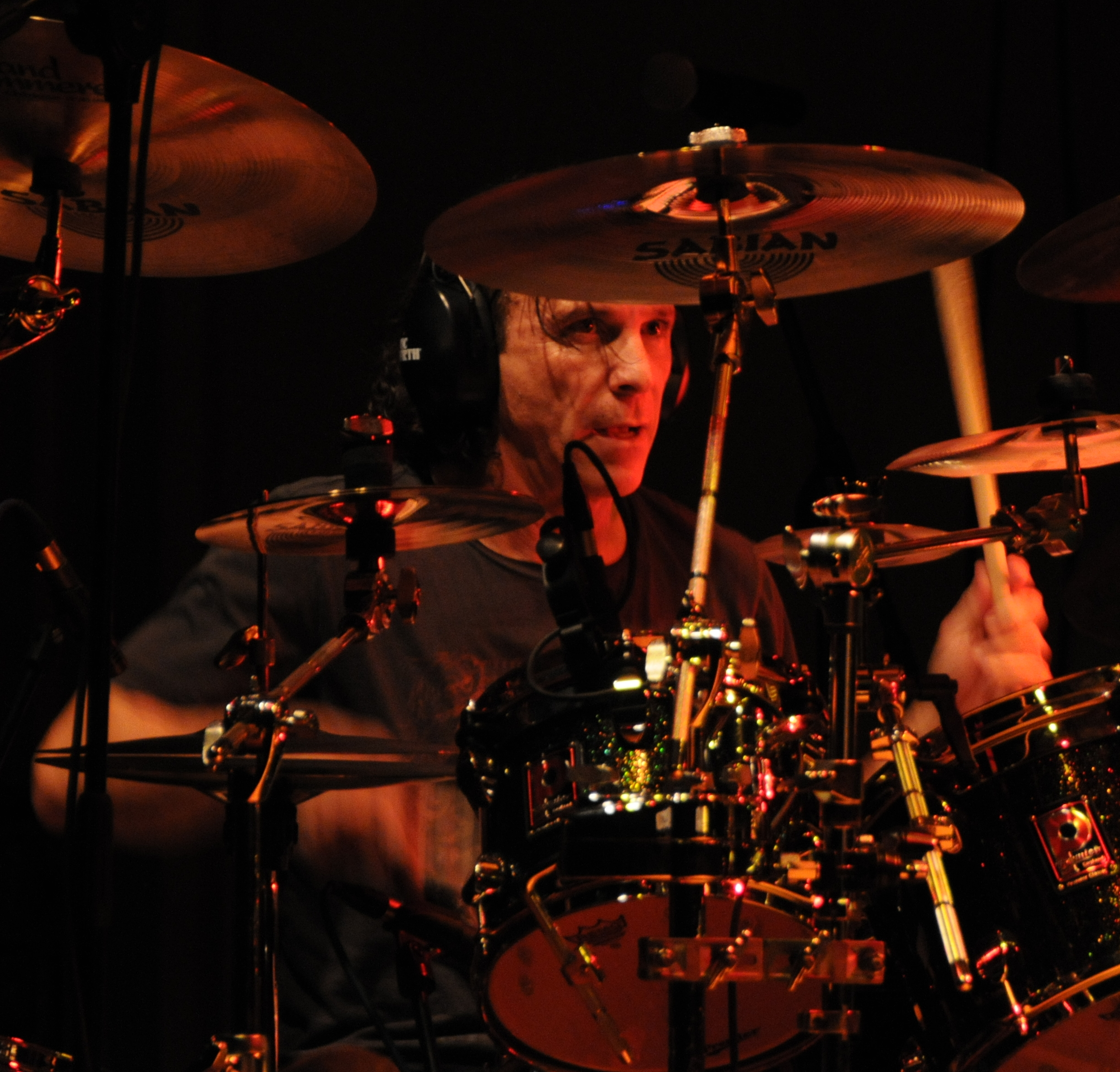
- Morgenstein in 2008

Background information
- Born: April 19, 1953 (age 72); New York City, U.S.
- Genres: Progressive rock; jazz fusion; hard rock; glam metal; progressive metal
- Occupations: Musician; educator
- Instruments: Drums; percussion
- Years active: 1973–present

Rod Morgenstein (born April 19, 1953) is an American drummer with rock bands Winger and Dixie Dregs.

He also played with Fiona, Platypus, the Steve Morse Band, and Jelly Jam. He has also done session work with Jordan Rudess including his ventures with the Rudess/Morgenstein Project. He also toured with Jazz Is Dead. He has also been awarded Modern Drummer's "Best Progressive Rock Drummer" five years (1986-'90), "Best All-Around Drummer" (1999) and was inducted into magazine's Honor Roll.

He worked for twenty years as a professor, teaching percussion at Berklee College of Music in Boston, Massachusetts. Morgenstein continues to tour with the band Winger. He has also been a columnist for Modern Drummer magazine.

Morgenstein is known for his versatility of playing many styles of music.

== Equipment ==
Morgenstein currently uses Premier drums, Evans Drumheads, Sabian cymbals, Vic Firth drumsticks, and LP Percussion. He has, in the past, also used Remo drumheads and Paiste cymbals.

Drums: Premier signia series (also uses the genista series):

- 22" x 18" bass drums (x2)
- 10" x 9" rack tom
- 12" x 10" rack tom
- 13" x 11" rack tom
- 16" x 16" floor tom
- 18" x 16" floor tom
- 14" x 6.5" snare
- 14" x 4" piccolo snare

Drumheads: Evans:

- Snare: G1 Coated or Power Center Reverse Dot/300 Snare Side
- Toms: EC2S Clear or G1 Clear (top and resonant)
- Bass: EQ4 Clear/EQ3 Black Bass Reso

Drumsticks: Vic Firth:

- Vic Firth Rod Morgenstein signature drumsticks (Length 16.12", Diameter: .610")

- described as essentially combining a 5B and 2B stick

Cymbals: Sabian:

- AA regular hi-hats 13"
- HH china kang 10"/AA splash 10" (stacked)
- AA splash 12"
- AA splash 10"
- AA splash 8"
- AAX stage crash 18"/cymbal disc 12" (stacked)
- AAX stage crash 16" (or studio crash)
- AA splash 10"
- Signature tri-top ride 21"
- HH china 20"
- HH thin crash 18"

Paiste cymbals (circa 1984):

- RUDE 14" hi-hats
- Formula 602 11" splash
- RUDE 16" crash/ride
- RUDE 18" crash/ride
- 2002 18" medium
- RUDE 20" ride/crash
- Formula 602 22" heavy
- 2002 20" china type
- Sound Creation 22" dark china

Cymbals circa 1988:

- 3000 14" sound edge hi-hats
- Formula 602 11" splash
- 3000 17" thin crash
- 3000 18" thin crash
- 3000 19" thin crash
- RUDE 22" ride/crash
- Sound Creation 20" dark china

== Discography ==
=== with Dixie Dregs ===
- The Great Spectacular (1976)
- Free Fall (1977)
- What If (1978)
- Night of the Living Dregs (1979)
- Dregs of the Earth (1980)
- Unsung Heroes (1981)
- Industry Standard (1982)
- Full Circle (1994)

=== with The Steve Morse Band ===
- The Introduction (1984)
- Stand Up (1985)
- High Tension Wires (1989)

=== with Winger ===
- Winger (1988)
- In the Heart of the Young (1990)
- Pull (1993)
- IV (2006)
- Karma (2009)
- Better Days Comin' (2014)
- Seven (2023)

=== with Fiona ===
- Heart Like a Gun (1989)

=== with Rudess/Morgenstein Project ===
- Rudess/Morgenstein Project (1997)
- The Official Bootleg (2001)

=== with Platypus ===
- When Pus Comes to Shove (1998)
- Ice Cycles (2000)

=== with The Jelly Jam ===
- The Jelly Jam (2002)
- The Jelly Jam 2 (2004)
- Shall We Descend (2011)
- Profit (2016)

=== with Jazz Is Dead ===
- Laughing Water (1999)
- Great Sky River (2001)
- Grateful Jazz (2015)
