= Unsung Heroes (Dixie Dregs album) =

Studio album by Dregs
- Released: 1981
- Genre: Jazz rock
- Length: 37:22
- Label: Arista
- Producer: Steve Morse

Dregs chronology
Dregs of the Earth (1980)	Unsung Heroes (1981)	Industry Standard (1982)

Professional ratings
Review scores
Source	Rating
AllMusic	2.5/5 stars
The Rolling Stone Jazz Record Guide	3/5 stars

Unsung Heroes is the fifth studio album by the Dixie Dregs, released in 1981. This was the band's first album released under the moniker Dregs. It received a Grammy nomination for Best Rock Instrumental Performance.

== Track listing ==
All tracks are written by Steve Morse.

Side A
No.	Title	Length
1.	"Cruise Control"	3:44
2.	"Divided We Stand"	5:00
3.	"I'll Just Pick"	3:27
4.	"Day 444"	7:02

Side B
No.	Title	Length
5.	"Rock & Roll Park"	4:35
6.	"Attila the Hun"	4:01
7.	"Kat Food"	4:58
8.	"Go for Baroque"	3:56

== Personnel ==
- Steve Morse – acoustic and electric guitars
- Andy West – fretted and fretless bass
- Allen Sloan – electric and acoustic 5 string violin
- Rod Morgenstein – drums and percussion
- T Lavitz – acoustic and electric piano, organ, synthesizer, clavinet, saxophone
