= Dregs of the Earth =

Studio album by Dixie Dregs
- Released: 1980
- Length: 36:14
- Label: Arista
- Producer: Steve Morse

Dixie Dregs chronology
Night of the Living Dregs (1979)	Dregs of the Earth (1980)	Unsung Heroes (1981)

Dregs of the Earth is the fourth studio album by Dixie Dregs, released in 1980. It was the band's first release on Arista Records, and its last one before changing its name to the Dregs. The album contains a re-recording of one of the band's earlier songs, "The Great Spectacular", which appeared on its 1976 demo The Great Spectacular.

== Critical reception ==
Professional ratings
Review scores
Source	Rating
AllMusic	3.5/5 stars
The Rolling Stone Jazz Record Guide	3/5 stars

At the time of release, the writers of Billboard placed review on this album in section "Recommended LP's". According to them the musical style of the band is hard to categorize, "but the musicianship is often superb".

The album received a Grammy Award nomination for Best Rock Instrumental Performance.

== Track listing ==
All tracks are written by Steve Morse.

Side A
No.	Title	Length
1.	"Road Expense"	3:24
2.	"Pride o' the Farm"	3:40
3.	"Twiggs Approved"	4:29
4.	"Hereafter"	6:21

Side B
No.	Title	Length
1.	"The Great Spectacular"	3:20
2.	"Broad Street Strut"	3:54
3.	"I'm Freaking Out"	9:06
4.	"Old World"	2:00

== Personnel ==
Dixie Dregs:

- Steve Morse - acoustic and electric guitars, banjo, pedal steel
- Andy West - fretted and fretless bass
- Allen Sloan - acoustic and electric violins, viola
- Rod Morgenstein - drums and percussion
- T Lavitz - acoustic and electric piano, organ, synthesizer, clavinet
