= Dixie Dregs =

American rock band

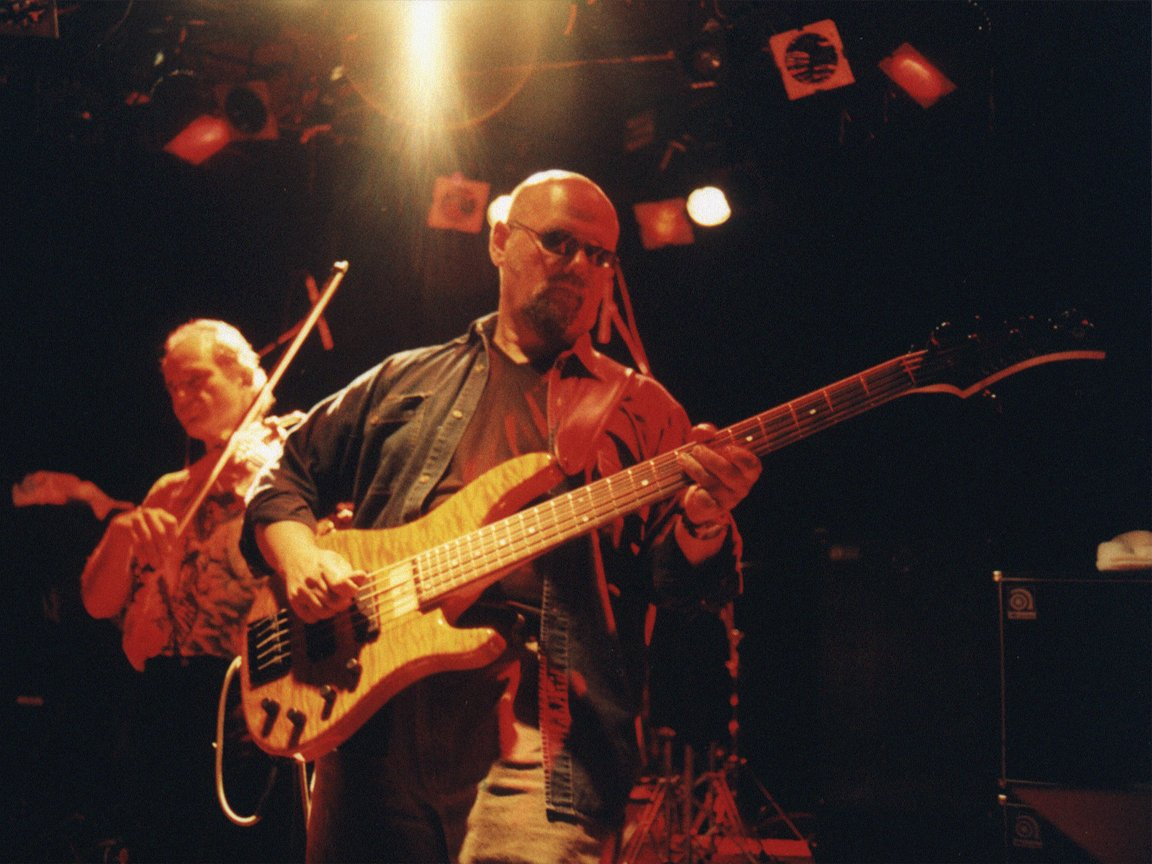
- Allen Sloan (left) and Andy West (center) of Dixie Dregs performing in 1999

Background information
- Also known as: Dixie Grit (1970–1971); Rock Ensemble II (1973); The Dregs (1981–1983)
- Origin: Augusta, Georgia, U.S.
- Genres: Jazz rock; instrumental rock; progressive rock; southern rock
- Years active: 1970–1983; 1988–present
- Labels: Capricorn; Arista; Regency
- Members: Steve Davidowski; Rod Morgenstein; Steve Morse; Allen Sloan; Andy West
- Past members: Frank Brittingham; Jordan Rudess; Johnny Carr; Gilbert Frayer; Jerry Goodman; Frank Josephs; Dave LaRue; T Lavitz; Dave Morse; Mark O'Connor; Mark Parrish; Bart Yarnold
- Website: Official website

The Dixie Dregs are an American rock band from Augusta, Georgia. Formed in 1970, the band is known for instrumental music that fuses elements of rock, classical music, country, jazz and bluegrass into an eclectic sound that is difficult to categorize. Recognized for their virtuoso playing, the Dixie Dregs were identified with the southern rock, progressive rock and jazz fusion scenes of the 1970s.

In 1975, the band recorded their demo album The Great Spectacular and self-released it in the following year in a limited pressing. The demo soon garnered attention from record labels, including Capricorn Records, with whom the Dixie Dregs would sign in 1976, and three albums were released for the label: Free Fall (1977), What If (1978) and Night of the Living Dregs (1979); the latter album, which was split between studio and live recordings, was nominated for a Grammy Award for Best Rock Instrumental Performance, and each of the band's next three albums would subsequently receive further Grammy nominations.

After Capricorn declared bankruptcy in 1979, the band signed with Arista Records, releasing the album Dregs of the Earth in 1980. The following year, the band changed their name to The Dregs, releasing two albums under this name, Unsung Heroes (1981) and Industry Standard (1982), which was the only album by the band to feature vocals. The band disbanded in 1983. After reuniting in 1988, the Dixie Dregs released Full Circle in 1994, and the live albums Bring 'Em Back Alive (1992) and California Screamin' (2000).

== History ==
=== Formation and early years ===
The Dixie Dregs evolved from an Augusta, Georgia, band called Dixie Grit, formed by Steve Morse and Andy West in 1970. The band featured Morse's older brother Dave on drums, Frank Brittingham (guitar and vocals) and Johnny Carr (keyboards). Carr was later replaced by Mark Parrish. Shortly after Steve Morse's enrollment at University of Miami's School of Music in 1971, Dixie Grit was disbanded. Morse and West continued performing as a duo, calling themselves the Dixie Dregs (the "Dregs" of "Dixie Grit").

In 1973, Steve Morse (guitar), Andy West (bass), Allen Sloan (violin) and Bart Yarnal (drums) met while students at the University of Miami's School of Music to play as Rock Ensemble II. West also attended Georgia State University for a year while studying cello and music theory and composition along with Parrish. Parrish remained at GSU during the academic school years only to return to Augusta, Georgia, during summer breaks - re-establishing the guitar/bass/keyboards/drums quartet with Morse, West, Parrish, and Gilbert Frayer (drums) performing as opening acts for concerts and headlining local gigs as Dixie Dregs.

During subsequent academic school years, the remaining members of the Dregs, including Andy West, returned to the University of Miami and Mark Parrish returned to Atlanta, Georgia, to complete his degree in music performance and composition at Georgia State University, under the study of William Masselos, with additional studies of electronic music at Columbia University in New York City under Alice Shields, a protégée of Wendy Carlos.

=== First recording ===
At the time, the University of Miami hosted a lively musical community, including future professional musicians Pat Metheny, Jaco Pastorius, Danny Gottlieb, T Lavitz and Bruce Hornsby. Rod Morgenstein was asked to fill in as drummer after a surfing accident disabled Yarnal. In 1974, during the school years at UofM, keyboardist Frank Josephs was added to their lineup. In 1975, the group's first effort, The Great Spectacular (named by ex-"Dixie Grit" second guitarist and singer, Frank Brittingham) was recorded at the university. Approximately 1,000 copies of the original LP were pressed. The album was reissued in 1997 in CD form.

=== Signed to Capricorn ===
Based on the strength of a three-song demo and a tip from former Allman Brothers Band members Chuck Leavell and Twiggs Lyndon, Capricorn Records signed them in late 1976 to record their debut album Free Fall (1977). Steve Davidowski was the keyboardist on Free Fall. When Davidowski left to work with fiddler Vassar Clements, former Dixie Grit/Dixie Dregs keyboardist Mark Parrish rejoined the group later that year. The moderate success and critical acclaim of Free Fall led to their 1978 effort, What If, supported by their first tour with dates in New York, Georgia, Florida, South Carolina, North Carolina, Texas, Arizona, Massachusetts, Mississippi, and California.

Their third album, Night of the Living Dregs (featuring Morse, West, Sloan, Parrish, and Morgenstein), was released in April 1979, gaining the band their first Grammy nomination for Best Rock Instrumental Performance, won that year by Paul McCartney's band Wings. Night of the Living Dregs included studio recordings as well as compositions performed live and recorded at the Montreux Jazz Festival on July 23, 1978. Ken Scott, The Beatles' and producer/arranger George Martin's right-hand man and engineer, produced both Dixie Dregs albums, What If and Night of the Living Dregs.

=== Switch to Arista ===
In October 1979, Capricorn Records declared bankruptcy, and the band was signed by Arista Records in January 1980, to create three more albums. At that time, keyboardist Parrish left and was replaced by T Lavitz. Later that year, Dregs of the Earth (featuring Morse, West, Sloan, Lavitz, and Morgenstein) was released.

Parrish went on to play piano and keyboards for vocalists Andy Williams, Roberta Flack, Natalie Cole, Luther Vandross, Peabo Bryson, Celine Dion, Regina Belle, Deborah Gibson, Pat Boone and daughter Debby Boone, Glen Campbell and for guitarist Larry Coryell. He won an Angel Award as co-producer of a Christian album "With Reverence" by singer Charles Land where he arranged and played all the instrumental parts. He has also been musical director, conductor, and keyboard instrumentalist with the touring stage shows of Cats, Meet Me in St. Louis, The Wizard of Oz, Little Shop of Horrors, Nunsense, Brigadoon, The Phantom of the Opera, Anything Goes, and other Broadway stage shows.

=== Name change ===
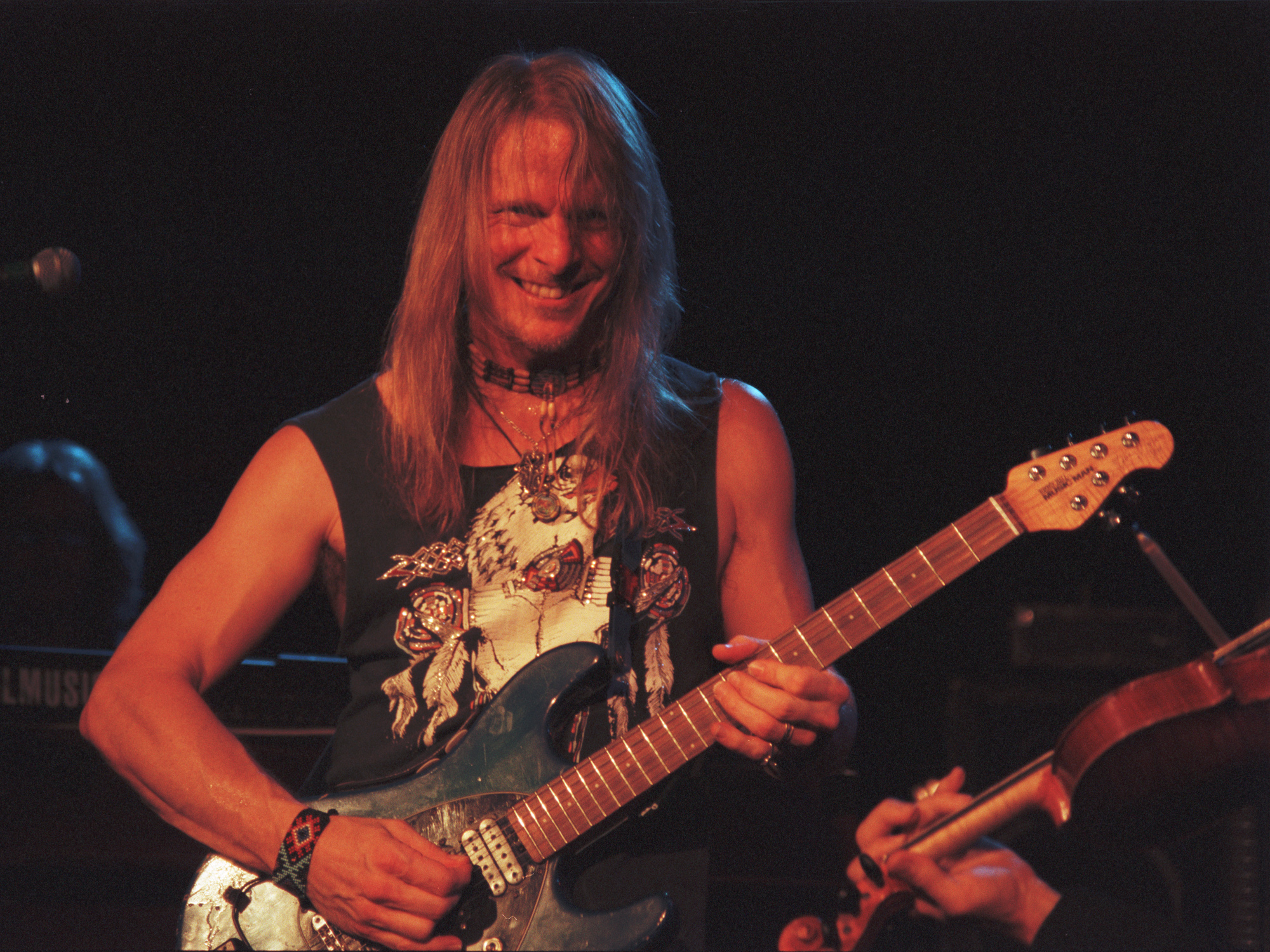
Steve Morse performing with the Dixie Dregs at the Roxy Theatre in 1999

For Unsung Heroes, released in 1981, the band changed their name to The Dregs in an effort to gain more commercial appeal. Violinist Sloan began pursuing a career in medicine at the Medical College of Georgia culminating in a residency in Anesthesiology and was subsequently replaced by Mark O'Connor, winner of Nashville's Grand Masters Fiddle Championship for their 1982 release, Industry Standard. This album introduced vocals for the first time, as a further attempt to gain more airtime. Guest vocalists included the Doobie Brothers's Patrick Simmons and Alex Ligertwood (Santana). Industry Standard provided the Dregs with another Grammy nomination for Best Rock/Jazz Instrumental Performance. The recent name change, vocal additions and a grueling touring schedule did nothing to improve sales, and in 1983, the members of The Dregs decided to disband the group, parting for individual projects.

=== Reunion ===
During the early 1980s, the British disc jockey Tommy Vance started using the Dixie Dregs track "Take It Off the Top" as his signature tune for the BBC radio show The Friday Rock Show.

In the late 1980s, the group reunited for a tour featuring former members Morse, Morgenstein (who was also playing with Winger), Lavitz, and Sloan. Their return was complemented by a "Best Of" release entitled Divided We Stand (1989). Bassist Dave LaRue completed the lineup for a seven date tour culminating in the 1992 live album Bring 'em Back Alive, which garnered them a fifth Grammy nomination for Best Rock Instrumental Performance in January 1993 - awarded to Stevie Ray Vaughan and Double Trouble for "Little Wing". Violinist Jerry Goodman, of The Mahavishnu Orchestra fame, filled in for Sloan, who was frequently absent as a result of his busy medical career. They signed a deal with former label Capricorn Records for their first studio album in years entitled Full Circle in 1994.

=== Today ===
The Dregs to this day remain a loose collection of its former members, reuniting briefly for short tours and rare studio work. 1997's releases were The Great Spectacular in April and King Biscuit Flower Hour Presents (originally recorded in 1979 for the King Biscuit radio show) in September. California Screamin' (2000) is a curious mix of live recordings from the performances at the Roxy Theatre in August 1999. This release features older compositions and covers of the Allman Brothers Band's "Jessica", and Frank Zappa's "Peaches en Regalia" (with Dweezil Zappa sharing guitar lead). 20th Century Masters: The Best of the Dixie Dregs and the DVD Sects, Dregs and Rock 'n' Roll were released in 2002.

On July 3, 2017, Rod Morgenstein announced a reunion tour beginning February 2018 in a YouTube video for Rock, Roots, & Blues - Live.

The first show of the reunion tour dubbed "Dawn of the Dregs" took place on February 28, 2018, in Clearwater, Florida. It featured the original lineup of Steve Morse (guitar), Andy West (bass), Rod Morgenstein (drums), Allen Sloan (violin), and Steve Davidowski (keyboards)

== Musical style ==
Performances consist entirely of instrumentals, with Industry Standard (1982) being the only album by the band to contain vocals. Members are noted for their virtuoso playing, and the band's music incorporates elements of many genres, which makes the sound difficult to classify; they have been categorized as a jazz rock, instrumental rock, progressive rock or southern rock band. The band's influences include The Allman Brothers Band and Mahavishnu Orchestra. The Boston Herald described the band's music as a fusion of rock, jazz, country, and classical music. Guitarist Morse has said, "“We rarely think of labels,” explained bandleader Steve Morse, “but if we did, it would be something like ‘electronic chamber music.’”

While the Chicago Tribune categorized their music as a fusion of jazz rock and country music, The Christian Science Monitor has defined it as a fusion of bluegrass and classical music. The Times described the Dregs music as a fusion of progressive rock, heartland rock, and jazz.

== Personnel ==
=== Members ===
Current members

- Steve Morse – guitar (1970–1983, 1988–present)
- Andy West – bass guitar (1970–1983, 1988, 1999, 2017–present)
- Rod Morgenstein – drums (1973–1983, 1988–present)
- Allen Sloan – violin (1973–1981, 1988–1992, 1999, 2017–present)
- Steve Davidowski – keyboards (1975–1977, 2017–present)

Former members

- Frank Brittingham – guitar, vocals (1970–1971)
- Dave Morse – drums (1970–1971)
- Johnny Carr – keyboards (1970)
- Mark Parrish – keyboards (1970–1971, 1973, 1977–1978)
- Bart Yarnold – drums (1973)
- Gilbert Frayer – drums (1973)
- Frank Josephs – keyboards (1974–1975)
- T Lavitz – keyboards (1978–1983, 1988–2010; his death)
- Mark O'Connor – violin (1981–1983)
- Dave LaRue – bass guitar (1988–2017)
- Jerry Goodman – violin (1992–2017)

Substitute musicians

- Jordan Rudess – keyboards (1994, 2024)

=== Lineups ===
1970 As "Dixie Grit"	1970–1971 As "Dixie Grit"	1971–1973	1973
Frank Brittingham - guitar, vocals; Johnny Carr - keyboards; Dave Morse - drums; Steve Morse - guitar; Andy West - bass guitar	Frank Brittingham - guitar, vocals; Dave Morse - drums; Steve Morse - guitar; Andy West - bass guitar; Mark Parrish - keyboards	Steve Morse - guitar; Andy West - bass guitar	As "Rock Ensemble II": Steve Morse - guitar; Andy West - bass guitar; Allen Sloan - violin; Bart Yarnall - drums; As "Dixie Dregs": Steve Morse - guitar; Andy West - bass guitar; Mark Parrish - keyboards; Gilbert Frayer - drums
1973–1974	1974–1975	1975–1977	1977–1978
Steve Morse - guitar; Andy West - bass guitar; Allen Sloan - violin; Rod Morgenstein - drums	Steve Morse - guitar; Andy West - bass guitar; Allen Sloan - violin; Rod Morgenstein - drums; Frank Josephs - keyboards	Steve Morse - guitar; Andy West - bass guitar; Allen Sloan - violin; Rod Morgenstein - drums; Steve Davidowski - keyboards	Steve Morse - guitar; Andy West - bass guitar; Allen Sloan - violin; Rod Morgenstein - drums; Mark Parrish - keyboards
1978–1981	1981–1983	1983–1988	1988–1992
Steve Morse - guitar; Andy West - bass guitar; Allen Sloan - violin; Rod Morgenstein - drums; T Lavitz - keyboards	Steve Morse - guitar; Andy West - bass guitar; Rod Morgenstein - drums; T Lavitz - keyboards; Mark O'Connor - violin	Group disbanded	Steve Morse - guitar; Rod Morgenstein - drums; T Lavitz - keyboards; Dave LaRue - bass guitar; Allen Sloan - violin
1992–2010	2010–2017	2017–present
Steve Morse - guitar; Rod Morgenstein - drums; T Lavitz - keyboards; Dave LaRue - bass guitar; Jerry Goodman - violin	Steve Morse - guitar; Rod Morgenstein - drums; Dave LaRue - bass guitar; Jerry Goodman - violin	Steve Morse - guitar; Andy West - bass; Allen Sloan - violin; Rod Morgenstein - drums; Steve Davidowski - keyboards

== Discography ==
=== Studio albums ===
- Free Fall (1977)
- What If (1978)
- Night of the Living Dregs (1979)
- Dregs of the Earth (1980)
- Unsung Heroes (1981)
- Industry Standard (1982)
- Full Circle (1994)

=== Demo releases ===
- The Great Spectacular (1976 - released on CD April 1997)
- Three song EP for promotional purposes. 100 copies pressed. Two different labels - red, and yellow
- Off the Record (1988) (demo for Ensoniq synthesizers)

=== Live albums ===
- Bring 'Em Back Alive (1992)
- King Biscuit Flower Hour Presents (September 16, 1997)
- California Screamin' (February 1, 2000)
- From the Front Row... Live! (Dolby 5.1 DVD-Audio, 2003)

=== Compilations ===
- Best of the Dixie Dregs (1987)
- The Best of the Dregs: Divided We Stand (1989)
- 20th Century Masters: The Best of the Dixie Dregs (March 26, 2002)

=== Video albums ===
- Sects, Dregs and Rock 'n' Roll (DVD, December 2002)
- Live at Montreux 1978 (DVD, 2005)

=== Singles ===
- 1976: "Cruise Control"/"Refried Funky Chicken"/"Cosmopolitan Traveler" (self-released)
- 1978: "Take It Off the Top"/"Little Kids"
- 1979: "Punk Sandwich"/"Country House Shuffle"
- 1980: "Pride O' the Farm"/"The Great Spectacular"
- 1981: "Cruise Control"/"Go for Baroque"
- 1982: "Crank It Up"/"Bloodsucking Leeches"
