= Cavo discography =

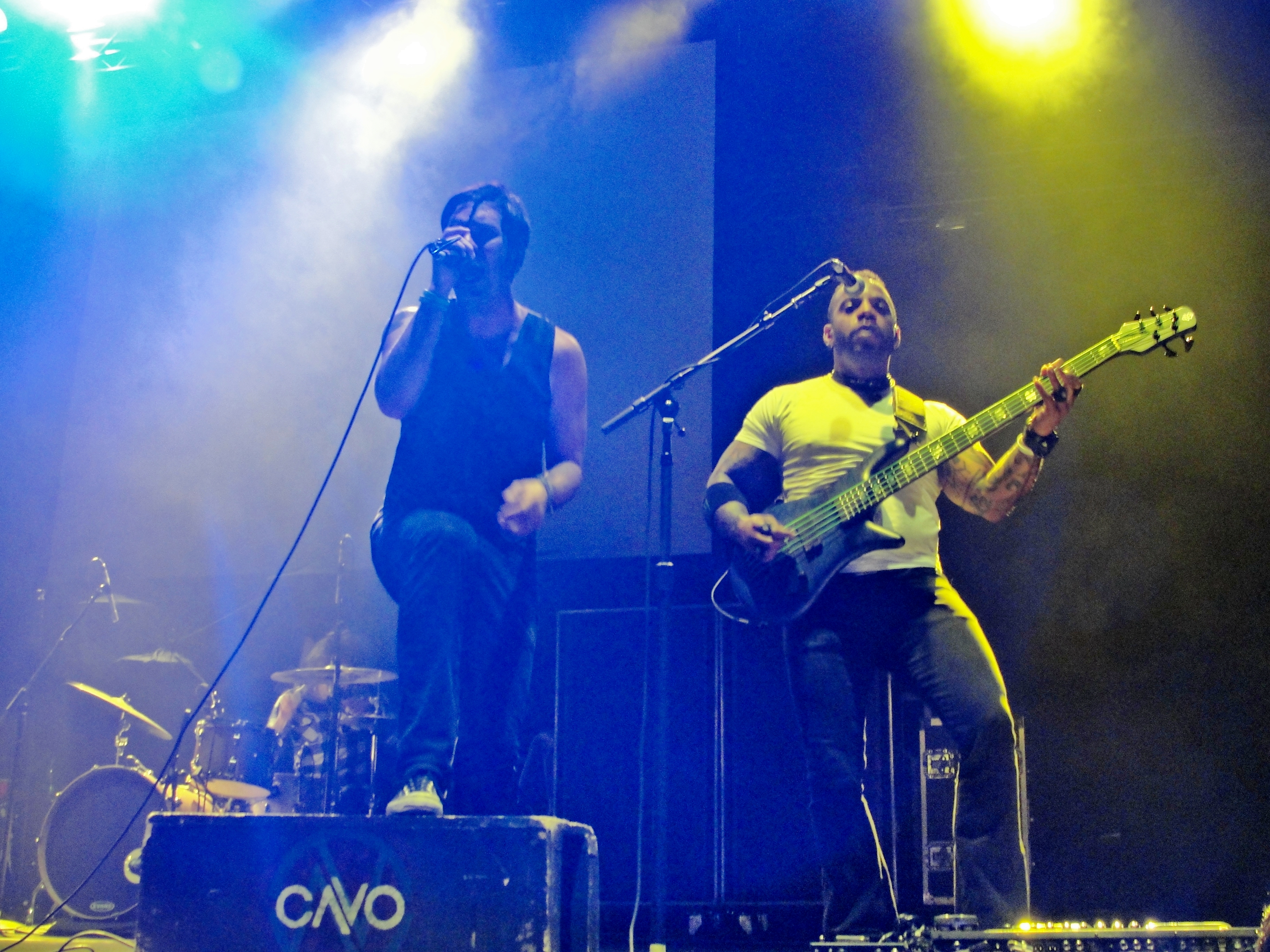
- Cavo performing at the Carnival of Madness tour in Laredo, Texas
- Studio albums: 4
- EPs: 5
- Singles: 8
- Music videos: 5

This is a comprehensive discography of official recordings by Cavo, an American hard rock band from St. Louis, Missouri. Cavo has released three studio albums, five extended plays, eight singles and five music videos.

== Albums ==
=== Studio albums ===
List of studio albums, with selected chart positions
Title	Album details	Peak chart positions			
Title	Album details	US	US Alt.	US Hard Rock	US Rock
The Painful Art of Letting Go	Released: September 2006; Label: Bullet 339; Formats: CD, digital download	—	—	—	—
Bright Nights Dark Days	Released: August 11, 2009; Label: Reprise; Formats: CD, digital download	47	10	3	13
Thick as Thieves	Released: April 10, 2012; Label: Eleven Seven; Formats: CD, digital download	96	21	10	34
Bridges	Released: January 29, 2016; Label: Cavo Music Experience; Formats: CD, digital download	—	—	—	—
"—" denotes a recording that did not chart or was not released in that territory.

=== Extended plays ===
List of extended plays
Title	Album details
A Space to Fill	Released: 2002; Label: Bullet 339; Formats: CD, digital download
Champagne EP	Released: 2008; Label: Bullet 339; Formats: CD, digital download
Crash EP	Released: 2010; Label: Reprise; Formats: Digital download
Let It Go: Acoustic EP	Released: 2010; Label: Reprise; Formats: Digital download
Sounds from the Hollow	Released: 2011; Label: Eleven Seven; Formats: Digital download
The Shakes EP	Released: December 2022; Label: Sawhorse Studios; Formats: Digital download

== Singles ==
List of singles, with selected chart positions, showing year released and album name
Title	Year	Peak chart positions					Album
Title	Year	US	US Adult	US Alt.	US Main. Rock	US Rock	Album
"Champagne"	2008	— (Note: "Champagne" did not enter the Billboard Hot 100, but peaked at number nine on the Bubbling Under Hot 100 Singles chart.)	—	22	1	8	Bright Nights Dark Days
"Crash"	2009	—	—	40	6	20	Bright Nights Dark Days
"Let It Go"	2010	—	28	—	—	—	Bright Nights Dark Days
"My Little Secret"	2010	—	—	—	—	—	Bright Nights Dark Days
"Blame"	2010	—	—	—	—	—	Bright Nights Dark Days
"Cry Wolf"	2010	—	—	—	—	—	Bright Nights Dark Days
"Thick as Thieves"	2011	—	—	—	22	—	Thick as Thieves
"Celebrity"	2012	—	—	—	—	—	Thick as Thieves
"Circles"	2012	—	—	—	—	—	Thick as Thieves
"War Within"	2013	—	—	—	—	—	Thick as Thieves
"California"	2013	—	—	—	—	—	Thick as Thieves
"Stay"	2015	—	—	—	—	—	Bridges
"Just Like We Want It"	2015	—	—	—	—	—	Bridges
"Cynical"	2016	—	—	—	—	—	Bridges
"On Your Own"	2016	—	—	—	—	—	Bridges
"Take Me Home"	2016	—	—	—	—	—	Bridges
"Wolves"	2019	—	—	—	—	—	Bridges, Bright Nights and Thieves
"Without You"	2020	—	—	—	—	—	Bridges, Bright Nights and Thieves
"What Does It Feel Like"	2020	—	—	—	—	—	Bridges, Bright Nights and Thieves
"Muscle Memory"	2020	—	—	—	—	—	Bridges, Bright Nights and Thieves
"Lead On"	2020	—	—	—	—	—	Bridges, Bright Nights and Thieves
"Come Undone" (featuring Shannon Roc)	2021	—	—	—	—	—	Bridges, Bright Nights and Thieves
"Not Over You"	2022	—	—	—	—	—	The Shakes
"Synchronicity II"	2022	—	—	—	—	—	Covers Vol. 1
"Dizzy"	2023	—	—	—	—	—	The Shakes
"Drive"	2023	—	—	—	—	—	Covers Vol. 1
"The Shakes"	2023	—	—	—	—	—	The Shakes
"Bizarre Love Triangle"	2023	—	—	—	—	—	Covers Vol. 1
"Comes Back On"	2023	—	—	—	—	—	The Shakes
"Don't Dream It's Over"	2023	—	—	—	—	—	Covers Vol. 1
"Feels the Same"	2023	—	—	—	—	—	The Shakes
"—" denotes a recording that did not chart or was not released in that territory.

== Music videos ==
List of music videos, showing year released and director
Title	Year	Director(s)
"Champagne"	2009	ZFCL
"Beautiful"	2009	ZF Films
"Crash"	2009	—N/a
"Let It Go"	2010	—N/a
"Thick as Thieves"	2011	Frankie Nasso
"Celebrity"	2012	—N/a
"Just Like We Want It"	2017	J.T. Ibanez
"Wolves"	2019	J.T. Ibanez
"Without You"	2020	J.T. Ibanez
"What Does It Feel Like"	2020	J.T. Ibanez
"Muscle Memory"	2020	J.T. Ibanez
"Lead On"	2020	J.T. Ibanez
"Come Undone"	2021	J.T. Ibanez
"Not Over You"	2022	J.T. Ibanez
"Dizzy"	2023	J.T. Ibanez
"Drive"	2023	J.T. Ibanez
"Comes Back On"	2023	Brian Pookee Jones Smith
"Don't Dream It's Over"	2023	Brian Pookee Jones Smith
