= Angelfire (disambiguation) =

Angelfire is an Internet service.

Angelfire or Angel Fire may also refer to:

== Literature ==
- Angelfire (novel series), by Courtney Allison Moulton
- Angel Fire (Miscione novel), by Lisa Miscione

== Music ==
- Angelfire (band)
- Angelfire (album), by the group of the same name
- "Angel Fire", a track from Dolores O'Riordan's album Are You Listening?
- "Angelfire", a bonus track from the 2016 Lemon Demon album Spirit Phone

== Places ==
- Angel Fire, New Mexico
- Angel Fire Resort, ski venue
