= Second Flight: Live at the Z7 =

Second Flight – Live at the Z7

Live album by Flying Colors
- Released: November 13, 2015
- Recorded: October 12, 2014
- Venue: Z7 (Pratteln CH)
- Genre: Progressive Rock
- Length: 100:53
- Label: Mascot Label Group

Flying Colors chronology
Second Nature (2014)	Second Flight – Live at the Z7 (2015)

Second Flight: Live at the Z7 is the second live album by American progressive rock supergroup Flying Colors. The band recorded it on October 12, 2014 at the Z7 Konzertfabrik in Pratteln, Switzerland. Mike Portnoy chose the location because both Flying Colors and other bands of his had recorded multiple shows at the 013 in Tilburg. It was a challenging show for the band to perform because this was only the eighth show on the tour. The album title was coined by Portnoy.

Bernhard Baran, who had filmed and edited Flying Colors' Live in Europe, returned to undertake this production. Executive producer Bill Evans requested a larger production than the previous release, resulting in 24 cameras being used; most of them being GoPro cameras attached to band members' instruments.

The band used new audio and video technology on this release. Evans and his assistant engineer, Tom Price, developed and employed new technology that had never been used for live concert release, in conjunction with mix engineer Rich Mouser. Critics place it among the best-sounding live albums ever made.

One feature allowed the viewer to move between the two different locations in the venue which he felt had the best sound: the front row, and behind the front-of-house console. Z7 Konzertfabrik supplied blueprints for the venue; Evans and mix engineer Rich Mouser (who had run front-of-house sound for the show) designed two surround mixes to simulate both listening positions. The audio setup menu on the DVD and Blu-ray versions showed the Z7 blueprint, and displayed the listener's current position.

Another feature was a mix created specifically for headphones. Originally, this was to be the front-row surround mix. However, the results were not satisfactory. Evans and Price then worked with Mouser to create a 3D audio headphone mix wherein each sound source was uniquely positioned in a virtual 3D field around the listener. Price noted that this type of mix was significant because an increasing number of people listened to music on headphones, instead of speakers. The mix was not complete at release time for the main album.

The final feature was a new mixing technology, Harmonic Phrase Analysis. Developed as part of Evans' PhD, the technology "…reduces the unwanted processing normally associated with contemporary live recordings, imparting a more organic feel to the sound field." Evans spent six months, full-time, with Price, developing the technology, and applying it to all the tracks of Second Flight: Live at the Z7. Mouser spent 34 days creating four separate mixes and 10 separate masters, and then mastered each recording.

Three live music videos were released at 4K resolution: “Mask Machine”, "Kayla", and "Bombs Away."

== Track listing ==
1. "Overture"
2. "Open Up Your Eyes"
3. "Bombs Away"
4. "Kayla"
5. "Shoulda Coulda Woulda"
6. "The Fury of My Love"
7. "A Place in Your World"
8. "Forever in a Daze"
9. "One Love Forever"
10. "Colder Months"
11. "Peaceful Harbor"
12. "The Storm"
13. "Cosmic Symphony"
14. "Mask Machine"
15. "Infinite Fire"
16. "Peaceful Harbor" (Orchestral Version)*

== Credits ==
- Vocals, Guitar: Casey McPherson
- Keyboards, Vocals, Guitar: Neal Morse
- Lead Guitar: Steve Morse
- Bass: Dave LaRue
- Drums, Vocals, Percussion: Mike Portnoy
- Cover, Layout: Roy Koch & Thomas Van Der Kooi
- Engineer [Additional]: Jerry Guidroz
- Engineer [Assistant Mix]: Jeff Fox
- Engineer [Assistant Production]: Tom Price
- Engineer [Audio Production]: Bill Evans
- Engineer [Location Recording]: Arne Lakenmacher
- Executive Producer: Bill Evans
- Mixed and Mastered By: Rich Mouser
- Photography By: Christophe Pauly & Victor Peters
