= Casey McPherson =

American singer-songwriter (born 1978)

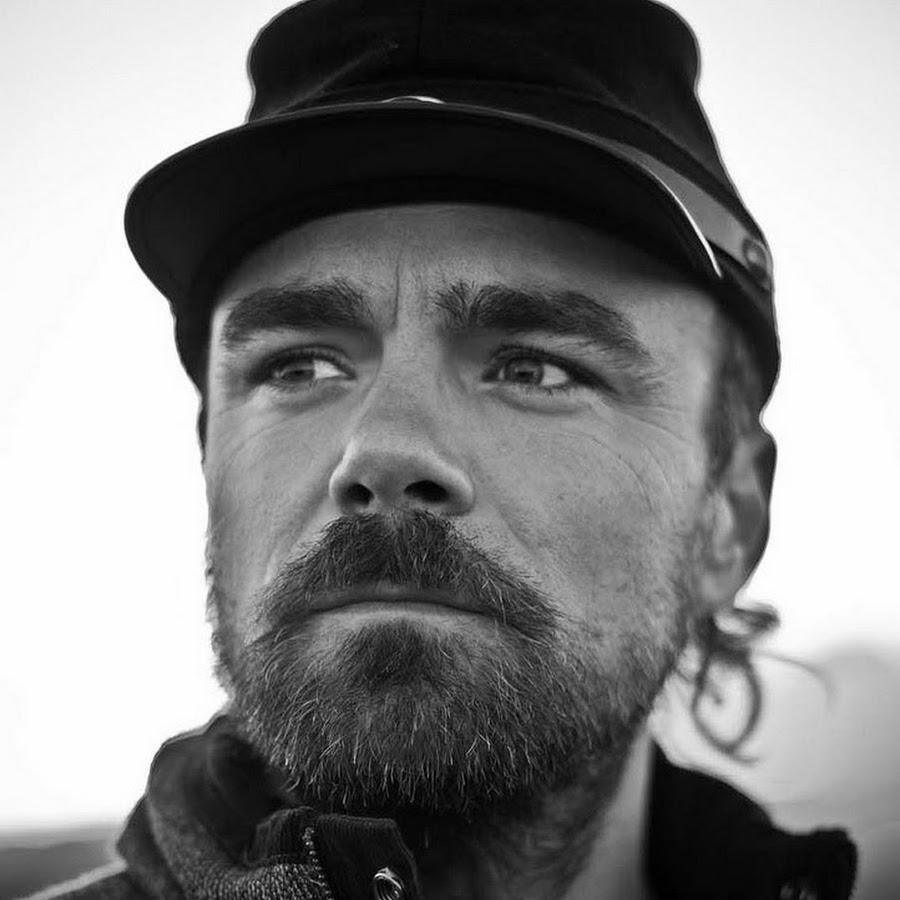

Background information
- Born: September 15, 1978 (age 47)
- Occupations: Entrepreneur; singer-songwriter; musician
- Instruments: Vocals; guitar; keyboards
- Labels: Hollywood Records; Sea Change Records; Flyer Records
- Member of: Alpha Rev; Flying Colors; Endochine; The Sea Within

Casey McPherson (born September 15, 1978) is a singer and songwriter based in Austin, Texas where he lives with his two daughters. He is currently the frontman of the bands Alpha Rev and Flying Colors, as well as his own solo career. He is a classically-trained pianist and guitarist.

== Personal life ==
Casey grew up in Lake Jackson, Texas. He was home schooled by his mother, and spent much of his childhood outdoors exploring nature. At a young age, he lost both his father and brother to suicide. He went on to dedicate over a decade of service to helping others face mental health and prevent suicide by sitting on the boards of prestigious mental health organizations. He became an outspoken voice to raise awareness and money for the cause.

He currently lives in Austin, Texas, with his two daughters, Weston and Rose. In response to learning that his youngest daughter, Rose, had a rare genetic disease, he founded and runs the To Cure a Rose Foundation and is in the process of founding the N-of-1 Fund.

Casey is the music director at Riverbend in Austin. He is a firm believer in Internal Family Systems as an effective therapy for individuals, children and families. Since 2009, he has successfully invested in a number of Real Estate ventures.

== Music career ==
Casey is a singer and songwriter based in Austin, Texas. He is currently the frontman of the bands Alpha Rev and Flying Colors, as well as his own Casey McPherson. He has toured the world, filling music venues and stadiums in over 15 countries. He is a classically-trained pianist and guitarist.

Casey started his career in his twenties when he formed the band Endochine. After the breakup of Endochine, Casey went on to start Alpha Rev in 2005 which was ranked the #1 indie band in Texas, and the #16 indie band nationwide.

In 2010 Alpha Rev topped the charts with New Morning reaching #3 on radio, and their video made the Top 10 on VH1. They were also featured as one of VH1's "You Oughta Know, Artist on the Rise."

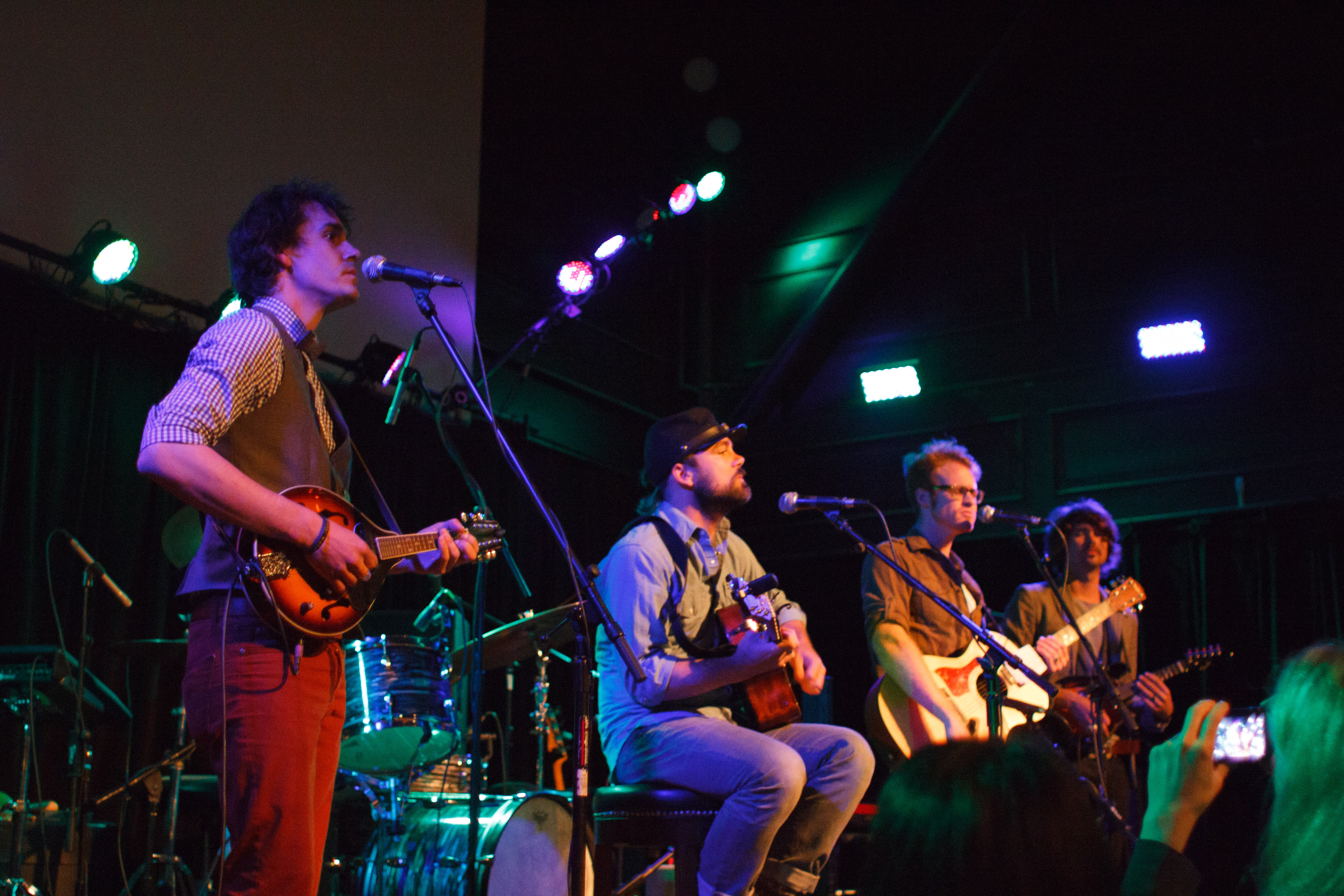
Alpha Rev playing at the Old Rock House in St. Louis in 2013

In 2011 he was invited to be lead singer and songwriter for Flying Colors, a supergroup with Dream Theater drummer Mike Portnoy, guitarist Steve Morse and bassist Dave LaRue of the Dixie Dregs, and keyboardist Neal Morse, formerly of Spock's Beard. The group has released three studio albums, and three live albums, to commercial success and critical acclaim.

Casey also launched an app for musicians and performers called SkaFlash, a software program designed to more easily connect fans to the bands and performers they follow.

== Philanthropy ==
=== Mental health ===
By the age of twenty-three, Casey had lost both his father and brother to suicide. After mourning their deaths, he dedicated over a decade to help others face mental health and prevent suicide. He joined the boards of Mental Health Texas and Austin Child Guidance Center, where he worked on policy change and mental health advocacy. He became an outspoken voice to raise awareness and over $1 million for the cause.

=== Rare diseases ===
In 2018, Casey's youngest daughter Rose was diagnosed with a rare genetic disease, HNRNPH2. He is currently working in the scientific field to bring genetic treatments to children across rare diseases. He founded and runs the non-profit, To Cure a Rose Foundation, and is in the process of launching the N-of-1 Fund, a sustainable model to drive rare disease treatments forward.

He is an advocate of the sound-health connection, using music to engage the brain to improve communication and motor function in children with rare neurological diseases like his daughter Rose.

== Discography ==
With Endochine

- i (2001)
- Day Two (2004)

With Alpha Rev

- Alpha Rev (2006)
- The Greatest Thing I've Ever Learned (2007)
- New Morning (2010)
- City Farm: Roots (2011)
- Bloom (2013)
- Case.E Sessions Volume 1 (2018)
- (I Wish You Were) Open (2020)

With Flying Colors

- Flying Colors (2012)
- Live in Europe (2013)
- Second Nature (2014)
- Second Flight: Live at the Z7 (2015)
- Third Degree (2019)
- Morsefest 2019 (2019)
- Third Stage: Live In London (2020)

With The Sea Within

- The Sea Within (2018) (album guest and live musician)
