= Matt Noveskey =

American musician (born 1976)

- Born: June 16, 1976 (age 50)
- Genre: Rock
- Occupation: Musician
- Instruments: Vocals, guitar, bass guitar
- Member of: Blue October, Harvard of the South, Icarus Bell, The Joy Thieves
- Formerly of: Love Muscle, Terra Firma, Eat Some Tuna, Switch, Toast, Botfly, Alpha Rev, Paco Estrada, The Meeting Place

William Matthew Noveskey (born June 16, 1976) is an American singer, songwriter, record producer, guitarist, and bassist, best known as the bassist in the bands Blue October and Harvard of the South, and as bassist and frontman of the bands (a+)machines and Icarus Bell. He has also played bass in the bands Alpha Rev and Joy Thieves as well as Paco Estrada's backing band and Ryan Delahoussaye's band The Meeting Place.

== Early life and education ==
William Matthew Noveskey was born on June 16, 1976 in Adrian, Michigan. Noveskey moved from Adrian to Traverse City at the age of ten. He grew up in a very musical household in Northern Michigan. He had two uncles who both played bass guitar and sang in touring rock bands, his brother plays drums, and his grandparents played guitar, piano and accordion. Inspired by his uncle Jim Noveskey, Matt started playing bass at age eleven and has been playing in bands since he was a teenager. Matt has said that he was interested in playing both drums and guitar, and that playing bass sort of allowed him to do both at the same time. His first band was called Love Muscle and he also played in the bands Terra Firma, Eat Some Tuna, and Toast, the latter of which included his brother, Dave Irish, on drums. His early musical influences were bassists Geddy Lee, James Jamerson, Larry Graham, Eric Avery and Flea.

Noveskey graduated from Saint Francis High School in Traverse City in 1994. He attended college at University of Michigan in Ann Arbor and Western Michigan University in Kalamazoo, first majoring in English, and later in elementary education. He bartended while playing weekend shows with a variety of local acts, including the bands Switch and Botfly. Acting on a tip from his booking agent, in late 1998 he successfully auditioned for Blue October and moved to San Marcos, Texas. His first full show with Blue October was at Satellite Lounge in Houston, Texas on February 12, 1999.

== Blue October ==
Noveskey joined Blue October in 1998 after the departure of the group's original bassist, Liz Mullally. Noveskey played guitar, bass and sang backing vocals on Blue October's 2000 major label debut Consent to Treatment. He also created the artwork for the album and along with Justin Furstenfeld, co-wrote the single "James" and the live fan-favorite "You Make Me Smile."

Noveskey toured extensively with Blue October in support of Consent to Treatment. He stayed with the band even after they were dropped from Universal Records, but left for health reasons at the end of the tour in late 2002. Blue October re-signed with Universal for the release of 2003's History for Sale on which Noveskey contributed. Matt eventually fully rejoined Blue October in late 2004. During his absence, Blue October never played the Noveskey-penned "You Make Me Smile" during a concert. The song was included as the opening track on the band's 2006 platinum album Foiled and is now a live staple.

After the departure of Blue October's lead guitarist, C.B. Hudson, in 2010, Noveskey temporarily took over guitar duty during performances until the band hired Julian Mandrake as a full-time lead guitarist.

== (a+)machines ==
During his absence from Blue October, Noveskey formed a second band with Blue October's drum technician Alan Adams, who had previously been the drummer for the bands Falling Jupiter and Flywater Washington. The new band, (a+)machines, also includes Ryan Holley and Chris Lynch. Noveskey is the primary singer and lyricist in the band, which have recorded a 5-track EP and a live album. The band actively toured during 2004 and 2005 with such acts as Canvas, SouthFM, 7 Mary 3, Vallejo and the Burden Brothers, and even opened for Blue October. They also played an official showcase at SXSW in 2005. The group have been on hiatus while Noveskey and Adams tour with Blue October. (a+)machines has periodically reunited to play live concerts. Their most recent show was October 27, 2018 in Austin.

== Icarus Bell ==
In 2019 Matt started working with Alan Adams on a new musical project called Icarus Bell. With the COVID-19 pandemic sidelining Blue October's tour plans, Matt was able to devote more focus to Icarus Bell. The duo began recording their debut album in 2020, which features contributions from Paco Estrada, Scott Graham, Ron "Bumblefoot" Thal, Lukas Rossi, Kelsey Flanagan, Justin Furstenfeld, Will Knaak and Ryan Delahoussaye, among others. Icarus Bell released their debut single "Aces" in December 2020. In June 2021 Icarus Bell's music video for their song "Vultures" received a bronze Addy award from the Austin chapter of the American Advertising Federation. Icarus bell released their debut album The Great Collapse on January 5, 2024. Icarus Bell played their first concerts in October 2024, as opening act on a string of shows with The Unlikely Candidates.

== Other music projects ==
While not touring and recording with his bands, Noveskey lends his services as a bassist, songwriter, vocalist and record producer for other recording artists in a variety of musical genres. Noveskey started producing other artists in 2006, and in January 2008 he formed a production company called 116 Producers with producer/engineer Chuck Alkazian. The duo mainly worked out of Detroit and Austin. Several of the artists Noveskey produced have signed to major labels, won awards, achieved chart success and had their songs placed in movies and television shows. Songs Noveskey has produced or co-written have charted at #1 on iTunes independent, #1 on iHeartRadio, Top 10 iTunes pop, Top 20 iTunes overall, Top 30 Alternative, Top 40 Adult Contemporary, and Top 30 Hot Country Songs.

In addition to producing, Noveskey is the proprietor of Wanderlust Artist Management and Promotion, a company that manages and promotes the artists he produces. His roster has included the bands I Am Dynamite, Dossey, Courrier and Nolo. Matt also managed Dalton Rapattoni who finished third on American Idol, and he also produced Rapattoni's debut solo album Nobody's Home. In 2012 Noveskey along with Blue October's guitarist C.B. Hudson, broke ground on Orb Recording Studios, a world class residential recording studio in Austin, which opened in 2013. In 2014 Orb Studios was selected as Austin's best recording studio in the Austin Music Industry Awards.

Noveskey also tours as a solo artist, often sharing the stage with friends and bandmates such as Justin Furstenfeld, Joseph King, Jeff Crowder, Wesley Lunsford, Ryan Holley, Casey McPherson, Paco Estrada and Johnny Goudie. Matt's solo sets contain a mix of his solo songs, (a+)machines songs, Blue October songs and covers. He is often accompanied by his (a+)machines bandmate Ryan Holley.

In 2014, Noveskey joined the band Harvard of the South with Steve Schiltz of Longwave and Justin and Jeremy Furstenfeld of Blue October. Harvard of the South released their long-awaited debut album in December 2020. Matt has also toured and played shows as a live member of The Paco Estrada Band, Megan Becker Band, and Alpha Rev. He produced and played bass on Paco Estrada's album Bedtime Stories and also played bass on Estrada's live album Dancing With The Devil, both of which were recorded at Noveskey's Orb Studios. Matt also plays bass in the Ryan Delahoussaye-fronted side project The Meeting Place.

Noveskey is a celebrity endorser of Fender basses, Aguilar bass amps, Michael Kelly acoustic basses, Old School FX pedals and Black Diamond strings, and the first Moniker bass guitar was custom-built for Noveskey in 2013. He also is a member of the advisory board for Black Fret, an Austin-based organization that finds and funds local music talent.

In 2019 Noveskey became a member of industrial/punk/hard rock supergroup The Joy Thieves.

In 2021 Premiere Career Guidance (PCG), a Nashville-based artist development company, announced their expansion into the Austin market, and the appointment of Matt Noveskey as head of their Austin division. In 2022 Noveskey was added to the roster of Los Angeles-based Waldman Management as a producer/songwriter. In April 2022 Noveskey formed a new artist management company, Daisy Bone, LLC.

== Discography ==
With Blue October

- Consent to Treatment (2000)
- History for Sale (2003)
- Foiled (2006)
- Teach Your Baby Well Live (2007)
- Approaching Normal (2009)
- Ugly Side: An Acoustic Evening With Blue October (2011)
- Any Man in America (2011)
- Sway (2013)
- Things We Do at Night (Live from Texas) (2015)
- Home (2016)
- I Hope You're Happy (2018)
- Live from Manchester (2019)
- This Is What I Live For (2020)
- Spinning the Truth Around (Part 1) (2022)
- Spinning the Truth Around (Part 2) (2023)

With (a+)machines

- (a+)machines EP (2004)
- Live @ Momo's (2006)

With Harvard of the South

- Miracle EP (2014)
- Harvard of the South LP (2020)

With Icarus Bell

- The Great Collapse (2024)

== Producer discography ==
- Five Dollar Friend - XOXORx (Kisses, Hugs, and Prescription Drugs) (2006)
- Darby - The Clearing (2007)
- Dawn Over Zero - Catapult (2007)
- Wesley Lunsford (& The Selfless Season) - The Mixlab Demonstration (2007)
- I Am Dynamite - Mahoney (2008)
- Emphatic - Goodbye Girl (2009)
- Language Room - One By One (2009)
- Courrier - A Violent Flame (2010)
- Deep Ella - You. me. and the Spider (2010)
- Gravity - Gravity (2010)
- Language Room - Language Room (2010)
- Wesley Lunsford (& The Selfless Season) - The Selfless Season (2010)
- 23 Shades - A New Day to Learn (2011)
- Booth - Booth (2011)
- Brannigan - Lucky Sound (2011)
- Giants in the Earth - The Drug II (2011)
- Jesse Felder - What's Underneath (2011)
- I Am Dynamite - SuperMegaFantastic (2011)
- Manna - Chronic Hives (2011)
- The Aaron Clift Experiment - Lonely Hills (2012)
- Courrier - Love is a Fire (2012)
- Little Brave - Wild (2012)
- Moonlight Social - Heading South (2012)
- Penni - Eleven Stories Down (2012)
- Snake Skin Prison - Smokin Whiskey (2012)
- The Strive - Design the Road (2012)
- Cody Bryan Band - Wreck Me (2013)
- Edison Chair - Edison Chair (2013)
- Joshua Radin - Wax Wings (2013)
- Reed Turner - Ghosts in the Attic (2013)
- Swimming With Bears - Paw (2013)
- Tori Vasquez - Wear You Thin (2013)
- Waterloo Revival- (ep) (2013)
- Wesley Lunsford (& The Selfless Season) - Wesley Lunsford (2013)
- TheLastPlaceYouLook - TheLastPlaceYouLook (2013)
- Vinyl Pilot - A Beautiful Disaster (2013)
- KIONA - Midnight Holiday (2014)
- Piqued Jacks - No Bazooka (2014)
- Piqued Jacks - Upturned Perspectives (2014)
- The Aaron Clift Experiment - Outer Light, Inner Darkness (2015)
- Quiet Company - Transgressor (2015)
- Paco Estrada - Bedtime Stories (2015)
- Tori Vasquez - [new album] (2015)
- I Am Dynamite - Wasa Tusa (2015)
- Reed Turner - Native Tongue (2015)
- Cody Bryan Band - Small Town Noise (2015)
- Fly Away Hero - Lost and Found (2015)
- Alpha Rev - (ep) (2015)
- Daryll "DMC' McDaniels - [new album] (2016)
- Cavo - Bridges (2016)
- Ivory Tribes - Jungles (2016)
- Soapbox Revolution - (ep) (2016)
- Nomad City - (ep) (2016)
- Central Coast - Light-Footed Hours (2016)
- Jibe - Epic Tales of Human Nature (2017)
- Dalton Rapattoni - Nobody's Home (2017)
- Tje Austin - I Belong to You (2017)
- Nakayla - Queen of Hearts (2018)
- Adri Lavigne - Take Me Home (2019)
- Hold on Hollywood - Love Stories (2020)
- Big Story - BEAZT (2020)
- James Mackenzie - The Honeymoon (2020)
- Elijah Delgado - Grow (2020)
- Lia Catallo - In My Fantasies (2020)
- Dossey - Animal (2021)
- Ellie Reed - Sunsets and Silver Linings (2021)
- In The Trench - Nightmares EP (2021)
- Kate Angel - Venom (2023)
- Elle Townley - Fairweather Friend (2023)
- Mad Valley - Mad Valley (2023)
- hypr clr. - I haven’t left the house in days (2023)
