= Thick as Thieves =

Thick as Thieves may refer to:

== Film ==
- Thick as Thieves, a 1971 TV film starring Corin Redgrave and Leonard Rossiter
- Thick as Thieves (1999 film), a film directed by Scott Sanders
- Thick as Thieves (2009 film), a film directed by Mimi Leder and starring Morgan Freeman

== Literature ==
- Thick as Thieves (Spiegelman novel), a 2011 novel by Peter Spiegelman
- Thick as Thieves (Turner novel), a 2017 novel by Megan Whalen Turner
- Thick as Thieves, a 1989 Hardy Boys Casefiles novel
- Thick as Thieves, a 1985 novel by Marie Ferrarella

== Music ==
=== Albums ===
- Thick as Thieves (Cavo album) or the title song (see below), 2012
- Thick as Thieves (The Temper Trap album) or the title song, 2016
- Thick as Thieves (Trooper album), 1978
- Thick as Thieves, by Kicked in the Head, 2000

=== Songs ===
- "Thick as Thieves" (song), by Cavo, 2011
- "Thick as Thieves", by Bon Jovi from What About Now, 2013
- "Thick as Thieves", by Dashboard Confessional from The Shade of Poison Trees, 2007
- "Thick as Thieves", by the Jam from Setting Sons, 1979
- "Thick as Thieves", by Kasabian from West Ryder Pauper Lunatic Asylum, 2009
- "Thick as Thieves", by Natalie Merchant from Ophelia, 1998
- "Thick as Thieves", by the Others from Inward Parts, 2006
- "Thick as Thieves", by Peter Wolf from Come as You Are, 1987
- "Thick as Thieves", by Shinedown from Threat to Survival, 2015
- "Thick as Thieves", by Short Stack from Shimmy a Go Go, 2008
- "Thick as Thieves", by the Summer Set from Everything's Fine, 2011

== Television ==
- Thick as Thieves (TV series), a 1974 British sitcom

=== Episodes ===
- "Thick as Thieves" (Benson), 1980
- "Thick as Thieves" (Cold Case), 2007
- "Thick as Thieves" (Highlander: The Raven), 1999
- "Thick as Thieves", a 2003 episode of All About Me
- "Thick as Thieves", a 2004 episode of Born and Bred

== See also ==
- "(You & Me) As Thick as Thieves", a song by Bang! Bang! Eche!
