= Live in Europe (Flying Colors album) =

Live album by Flying Colors
- Released: 15 October 2013
- Recorded: 20 September 2012
- Venue: 013 (Tilburg NL)
- Genre: Progressive Rock
- Length: 100:15
- Label: Mascot Label Group

Flying Colors chronology
Flying Colors (2012)	Live in Europe (2013)	''Second Nature (2014)

Live in Europe is the second release from prog/rock supergroup, Flying Colors. It was recorded on 20 September 2012, during the band's first tour, at the 013 in Tilburg, Netherlands. It was the 12th show the band had ever played. Mascot Label Group released the album on Blu-ray, DVD, 3-LP vinyl, 2-CD, Mastered for iTunes, and MP3 digital download. The Blu-ray and DVD versions included stereo and 5.1 surround mixes, and a 45-minute documentary, First Flight, edited by Randy George. Live in Europe debuted at No. 1 on the French national charts.

Three live videos were released by Mascot Label Group: "Odyssey", "The Storm", and "All Falls Down". The third vinyl disk contained a hidden track, "Space Trucking", which was recorded during an impromptu encore which closed the show; the band has never before or since performed the song.

The band performed the entire first album, and five cover songs from individual band members: "Can't Find a Way" (Endochine), "Odyssey" (Dixie Dregs), "June" (Spock's Beard), "Repentance" (Dream Theater), and "Space Trucking" (Deep Purple). Additionally, Casey began singing Leonard Cohen's "Hallelujah" about halfway through the tour, after Mike Portnoy heard him singing it during soundcheck. As a prelude to "Repentance", Dave LaRue plays a short bass solo, "Spur of the Moment", which is the only Flying Colors piece credited to one songwriter.

== Track listing ==
No.	Title	Writer(s)	Length
1.	"Blue Ocean"	Flying Colors	7:28
2.	"Shoulda Coulda Woulda"	Flying Colors	6:05
3.	"Love Is What I'm Waiting For"	Dwight A. Baker, Flying Colors	5:21
4.	"Can't Find A Way"	Casey McPherson	6:02
5.	"The Storm"	Flying Colors	6:02
6.	"Odyssey"	Steve Morse	6:52
7.	"Forever In A Daze"	Flying Colors	4:28
8.	"Hallelujah"	Leonard Cohen	5:18
9.	"Better Than Walking Away"	Flying Colors	5:01
10.	"Kayla"	Flying Colors	7:04
11.	"Fool In My Heart"	Flying Colors	3:46
12.	"Spur Of The Moment"	Dave LaRue	1:26
13.	"Repentance"	James LaBrie, John Myung, John Petrucci, Jordan Rudess, Mike Portnoy	5:06
14.	"June"	Neal Morse	5:58
15.	"All Falls Down"	Flying Colors	3:54
16.	"Everything Changes"	Flying Colors	8:04
17.	"Infinite Fire"	Flying Colors	12:16
18.	"Space Truckin'"	Ian Gillan, Ritchie Blackmore, Roger Glover, Jon Lord, Ian Paice	5:07
Total length:			1:45:17

== Personnel ==
Flying Colors

- Casey McPherson – lead vocals, guitar
- Neal Morse – vocals, keyboards
- Mike Portnoy – drums, vocals
- Steve Morse – lead guitar, backing vocals
- Dave LaRue – bass guitar

Production

- Executive Producer & Audio Post Production by Bill Evans
- Directed and Edited by Bernhard Baran / b-light-pictures
- Mixed by Jerry Guidroz
- Lighting Design by Yenz Nyholm
- Camera Crew: Rüdiger Jonitz, Bernhard Baran, Yannick Becker, Manuel Theobald, Dirk Meissner, Jochen Fink, Philipp Neuer, Karl Henssler
- Recording Engineer: Felix Walch
- Tour Manager: Lothar Strunk
- Assistant Tour Manager & Merchandise: Chris Thompson
- Front of House: Jerry Guidroz
- Guitar and bass technician: Tommy Alderson
- Drum technician: Jose Baraquio
- Keyboard technician: Bill Evans
- Layout & Design: Roy Koch
- Cover Artists & Photo Editing: Bill Evans, Roy Koch, Dick Truxaw, Stephen van Baalen
- Blu-ray & DVD authoring: Digital Pictures Media Masters bv.
- Title graphics and animation: Marc Papeghin
- Quality control: Kerstin Susewind
- Orchestral arrangement of "Everything Changes": Michal Mierzejewski
- Band management: Bill Evans
