= Language Room =

American indie/alternative rock band

- Origin: Austin, Texas, USA
- Genres: Alternative rock Indie rock
- Years active: 2007–present
- Label: Independent
- Members: Todd Sapio; Scott Graham; Matt Graham; Sean Hill
- Past members: Caleb Kelly
- Website: languageroomband.com

Language Room is an American indie/alternative rock band based in Austin, Texas. Its members are Todd Sapio (song writer, lead vocals, guitar), Scott Graham (lead guitar, backup vocals), Matt Graham (bass guitar, backup vocals), and Sean Hill (drums). In 2014 the band changed its name to KIONA.

== History ==
Sapio and Scott Graham originally met in Los Angeles, CA, where they were each pursuing careers as professional musicians. After little progress and hard luck, both became frustrated with the music scene in LA. Unbeknownst to the other, both Sapio and Graham decided to change directions by relocating to Austin. After a chance encounter during the 2007 South by Southwest conference, the two reunited and began collaborating. Scott then invited his brother Matt Graham to join the group on bass guitar. Shortly before an important gig, the group's drummer canceled. Caleb Kelly stepped in to cover the performance and subsequently became a permanent member.

In 2008, the quartet won a local battle of the bands competition and used the money to record and release a three-song EP. Shortly after its completion, Sapio met Blue October bassist Matt Noveskey in a guitar shop in south Austin. Noveskey, also a producer when not playing with Blue October, liked what he heard and expressed interest in doing a full-length album with Language Room. After successfully scraping together enough loans for the recording sessions, the group released its debut album One By One in February 2009. Based on the strength of this album, Language Room signed with both G&G Entertainment and Pazzo Music. Later in 2009, the band, experimenting with new revenue streams, raised $10,000 on crowd funding platform Kickstarter, which was relatively new at the time, to purchase an RV and fund a tour. News publication The Austin Chronicle recognized Language Room as the first entity from the Austin area to successfully complete a Kickstarter campaign, kicking off a string of successes for the town generally known for its artistic and technological leanings.

On August 10, 2010, the band released Language Room, its record label debut. A majority of the tracks were originally on One By One and were reworked and remixed for the Pazzo release. Two new tracks were written and added: "Quiet Eyes" and "Frantic".

In July 2011, Kelly amicably left the band to pursue other projects. Sean Hill then joined the group on drums.

In December 2011, after a second successful Kickstarter campaign, the foursome went into the studio with producer Dwight Baker (Kelly Clarkson, Bob Schneider, Alpha Rev, Dixie Chicks) to record new material. The result was an E.P. entitled Skin & Heart & Lungs, released on January 3, 2012.

The group recorded their second full-length album, Midnight Holiday with Matt Noveskey producing the sessions. The album was released in February 2014.

== Discography ==
- E.P. (2008, produced by Derek Jones)
- One By One (2009, produced by Matt Noveskey)
- Language Room (2010, Pazzo Music, produced by Matt Noveskey, mixed by Chuck Alkazian)
- Skin & Heart & Lungs (E.P.) (2012, self-released, produced by Dwight Baker)
- Midnight Holiday (2014, self-released, produced by Matt Noveskey)
