= Sarah Spencer =

American singer-songwriter

- Born: Ocala, Florida, United States
- Genres: Singer-songwriter, Alternative rock, vocal, operatic pop, Folk rock
- Instruments: Vocals, piano
- Member of: Angelfire
- Website: sarahspencer.com

Sarah Spencer (born in Ocala, Florida) is an American singer, songwriter and pianist.

== Biography ==
Spencer began writing and recording at age 11. She became excited by the possibilities of simultaneous musical parts, and experimented with different genres, including orchestral music. This new direction was encouraged by lessons with classical vocal trainer, Shannon Riley. Over the next two years, Spencer was on stage and in the studio with increasing frequency. She collaborated with other musicians from around the world, singing and co-writing with established artists such as Nigel Jenkins ("Baker’s Street"), David Ricard ("Zoom Zoom") and regular collaborator, Paul Weston ("We Are the Future", "My Desire", "Shine").

At 14, Spencer caught the attention of vocal coach Louise Ryan (Charlotte Church) who began classical training and collaborating with her on vocal arrangements. Later that year, she recorded "Father’s Song" for Cinderella, The Movie with songwriter/producer Al Steele. Spencer also began appearing in local magazines, television shows and amongst the winners of state competitions. The media focus led to her being cast in a VH1 reality show following the lives of musical teen prodigies.

Spencer's next professional leap came at age 16. Guitarist/composer Steve Morse (Deep Purple, Dixie Dregs) was well known as an instrumentalist, but not as a collaborator with vocalists. All this changed when the two artists met. Morse was impressed with Spencer's musicality, and they began working together on a collaboration entitled Angelfire. The album, of the same name, was released on June 22, 2010, on Radiant Records. The album features Dave LaRue and Van Romaine of the Steve Morse Band on bass and drums, respectively. Angelfire has a textural, acoustic sound.

Spencer and Morse took Angelfire to the stage in January 2010, and then again in February, opening for the Steve Morse Band. A preview edition of the album was available for concert-goers.

Spencer is currently working on her solo material.

== Discography ==
=== With Angelfire ===
- 2010 Angelfire
