= Angelfire (band) =

- Sarah Spencer and Steve Morse as Angelfire

Background information
- Origin: Florida, United States
- Genres: Pop, folk rock, country, new-age, jazz fusion, classical crossover
- Years active: 2008-present
- Labels: Radiant
- Members: Steve Morse, Sarah Spencer
- Website: Angelfire website

Angelfire is an American musical duo composed of Steve Morse and Sarah Spencer. Their music combines folk rock, country and jazz fusion within a pop context. The vocal arrangements are influenced by classical and new-age music.

The duo's lyrics are introspective and invoke the story-telling of folk and country traditions.

== History ==
Sarah Spencer met Steve Morse in 2007 when her father asked his neighbor (Morse) to hear Sarah sing. Morse was very impressed by her singing and songwriting, and offered to collaborate with her on original material. Sarah had already worked with some acclaimed producers, but this was her first major project.

Steve and Sarah wrote and recorded in the studio adjoining his house. Steve brought many songs and ideas to the sessions, as did Sarah. The resulting work reflects both of their musical voices, and a new sound for both artists.

Steve recruited his band members Dave LaRue and Van Romaine to perform and record the bass guitar, drum and percussion parts. Dave recorded his parts in Florida with Steve and Sarah; Van recorded in New York and Germany.

== Live performances ==
Angelfire opened for the Steve Morse Band on two segments (West and East coast) of their tour in support of Out Standing in Their Field. Steve and Sarah were joined on stage by supporting musicians Ron Spencer (bass guitar) and Bill Evans (keyboard).

== Members ==
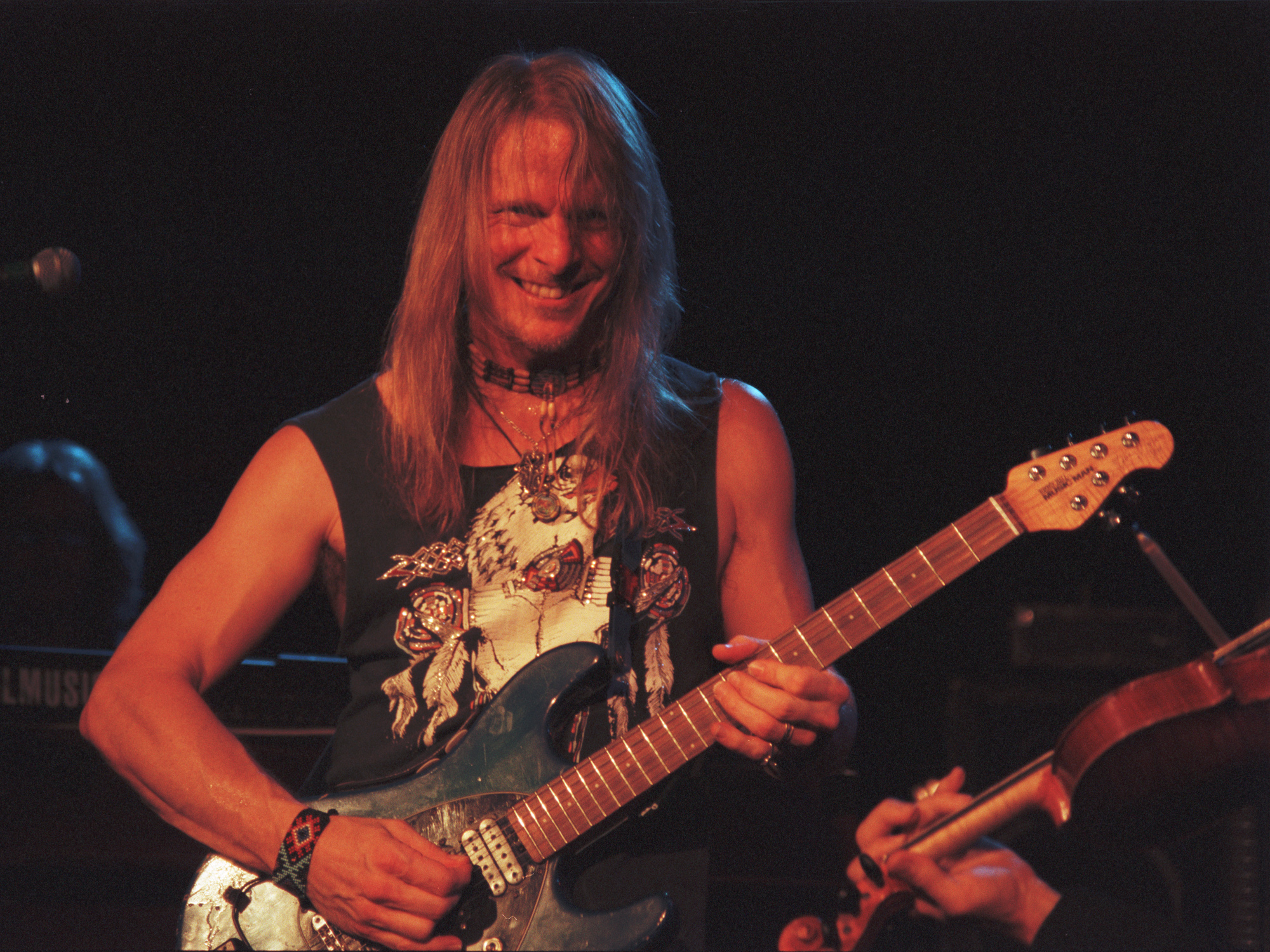
Angelfire guitarist Steve Morse

=== Current members ===
- Steve Morse – acoustic guitar, electric guitar, synthesizer, keyboard
- Sarah Spencer – vocals

=== Session members ===
- Dave LaRue – bass guitar
- Van Romaine – drums, percussion

== Discography ==
- Angelfire (2010 Radiant Records)
