= Flying Colors (band) =

American rock supergroup

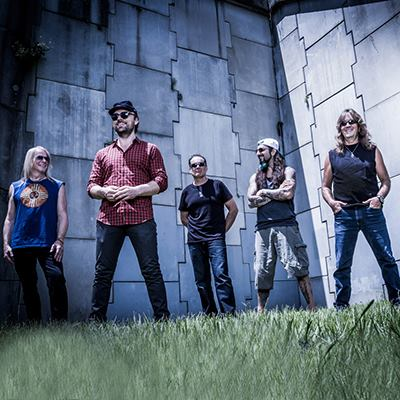
- Flying Colors in 2014

Background information
- Genres: Progressive rock
- Years active: 2011–2014; 2019–present
- Label: Mascot Label Group
- Members: Casey McPherson; Neal Morse; Steve Morse; Dave LaRue; Mike Portnoy
- Website: flyingcolorsmusic.com

Flying Colors is an American supergroup composed of Mike Portnoy, Dave LaRue, Casey McPherson, Neal Morse, and Steve Morse. The band's mission, chartered by executive producer Bill Evans, is to combine complex music with accessible songwriting. Flying Colors, on Mascot Label Group, has released three studio albums, and three live albums, to commercial success and critical acclaim.

== History ==
=== Formation (2008–2010) ===
In 2008, Evans wrote a proposal for a band that combined sophisticated music (complex composition and virtuoso performances) with accessible, mainstream songwriting. His idea was to channel the complexity through a charismatic pop singer/songwriter, keep the songs short, and use humor.

Evans approached Neal Morse (solo artist, Spock's Beard, Transatlantic, The Neal Morse Band), Dave LaRue (Dixie Dregs, Steve Morse Band, Joe Satriani, Steve Vai), Steve Morse (Steve Morse Band, Dixie Dregs, Deep Purple, Kansas), Mike Portnoy (Dream Theater, Transatlantic), and music producer Peter Collins (Rush, Bon Jovi) about making the band a reality. Kerry Livgren, with whom both Neal and Steve had worked in the past, was also approached, but was eventually ruled out as a consequence of the stroke he suffered in 2009.

The singer/songwriter slot remained unfilled as Evans could not find a suitable candidate. He examined over 100 candidates. Portnoy suggested Casey McPherson, who at the time was signed to Disney's Hollywood Records (Miley Cyrus, Jonas Brothers, Jesse McCartney) label. McPherson's band, Alpha Rev, had recently released the album New Morning, which spent 17 weeks in the Billboard Top-10 chart. Unlike most of the other artists on Hollywood Records, McPherson wrote all his own material, and played multiple instruments on his albums. His songwriting, singing, and stage personae appealed to the band and Evans. McPherson joined the still unnamed band a month before the first writing/recording session. Neal commented that "The idea of having an actual singer, as opposed to a musician that sang, really opened up a whole other world".

=== Flying Colors and Live in Europe (2011–2012) ===
Prior to the primary writing/recording sessions, Neal (who had never worked under a producer before) and Steve Morse met to write, and explore their potential musical chemistry. From this session came major sections of the songs "Blue Ocean" and "Infinite Fire". The band, Evans, and Collins met for nine days at Neal Morse's house and connected studio in January 2011. Evans asked longtime Neal Morse and Mike Portnoy engineer Jerry Guidroz to record and engineer the sessions. During that time, the band members wrote the music, and some of the lyrics, for the rest of the album. Collins helped the band choose between competing song ideas, and help organize songs' structure. Portnoy also took on this role. Portnoy remained at Morse's studio after the rest of the band left, to record final drums for the album. In between their other commitments, over the next six months, recorded overdubs, and in some cases, recorded over their original parts. Several band members met two more times at Neal's studio to record vocals together. Then, Collins chose the final parts that would comprise each of the songs, working with Guidroz to create many of the album's sounds. Collins remarked that Guidroz was one of the best engineers he had ever worked with. Portnoy, Evans, and Guidroz then travelled to Electric Lady Studios to mix the album with Michael Brauer. Over five days, the entire album was mixed. Their debut studio album Flying Colors was released on March 26, 2012. It debuted at No. 9 on Billboard's Hard rock chart, and No. 11 on the BBC's Rock Album chart. In late 2012, the band toured the United States and Europe. They played two shows in the United States, and the rest of the tour in Europe, because shows were closer together. The tour was brief because of conflicting schedules among the members.

Flying Colors recorded their show at Tilburg's 013 venue for release as a Blu-ray/DVD. The venue was chosen because it was a favourite of Neal Morse and Mike Portnoy. Transatlantic and Marillion lighting designer Yenz Nyholm flew in to do lights for the show, having rehearsed from a video recorded on an iPad. The show was recorded and edited by Bernhard Baran and his crew, who had also recorded shows for Transatlantic. Evans insisted on a dolly camera, which was traditionally only used in much larger venues; several rows of audience seats needed to be removed. Released as Live in Europe, the Blu-ray/DVD debuted at No. 1 on the French charts. It was mixed by Jerry Guidroz, who also engineered front of house for the tour. The video was edited by Bernhard Baran. Live in Europe had two other bonus tracks, mixed by Evans, both taken from the band's first European show in Hamburg, Germany. Several employees of Steinberg, including director of marketing Frank Simmerlein, brought an early version of Steinberg's Nuendo Live recording system to capture the show. "Love Is What I'm Waiting For" was released by Mascot Label Group as a bonus for pre-orders; "Blue Ocean" was released as an iTunes-only track. A documentary, First Flight, recounted the band's experiences on the tour, was described as: "Backstage, on the bus, and in extended interviews, discover the seedy and sordid underside to the prog's most dangerous band. And observe the surreal cavalcade of lost innocence when one crew member does the unforgivable on the tour bus." Clips of songs from the band's first performance, as well as from the Hamburg show, were also included.

=== Second Nature and Live at the Z7 (2013–2014) ===
For Flying Colors' second studio release, the band wrote and recorded in four brief stages over a period of 18 months. Writing began over Skype between January and February 2013. Then, the band met at Neal's house in Nashville for three days; later, the band met at Mike Portnoy's house for four days. Jerry Guidroz returned to record the band at both locations. At this point, the songs were written, and final drums were recorded.

Individual recording, overdubs, and arrangement continued over the internet. To help foster a collaborative process, Evans set up a Google Drive repository for the latest parts, and re-mixed the album each time new parts were submitted. Twelve versions of the album exist from these mixes. Flying Colors expanded their instrumental palette on this release. On four songs, they employed violins, violas, and cellos performed by Chris Carmichael and Shane Borth. On another song, "One Love Forever", Eric Darken performed 14 different hand percussion instruments. On "Peaceful Harbor" and "Cosmic Symphony", Neal Morse recorded a gospel choir (The McCrary Sisters). Renowned cover artist Hugh Syme, who had previously collaborated with Portnoy in Dream Theater, was brought on to create the cover and interior artwork. Several covers were designed, until the final one was accepted; the other covers became part of the CD booklet and vinyl artwork. Engineer Rich Mouser mixed the album. Rich was known by Portnoy, Neal and Evans from having mixed every Neal Morse, Spock's Beard and Transatlantic album. Second Nature was released in September 2014, debuting in multiple Top-10 charts, worldwide. In addition to numerous other accolades, the album received two Prog Award nominations: Album of the Year, and Band of the Year. Due to severe scheduling issues, the band could only tour for two weeks. The hole only opened up shortly before the window, itself, so there was not time to prepare properly for the tour. One of the results was that many of the venues the band would have played were already booked. This was also the reason why the band played a show in Pennsylvania instead of New York City. On the evening of the eighth show, the band recorded their show at the Z7 venue in Switzerland. Bernhard Baran, with his crew, recorded the show. The band also filmed their final show of the tour, also with Berran, in Paris.

The music of Second Nature was still new to Flying Colors when they recorded their eighth show at the Z7 on October 12, 2014. The album had been released on September 29, about two weeks earlier, making the music equally new to the audience. Bernhard Baran once again recorded the show with his crew, employing 24 cameras. This venue was a departure for Neal Morse and Mike Portnoy, who had recorded many of their previous shows at the 013 in Tilburg, the Netherlands. For the album release, the band decided to explore new technologies, with Evans designing several new features. One allowed listeners to move between two locations in the venue, while watching the show, each with its own surround mix. Another feature was a 3D audio mix for headphones, where each sound source was positioned in a specific location around the listener. The final feature was a new audio engineering technique, Harmonic Phrase Analysis, which "…reduces the unwanted processing normally associated with contemporary live recordings, imparting a more organic feel to the sound field." Mix engineer Rich Mouser spent 34 days creating four separate mixes and 10 separate masters. Critics characterized the audio as the best live audio they'd heard. The show's video used new technology, as well. Evans worked with Cinnafilm, who mastered the footage by re-texturizing each frame, enhancing the visual dynamic range, and simulating 70mm film stock. Baran edited the show. Second Flight: Live at the Z7 was released on November 13, 2015, on Blu-ray, DVD, 3-LP vinyl, and digital download. A 4K version was not released due to a lack of consumer distribution format, though several songs from the show were uploaded to YouTube at 4K. The 3D headphone mix has not yet been released.

=== Third Degree (2019–present) ===
On August 12, 2019, Neal Morse revealed the title and album art for the band's third studio record entitled, Third Degree. After a five-year hiatus, Flying Colors performed on August 30, 2019, at Morsefest 2019 in Cross Plains, Tennessee. In addition to music from the first two studio albums, the band previewed tracks from their third studio album.

== Members ==
- Casey McPherson – lead vocals, rhythm guitar, keyboards
- Steve Morse – lead guitar
- Neal Morse – keyboards, vocals, guitar
- Dave LaRue – bass
- Mike Portnoy – drums, vocals
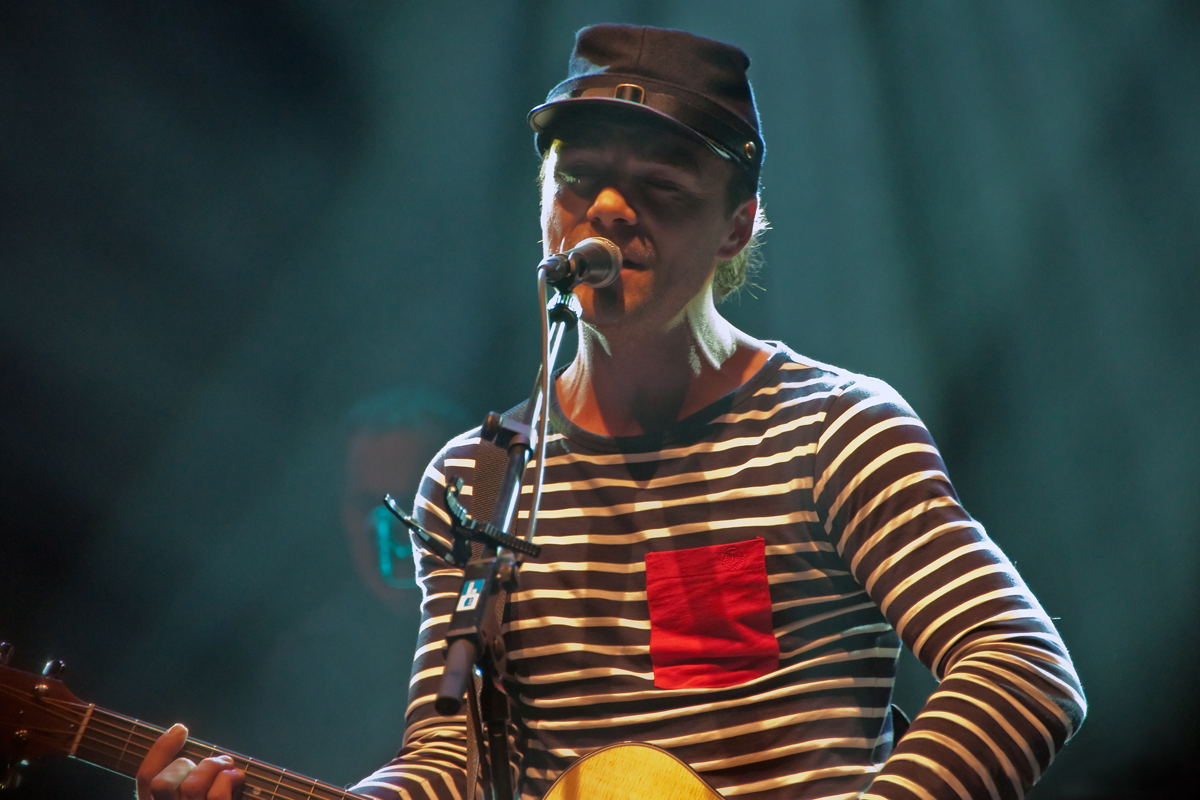
Casey McPherson

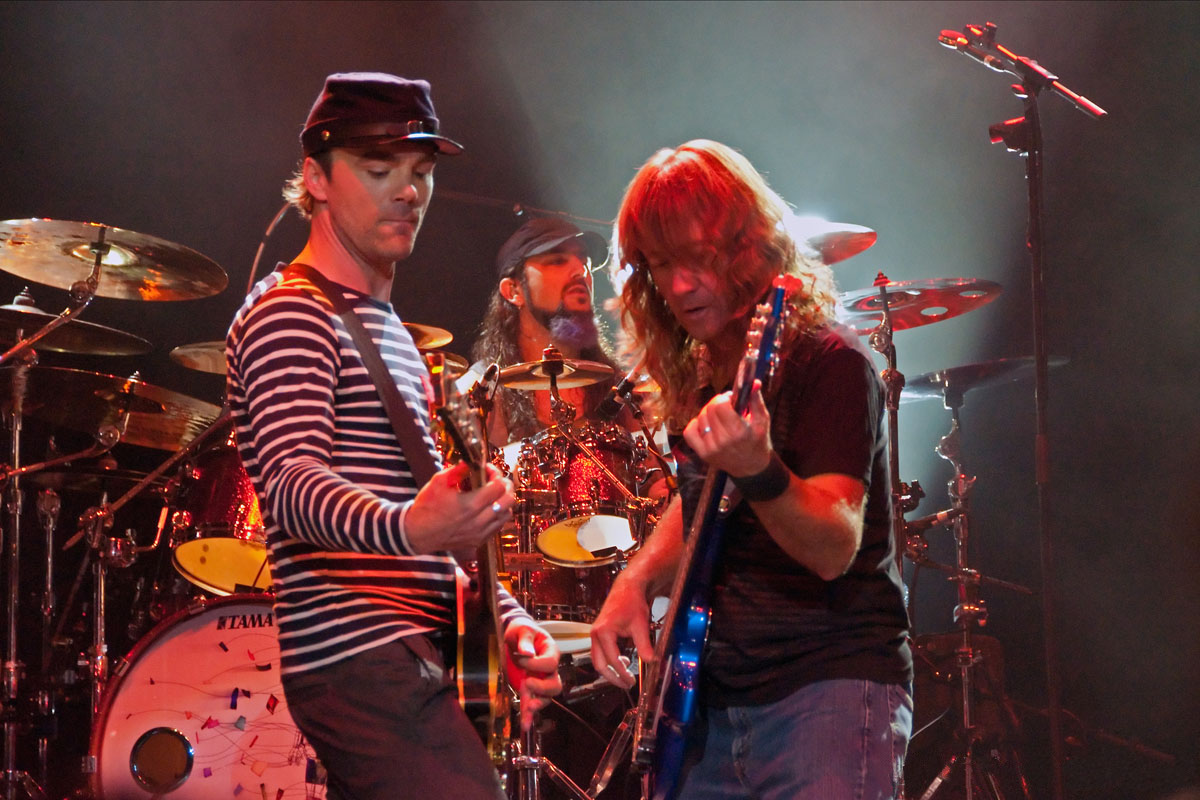
Left to right: Casey McPherson, Mike Portnoy, Dave LaRue

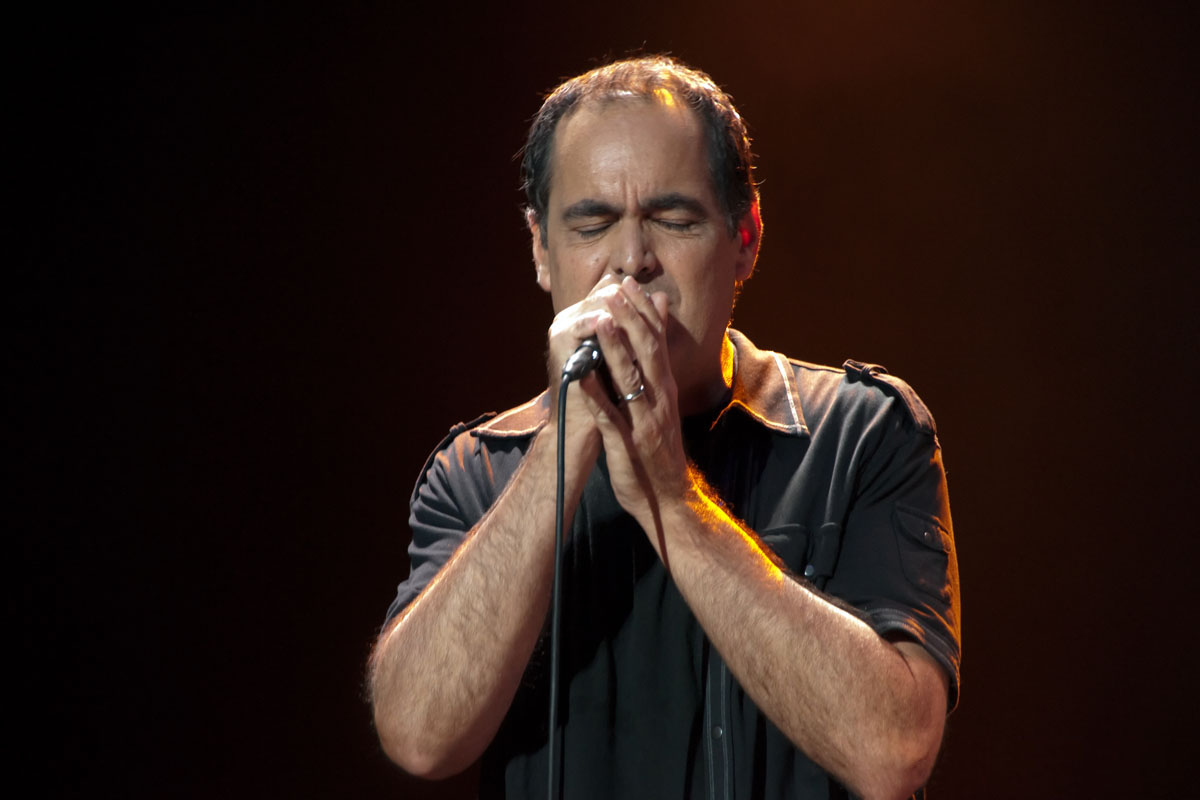
Neal Morse

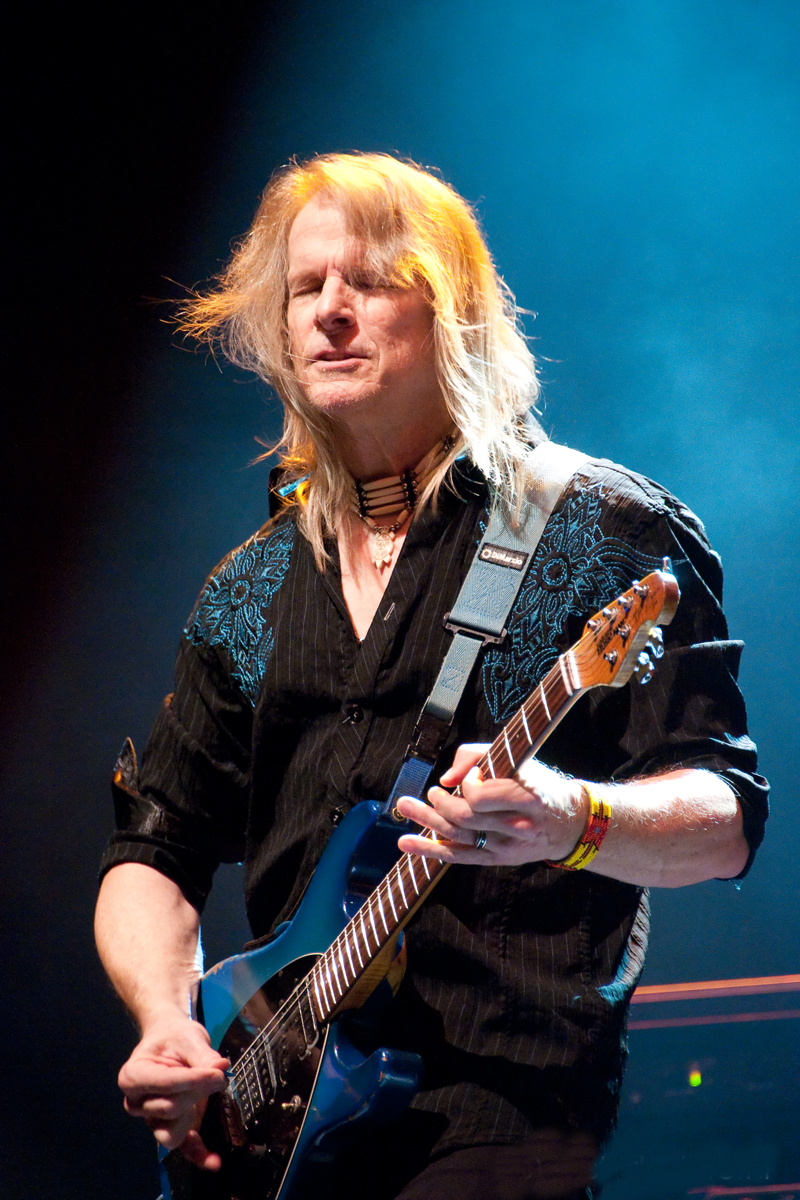
Steve Morse

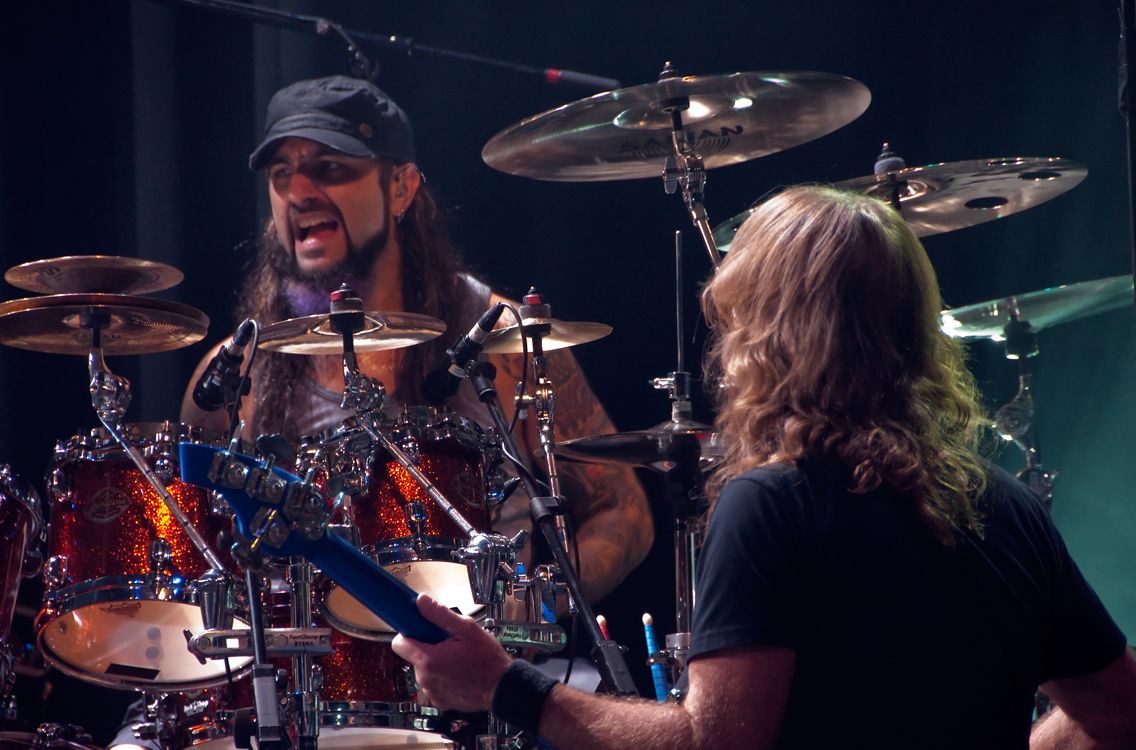
Left to right: Mike Portnoy, Dave LaRue

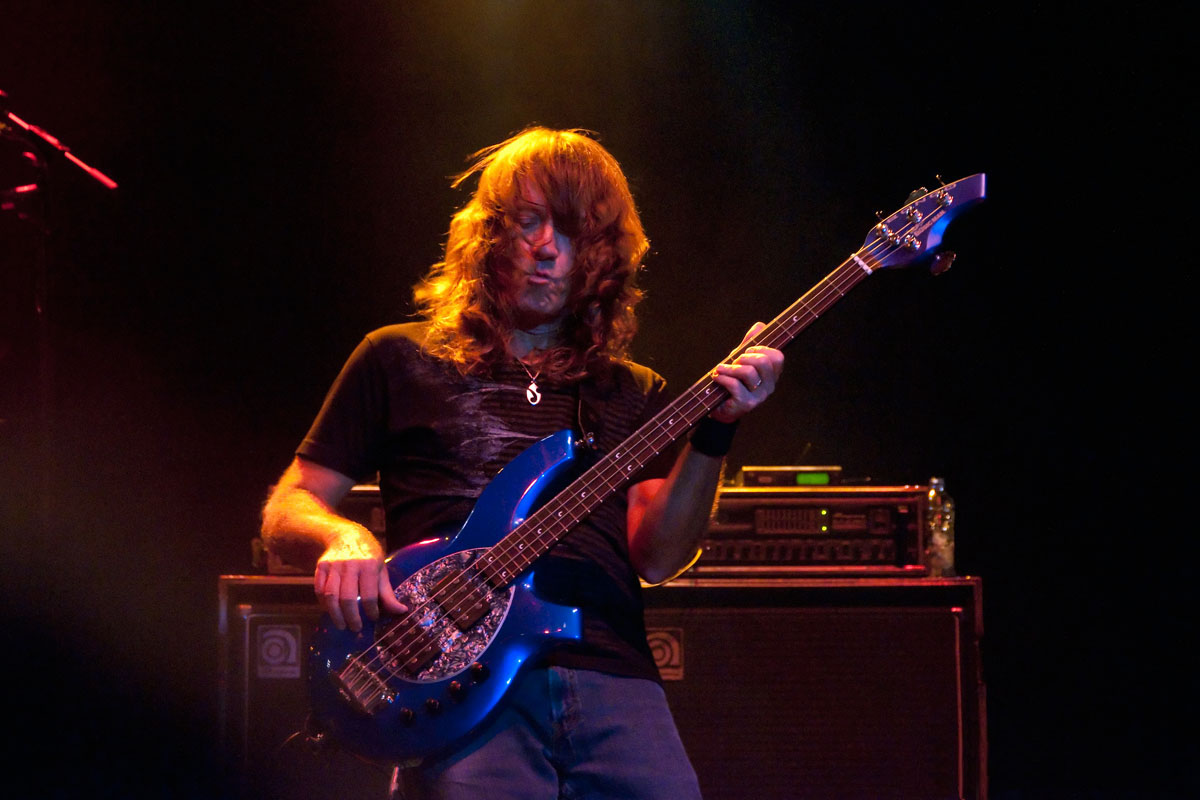
Dave LaRue

== Discography ==
=== Studio albums ===
| Title | Album details | Peak chart positions | | | | | | | | |
| Title | Album details | US (H.R. Chart) | NLD | SWI | SWE | GER | FRA | UK | BEL (WA) | BEL (FL) |
|---|---|---|---|---|---|---|---|---|---|---|
| Flying Colors | Released: March 26, 2012; Label: Mascot Label Group; Formats: Vinyl, CD, digital download | 9 | 51 | 44 | 35 | 55 | — | — | — | — |
| Second Nature | Released: September 30, 2014; Label: Mascot Label Group; Formats: Vinyl, CD, digital download | 4 | 36 | 24 | — | 40 | 96 | 82 | — | — |
| Third Degree | Released: October 4, 2019; Label: Mascot Label Group; Formats: CD, digital download | — | 46 | 11 | — | 16 | 95 | 99 | 62 | — |
"—" denotes a recording that did not chart in the top 100 or was not released in that territory.

=== Live albums ===
| Title | Album details | Peak chart positions | | | | |
| Title | Album details | FRA | GER | NLD | SWE | SWI |
|---|---|---|---|---|---|---|
| Live in Europe | Released: October 15, 2013; Label: Mascot Label Group; Formats: Vinyl, CD, digital download | 1 | 71 | — | 15 | 10 |
| Second Flight: Live at the Z7 | Released: November 13, 2015; Label: Music Theories; Format: 2×CD/Blu-ray | 129 | 55 | 12 | 35 | 44 |
| Third Stage: Live in London | Released: September 18, 2020; Label: Music Theories | | | | | |
| Morsefest 2019 | Released: August 27, 2021; Label: Radiant Records | | | | | |
"—" denotes a recording that did not chart in the top 100 or was not released in that territory.

=== Demo releases ===
Second Nature Roughs was released in September 2019 as part of Neal Morse's Inner Circle fan club.

=== Documentaries ===
The Making of Flying Colors was released in 2012 directly via Mascot Label Group on DVD.
