= Moniker Guitars =

American guitar manufacturing company

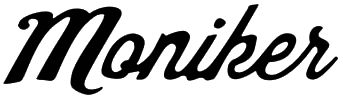
- Type: Private
- Industry: Musical instruments
- Founded: 2012
- Founder: Kevin Tully and Dave Barry
- Defunct: 2018; 8 years ago
- Headquarters: Austin, Texas, United States
- Products: Electric guitars
- Website: monikerguitars.com

Moniker Guitars was an American guitar manufacturing company based Austin, Texas. It operated from 2012 to 2018 producing electric guitars.

Each guitar was custom built based on designs submitted by customers using an online design tool. Moniker's manufacturing process enabled their guitars to sell at prices comparable to store-bought guitars.

== History ==
The company was inspired when amateur guitar player Kevin Tully observed a bicycle manufactured by Republic Bike of Dania Beach, Florida, which allows customers to design each bike using an online tool.

In 2012, Moniker Guitars was founded by Tully and his associate Dave Barry, both natives of Boston.

Original funding of $25,000 was provided by IDEA, the business incubator at Northeastern University, and in 2013, a Kickstarter campaign was used to raise an additional $60,000 from 155 backers.

By 2014, the company employed six people operating out of a shared workspace in Austin, and was producing approximately 12 electric guitars per week.

Moniker Guitars closed in 2018.

== Manufacturing ==
Customers used a "configurator" tool on Moniker's website to choose from three body styles, five stains, and 17 paint colors, as well as different component parts, including a pickup by Seymour Duncan. Text and user-designed graphics could also be added. The configurator software cost about $10,000, and the company's goal was to create an interface that was clean, simple, and easy to use. Moniker then used CNC milling to precisely produce the guitar body, which was made from domestically sourced wood. A fast-drying clearcoat manufactured by Simtec Coatings was then applied, followed by environmentally-safe water-based paints by PPG Industries. Adobe Illustrator and a vinyl plotter were used to create stencils from which text and graphics were applied. Though the company could assemble the guitar in 24 hours, the final product was shipped to customers in four weeks.

== Reception ==
In 2013, Moniker Guitars was featured on MSNBC's Your Business.

The company's website stated that their guitars had been purchased by Kyle Shutt of The Sword, and Justin Bradley and Josh Withenshaw of Anarbor. It also showed photos of various musicians playing Moniker Guitars, including Matt Noveskey of Blue October, Paul Marc Rousseau and Shane Told of Silverstein, and Andy Lane of Driver Friendly.
