= Thick as Thieves (song) =

Single by Cavo

from the album Thick as Thieves
- Released: 2011
- Recorded: 2011–2012
- Genre: Post-grunge; hard rock
- Length: 3:34
- Label: Eleven Seven
- Songwriters: Ted Bruner; Chris Hobbs; Chad La Roy; Brian Smith; Casey Walker
- Producer: Kato Khandwala

Cavo singles chronology
"Cry Wolf" (2009)	"Thick as Thieves" (2011)	"Celebrity" (2012)

"Thick as Thieves" is the lead single from Cavo's second studio album, Thick as Thieves.

== Charts ==
Chart (2011)	Peak position
US Mainstream Rock (Billboard)	22
