= Moonlight Social =

American pop rock duo

Moonlight Social is an American pop rock music duo composed of singer-songwriters Jeremy Burchard and Jennica Scott. Their music has been described as a combination of alternative rock, pop, pop punk, folk, and adult contemporary.

== History ==
=== 2009-10: Early beginnings ===
Burchard and Scott first met in September 2009 as members of The University of Texas Longhorn Marching Band, Burchard as a tenor player on the drum line and Scott as a trumpet player. After Scott approached Burchard on Facebook about his music, the two struck up a friendship. In February 2010, Burchard posted a video of the duo covering Reckless Kelly's "Wicked Twisted Road" and the Eagles' "Hotel California" on his personal YouTube page, marking the first collaboration between the two. In August 2010, Burchard and Scott began writing songs together. In December 2010, they performed a set of music at NeWorlDeli, a local restaurant near The University of Texas campus.

=== 2011: Formation and debut EP ===
Burchard and Scott officially formed Moonlight Social on January 14, 2011. The duo reportedly chose the name "Moonlight Social" as a metaphor for their honest, conversational songwriting style. Burchard recorded, produced, and mixed the band's debut, self-titled Moonlight Social EP on a budget of $150. Before the EP came out, Ray Benson of western swing band Asleep At The Wheel selected Moonlight Social to play a spotlight stage at Austin-Bergstrom International Airport as part of the South by Southwest Festival. The debut self-titled EP earned praise for its strong vocals, bittersweet lyrics, and pop melodies.

The duo won a chance to perform at the Austin Chronicle Hot Sauce Fest in August 2011 after their song "Neither Are You" won a local competition called the Austin Chronicle Sound Wars. In November 2011, they launched a Kickstarter crowdfunding campaign to fund their debut album.

=== 2012-15: Heading South, increased touring, and "Rub A Little Dirt On It" ===
In February 2012, Moonlight Social recorded their debut album Heading South in Austin, Texas. Burchard co-produced the record alongside Blue October bassist Matt Noveskey. The duo released the album on July 21, 2012, along with a music video for lead single "Heading South".

The album received unanimous praise from regional press, with Kevin Allen at Texas Music magazine saying, "Burchard's alt-rock licks and Scott's country roots meld together effortlessly. As do their voices: the boy-girl harmonies throughout the record are a joy to listen to." Sean Claes at INsite Austin said of the album, "The trade-off of the vocals is enchanting and the wordplay is fantastic…a VERY solid album, both musically and lyrically."

The band soon put an emphasis on touring to different bars, clubs, and festivals, expanding their performances beyond Texas into neighboring states, the Midwest, and eventually Toronto, Canada. In January 2015, two and a half years after the song first came out, Moonlight Social released "Heading South" to Texas regional radio. The band began frequently traveling to Nashville, Tennessee to write and record.

In October 2015, they released "Rub A Little Dirt On It" as a single, along with a humorous music video. The song earned the band praise as a "record to watch" from Texas radio. It also caught the eye of more Nashville-based outlets. Nashville Gab called the song "the perfect song for when you feel like a complete loser." Country music historian and music critic for Nashville music industry publication MusicRow said of the band, "These two Texans can sure-nuff sing. This funky little thang is produced to provide plenty of space for their flawless harmonizing. I have liked this Jeremy-and-Jennica team in the past. This new single makes me positive that they deserve stardom. Somebody sign these folks up for the Big Time."

"Rub A Little Dirt On It" was recognized by the NSAI Song Contest present by CMT and eventually won the 2015 SongDoor International Songwriting Contest country category.

=== 2016-18: Move to Nashville, Make You Smile EP, and Singles ===
In June 2016, Moonlight Social moved from Austin, Texas to Nashville, Tennessee. They entered the studio in February 2017 to record a new collection of songs eventually dubbed the Make You Smile EP, co-produced by Burchard and Prime Recording's Derek Garten. On August 18, 2017, Moonlight Social released new single "Make You Smile" exclusively to Spotify. Upon its release, The Huffington Post called the single "simply irresistible," saying it "has hit written all over it."

On January 12, 2018, Moonlight Social released the single "Bad Side" exclusively to Spotify. They then announced the Make You Smile EP release date slated for April 13, 2018. Upon its release, the Make You Smile EP became Moonlight Social's first recorded work to chart on Billboard, debuting at No. 49 on Country Album Sales and No. 2 on Heatseekers — South Central for the week ending April 28, 2018. The EP received favorable reviews, with The Daily Country calling it "engaging and ear-grabbing."

In August 2018, Moonlight Social signed a booking agreement with Pier30 Music Agency. They left the agency several months later to resume scheduling independently and focus on content creation.

On September 21, 2018, Moonlight Social released the single "Where The World Ends," using fan-submitted pictures from high school to create the lyric video and a music video (directed and edited by Burchard) including members of the Vanderbilt University marching band. On January 26, 2019 the duo released the single "That Way," eventually filming another music video directed by Burchard and featuring members of the band.

=== 2019: "Valleys and Peaks," "Keeping Up With The Joneses" and New Album ===
On April 26, 2019, Moonlight Social released the single "Valleys and Peaks" and hinted that they are working on their second full-length album, their first since 2012. The duo then released another song off the album, "Keeping Up With The Joneses," along with an accompanying music video. Nashville Noise called the video "fun-loving" and their "favorite of their music videos so far."

The duo then released additional singles in advance of their sophomore album, due Fall 2020.

=== 2020—Present: The Carrot and beyond ===
Moonlight Social released their sophomore album The Carrot on October 9, 2020. The 18-track album features a narrative short story written by Burchard and Scott followed by 17 songs co-written by the duo (along with "Oh, Mary Beth" co-written by Afrika Fuentes and "Chasing After Fairytales," co-written by Skidd Mills). Burchard produced, recorded, mixed, and mastered the entirety of the songs in a house in Nashville, Tennessee.

In January 2021, Moonlight Social released the single and music video for "What Do You Want From Me?" The song was praised as "a punk pop meets alt rock inspired anthem that navigates the process of leaving a toxic relationship or situation while simultaneously accepting that some people can never be pleased."

== Discography ==
- Moonlight Social EP (2011)
- Heading South (2012)
- "Rub A Little Dirt On It" — Single (2015)
- Make You Smile EP (2018)
- "Where The World Ends" — Single (2018)
- "That Way" — Single (2019)
- "Valleys and Peaks" — Single (2019)
- "Keeping Up With The Joneses" — Single (2019)
- "Know Me" — Single (2019)
- "Better Off" — Single (2020)
- "Holding Patterns" — Single (2020)
- "An Ode To Humanity" — Single (2020)
- "Ever After" — Single (2020)
- "Make It Better" — Single (2020)
- "Old Love" — Single (2020)
- "Chasing After Fairytales" — Single (2020)
- "Oh, Mary Beth" — Single (2020)
- The Carrot (2020)
- "What Do You Want From Me?" — Single (2021)
- Imposter Syndrome (2023)
