= Third Degree (Flying Colors album) =

Studio album by Flying Colors
- Released: October 4, 2019
- Genre: Progressive rock, hard rock, progressive metal
- Length: 66:23
- Label: Mascot Label Group
- Producer: Flying Colors

Flying Colors chronology
Second Nature (2014)	Third Degree (2019)

Singles from Third Degree
- 1. "More" Released: August 14, 2019; 2. "You Are Not Alone" Released: August 28, 2019; 3. "Love Letter" Released: September 12, 2019; 4. "The Loss Inside" Released: September 30, 2019

Third Degree is the third studio album by the American supergroup Flying Colors, released on October 4, 2019, via Mascot Label Group.

The album was released on digital platforms and also on CD digipack, a limited-edition double-LP, a 180g blue or black vinyl and a limited-edition box set with bonus content such as a 40-page photobook, two coasters and a bonus disc with six bonus songs.

Third Degree's first single and video, "More", was released as the band revealed the album's title, cover and tracklist. The second single, "You Are Not Alone", was released on August 28, 2019. The third, pop rock single "Love Letter", was released on September 12 and the final single, "The Loss Inside", about the process of grieving, had its video premiered on September 30, 2019.

== Recording and song information ==
The album's first sessions took place as early as December 2016, at guitarist Steve Morse's studio in Florida, United States, when seven songs were written. The band wouldn't meet again until December 2018, when three other songs were created. By then, drummer and vocalist Mike Portnoy was already recording his parts at keyboardist and vocalist Neal Morse's studio in Nashville.

"The Loss Inside" is the only song of the album tuned in drop D. Vocalist and guitarist Casey McPherson commented that the song allows him to use "soul" vocals and Steve and Neal to work on "their own version of rock and roll".

"More" is a song about the desperation for "freedom from addiction, consumerism, and lust". McPherson saw "Cadence" as "one of those songs that is such a classic 'product' of us. A strong mix of each of our creative energies in each section to create what we are."

"Last Train Home" was built upon a musical idea that Steve saved for the band. He commented: "I always tend toward a kind of triumphant feel when I do instrumental sections... possibly because I listened to a lot of classical music over the years." He used a 12-string guitar and many "jangly clean guitars with open strings".

Bassist Dave LaRue saw Geronimo as "a bit of a departure for Flying Colors" and it reminded him of Steely Dan. "You Are Not Alone" was seen by McPherson as a follow-up to Second Nature's "Peaceful Harbor". He wrote the song about the effects of Hurricane Harvey in his hometown of Austin, Texas and his experience rescuing victims.

McPherson described "Love Letter" as influenced by The Beach Boys, The Beatles, Jellyfish, ELO, Silverchair. It received a '60s/'70s-inspired psychedelic video.

== Track listing ==
No.	Title	Length
1.	"The Loss Inside"	5:50
2.	"More"	7:09
3.	"Cadence"	7:40
4.	"Guardian"	7:10
5.	"Last Train Home"	10:31
6.	"Geronimo"	5:19
7.	"You Are Not Alone"	6:21
8.	"Love Letter"	5:09
9.	"Crawl"	11:14
Total length:		66:23

Deluxe CD bonus tracks
No.	Title	Length
1.	"Waiting for the Sun"	8:55
2.	"Geronimo" (alternate instrumental version and mix)	5:19
3.	"You Are Not Alone" (alternate instrumental version and mix)	4:21
4.	"Love Letter" (alternate acoustic version and mix)	5:12
5.	"Last Train Home" (alternate instrumental version and mix)	11:17
6.	"Crawl" (alternate instrumental version and mix)	7:49
Total length:		42:53

Professional ratings
Review scores
Source	Rating
Sonic Perspectives	9.0/10 stars
The Prog Space	9/10 stars

== Critical reception ==
Loudwire named Third Degree one of the 50 best rock albums of 2019.

Sonic Perspectives called the album "a mature, consistent third album which is melodically strong and diverse." and added "This makes for one of the best rock/pop/prog bands of the decade, and is a big colorful feather in the cap of its illustrious members."

The bonus track, Waiting for the Sun, also received praise as Heaven's Metal called the song, "another perfect example of the concerted band effort so prominent on this release. This smooth textured, light-rock anthem, with plenty of guitar flare and lyrical color, is easily worthy of the main release."

== Personnel ==
Flying Colors

- Casey McPherson – lead vocals, guitar
- Neal Morse – vocals, keyboards, acoustic guitar
- Mike Portnoy – drums, percussion, handclaps, vocals
- Steve Morse – lead guitar
- Dave LaRue – bass guitar

Production

- Flying Colors – production
- Bill Evans – executive producer, HPAR, post-production engineer
- Rich Mouser – mixing, mastering
- Jerry Guidroz – recording engineer
- Brian Moritz – recording engineer
- Thomas Cuce – recording engineer
- Matthew Parmenter – recording engineer
- Bouchra Azizy – additional digital editing
- Chris Carmichael – strings, string arrangement

== Charts ==
Chart (2019)	Peak position
Austrian Albums (Ö3 Austria)	44
Belgian Albums (Ultratop Wallonia)	62
Dutch Albums (Album Top 100)	46
French Albums (SNEP)	95
German Albums (Offizielle Top 100)	16
Scottish Albums (OCC)	28
Spanish Albums (PROMUSICAE)	81
Swiss Albums (Schweizer Hitparade)	11
UK Albums (OCC)	99
