= Angelfire (album) =

Studio album by Angelfire
- Released: June 22, 2010
- Genre: Pop, folk rock, country, new-age, jazz fusion, classical crossover
- Language: English
- Label: Radiant
- Producer: Steve Morse

Angelfire is a collaboration album by guitarist/composer singer Steve Morse and singer/songwriter Sarah Spencer, collectively known as the group (by the same name), Angelfire. It was released on August 10, 2010 by Radiant Records.

== Track listing ==
Angelfire
No.	Title	Length
1.	"Far Gone Now"	4:04
2.	"Everything to Live For"	4:16
3.	"Feelings are Overrated"	3:26
4.	"What Made You Think?"	5:36
5.	"Here Today"	3:33
6.	"Get Away"	4:01
7.	"Pleasant Surprise"	5:53
8.	"Terrible Thing to Lose"	5:34
9.	"Omnis Morse Aequat"	4:30
10.	"Take It or Leave It"	2:50
11.	"Urban Decay"	2:40

== Personnel ==
- Sarah Spencer – vocals
- Steve Morse – acoustic guitar, electric guitar, synthesizer, keyboard
- Dave LaRue – bass guitar
- Van Romaine – drums, percussion

Production

- Steve Morse – production
- Bill Evans – mastering engineering
- Steve Morse – audio engineering
