= Alpha Rev =

American rock band

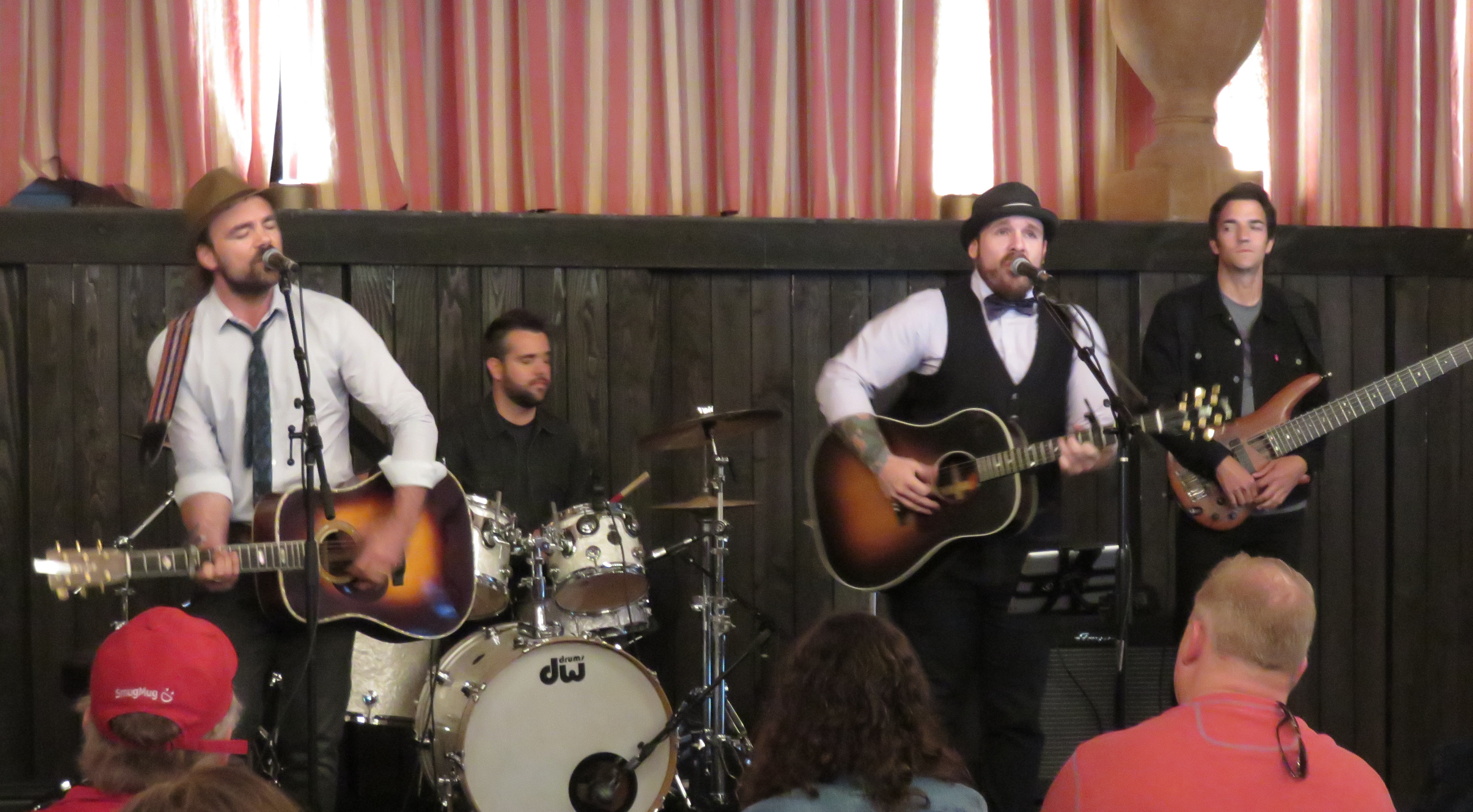
- Alpha Rev performing in 2015

Background information
- Origin: Austin, Texas, United States
- Genres: Alternative rock
- Years active: 2005–Present
- Labels: Flyer Records/Surefire Media/Sea Change; Hollywood Records; Kirtland Records
- Members: Casey McPherson (lead vocals, guitar, keyboard)
- Past members: Zak Loy (Lead Guitar); Candi Sanders (keyboard, vocals); Sanjay Jain (bass, vocals); Gautam Chhada (guitar, vocals); Tim McGregor (drums); Tony Schmidt (keyboards); Alex Dunlap (bass); Dorian Colbert (drums); Drew Walters (bass); Tommy Roalson (drums); Derek Dunivan (guitar, vocals); Dusty Saxton (drums); Nick Jay (bass); Dave Wiley (cello, vocals); Derek Morris (keyboard); Daniel Jones (drums); Clint Simmons (drums, vocals); Jeff Bryant (piano, organ, pedal steel, bass, vocals); Brian Batch (violin, vocals); Tabber Millard (drums, percussion, guitar, vocals); Wes Ardis (guitar, vocals); Matt Noveskey (bass)

Alpha Rev is an American alternative rock band from Austin, Texas, fronted by Casey McPherson (formerly of Endochine). McPherson remains the group's only consistent member. However, historically the core members have also included Zak Loy on lead guitar, Brian Batch on violin and backing vocals, and Dave Wiley on cello.

== History ==
Casey McPherson started Alpha Rev in 2005 after his previous band Endochine broke up. Alpha Rev released their debut album The Greatest Thing I've Ever Learned on March 1, 2007. After releasing "The Greatest Thing" locally, the band signed an agreement with Austin startup Flyer Records and recorded an album with Dwight Baker at Matchbox Studios. This album has not been released, and the rights were purchased by Hollywood Records.

In 2007 the Myspace.com charts ranked Alpha Rev as the #1 indie band from Texas, and the #16 indie band nationwide. Alpha Rev was selected by Austin Monthly Magazine as one of the local bands most likely to succeed in 2008.

In August 2008 Alpha Rev signed their first major label record deal with Hollywood Records. Their international debut album was recorded at Avatar Studios in New York City. The album, entitled New Morning was produced by David Kahne, engineered by Joe Barresi and mixed by Michael Brauer.

In 2010 Alpha Rev topped the charts with New Morning reaching #3 on radio, and their video was in the top 10 rotation on VH1. They were also featured as one of VH1's "You Oughta Know, Artist on the Rise."

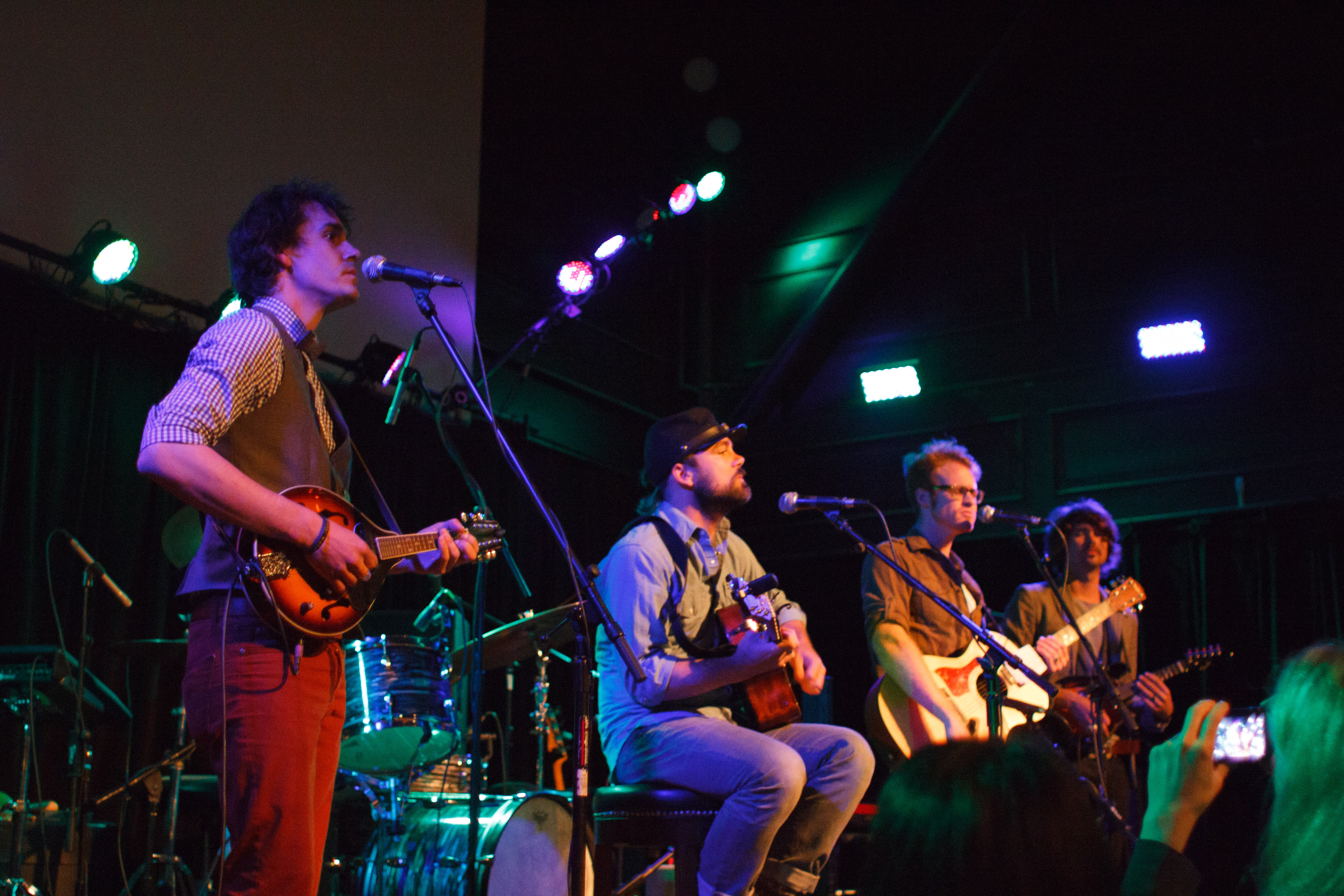
Alpha Rev playing at the Old Rock House in St. Louis in 2013

On December 5, 2012 Alpha Rev published a lyric video for their soon-to-be-released single, "Sing Loud". On January 3, 2013 the single was made available on iTunes, and a full video was released March 11, 2013. Their third album Bloom was released March 19, 2013 on Kirtland Records. Alpha Rev again achieved radio chart success with the single "Sing Loud" reaching #10.

Casey McPherson also fronts the successful Prog-Rock supergroup Flying Colors. Other members include Mike Portnoy, Dave LaRue, Neal Morse and Steve Morse.

== Awards ==
- Alpha Rev's song "Colder Months" won Sonicbids 2007 Snocap/American Songwriter contest. Casey McPherson was featured in the Nov/Dec 2007 issue of American Songwriter Magazine as one of the best new and upcoming songwriters.
- Casey McPherson was selected as a featured artist to perform at the 10th annual Jeff Buckley tribute at Uncommon Ground in Chicago in November 2007.
- In 2009 and 2010, Alpha Rev was recognized by the Austin Chronicle at the Austin Music Awards during SXSW as one of Austin's best performing rock bands. Also receiving individual performance honors in both years was bassist, Alex Dunlap.
- In May 2009, Alpha Rev was named Austin's best rock band by Rare Magazine in their annual "Rarest of them All" issue.
- Alpha Rev has performed at Austin City Limits Music Festival, Terminal 5, The CMJ Music Marathon and SXSW, as well as main stages at The State Fair of Texas, Summerfest, Michele Clark 's Sunset Session, multiple times and was one of the 4 bands on the first Sunset sessions tour and the Red Rocks Amphitheatre.
- In April 2010, Alpha Rev was named VH1's newest "You Oughtta Know" Artist
- On May 1, 2010, Alpha Rev's video for "New Morning" debuted on the VH1 Top 20 Video Countdown. In all, "New Morning" spent 11 weeks on the countdown, peaking at the #7 position.

== Discography ==
=== Studio albums ===
- The Greatest Thing I've Ever Learned (2007, re-released in 2008)
- Untitled Flyer Records (recorded in 2007, unreleased)
- New Morning (2010)
- Bloom (2013)
- Cas.e Sessions - Volume 1 (2018)
- Open (2020)

=== Extended plays ===
- Alpha Rev (2006)
- City Farm Roots (2011)

=== Singles ===
- "New Morning" - #100 Billboard Hot 100
- "Phoenix Burn" - #37
- "Sing Loud" - #15 Billboard Adult Contemporary

== Compilations and soundtracks ==
- "Colder Months" and "Phoenix Burn" were featured during Season 1 of CW's Melrose Place.
- "China Sunrise" and "Wedding Day" were featured during Season 1 of Bravo's TV show, "NYC Prep".
- "Phoenix Burn" was featured in a promotional advertisement for the 3rd season of the abcfamily TV show, Greek.
- "Colder Months" appeared on the compilation Breaking the Silence.
- "Though I Walk" was featured in the film Pineapple
- "New Morning" was featured during Season 4 of ABC's "Brothers & Sisters".
- "New Morning" was featured in "Greek".
- "New Morning" was also featured in The Last Song and was included on the soundtrack album.
- "Colder Months" was featured during Season 3 of Celebrity Rehab with Dr. Drew on VH1
- "Face Down" is featured in the Activision video game Guitar Hero 5
- "Walk This Line" (currently unreleased) has been featured frequently during ESPN's SportsCenter
- "Colder Months" was featured in a promotional advertisement for The OCD Project on VH1.
- "When Did I Wake Up" was featured during Season 2 of USA Network's TV show, Royal Pains.
- "Phoenix Burn" was featured on the official soundtrack of the Walt Disney Pictures production, The Sorcerer's Apprentice (2010 film).
- "Phoenix Burn" was featured in the Nintendo 3DS version of the videogame The Sims 3 (EA Games).
