= Champagne (Cavo song) =

Single by Cavo

from the album Bright Nights Dark Days
- Released: March 17, 2009
- Recorded: 2008
- Genre: Post-grunge; hard rock
- Length: 3:07
- Label: Reprise; Warner
- Songwriters: Chris Hobbs; Chad La Roy; Brian Smith; Casey Walker

Cavo singles chronology
"Unsung" (2002)	"Champagne" (2009)	"Crash" (2009)

Music video
- "Champagne" on YouTube

"Champagne" is the lead single from Cavo's debut album, Bright Nights Dark Days. It was released to rock radio at the end of March 2009 and received strong airplay. It peaked at number one on the US Mainstream Rock Songs chart. The song was also used in the Formula One 2010 Canadian Grand Prix race edit.

== Background ==
In 2006, Cavo had just obtained a new bassist, Brian Smith, and had written one song for their new album. However, when they started practicing in Smith's house, the inspiration came, and they penned several new tracks. One of these was "Champagne". Singer Casey Walker said, "'Champagne', our first single, is a song that I wrote the chorus in my head and I recorded it on my phone and I showed it to the band almost as a joke because I wasn't sure if it was good or not. They started playing something and it just fell out in like ten minutes".

Cavo are from St. Louis, and the Midwest is often overlooked by rock record labels and radio stations in favor of the West and East Coasts. Unable to attract attention from labels or major radio stations from New York or Los Angeles, Cavo sent some songs to local St. Louis radio station 105.7 KPNT, who played "Champagne" enough for other stations nationwide to notice. Reprise Records also took interest, and once they signed Cavo, they pulled the song from the airwaves and made them re-record it for better quality before re-releasing it to greater mainstream success.

== Music video ==
A music video was released for this video in 2009. It was directed by ZFCL.

== Charts ==
Chart (2009)	Peak position
US Bubbling Under Hot 100 (Billboard)	9
US Mainstream Rock Songs (Billboard)	1
US Alternative Songs (Billboard)	22
US Rock Songs (Billboard)	8
