= The Greatest Thing I've Ever Learned =

Studio album by Alpha Rev
- Released: March 1, 2007; February 12, 2008
- Genre: Pop rock
- Producer: Dwight Baker, Lars Goransson, Casey McPherson, Josh Moore

Alpha Rev chronology
The Greatest Thing I've Ever Learned (2007)	New Morning (2010)

Alternative cover
- Artwork for the original 2007 release.

Professional ratings
Review scores
Source	Rating
Soundcheck Magazine	(favorable)
Austin Chronicle	2.5/5 stars

The Greatest Thing I've Ever Learned is the debut LP by Alpha Rev. The album was independently released in 2007, and then re-released on February 12, 2008 by Sea Change Records with an alternate track listing.

== Original Independent Release ==
All songs written by Casey McPherson.

1. "China Sunrise"
2. "Wedding Day"
3. "Colder Months"
4. "Phoenix Burn"
5. "Stuck in a Crowd"
6. "The Beauty of Falling Down"
7. "Big Blow"
8. "When Did I Wake Up"
9. "Though I Walk (Lower Me Down)"
10. "Star of Wonder"
11. "Get Out"

== 2008 Re-Release ==
1. "Stuck in a Crowd"
2. "China Sunrise"
3. "Wedding Day"
4. "American Jesus"
5. "The Beauty of Falling Down"
6. "Midnight"
7. "My Situation"
8. "Big Blow"
9. "Though I Walk (Lower Me Down)"
10. "Ride Away"
