= Out Standing in Their Field =

Studio album by Steve Morse
- Released: September 29, 2009
- Recorded: LiveWire Production & Recording Studio in New York City; M.O.R. Studio
- Genre: Instrumental rock
- Length: 54:47
- Label: Eagle Rock
- Producer: Steve Morse, Van Romaine, Dave LaRue

Steve Morse chronology
Prime Cuts (2005)	Out Standing in Their Field (2009)	Triangulation (2025)

Professional ratings
Review scores
Source	Rating
AllMusic	3.5/5 stars
Classic Rock	7/10 stars

Out Standing in Their Field is the eleventh studio album by the guitarist Steve Morse, released on September 29, 2009, by Eagle Rock Entertainment.

== Track listing ==
All music is composed by Steve Morse, except where noted.

No.	Title	Length
1.	"Name Dropping"	4:59
2.	"Brink of the Edge"	4:43
3.	"Here and Now and Then"	5:07
4.	"Relentless Encroachment"	4:55
5.	"John Deere Letter"	4:43
6.	"More to the Point"	4:29
7.	"Time Junction" (Kevin Morse, S. Morse)	5:16
8.	"Unnamed Sources"	4:31
9.	"Flight of the Osprey"	3:21
10.	"Baroque 'n Dreams"	3:16
11.	"Rising Power" (live)	9:27
Total length:		54:47

== Personnel ==
- Steve Morse – guitar, production
- Kevin Morse – guitar (track 7)
- Van Romaine – drums, percussion, production
- Dave LaRue – bass, production
- Tim Conklin – engineering, mixing
- Martin Pullan – mastering
