= Bridges (Cavo album) =

Studio album by Cavo
- Released: January 29, 2016
- Studio: Orb Studios (Austin, Texas)
- Genre: Pop; alternative rock; rock
- Length: 50:49
- Label: Cavo Music Experience
- Producer: Matt Noveskey

Cavo chronology
Thick as Thieves (2012)	Bridges (2016)	Bridges, Bright Nights and Thieves (2021)

Singles from Bridges
- 1. "Stay" Released: December 10, 2015; 2. "Just Like We Want It" Released: 2015; 3. "Cynical" Released: February 12, 2016; 4. "On Your Own" Released: May 13, 2016; 5. "Take Me Home" Released: 2016

Professional ratings
Review scores
Source	Rating
CrypticRock	4/5 stars

Bridges is the fourth studio album to be released by hard rock band Cavo. It was released independently on January 29, 2016. It was released digitally a couple of weeks before the official release on PledgeMusic.

The band had joined Meg Myers and Yellawolf for a sold-out show in their hometown of St. Louis, Missouri on October 23, 2015. Cavo will be celebrating and promoting the new album's release with a hometown show on January 29 at The Ready Room in St. Louis, Missouri.

== Background ==
In January 2015, the band have announced that they will start recording their album in Austin, Texas with bass guitarist of rock band Blue October Matt Noveskey.

The band named the album Bridges because they felt like they had crossed over to someplace new, whereas the album cover depicts a bridge. Lead singer Casey Walker explains;

This record is completely ours. If other people like it, great. If they don't, that's fine too. The fans will understand this record, and we feel we have to honor their support by creating something that is 100% Cavo. They would see right through it if we didn't.

== Track listing ==
All lyrics are written by Cavo.

No.	Title	Length
1.	"Nights"	4:08
2.	"Just Like We Want It"	4:14
3.	"Stay"	3:58
4.	"She Don't Care"	3:41
5.	"On Your Own"	4:16
6.	"Get Away"	3:03
7.	"Fight This War"	4:50
8.	"Weather Rolls"	4:25
9.	"Traitor"	3:38
10.	"Cynical"	4:04
11.	"Straight to the Bottom"	4:41
12.	"Take Me Home"	5:50
Total length:		50:49

Bonus track version
No.	Title	Length
13.	"Wreck Me"	3:17
14.	"Hush"	3:49
15.	"Champagne (alt. version)"	3:39
Total length:		61:34

== Personnel ==
=== Cavo ===
- Casey Walker – lead vocals, lyrics
- Chris Hobbs – guitars, piano, backing vocals, lyrics
- Brian Smith – bass, backing vocals, lyrics
- Andy Herrin – drums, percussion, lyrics

=== Additional musicians ===
- Ryan Dellahousaye – strings
- Miggy Milla – background vocals
- Matt Noveskey – background vocals, additional percussion
- Kelsie Watts – background vocals

=== Gang vocals ===
- Reed Turner, Malia Livolsi, Casie Luong, Miggy Milla, Jody McCormick, Alyssa Ehrhard, Daniel Corder, Malee Bringardner, Kat Whitlock

=== Production ===
- Matt Noveskey – producer
- Kato Khandwala – mixer
- Fred Kevorkian – mastering
- Kevin Butler – engineer
- Robert Sewell – engineer
- Caleb Contreras – additional engineer
- Drew Millay – additional engineer

=== Design ===
- Rollow Welch – art direction
- C.C. Crow – artwork
