= Thick as Thieves (Cavo album) =

Studio album by Cavo
- Released: April 10, 2012
- Recorded: 2011–2012
- Genres: Hard rock; post-grunge
- Length: 41 minutes
- Label: Eleven Seven
- Producer: Kato Khandwala

Cavo chronology
Bright Nights Dark Days (2009)	Thick as Thieves (2012)	Bridges (2016)

Singles from Thick as Thieves
- 1. "Thick as Thieves" Released: 2011; 2. "Celebrity" Released: 2012; 3. "Circles" Released: 2012; 4. "War Within" Released: 2013; 5. "California" Released: 2013

Thick as Thieves is the second major-label and third studio album by American rock band Cavo, released on April 10, 2012 on Eleven Seven.

== Track listing ==
Thick as Thieves track listing
No.	Title	Length
1.	"Thick as Thieves"	3:34
2.	"Give It Away"	3:21
3.	"Hold Your Ground"	3:22
4.	"California"	3:34
5.	"Circles"	3:28
6.	"Celebrity"	3:28
7.	"Never Gonna Hurt"	4:07
8.	"War Within"	3:45
9.	"Last Day"	3:25
10.	"Run"	3:24
11.	"Southern Smile"	4:48
12.	"Ready to Go" (iTunes bonus track)	2:59

== Charts ==
Chart performance for Thick as Thieves
Chart (2012)	Peak position
US Billboard 200	96
US Top Alternative Albums (Billboard)	21
US Top Rock Albums (Billboard)	34
