= Angel Fire (Miscione novel) =

2002 book by Lisa Unger

- Author: Lisa Unger
- Language: English
- Genre: Crime fiction, Thriller
- Published: February 2002
- Publisher: Minotaur Books
- Publication place: United States

Angel Fire is a novel by bestselling author Lisa Unger writing as Lisa Miscione. It is the first book featuring Lydia Strong.

== Reception ==
The book received mixed reviews. Publishers Weekly described it as "gripping and terrifying right through the carnage of its final scene" and commended the novel's depictions of grisly scenes. Rex Klett, writing for Library Journal, praised the Unger's writing style and the book's suspense. However, Kirkus Reviews called it "predictable" and "flatly written", criticizing Lydia's characterization.
