= Flying Colors (Flying Colors album) =

- Cover art

Studio album by Flying Colors
- Released: March 26, 2012
- Recorded: January and March 2011
- Genres: Alternative rock, progressive rock, hard rock
- Length: 60:26
- Label: Mascot Label Group
- Producer: Peter Collins

Flying Colors chronology
Flying Colors (2012)	Second Nature (2014)

Professional ratings
Review scores
Source	Rating
Rock Hard (de)	8.5/10 stars
Sea of Tranquility	5/5 stars

Flying Colors is the debut studio album by the American supergroup Flying Colors, released on 26 March 2012. It debuted at No. 9 on Billboard's Hard Rock chart, and No. 11 on the BBC's Rock Album charts. The album art is based on the artwork Blown Away by artist and sculptor Jim Bond, as photographed by John Coombes.

== Background and writing ==
The band composed and recorded the album in just nine days in early 2011, during a short and intense session. Dave LaRue recalls, “It was quite an experience – the band moved at a fast pace, ideas flying around the room at all times. Sections of tunes were arranged, then re-arranged, ideas were tried every which way until we made them work, or, in some cases, discarded them altogether. Just keeping track of everything was a challenge!” McPherson adds, “This record is filled with trial and triumph. Raw and delicate songs alike amidst the swirling and daring orchestration of Steve, Neal, Mike and Dave. It’s been such an inspiring challenge melding folk, prog, pop, and metal all into one big recording.” In March 2011, a shorter second session was held to record final vocals and let Collins work out the final arrangement of the songs.

== True Colors ==
In 2017, the band released True Colors, the raw "unmastered" version direct from the mixing desk of Michael Brauer. The band reports this version to have "more detail, dynamics, and depth" as the original version was "taken prisoner in the loudness wars."

== Track listing ==
No.	Title	Length
1.	"Blue Ocean"	7:05
2.	"Shoulda Coulda Woulda"	4:32
3.	"Kayla"	5:20
4.	"The Storm"	4:53
5.	"Forever in a Daze"	3:56
6.	"Love Is What I'm Waiting For"	3:36
7.	"Everything Changes"	6:55
8.	"Better Than Walking Away"	4:57
9.	"All Falls Down"	3:22
10.	"Fool in My Heart"	3:48
11.	"Infinite Fire"	12:02

== Personnel ==
Flying Colors

- Steve Morse – lead and rhythm guitar
- Casey McPherson – Lead vocals, co-lead vocals (1, 3, 7, 10, 11)
- Neal Morse – keyboards, backing vocals, co-lead vocals (1, 3, 7, 11)
- Dave LaRue – bass guitar
- Mike Portnoy – drums, percussion, co-lead vocals on "Fool In My Heart"

Auxiliary Personnel

- Brian Moritz – Additional keyboard on Everything Changes
- Bill Evans – arrangement, strings

Production

- Bill Evans – executive producer, production engineer, cover art
- Peter Collins – producer
- Jerry Guidroz – recording engineer, studio engineer
- Brian Moritz – additional production
- Michael Brauer – mix engineer
- Howie Weinberg – mastering engineer
- Roy Koch – layout
