= Crash (Cavo song) =

Single by Cavo

from the album Bright Nights Dark Days
- Released: September 28, 2009
- Genre: Hard rock
- Length: 3:13
- Label: Reprise
- Songwriters: Thomas Henriksen; Bobby Huff; Zac Maloy

Cavo singles chronology
"Champagne" (2009)	"Crash" (2009)	"Let It Go" (2010)

"Crash" is Cavo's second single from their debut album, Bright Nights Dark Days.

== Music video ==
The music video for the song premiered in November 2009.

== Charts ==
Chart (2009)	Peak position
U.S. Billboard Mainstream Rock Tracks	6
U.S. Billboard Modern Rock Tracks	40
U.S. Billboard Rock Songs	20
