= Bright Nights Dark Days =

Studio album by Cavo
- Released: August 11, 2009
- Recorded: 2009
- Genre: Hard rock; post-grunge
- Length: 38:25
- Label: Reprise
- Producer: David Bendeth

Cavo chronology
Champagne (2008)	Bright Nights Dark Days (2009)	Crash Live (2010)

Singles from Bright Nights Dark Days
- 1. "Champagne" Released: March 17, 2009; 2. "Crash" Released: September 28, 2009; 3. "Let It Go" Released: 2010; 4. "My Little Secret" Released: June 22, 2010; 5. "Blame" Released: 2010; 6. "Cry Wolf" Released: 2010

Bright Nights Dark Days is Cavo's first major label (and second studio) album, released on August 11, 2009 on Reprise Records. It debuted at No. 47 on the Billboard 200.

The album received a three-star rating from AllMusic.

== Track listing ==
No.	Title	Length
1.	"Champagne"	3:07
2.	"Crash"	3:15
3.	"Let It Go"	3:46
4.	"Cry Wolf"	3:43
5.	"Ghost"	3:04
6.	"Blame"	3:17
7.	"My Little Secret"	4:09
8.	"Beautiful"	3:37
9.	"We All Fall Down"	3:18
10.	"Over Again"	3:27
11.	"Useless"	3:52
Total length:		38:25

== Charts ==
Chart (2009)	Peak position
Billboard 200	47
Billboard Rock Albums	13
Billboard Alternative Albums	10
Billboard Hard Rock Albums	3
