= New Morning (Alpha Rev album) =

Studio album by Alpha Rev
- Released: April 25, 2010
- Studio: Avatar (New York, New York)
- Genre: Alternative rock
- Label: Hollywood Records
- Producer: David Kahne

Alpha Rev chronology
The Greatest Thing I've Ever Learned (2007)	New Morning (2010)	Bloom (2013)

Singles from New Morning
- 1. "New Morning" Released: May 5, 2010; 2. "Phoenix Burn" Released: September 12, 2010

New Morning is the major label debut LP by Alpha Rev. The album was recorded at Avatar Studios in New York City and produced by David Kahne, engineered by Joe Barresi and mixed by Michael Brauer.

The single and title track "New Morning" has peaked at #100 on the Billboard Hot 100 on May 15, 2010. On May 1, 2010, the video debuted on the VH1 Top 20 Video Countdown. In all, "New Morning" spent 11 weeks on the countdown, peaking at the #7 position.

== Track listing ==
All songs written by Casey McPherson, except where noted.

1. "New Morning" - 3:45
2. "Phoenix Burn" (McPherson, Dwight Baker) - 3:34
3. "White Fences" (McPherson, Baker) - 2:56
4. "When Did I Wake Up" (McPherson, Baker) - 3:49
5. "Face Down" (McPherson, Derek Dunivan, Alex Dunlap, McKenzie Smith) - 3:29
6. "Get Out" (McPherson, Baker, Alex Dunlap, David Kahne) - 3:44
7. "Alone With You" - 3:12
8. "Colder Months" - 4:57
9. "Heaven" (McPherson, Dunlap) - 3:44
10. "Perfect Love" (McPherson, Baker) - 3:48
11. "Goodbye From the Start" - 3:55

Professional ratings
Review scores
Source	Rating
Allmusic	3.5/5 stars
