= Second Nature (Flying Colors album) =

- Cover art by Hugh Syme

Studio album by Flying Colors
- Released: September 29, 2014
- Genre: Progressive rock, hard rock
- Length: 65:58
- Label: Mascot Label Group
- Producer: Flying Colors

Flying Colors chronology
Flying Colors (2012)	Second Nature (2014)	Third Degree (2019)

Second Nature is the second studio album by the American supergroup Flying Colors, that was released in Europe on September 29, 2014, in the US on September 30, and in the UK on October 6. On August 19, Loudwire premiered the video for the album's first single "Mask Machine". Soon after, Classic Rock premiered the song for Europe. On September 22, the entire album began streaming on the Prog magazine website.

== Recording and concept ==
Before the album release, drummer Mike Portnoy said it would benefit from a bigger "chemistry" between members:

The first album was very much a blind date. This time there was an existing chemistry – we not only had the prior experiences of making the debut album, but also the 2012 tour as well. Direction was never discussed; we just did what we do.

The band's experience with Peter Collins was overwhelmingly positive. For Second Nature, the band decided not to work with a producer because they wanted to experiment with working on their own.

According to Portnoy, the album was recorded in a Led Zeppelin-ish way, with the members meeting for a couple of days, then carrying on with their other commitments, then going back to record more parts, and so on. The first writing session happened via Skype conversations.

Bassist Dave LaRue said about the writing sessions: "Everyone brings in ideas, no complete songs. When we like an idea, we start from there and build on it. There are some ideas that get thrown out, others that get completely changed, some that stay pretty much intact. We do try a lot of different ideas within one song. The writing sessions are pretty intense – we move fast, due to the limited amount of time we have".

Guitarist Steve Morse said he encourages his bandmates to bring just ideas for songs, instead of complete tracks, "so that the band sound is on everything". Also, he said the band decided not to "underestimate" their audience and assume they "can handle lots of subtlety, complexity and changes of tempo." All instruments were recorded in each member's personal studio, except for the vocals, which were mostly recorded at keyboardist/vocalist Neal Morse's studio.

The cover for Flying Colors was designed by executive producer Bill Evans. For Second Nature, Portnoy and Evans asked artist Hugh Syme to come up with something with the theme of "Second Nature". Steve Morse described the concept of the cover as follows:

Balloons are colorful flying machines, that are old, and haven’t changed much today, and the turbines symbolize a growing future of change for our energy, I guess. I think they both symbolize flying, or the movement in, or around the air. [...] [The butterfly] symbolizes metamorphosis... the 'second nature'. That a butterfly changes from one form to another.

== Song themes ==
The opening track "Open Up Your Eyes" was the first song to be written for the album. McPherson commented that the song is a reflection about life, and how one may not be happy even when have reasons to be.

"Mask Machine" was the first single from the album and received a video. McPherson stated that the song is his favorite and that he personally believes the chorus talks about "the record, in terms of our need to get away from consumerism and telling our boy to cover up who we really are".

"Bombs Away" is about getting involved in business everyday and losing sight of the beauty of life due to being busy.

"The Fury of My Love" was primarily written by Neal, who submitted a demo of the chorus for his bandmates. McPherson was initially afraid that the song could be mistaken as a song about domestic violence, and he describes it as actually covering simply the topic of the passion one feels for another.

"A Place in Your World" received a video, which was premiered at Billboard's website on 10 October 2014. The video consists of the band performing the song altogether in a studio, which Portnoy described as the band's "most natural and comfortable environment". He also said that the song is a good example of the Flying Colors sound: "catchy vocal hooks with clever, tasty musicianship sprinkled on top. It's also a great example of the Flying Colors vocal blend as it features lead vocal turns from all three vocalists (myself, Neal, and Casey) and a chorus that features a three-part harmony with all of us." According to McPherson, the song sees the album once again with existential, reflexive lyrics.

According to McPherson, the original chorus of "Lost Without You" may have been "Cause I'm home" instead of the "Cause I'm Lost" that was actually recorded. He also said the song speaks to the loved ones that he lost in his life.

The Celtic and "almost middle eastern/Indian approach" of "One Love Forever" made McPherson realize "how these tribes around the world have musical similarities that I hadn't really thought about until we did that verse." Steve says he used a style of playing that resembled European folk music.

McPherson describes "Peaceful Harbor" as "the journey of a man to finding a place where we'll find contentment. It's kind of a mix of what it's like to be a man and how we naturally take our journey." Steve adds that it is "about the joy of finding that peace inside after going through a storm or catastrophe". The initial version of the song didn't contain any choir at the outro, but Neal found out about a choir in Nashville and decided to hire them to complete the ending. The vocal melody of the song is reminiscent of their previous tour; it was something McPherson would sing during sound checks and that the band wanted to include in their next album.

"Cosmic Symphony" was written by McPherson towards "the person getting free of the trap of consumerism and how that relates to identity, [...] that person becoming comfortable on his own shoes." He also described the end of the song as a "I'm ok with who I am and I don't need anything else, I don't need to fill myself with things to purchase or to become, in order to describe who I am."

== Critical reception ==
The Prog Report called the album, "one of the best albums I’ve heard in a long time" and mentions Open Up Your Eyes as "the band's most powerful track to date" and "prog at its finest."

Professional ratings
Review scores
Source	Rating
Allmusic	3.5/5 stars
Metalholic	9/10 stars
Music Waves	4/5 stars

== Track listing ==
No.	Title	Length
1.	"Open Up Your Eyes"	12:24
2.	"Mask Machine"	6:06
3.	"Bombs Away"	5:03
4.	"The Fury of My Love"	5:10
5.	"A Place in Your World"	6:25
6.	"Lost Without You"	4:46
7.	"One Love Forever"	7:17
8.	"Peaceful Harbor"	7:01
9.	"Cosmic Symphony": I. "Still Life of the World"; II. "Searching for the Air"; III. "Pound for Pound""	11:46 3:15 2:58 5:33
Total length:		65:58

== Personnel ==
Flying Colors

- Casey McPherson – lead vocals, rhythm guitar
- Neal Morse – keyboards, backing vocals, co-lead vocals (1, 5, 7, 8, 9)
- Mike Portnoy – drums, percussion, co-lead vocals on "A Place In Your World"
- Steve Morse – lead and rhythm guitar
- Dave LaRue – bass guitar

Additional Personnel

- The McCrary Sisters – background vocals on "Peaceful Harbor" and "Cosmic Symphony"
- Chris Carmichael – strings on "The Fury of My Love" and "Peaceful Harbor"
- Shane Borth – strings on "Bombs Away"
- Eric Darken – hand drums on "One Love Forever"

Production

- Bill Evans – executive producer
- Flying Colors – producers
- Rich Mouser – mixing
- Jerry Guidroz, Bill Evans and Flying Colors – engineers
- Paul Logus – mastering
- Hugh Syme – art direction, design, illustrations
- Jim Arbogast – photography
