= Cavo =

American rock band

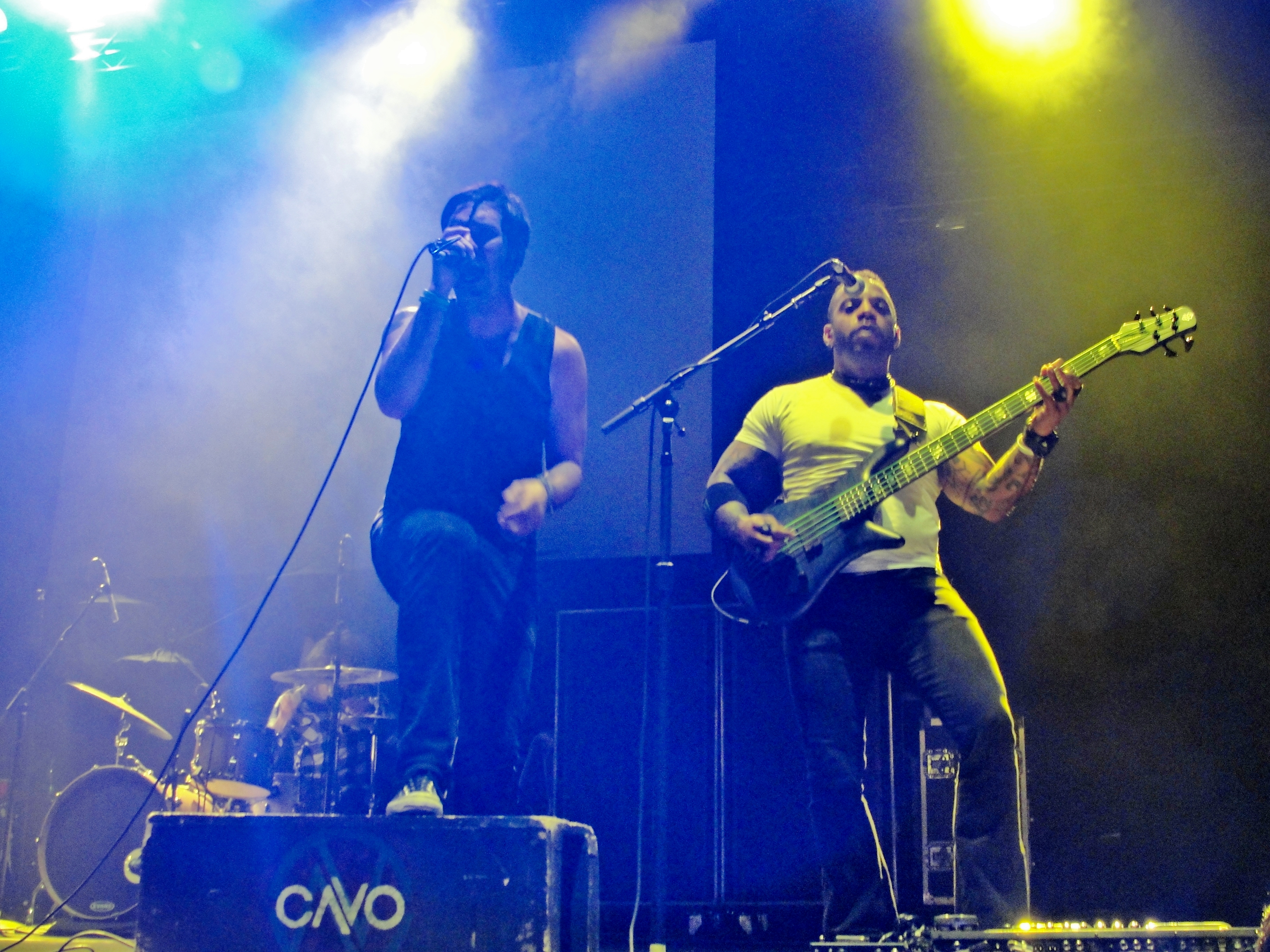
- Cavo performing at the Carnival of Madness tour in Laredo, Texas

Background information
- Origin: St. Louis, Missouri, U.S.
- Genres: Post-grunge; alternative rock
- Years active: 2001–present
- Labels: Eleven Seven; Reprise; Warner; Pavement
- Members: Casey Walker; Chris Hobbs; Brian Smith; Andy Herrin
- Past members: Mike Tomas; Ryan Kemp; Chad La Roy
- Website: cavomusic.com

Cavo is an American hard rock band from St. Louis, Missouri. Because of their sound and musical influences, they are sometimes classified as post-grunge as well as alternative rock.

== Band history ==
In late 2000, guitarist Chris Hobbs, bassist Ryan Kemp, and drummer Chad La Roy were searching for a vocalist for their band. With input from close friends Scott Gertken and Rich Criebaum of Modern Day Zero, the three auditioned then-unknown singer Casey Walker. By March 2001, Walker joined the band, and they adopted the name "Hollow". Soon after, Mike "Tomas" Tomasovich joined Hollow as a second guitarist. In 2001, Hollow released a three-song demo with the songs "Fallen", "State of Mind" and "Unsung". Near the end of 2001, the band changed their name to Cavo, which is the word "hollow" in Italian.

Cavo released their first EP, A Space to Fill, in 2002. The EP was produced by Scott Gertken and Rich Criebaum, recorded and mixed at the duo's Trailer Studios in Foristell, Missouri, and released through their Bullet 339 Records. Cavo began to grow a loyal fan base through their live shows, often playing on bills with Modern Day Zero. A Space to Fill spawned two singles that earned rotation on local radio stations in the St. Louis area. "Say Again" was picked up by WVRV and KNSX, and KPNT picked up the rock anthem "Unsung".

Cavo followed up the EP four years later with their self-released full length The Painful Art of Letting Go in September 2006. At that time, Ryan Kemp had left the band, with Brian Smith named as his replacement.

== Major label success ==
Cavo released a second EP, Champagne, in 2008. The track "Champagne" caught the attention of 105.7 KPNT in St. Louis, where the single was put into rotation. The success of "Champagne" earned Cavo an opening slot for Stone Temple Pilots, which was attended by label representatives from Warner Brothers Records. The band was signed to Warner/Reprise late in 2008. The group's major label debut, Bright Nights Dark Days, was released on August 11, 2009; Zac Maloy of The Nixons and Norwegian songwriting team Espionage worked with the group on songwriting, and the record was produced by David Bendeth. The re-released single "Champagne" reached No. 1 on the Billboard Mainstream Rock Charts and later, the single "Crash" (written by Tommy Henriksen, Bobby Huff and Zac Maloy) reached No. 6 on the Hot Mainstream Rock Tracks.

In 2009, their third single "Let It Go" was featured in the movie Transformers: Revenge of the Fallen and was made available on the soundtrack.

The band has toured with bands such as Halestorm, Rev Theory, Red, Chevelle, Daughtry, Lifehouse, Rains, Shinedown, Sick Puppies, Adelitas Way, The Veer Union, and Framing Hanley, and have played Crüe Fest, Carnival of Madness Carolina Rebellion, Rock on the Range and Rocklahoma to name a few of the many festivals played.

In 2010 after completing their tour with Daughtry and Lifehouse, Cavo hit the road for their very first headlining tour, with Black Sunshine, Shaman's Harvest, Atom Smash, Brookroyal and American Bang supporting. During this time, the band began writing for their next album. Several new songs - "Last Day", "Circles" and "Southern Smile" - were played in concert by the band.

== Thick as Thieves ==
On April 10, 2012, almost two years after the release its major label debut, Bright Nights Dark Days, Cavo released their album Thick as Thieves. The album, their first on independent rock label Eleven Seven Music, was produced by Kato Khandwala (Blondie, Drowning Pool) David Bendeth (Paramore, Papa Roach, Breaking Benjamin) and Dan Korneff (All That Remains, My Chemical Romance), and was recorded at House of Loud Studios in New Jersey.

In advance of the album proper, the music video for "Thick as Thieves" premiered on Yahoo! in late 2011 and was directed by Frankie Nasso, who has directed videos for Chevelle, RZA, Hellyeah, and All That Remains. The video features Cavo performing on a hi-rise rooftop in St. Louis. Additional footage - including the reality scenes featured with members of the band - was directed and edited by Bretten Cg, who produced and directed the behind the scenes for the "Thick as Thieves" video and the electronic press kits for the album Thick as Thieves.

In anticipation of the Thick as Thieves release, Cavo called on its fans to help finalize their cover art, and planned on the art to be a collage of candid band shots taken by fans. Artwork was revealed in early December 2011.

On July 26, 2012 Cavo made an announcement that Chad La Roy had decided to pursue other interests. A close friend to the band, Andy Herrin, filled in for the Carnival of Madness tour. "Chris, Brian, and myself (Casey) ARE continuing on as Cavo!!!" the statement said.

== Bridges ==
In October 2015 the band announced a release date of January 2016, for their third album entitled "Bridges". The band joined Meg Myers and Yelawolf for a sold-out show in their hometown of St.Louis, Missouri on October 23, 2015. The lead single, "Stay", was released in December 2015. Cavo celebrated the new album's release with a hometown show on January 29 at The Ready Room in St. Louis.

The band signed with Pavement Entertainment in 2017 and are releasing a deluxe edition of Bridges with three added songs.

On December 2, 2019 the band released a new single and music video for "Wolves".

In August 2024, it was announced that drummer Andy Herrin was out playing drums for Gin Blossoms.

2025 Cavo was in the studio working on new music to be released in 2026

== Members ==
Current

- Chris Hobbs – guitar, backing vocals (2000–present)
- Andy Herrin – drums (2012–present)
- Brian Smith – bass, backing vocals (2006–present)
- Casey Walker – lead vocals (2000–present)

Former

- Chad La Roy – drums (2000–2012)
- Michael (Tomas) Tomasovich – lead guitar (2001–2007)
- Ryan Kemp – bass (2000–2005)

== Discography ==
- The Painful Art of Letting Go (2006)
- Bright Nights Dark Days (2009)
- Thick as Thieves (2012)
- Bridges (2016)
- Bridges, Bright Nights and Thieves (2021)
- CAVO Covers Vol. 1 (2023)
- The Shakes EP (2023)
