= Dave LaRue =

American bassist (born 1956)

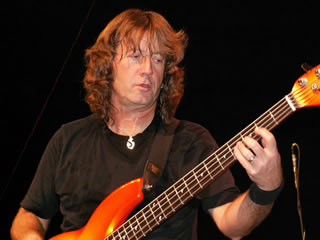

Background information
- Born: October 27, 1956 (age 69); East Brunswick, New Jersey, U.S.
- Genres: Progressive rock; progressive metal; jazz fusion; phonk
- Occupation: Bassist
- Instrument: Bass guitar
- Years active: 1978-present
- Member of: Steve Morse Band, Flying Colors
- Formerly of: Planet X, Dixie Dregs
- Website: www.davelarue.com

Dave LaRue is an American bassist who performed with the Dixie Dregs from 1988 to 2017 and with guitarist Steve Morse's Band since 1989. He also has worked with Dream Theater's John Petrucci, Mike Portnoy, Derek Sherinian and Jordan Rudess. He plays Music Man bass guitars, among them the "Grilver" and "StingRay 5 five-string" but has mainly switched to their "Bongo" line (which he was instrumental in helping develop) including four- and five-string fretted and fretless models. From March 2006 to September 2006, he toured with Joe Satriani on the Super Colossal tour. Most recently, LaRue became a member of the supergroup Flying Colors alongside long-time bandmate Steve Morse.

== Discography ==
=== Solo albums ===
- Hub City Kid (1992)

=== with Dixie Dregs ===
- Bring 'Em Back Alive (1992)
- Full Circle (1994)
- California Screamin' (2000)

=== with Steve Morse ===
- Southern Steel (1991)
- Coast to Coast (1992)
- Structural Damage (1995)
- StressFest (1996)
- Major Impacts (2000)
- Split Decision (2002)
- Major Impacts 2 (2004)
- Prime Cuts – From Steve Morse's Magna Carta sessions (compilation, 2005)
- Out Standing in Their Field (2009)

=== with Vinnie Moore ===
- The Maze (1999)
- Defying Gravity (2001)

=== with T Lavitz ===
- Extended Play (1984)
- Storytime (1986)
- From the West (1987)

=== with John Petrucci ===
- Suspended Animation (2005)
- G3: Live in Tokyo (2005)
- Terminal Velocity (2020)

=== with David Ragsdale ===
- David and Goliath (Renaissance Records, 1997)

=== with Joe Satriani ===
- Satriani Live! (2006)

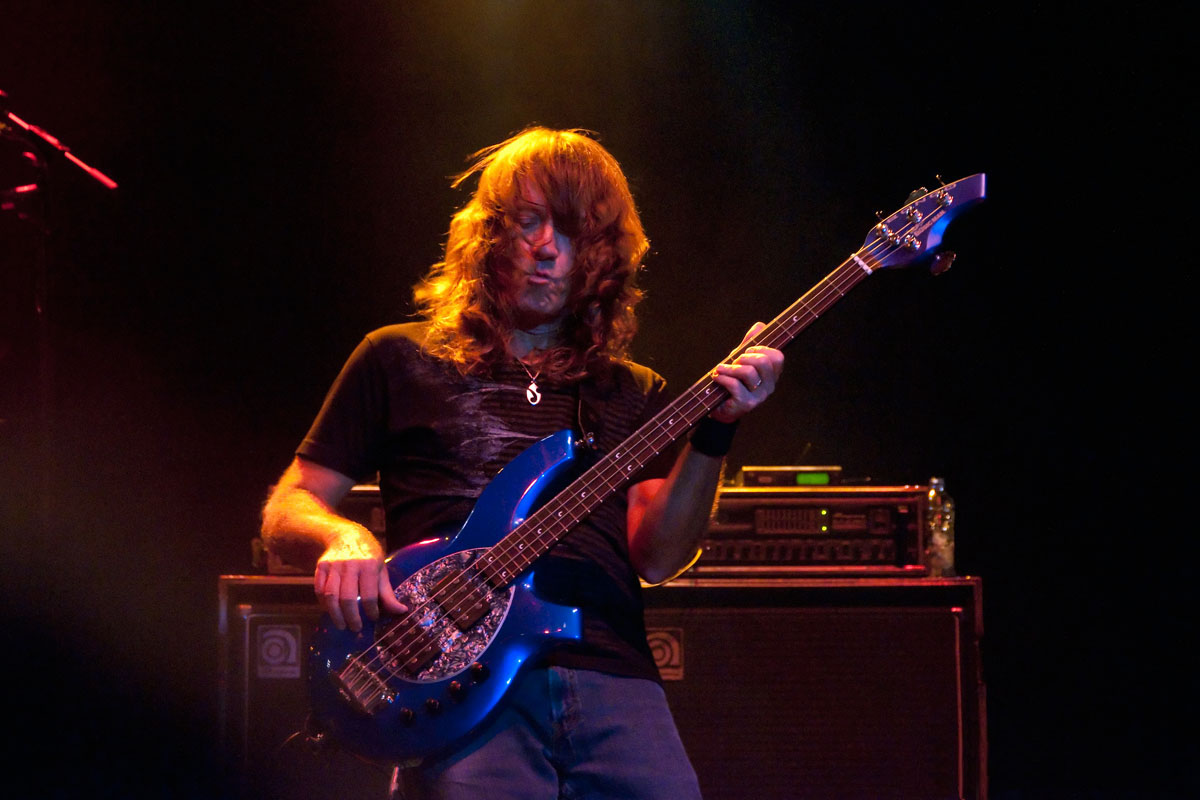
Dave playing with Flying Colors, 013, Tilburg (sept. 20., 2012)

=== with Flying Colors ===
- Flying Colors (2012)
- Live in Europe (2013)
- Second Nature (2014)
- Second Flight: Live at the Z7 (2015)
- Third Degree (2019)
- Third Stage: Live in London (2019)
- Morsefest 2019 (2019)

=== with Hammer of the Gods ===
- Two Nights in North America (2006)

=== with Jordan Rudess ===
- Rhythm of Time (2004)

=== Other Collaborations ===
- Mike Santiago & Entity - White Trees (1977)
- The Markley Band - On the Mark (1982)
- John Macey - Meltdown (1984)
- Stretch – Stretch (1984)
- Glen Burtnik - Talking in Code (1986)
- Scott Stewart & the Other Side - Scott Stewart & the Other Side (1987)
- Planet X - Live From Oz (2002)
- Balance II - Balance II (2005)

=== DVD ===
- Steve Morse - Sects, Dregs & Rock 'n' Roll (2002)
- Steve Morse Band - Live In Baden-Baden Germany March 1990 (2005)
- John Petrucci - G3 Live in Tokyo (2005)
- Hammer of the Gods - Two Nights in North America (2006)
- Joe Satriani - Satriani Live! (2006)
