= Steve Schiltz =

- Born: March 31, 1978; Rochester, New York, U.S.
- Occupation: Musician · Songwriter · Composer · Producer
- Years active: 1999–present
- Genres: Indie rock · Alternative rock · Shoegaze · Dream pop · Indie folk · Garage rock revival
- Instruments: Guitar · Vocals · Drums · Piano · Bass
- Member of: Longwave · Hurricane Bells · Harvard of the South · Wah Together · Blue October
- Website: Steve Schiltz

Steve Schiltz (born March 31, 1978) is an American musician, singer-songwriter, composer, record producer and multi-instrumentalist. He is the lead vocalist, guitarist and principal songwriter of the indie rock band Longwave and is also known for his solo project Hurricane Bells. He has worked extensively as a guitarist, songwriter, producer and composer, and has collaborated with artists including The Strokes, Albert Hammond Jr. and Blue October.

Schiltz began his musical career in the late 1990s and has subsequently worked across rock music, session recording, production and film and television composition.

== Early life ==
Steve Schiltz was born and raised in Rochester, New York, where he completed high school as his class's valedictorian. He was largely self-taught as a musician and became interested in pursuing music professionally during his final year of high school, when his band began performing at clubs and touring. After the band broke up, Schiltz chose not to attend college and moved to New York City shortly before his 20th birthday to pursue a career in music.

Before moving to New York City, he played guitar in the band Scout, which featured vocalist Ashen Keilyn.

== Longwave ==
In 1999 Schiltz moved to New York City and formed Longwave with guitarist Shannon Ferguson, bassist Dave Marchese and drummer Mike James. He served as the band's lead vocalist, guitarist and principal songwriter. Longwave developed an early following through performances at the Luna Lounge on Manhattan's Lower East Side and became associated with the city's early-2000s rock scene.

Longwave released its debut album, Endsongs, in 2000 on LunaSea Records, with Schiltz credited with vocals, guitar, songwriting and production.

The band signed with RCA Records in 2002 and worked with producer Dave Fridmann on The Strangest Things, released in 2003. Longwave subsequently toured extensively, including shows with The Strokes, The Vines, Bloc Party and OK Go.

Longwave released the Life of the Party EP in 2004, followed by There's a Fire in 2005 and Secrets Are Sinister in 2008, before entering a long hiatus.

Following the band's hiatus, Schiltz began working extensively as a touring and session musician, songwriter and producer. He toured with Albert Hammond Jr. and contributed guitar to Hammond's second studio album, ¿Cómo Te Llama?.

== Hurricane Bells and session work ==
In 2009 Schiltz established Hurricane Bells as a solo recording project. Its debut album, Tonight Is the Ghost, was released through Vagrant Records that year. Schiltz recorded Tonight Is the Ghost largely by himself at home, performing the instruments and engineering the recordings.

The song "Monsters" was subsequently included on the soundtrack to The Twilight Saga: New Moon, bringing wider attention to Hurricane Bells. The soundtrack reached number one on the Billboard 200. Schiltz subsequently assembled Hurricane Bells as a live band and toured internationally.

During the following years, Schiltz became increasingly active as a session guitarist, songwriter and producer. He has performed or recorded with artists including The Pierces, James Iha, Dan Wilson, James Bay and Albert Hammond Jr..

His session and production work has included guitar, bass, drums, piano, synthesizers and percussion, as well as production and mixing.

== Blue October and Harvard of the South ==
Schiltz began collaborating with Blue October during the recording of Any Man in America in 2011, contributing guitar to the album. He subsequently became a regular collaborator, contributing guitar, vocals and songwriting to the band's recordings. His songwriting credits include "I Hope You're Happy", "This Is What I Live For", "Fight for Love" and "Change".

Schiltz was also involved in Harvard of the South, a project formed with Blue October members Justin Furstenfeld, Jeremy Furstenfeld and Matt Noveskey. The group released its self-titled album in 2020, with Schiltz contributing vocals, guitar, songwriting, production and mixing.

In 2023, after more than a decade of collaboration with Blue October, Schiltz joined the band as a full-time member.

== Composition and production ==
Alongside his work as a performer, Schiltz has composed music for film and television. His credits include theme music for the television series In the Dark and music for I Think You Should Leave with Tim Robinson.

Schiltz has also composed scores for independent films and documentaries, including Stephanie in the Water (2013), Another World (2014) and the science-fiction short film Voskhod (2015).

His work has also included music for television advertising and commercial projects.

== Later projects ==
Longwave reunited in 2018 and released If We Ever Live Forever in 2019, followed by the live release Live at Bowery Ballroom in 2020.

Schiltz revived Hurricane Bells in 2020, releasing There's Nothing Precious in the Past that year and the instrumental album Our World Is 3D in 2021.

In June 2021 Schiltz filled in for Nick Valensi during The Strokes' performance at Irving Plaza in New York City.

In 2022 Schiltz formed the experimental group Wah Together with bassist Phil Mossman (formerly of LCD Soundsystem), drummer Vito Roccoforte (The Rapture), and vocalist Jaiko Suzuki (Electroputas). The group released its debut album, Let's Wah Together, on Dedstrange on 4 March 2022, with Schiltz contributing guitar, songwriting and mixing.

In 2026 Schiltz replaced Nick Valensi during The Strokes' Reality Awaits touring schedule while Valensi took a temporary break from the band's scheduled tour dates. The band described Schiltz as an old friend from its early New York days.

== Discography ==
=== Longwave ===
- Endsongs (2000)
- The Strangest Things (2003)
- There's a Fire (2005)
- Secrets Are Sinister (2008)
- If We Ever Live Forever (2019)
- Live at the Bowery Ballroom (2020)

=== Hurricane Bells ===
- Tonight Is the Ghost (2009)
- There's Nothing Precious in the Past (2020)
- Our World Is 3D (2021)

=== Harvard of the South ===
- Harvard of the South (2020)

=== Wah Together ===
- Let's Wah Together (2022)

=== Blue October ===
- Any Man in America (2011)
- Sway (2013)
- Home (2016)
- I Hope You're Happy (2018)
- This Is What I Live For (2020)
- Spinning the Truth Around (2022–2023)
