= Tremont Music Hall =

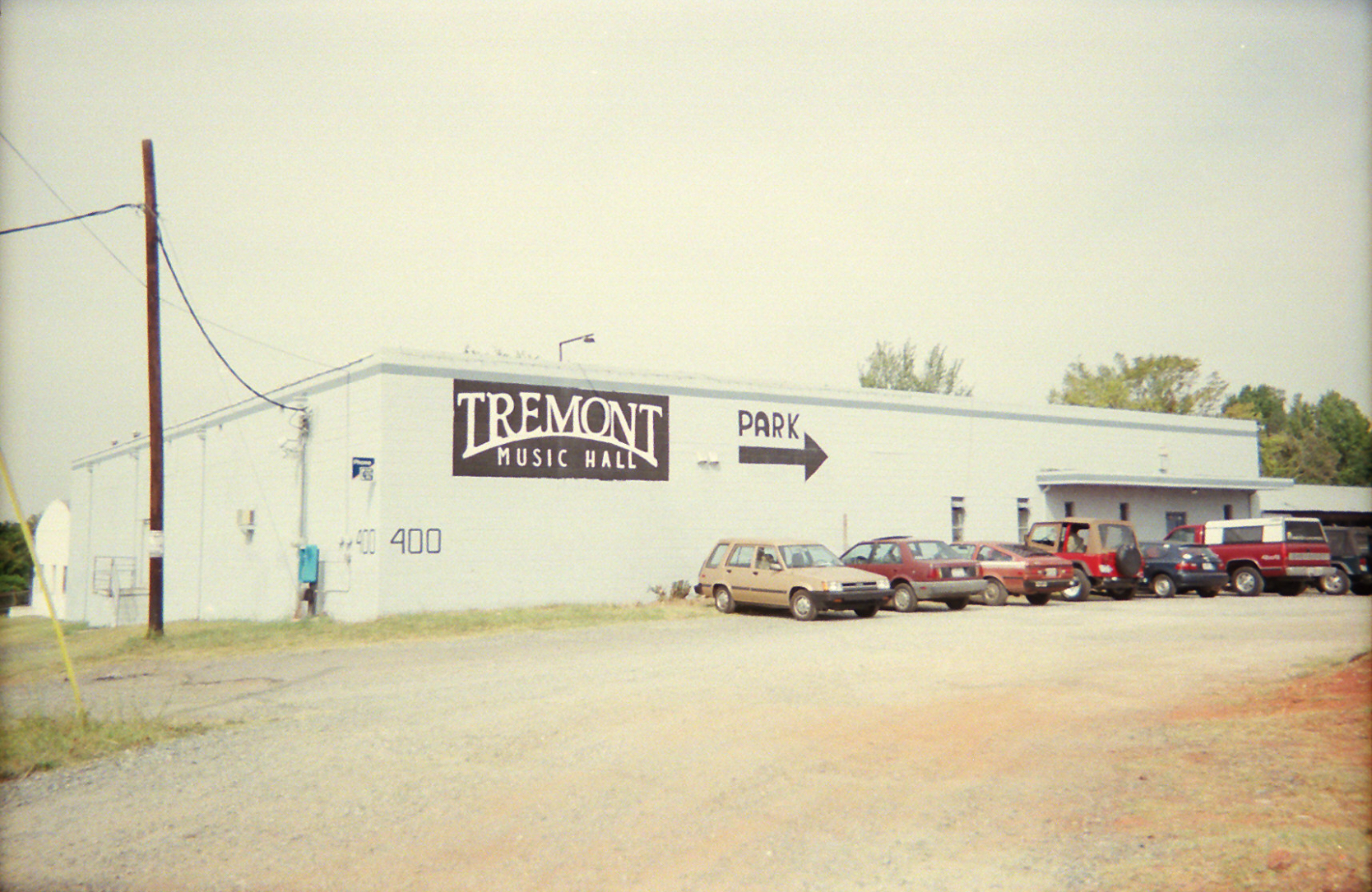
- Tremont Music Hall, 23rd Sept 1997
- Interactive map of Tremont Music Hall
- Address: 400 West Tremont Ave
- Location: Charlotte, North Carolina 28203
- Coordinates: 35.211142°N 80.866594°W
- Capacity: 1000 (main hall)/350 (casbah)
- Type: Music Club

Construction
- Opened: 1995
- Closed: December 19th, 2015

Tremont Music Hall was a music venue located near downtown Charlotte, North Carolina. The name was based on its address 400 West Tremont Ave. Most shows were all-ages, but the venue had a full-service bar that served beer and liquor. The venue opened in 1995 and became one of the premier venues for independent/metal/alternative bands in the Southeast. It closed on December 19, 2015.

== Description ==
Tremont Music Hall's Main Hall was located on the north side of the building. The Main Hall had been used for larger/national touring acts, featuring a PA/monitor and light system. The Casbah was a smaller stage located against the southern wall of the building closer to the bar. The Casbah was used several nights a week for smaller, local and regional shows as well as dance parties and club events. Typical bills had 3-4 bands, with doors opening at 7:00 and showtime at 8:00. The Casbah sported the main hall's old FOH sound board, and an up-to-date monitor system. There was also a dedicated, but limited lighting system, including club lighting on the floor. In addition to the two stages, some shows were performed outdoors in the parking lot and in a shed.

== History ==
Penny Craver, former owner of the Milestone Club, and Erik Christesen, opened Tremont Music Hall in early 1995. Before becoming a music venue, the building was occupied by a shampoo manufacturing firm and a construction supply facility. It had a capacity of 400-500 upon opening. It was originally scheduled to open on February 3rd, 1995 with a concert by Sebadoh, but the opening had to be pushed back due to complications with city regulations. The opening was rescheduled to February 10th, and was planned to feature three local metal bands; Seducer, Ethoriah, and Blak Urth. However, this show was also cancelled, as no agreement with city officials had been made. On March 17th, Southern Culture on the Skids and opening band Tweaker became the first bands to play the venue.

On December 13th 1996, The Casbah opened with a concert by Jonathan Fire*Eater. This smaller venue was intended to host concerts by local bands and smaller touring acts. The room was designed by local artists Hope Nicholls and Scott Weaver.

Penny Craver stepped down as owner of the venue in September of 2004 to focus on her restaurant, selling the venue to Liquid Recordz owner Dave Ogden. Ogden sold the venue in 2010 to John Hayes. In 2015, the building's property owners decided to close and sell the venue due to redevelopment in the area. The venue hosted its final show on December 19, 2015 and the building was demolished on July 10, 2017.

== Concerts ==
List of concerts by notable artists at the venue
Date	Artist	Details
March 17th, 1995	Southern Culture on the Skids	Tweaker opened; first show at Tremont
March 29th, 1995	Sons of Elvis	Benday Dot opened
April 5th, 1995	Mojo Nixon	The Furies opened
April 15th, 1995	Stuck Mojo	Candy Pig opened
April 21st, 1995	The Murder Junkies	The Irritations and The Spo-Its opened
May 12th, 1995	Pavement	2nd Skin opened
May 13th, 1995	Inch	The Furies and Sticky opened
June 8th, 1995	Deicide	Broken Hope and Demonic Christ opened
June 14th, 1995	Kix	
June 16th, 1995	Antiseen	Hellstompers and Branded opened
June 20th, 1995	New Bomb Turks	Showcase Showdown opened
July 7th, 1995	The Veldt	Moonburn and Minerva Strain opened
July 8th, 1995	Jolene	Zen Frisbee and Black Hole Radio opened
July 12th, 1995	Nik Turner's Space Ritual	Simon House's Spiral Realms opened
July 14th, 1995	Archers of Loaf	Sugarsmack opened
July 20th, 1995	Morbid Angel	Grip Inc and Seducer opened
July 23rd, 1995	Lycia	Trance to the Sun opened
July 29th, 1995	Squirrel Nut Zippers	Snapdragon opened
August 4th, 1995	Apparatus	Weedeater opened
August 10th, 1995	Boiled in Lead	Gael Warning opened
August 11th, 1995	Stuck Mojo	Child of Rage opened
August 12th, 1995	Sugarsmack	Drunken Boat and Harvey Milk opened; Yesha Records showcase
August 16th, 1995	Cub	
September 2nd, 1995	The Meditations	
September 3rd, 1995	Death of Summer '95	Apparatus, Deity 5000, Iodine, Üblisch, Laburnum, The Ravelers, Flood, and The Carriers performed
September 9th, 1995	Dillon Fence	Starbilly opened
September 15th, 1995	Lustre	Laburnum and Green Sect opened
September 17th, 1995	Seam	Spent and Engine 88 opened
September 22nd, 1995	The Veldt	Toast opened
September 26th, 1995	Chris Duarte	
September 30th, 1995	Squirrel Nut Zippers	The Backsliders opened
October 5th, 1995	Cake	Danielle Howle and the Tantrums opened
October 15th, 1995	Suzanne Westenhoefer	
October 17th, 1995	Neurosis	
October 19th, 1995	Steve Riley and the Mamou Playboys	
October 21st, 1995	Jolene	Backsliders opened
October 24th, 1995	Smile	For Love Not Lisa opened
October 28th, 1995	Janis Ian	Todd Busch opened
October 29th, 1995	Man or Astro-man?	Dipole Moment opened
November 1st, 1995	Palace	Mommyheads opened
November 3rd, 1995	Southstage Music Showcase	East Orange, Iodine, Backsliders, Baby Fat, and Danielle Howle and the Tantrums performed
November 4th, 1995	Southstage Music Showcase	Zen Frisbee, Toast, Muscadine, Kathleen Turner Overdrive, and Laburnum performed
November 15th, 1995	Human Drama	Trio Nocturna opened
November 16th, 1995	Tony Trischka	The Ruffians opened
November 17th, 1995	Donkey	Bryan Shumate and James Hoover opened
November 18th, 1995	Flat Duo Jets	Red Aunts opened
November 25th, 1995	Supernova	Red Star Bellgrade opened
November 29th, 1995	Band de Solei w/ Michelle Malone	Jay Garrigan opened
December 2nd, 1995	Tiny Lights	
December 14th, 1995	Seven Mary Three	Lustre and
December 22nd, 1995	Squirrel Nut Zippers	
December 29th, 1995	Jolene	electro-LUXE and Lily Montero opened
December 31st, 1995	Sugarsmack	Muscadine opened
January 12th, 1996	Ben Folds Five	
January 17th, 1996	Into Another	Sense Field opened
January 21st, 1996	Luna	Bedhead opened
January 26th, 1996	Archers of Loaf	Sticky opened
February 9th, 1996	The Mermen	Moonburn opened
February 13th, 1996	Leftover Salmon	
February 16th, 1996	Ani DiFranco	
February 17th, 1996	Flat Duo Jets	Danielle Howle and the Tantrums opened
February 20th, 1996	Hum	Mercury Rev opened
February 22nd, 1996	Hobex	
February 27th, 1996	Supernova	Naked Angels opened
February 28th, 1996	Son Volt	Marlee MacLeod
February 29th, 1996	Buzzoven	Sourvein opened
March 1st, 1996	Harvey Milk	Pipe and Trucker opened
March 2nd, 1996	The Veldt	Latino Chrome and Dipole Moment opened
March 6th, 1996	The Bogmen	Neglected Sheep and The Brian Hartzog Band opened
March 7th, 1996	Frank Black	Jonny Polonsky opened
March 9th, 1996	Velvet Crush	Lustre opened
March 11th, 1996	Rancid	Rocket from the Crypt and The Suicide Machines opened
March 22nd, 1996	Southern Culture on the Skids	The Swingin' Neckbreakers opened
March 23rd, 1996	Fugazi	
March 24th, 1996	Cindytalk	Mistle Thrush and Trance to the Sun opened
March 27th, 1996	7 Year Bitch	Sixteen Deluxe opened
April 7th, 1996	The Nixons	For Squirrels and Lustre opened
April 10th, 1996	Poi Dog Pondering	A Great Laugh opened
April 12th, 1996	Superchunk	Verbena opened
April 16th, 1996	3lb Thrill	
April 26th, 1996	Cris Williamson	Tret Fure opened
April 28th, 1996	Bloodlet	Deadguy and 454 Big Block opened
May 2nd, 1996	Ruby	Schtum opened
May 3rd, 1996	Acumen	Nature and Apparatus opened
May 4th, 1996	June	Shallow and Super Deluxe opened
May 10th, 1996	The Veldt	Latino Chrome and Whiskeytown opened
May 16th, 1996	Grifters	Eddy opened
May 19th, 1996	Christ Analogue	Insight 23 and Apparatus opened
May 26th, 1996	Lagwagon	Screw 32
May 29th, 1996	Jewel	Duncan Sheik opened
June 2nd, 1996	Jolene	
June 7th, 1996	Squirrel Nut Zippers	
June 17th, 1996	Biohazard	D.F.L. opened
June 20th, 1996	Sheep on Drugs	
June 22nd, 1996	For Squirrels	Gus opened
June 27th, 1996	Sunshine Blind	Deep Endye opened
June 29th, 1996	Electrafixion	The Elevator Drops opened
July 3rd, 1996	Attrition	
July 6th, 1996	I Mother Earth	Solution A.D. and Tonic opened
July 13th, 1996	Kostars	Expanding Man and Sincola
July 14th, 1996	Clutch	Orange 9mm and Core opened
July 16th, 1996	My So-Called Band	
July 23rd, 1996	Self	The Drag and Gumption opened
July 24th, 1996	Seven Mary Three	Poe and The Refreshments opened
August 2nd, 1996	Madball	Obey Bizar and Ethoriah opened
August 20th, 1996	The Blue Dogs	
August 22nd, 1996	Christian Death	Switchblade Symphony and The Big Electric Cat opened
August 23rd, 1996	No Use for a Name	Ten Foot Pole and Pest opened
September 6th, 1996	Squirrel Nut Zippers	
September 13th, 1996	Neurosis	Bloodlet opened
September 17th, 1996	Man or Astro-Man?	
October 3rd, 1996	Chixdiggit	Lodestar opened
October 5th, 1996	Black Sabbath Night	Latino Chrome, Seducer, and a band composed of Sugarsmack and Muscadine members performed
October 11th, 1996	Jason & the Scorchers	The Backsliders opened
October 18th, 1996	Southern Culture on the Skids	Shark Quest and
October 19th, 1996	Semisonic	Muscadine opened
October 23rd, 1996	Soul Coughing	Jeremy Enigk opened
October 24th, 1996	Genitorturers	
