= Collapsis =

American band

- Origin: Chapel Hill, North Carolina
- Genres: Rock
- Years active: 1997–2001, 2013 (reunion), intermittently since
- Label: Cherry/Universal
- Members: Mike Garrigan, Scott Carle, Ryan Pickett, Chris Holloway
- Past members: John Gillespie, James Adair

Collapsis was a band from Chapel Hill, North Carolina, active primarily from 1997 to 2001. The band's name derives from a Dillon Fence song of the same name that Collapsis front man Mike Garrigan asked Dillon Fence front man Greg Humphreys' blessing to use as the band's moniker.

== History ==
In 1996, singer/songwriter Mike Garrigan recorded and released his second full-length album, The Lessons of Autumn. The album departed from its predecessor, Building A Hole, by incorporating instrumentation beyond acoustic guitar, including a full-band sound on several songs. The album increased Garrigan's popularity in the Chapel Hill/Triangle-area music scene and gained the attention of industry A&R reps. Garrigan soon began working with former Dillon Fence drummer Scott Carle, planting the seeds for what would later become Collapsis.

In 1998, Collapsis released The Chartreuse EP, and gained a significant following in North Carolina and throughout the southeastern United States. The band then signed to Cherry Entertainment (a subsidiary of Universal Records). Collapsis' lone major-label offering, Dirty Wake, was released Feb. 15, 2000, and the album's lead single, "Automatic", peaked at #28 on the Billboard Modern Rock in 2000.

Collapsis also wrote the title song to the movie Clay Pigeons, titled "Clay Pigeons: The Ballad of Lester Long." The song was a light and humorous paean to going on a murder spree.

Their song "Wonderland" was featured on Beer Bad, an episode of Buffy the Vampire Slayer, in a scene where characters Willow and Parker were chatting.

In 2001, Mike Garrigan became a member of the band Athenaeum and, after its disbanding, went on to form the group mg4. In 2003, Ryan Pickett began working with My Morning Jacket and remains the band's front-of-house sound engineer. Scott Carle has performed with most, if not all, Triangle-area bands and musicians, and has appeared in 10 or so R and PG films. Following Collapsis' disbanding, Chris Holloway became a chef and, after a nearly two-decade hiatus from the music industry, released a solo record, Swarming in the Glow, in 2019.

== Members ==
- Mike Garrigan: vocals and guitar
- Scott Carle: drums and percussion (a former member of Dillon Fence)
- Ryan Pickett: guitar and vocals (a former member of Queen Sarah Saturday, another North Carolina local band)
- Chris Holloway: bass and vocals (a former member of Queen Sarah Saturday)
