= Strangest Thing =

Strangest Thing or variants may refer to:

- "Strangest Thing", by Grant Lee Philips from Hung (television soundtrack)
- "Strangest Thing", a song by War on Drugs from A Deeper Understanding
- "The Strangest Thing", by George Michael from Older
- The Strangest Things album by American indie rock band Longwave 2003
- "Strangest Things", song by Longwave from The Strangest Things
