= Pocket Full of Fire: Gangstagrass Live =

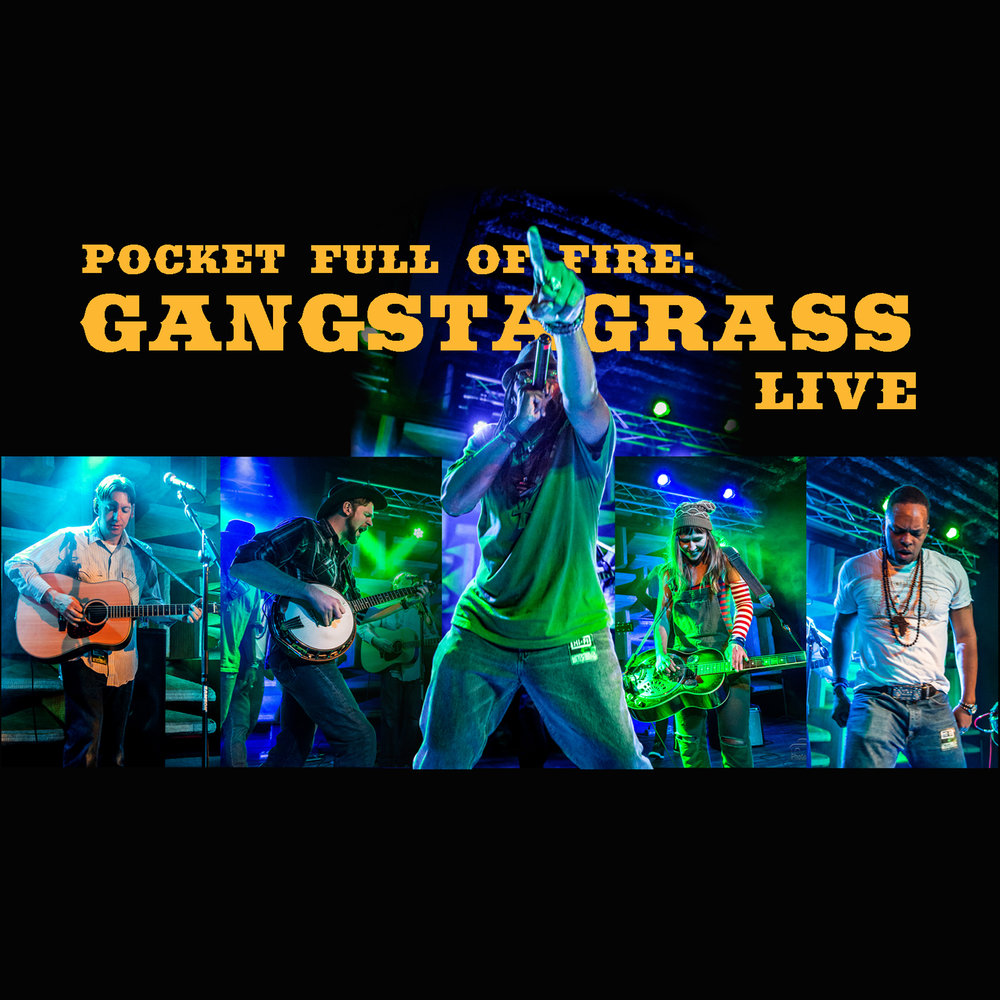

Live album by Gangstagrass
- Released: February 15, 2019
- Recorded: March 2018
- Venues: Hi-Fi, Indianapolis, Indiana; Atomic Cowboy, St Louis, Missouri; Space, Chicago, Illinois; Willie's Locally Known, Lexington, Kentucky; Motorco, Durham, North Carolina; Geneseo Riviera, Geneseo, New York
- Genres: Bluegrass; hip hop; country
- Length: 57:37
- Label: Rench Audio
- Producer: Rench (Oscar Owens)

Pocket Full of Fire: Gangstagrass Live features tracks recorded in six venues across the United States by New York City based bluegrass rap group Gangstagrass during their Pocket Full of Fire tour in 2018.

In January 2019 Rolling Stone named “Keep Talking (Live)” one of the "10 Best Country and Americana Songs to Hear Now".

== Track listing ==
No.	Title	Venue	Length
1.	"Barnburning"	Hi-Fi (Indianapolis)	4:15
2.	"Keep Talking"	Atomic Cowboy (St Louis)	4:21
3.	"You Can Never Go Home Again"	Space (Chicago)	4:52
4.	"Red River"	Motorco (Durham)	4:11
5.	"Nowhere to Run"	Space (Chicago)	4:51
6.	"Long Grey River"	Geneseo Riviera (Geneseo)	4:22
7.	"Gunslinging Rambler"	Space (Chicago)	5:28
8.	"Bound to Ride"	Hi-Fi (Indianapolis)	5:02
9.	"Home"	Willie's Locally Known (Lexington)	5:33
10.	"All for One"	Motorco (Durham)	3:44
11.	"Will the Circle Be Unbroken"	Space (Chicago)	5:09
12.	"Ain't No Stopping"	Motorco (Durham)	5:49
Total length:			57:37

== Personnel ==
- Rench (Oscar Owens): vocals/guitar/beats
- Dolio The Sleuth (Durant Lawrence): vocals
- R-Son The Voice of Reason (Randy Green): vocals
- Dan Whitener: vocals/banjo
- Landry McMeans: vocals/dobro
