= Radiance (Athenaeum album) =

Studio album by Athenaeum
- Released: 1998
- Recorded: January 1997
- Studio: Master Control, Burbank, California
- Genre: Pop, pop rock
- Label: Atlantic
- Producer: Gavin McKillop

Athenaeum chronology
Athenaeum (1995)	Radiance (1998)	Athenaeum (2001)

Radiance is the debut album by the American band Athenaeum, released in 1998. "What I Didn't Know" and "Flat Tire" were released as singles. The band supported the album with a North American tour.

== Production ==
Produced by Gavin McKillop, the album was recorded in January 1997 at Master Control Studios in Burbank, California; Athenaeum admired McKillop's work with Toad the Wet Sprocket. It is named for a street in the band's hometown of Greensboro, North Carolina. The majority of the album's songs, which are primarily about romantic relationships, were written over a period of four year by frontman Mark Kano. Some of the songs first appeared on the band's 1995 independent album. Athenaeum was influenced by the Sex Pistols and fellow North Carolina band Dillon Fence. Greg Leisz played pedal steel on "Spotlight". Radiance's release was delayed so that the band could remix all of the tracks.

== Critical reception ==
Professional ratings
Review scores
Source	Rating
AllMusic	3/5 stars
Robert Christgau	(dud)
The Indianapolis Star	2.5/4 stars
Winston-Salem Journal	2.5/4 stars

Billboard said that Radiance "will surely be considered one of the best albums of 1998, its instantly arresting tunefulness buttressed by a broody but bracing lyrical and instrumental momentum". The Rocky Mountain News stated that it contained "immediately accessible pop gems with ringing guitars and hooks as solid as granite". The Wisconsin State Journal called it "one of the most radio-ready debuts of the year... It's hooky and familiar".

The Daily Press stated that the band "quartet plays well-crafted guitar pop that's closer in style and attitude to California's Toad the Wet Sprocket than to any of the Tobacco Road rockers." The Indianapolis Star opined that Athenaeum "churns out a pop-infested, gratifying form of rock that emulates [Matthew] Sweet at times." Stereo Review concluded that "the bottom line is that Athenaeum's well-manicured pop/rock is lissome, likable, and ear-catching." The Winston-Salem Journal panned the production, likening the sound to "aural wallpaper".

== Track listing ==
No.	Title	Length
1.	"What I Didn't Know"
2.	"Flat Tire"
3.	"On My Mind"
4.	"Lifeline"
5.	"Spotlight"
6.	"Away"
7.	"Unnoticed"
8.	"No One"
9.	"So Long"
10.	"Different Situation"
11.	"Anyone"
12.	"Radiance"
