= Top loader =

Top loader, toploader, or top-loader may refer to:

- Toploader, an English alternative rock band from Eastbourne formed in 1997
- Top Loader, a 1993 album by Sugarsmack
- Ford Toploader transmission, a manually shifted three and four speed gearbox introduced in 1964 by the Ford Motor Company
- a rigid, plastic card protector

The term top loader may also be used to distinguish versions of machines with the loading mechanism at the top from other configurations (e.g. front-loading):-

- Nintendo Entertainment System (Model NES-101) (also known as the Top loader), a redesign of the NES game console named for its modified cartridge mechanism
- Videocassette recorders with the cassette-loading mechanism on the top surface
- Top-loading washing machine, a washing machine design

== See also ==
- Loader (equipment)
