= Living Room Scene =

Studio album by Dillon Fence
- Released: 1994
- Studio: Ardent
- Genre: Rock
- Label: Mammoth/Atlantic
- Producer: Mark Freegard

Dillon Fence chronology
Outside In (1993)	Living Room Scene (1994)	Live at the Cat's Cradle (2001)

Living Room Scene is an album by the American band Dillon Fence, released in 1994. It was the band's final studio album; half the band left shortly after its release, forcing singer Greg Humphreys and drummer Scott Carle to support it with two new touring musicians. The title track, about living in a college town, was the first single.

== Production ==
The bulk of the album was recorded over six weeks at Ardent Studios, in Memphis, Tennessee. It was produced by Mark Freegard. "Fayetteville", the closing instrumental track, was written by Humphreys and performed by his grandmother on her Young Chang piano. "High School Sap" is an instrumental.

== Critical reception ==
Professional ratings
Review scores
Source	Rating
AllMusic	3/5 stars
The Charlotte Observer	3.5/4 stars
Music Week	4/5 stars
The Tampa Tribune	2.5/4 stars

Trouser Press wrote that "Humphreys exercises a raspy Rod Stewart voice (which he intimated on Outside In) and a fat ’70s Gibson SG tone on the title track, then downplays both in the cushy electric soul folds of 'Laughs' and the squalling harmony pop of 'Queen of the In-Between'." The Washington Post opined that "the band's most memorable songs tend to be its most derivative ones: 'Coffee Cup' begins with singer Greg Humphreys emulating Rod Stewart, while 'Unnoticed' bears more than a passing resemblance to the Church."

The State called the album "superb," writing that Dillon Fence's music "is catchy, edgy and often Beatlesque." The Record praised the "spontaneity and looseness" of the music, stating that on "Laughs" "Humphreys' vocals and layered background harmonies float amid turbulent rhythm guitars." The Richmond Times-Dispatch stated: "Three-part harmonies, husky to screechy lead vocals, jangling or dense guitar tracks and propulsive drumming make for a fine pop and rock listen."

AllMusic wrote that the album "combines some absolutely stellar '90s power-pop with tasty, '70s, stud-rock guitars and a big dollop of blue-eyed soul."

== Track listing ==
No.	Title	Length
1.	"Living Room Scene"
2.	"Laughs"
3.	"Queen of the In-Between"
4.	"The Right Road"
5.	"Unnoticed"
6.	"High School Sap"
7.	"Day After Tomorrow"
8.	"Where's Your Kiss"
9.	"Coffee Cup"
10.	"Stranded"
11.	"Turnstile"
12.	"Chain Letter"
13.	"Fayetteville"

== Personnel ==
- Kent Alphin – guitar
- Scott Carle – drums
- Chris Goode – bass
- Greg Humphreys – vocals, guitar
