= Galaxie 500 (disambiguation) =

Galaxie 500 was an American alternative rock band that formed in 1987.

Galaxie 500 may also refer to:

- Galaxie (band), Francophone indie garage rock band originally known as Galaxie 500
- Ford Galaxie, full-sized car which included models designated Galaxie 500
- Galaxy 500 (album), studio album by the American band Fetchin Bones
- "Galaxy 500", a song from the 2002 album Lucky 7 by The Reverend Horton Heat
