= Nic Brown (drummer) =

- Occupations: Musician; Author
- Instrument: Drums
- Years active: 1990–present
- Formerly of: Athenaeum; Longwave; Skeleton Key
- Website: www.nicbrown.net

Nic Brown is an American rock drummer and author from North Carolina. He began his career drumming with his high school rock band, Athenaeum, who went on to sign with Atlantic Records and release a hit single, "What I Didn't Know". Brown left Athenaeum in 2001 and played in Longwave and Skeleton Key in the decade of the 2000s while pursuing a career change to become a professional writer. He has released three novels and a memoir since 2009. As of 2025 he is a professor of English at Clemson University.

== Music career ==
Brown co-founded Athenaeum in 1990 with singer Mark Kano while he was an eighth-grader in Greensboro, North Carolina. The group signed with Atlantic Records and released the album Radiance in 1998, which included the alternative radio hit "What I Didn't Know". He toured with the group through the end of the 1990s, and announced his departure in January 2001, after recording drums for (but before the release of) their second, self-titled album. In his 2023 memoir, Bang Bang Crash, Brown notes that he grew disenchanted with the style of music he was playing nightly and wanted to explore new genres; he also regretted passing up acceptances to Ivy League colleges to pursue a career in music, and leaving the group allowed him to return to school. He took a bachelor's degree in creative writing at Columbia University, and while enrolled there played in several bands, including Longwave, Skeleton Key, and Falcon; he also performed or recorded with Ben Lee, Eszter Balint, Mike Garrigan, Claire Holley, Michael Hurley, and Matt Pond PA.

Brown has occasionally played reunion shows with Athenaeum, and was the impetus behind the group's 2018 reunion show in North Carolina on the occasion of Radiance's 20th anniversary.

== Writing career ==
After completing the bachelor's at Columbia, he enrolled in the Iowa Writer's Workshop, where he largely ceased performing as a musician and concentrated on writing. His first publication was Floodmarkers, a novel released in 2009, which was selected as an Editors' Choice by the New York Times Book Review. He followed up quickly with another novel, Doubles, in 2010. In 2015, his third novel, In Every Way, was published. His fourth book, 2023's Bang Bang Crash, is a memoir tracing his evolving understanding of himself as a musician and a writer. He has also published essays, a few of which were interpolated into Bang Bang Crash.
