= Athenaeum (band) =

US pop-rock band

- Athenaeum, 1998

Background information
- Origin: Greensboro, North Carolina
- Genres: Pop rock
- Years active: 1990–2004
- Label: Atlantic Records
- Past members: Grey Brewster; Nic Brown; Mike Garrigan; Mark Kano; Alex McKinney; Mike Mitschele; Cullen Strawn; Jeremy Vogt

Athenaeum was an alternative pop rock four-piece band from Greensboro, North Carolina, US, formed in 1990 at an eighth grade dance by Nic Brown and Mark Kano.

== Overview ==
Classmates Mark Kano and Nic Brown formed the band, Athenaeum, in highschool. After several personnel changes, vocalist/guitarist Kano and drummer Brown with bassist Alex McKinney and lead guitarist Grey Brewster the band home-recorded demos in 1994, The Unofficial Demo, and later a self-titled eight-song EP in 1995, widely known as Green Album. Selling approximately 10,000 copies, Green Album was self-released and self-distributed, soon distributed by Redeye Distribution.

In 1996 the band was signed by Atlantic Records, releasing their major label debut, Radiance, in 1998. The first single, "What I Didn't Know", was a minor hit in the United States. The song "Flat Tire" from Radiance was a hit and enjoyed wide radio airplay in the Philippines, particularly the radio station NU 107. Though it didn't appear on the film's soundtrack, the song "Un-noticed" was briefly featured in the MTV Films feature Varsity Blues (1999). During the recording phase for their next album, Brown left the band to attend Columbia University. He was replaced by Jeremy Vogt, who performed with the likes of Tonic and The Connells. Brewster also dissolved his membership with the group and was replaced by Mike Garrigan, the lead singer and songwriter of Collapsis.

This new line-up played their first show March 31, 2001, at Ziggy's in Winston-Salem, North Carolina. The new set included Garrigan's Collapsis anthem, "October". Athenaeum's second major label album, Athenaeum, (originally titled Plurabelle until weeks before its official release), was released September 18, 2001; however, it received little promotion in the wake of the September 11, 2001, attacks.

Eventually dropped by Atlantic Records, the band toured independently for an additional three years and released their final record, Hourglass, a collection of rare outtakes & demos, before performing their last show December 28, 2004, at Ziggy's in Winston-Salem, North Carolina.

Kano and Garrigan subsequently formed the band mg4 with McKinney and Vogt, releasing an EP Gravity Affects Me in mid-2004. Garrigan has since stepped back into his solo career and production work.

Brown went on to record and perform with bands/artists such as Ben Lee, Longwave, Skeleton Key, Eszter Balint, and Claire Holley. He has also published three novels, 'In Every Way' (2015), 'Floodmarkers' (2009), and 'Doubles' (2010), and is now an English professor at Clemson University.

Brewster went on to form a local Greensboro, cover band, playing for several years before he finally settled in Charlotte, North Carolina, to begin work as a singer-songwriter and session musician.

In February 2009, Kano released a solo album, Walking on Broadway, produced and engineered by Garrigan. Gavin MacKillop, who also produced Athenaeum's releases on Atlantic Records, did the mixing for the album.

== Discography ==
Studio albums

- Radiance (1998) Billboard Heatseekers peak No. 46
- Athenaeum (September 18, 2001) (often referred to as "The Blue Album")

Extended plays

- Athenaeum (EP) (1995) (widely known as The Green Album and The Green CD)

Compilation albums

- Hourglass (July 30, 2002) (a collection of outtakes and rarities)

Singles

- "What I Didn't Know" (1998) from Radiance. Billboard Hot 100 peak No. 58
- "Flat Tire" from Radiance.
- "Unnoticed" from Radiance.
- "Comfort" from Athenaeum.

Guest contributions

- "Comfort" – Live in the X Lounge IV (2001)
- "Forever and Ever, Amen" (Randy Travis cover) – Songs for Sixty Five Roses (2006)

== Personnel ==
- Nic Brown – drums 1990–2001
- Mark Kano – vocals, guitar, songwriting 1990–2010
- Grey Brewster – lead guitar 1996–2001
- Mike Garrigan – lead guitar 2001–2004
- Alex McKinney – bass 1990–2002
- Jeremy Vogt – drums 2001–2004
- Mike Mitschele – bass 2001–2004
- Cullen Strawn – lead guitar 1994–1996
