= Gangstagrass =

American bluegrass and hip hop band

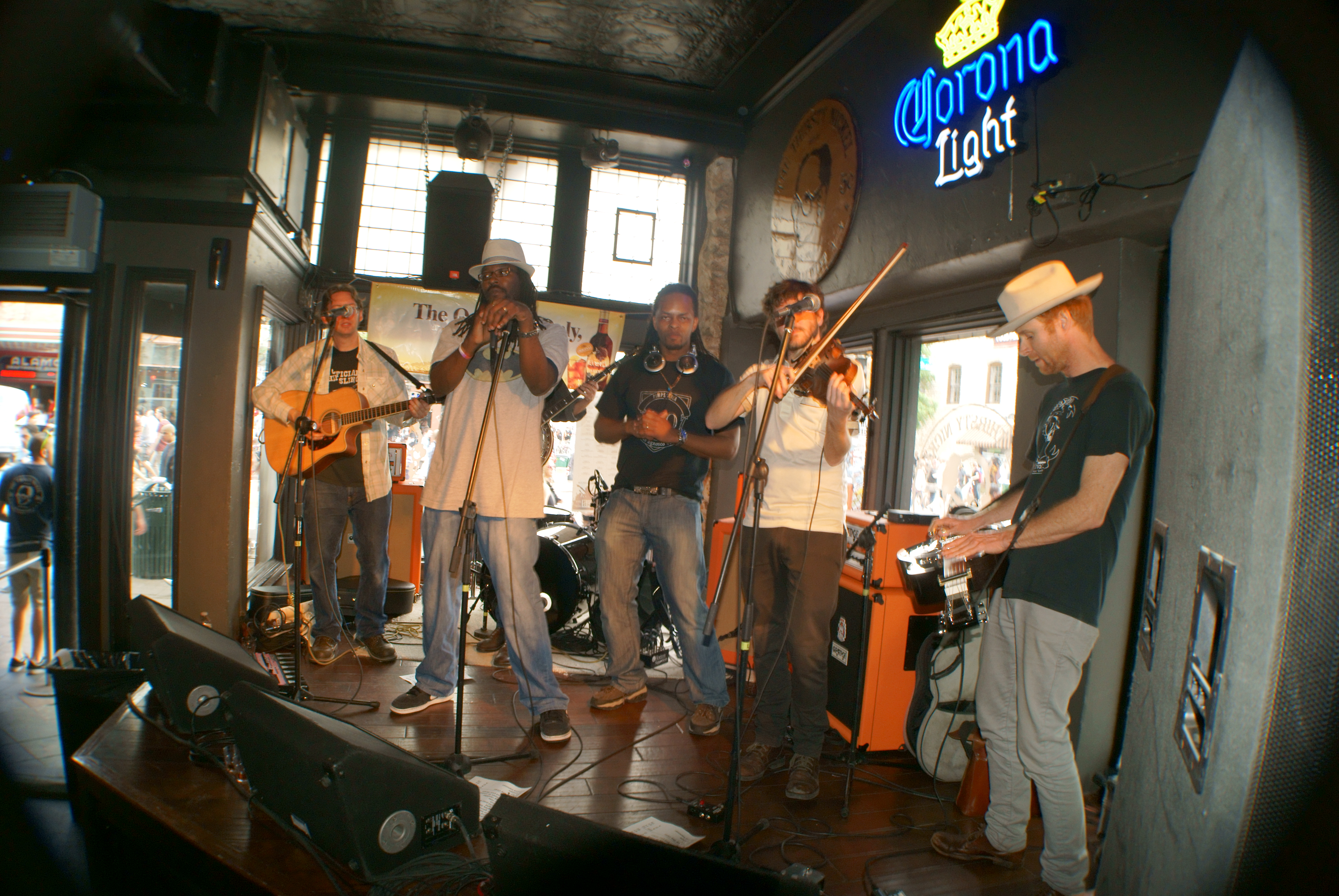
- Gangstagrass on stage in March 2012

Background information
- Origin: Brooklyn, New York, United States
- Genres: Bluegrass; hip hop
- Label: Rench Audio
- Members: Rench: vocals/guitar/beats; Dan Whitener: banjo/vocals; Brian Farrow: fiddle/vocals; R-Son The Voice of Reason: vocals; Dolio The Sleuth: vocals

Gangstagrass is an American bluegrass and hip hop group, most known for the theme song of the FX television show Justified. The group is founded and led by Brooklyn producer Rench (Oscar Owens), and combines authentic bluegrass and rap into a new genre.

== History ==
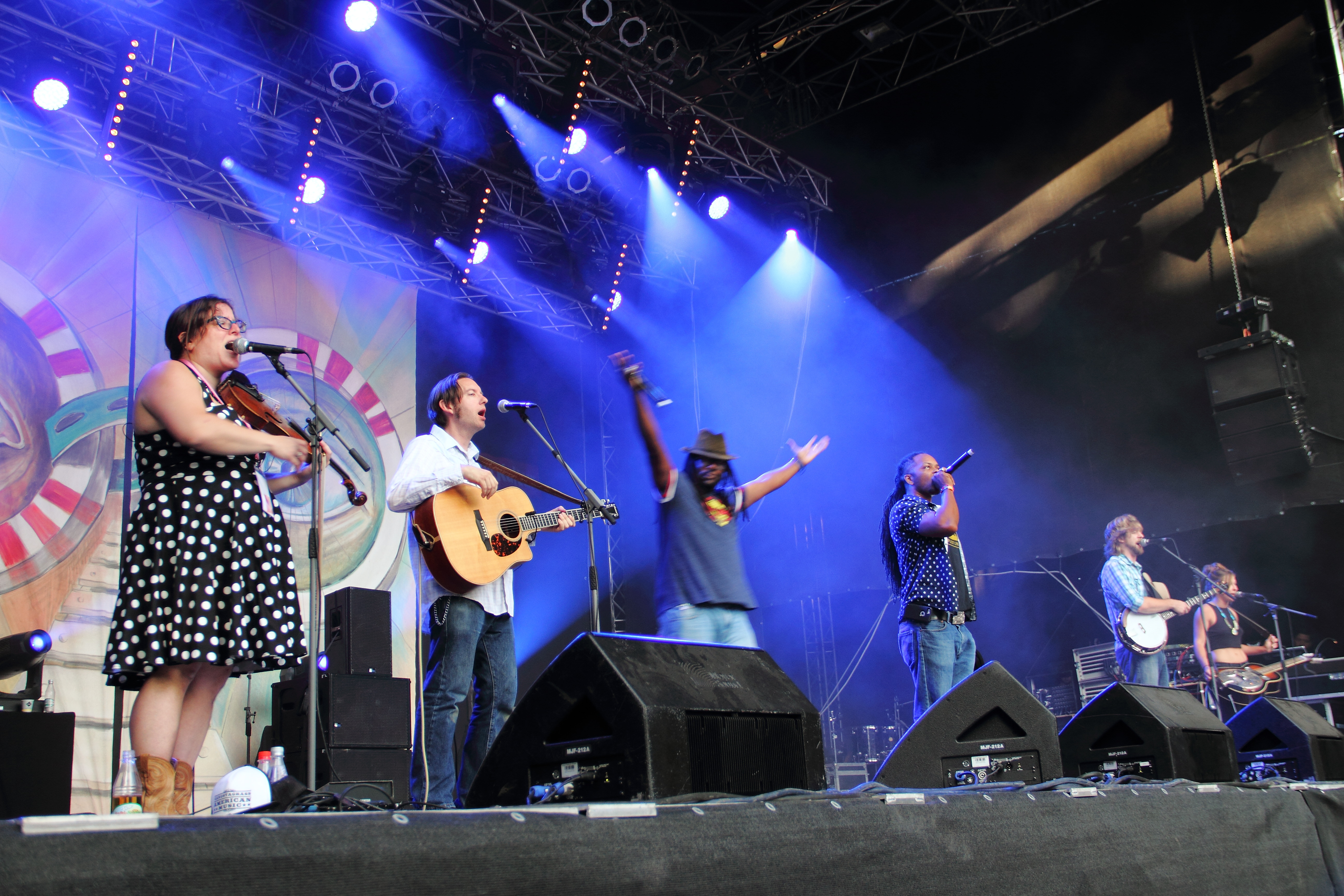
Rudolstadt-Festival 2016

Initially formed in 2006, Gangstagrass started to see its music reaching a wide audience when the band's song "Long Hard Times to Come", was selected to be the opening theme song of the acclaimed television show Justified on FX in early 2010. On July 8, 2010, Gangstagrass producer Rench and rapper T.O.N.E.Z were nominated for an Emmy in the category of Outstanding Original Main Title Theme Music for "Long Hard Times to Come."

The Justified series is based on the work of writer Elmore Leonard, who was a fan of Gangstagrass' music:

Rench and his friends have done nothing short of creating a new form of music. Gangstagrass takes two types of music that are opposites and mixes them together brilliantly in a way that is natural and enjoyable.

— Elmore Leonard,

Gangstagrass released the full-length album Lightning On The Strings, Thunder On The Mic featuring T.O.N.E-z in 2010, and another full-length album Rappalachia featuring various rappers in 2012. Broken Hearts and Stolen Money, the band's third full-length studio album, was released in 2014 and included a hidden track of Will the Circle Be Unbroken. Gangstagrass followed up the next year with American Music, which spent several weeks in the top 10 bluegrass albums on Billboard, marking the first time real hip-hop MCs reached the top 10 on the bluegrass chart. Gangstagrass released a live album in early 2019, Pocket Full of Fire, featuring songs recorded at various venues around the United States in 2018. This album also spent several weeks on the Billboard's top 10 bluegrass albums chart.

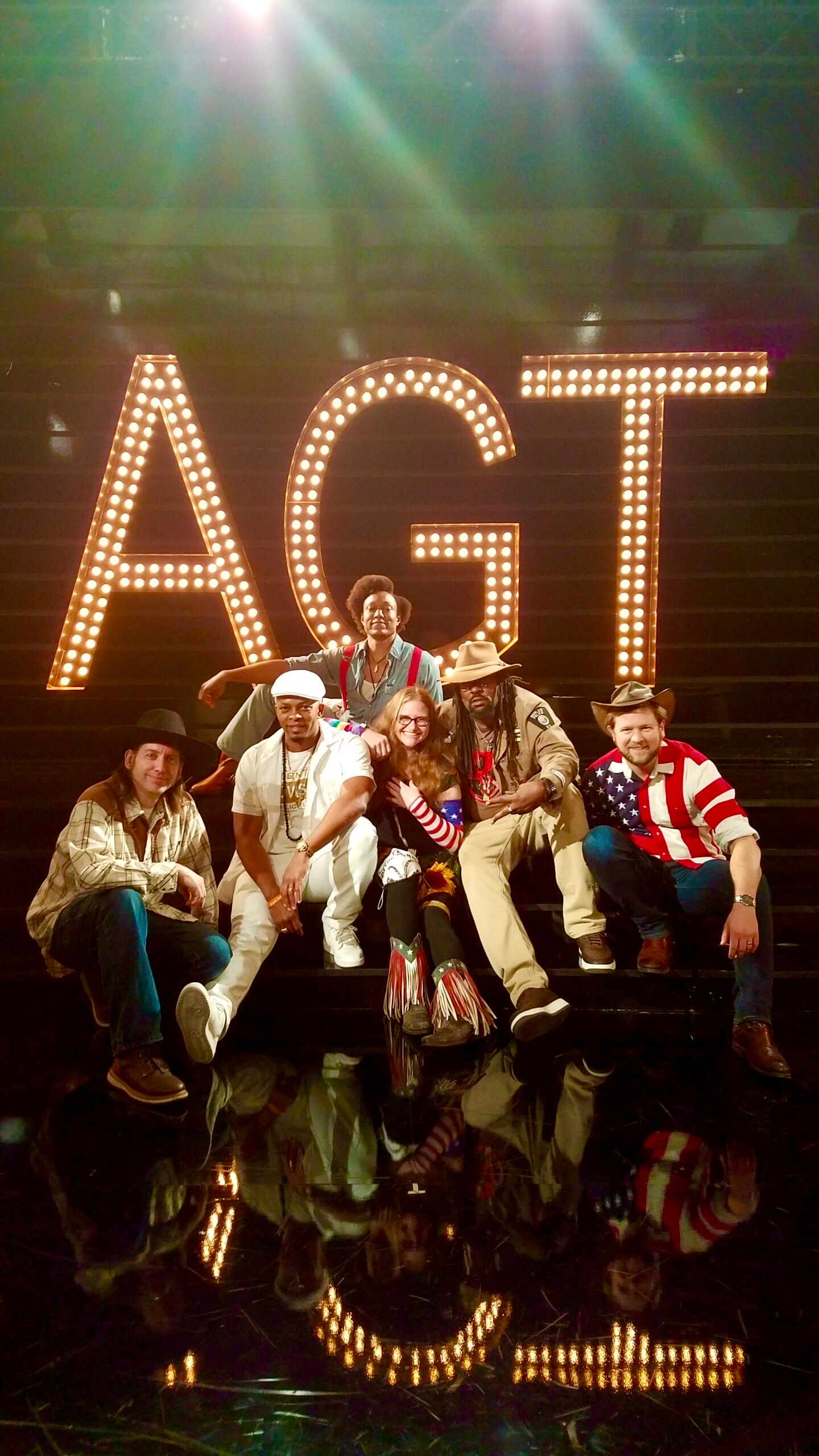
Gangstagrass on the set of America's Got Talent auditions in Pasadena, California, April 2021.

On September 12, 2019, Gangstagrass performed at The Station Inn, the first time ever that hip-hop MCs performed at the legendary Nashville bluegrass venue. In a preview of that performance, Rolling Stone called Gangstagrass "a fresh, much-needed take on traditional roots music."

The band's fifth studio album, No Time For Enemies, was released August 14, 2020, five months into the COVID-19 pandemic. Only three of the songs on the album had been recorded in studio when the COVID-19 lockdowns forced everyone to stay home. The remaining eight songs on the album were recorded by each member of the band individually, sending their parts to Rench, who produced the album from these component parts. The album quickly rose to #1 on the Billboard bluegrass chart, marking the first time in history that an album featuring hip-hop MCs held the top spot on the Billboard bluegrass chart. In its review of the album, Americana Highways magazine declared that Gangstagrass "establishes themselves as America’s Band with No Time For Enemies".

The lineup of Gangstagrass since 2018 has been Rench (vocals, guitar, beats), Dolio the Sleuth (MC, vocals), R-SON the Voice of Reason (MC), Dan "Danjo" Whitener (vocals, banjo), and B.E. Farrow (vocals, fiddle). The MCs and bluegrass players involved in performances have changed from the first album, coordinated by Rench in his role as producer and main contributor.

In 2021, the band auditioned for a place on the 16th season of America's Got Talent and received four yeses from the judges—Simon Cowell, Sofia Vergara, Heidi Klum, and Howie Mandel—and an enthusiastic response from host Terry Crews on the way to becoming quarter-finalists.

Gangstagrass's No Time For Enemies release tour was delayed due to the COVID-19 pandemic, with their full tour of live shows resuming in spring 2022.

== Discography ==
=== Studio albums ===
- Rench Presents: Gangstagrass (2007)
- Lightning on the Strings, Thunder on the Mic (May 2010)
- Rappalachia (May 2012)
- Broken Hearts and Stolen Money (2014)
- American Music (2015)
- No Time For Enemies (2020)
- Sugarplums and Whiskey: A Gangstagrass Holiday Album (2022)
- The Blackest Thing On The Menu (2024)

=== Live albums ===
- Pocket Full of Fire: Gangstagrass Live (February 15, 2019)

=== Singles ===
- "Long Hard Times To Come" (2010)
- "Give It Up (Feat. T.O.N.E-z)" (2011)
- "Gunslinging Rambler (Feat. R-SON the Voice of Reason)" (2012)
- "Shoot Dem (Feat. T.O.N.E-z)" (2012)
- "Western (Feat. Kool Keith)" (2012)
- "Bound to Ride (Feat. R-SON the Voice of Reason and Dolio the Sleuth)" (2012)
- "Keep Talking (Feat. Dolio the Sleuth)" (2014)
- "All For One (Feat. Dolio the Sleuth and R-SON the Voice of Reason)" (2014)
- "Barnburning (Feat. Melody Allegra Berger, R-SON the Voice of Reason, and Dolio the Sleuth)" (2015)
- "Nickel and Dime Blues" (2020)
- "Freedom" (2020)
- "Ain't No Crime" (2020)
- "What I Am" (2020)
- "Bound to Ride - 2021 Version" (2021)
- "Freedom (Juneteenth Remix) (Feat. Rissi Palmer)"
- "Please Don't Take My Home" (2021)
