= Cabin Flounder =

Studio album by Fetchin Bones
- Released: 1985
- Recorded: 1985 at Drive in Studio, Winston-Salem, NC
- Genre: Alternative rock
- Length: 35:30 (vinyl edition); 45:15 (CD edition)
- Label: DB
- Producer: Don Dixon

Fetchin Bones chronology
Cabin Flounder (1985)	Bad Pumpkin (1986)

Professional ratings
Review scores
Source	Rating
Allmusic	3/5 stars

Cabin Flounder is the debut studio album by alternative rock band Fetchin Bones. It was released in 1985 through DB Records. It was reissued on vinyl by the band for Record Store Day in 2024.

== Track listing ==
All songs written by Fetchin Bones

Side one
No.	Title	Length
1.	"A Fable"	3:10
2.	"God's Hanky"	4:17
3.	"So Brilliant"	3:00
4.	"Spinning"	3:00
5.	"Kitchen of Life"	3:19
6.	"Black Lilies"	1:51

Side two
No.	Title	Length
1.	"Briefcase"	3:29
2.	"Plus Seven"	3:03
3.	"What I Did"	2:52
4.	"Asteroids"	2:31
5.	"Too Much"	5:00
Total length:		35:32

CD Version
No.	Title	Writer(s)	Length
1.	"A Fable"		3:10
2.	"God's Hanky"		4:17
3.	"So Brilliant"		3:00
4.	"Spinning"		3:00
5.	"Kitchen of Life"		3:19
6.	"Black Lilies"		1:51
7.	"Briefcase"		3:29
8.	"Plus Seven"		3:03
9.	"What I Did"		2:52
10.	"Asteroids"		2:31
11.	"Too Much"		5:00
12.	"Bells in Her Brain"		3:00
13.	"Lazy Circles"		3:22
14.	"Whole Lotta Love"	Led Zeppelin	3:22
Total length:			45:16

== Personnel ==
Fetchin Bones

- Marc Mueller – drums, bongo
- Hope Nicholls – vocals, harmonica
- Danna Pentes – bass guitar, violin
- Aaron Pitkin – guitar
- Gina Stewart – bass guitar, guitar, vocals
- Gary White – guitar, vocals, photography

Additional musicians and production

- Danny Beard – executive production
- Don Dixon – production, engineering, bass guitar
- Fetchin Bones – design
- James Flournoy Holmes – design
- LuAnn McEachern – photography
- Liz Winkler – photography
