= Zsa Zsa (EP) =

EP by Sugarsmack
- Released: 1992
- Genre: Alternative rock
- Length: 22:05
- Label: Three AM
- Producer: Sugarsmack

Sugarsmack chronology
| Zsa Zsa (1992) | Top Loader (1993) |

Zsa Zsa is an EP by Sugarsmack, released in 1992 through Three AM Records.

== Track listing ==
| No. | Title | Writer(s) | Length |
|---|---|---|---|
| 1. | "Zsa Zsa" | Hope Nicholls, Aaron Pitkin | 4:26 |
| 2. | "Zsa Zsa" (Extend-O-Play mix) | Hope Nicholls, Aaron Pitkin | 6:33 |
| 3. | "Zsa Zsa" (radio edit) | Hope Nicholls, Aaron Pitkin | 3:30 |
| 4. | "Bring on the UFOs" | Chris Chandek, Hope Nicholls | 3:41 |
| 5. | "He's a Party" | Hope Nicholls, Aaron Pitkin | 3:54 |

== Personnel ==
Sugarsmack

- John Adamian – drums
- Chris Chandek – guitar, programming
- Deanna Gonzales – percussion
- Hope Nicholls – vocals, saxophone, design
- Aaron Pitkin – bass guitar, guitar, keyboards, programming

Production and additional personnel

- Mel Gray – bass guitar on "He's a Party"
- Raymond Grubb – photography
- Scott Hull – mastering
- Conrad Hunter – engineering
- Tom Poston – design
- Sugarsmack – production
