= There's a Fire (EP) =

EP by Longwave
- Released: 2005
- Recorded: 2004
- Genre: Indie rock, shoegaze
- Length: 24:03
- Label: BMG Direct
- Producer: John Leckie

Longwave chronology
The Strangest Things (2004)	There's a Fire (2005)	There's a Fire (album) (2005)

There's a Fire is an EP by American indie rock band Longwave. It was recorded in 2004, and featured six songs from their studio-length album of the same name. The seventh recording, "All Your Kings", was unique to this EP. The EP also included three music videos for songs from previous albums, which run for a total of 18 minutes and 41 seconds.

BMG Music Service released There's a Fire exclusively to their club members (for free) by mail in 2005. According to the liner notes, "There's a Fire is certain to be Longwave's breakthrough album, and we're happy to introduce it to you." It was given a rating of five by PopMatters.

== Track listing ==
1. "There's a Fire"
2. "Tell Me I'm Wrong"
3. "River (Depot Song)"
4. "Heart Attack"
5. "Fall on Every Whim"
6. "Next Plateau"
7. "All Your Kings"

== Video listing ==
1. Tidal Wave
2. Everywhere You Turn
3. Wake Me When It's Over
