= Tammy Faye Starlite =

American performance artist and comedian

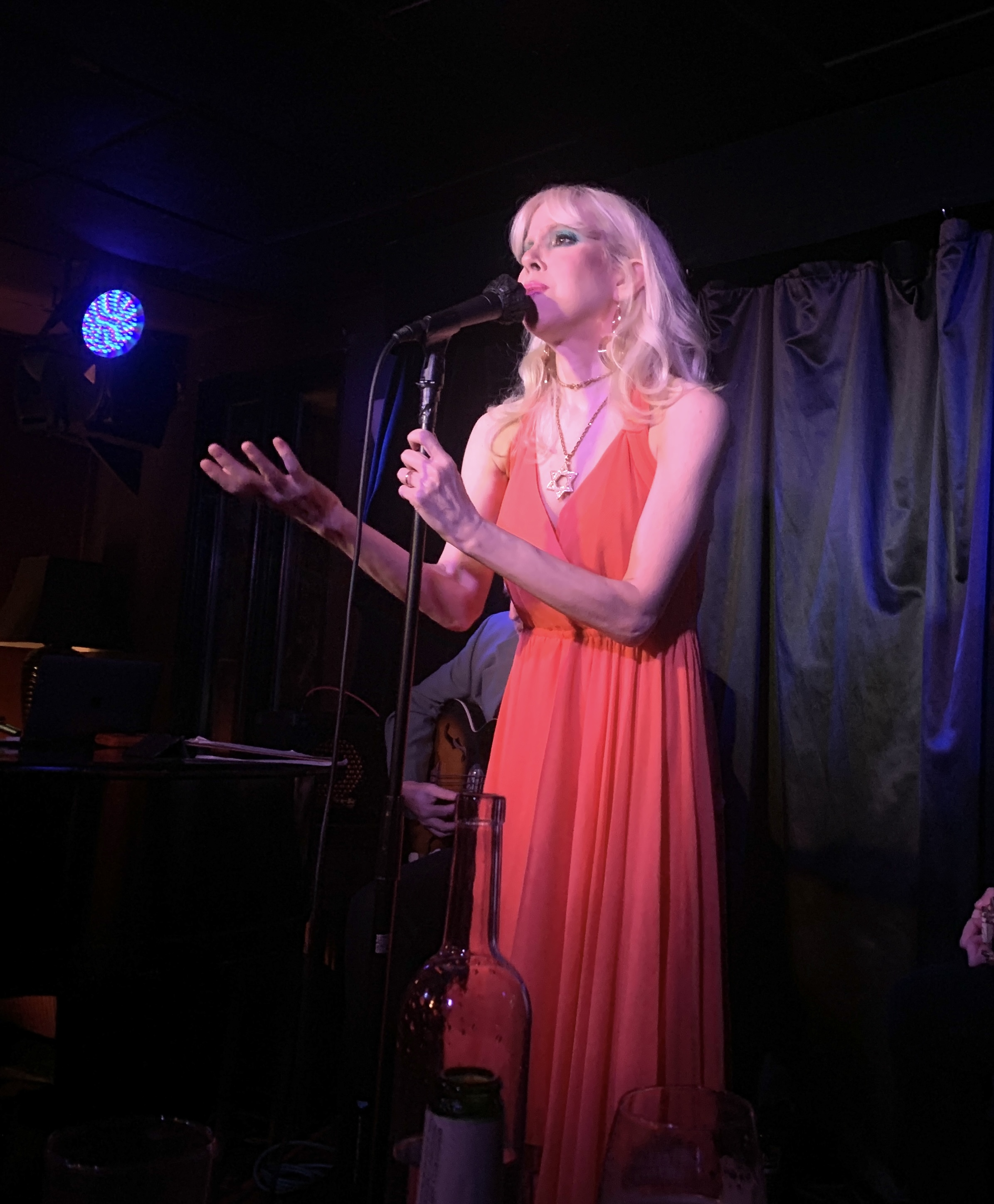
Tammy Faye Starlite (Tammy Lang) performs as Tamar

Tammy Faye Starlite is the stage name of Tammy Lang, an American performance artist, cabaret performer, and actress known for her stage shows that feature original characters and interpretations of famous musicians.

== Career ==
In the 1990s, Lang was an actress and sketch comedian in New York City, playing one of two "wacky maids" on the long-running soap opera Guiding Light, opposite Allison Janney. She also did voice performance, appearing on the animated MTV series Downtown and as a character in Last Call, a comedic bartending simulation. In 2001 she appeared as a "gun toting moll" in the Louis C.K. movie Pootie Tang.

Her alter egos and characters were developed in "alternative comedy venues" including Lakeside Lounge and Luna Lounge in New York City.

== Characters ==
=== Originals ===
==== Tammy Faye Starlite ====
Lang's first original comedic cabaret character, Tammy Faye Starlite, is a fictional right-wing country singer. The character debuted in 1996. Her first original song was "God Has Lodged a Tenant in My Uterus", and she honed the act in New York City and in Nashville at venues including the Bluebird Cafe.

The Starlite character became known for her original songs and outrageous transgressive statements; The New York Times said the act made Lang a "downtown club star".

Tammy Faye Starlite performed with her band, the Angels of Mercy, which included various performers including Daily Show writer Eric Drysdale, and musicians including Elvis Costello and the Attractions drummer Pete Thomas, Billy Ficca from Television, and Smithereens drummer Dennis Diken.

==== Tamar ====
Tamar is a fictional Israeli pop star and the first alter ego that draws from Lang's Jewish heritage in her show titled “Yesterday, Today, and Tamar”, co-written with Rachel Lictman.

=== Tributes ===
==== Nico ====
Since 2010 Lang has been performing as Nico, the late singer, actress and member of the Velvet Underground.

Rolling Stone said, “The show mocks and honors its subject with loving regard.” The New York Times called the show "howlingly funny" and a "funny, morbidly fascinating night of theater."

Lang has said her show Nico: Underground stemmed from an appreciation of the Velvet Underground that led Lang to discover Nico's "haunting and stunning" vocals. Joe's Pub gave Lang a weekly residency to perform as Nico in May 2024.

==== Marianne Faithfull ====
Lang gave tribute to Marianne Faithfull, late musician and actress well known for her association with The Rolling Stones. Along with her one-woman shows that salute Faithfull, in December 2023, Lang was one of 25 artists on a Marianne Faithfull tribute album which was produced to help raise money for Faithfull's medical expenses relating to long COVID.

==== Blondie; Rolling Stones/Mick Jagger ====
Lang has been a member of the all-girl New York band The Pretty Babies, a tribute to Blondie. They performed the entire Parallel Lines album in March 2025 at Joe's Pub.

She got into The Rolling Stones while in high school in the 1980s, and has described the band as "my gateway drug." She began performing her Mick Jagger persona in New York City in a Stones cover band called The Mike Hunt Band. Lang has more recently performed several cabaret series of Stones tributes, with each show devoted to songs from a particular album, and a band that has included violinist/actor Eszter Balint. Lang has also been known to perform albums in their entirety, and in December 2024 she performed the entire Beggars Banquet album to benefit NJArts.net. Lang describes her version of Jagger as "just a really bad accent and being really bitchy, and jumping around."

== Personal life ==
Lang is originally from New York City and now resides in Hoboken, New Jersey with her guitarist husband, Keith Hartel.
