= Endsongs =

Studio album by Longwave
- Released: June 6, 2000
- Recorded: 2000
- Genre: Indie rock
- Length: 34:48
- Label: LunaSea Records

Longwave chronology
Endsongs (2000)	The Strangest Things (2003)

Professional ratings
Review scores
Source	Rating
AllMusic	3/5 stars
The Encyclopedia of Popular Music	3/5 stars
The Province	2.5/4 stars

Endsongs is the debut studio album by American indie rock band Longwave. It was released June 6, 2000, on the LunaSea Records label created by Luna Lounge co-owner Rob Sacher.

== Critical reception ==
The Province called the album "Brit pop as played by New York yankees," writing that "owing to solid musicianship and some memorable tunes, particularly 'Best Kept Secret', this record stands repeated listenings."

== Track listing ==
1. "Escape" – 3:25
2. "Best Kept Secret" – 3:59
3. "Pretty Face" – 2:48
4. "Something" – 3:37
5. "Crushed Down and Faded" – 3:44
6. "Make Me a Believer" – 4:56
7. "Brighter Than Time" – 4:09
8. "Crash" – 3:55
9. "Ending" – 4:15
10. "Make Me Whole" - 4:51
