= Monster (Fetchin Bones album) =

- Original album artwork by Mark Ryden

Studio album by Fetchin Bones
- Released: June 9, 1989
- Recorded: 1989
- Genre: Alternative rock
- Length: 33:16
- Label: Capitol
- Producer: Ed Stasium

Fetchin Bones chronology
Galaxy 500 (1987)	Monster (1989)	Dead Band Rockin (2007)

Monster is the fourth and final studio album by the American Alternative rock band Fetchin Bones, released on June 9, 1989 through Capitol Records.

== Reception ==
Professional ratings
Review scores
Source	Rating
Allmusic	3/5 stars

Monster proved to be the band's most successful release, peaking at #175 on the Billboard charts and producing the popular single "Love Crushing". Tommy Steele was nominated the Grammy Award for Best Recording Package for his artwork on the album. Tom Demalon of allmusic gave it 3 out of 5 stars, praising the emotion depth of the lyrics and noting that "the quintet doesn't let up often, serving up a punk-tinged, power pop musical backdrop for the strafing vocals of Hope Nicholls."

== Track listing ==
All songs composed by Fetchin Bones

No.	Title	Length
1.	"Love Crushing"	3:13
2.	"Say the Word"	3:25
3.	"(I Feel Like An) Astronaut"	4:06
4.	"Deep Blue"	3:12
5.	"I Dig You"	3:02
6.	"Mr. Bad"	3:25
7.	"You're So Much"	3:41
8.	"Bonework"	2:22
9.	"Spot"	3:09
10.	"Cross"	3:41
Total length:		33:16

== Chart positions ==
Album

Chart	Peak
U.S. Billboard 200	175

Singles

Single	Chart (1989)	Position
"Love Crushing"	US Modern Rock Tracks	19

== Personnel ==
Fetchin Bones

- Hope Nicholls – vocals
- Danna Pentes – bass guitar, violin
- Aaron Pitkin – guitar
- Clay Richardson – drums
- Errol Stewart – guitar

Additional musicians and production

- Jay David Buchsbaum – photography
- Tim Carr – executive production
- Jim Dineen – executive engineering
- Paul Hamingson – engineering
- Gina Immel – executive engineering
- Ed Stasium – production
- Tom Whalley – executive production
