= Last Call (video game) =

2000 video game

Last Call!
- Developer: Cutler Creative
- Publishers: Simon & Schuster Interactive
- Platforms: Microsoft Windows, Mac OS
- Release: NA: March 27, 2000; EU: 2000
- Mode: Single-player

Last Call! is a video game for Windows released in 2000 by publisher Simon & Schuster. Those playing the game take on the role of a bartender attempting to maximize tips from customers.

== Development ==
The game was developed by Cutler Creative and supported Windows 95 and Windows 98. The game's creator, John Cutler, first got the idea for the game in 1995. He wanted to have a game that could teach people to mix drinks. Under the original title Bartender USA, the player would start at a Howard Johnson's and gradually work their way up to a trendy bar in New York City. At the time, Cutler had no video game experience, and didn't own a computer until he started development. He attended E3 and also worked as a bartender to better understand what he needed to do. He hired programmers and artists to put together a mockup of the game. The original concept included some live action animation, which was dropped from the final game. Simon & Schuster had recently published the comedy game Deer Avenger, and agreed to publish the game since it matched up with their business model at the time. This agreement gave Cutler's team funding to develop and complete the game. For the writing staff, Cutler hired comedian and Comedy Central writer Susie Felber, who brought her brother Adam Felber onto the project. Due to Cutler's inexperience, many aspects of the game needed to be rethought during the development process. Cutler credited his choice to use Macromedia Director as making a mammoth task much easier. He struggled with feature creep and his relationship with the testing company.

== Gameplay ==
The setting of the game is a fictional bar in New York City. The player, as bartender, must learn to mix over one hundred drinks. They also have to ID all customers (serving an underage customer will get the player fired), charm customers, keep music playing, and keep customers from being too drunk. The game offers a recipe book for players, but players will score better if they don't use it. Also, without memorizing the recipes, the player will run out of time. The ultimate goal of the game is to get the most tips. There are around 20 characters that the player needs to serve in the game. One of these characters is Vincent the Hedgehog, who is an actual hedgehog.

Actress Tina Fey, comedian Brian Stack, and vocalist Tammy Lang are some of the notable performers who provided voice acting work for this game.

== Reception ==
=== Critical reviews ===
Reception

Aggregate score
Aggregator	Score
GameRankings	67%

Review scores
Publication	Score
AllGame	3.5/5
CNET Gamecenter	4/10
GameRevolution	C
GameSpot	6.7/10
IGN	7/10
PC Accelerator	3/10

The game received average reviews according to the review aggregation website GameRankings. Ben Silverman of GameRevolution described it as a casual game, and not one that a player would expect to play for hours. Silverman described it as a replacement for Solitaire that wouldn't hook players, but also stated that with its low price, it may be worth buying. Lisa Karen Savignano of AllGame praised the creative characters, but noted that some of the graphics were poor. Vincent Lopez of IGN appreciated the large library of drinks, but noted that the animation was often clunky.

=== Sales ===
The game sold poorly and was a flop. Despite this, for the French and UK market under the name Happy Hour, and in Germany under the name On the Rocks. Cutler was surprised at the nearly even ratio of male to female purchasers.
