= Lightning on the Strings, Thunder on the Mic =

Studio album by Gangstagrass
- Released: May 2010
- Recorded: 2010
- Genre: Bluegrass; hip hop; country
- Length: 35:53
- Producer: Rench

Lightning on the Strings, Thunder on the Mic is an album by New York City based bluegrass rap group Gangstagrass, released in 2010. It features rapper T.O.N.E-z on vocals.

== Track listing ==
Standard edition
No.	Title	Length
1.	"That's Right I'm Good"	3:17
2.	"I'm Gonna Put You Down"	3:50
3.	"Trouble Everywhere I Go"	3:25
4.	"Click Ol' Gun"	2:39
5.	"I Go Hard"	4:11
6.	"Nobody Gonna Miss Me"	3:54
7.	"Big Branch (Feat. Tomasia)"	3:43
8.	"In My Aching Heart Shadows Linger"	3:27
9.	"My Enemies Lay Beneath The Prairie"	3:35
10.	"Put Your Hands Up High"	3:56
Total length:		35:53

== Musicians ==
- Rench – vocals, guitar, beats
- T.O.N.E-z – raps
- Matt Check – banjo, vocals
- Todd Livingston – resonator guitar
- Jason Cade – fiddle
- Roy Shimmyo – bass guitar
- PREPMODE – turntables
- Jen Larson – vocals
