= Sugarsmack =

American alternative rock band

- Origin: Charlotte, North Carolina, United States
- Genres: Alternative rock
- Years active: 1992–1998
- Labels: Invisible, Sire
- Past members: John Adamian; Chris Chandek; Deanna Gonzalez; Hope Nicholls; Aaron Pitkin

Sugarsmack were an American alternative rock band based in Charlotte, North Carolina, United States, formed by Hope Nicholls and Aaron Pitkin. The group was put together after Hope had departed from her previous band, Fetchin Bones, and had begun to write new music with Pitkin. They began to collaborate with guitarist Chris Chandek, who was eventually asked to join permanently along with his friend John Adamian and Deanna Gonzalez. They were popular locally, with their eclectic sound earning them comparisons to The Fall. The band debuted with Top Loader in 1993 and released their only major label album in 1998 with Tank Top City.

== Discography ==
Studio albums

- Top Loader (1993, Invisible)
- Tank Top City (1998, Sire)

EPs

- Zsa Zsa (1992, Three AM)
- Spanish Riffs (1995, Yesha)
