= Bad Pumpkin =

Studio album by Fetchin Bones
- Released: 1986
- Length: 37:01
- Label: Capitol
- Producer: Don Dixon

Fetchin Bones chronology
Cabin Flounder (1985)	Bad Pumpkin (1986)	Galaxy 500 (1987)

Bad Pumpkin is the second album by the American band Fetchin Bones, released in 1986 through Capitol Records. The band supported the album by touring with R.E.M. They briefly broke up a short time after its release.

== Production ==
The album was produced by Don Dixon. It was recorded in nine days. Bass player Danna Pentes played violin on some tracks. "Chitty Chitty" was inspired by the theme to Chitty Chitty Bang Bang.

== Critical reception ==
Professional ratings
Review scores
Source	Rating
AllMusic	3/5 stars

The Globe and Mail wrote that "the sound is American hip country punk with a comic twist." The Los Angeles Times determined that the album "retains the raucous garage-band sensibility of last year's debut, Cabin Flounder, while expanding the Bones' eclectic-and eccentric-tendencies." The Vancouver Sun concluded that "Hope Nicholls sounds a lot like Patti Smith, and Fetchin' Bones has the energetic freshness of a new wave band, circa 1978." The Providence Journal noted that "the pop ingenues of one track become artful satirists on others, tossing in backwards tape effects, disco whistles, demented Dylanesque harmonica, diabolically scratchy violin and deep, gloomy backup vocals that sound like medieval chanting."

== Track listing ==
All songs written by Fetchin Bones

Side one
No.	Title	Length
1.	"Leaning on the Horn"	2:59
2.	"Little Red Lines"	3:13
3.	"Bed of Seems"	3:09
4.	"Flounder"	3:47
5.	"½ Past"	4:03

Side two
No.	Title	Length
1.	"High Noon"	3:59
2.	"Greensburg"	2:53
3.	"Wine"	4:40
4.	"Tag Along"	2:40
5.	"Chitty Chitty"	2:51
6.	"All Clocks"	2:47
Total length:		37:01

== Personnel ==
Fetchin Bones

- Gary White – Lead Guitar, Bass, Vocals
- Aaron Pitkin – Guitars, Backing Vocals
- Marc Mueller - Drums, Percussion
- Danna Pentes – Bass, Violin, Backing Vocals
- Hope Nicholls – Vocals, Harmonica, Percussion

Additional musicians and production

- Don Dixon – production
