= Tank Top City =

Studio album by Sugarsmack
- Released: February 10, 1998
- Genre: Alternative rock
- Length: 60:20
- Label: Sire
- Producer: Marc Becker

Sugarsmack chronology
Spanish Riffs (1995)	Tank Top City (1998)

Professional ratings
Review scores
Source	Rating
AllMusic	4.5/5 stars
Pitchfork Media	5.6/10

Tank Top City is the second album by Sugarsmack, released in 1998 through Sire Records.

The album was one of many late 1990s Sire alternative rock releases that failed commercially.

== Critical reception ==
Nashville Scene called the album "kinetic, jagged rock that lies somewhere between England’s The Fall and Atlanta’s late, lamented The Jody Grind," writing that it "finds the band in top form." The Memphis Flyer wrote that the band "has adopted an almost-over-the-top punk swagger that makes it stand out." Stereo Review called Tank Top City a "16-song luge ride through wild terrain," writing that "the secret of getting on the band's wavelength when listening to a song like 'Reagan' is to just say no to logic and submit to the band's altered neural pathways."

== Track listing ==
All tracks are written by Sugarsmack.

No.	Title	Length
1.	"Reagan"	4:04
2.	"Josephine"	3:20
3.	"La Rock"	5:08
4.	"Taft"	3:20
5.	"Jefferson"	5:26
6.	"Carter"	3:11
7.	"Stinky"	4:26
8.	"Venus"	3:50
9.	"Rush"	4:07
10.	"Ford T"	1:44
11.	"Nitz"	4:43
12.	"Nixon"	4:45
13.	"Lincoln"	3:19
14.	"Ford A"	2:22
15.	"[untitled]"	1:44
16.	"Roy"	4:49

== Personnel ==
Sugarsmack

- John Adamian – drums, guitar, keyboards, vocals
- Chris Chandek – guitar
- Hope Nicholls – vocals, saxophone, harmonica
- Aaron Pitkin – bass guitar, guitar, vocals

Production and additional personnel

- Aaron Bachelder – timpani
- Mindy Barker – flute
- Marc Becker – production, engineering, mixing
- Greg Calbi – mastering
- Cookie Jackson – cello
- Sarah Beth Turner – saxophone
