= Mikey Jukebox =

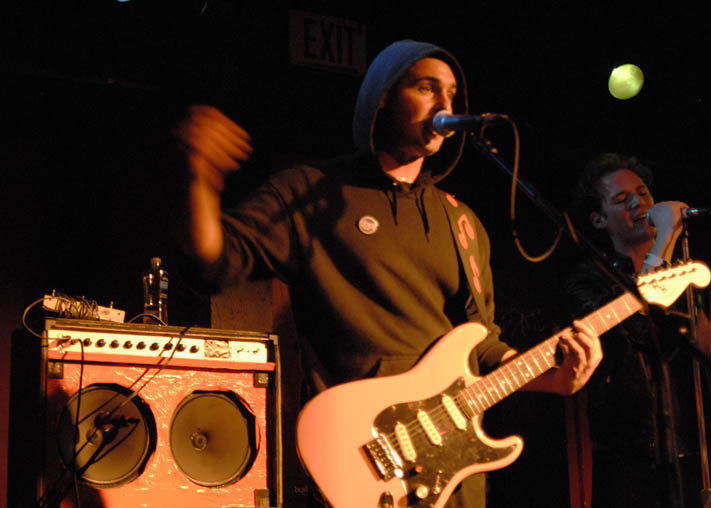
- Mikey James aka Mikey Jukebox, live in 2010.

Background information
- Origin: Rochester, New York, United States
- Genres: Indie pop - Glam Rock
- Years active: 2008-2011
- Labels: Young Lion Of The West Recording Company
- Members: Mike James
- Website: mikeyjukebox.com

Mikey Jukebox is the musical project of Mikey James based in Rochester, New York. Before going solo, James was a member of the New York City based band Longwave. After leaving the group, he returned to Rochester to form The Mercies and eventually Mikey Jukebox.

Much of his songwriting was influenced by a “1950’s Memphis & Rock ‘N’ Roll” phase (Bill Haley, Little Richard, Chuck Berry, Sun Studios-era Elvis Presley, Roy Orbison, Jerry Lee Lewis) combined with a passion for Klaxons, CSS and a love for French House music and early Source Records.

Songs from the record have charted on indie charts and had songs featured on hit TV shows including Gossip Girl (Open Up Your Heart), New Girl (New Radio & You're Gonna Be Mine (Some Day)), Ben & Kate (New Radio), Traffic Light (Insatiable (Gone)), The Lying Game (Insatiable (Gone)) and the film The Secret Lives of Dorks (Hello Dreamer & Ghost of Rock 'N' Roll).

The song that is the biggest example of James’ perfectionism and smorgasbord of influences is Hello Dreamer. There are four recorded versions of this song that James considers “some 1970s teen idol song.” Of the song, James remarked, “I consider myself by all means a glam rock-er at heart (T.Rex, David Bowie, Roxy Music, Sweet, Kiss, New York Dolls, Transformer, Mott the Hoople), and the song really lent itself to it in ways. In the end I was trying for an epic “Station to Station” thing production wise".

James now fronts another solo project, Admirers, due for release on Ardent Music in July 2013, a boutique label based in Memphis at the legendary Ardent Studios.

== Releases ==
- Insatiable EP (2008)
- Just What We're Sayin' (single) (2009)
- Mikey Jukebox (2010)
- Mikey Jukebox (Analog Remaster) (2011)
- We Don't Stop 'Til the Kids "R" Dancin' EP (2011)
