= Spanish Riffs =

EP by Sugarsmack
- Released: 1995
- Genre: Alternative rock
- Length: 32:38
- Label: Yesha
- Producer: Sugarsmack

Sugarsmack chronology
Top Loader (1993)	Spanish Riffs (1995)	Tank Top City (1998)

Spanish Riffs is an EP by Sugarsmack, released in 1995 through Yesha Records.

== Track listing ==
All tracks are written by Sugarsmack.

No.	Title	Length
1.	"Acorn"	5:06
2.	"Creme Horn"	3:42
3.	"Ninja Bikes"	3:26
4.	"Fishnet"	2:34
5.	"Stuff"	4:50
6.	"My Trip to Baden-Baden"	13:00

== Personnel ==
- John Adamian – drums
- Chris Chandek – guitar
- Hope Nicholls – vocals, saxophone
- Aaron Pitkin – bass guitar
