= Galaxy 500 (album) =

Studio album by Fetchin Bones
- Released: 1987
- Recorded: August 1987
- Studios: Reflection, Charlotte, NC
- Length: 37:38 (vinyl edition); 62:57 (CD edition)
- Label: Capitol
- Producer: Don Dixon

Fetchin Bones chronology
Bad Pumpkin (1986)	Galaxy 500 (1987)	Monster (1989)

Galaxy 500 is the third studio album by the American band Fetchin Bones. It was released in 1987 through Capitol Records. The album was produced by Don Dixon. The band supported the album with a North American tour.

== Critical reception ==
Professional ratings
Review scores
Source	Rating
AllMusic	3.5/5 stars

The Washington Post wrote that, "paced by Hope Nicholls' assertive yelping, the quintet's Galaxy 500 claims shards of funk and metal." The Ottawa Citizen called Hope Nicholls's voice "flat, shrill and grating, an outcome made worse by the abundance of hard-edged material." The Orlando Sentinel opined that the album "shows the Bones are as wildly imaginative as R.E.M., the B-52's or any of the New South rock bands that have preceded them to prominence." The Charlotte Observer considered the "funky punk-rap" "Stray" to be the album's best track.

== Track listing ==
All songs written by Fetchin Bones

Side one
No.	Title	Length
1.	"Stray"	3:20
2.	"Everybody Is a House"	1:52
3.	"Sammy"	2:11
4.	"Steamwhistle"	3:34
5.	"You Thirst"	3:46
6.	"Jesse James"	4:13

Side two
No.	Title	Length
1.	"Kingdom"	2:50
2.	"Exit"	2:30
3.	"Sourpuss"	2:36
4.	"Riding Around"	2:29
5.	"Chicken Truck"	2:30
6.	"Things Are Happening"	2:17
7.	"Binoculars"	2:30
Total length:		36:38

CD Version
No.	Title	Length
1.	"Stray"	3:20
2.	"Everybody Is a House"	1:52
3.	"Sammy"	2:11
4.	"Steamwhistle"	3:34
5.	"You Thirst"	3:46
6.	"Jesse James"	4:13
7.	"Kingdom"	2:50
8.	"Exit"	2:30
9.	"Sourpuss"	2:36
10.	"Riding Around"	2:29
11.	"Chicken Truck"	2:30
12.	"Things Are Happening"	2:17
13.	"Binoculars"	2:30
14.	"Super Freak"	5:02
15.	"Stray (Bad Dog Mix)"	4:07
16.	"Wine (Live Version)"	6:15
17.	"Kitchen of Life (Live Version)"	3:00
18.	"Briefcase (Live Version)"	3:25
19.	"Beat the Stray (Bonus Beats)"	2:35
Total length:		61:02

== Personnel ==
Fetchin Bones

- Hope Nicholls – vocals, harmonica
- Danna Pentes – bass guitar
- Aaron Pitkin – guitar
- Clay Richardson – drums
- Errol Stewart – guitar

Additional musicians and production

- Tim Carr – executive production
- Don Dixon – production
- Laurie Douglas – art direction
- Fetchin Bones – design
- Raymond Grubb – photography
- Steve Haigler – engineering
- Mitchell Kearney – photography
- Don "Cannonball" McClure – alto saxophone
- Tom Thoune – illustrations
