= If We Ever Live Forever =

2019 studio album by Longwave

Studio album by Longwave
- Released: October 25, 2019
- Genre: Indie
- Length: 41:34
- Label: Bodan Kuma Recordings

Longwave chronology
Secrets Are Sinister (2008)	If We Ever Live Forever (2019)

Professional ratings
Review scores
Source	Rating
Under the Radar	7.5/10 stars
Stereoboard	2.5/5 stars

If We Ever Live Forever is the fifth studio album by the American indie band Longwave. It is Longwave's first album in over a decade. The album was preceded by the release of "Stay with Me" as a single in October 2018. Two more tracks were released as promotional cuts from the album, "Dreamers Float Away" in July 2019 and "If we Ever Live Forever".

== Track listing ==
No.	Title	Length
1.	"Before You Disappear"	3:50
2.	"If We Ever Live Forever"	4:00
3.	"1 x 1 (Disorder)"	3:29
4.	"Dreamers Float Away"	3:25
5.	"Stay with Me"	4:15
6.	"Echo Bravo"	5:03
7.	"The First"	3:21
8.	"The Trick"	4:31
9.	"The Great Northwest"	4:43
10.	"It's Not Impossible"	4:57
Total length:		41:34

== Personnel ==
- Steve Schiltz – vocals, guitar
- Shannon Ferguson – guitar
- Christian Bongers – bass
- Jason Molina – drums
