= Mike Garrigan =

American singer

Mike Garrigan is an American singer-songwriter from Greensboro, North Carolina, United States.

== Biography ==
Garrigan grew up in Fayetteville, North Carolina, and attended the University of North Carolina-Chapel Hill, where he performed in local coffee houses as a vocalist and guitarist. He is best known as the former frontman of the rock band Collapsis, which, in 2000, reached the No. 28 slot on the Billboard Modern Rock charts with the hit song "Automatic". He was also the second and final lead guitarist for the North Carolina–based band Athenaeum, replacing Grey Brewster for their second album and continuing until the band disbanded in 2004. With former Athenaeum members, Garrigan formed a new band called the "Mike Garrigan Four" (formally known as mg4), which released an EP in 2004. Since then he worked as a solo artist, while continuing to play occasional shows with Mark Kano, lead singer of Athenaeum. In 2006, he released Live at the Evening Muse, a CD/DVD of a solo acoustic show he recorded at a venue in Charlotte, North Carolina, in June 2005. Several of his solo albums have been partially supported through Kickstarter, including the 2011 release The Return of Spring.

On December 15, 2022, Garrigan played a prominent role in the performance celebration of the 40th Anniversary of R.E.M.'s Chronic Town held at Motorco Music Hall in Durham, North Carolina. The primary members of the evening's band – dubbed The Maxell 90 – were Scott Carle (Garrigan's drummer from Collapsis), Tom Mills (Johnny Folsom 4), Alex Lawhon (The Roman Spring) and Andrew Brahnan (Cage Bird Fancier). Based on the success of the Motorco event, promoters announced an encore performance will take place on March 3, 2023, at the Lincoln Theatre in Raleigh, North Carolina.

As of early 2023, Garrigan is finalizing his debut professional music video for the song "Satellites," co-written with fan and Nashville-based songwriter Jonathan Ferreri in 2021. After releasing the songs "Comatose" and "Anchors" from the sessions as stand-alone singles, "Satellites" found its way to Nashville-based filmmaker Samuel Womer who felt the song had commercial potential and approached Garrigan about making a video. Like many of Garrigan's previous efforts, the video project has been funded, in part, via a Kickstarter campaign.

== Discography ==
As leader

- Building a Hole (1994)
- The Lessons of Autumn (1996)
- The Promise of Summer (2002)
- Live at the Evening Muse (2006) (CD/DVD – live)
- The Gossman Passion (2006) (a contemporary Christian rock opera)
- Voyage of the Malamander (2010) (Kickstarter project)
- The Return of Spring (2011)(Kickstarter project)
- Pillar of the Sun (2012) (Kickstarter project)
- The Echoes of Winter (2015)
- Scenes, Vol. 1 (2016) (Digital EP)
- Scenes, Vol. 2 (2017) (Digital EP)
- Scenes, Vol. 3 (2019) (Digital EP)
- Semigloss Albatross (2020)

With Collapsis

- The Chartreuse EP (1998)
- Dirty Wake (Universal Records, 1999)

With Athenaeum

- Athenaeum (Atlantic Records, 2001)

With mg4

- Gravity Affects Me (2004)
