= Top Loader =

Studio album by Sugarsmack
- Released: September 28, 1993
- Genre: Alternative rock
- Length: 43:02
- Label: Invisible
- Producer: Martin Atkins, Mark Walk

Sugarsmack chronology
Zsa Zsa (1992)	Top Loader (1993)	Spanish Riffs (1995)

Professional ratings
Review scores
Source	Rating
AllMusic	3/5 stars

Top Loader is the debut studio album of Sugarsmack, released on September 28, 1993 through Invisible Records.

== Track listing ==
All tracks are written by Sugarsmack, except "B.L.A.S.T." and "Freak" co-written by Martin Atkins and Mark Walk.

No.	Title	Length
1.	"Hey Buddy Boy"	3:21
2.	"Boomerang"	2:33
3.	"B.L.A.S.T."	2:13
4.	"Bring on the Ufo's"	4:03
5.	"Pokey"	3:05
6.	"Seven Seas"	4:54
7.	"Swindle"	3:31
8.	"Pissed Off"	2:29
9.	"Freak"	4:26
10.	"Baby Snake Eyes"	6:56
11.	"My Monster"	3:25

== Personnel ==
Adapted from the Hardcore Vanilla liner notes. Sugarsmack

- John Adamian – drums
- Chris Chandek – guitar, vocals
- Deanna Gonzales – percussion
- Hope Nicholls – vocals, saxophone
- Aaron Pitkin – bass guitar, organ

Production and design

- Kristina Colovic – cover art
- Martin Atkins – production
- Mark Walk – production

== Release history ==
Region	Date	Label	Format	Catalog
United States	1993	Invisible	CD	INV 022
