= My So-Called Band =

Former Punk Band From Charlotte, USA

- Origin: Charlotte, North Carolina, United States
- Genres: Punk rock
- Years active: 1995–2004
- Labels: Yesha, A1S, SW
- Past members: Chris Peigler, Luke Warm, Patrick Korson, Chris Bean, Ryan McGinnis, Chris Loebs, Kevin Gavagan

My So-Called Band was a punk rock band from Charlotte, North Carolina, active in the 1990s and 2000s.

== History ==
The band was started in 1995 by singer-bassist Chris Peigler, guitarist Luke Warm, and drummer Patrick Korson. Prior thereto, Peigler had been a member of several other bands, including Intensive Care and Proletariat Madonna, and has also contributed to the fanzine Razorcake. In 2001, they started their own record label known as "Suicide Watch Records". In 2002, they began recording their third album, Always Something There To Destroy Me, at the Recording Den with Mark Puerello. Their Final Record Weapon of Mass Destruction was recorded and released in 2004, after which, Peigler and, then drummer, Kevin Gavagan formed the band Rogue Nations with long time friend Eric Seitlin.

== Style ==
My So-Called Band's music, which was made deliberately to sound like that of pioneering punk rock musicians, has been described as "like Steve Forbert might've [sounded] if he'd fronted the MC5 while on the lam from all those Next Big Dylan delusionals," and like what would happen if "the Clash and The Ramones had mixed their musical chromosomes." They were also called " the Charlotte, N.C., answer to modern punk-rock" by Sarah Lee.

== Peigler's death ==
Peigler died on January 8, 2014, at the age of 50.

== Discography ==
- My So-Called Band (1997) - Yesha
- The Punk Girl Next Door (2000) - Yesha
- Always Something There to Destroy Me (2003) - A1s
- Weapons of Mass Distortion (2004) - SW Records
