= Motorco Music Hall =

Music venue in Durham, North Carolina

Motorco + Parts & Labor

- Motorco in 2026
- Interactive map of Motorco + Parts & Labor
- Location: 723 Rigsbee Avenue; Durham, North Carolina, U.S.
- Coordinates: 36.0035°N 78.9003°W
- Owner: Chris Tamplin; Jeremy Roth; Mike Webster; Candy Webster
- Capacity: 500
- Type: Music venue Bar

Construction
- Opened: 2010

Website
- motorcomusic.com

Motorco Music Hall + Parts & Labor is a music venue and bar in Durham, North Carolina. It opened in 2010 in the former Weeks Motor Company Building.

== History ==
The venue is housed in the former Weeks Motor Company building that was constructed in 1938. Located in between the Durham Central Park and Foster and West Geer Streets Historic District, the venue opened in September 2010 by Chris Tamlin, Jeremy Roth, Mike Webster, and Candy Webster. Motorco has approximately a 500-person-capacity. Bands and other performers at Motorco have included North Elementary, The Tomahawks, Old Bricks, We Are the Willows, Demon Beat, J Kutchma, Die Nierentische, Tom Maxwell, Xiu Xiu, I Was Totally Destroying It, Trophy Fire, The Hot Toddies, Cochise, The Acacia Strain, Mike Garrigan, Sug Daniels, Chris Gethard, Powfu, Crystal Bright, Adeem the Artist, Rome Streetz, Walker Lukens, and WolvesX4. The first live show of the true crime podcast Criminal was held at Motorco.
