= Hope Nicholls =

American singer (born 1960)

- Born: January 1960; Charlotte, North Carolina, United States
- Genres: Alternative rock
- Occupation: Musician
- Instrument(s): Vocals, Drums, Harmonica, Sax
- Years active: 1983–present
- Labels: Capitol, DB, Invisible, Sire, Coolidge
- Spouse: Aaron Pitkin

Hope Nicholls (born January 1960) is an American singer-songwriter from Charlotte, North Carolina. She was the lead vocalist of the alternative rock bands Fetchin Bones, Sugarsmack and Snagglepuss. She also briefly toured with Martin Atkins' band Pigface in support of its album Fook. Nicholls is now the lead singer and drummer of a project called It's Snakes. Their eponymously titled, debut record came out in December 2016, self-released. This band features husband and life-long musical collaborator Aaron Pitkin on guitar. She is also a contributing vocalist to The Plaza Family Band, a local education fund-raising project.

== Discography ==
=== Fetchin Bones ===
- Cabin Flounder (1985, DB)
- Bad Pumpkin (1986, Capitol)
- Galaxy 500 (1987, Capitol)
- Monster (1989, Capitol)
- Tame Yourself (Various Artists) (1991, RNA/Rhino)

=== Sugarsmack ===
- Zsa Zsa (1992, 3AM)
- Top Loader (1993, Invisible)
- Spanish Riffs (1994, Yesha)
- Tank Top City (1998, Sire)

=== Snagglepuss ===
- The Country Club Sessions (2001)
- Parading About in the Altogether (2003, Coolidge Records)
- The Sound Report (2007, Coolidge Records)
- Doing Music (2012)

=== It's Snakes ===
- It's Snakes (2016)

=== Appears on ===
- Pigface – Truth Will Out (Invisible, 1993)
- Pigface – Notes from Thee Underground (Invisible, 1994)
- Marilyn Manson – Portrait of an American Family (Nothing, 1994)
- Slick Idiot – S U C K S E S S (Itchy, 2009)
