= There's a Fire =

Studio album by Longwave
- Released: June 28, 2005
- Recorded: July 5 – September 23, 2004
- Studios: Allaire, Shokan, New York; Cello Studios, Hollywood, California
- Genres: Indie rock, shoegaze
- Length: 50:46
- Label: RCA Records
- Producer: John Leckie

Longwave chronology
There's a Fire (EP) (2003)	There's a Fire (2005)	Secrets Are Sinister (2008)

Professional ratings
Review scores
Source	Rating
AllMusic	link

There's a Fire is the third studio album by American indie rock band Longwave, released in 2005 on RCA Records. The US version of the CD contained a hidden instrumental track titled "Sea Monster", while the Japanese version contained "Sea Monster" as well as two other bonus tracks.

== Track listing ==
1. "There's a Fire" – 3:22
2. "Underworld" – 5:13
3. "River (Depot Song)" – 5:43
4. "The Flood" – 3:30
5. "Tell Me I'm Wrong" – 3:42
6. "Heart Attack" – 4:53
7. "Dancing in the Light" – 1:34
8. "We're Not Gonna Crack" – 2:29
9. "Down in Here" – 3:51
10. "Fall on Every Whim" – 3:14
11. "Next Plateau" – 3:01
12. "Underneath You Know the Names" – 4:56
13. "Sea Monster" (hidden track) – 2:23

== Japanese bonus tracks ==
1. "Sea Monster"
2. "All Your Kings" – 3:48
3. "Love Remains" – 1:59

== Personnel ==
- Steve Schiltz – guitars, vocals
- Shannon Ferguson – guitars
- Nic Brown – drums
- Carlos Anthony Molina – saxophone on "Sea Monster"
- John Leckie – producer, mixing
- Ted Jensen – mastering
- George Shilling – engineer (Basic Tracks)
- Steven Rhodes – engineer (Overdubs)
- Matthew Cullen – additional engineering
- Nik Karpen – additional engineering
- Pete Min – additional engineering
- Steve Ralbovsky – A&R
- Gary Waldman, Morebarn Music – management
- Burton Goldstein And Co. – management (business)
- Carroll, Guido & Groffman, Rosemary Carroll – legal
- Frank Riley, High Road Touring, Matt Hickey – booking
- Longwave – art direction
- Robin C. Hendrickson – art direction
- Mandolyn Wilson – illustration
