= Fetchin Bones =

American rock band

- Also known as: Fetchin' Bones
- Origin: Charlotte, North Carolina, USA
- Genres: Rock
- Years active: 1983–1990
- Labels: DB Records, Capitol
- Past members: Hope Nicholls (vocals); Aaron Pitkin (guitar); Danna Pentes (bass and occasional violin); Clay Richardson (drums); Errol Stewart (guitar); Marc Mueller (drums); Gary White (guitar and vocals)

Fetchin Bones was a cross-genre rock band from North Carolina. During a six-year career they produced four studio albums but were most celebrated for inspired live performances. One reviewer stated they were "a band that must be seen live for a full grasp of their eclectic frenzy". During numerous tours Fetchin Bones supported acts such as R.E.M., The B-52s, X and the Red Hot Chili Peppers. Allmusic described the band as "a truly underrated group that didn't hit it big when they should've".

== Musical style ==
The band mixed blues, punk and country music, and Hope Nicholls' "powerhouse" vocals were compared to Janis Joplin's in their "dirty intensity". In a 1985 interview with Andy Kershaw on The Old Grey Whistle Test, Nicholls said her influences include British bands Siouxsie and the Banshees and the Cocteau Twins.

Fetchin Bones' first three albums were produced by Don Dixon and recorded at Mitch Easter's Drive-In Studio and at Reflection Studios in Charlotte. The fourth and final album was produced by Ed Stasium in Los Angeles.

The band had pioneered a kind of grunge rock. However this style did not yield commercial success.

== Discography ==
Albums

- Cabin Flounder (1985, DB)
- Bad Pumpkin (1986, Capitol)
- Galaxy 500 (1987, Capitol)
- Monster (1989, Capitol)
- Dead Band Rockin' (2007, Audible Attraction)

Singles

- "Super Freak" (1988, Capitol)
- "Love Crushing" (1989, Capitol) (Modern Rock Tracks #19)
