= Secrets Are Sinister =

2008 studio album by the band Longwave

Studio album by Longwave
- Released: November 11, 2008
- Recorded: June, 2007
- Genre: Indie rock, shoegaze
- Length: 39:22
- Label: Original Signal Recordings
- Producer: Longwave, Dave Fridmann, Peter Katis

Longwave chronology
There's a Fire (2005)	Secrets Are Sinister (2008)	If We Ever Live Forever (2019)

Professional ratings
Review scores
Source	Rating
AllMusic	link
Pitchfork	(4.8/10) link
PopMatters	link
Spin	(5/10) link

Secrets Are Sinister is the fourth studio album by American indie rock band Longwave. It was released on November 11, 2008 on Original Signal Recordings.

== Track listing ==
1. "Sirens in the Deep Sea" – 3:59
2. "No Direction" – 4:15
3. "Satellites" – 3:34
4. "The Devil and the Liar" – 4:44
5. "Life Is Wrong" – 4:40
6. "Eyes Like Headlights" – 3:45
7. "I Don't Dare" – 3:36
8. "It's True" – 3:48
9. "Shining Hours" – 3:44
10. "Secrets Are Sinister" – 3:17
11. "Sideways Sideways Rain" (Japanese bonus track) – 4:12
