= Hobex =

- Origin: Durham, North Carolina, United States
- Genres: Funk, Soul
- Years active: 1996–present
- Label: Phrex Records
- Website: hobex.com

Hobex is an American funk group from North Carolina.

== History ==
Hobex was formed by singer/guitarist Greg Humphreys after the demise of his prior ensemble, Dillon Fence, alongside drummer Steve Hill (originally from Johnny Quest) and bassist Andy Ware. Their first release was 1996's Payback EP, which was a regional hit in the southeastern United States. Their debut full-length, Back in the 90s, came out in 1998 but was re-released on Slash/London Records in 1999 as the band gained press. 2000's Wisteria and 2002's U Ready Man? (featuring members of a side project of Squirrel Nut Zippers called The Jazz Squad Horns) followed. The group took a break from recording before returning with 2007's Enlightened Soul.

== Members ==
Current Members

- Greg Humphreys - vocals, guitar, songwriting
- Andy Ware - Bass
- Dan Davis - Drums
- Doug Largent - Organ
- Robert Cantrell - Percussion
- Tim Smith - Sax

Former members

- Steve (The Doctor) Hill - drums
- Dustin Clifford - Drums
- April Howell - backing vocals

== Discography ==
- Payback EP (Symbiotic Records, 1996)
- Back in the 90's (Phrex Records, 1998; re-released on London Records, 1999)
- Wisteria (Phrex, 2000)
- U Ready Man? (Tone-Cool/Artemis Records, 2002)
- Enlightened Soul (Phrex, 2007)
