= Luna Lounge =

Former bar and music club in Manhattan, New York

Coordinates: 40°43′18.23″N 73°59′15.46″W

Luna Lounge was a bar and music club located at 171 Ludlow Street on Manhattan's Lower East Side. Opened in 1995 by Dianne Galliano and Robert Sacher, it was a popular venue for local bands and stand-up comics (the rock band Interpol played there early on and last returned in 2003 to perform a secret show under the name "Cuddleworthy"). Luna Lounge is notable as the place where Elliott Smith wrote the songs for his first major label release, XO.

The performance room hosted two to four bands six nights a week, with the "Eating It" alternative stand-up comedy show filling the room on Mondays. "Eating It" featured a changing line-up of comedians including Sarah Silverman, Janeane Garofalo, Louis C.K., Jim Norton, Ted Alexandro, Todd Barry, H. Jon Benjamin, Greg Giraldo, Marc Maron, Mitch Hedberg, Patrice O'Neal, Kathy Griffin, Dennis Miller, Patton Oswalt, Sarah Vowell, Mike Birbiglia, Dave Chappelle and Roseanne Barr; performance artists such as Reverend Jen, Michael Portnoy and Tammy Faye Starlite; and dozens of others. The weekly event was initially devised by Garofalo and Maron, who later helped create the radio network Air America Radio. The $8 admission fee included a drink. Footage of the bar can be seen in the 1997 independent comedy movie Who's the Caboose?, which starred Silverman.

A much-loved foosball table was located by the entrance; a game cost $1 in quarters.

Luna Lounge was forced to close when its landlord sold the small building to a buyer who planned to demolish it and build a larger development site. The bar closed its doors for the last time at its original location on the morning of June 12, 2005 and the building was torn down on July 26 and 27 of that year.

Music at Luna Lounge was always free. When the club closed, it was the last spot on the Lower East Side to feature nightly rock shows with no cover. Some other bands which played the venue early in their careers include The Strokes, Interpol, Longwave, Yeah Yeah Yeahs, Ambulance LTD, Nada Surf, Ratatat, The National, Wheatus and Stellastarr.

Sacher, without Galliano, opened a second Luna Lounge on January 22, 2007, in a new Williamsburg, Brooklyn space. Among the artists to play the reopened location were The Meat Puppets, Steve Forbert, The Knitters, The Pipettes, Longwave, Rob Dickinson, The Black Angels, Melvins, Bell Hollow and Kate Nash. Luna Lounge sold its Williamsburg lease in April 2008 to the Knitting Factory.

Luna Lounge co-creator and co-owner Sacher later wrote an autobiography, Wake Me When It's Over, which mainly focused on Luna Lounge and its historic and cultural significance within the music scene in New York. The book was published by Selena Press on March 1, 2012.
