= Greg Humphreys =

American singer-songwriter

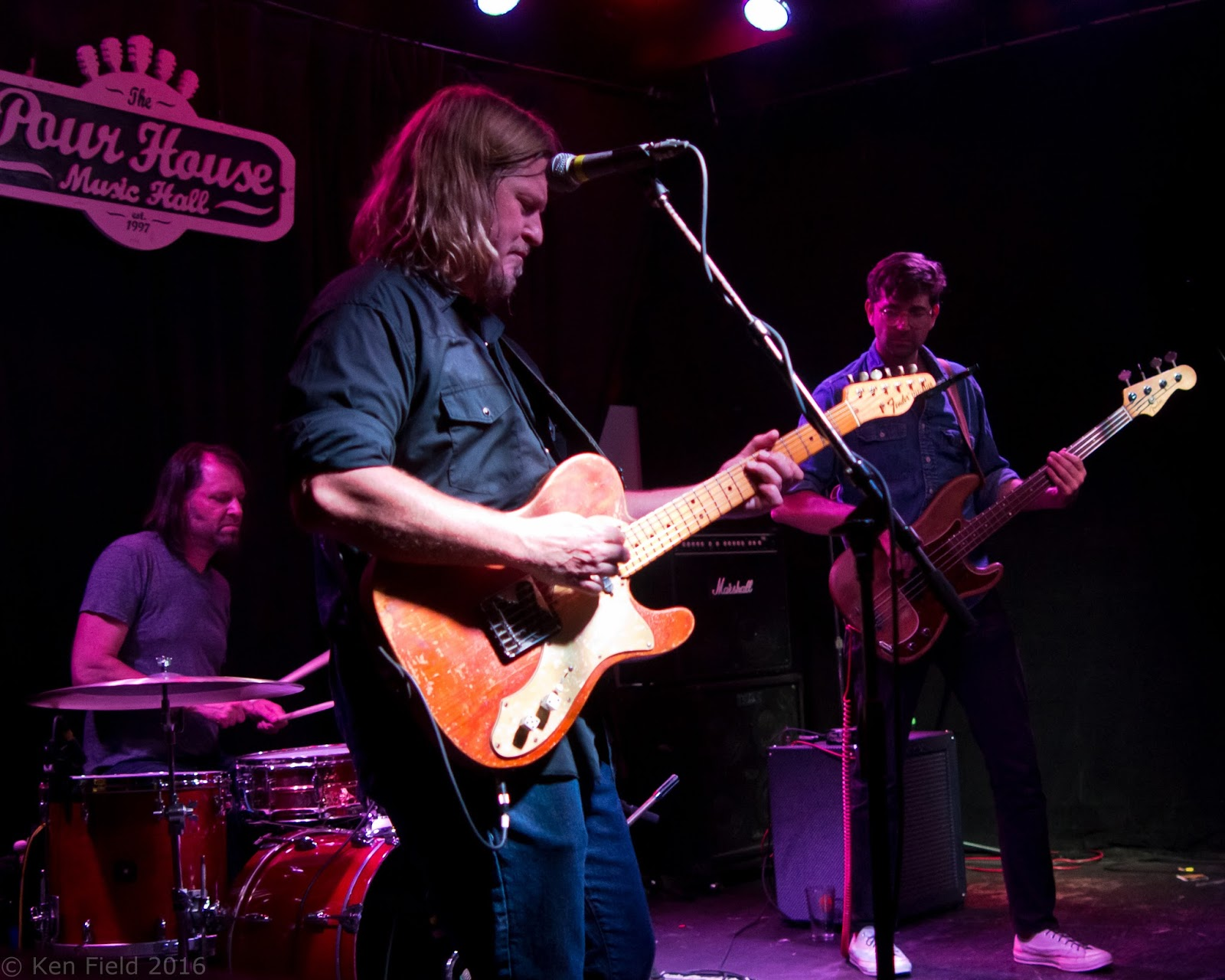
- The Greg Humphreys Electric Trio performing in 2016

Background information
- Born: Winston-Salem, North Carolina, United States
- Genres: Singer-songwriter, R&B, soul, rock, funk
- Instruments: Vocals, guitar
- Label: Phrex Records
- Website: greghumphreys.net

Greg Humphreys is an American singer, guitarist and songwriter based in New York City who performs solo and as bandleader of Dillon Fence, Hobex and The Greg Humphreys Electric Trio.

== Early life ==
Greg Humphreys was born and raised in Winston-Salem, North Carolina. His mother was an art teacher and his attorney father was a folk musician. While a student at Richard J. Reynolds High School, Humphreys and his classmate, Chris Goode, formed a band called "Trash" that eventually evolved into Dillon Fence.

== Career ==
Dillon Fence, for which Humphreys was the principal songwriter, vocalist and guitarist, began while was enrolled at the University of North Carolina in the late 1980s. The band released three full-length albums and several EPs on its own and via Mammoth Records and developed a cult following throughout North Carolina. Shortly after the departure of original band members Chris Goode (bass) and Kent Alphin in 1995, Dillon Fence called it quits, although the members still reunite fairly regularly for North Carolina-area shows.

Together with Dillon Fence's last bassist, Andy Ware, Humphreys began playing as Hobex in 1996, eschewing the indie rock roots of Dillon Fence in favor of the soul and funk music with which Greg had grown up. The band's following in the southeast U.S. led to the band being signed to London Records. The lack of major commercial breakthrough and the strain of constant touring caused Humphreys to disband Hobex in 2007. Hobex performs reunion gigs from time to time.

Humphreys then began touring as a solo artist with just an acoustic guitar, writing and playing laid-back songs incorporating folk, pop, bluegrass and jazz influences. These songs were documented in a series of self-released CDs: Trunk Songs (2008); Realign Your Mind (2010); People You May Know (2011); Bohemia (2013); and Cosmic Irony (2014).

In 2012, Humphreysrelocated from North Carolina to New York City to be with a woman. Upon arriving in New York City, he met back up with a fellow expatriate from the North Carolina music scene, Matt Brandau (bassist for The Old Ceremony), with whom he collaborated on new recordings. Brandau suggested they team up with drummer Keith Robinson (Marcia Ball, Charlie Robison). The group solidified as Greg Humphreys Electric Trio, adding a rock ‘n’ roll element to Humphreys's solo songs and spawning compositions tailored to the band members’ expertise in diverse musical styles such as funk, soul, blues and country. In 2014, the GHET released a live album called "Rock at Live Wood" (recorded at Rockwood Music Hall in New York City), followed up by a full-length studio album of all-new material called "Lucky Guy" in 2016, which was funded by fans via PledgeMusic.

=== Collaborations ===
Humphreys has co-written and recorded songs with William Bell.

== Discography ==
=== Solo albums ===
- Trunk Songs (2008), Phrex Records
- Realign Your Mind (2010), Phrex Records
- People You May Know (2011), Phrex Records
- Bohemia (2013), Phrex Records
- Cosmic Irony EP (2014), Phrex Records

=== as Greg Humphreys Electric Trio ===
- Rock at Live Wood (live album) (2014), Phrex Records
- Lucky Guy (2016), Phrex Records
- Haymaker (2018), Phrex Records

=== with Hobex ===
- Payback EP (1996), Phrex Records
- Back in the ‘90s (1998), Phrex Records
- Back in the ‘90s (1999), Slash/London Records
- Wisteria (2000), Phrex Records
- U Ready Man? (2002), Tonecool/Artemis Records
- Live at the Pour House (DVD) (2007), Phrex Records
- Enlightened Soul (2007), Phrex Records
- Live at Shakori Hills (2009), Phrex Records

=== with Dillon Fence ===
- Dillon Fence EP (1989), NoCar Records
- Christmas EP (1991), Mammoth Records
- Rosemary (1992), Mammoth Records
- Daylight EP (1992), Mammoth Records
- Outside In (1993), Mammoth Records
- Black Eyed Susan 7" (1993), Mammoth Records
- Any Other Way EP (1993), Mammoth Records
- Living Room Scene (1994), Mammoth Records
- Live at the Cat's Cradle (2001), Phrex Records
- Best + (2004), Morisen Records
