= The Strangest Things =

Studio album by Longwave
- Released: March 18, 2003
- Recorded: Tarbox Road Studios, Cassadaga, New York
- Genre: Indie rock, shoegaze
- Length: 42:44
- Label: RCA Records
- Producer: Dave Fridmann

Longwave chronology
Endsongs (2000)	The Strangest Things (2003)	There's a Fire (EP) (2005)

Professional ratings
Review scores
Source	Rating
AllMusic	4/5 stars
Pitchfork	(3.7/10)

The Strangest Things is the second studio album by American indie rock band Longwave, released on March 18, 2003, via RCA Records.

== Track listing ==
1. "Wake Me When It's Over" – 4:06
2. "Everywhere You Turn" – 3:39
3. "Pool Song" – 3:00
4. "I Know It's Coming Someday" – 4:15
5. "Meet Me at the Bottom" – 4:25
6. "Can't Feel a Thing" – 1:30
7. "Tidal Wave" – 3:27
8. "The Ghosts Around You" – 4:14
9. "All Sewn Up" – 3:42
10. "Exit" – 3:52
11. "Strangest Things" – 3:13
12. "Day Sleeper" – 3:26
13. "State of Mine" (Japanese bonus track) – 3:09
