= Longwave (band) =

American indie rock band

- Origin: New York City, New York, U.S.
- Genres: Indie rock, shoegaze
- Years active: 1999–2008; 2018–present
- Labels: LunaSea Records; Fenway Recordings; Hummer; 14th Floor Records; RCA Records; BMG; Original Signal Recordings
- Members: Steve Schiltz; Shannon Ferguson; Jason Molina; Christian Bongers
- Past members: David Marchese; Jeremy Greene; Mike James; Nic Brown; Jeff Sheinkopf; Paul Dillon; Morgan King
- Website: LongwaveTheBand.com

Longwave is an American indie rock band. The band was formed in 1999 by guitarist, songwriter and vocalist Steve Schiltz; guitarist Shannon Ferguson; bassist David Marchese; and drummer Jeremy Greene. The band was active from 1999 to 2008. As of 2018 the band had reformed and was recording new music. Longwave's fifth album If We Ever Live Forever was released October 25, 2019.

== History ==
Before Longwave formed, Schiltz played guitar in a band called Scout, featuring vocalist Ashen Keilyn.

A few months after Schiltz left his hometown of Rochester, New York, he returned to play regular gigs at the Blue Sunday coffee house with a group called the Deaf Aides, named for John Lennon's comments that open the Let It Be album. Later renamed Longwave, their revolving cast of members eventually included bassist Marchese and drummer Greene, followed by Ferguson, who had been working in a studio as a bassist for various bands on the West Coast. The band, based in New York City, found its initial audience by performing a series of shows at the Luna Lounge club on Manhattan's Lower East Side.

Longwave's first release, the self-produced Endsongs, was released in 2000 on LunaSea Records, a record label created by Luna Lounge co-owner Rob Sacher. The album garnered notice in the burgeoning early 2000s New York City rock scene, and soon after the band began touring the U.S.

Greene left the band, and Schiltz's friend (and fellow Rochester native) Mike James (formerly Mike Lapiana) joined as drummer.

With their popularity on the rise, the band gained the interest of major record labels and were eventually signed by RCA Records. The subsequent second album, The Strangest Things (2002), was produced by Dave Fridmann (the Flaming Lips, Mercury Rev). They toured with some of the biggest bands of the period including The Strokes and the Vines. Three videos were produced for this album, including "Everywhere You Turn," which was directed by writer-director Daedalus Howell and featured Longwave performing at the Echo in Los Angeles.

After several successful years of touring the UK and US, and the release of a 2004 EP Life of the Party, Longwave returned to the studio to record their third album, There's a Fire. Produced by John Leckie, it was released in 2005. Marchese and James had both left the band, and Schiltz and Ferguson performed all of the bass guitar on the album. Nic Brown, who had previously filled in for James while touring, played drums on the album, while Jeff Sheinkopf played keyboards and guitar. By the time of the album's release, a new rhythm section had joined: bassist Paul Dillon and drummer Jason Molina. Dillon was later replaced by Morgan King.

Parting ways with RCA, they released their fourth album, Secrets Are Sinister, on November 11, 2008, on the Original Signal Recordings label and mounted a national tour with Blue October. The band then went on an extended hiatus.

Schiltz collaborated with Keilyn again on his project Hurricane Bells, releasing two albums: Tonight Is the Ghost (2010) and Tides and Tales (2011). In 2014, he collaborated with members of the band Blue October on the project Harvard of the South.

After leaving Longwave, James returned to Rochester and formed the Mercies. He later started his own band, Mikey Jukebox, and fronted Admirers.

On January 17, 2018, Longwave announced on the band's official Facebook page that they had resumed activity, saying, "We have been playing again. There is new music, and there will be shows". The current lineup features Schiltz, Ferguson and Molina, with new bassist Christian Bongers replacing King.

On November 14, 2018, Longwave shared the music video for their first single in more than a decade, "Stay With Me", released on the Bodan Kuma label. Dave Doobinin of Follette Films directed the video.

The next year, on July 26, 2019, they released a new single, "Dreamers Float Away", also on the Bodan Kuma label.

As of 2026 Longwave's most streamed song is "Tidal Wave" from their first album "The Strangest Things" Amassing 1,514,554 Streams

== Band members ==
- Steve Schiltz — guitars, vocals
- Shannon Ferguson — guitars
- Jason Molina — drums
- Christian Bongers — bass

=== Previous members ===
- David Marchese — bass
- Jeremy Greene — drums
- Mike James — drums
- Nic Brown — drums
- Jeff Sheinkopf — keyboards/guitars
- Paul Dillon — bass guitar
- Morgan King — bass

== Discography ==
=== Studio albums ===
- Endsongs (2000, LunaSea Records)
- The Strangest Things (2003, RCA Records)
- There's a Fire (2005, RCA Records)
- Secrets Are Sinister (2008, Original Signal Recordings)
- If We Ever Live Forever (2019, Bodan Kuma Recordings)

=== Singles and EPs ===
- "Exit" single (2002, Hummer)
- "Pool Song" single (2002, Hummer)
- Day Sleeper EP (2002, Fenway Recordings)
- "Everywhere You Turn" single (2003, 14th Floor Records)
- "Day Sleeper" single (2003, 14th Floor Records)
- "Wake Me When It's Over" single (2003, 14th Floor Records)
- Tidal Wave EP (2004, BMG Funhouse)
- Life of the Party EP (2004, RCA Records)
- There's a Fire EP (2005, BMG Direct)
- "Stay With Me" (2018, Bodan Kuma)
- Dreamers Float Away (2019, Bodan Kuma)
