= Dillon Fence =

American rock band

- Also known as: The Magoos
- Origin: Chapel Hill, North Carolina, United States
- Genre: Alternative rock
- Years active: 1986–1995 (intermittently since)
- Label: Mammoth
- Members: Greg Humphreys; Kent Alphin; Chris Goode; Scott Carle
- Past members: Brooke Pitts; Trent Pitts; Jim Smith; Andy Ware

Dillon Fence was an American rock band from Chapel Hill, North Carolina. They were initially active from the mid-1980s until 1995. The band released three full-length albums (Rosemary, Outside In and Living Room Scene) on Mammoth Records.

== History ==
The group formed in 1986 at the University of North Carolina, Chapel Hill, originally named the Magoos, with an initial lineup of Greg Humphreys (guitar), Chris Goode (bass guitar), Kent Alphin (guitar), and Brooke Pitts (drums). Humphreys and Goode had previously played together in a high school band. They changed the band name to Dillon Fence prior to their first live performance, derived from a regionally famous landmark fence made by local artists in the town of Dillon, South Carolina.

Pitts was replaced by his brother, Trent Pitts, due to a broken leg, prior to the recording of the band's self-titled first EP., and then by Scott Carle after the first album's release. They were signed by Mammoth Records in 1991, the label issuing the "Christmas" CD-single that year, and the band's debut album, the Ron Saint Germain-produced Rosemary, the following year. Another EP (Daylight) followed, before the release of the band's second album, the Lou Giordano-produced Outside In in 1993. The album raised the band's profile, although Option magazine described it as "like a whole record of oddly matched 70s radio rock".

Living Room Scene followed in 1994, again on Mammoth, with Eastwest Records releasing it in the UK, and Atlantic Records in the rest of Europe, and built on the success of Outside In to become the group's biggest commercial success.

Alphin and Goode left, to be replaced by Jim Smith and Andy Ware, and the band toured with both the Black Crowes and Hootie and the Blowfish, but the band split up in 1995 after demos for a fourth album were rejected by Mammoth.

In December 2000, they regrouped for a three-date tour and recorded a double-CD album, Live at the Cat's Cradle. They also did summer reunion tours in 2004 and 2005 to support the greatest hits album Best+. As of the mid-2010s, Dillon Fence were still performing occasionally.

Singer-songwriter Greg Humphreys' songs have been covered by bands like Hootie and the Blowfish (who used to open for them and later vice versa) and Letters to Cleo.

== Band members' other work ==
Greg Humphreys formed the soul-funk group Hobex, which has also featured Ware, and later the New York-based Greg Humphreys Electric Trio. Scott Carle was in Collapsis (Cherry/Universal) in 2000. Later he joined the B-Sides with Ken Mosher (Squirrel Nut Zippers) and future members of The Never. Next was Marat, a heavy rock band on MoRisen records which included members of the Veldt (DesWhite), Snatches of Pink (MikeRank) and on vocals, John Ensslin from What Peggy Wants. As of 2008, Carle is playing with Bull City, a four-piece rock outfit, and also with Lost In The Trees, a 13-piece orchestra on Trekky records. Kent Alphin formed Granger after Dillon Fence and included Carle and G.Gilbert. Chris Goode was in Straddlecat while in Seattle, WA.

== Discography ==
=== Albums ===
- Rosemary (1992), Mammoth
- Outside In (1993), Mammoth
- Living Room Scene (1994), Mammoth/Atlantic/Eastwest

Live albums

- Live at the Cat's Cradle (2001), Phrex

Compilations

- Best+ (2004), MoRisen

=== EPs, singles ===
- Dillon Fence EP (1989), NOCAR
- "Christmas" (1991), Mammoth
- Daylight EP (1992), Mammoth
- "Black Eyed Susan"/"The World's A Mess" (1993), Mammoth
- Any Other Way EP (1993), Mammoth
- Living Room Scene EP (1995), Mammoth
