= List of Deep Purple members =

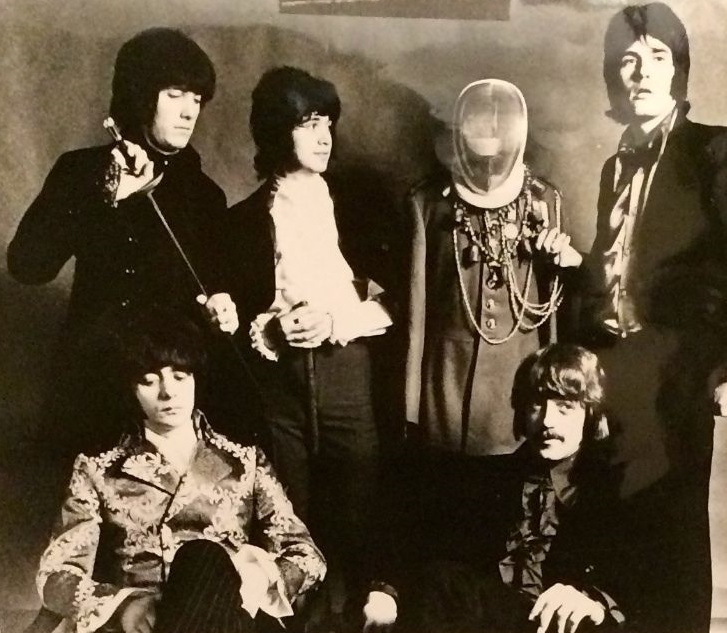
Deep Purple Mark I in 1968: (left to right) Nick Simper (top), Ritchie Blackmore (bottom), Ian Paice, Jon Lord and Rod Evans

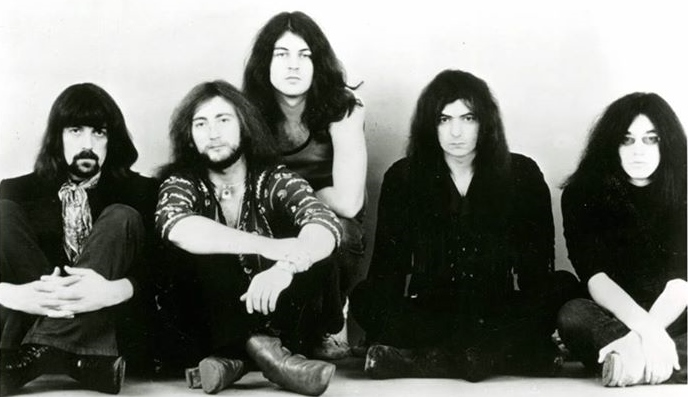
Deep Purple Mark II in 1971: (left to right) Jon Lord, Roger Glover, Ian Gillan, Ritchie Blackmore and Ian Paice

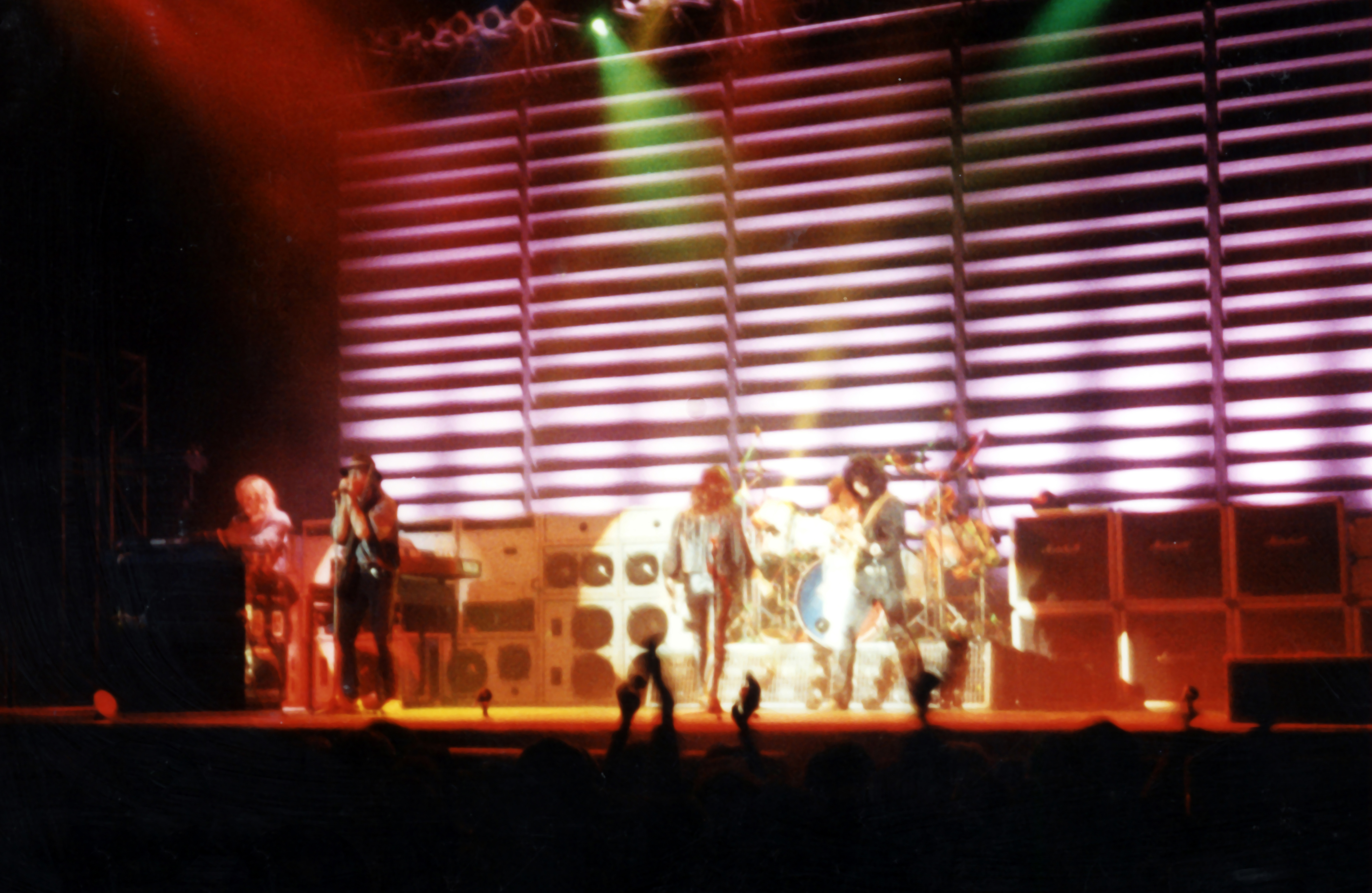
Deep Purple Mark V in 1991: (left to right) Jon Lord, Roger Glover, Joe Lynn Turner, Ian Paice and Ritchie Blackmore

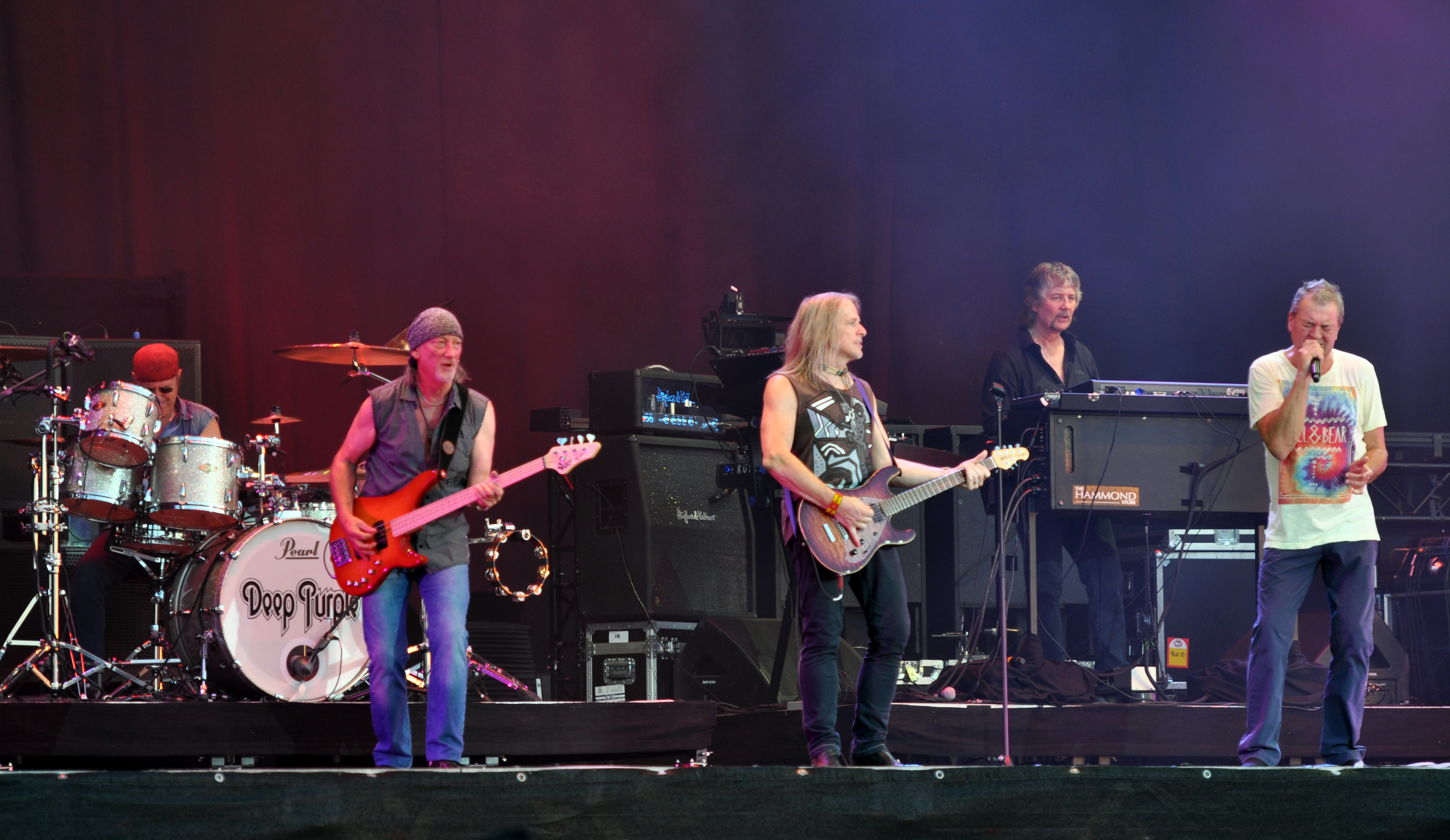
Deep Purple Mark VIII in 2013: (left to right) Ian Paice, Roger Glover, Steve Morse, Don Airey and Ian Gillan

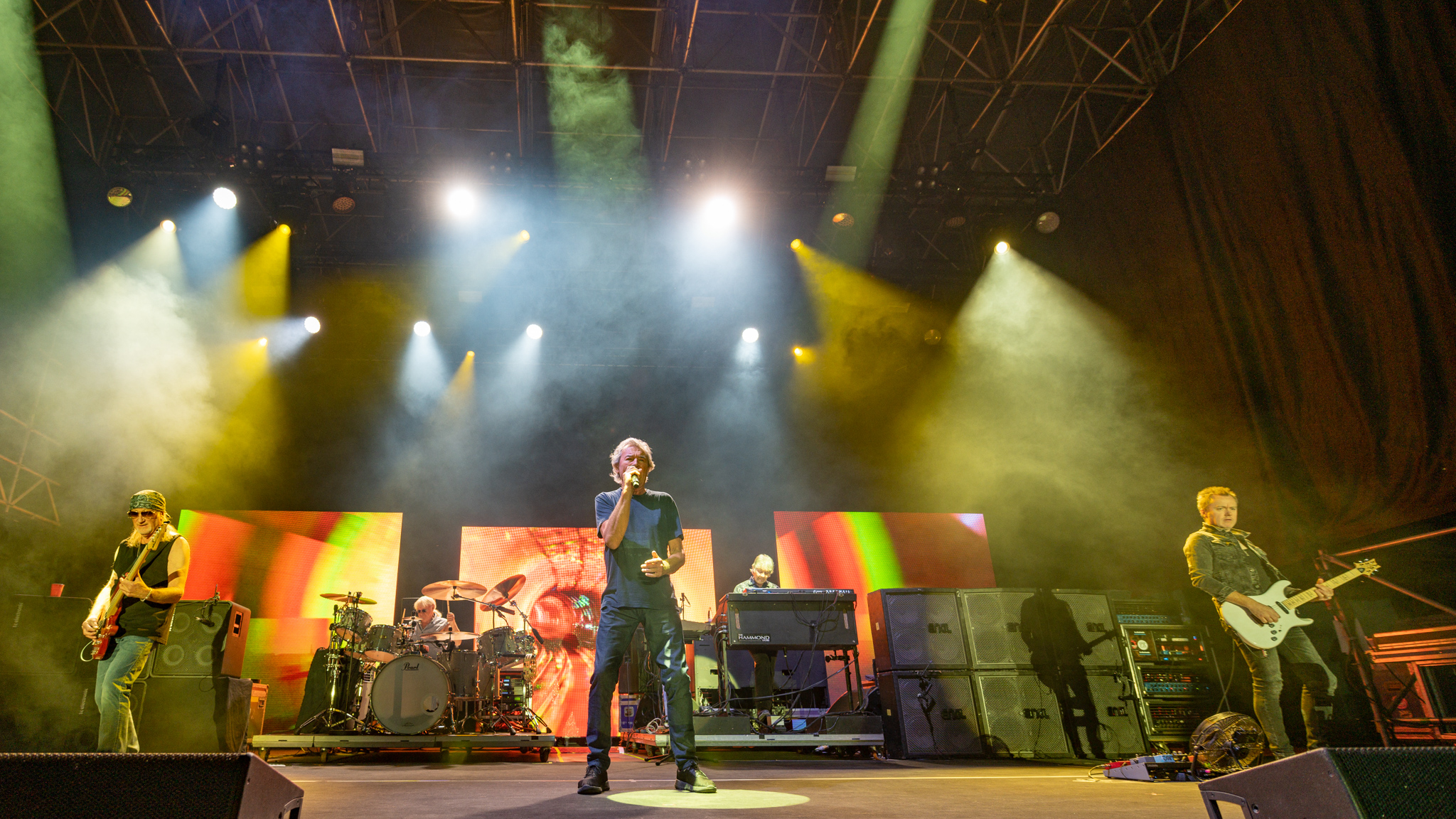
Deep Purple Mark IX in 2022: (left to right) Roger Glover, Ian Paice, Ian Gillan, Don Airey and Simon McBride

Deep Purple are a British hard rock band originally from London. Formed in March 1968, the group originally included guitarist Ritchie Blackmore, vocalist Rod Evans, keyboardist Jon Lord, drummer Ian Paice and bassist Nick Simper ("Mark I"). In mid-1969, Evans and Simper were replaced by Ian Gillan and Roger Glover ("Mark II"). After four years, Gillan and Glover departed in 1973, and were replaced by David Coverdale and Glenn Hughes ("Mark III"). Tommy Bolin replaced Blackmore in 1975 ("Mark IV"), with this lineup continuing until Deep Purple broke up in July 1976. The group re-formed in April 1984 with the "Mark II" lineup of Blackmore, Lord, Paice, Gillan and Glover. The current lineup, dubbed "Mark IX", features Paice, Gillan, Glover, keyboardist Don Airey and guitarist Simon McBride.

== History ==
=== 1968–1976 ===
Deep Purple were formed under the name Roundabout in March 1968 by keyboardist Jon Lord, bassist Nick Simper, guitarist Ritchie Blackmore, drummer Ian Paice and vocalist Rod Evans. Lord and Simper had previously played together with The Flower Pot Men, and Simper had earlier worked briefly with Blackmore; Paice and Evans were brought in from The Maze, whom Blackmore had seen performing. The group soon changed their name to Deep Purple, after the song of the same name by Nino Tempo & April Stevens. Deep Purple quickly recorded their first album Shades of Deep Purple, which was issued in July 1968. After The Book of Taliesyn and Deep Purple, Lord, Blackmore and Paice made the decision in May 1969 to dismiss Simper and Evans, wanting to pursue a heavier direction that they deemed the pair unsuitable for.

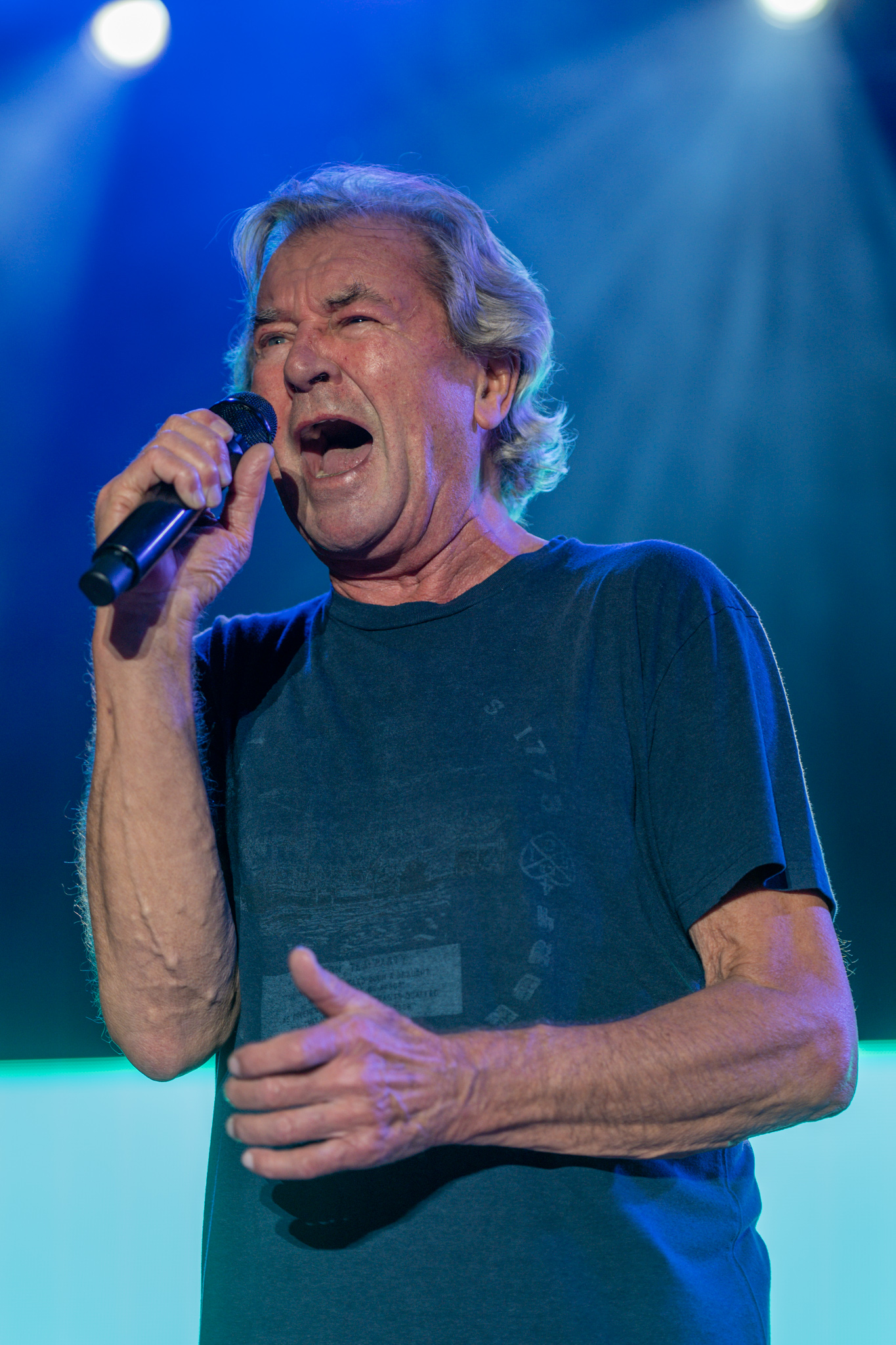
Ian Gillan replaced original lead vocalist Rod Evans in 1969 and stayed until 1973. He re-joined the band in 1984 but was fired in 1989. In 1992, he returned to the band and is still with them to this day.

By the time the original lineup, retroactively dubbed "Mark I", played their last show on 4 July 1969, new vocalist Ian Gillan and bassist Roger Glover had already been recruited from Episode Six. During its four-year tenure, the "Mark II" lineup established itself as the most commercially and critically acclaimed of the group's history, releasing the studio albums Deep Purple in Rock, Fireball, Machine Head and Who Do We Think We Are, in addition to the live albums Concerto for Group and Orchestra and Made in Japan. However, in October 1972, following increasing tensions and exhaustion, Gillan informed the rest of the band that he would be leaving after the remaining tour dates were completed. Glover followed the singer later in providing his resignation, believing that Blackmore wanted him to leave. The final show of the tour took place on 29 June 1973 in Osaka, Japan, after which Gillan and Glover both left and "Mark II" came to an end.

On 14 July 1973, it was announced in Melody Maker magazine that Glenn Hughes of Trapeze had replaced Glover on bass. Paul Rodgers, who had been a member of Free until their recent breakup, was initially offered the role of frontman, but he declined to focus on the formation of Bad Company. The position vacated by Gillan was later taken by David Coverdale, who auditioned in the summer and was unveiled as Deep Purple's new vocalist on 23 September 1973. After "Mark III" released Burn and Stormbringer, the creatively frustrated Blackmore recorded a self-titled debut album by a new project dubbed Ritchie Blackmore's Rainbow (later shortened to just Rainbow) in early 1975. This ultimately led to his departure from Deep Purple, which was officially announced on 21 June 1975. Despite Blackmore's core creative role in the band, Deep Purple continued with the addition of former James Gang guitarist Tommy Bolin. After just one album, Come Taste the Band, "Mark IV" played their final show on 15 March 1976, before breaking up officially on 19 July. Bolin died of a heroin overdose that December.

=== 1984 onward ===
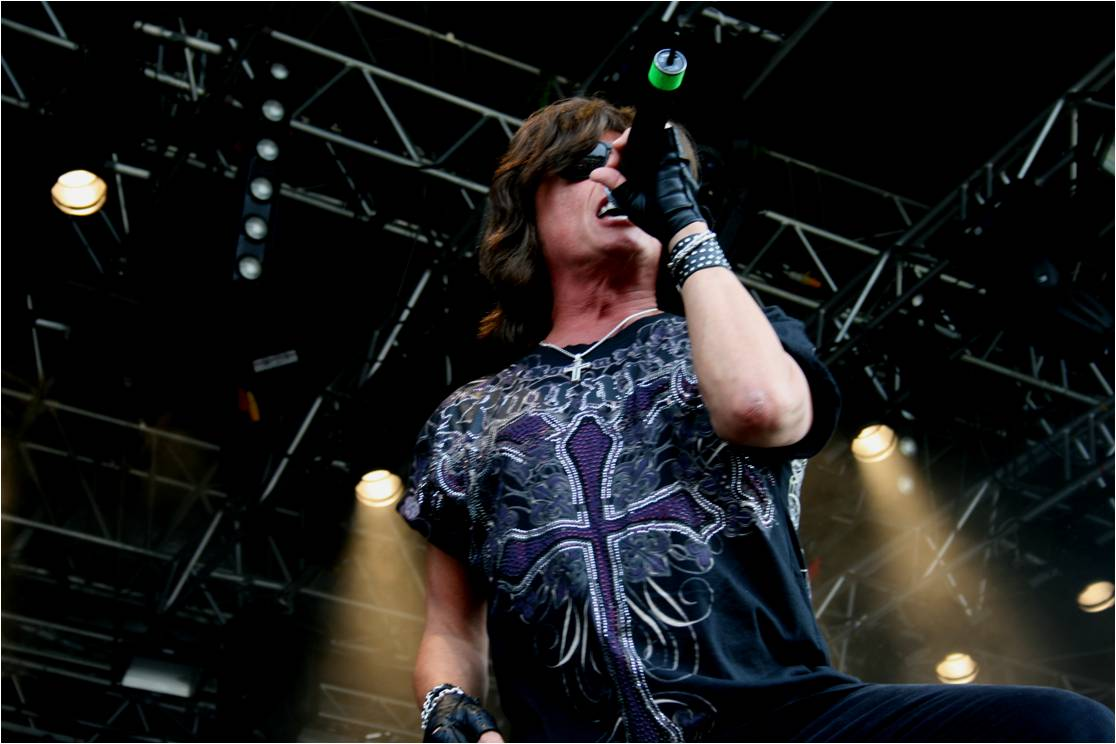
During Ian Gillan's 1989–1992 departure, he was replaced by Joe Lynn Turner, formerly of Rainbow (Blackmore's other band).

After eight years of inactivity, on 27 April 1984 it was announced that the "Mark II" lineup of Deep Purple were set to return for a worldwide tour and a new album. The reunion of Lord, Blackmore, Glover, Gillan and Paice lasted for five years and spawned two studio albums, Perfect Strangers and The House of Blue Light. By the middle of 1989, however, Gillan had left the group for a second time, with the other members firing him due to creative and personal differences. After auditioning and rehearsing with numerous potential replacements for the vocalist, the band eventually enlisted Joe Lynn Turner, who had previously worked with Blackmore and Glover in Rainbow, to take Gillan's place in December 1989. This "Mark V" lineup recorded just one album, Slaves and Masters, which was released in 1990 and promoted on tour throughout 1991.

In August 1992, despite having started work on the band's next album, Turner was suddenly dismissed from Deep Purple. Gillan subsequently returned for a third stint as lead vocalist, as management wanted the classic "Mark II" lineup back together for a planned 25th anniversary tour, and the band issued The Battle Rages On... in 1993. Blackmore was unhappy with Gillan's return and Turner's firing, however, which led to renewed and increasing tensions between the pair on the subsequent touring cycle. The guitarist played his final show with Deep Purple on 17 November 1993. The band added Joe Satriani in Blackmore's place for a string of pre-arranged tour dates, including shows in Japan and Europe starting in December. This "Mark VI" arrangement was only temporary, however, with the guitarist returning to his solo career at the end of the run in July 1994.

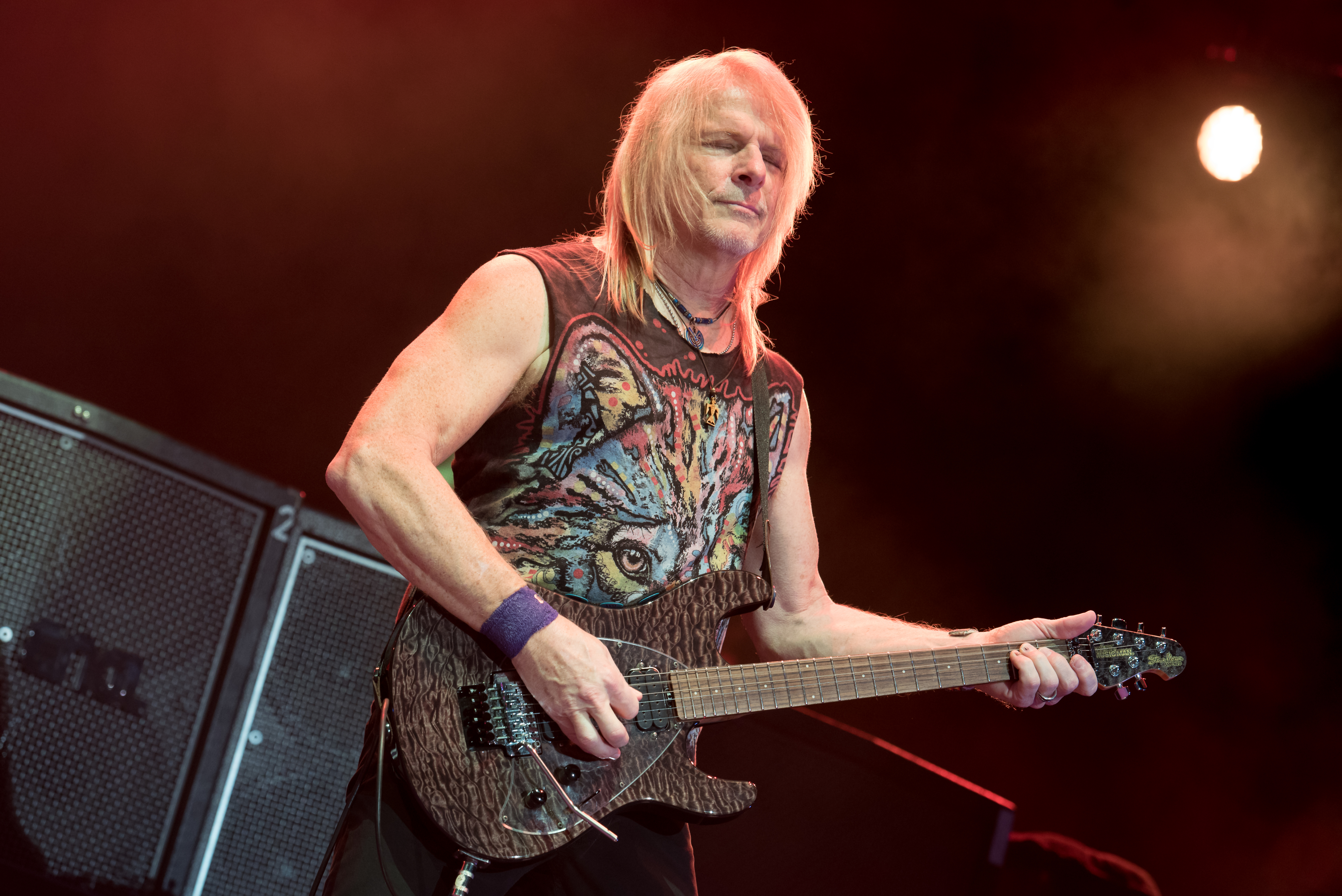
Steve Morse replaced temporary guitarist Joe Satriani in 1994 and stayed with the band until 2022 when he left to care for his ill wife and was replaced by Simon McBride.

Blackmore was eventually officially replaced by former Dixie Dregs and Kansas guitarist Steve Morse on August 17, 1994, who debuted with the band at three low-key gigs in November 1994 and was later offered the position permanently. The "Mark VII" lineup remained stable throughout the rest of the decade, releasing two studio albums in Purpendicular and Abandon. In March 2002, it was announced that Lord – a member of every lineup of Deep Purple to date – was set to amicably retire from the group, with Don Airey, who had previously worked with Glover in Rainbow, taking his place. The keyboardist's departure left Paice as the sole remaining constant member of the band. The "Mark VIII" lineup of Gillan, Morse, Glover, Airey and Paice released six studio albums: Bananas in 2003, Rapture of the Deep in 2005, Now What?! in 2013, Infinite in 2017, Whoosh! in 2020 and Turning to Crime in 2021. The lineup remained in place for exactly 20 years, until March 2022, when the band announced that Steve Morse would go on a hiatus and be replaced by Simon McBride, who has previously toured with both Ian Gillan and Don Airey. On 23 July 2022, it was announced that Steve Morse had permanently left. The first album with McBride, =1, was released in 2024, followed by Splat! in 2026. On 12 August 2026, Blackmore made a one-off return to Deep Purple at the Northwell at Jones Beach Theater in Wantagh, New York, joining the Mark IX lineup onstage for the encore performance of "Smoke on the Water". It was his first performance with the band since 1993.

== Members ==
=== Current ===
Image	Name	Years active	Instruments	Release contributions
	Ian Paice	1968–1976; 1984–present	drums; percussion	all Deep Purple releases
	Roger Glover	1969–1973; 1984–present	bass guitar; keyboards (1984–1990, 2021); backing vocals (2021)	all Deep Purple studio albums from Deep Purple in Rock (1970) to Who Do We Think We Are (1973), and from Perfect Strangers (1984) onward; all Deep Purple Marks II, VII and VIII live releases
	Ian Gillan	1969–1973; 1984–1989; 1992–present	vocals; percussion; harmonica	all Deep Purple studio albums from Deep Purple in Rock (1970) to Who Do We Think We Are (1973), Perfect Strangers (1984), The House of Blue Light (1987), and from The Battle Rages On... (1993) onward; all Deep Purple Marks II, VII and VIII live releases
	Don Airey	2002–present	keyboards	all Deep Purple studio albums from Bananas (2003) onward; all Deep Purple Mark VIII live releases
	Simon McBride	2022–present	guitar	all Deep Purple studio albums from =1 (2024) onward

=== Former ===
Image	Name	Years active	Instruments	Release contributions
	Jon Lord	1968–1976; 1984–2002 (died 2012)	keyboards; backing vocals (1968–1969); claves (1969)	all Deep Purple studio albums from Shades of Deep Purple (1968) to Abandon (1998); all Deep Purple Marks I–VII live releases
	Ritchie Blackmore	1968–1975; 1984–1993; 2026 (one-off)	guitar	all Deep Purple studio albums from Shades of Deep Purple (1968) to Stormbringer (1974), and from Perfect Strangers (1984) to The Battle Rages On... (1993); all Deep Purple Marks I–III live releases
	Rod Evans	1968–1969	vocals	Shades of Deep Purple (1968); The Book of Taliesyn (1968); Deep Purple (1969); all Deep Purple Mark I live releases
	Nick Simper	1968–1969	bass guitar; backing vocals	Shades of Deep Purple (1968); The Book of Taliesyn (1968); Deep Purple (1969); all Deep Purple Mark I live releases
	David Coverdale	1973–1976	vocals	Burn (1974); Stormbringer (1974); Come Taste the Band (1975); all Deep Purple Marks III–IV live releases
	Glenn Hughes	1973–1976	bass guitar; vocals	Burn (1974); Stormbringer (1974); Come Taste the Band (1975); all Deep Purple Marks III–IV live releases
	Tommy Bolin	1975–1976 (died 1976)	guitar; vocals; additional bass (1975)	Come Taste the Band (1975); all Deep Purple Mark IV live releases
	Joe Lynn Turner	1989–1992	vocals	Slaves and Masters (1990)
	Joe Satriani	1993–1994	guitar	none
	Steve Morse	1994–2022	guitar; backing vocals (1995)	all Deep Purple studio albums from Purpendicular (1996) to Turning to Crime (2021); all Deep Purple Marks VII–VIII live releases

=== Touring ===
Image	Name	Years active	Instruments	Notes
	Christopher Cross	1970	guitar	On 28 August 1970, Cross was a last-minute substitute for an ailing Ritchie Blackmore, at a concert in San Antonio, Texas at the Jam Factory.
	Randy California	1972 (died 1997)	guitar	On 6 April 1972, California filled in for Blackmore, who had contracted hepatitis, at a concert in Quebec.
	Candice Night	1993	backing vocals	Night performed backing vocals at select dates on Deep Purple's 1993 tour on the request of Blackmore.
	Nick Fyffe	2011; 2013	bass guitar	Ian Paice's son-in-law, Fyffe filled in for Roger Glover for a series of European dates in 2011 and one festival show in 2013.
	Jordan Rudess	2020	keyboards	Rudess filled in for Don Airey for one show in March 2020, while Airey was absent for undisclosed reasons.
	Adam Wakeman	2023	keyboards	Wakeman filled in for one show while Airey was absent due to an illness.

=== Session ===
Image	Name	Years active	Instruments	Release contributions
	Beth Hart	2003	backing vocals	Bananas (2003)
	Paul Buckmaster	2003 (died 2017)	string arrangement and cello	Bananas (2003)
	Michael Bradford	2003	guitar	Bananas (2003)
	Jason Roller	2012	acoustic guitar	Now What?! (2013)
	Eric Darken	2012	percussion	Now What?! (2013)
	Mike Johnson	2012	steel guitar	Now What?! (2013)
	David Hamilton	2012	additional keyboards	Now What?! (2013)
	Students of Nimbus School of Recording Arts	2012	gang vocals	Now What?! (2013)
	Bob Ezrin	2012; 2016; 2020; 2021	vocals; percussion; additional keyboards	Now What?! (2013); Infinite (2017); Whoosh! (2020); Turning to Crime (2021)
	Tommy Denander	2016	additional guitar	Infinite (2017)
	Saam Hashemi	2020	programming	Whoosh! (2020)
	Ayana George	2020	backing vocals	Whoosh! (2020)
	Tiffany Palmer	2020	backing vocals	Whoosh! (2020)
	Nicole Thalia	2021	backing vocals	Turning to Crime (2021)
	Marsha B. Morrison	2021	backing vocals	Turning to Crime (2021)
	Leo Green	2021	tenor saxophone; horns arrangement	Turning to Crime (2021)
	Matt Holland	2021	trumpet	Turning to Crime (2021)
	Gina Forsyth	2021	fiddle	Turning to Crime (2021)
	Bruce Daigrepont	2021	squeeze box	Turning to Crime (2021)
	Julian Shank	2021	percussion	Turning to Crime (2021)

== Lineups ==
Lineup (period)	Members	Studio albums	Live albums
Mark I (March 1968 – July 1969)	Ian Paice – drums, percussion; Jon Lord – keyboards, backing vocals; Ritchie Blackmore – guitars; Rod Evans – lead vocals; Nick Simper – bass guitar, backing vocals	Shades of Deep Purple (1968); The Book of Taliesyn (1968); Deep Purple (1969)	Inglewood (2002) / Live at Inglewood 1968 (2009); BBC Sessions 1968–1970 (2011, disc 1)
Mark II (July 1969 – June 1973)	Ian Paice – drums, percussion; Jon Lord – keyboards; Ritchie Blackmore – guitars; Ian Gillan – vocals, percussion, harmonica; Roger Glover – bass guitar	Deep Purple in Rock (1970); Fireball (1971); Machine Head (1972); Who Do We Think We Are (1973)	Concerto for Group and Orchestra (1969); Made in Japan (1972) / Live in Japan (1993); Deep Purple in Concert (1980); Scandinavian Nights (1988) / Live in Stockholm (2005) / Stockholm 1970 (2014); Gemini Suite Live (1993); Space Vol 1 & 2 (2001) / Live in Aachen 1970 (2005); Live in Denmark '72 (2002) / Copenhagen 1972 (2013); Kneel & Pray (2004) / Live in Montreux 1969 (2006); New Live & Rare (2004); BBC Sessions 1968–1970 (2011, disc 2); Long Beach 1971 (2015)
Mark III (September 1973 – April 1975)	Ian Paice – drums, percussion; Jon Lord – keyboards; Ritchie Blackmore – guitars; David Coverdale – vocals; Glenn Hughes – bass guitar, vocals	Burn (1974); Stormbringer (1974)	Made in Europe (1976) / Mk III: The Final Concerts (1996); Live in London (1982); California Jamming (1996) / Just Might Take Your Life (2003); Live in Paris 1975 (2001) / Paris 1975 (2012); Perks and Tit (2004) / Live in San Diego 1974 (2007); Graz 1975 (2014)
Mark IV (June 1975 – March 1976)	Ian Paice – drums, percussion; Jon Lord – keyboards; David Coverdale – vocals; Glenn Hughes – bass guitar, vocals; Tommy Bolin – guitars, vocals	Come Taste the Band (1975)	Last Concert in Japan (1977) / This Time Around: Live in Tokyo (2001); On the Wings of a Russian Foxbat (1995) / Long Beach 1976 (2016); Days May Come and Days May Go (2000); 1420 Beachwood Drive (2000); Phoenix Rising (2011)
Band inactive July 1976 – April 1984
Mark II (reunion) (April 1984 – December 1989)	Ian Paice – drums, percussion; Jon Lord – keyboards; Ritchie Blackmore – guitars; Ian Gillan – vocals, percussion, harmonica; Roger Glover – bass guitar, keyboards	Perfect Strangers (1984); The House of Blue Light (1987)	Nobody's Perfect (1988); In the Absence of Pink (1991); The Bootleg Series (2000, discs 1–6); Perfect Strangers Live (2013)
Mark V (December 1989 – August 1992)	Ian Paice – drums, percussion; Jon Lord – keyboards; Ritchie Blackmore – guitars; Roger Glover – bass guitar, keyboards; Joe Lynn Turner – vocals	Slaves and Masters (1990)	none
Mark II (second reunion) (August 1992 – November 1993)	Ian Paice – drums, percussion; Jon Lord – keyboards; Ritchie Blackmore – guitars; Roger Glover – bass guitar; Ian Gillan – vocals, percussion, harmonica	The Battle Rages On... (1993)	Come Hell or High Water (1994) / Live in Europe 1993 (2006); The Bootleg Series (2000, discs 7 and 8)
Mark VI (November 1993 – July 1994)	Ian Paice – drums, percussion; Jon Lord – keyboards; Roger Glover – bass guitar; Ian Gillan – vocals, percussion, harmonica; Joe Satriani – guitars	none	
Mark VII (July 1994 – March 2002)	Ian Paice – drums, percussion; Jon Lord – keyboards; Roger Glover – bass guitar; Ian Gillan – vocals, percussion, harmonica; Steve Morse – guitars	Purpendicular (1996); Abandon (1998)	Live at The Olympia '96 (1997); Total Abandon: Australia '99 (1999); In Concert with The London Symphony Orchestra (2000); The Bootleg Series (2000, discs 9–12); Live at the Rotterdam Ahoy (2001); The Soundboard Series (2001); Live Encounters (2004); Live at Montreux 1996 (2006); Live in Newcastle 2001 (2019); Live In Wollongong 2001 (2021); Live in London 2002 (2021); Bombay Calling (2022); Live in Hong Kong 2001 (2022)
Mark VIII (March 2002 – March 2022)	Ian Paice – drums, percussion; Roger Glover – bass guitar; Ian Gillan – vocals, percussion, harmonica; Steve Morse – guitars; Don Airey – keyboards	Bananas (2003); Rapture of the Deep (2005); Now What?! (2013); Infinite (2017); Whoosh! (2020); Turning to Crime (2021)	Live at Montreux 2006 (2007); Live at Montreux 2011 (2011); The Now What?! Live Tapes (2013); Live in Verona (2014); From the Setting Sun... (2015); ...to the Rising Sun (2015); The Infinite Live Recordings, Vol. 1 (2017); Live in Rome 2013 (2019)
Mark IX (April 2022 – present)	Ian Paice – drums, percussion; Roger Glover – bass guitar; Ian Gillan – vocals, percussion, harmonica; Don Airey – keyboards; Simon McBride – guitars	=1 (2024); Splat! (2026)	none
