= Around the World Live =

Video by Deep Purple
- Released: 19 May 2008
- Recorded: 1995–2007
- Genre: Hard rock, heavy metal
- Length: 541:00
- Label: Eagle Vision

Deep Purple chronology
| Live at Montreux 2006: They All Came Down to Montreux (2007) | Around the World Live (2008) | History, Hits & Highlights '68–'76 (2009) |

Around the World Live is a four-DVD box-set by English hard rock band Deep Purple, released in May 2008.

== Overview ==
The Around the World Live box-set features concert footages covering four Deep Purple's live performances during their World Tour over a seven-year period from 1995 to 2002 (three full length concerts in India, Australia and the U.K., with highlights of a fourth in South Korea), plus a documentary film tracing the history of the band from the early days through to the arrival of guitarist Steve Morse, including rare footage, interviews, after-show parties and the band on the road, during the tour. Extensive liner notes were supplied by the author Joel McIver. Live performances are from the Purpendicular and Abandon tours.

The two first DVDs from this box-set have already been released: Bombay Calling in 2004 and Total Abandon: Australia '99 in 1999.

Live at the NEC, England 2002, DVD3 from this box-set, contains exclusive live-material, when Deep Purple former organist and keyboardist Jon Lord joined the band on stage for several songs at the NEC (in Solihull, England), playing with current keyboardist Don Airey.

The Access All Areas DVD is the definitive documentary of Deep Purple from 1968 to 2007, emphasising the Steve Morse era. DVD4 in the present box set, listed below as "Documentary film about the Steve Morse era", is a 90-minute edit of a fly-on-the-wall 'Access All Areas', which has been in production for some years.

Indeed, following the Total Abandon tour of Australia in 1999, it was decided to document life on the road with the band. Collated primarily over a four-year period and starting in Japan 2000, Ian Gillan, Ian Paice and Drew Thompson collected vision from the tours.

According to Drew: "it's an amazing insight into life on the road, and takes a look at elements of touring never really seen. It was never meant to showcase the performances from this period, but shows life on the road as it really happens; the fun, the humour, the politics and the camaraderie. The transition period of Jon Lord leaving the band and Don Airey reinvigorating proceedings has been captured at close hand, beautifully complementing the live NEC performance. This is a must see for any fan of the band."

The full "Access All Area" documentary runs to beyond 3 hours, and has been edited down for the new DVD package. Drew expects that later in 2008 a full-length version will be released. If it is, that may leave the NEC 2002 show as the only disc exclusive to 'Around The World'. The new documentary leans heavily on material which first appeared on the Gillancam feature on Ian Gillan's 2007 effort Highway Star.

== DVD features ==
=== DVD1 – Bombay Calling, India 1995 ===
1. "Fireball"
2. "Maybe I'm a Leo"
3. "Black Night"
4. "The Battle Rages On"
5. "Woman from Tokyo"
6. "The Purpendicular Waltz"
7. "When a Blind Man Cries"
8. "Perfect Strangers"
9. "Pictures of Home"
10. "Child in Time"
11. "Anya"
12. "Space Truckin'"
13. "Guitar Solo"
14. "Lazy" (inc. Ian Paice drum solo)
15. "Speed King"
16. "Highway Star"
17. "Smoke on the Water"

Bonus Features – Live in Seoul, South Korea, 1995 (only highlights):

1. "Black Night"
2. "Woman from Tokyo"
3. "When a Blind Man Cries"
4. "Perfect Strangers"
5. "Child in Time"
6. "Speed King"
7. "Highway Star"
8. "Smoke on the Water"

=== DVD2 – Total Abandon, Australia 1999 ===
1. "Vavoom: Ted the Mechanic"
2. "Strange Kind of Woman"
3. "Bloodsucker"
4. "Pictures of Home"
5. "Almost Human"
6. "Woman from Tokyo"
7. "Watching the Sky"
8. "Fireball"
9. "Sometimes I Feel Like Screaming"
10. "Guitar Solo"
11. "Smoke on the Water"
12. "Lazy"
13. "Perfect Strangers"
14. "Speed King" (with drum solo)
15. "Black Night"
16. "Highway Star"

Bonus Feature: A Band Down Under – Documentary 1999

=== DVD3 – Live at the NEC, England 2002 ===
1. "Fireball" (Blackmore, Gillan, Glover, Lord, Paice)
2. "Woman from Tokyo" (Blackmore, Gillan, Glover, Lord, Paice)
3. "Mary Long" (Blackmore, Gillan, Glover, Lord, Paice)
4. "Vavoom: Ted the Mechanic" (Gillan, Glover, Lord, Morse, Paice)
5. "Lazy" (Blackmore, Gillan, Glover, Lord, Paice)
6. "The Well Dressed Guitar" (Morse)
7. "When a Blind Man Cries" (Blackmore, Gillan, Glover, Lord, Paice)
8. "Space Truckin'" (Blackmore, Gillan, Glover, Lord, Paice)
9. "Keyboard Solo" (Airey, Bach, Williams...)
10. "Perfect Strangers" (Blackmore, Gillan, Glover)
11. "Speed King" (with bass and drum solo and a Rock 'n' roll medley) (Blackmore, Gillan, Glover, Lord, Paice)
12. "Guitar Solo" (instrumental) (Morse)
13. "Smoke on the Water" (Blackmore, Gillan, Glover, Lord, Paice)
14. "Hush" (South)
15. "Black Night" (Blackmore, Gillan, Glover, Lord, Paice)
16. "Highway Star" (Blackmore, Gillan, Glover, Lord, Paice)

Bonus Feature: Ian Gillan & Roger Glover interview, Hong Kong, 2001.

=== DVD4 – Access All Areas ===
The definitive documentary of Deep Purple in the Steve Morse era.

== Release history ==
Around The World Live is already being sold in Europe, at amazon.com. You can pre-order it from UK, Germany and from France

Release dates:

1. Europe: (Germany, UK, France) – 19 May 2008
2. North America: (USA, Canada) – 17 June 2008

== Personnel ==
- Ian Gillan – vocals, harmonica, congas
- Jon Lord – keyboards, organ
- Don Airey – keyboards, organ (on NEC 2002 show only, with Jon Lord)
- Steve Morse – guitar
- Roger Glover – bass
- Ian Paice – drums

== Charts ==
| Year | Chart | Position |
|---|---|---|
| 2008 | Switzerland | 7 |
| 2008 | Germany | 34 |

== Certifications ==
Certifications for Around the World Live
| Region | Certification | Certified units/sales |
|---|---|---|
| Australia (ARIA) | Gold | 7,500^{^} |
^{^} Shipments figures based on certification alone.
