= Live at Montreux 1996 =

2006 live album by Deep Purple

Live album by Deep Purple
- Released: May 2006
- Recorded: Montreux Jazz Festival, Montreux, Switzerland, 9 July 1996 and 22 July 2000
- Genres: Hard rock, heavy metal
- Length: 74:16
- Label: Eagle

Deep Purple live albums chronology
Live in Europe 1993 (2006)	Live at Montreux 1996 (2006)	Live in Montreux 69 (2006)

Live at Montreux 1996

Video by Deep Purple
- Released: May 2006
- Recorded: Montreux Jazz Festival, Montreux, Switzerland, 9 July 1996 and 22 July 2000
- Genre: Hard rock
- Length: 83:45, 1996 concert 38:27, 2000 concert
- Label: Eagle Rock Entertainment

Deep Purple chronology
Bombay Calling (1995)	Live at Montreux 1996 (2006)	Total Abandon: Australia '99 (1999)

Professional ratings
Review scores
Source	Rating
Allmusic	3.5/5 stars

Live at Montreux 1996 is a live album and DVD by English hard rock band Deep Purple, recorded in 1996 and released in 2006.

The CD and DVD release features live performances from Montreux in 1996 and 2000.

== CD track listing ==
All songs written by Ritchie Blackmore, Ian Gillan, Roger Glover, Jon Lord, and Ian Paice except where noted.

1. "Fireball" – 3:50
2. "Ted the Mechanic" (Gillan, Steve Morse, Glover, Lord, Paice) – 4:27
3. "Pictures of Home" – 5:41
4. "Black Night" – 6:43
5. "Woman from Tokyo" – 5:21
6. "No One Came" – 5:06
7. "When a Blind Man Cries" – 7:29
  - Credited to Gillan, Morse, Glover, Lord and Paice on this release
8. "Hey Cisco" (Gillan, Morse, Glover, Lord, Paice) – 5:47
9. "Speed King" – 5:10
10. "Smoke on the Water" – 8:15

=== Bonus Tracks ===
Recorded at the Montreux Jazz Festival, Montreux, Switzerland; 22 July 2000

11. "Sometimes I Feel Like Screaming" (Gillan, Morse, Glover, Lord, Paice) – 6:46
12. "Fools" – 9:41

== DVD track listing ==
=== Montreux – July 1996 ===
1. "Fireball"
2. "Ted the Mechanic"
3. "Pictures of Home"
4. "Black Night"
5. "Cascades: I'm Not Your Lover"
6. "Woman from Tokyo"
7. "No One Came"
8. "When a Blind Man Cries"
9. "Hey Cisco"
10. "Speed King"
11. "Smoke on the Water"

=== Montreux – July 2000 ===
1. "'69"
2. "Perfect Strangers"
3. "When a Blind Man Cries"
4. "Lazy"
5. "Highway Star"

== Personnel ==
- Ian Gillan – vocals
- Steve Morse – guitars
- Roger Glover – bass
- Jon Lord – keyboards
- Ian Paice – drums

== Charts ==
Year	Chart	Position
2006	Germany	92

=== Certifications [DVD] ===
Region	Certification	Certified units/sales
Canada (Music Canada)	Gold	5,000^{^}
^{^} Shipments figures based on certification alone.
