= 30: Very Best of Deep Purple =

Greatest hits album by Deep Purple
- Released: 12 October 1998
- Recorded: 1968–1998
- Genres: Hard rock, heavy metal
- Length: 77:45 (single CD version) 138:04 (double CD version)
- Label: EMI
- Producer: Deep Purple

Deep Purple compilations chronology
| Smoke on the Water: The Best Of (1992) | 30: Very Best of Deep Purple (1998) | Smoke on the Water (1998) |

Professional ratings
Review scores
| Source | Rating |
|---|---|
| Allmusic | 4/5 stars |

30: Very Best of Deep Purple is a 1998 compilation album by English rock band Deep Purple, celebrating 30th anniversary of the band. There are two CD versions of the album, a single CD and a double CD, and a vinyl version, a double LP printed on purple vinyl, with the track listing being identical to the single CD version.

The single CD version concentrates on the greatest hits of Deep Purple through the years, and contains mostly edited single versions of the songs, for example "Child in Time", which was over ten minutes long in its original form on the album Deep Purple in Rock. The double CD "Special Collectors Edition" is more in-depth, containing full versions of all the songs.

The album was certified Gold on 2 December 2005 by the BPI, selling 100,000 copies in the UK and reaching the Top 40. It peaked on the Australian charts at number 41.

== Single CD version ==
=== Track listing ===
All tracks are written by Ritchie Blackmore, Ian Gillan, Roger Glover, Jon Lord and Ian Paice, except where noted.

| No. | Title | Writer(s) | Original Album | Length |
|---|---|---|---|---|
| 1. | "Hush" (30th anniversary remaster) | Joe South | 1968 – Shades of Deep Purple | 4:28 |
| 2. | "Black Night" (Single version remaster) | | 1970 – "Black Night" single | 3:29 |
| 3. | "Speed King" (Single version) | | 1970 – Deep Purple in Rock | 4:27 |
| 4. | "Child in Time" (Single edit) | | 1970 – Deep Purple in Rock | 4:15 |
| 5. | "Strange Kind of Woman" (Single version) | | 1971 – Fireball | 3:53 |
| 6. | "Fireball" | | 1971 – Fireball | 3:26 |
| 7. | "Demon's Eye" | | 1971 – Fireball | 5:19 |
| 8. | "Smoke on the Water" (25th anniversary remaster) | | 1972 – Machine Head | 5:43 |
| 9. | "Highway Star" (1997 remix) | | 1972 – Machine Head | 6:32 |
| 10. | "When a Blind Man Cries" (1997 remix) | | 1972 – "Never Before" single | 3:31 |
| 11. | "Never Before" (Single edit) | | 1972 – Machine Head | 3:30 |
| 12. | "Woman from Tokyo" (Single edit) | | 1973 – Who Do We Think We Are | 2:47 |
| 13. | "Burn" (Single edit) | David Coverdale, Blackmore, Lord, Paice | 1974 – Burn | 4:33 |
| 14. | "Stormbringer" | Blackmore, Coverdale | 1974 – Stormbringer | 4:07 |
| 15. | "You Keep on Moving" (Single edit) | Coverdale, Glenn Hughes | 1975 – Come Taste the Band | 4:30 |
| 16. | "Perfect Strangers" (Single edit) | Blackmore, Gillan, Glover | 1984 – Perfect Strangers | 4:16 |
| 17. | "Vavoom: Ted the Mechanic" | Gillan, Steve Morse, Glover, Lord, Paice | 1996 – Purpendicular | 4:19 |
| 18. | "Any Fule Kno That" | Gillan, Morse, Glover, Lord, Paice | 1998 – Abandon | 4:27 |

=== Credits ===
- Ritchie Blackmore – guitar on tracks 1–14, and 16
- Jon Lord – keyboards on all tracks, backing vocals on track 1
- Ian Paice – drums on all tracks
- Nick Simper – bass and backing vocals on track 1
- Rod Evans – vocals on track 1
- Ian Gillan – vocals 2–12, and 16–18
- Roger Glover – bass and backing vocals on tracks 2–12 and 16–18
- David Coverdale – vocals on tracks 13–15
- Glenn Hughes – bass and vocals on tracks 13–15
- Tommy Bolin – guitar on track 15
- Steve Morse – guitar on tracks 17–18

== Double CD version ==
=== Track listing ===
All tracks are written by Ritchie Blackmore, Ian Gillan, Roger Glover, Jon Lord and Ian Paice, except where noted.

Disc One
| No. | Title | Writer(s) | Original Album | Length |
|---|---|---|---|---|
| 1. | "Hush" | Joe South | 1968 – Shades of Deep Purple | 4:28 |
| 2. | "Mandrake Root" | Rod Evans, Blackmore, Lord | 1968 – Shades of Deep Purple | 6:11 |
| 3. | "Kentucky Woman" | Neil Diamond | 1968 – The Book of Taliesyn | 4:43 |
| 4. | "Wring That Neck" | Blackmore, Nick Simper, Lord, Paice | 1968 – The Book of Taliesyn | 5:14 |
| 5. | "The Bird Has Flown" | Evans, Blackmore, Lord | single b-side version | 2:54 |
| 6. | "Emmaretta" | Evans, Blackmore, Lord | single | 3:00 |
| 7. | "Hallelujah" | Roger Greenaway, Roger Cook | single | 3:43 |
| 8. | "Black Night" | | single | 3:29 |
| 9. | "Speed King" | | 1970 – Deep Purple in Rock | 5:53 |
| 10. | "Bloodsucker" | | 1970 – Deep Purple in Rock | 4:13 |
| 11. | "Child in Time" | | 1970 – Deep Purple in Rock | 10:17 |
| 12. | "Strange Kind of Woman" | | single (UK) and 1971 – Fireball (USA) | 3:53 |
| 13. | "Fireball" | | 1971 – Fireball | 3:26 |
| 14. | "Demon's Eye" | | 1971 – Fireball | 5:19 |
| 15. | "When a Blind Man Cries (1997 Remix)" | | single b-side | 3:31 |

Disc Two
| No. | Title | Writer(s) | Original Album | Length |
|---|---|---|---|---|
| 1. | "Highway Star (1997 remix)" | | 1972 – Machine Head | 6:32 |
| 2. | "Smoke on the Water (Single Version)" | | 1972 – Machine Head | 5:43 |
| 3. | "Never Before" | | 1972 – Machine Head | 4:01 |
| 4. | "Woman from Tokyo" | | 1973 – Who Do We Think We Are | 5:51 |
| 5. | "Burn" | David Coverdale, Blackmore, Lord, Paice | 1974 – Burn | 6:03 |
| 6. | "Might Just Take Your Life" | Blackmore, Coverdale, Lord, Paice | 1974 – Burn | 4:39 |
| 7. | "Stormbringer" | Blackmore, Coverdale | 1974 – Stormbringer | 4:07 |
| 8. | "You Keep on Moving" | Coverdale, Glenn Hughes | 1975 – Come Taste the Band | 5:19 |
| 9. | "Perfect Strangers" | Blackmore, Gillan, Glover | 1984 – Perfect Strangers | 5:21 |
| 10. | "Knocking at Your Back Door" | Gillan, Blackmore, Glover | 1984 – Perfect Strangers | 7:03 |
| 11. | "King of Dreams" | Joe Lynn Turner, Blackmore, Glover | 1990 – Slaves & Masters | 5:29 |
| 12. | "Ted the Mechanic" | Gillan, Steve Morse, Glover, Lord, Paice | 1996 – Purpendicular | 4:19 |
| 13. | "Any Fule Kno That" | Gillan, Morse, Glover, Lord, Paice | 1998 – Abandon | 4:27 |

=== Credits ===
- Ritchie Blackmore – guitar on disc 1 tracks 1–15, disc 2 tracks 1–7 and 9–11
- Jon Lord – keyboards on all tracks, backing vocals on disc 1 tracks 1–6
- Ian Paice – drums on all tracks
- Rod Evans – lead vocals on disc 1 tracks 1–6
- Nick Simper – bass & backing vocals on disc 1 tracks 1–6
- Ian Gillan – vocals on disc 1 tracks 7–15, disc 2 tracks 1–4, 9–10, and 12–13
- Roger Glover – bass on disc 1 tracks 7–15, disc 2 tracks 1–4 and 9–13
- David Coverdale – lead vocals on disc 2 tracks 5–8
- Glenn Hughes – bass & vocals on disc 2 tracks 5–8
- Tommy Bolin – guitar on disc 2 track 8
- Joe Lynn Turner – vocals on disc 2 track 11
- Steve Morse – guitar on disc 2 tracks 12–13

== Charts ==
| Chart (1998–1999) | Peak position |
|---|---|
| Australian Albums (ARIA) | 41 |
| Belgian Albums (Ultratop Flanders) | 92 |
| Finnish Albums (Suomen virallinen lista) | 16 |
| German Albums (Offizielle Top 100) | 73 |
| Swedish Albums (Sverigetopplistan) | 18 |
| UK Albums (Official Charts) | 39 |

| Chart (2005) | Peak position |
|---|---|
| Spanish Albums (Promusicae) | 30 |

== Certifications ==
| Region | Certification | Certified units/sales |
|---|---|---|
| Argentina (CAPIF) | Gold | 30,000^{^} |
| United Kingdom (BPI) | Gold | 100,000^{^} |
^{^} Shipments figures based on certification alone.
