= The Soundboard Series =

Box set of live albums by Deep Purple
- Released: 26 October 2001
- Recorded: 2001
- Genres: Hard rock, blues rock, heavy metal
- Length: 12:46:31
- Label: Thames Thompson
- Producer: Drew Thompson

Deep Purple live albums chronology
This Time Around: Live in Tokyo (2001)	The Soundboard Series (2001)	Live in Paris 1975 (2001)

The Soundboard Series is a live box set recorded and released by the band Deep Purple in 2001. The set contains six double CDs featuring recordings from six different concerts. Two of the concerts feature the band's rarely performed Concerto for Group and Orchestra, with Ian Gillan singing Pictured Within.

== Personnel ==
- Ian Gillan – lead vocals
- Steve Morse – guitars
- Roger Glover – bass guitar
- Ian Paice – drums, percussion
- Jon Lord – organ, keyboards

Additional musicians (Melbourne, Wollongong, Newcastle, Hong Kong)

- Greg Maundrell – trumpet
- Charles MacInnes – trombone
- Paul Williamson – saxophone
- Billie Stapleton – backing vocals
- Angie Stapleton – backing vocals
- Natalie Miller – backing vocals

Additional musicians (Tokyo)

- New Japan Select Orchestra conducted by Paul Mann
- Big Horns Bee horn section

== CD track listing ==
All songs written by Ian Gillan, Ritchie Blackmore, Roger Glover, Jon Lord and Ian Paice except where noted.

=== Melbourne 2001 ===
==== Disc one ====
1. "Woman from Tokyo" – 6:41
2. "Ted the Mechanic" (Gillan, Steve Morse, Glover, Lord, Paice) – 5:10
3. "Mary Long" – 5:37
4. "Lazy" – 6:01
5. "No One Came" – 5:23
6. "Black Night" – 6:40
7. "Sometimes I Feel Like Screaming" (Gillan, Morse, Glover, Lord, Paice) – 7:21
8. "'69" (Gillan, Morse, Glover, Lord, Paice) – 8:53
9. "Smoke on the Water" – 9:04
10. "Perfect Strangers" (Gillan, Blackmore, Glover) – 8:42

==== Disc two ====
11. "Hey Cisco" (Gillan, Morse, Glover, Lord, Paice)- 6:28
12. "When a Blind Man Cries" – 7:27
13. "Fools" – 10:04
14. "Speed King" – 16:26
15. "Hush" (Joe South) – 5:52
16. "Highway Star" – 7:58
- Recorded on 9 March at the Melbourne Rod Laver Arena

=== Wollongong 2001 ===
==== Disc one ====
1. "Woman from Tokyo" – 6:32
2. "Ted the Mechanic" (Gillan, Morse, Glover, Lord, Paice) – 5:04
3. "Mary Long" – 5:20
4. "Lazy" – 6:07
5. "No One Came" – 5:49
6. "Black Night" – 7:23
7. "Sometimes I Feel Like Screaming" (Gillan, Morse, Glover, Lord, Paice) – 7:47
8. "Fools" – 10:28
9. "Perfect Strangers" (Gillan, Blackmore, Glover) – 8:20

==== Disc two ====
10. "Hey Cisco" (Gillan, Morse, Glover, Lord, Paice) – 6:34
11. "When a Blind Man Cries" – 7:44
12. "Smoke on the Water" – 10:24
13. "Speed King" (medley with "Good Times", featuring Jimmy Barnes on vocals) – 15:40
14. "Hush" (South) – 4:24
15. "Highway Star" – 7:36
- Recorded on 13 March at the Wollongong Entertainment Centre

=== Newcastle 2001 ===
==== Disc one ====
1. "Woman From Tokyo" – 6:14
2. "Ted the Mechanic" (Gillan, Morse, Glover, Lord, Paice) – 5:11
3. "Mary Long" – 5:56
4. "Lazy" – 6:03
5. "No One Came" – 5:37
6. "Black Night" – 7:22
7. "Sometimes I Feel Like Screaming" (Gillan, Morse, Glover, Lord, Paice) – 7:27
8. "Fools" – 9:23
9. "Perfect Strangers" (Gillan, Blackmore, Glover)- 9:30

==== Disc two ====
10. "Hey Cisco" (Gillan, Morse, Glover, Lord, Paice) – 6:19
11. "When a Blind Man Cries" – 7:26
12. "Smoke on the Water" – 10:20
13. "Speed King" (medley with "Good Times", featuring Jimmy Barnes on vocals) – 16:59
14. "Hush" (South) – 4:18
15. "Highway Star" – 7:24
- Recorded on 14 March at the Newcastle Entertainment Centre

=== Hong Kong 2001 ===
==== Disc one ====
1. "Woman from Tokyo" – 6:29
2. "Ted the Mechanic" (Gillan, Morse, Glover, Lord, Paice) – 4:49
3. "Mary Long" – 5:36
4. "Lazy" – 6:11
5. "No One Came" – 5:57
6. "Black Night" – 8:25
7. "Sometimes I Feel Like Screaming" (Gillan, Morse, Glover, Lord, Paice) – 7:20
8. "Fools" – 11:06
9. "Perfect Strangers" – 10:08

==== Disc two ====
10. "Hey Cisco" (Gillan, Morse, Glover, Lord, Paice) – 6:47
11. "When a Blind Man Cries" – 7:32
12. "Smoke on the Water" – 10:11
13. "Speed King" – 16:14
14. "Hush" (South) – 4:21
15. "Highway Star" – 7:33
- Recorded on 20 March at Hong Kong Coliseum

=== Tokyo 24 March 2001 ===
==== Disc one ====
1. "Pictured Within" (Lord) – 11:04
2. "Sitting in a Dream" (Glover) – 4:45
3. "Love is All" (Glover, Eddie Hardin) – 4:30
4. "Fever Dreams" (Ronnie James Dio) – 4:18
5. "Rainbow in the Dark" (Dio, Vivian Campbell, Jimmy Bain, Vinny Appice) – 5:57
6. "Watching the Sky" (Gillan, Morse, Glover, Lord, Paice) – 5:27
7. "Sometimes I Feel Like Screaming" (Gillan, Morse, Glover, Lord, Paice) – 7:20
8. "The Well-Dressed Guitar" (Morse) – 4:07
9. "Wring That Neck" (Blackmore, Nick Simper, Lord, Paice) – 5:09
10. "Fools" – 9:54
11. "Perfect Strangers" (Gillan, Blackmore, Glover) – 6:23

==== Disc two ====
12. "Concerto Movement 1" (Lord) – 20:16
13. "Concerto Movement 2" (Lord) – 18:36
14. "Concerto Movement 3" (Lord) – 14:45
15. "When a Blind Man Cries" – 7:34
16. "Pictures of Home" – 10:06
17. "Smoke on the Water" – 7:04
- Recorded on 24 March in Tokyo
- Featuring Ronnie James Dio (vocals) on tracks 2, 3, 4 & 5 (disc one) and track 6 (disc two)

=== Tokyo 25 March 2001 ===
==== Disc one ====
1. "Pictured Within" (Lord) – 11:24
2. "Sitting in a Dream" (Glover) – 4:22
3. "Love is All" (Glover, Hardin) – 4:19
4. "Fever Dreams" (Dio) – 4:52
5. "Rainbow in the Dark" (Dio, Campbell, Bain, Appice) – 5:10
6. "Sometimes I Feel Like Screaming" (Gillan, Morse, Glover, Lord, Paice) – 7:12
7. "The Well-Dressed Guitar" (Morse) – 3:19
8. "Wring That Neck" (Blackmore, Simper, Lord, Paice) – 5:58
9. "When a Blind Man Cries" – 7:42
10. "Fools" – 10:12
11. "Perfect Strangers" (Gillan, Blackmore, Glover) – 6:39

==== Disc two ====
12. "Concerto Movement 1" (Lord) – 19:30
13. "Concerto Movement 2" (Lord) – 19:16
14. "Concerto Movement 3" (Lord) – 14:44
15. "Pictures of Home" – 10:28
16. "Smoke on the Water" – 11:40
- Recorded on 25 March in Tokyo
- Featuring Ronnie James Dio (vocals) on tracks 2, 3, 4 & 5 (disc one) and track 5 (disc two)
