= In Concert with The London Symphony Orchestra =

1999 live album by Deep Purple

Live album by Deep Purple
- Released: 8 February 2000
- Recorded: 25–26 September 1999
- Venue: Royal Albert Hall, London
- Studio: The Manor Mobile
- Genre: Classical crossover, progressive rock, symphonic rock, hard rock
- Length: 127:22
- Label: Eagle
- Producer: Deep Purple

Deep Purple live albums chronology
Total Abandon: Australia '99 (1999)	In Concert with The London Symphony Orchestra (2000)	Live at the Rotterdam Ahoy (2001)

In Concert with the London Symphony Orchestra

Video by Deep Purple
- Released: 25 July 2000
- Recorded: 25–26 September 1999
- Venue: Royal Albert Hall, London
- Genre: Classical crossover, progressive rock, symphonic rock, hard rock
- Length: 120 min.
- Label: Eagle Vision
- Director: Anthony Powell
- Producer: Geoff Foulkes, Terry Shand, Geoff Kempin

Deep Purple video chronology
Total Abandon: Australia '99 (1999)	In Concert with the London Symphony Orchestra (2000)	New, Live & Rare (2000)

Professional ratings
Review scores
Source	Rating
AllMusic	3/5 stars
Collector's Guide to Heavy Metal	5/10

In Concert with The London Symphony Orchestra (also cited as In Concert with The London Symphony Orchestra Conducted by Paul Mann) is a live album and DVD by the English hard rock band Deep Purple, recorded on 25–26 September 1999 at the Royal Albert Hall in London with the London Symphony Orchestra, and released on 8 February 2000 on Eagle Records.

The album was a project started in 1999 by keyboardist Jon Lord, who sought to recreate the band's innovative 1969 album, Concerto for Group and Orchestra, of which the original score was lost. With the help of Marco de Goeij, a fan who was also a musicologist and composer, the two painstakingly recreated the lost score, and Lord elected to have the band perform it once more at the Royal Albert Hall, but this time with the London Symphony Orchestra rather than the Royal Philharmonic Orchestra, and with Paul Mann as conductor rather than Malcolm Arnold. The concert also featured songs from each member's solo careers, as well as a short Deep Purple set, and guest musicians such as Ronnie James Dio, the Steve Morse Band, and Sam Brown. In early 2001, two similar concerts were also performed in Tokyo, and were released as part of the Soundboard Series box set.

== Track listings ==
Disc one
No.	Title	Writer(s)	Originally released in	Length
1.	"Pictured Within"	Jon Lord	Pictured Within (1998)	8:38
2.	"Wait a While"	Lord, Sam Brown	Pictured Within	6:44
3.	"Sitting in a Dream"	Roger Glover	The Butterfly Ball and the Grasshopper's Feast (1974)	4:01
4.	"Love Is All"	Glover, Eddie Hardin	The Butterfly Ball and the Grasshopper's Feast	4:40
5.	"Via Miami"	Ian Gillan, Glover	Accidentally on Purpose (1988)	4:51
6.	"That's Why God Is Singing the Blues"	Dave Corbett	Dreamcatcher (1997)	4:02
7.	"Take It Off the Top"	Steve Morse	What If (1978)	4:43
8.	"Wring That Neck"	Ritchie Blackmore, Nick Simper, Lord, Ian Paice	The Book of Taliesyn (1968)	4:38
9.	"Pictures of Home"	Gillan, Blackmore, Glover, Lord, Paice	Machine Head (1972)	9:56

Disc two
No.	Title	Writer(s)	Originally released in	Length
10.	"Concerto for Group and Orchestra, Mov. 1"	Lord	Concerto for Group and Orchestra (1969)	17:03
11.	"Concerto for Group and Orchestra, Mov. 2"	Gillan, Lord	Concerto for Group and Orchestra	19:43
12.	"Concerto for Group and Orchestra, Mov. 3"	Lord	Concerto for Group and Orchestra	13:28
13.	"Ted the Mechanic"	Gillan, Morse, Glover, Lord, Paice	Purpendicular (1996)	4:50
14.	"Watching the Sky"	Gillan, Morse, Glover, Lord, Paice	Abandon (1998)	5:38
15.	"Sometimes I Feel Like Screaming"	Gillan, Morse, Glover, Lord, Paice	Purpendicular	7:44
16.	"Smoke on the Water"	Gillan, Blackmore, Glover, Lord, Paice	Machine Head	6:43

=== Single disc version ===
Released in 1999.

1. "Concerto for Group and Orchestra, Mov. 1" – 17:03
2. "Concerto for Group and Orchestra, Mov. 2" – 19:43
3. "Concerto for Group and Orchestra, Mov. 3" – 13:28
4. "Wring That Neck" – 4:38
5. "Pictures of Home" – 9:56
6. "Smoke on the Water" – 6:43

=== DVD ===
1. "Pictured Within"
2. "Wait a While"
3. "Sitting in a Dream"
4. "Love Is All"
5. "Wring That Neck"
6. "Concerto for Group and Orchestra, Movement I"
7. "Concerto for Group and Orchestra, Movement II"
8. "Concerto for Group and Orchestra, Movement III"
9. "Ted the Mechanic"
10. "Watching the Sky"
11. "Sometimes I Feel Like Screaming"
12. "Pictures of Home"
13. "Smoke on the Water"

== Personnel ==
Deep Purple

- Ian Gillan – vocals
- Steve Morse – guitars
- Jon Lord – keyboards
- Roger Glover – bass
- Ian Paice – drums

The London Symphony Orchestra

- Paul Mann – conductor

Additional musicians

- Ronnie James Dio – lead vocals on "Sitting in a Dream", "Love Is All"
- Aitch McRobbie, Margo Buchanan, Pete Brown – backing vocals
- Mario Argandoña – vocals, percussion
- Sam Brown – backing vocals, lead vocals on "Wait a While"
- Miller Anderson – lead vocals on "Pictured Within"
- Graham Preskett – violin on "Love Is All"
- Steve Morris – guitars on "That's Why God Is Singing the Blues"
- Eddie Hardin – piano on "Love Is All"
- Annie Whitehead – trombone
- Paul Spong – trumpet, flugelhorn
- Roddy Lorimer – trumpet, flugelhorn
- Simon C. Clarke – baritone, alto sax, flute
- Tim Sanders – tenor sax, soprano sax
- Dave LaRue – bass
- Van Romaine – drums

Production

- Recorded with The Manor Mobile
- Shaun Defeo, Will Shapland – engineers, mixing at Real World Studios, Box, Wiltshire, England
- Alex Goodison – assistant engineer

== Charts ==
Chart (1998)	Peak position
German Albums Chart	32
Swiss Albums Chart	65
Dutch Albums Chart	86
UK Albums Chart	101
