= Hard Lovin' Man =

Song by Deep Purple

from the album Deep Purple in Rock
- Released: 5 June 1970
- Recorded: January – April 1970
- Studio: De Lane Lea (London)
- Genre: Heavy metal, proto-thrash
- Length: 7:11
- Label: Harvest; Warner Bros. (US & Canada)
- Songwriters: Ritchie Blackmore; Ian Gillan; Roger Glover; Jon Lord; Ian Paice
- Producer: Deep Purple

"Hard Lovin' Man" is a song by the English rock band Deep Purple, released on their 1970 album Deep Purple in Rock. Developed from a bass riff by Roger Glover, the song is considered ground-breaking for its aggressive guitar riffs, and is cited as one of the earliest influences in the development of heavy metal.

== Overview ==
"Hard Lovin' Man" was derived from a bass riff composed by bassist Roger Glover, and developed as a jam session by the rest of the band. The song's authorship has been credited to all of the band members. It was the first song to be recorded by the band at De Lane Lea in January 1970 with engineer Martin Birch during the In Rock recording sessions, and is dedicated to him. The song contains an extended organ solo played by Jon Lord, followed by an extensive guitar solo played by Ritchie Blackmore. It ends with a loud and complex instrumental jam.

The song is generally considered one of the heaviest songs recorded by Deep Purple, notable for its highly distorted guitar tone and rapid guitar picking. It is cited as containing arguably the earliest example of a heavy metal gallop. In 2015, Goldmine magazine stated that the song "invents the heavy metal gallop, simultaneously taking the staccato "machine gun" riff far beyond what Jimmy Page had imagined through "Communication Breakdown"." Furthermore, the guitar picking techniques and aggressive musicianship found in the song have been described as some of the earliest examples of the characteristics that would later define the genres of thrash and speed metal. Music journalist Martin Popoff described the song as "a great contender for first proto-thrash song ever", predating Queen's "Stone Cold Crazy" by four years.

== Personnel ==
Deep Purple

- Ian Gillan – vocals
- Ritchie Blackmore – guitars
- Roger Glover – bass guitar
- Jon Lord – organ
- Ian Paice – drums

Technical personnel

- Deep Purple – production
- Martin Birch – engineer
