= Live in Montreux 69 =

Live album by Deep Purple
- Released: 28 August 2006
- Recorded: 4 October 1969; Montreux, Switzerland
- Genres: Hard rock Heavy metal
- Length: 90:01 (2CD)
- Label: Sonic Zoom PUR 257D
- Producer: Deep Purple

Deep Purple live albums chronology
| Live at Montreux 1996 (2006) | Live in Montreux 69 (2006) | Live in Denmark 1972 (2007) |

Live in Montreux 69 is a live album by English rock band Deep Purple, recorded 4 October 1969 in Montreux, released in 2006. It was recorded in the Montreux Casino that burned down two years later.

It featured some of the first performances of "Speed King" and "Child in Time", which were released on Deep Purple in Rock eight months later. The live version of "Kentucky Woman" is the only known surviving recording of the song with Ian Gillan and Roger Glover.

Live in Montreux 69 was first issued as a limited edition digipak (Sonic Zoom PUR 207D) under the title Kneel & Pray in 2004.

== Track listing ==
All songs written by Ritchie Blackmore, Ian Gillan, Roger Glover, Jon Lord and Ian Paice except where indicated.

Disc one
| No. | Title | Length |
|---|---|---|
| 1. | "Speed King/Kneel & Pray" | 6:02 |
| 2. | "Hush" (Joe South) | 6:20 |
| 3. | "Child in Time" | 12:38 |
| 4. | "Wring That Neck" (Blackmore, Nick Simper, Lord, Paice) | 20:30 |

Disc two
| No. | Title | Length |
|---|---|---|
| 1. | "Paint It Black" (Mick Jagger, Keith Richards) | 14:48 |
| 2. | "Mandrake Root" (Rod Evans, Blackmore, Lord) | 25:08 |
| 3. | "Kentucky Woman" (Neil Diamond) | 6:00 |

== Personnel ==
- Ritchie Blackmore – guitars
- Ian Gillan – vocals, percussion
- Roger Glover – bass
- Jon Lord – organ
- Ian Paice – drums, percussion
