= Any fule kno =

"As any fule kno" (a misspelling of "as any fool knows") is the catchphrase of the fictional schoolboy Nigel Molesworth. It may also refer to:

- Any Fule Kno That, a 1998 album track by Deep Purple.
