= Live at the Rotterdam Ahoy =

Live album by Deep Purple
- Released: 2001
- Recorded: Rotterdam Ahoy, Rotterdam, Netherlands, 30 October 2000
- Genre: Hard rock, symphonic rock
- Length: 111:09
- Label: Thames Thompson
- Producer: Drew Thompson

Deep Purple live albums chronology
In Concert with The London Symphony Orchestra (2000)	Live at the Rotterdam Ahoy (2001)	This Time Around: Live in Tokyo (2001)

Live at the Rotterdam Ahoy is a live album recorded by Deep Purple on 30 October 2000 and released in 2001. It includes most of a concert performed in Rotterdam, the Netherlands during the 2000/2001 "Concerto Tour". The Concerto for Group and Orchestra itself was performed, but it does not appear on the album due to "legal requirements" (according to the liner notes). Some tracks are solo compositions by members of the band, two are songs originally recorded by guest Ronnie James Dio, and the remainder are a mix of new and old Deep Purple songs.

== Track listing ==
Disc 1
No.	Title	Length
1.	"Introduction"	2:06
2.	"Pictured Within" (Jon Lord)	9:26
3.	"Sitting in a Dream" (Roger Glover)	4:18
4.	"Love is All" (Glover, Eddie Hardin)	4:16
5.	"Fever Dreams" (Ronnie James Dio)	4:23
6.	"Rainbow in the Dark" (Dio, Vivian Campbell, Jimmy Bain, Vinny Appice)	4:49
7.	"Wring That Neck" (Ritchie Blackmore, Nick Simper, Lord, Ian Paice)	6:01
8.	"Fools" (Ian Gillan, Blackmore, Glover, Lord, Paice)	10:04
9.	"When a Blind Man Cries" (Gillan, Blackmore, Glover, Lord, Paice)	7:43
10.	"Vavoom: Ted the Mechanic" (Gillan, Steve Morse, Glover, Lord, Paice)	5:13
11.	"The Well-Dressed Guitar" (Morse)	3:31

Disc 2
No.	Title	Length
1.	"Pictures of Home" (Gillan, Blackmore, Glover, Lord, Paice)	10:11
2.	"Sometimes I Feel Like Screaming" (Gillan, Morse, Glover, Lord, Paice)	7:26
3.	"Perfect Strangers" (Gillan, Blackmore, Glover)	7:37
4.	"Riff Raff"/"Smoke on the Water" (Gillan, Blackmore, Glover, Lord, Paice)	10:20
5.	"Black Night" (Gillan, Blackmore, Glover, Lord, Paice)	6:27
6.	"Highway Star" (Gillan, Blackmore, Glover, Lord, Paice)	7:18

== Personnel ==
- Ian Gillan - lead vocals
- Steve Morse - guitar
- Roger Glover - bass guitar
- Ian Paice - drums
- Jon Lord - keyboards

Additional personnel

- Ronnie James Dio - vocals (tracks 3, 4, 5 & 6 on disc one, track 4 on disc two)
- Miller Anderson - vocals, guitar
- "The Backstreet Dolls" - backing vocals
- "The Rip Horns" - horn section
- The Romanian Philharmonic Orchestra conducted by Paul Mann
