= Live in Denmark 1972 =

Live album

Live album by Deep Purple
- Released: December 2002
- Recorded: 1 March 1972; K.B. Hallen, Copenhagen, Denmark
- Genres: Hard rock, heavy metal
- Length: 97:17 (2CD 2002/2007) 122:41 (2CD 2013)
- Label: Sonic Zoom PUR 253D
- Producer: Deep Purple

Deep Purple live albums chronology
Live in Montreux 69 (2006)	Live in Denmark 1972 (2002)	Live at Montreux 2006: They All Came Down to Montreux (2007)

Live in Denmark 1972 is a live album by English hard rock band Deep Purple, recorded 1 March 1972 at the K.B. Hallen in Copenhagen, Denmark, first released in 2002.

The video of the concert was included on the Live in Concert 1972/73 DVD in 2005.

This is one of five Deep Purple concerts released from the tours in 1972, and the only one to feature "Fireball", which was substituted with "Smoke on the Water" one week later (see Deep Purple in Concert).

== Track listing ==
All songs written by Ritchie Blackmore, Ian Gillan, Roger Glover, Jon Lord and Ian Paice except where indicated.

=== Live in Denmark '72 (2002) and Live in Denmark 1972 – Official Archive Collection (2007) ===
Disc one
No.	Title	Length
1.	"Highway Star"	8:30
2.	"Strange Kind of Woman"	10:10
3.	"Child in Time"	17:29
4.	"The Mule"	9:15

Disc two
No.	Title	Length
1.	"Lazy"	11:56
2.	"Space Truckin'"	23:48
3.	"Fireball"	4:07
4.	"Lucille" (Al Collins, Richard Penniman)	5:54
5.	"Black Night"	6:19

=== Live in Copenhagen 1972 (2013 Deep Purple (Overseas) Live Series) ===
Disc one
No.	Title	Length
1.	"Highway Star"	8:25
2.	"Strange Kind of Woman"	9:33
3.	"Child in Time"	17:26
4.	"The Mule"	9:23
5.	"Lazy"	11:16
6.	"Space Truckin'"	22:10
Total length:		78:13

Disc two
No.	Title	Length
1.	"Fireball"	5:11
2.	"Lucille" (Al Collins, Richard Penniman)	5:55
3.	"Black Night"	6:15
4.	"Strange Kind of Woman (Live New York May 1973)"	5:18
5.	"Smoke on the Water (Live New York May 1973)"	5:24
6.	"Space Truckin' (Live New York May 1973)"	10:41
7.	"1971 Australian Interview"	5:44
Total length:		44:28

Total length of the Copenhagen 1972 show: 95:34 (= 78:13 + 17:21)

== Personnel ==
- Ritchie Blackmore – guitars
- Ian Gillan – vocals, harmonica, percussion
- Roger Glover – bass
- Jon Lord – organ, keyboards
- Ian Paice – drums, percussion

== Charts ==
=== Re-release ===
Year	Chart	Position
2013	Belgium (Wa)	132
2013	Belgium (Vl)	184
