= Total Abandon: Australia '99 =

1999 live album by Deep Purple

Live album by Deep Purple
- Released: September 1999
- Recorded: 20 April 1999
- Venue: Melbourne Park, Melbourne, Australia
- Genre: Hard rock, heavy metal
- Length: 116:07
- Label: EMI/Thames Talent (Australia/Europe); Eagle (US)
- Producer: Deep Purple

Deep Purple live albums chronology
Live at The Olympia '96 (1997)	Total Abandon: Australia '99 (1999)	In Concert with The London Symphony Orchestra (2000)

Total Abandon: Australia '99

Video by Deep Purple
- Released: 1999
- Recorded: 20 April 1999
- Venue: Melbourne Park, Melbourne, Australia
- Genre: Hard rock, heavy metal
- Length: 3 hours, 20 minutes
- Label: Eagle Rock Entertainment
- Director: Henk Eykman
- Producer: Darren Schneider, Drew Thompson

Deep Purple chronology
Live at Montreux 1996 (1996)	Total Abandon: Australia '99 (1999)	In Concert with The London Symphony Orchestra (2000)

Professional ratings
Review scores
Source	Rating
AllMusic	3.5/5 stars
AllMusic	(DVD)
Goldmine	5/5 stars
PopMatters	6/10 stars

Total Abandon: Australia '99 is a double live album and DVD by English hard rock band Deep Purple, recorded at Melbourne Park in Melbourne, Australia on 20 April 1999. When the album was released in September 1999, it was only available in Australia. From 12 October 1999, it was made available as mail-order merchandise in Europe. Later, it was also sold in music stores. In the USA, the album was not released until 2012; this edition was cut to only one disc.

The album was accompanied in Australia by two collector edition singles: "Smoke on the Water" with a disc cut into the shape of the Australian continent, and "Black Night", which disc was manufactured in the shape of the DP logo.

The VHS/DVD was originally available only in Australia and as mail-order merchandise. It was released in the US on 16 May 2000. It was re-released in Europe in 2003 with an additional documentary, A Band Down Under, which previously had been released only on VHS. The 1999 DVD edition of the album went platinum in Australia becoming Deep Purple's commercially most successful DVD/video release in that country.

== Track listings ==
=== 1999 edition ===
All songs written by Ritchie Blackmore, Ian Gillan, Roger Glover, Jon Lord, and Ian Paice except where noted.

CD one

1. "Ted the Mechanic" (Gillan, Steve Morse, Glover, Lord, Paice) – 4:50
2. "Strange Kind of Woman" – 6:23
3. "Bloodsucker" – 4:56
4. "Pictures of Home" – 8:19
5. "Almost Human" (Gillan, Morse, Glover, Lord, Paice) – 6:16
6. "Woman from Tokyo" – 6:47
7. "Watching the Sky" (Gillan, Morse, Glover, Lord, Paice) – 5:46
8. "Fireball" – 4:44
9. "Sometimes I Feel Like Screaming" (Gillan, Morse, Glover, Lord, Paice) – 7:11
10. "Steve Morse Guitar Solo" (Morse) – 8:42
11. "Smoke on the Water" – 9:01 – includes riffs from following songs in the beginning (unlisted):
  1. "Heartbreaker" (John Bonham, John Paul Jones, Jimmy Page, Robert Plant)
  2. "Whole Lotta Love" (Bonham, Willie Dixon, Jones, Page, Plant)
  3. "Fire" (Jimi Hendrix)
  4. "Crossroads" (Robert Johnson)
  5. "Day Tripper" (Lennon–McCartney)
  6. "You Really Got Me" (Ray Davies)

CD two

12. "Lazy" – 8:49
13. "Perfect Strangers" (Gillan, Blackmore, Glover) – 6:18
14. "Speed King" – 14:28
15. "Black Night" – 6:21
16. "Highway Star" – 7:16

=== 2012 edition ===
1. "Ted the Mechanic" – 4:50
2. "Strange Kind of Woman" – 6:23
3. "Bloodsucker" – 4:56
4. "Pictures of Home" – 8:19
5. "Almost Human" – 6:16
6. "Woman from Tokyo" – 6:47
7. "Watching the Sky" – 5:46
8. "Fireball" – 4:44
9. "Sometimes I Feel Like Screaming" – 7:11
10. "Smoke on the Water" – 9:01
11. "Black Night" – 6:21
12. "Highway Star" – 7:16

== DVD track listing ==
1. "Intro"
2. "Ted the Mechanic" – 4:34
3. "Strange Kind of Woman" – 6:21
4. "Bloodsucker" – 4:57
5. "Pictures of Home" – 8:18
6. "Almost Human" – 6:32
7. "Woman from Tokyo" – 6:25
8. "Watching the Sky" – 5:42
9. "Fireball" – 4:45
10. "Sometimes I Feel Like Screaming" – 7:05
11. "Steve Morse Guitar Solo" – 11:37
12. "Smoke on the Water" – 5:57
13. "Lazy" – 8:50
14. "Perfect Strangers" – 6:19
15. "Speed King" – 15:14
16. "Black Night" – 6:17
17. "Highway Star" – 8:05

== Limited edition singles ==
- "Smoke on the Water" (radio mix) / "Smoke on the Water" (enhanced video) (1999)
- "Black Night" / "Fireball" (1999)

== Personnel ==
Deep Purple

- Ian Gillan – vocals
- Steve Morse – guitars
- Jon Lord – keyboards
- Roger Glover – bass guitar
- Ian Paice – drums

Production

- Darren Schneider – production
- Drew Thompson – executive production
- Mat Gearing Thomas – mixing

== Certifications ==
Video certifications for Total Abandon: Australia '99
Region	Certification	Certified units/sales
Australia (ARIA)	Platinum	15,000^{^}
^{^} Shipments figures based on certification alone.
