= Live in London (Deep Purple album) =

Live album by Deep Purple
- Released: 23 August 1982
- Recorded: 22 May 1974
- Venues: Gaumont State Theatre, Kilburn, London
- Genres: Hard rock, heavy metal
- Length: 57:25
- Label: Harvest
- Producer: Deep Purple

Deep Purple live albums chronology
Deep Purple in Concert (1980)	Live in London (1982)	Nobody's Perfect (1988)

Professional ratings
Review scores
Source	Rating
AllMusic	4/5 stars
Play.com	5/5 stars

Live in London is a live album from Deep Purple. It was recorded on 22 May 1974 at Gaumont State Theatre in Kilburn, London by the BBC for radio broadcast, but was unreleased on vinyl until 1982. It features the Mk 3 lineup of Blackmore/Coverdale/Hughes/Lord/Paice during the tour for their album Burn.

At one point during the album, keyboardist Jon Lord jokingly refers to himself as "Rick Emerson" while introducing the band. This is a combination of the first and last name of the keyboardists for progressive rock bands Yes and Emerson, Lake, and Palmer, which are Rick Wakeman and Keith Emerson, respectively.

== Track listing ==
All songs written by Ritchie Blackmore, David Coverdale, Glenn Hughes*, Jon Lord and Ian Paice, except where indicated. (*) Glenn Hughes is credited on the 2007 release.

Original release
No.	Title	Length
1.	"Burn"	6:58
2.	"Might Just Take Your Life"	4:51
3.	"Lay Down, Stay Down"	5:11
4.	"Mistreated" (Blackmore, Coverdale)	11:34
5.	"Smoke on the Water" (Blackmore, Ian Gillan, Roger Glover, Lord, Paice)	10:33
6.	"You Fool No One"	18:14

=== The 2003 CD Reissue ===
The reissued CD edition was released by Purple Records on 30 December 2003 in Japan. This 2 CD reissue included the whole show, with the addition of previously unreleased 30-minute "Space Truckin'"

Disc one
No.	Title	Length
1.	"Burn"	6:58
2.	"Might Just Take Your Life"	4:51
3.	"Lay Down, Stay Down"	5:10
4.	"Mistreated"	13:18
5.	"Smoke on the Water"	8:46
6.	"You Fool No One"	18:18

Disc two
No.	Title	Length
1.	"Space Truckin'"	31:16

=== The 2007 2CD Remaster ===
The remastered CD edition with the whole show was released by EMI on 3 September 2007 in Europe and some other markets. There is no word yet on an American release.

Disc one
No.	Title	Length
1.	"Burn"	7:46
2.	"Might Just Take Your Life"	5:17
3.	"Lay Down, Stay Down"	5:29
4.	"Mistreated"	15:28
5.	"Smoke on the Water"	9:14

Disc two
No.	Title	Length
1.	"You Fool No One"	20:23
2.	"Space Truckin'" (Blackmore, Gillan, Glover, Lord, Paice)	31:03

== Personnel ==
Deep Purple

- Ritchie Blackmore – guitars
- David Coverdale – lead vocals
- Glenn Hughes – bass, vocals
- Jon Lord – keyboards
- Ian Paice – drums

Additional personnel

- Martin Birch – Engineer
- Peter Mew – Original album remastering

== Charts ==
Chart (1982)	Peak position
Japanese Albums (Oricon)	74
UK Albums (Official Charts)	23

Chart (2007)	Peak position
Austrian Albums (Ö3 Austria)	74
French Albums (SNEP)	182
