= Speed metal =

Subgenre of heavy metal music

- Stylistic origins: New wave of British heavy metal; heavy metal; punk
- Cultural origins: Late 1970s and early 1980s, mainly in the United Kingdom
- Derivative forms: Neoclassical metal; power metal; thrash metal; black metal

Other topics
- Extreme metal; shred guitar

Speed metal is a subgenre of heavy metal music that originated in the late 1970s from new wave of British heavy metal (NWOBHM) roots. It is described by AllMusic as "extremely fast, abrasive, and technically demanding" music.

It is usually considered less abrasive and more melodic than thrash metal. However, speed metal is usually faster and more aggressive than traditional heavy metal, also showing more inclination to virtuoso soloing and featuring short instrumental passages between couplets. Speed metal songs frequently make use of highly expressive vocals, but are usually less likely to employ "harsh" vocals than thrash metal songs.

== Origins ==
=== New wave of British heavy metal ===
One of the key influences on the development of speed metal was the new wave of British heavy metal, or NWOBHM. This was a heavy metal movement that started in the late 1970s in Britain and achieved international attention by the early 1980s. NWOBHM bands toned down the blues influences of earlier acts, incorporated elements of punk, increased the tempo, and adopted a "tougher" sound, taking a harder approach to their music.

It was an era directed almost exclusively at heavy metal fans and is considered to be a major foundation stone for the extreme metal genres.

The NWOBHM came to dominate the heavy metal scene of the early-mid-1980s. It was musically characterised by fast upbeat tempo songs, power chords, fast guitar solos and melodic, soaring vocals. Groups such as Iron Maiden, Judas Priest, Venom, Saxon and Motörhead as well as many lesser-known ones, became part of the canon that influenced American bands that formed in the early eighties.

=== Other metal influences ===
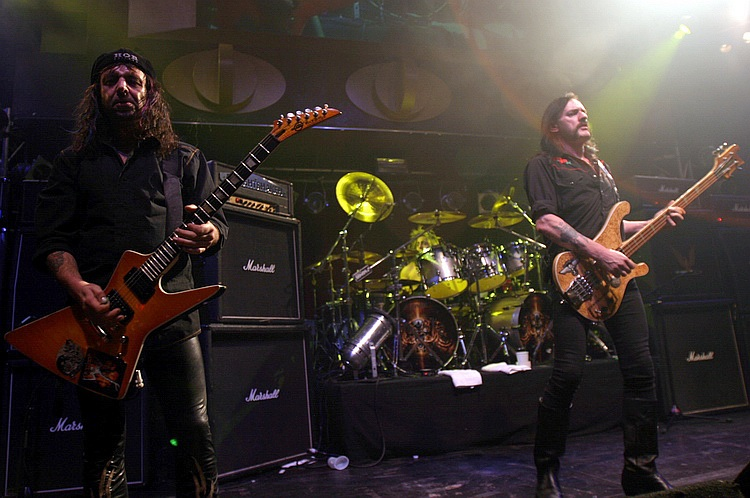
Motörhead playing in 2005

Motörhead is often credited as the first band to play speed metal in the mid-1970s. The Sweet released "Sweet F.A." and "Set Me Free" in April 1974 which heavily influenced speed metal later in the decade. Some of speed metal's earlier influences include Black Sabbath's "Children of the Grave" and "Symptom of the Universe", Budgie's "Breadfan", Kiss's "Parasite", and Queen's "Stone Cold Crazy" (Breadfan, and Stone Cold Crazy were eventually covered by the thrash metal band Metallica), as well as certain Deep Purple songs such as "Speed King", "Fireball" and "Highway Star". The latter was called "early speed metal" by Robb Reiner of speed metal band Anvil.

== History ==
The origin of the genre's name is the aptly named "Speed King" by Deep Purple. Recording on the song started in 1969 making it nearly a full decade ahead of the musical style being recognised. The song is not only very fast and technical but was also extremely loud creating noticeable distortion in the recording process. The title song for the band's next album, Fireball, is a further refinement of the band's influence with drummer Ian Paice's use of the double bass drum. The way the double bass drum is played in "Fireball"—uptempo "four on the floor"—became a mainstay in many heavy, speed and thrash metal songs in the years that followed.

Speed metal eventually evolved into thrash metal. Although many tend to equate the two subgenres, others argue that there is a distinct difference between them. In his book Sound of the Beast: The Complete Headbanging History of Heavy Metal, Ian Christe states that "...thrash metal relies more on long, wrenching rhythmic breaks, while speed metal... is a cleaner and more musically intricate subcategory, still loyal to the dueling melodies of classic metal." However, on the very next page, Christe calls speed metal a "subset of thrash metal" and argues that "There was little intrinsic difference between speed metal and thrash metal. With the sudden boom of fast, raging bands, however, it sometimes helped to distinguish between the throbbing, rhythm-heavy thrash metal and something a bit cleaner and more melodic--dubbed speed metal."

== Etymology ==
The term speed metal originated during the 1980s to refer to what is now known as thrash metal. The speed metal genre as it is understood today was defined retrospectively in the 1990s.

== Regional differences ==
Speed metal's sound varied between various regional scenes. European bands leaned towards the sound of bands like Venom and Motörhead. Japanese bands had a more melodic sound that resembled power metal. North American bands had a faster, more aggressive sound that would later influence the thrash metal movement.

== See also ==
- List of speed metal bands
- First-wave black metal – Early form of the black metal genre
