= Sometimes I Feel Like Screaming =

Single by Deep Purple

from the album Purpendicular
- Released: 1996
- Genre: Hard rock
- Songwriters: Ian Gillan, Roger Glover, Jon Lord, Steve Morse, Ian Paice
- Producer: Deep Purple

Deep Purple singles chronology
"Time to Kill"	"Sometimes I Feel Like Screaming"	"Any Fule Kno That"

"Sometimes I Feel Like Screaming" is a song on Purpendicular, Deep Purple's first studio album featuring guitarist Steve Morse, which was released in February 1996. The song was released as a CD single with the song "Vavoom: Ted the Mechanic".

Steve Morse remembered the creation process of the song: "'Sometimes I Feel Like Screaming' started as me noodling, playing quietly to myself. Roger and Jon heard what I was doing and said, 'What was that, again? Let's see if it'll work with this.' It became a song that day. Any idea could grow from a sprout into a tree".

"Sometimes I Feel Like Screaming" was one of the first songs that was recorded with Steve Morse on guitar. It includes a boasting melodic style and vocal outbursts by Ian Gillan and closes with a repeated guitar solo by Morse.

It was part of the following live albums of Deep Purple: Live at The Olympia '96 (1997), Total Abandon: Australia '99 (1999), In Concert with The London Symphony Orchestra (2000), The Soundboard Series (2001), Live at the Rotterdam Ahoy (2002), Live at Montreux 1996 (2006).

== Single ==
All songs written by Ian Gillan, Roger Glover, Jon Lord, Steve Morse, Ian Paice.

1. "Sometimes I Feel Like Screaming" (Edited version) – 4:35
2. "Vavoom: Ted the Mechanic" – 4:16
3. "Sometimes I Feel Like Screaming" – 7:29
