= Deep Purple in Rock =

Studio album by Deep Purple
- Released: 5 June 1970
- Recorded: October 1969 – March 1970
- Studios: IBC, De Lane Lea, and Abbey Road, London
- Genres: Hard rock; heavy metal
- Length: 43:29
- Labels: Harvest; Warner Bros. (US & Canada)
- Producer: Deep Purple

Deep Purple chronology
Concerto for Group and Orchestra (1969)	Deep Purple in Rock (1970)	Fireball (1971)

Singles from Deep Purple in Rock
- 1. "Speed King" Released: May 1970; 2. "Black Night" Released: June 1970

Deep Purple in Rock is the fourth studio album by English rock band Deep Purple, released on 5 June 1970. It was the first studio album recorded by the Mark II line-up of Ritchie Blackmore, Ian Gillan, Roger Glover, Jon Lord and Ian Paice.

Work on In Rock began shortly after Gillan and Glover joined the band in June 1969, with rehearsals at Hanwell Community Centre. The music was intended to be loud and heavy, and accurately represent the group's live show. Recording took place at various studios around London in between extensive touring, during which time songs and arrangements were honed into shape.

In Rock was the band's breakthrough album in Europe and peaked at No. 4 in the UK, remaining in the charts for over a year. By contrast, it underperformed in the United States, where the band's Mark I albums had been more successful. An accompanying single, "Black Night," reached No. 2 in the UK, becoming their highest-charting single there. The album has continued to attract critical praise as a key early example of the hard rock and heavy metal genres.

== Background ==
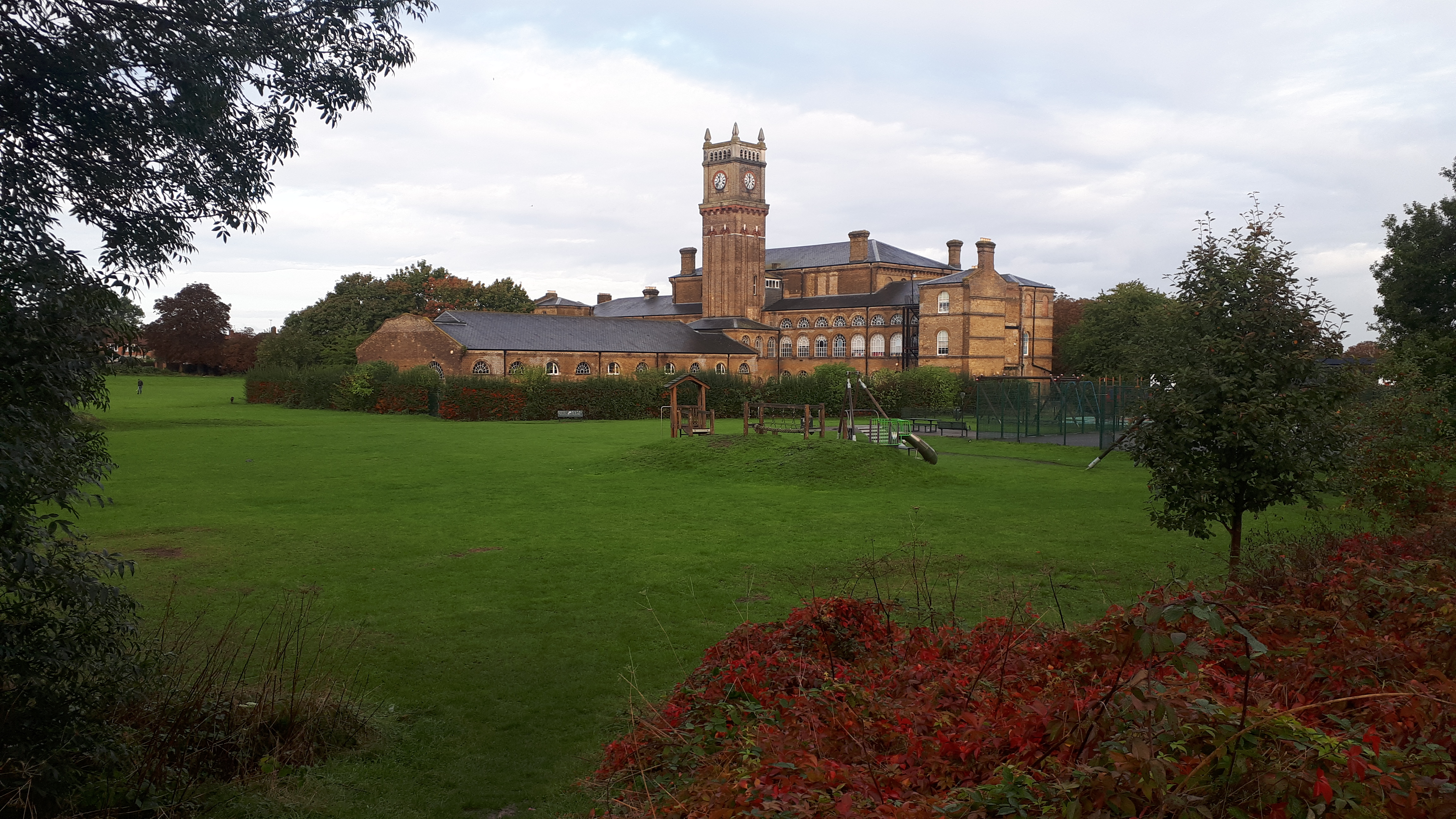
Material for the album was written and rehearsed at Hanwell Community Centre

By mid-1969, Deep Purple had recorded three albums, and achieved commercial success in the US, but suffered from a lack of musical direction. Although the group contained experienced musicians, none of the original members were accomplished songwriters, and their earlier work ranged from psychedelic hard rock based around guitarist Ritchie Blackmore's riffs, classical-influenced tracks developed and arranged by organist Jon Lord, and cover songs from the Beatles, Joe South, Neil Diamond and Donovan.

After a US tour in May, Blackmore, Lord and drummer Ian Paice decided to replace original lead singer Rod Evans with someone who could tackle a hard rock style. The group had also recently signed a deal with Harvest Records in the UK, who were intending to represent progressive and underground bands, but label owner Malcolm Jones thought Deep Purple relied too much on gimmicks and only appealed to the US market. Lord and Blackmore had met with Paice during the tour to discuss the personnel change, and Blackmore said he wanted to "have a go at being really heavy" after hearing Led Zeppelin's debut album. Blackmore asked his former bandmate, drummer Mick Underwood, to see if he knew a suitable singer. Underwood suggested his Episode Six bandmate Ian Gillan. Blackmore, Lord and Paice went to see an Episode Six gig in Woodford Green on 4 June, and after Blackmore sat in with the band, they offered Gillan the job.

Gillan and Episode Six bassist Roger Glover were friends and had formed a songwriting partnership. However, Glover did not want to leave Episode Six, so Gillan suggested he could help out with Deep Purple's songwriting as a compromise. On 7 June, Gillan and Glover were asked to play on a Deep Purple recording session for their next single, "Hallelujah", with Glover performing as a session musician. Afterwards, Glover changed his mind and decided to join the band.

The group initially met and developed song ideas in secrecy, not telling Evans or original bassist Nick Simper because the original lineup still had tour dates to promote the album The Book of Taliesyn, which Harvest had finally released in the UK (several months after its October 1968 US release). Furthermore, Episode Six's management did not want Gillan and Glover to quit the group, and they attempted to get a settlement from Deep Purple. However, after a few weeks, both Evans and Simper discovered they had been fired, and were unimpressed with the underhanded way it had been done, particularly recording with a different line-up. Underwood later said he regretted recommending Gillan to Deep Purple because he did not want Simper to lose his job. The final show with Evans and Simper was on 4 July, with the new lineup playing their first gig at The Speakeasy Club in London on 10 July. Gillan and Glover continued to play several more dates with Episode Six, the final show taking place on 26 July. They were replaced by John Gustafson as singer and bassist.

Hanwell Community Centre was booked for the band to rehearse and write new material; according to Glover, it was chosen because "it was the only place we could find where we could make a lot of noise". The basic structure of "Child in Time" was worked out at these sessions, and both it and "Speed King" (then titled "Kneel and Pray") were in the live set by the line-up's seventh gig at the Paradiso, Amsterdam, on 24 August. The Mk II lineup began to tour extensively, and found they had good musical chemistry together. Work on the new material was briefly interrupted by Lord's Concerto for Group and Orchestra, which featured Deep Purple playing with the Royal Philharmonic Orchestra at the Royal Albert Hall on 24 September. Though the concerto was a different style to the material worked on at Hanwell, it led to increased publicity in the UK, which along with the group's live act, started to give them a following.

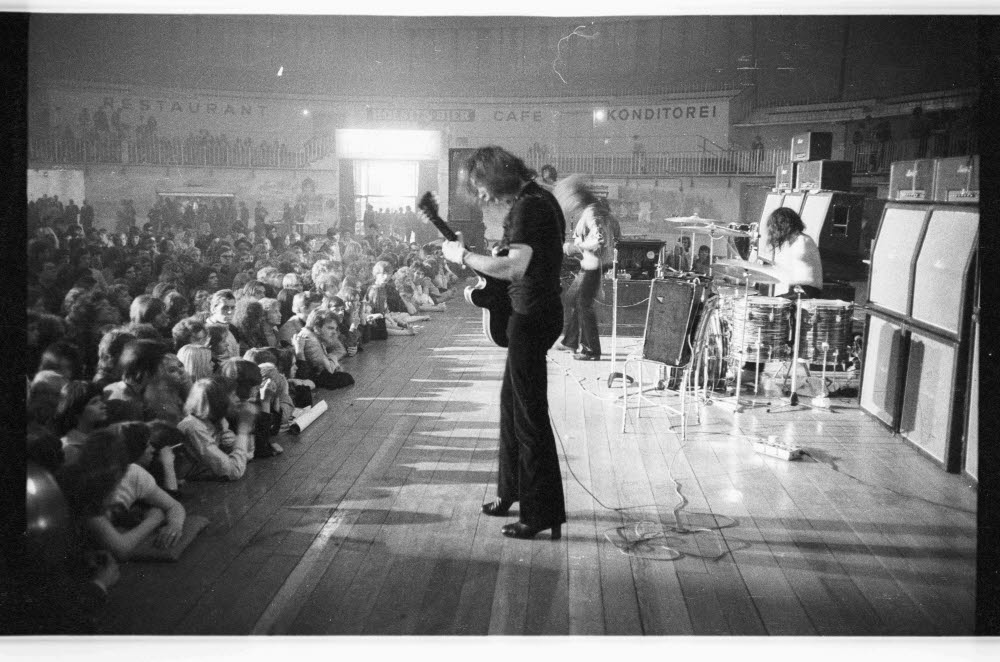
Deep Purple playing in Germany, May 1970

Recording on In Rock began at IBC Studios, London, with the first sessions in October. Studio work was spaced out between gigs, which were needed to provide the band with income, and continued intermittently until April the following year. Gillan later said that the regular gigging was important for material to be developed and to find the most suitable arrangements before recording. The basic ethos behind recording was that everything had to be loud and heavy; Glover recalled seeing VU meters in the red (signalling audio distortion) in the studio. In November 1969, the group played "Speed King" and "Living Wreck" for a BBC session, while in February 1970, the group performed a concert for the station, previewing some of the new live material. The band's US record company, Tetragrammaton, declared bankruptcy around this time, meaning an uncertainty of the album being released there. Warner Bros subsequently bought out the Tetragrammaton contract, and would release Deep Purple's albums in the US throughout the 1970s.

The album was the first one produced by the group, though they made prominent use of the engineers at the sessions, particularly Martin Birch who aimed to reproduce the live sound of the studio room on tape. The title was a reaction to Concerto for Group and Orchestra, emphasising that Deep Purple were a rock band. The cover was designed by the group's management; it depicts Mount Rushmore with photographs of the band's faces superimposed over the US presidents.

After recording had finished, the group continued touring. Gillan recalled playing 50 UK gigs in the first half of 1970, plus a further 15 in Europe. They also performed a live television special for Granada TV's Doing Their Thing and for London Weekend Television's South Bank Summer. On 9 August, the group appeared at the National Jazz and Blues Festival, which culminated in Blackmore setting fire to his amplifiers.

== Songs ==
Unlike earlier albums, every song on In Rock is credited to the five Deep Purple band members. Gillan recalled the songs were initially rehearsed at Hanwell, then introduced to the live show to see how they would work. Lord said the purpose of the album was to make "a conscious effort to stop and think about writing material we all understood".

=== Side one ===
"Speed King" developed from a bass riff written by Glover at Hanwell, in an attempt to emulate Jimi Hendrix's "Fire". Gillan wrote the lyrics by taking phrases of old rock 'n' roll songs by Little Richard. It was originally known as "Kneel and Pray" and developed as a live piece for several months before recording. The first studio take of the song featured Lord playing piano instead of organ, which was later released as a B-side in The Netherlands. The final take used on the album was recorded in January 1970; it opens with an untitled instrumental known as "Woffle", recorded in November 1969.

"Bloodsucker" was recorded at De Lane Lea Studios and finished at Abbey Road Studios. Paice enjoyed playing on the track. The song would be re-recorded 28 years later, with Steve Morse on guitar, and retitled "Bludsucker" for Deep Purple's 1998 album Abandon.

"Child in Time" was written early during the Hanwell rehearsals, after Lord began playing the introduction to "Bombay Calling" by It's a Beautiful Day. The group decided to play the song's main theme at a slower tempo, with Gillan writing new words inspired by war. (Note: In return, It's a Beautiful Day recorded the Deep Purple instrumental "Wring that Neck" almost note-for-note, and called it "Don and Dewey".) He later said he came up with the song's title spontaneously. The song was regularly played live, and was well-rehearsed by the time it was recorded at IBC in November 1969. It subsequently became a de facto anthem for anti-Communist resistance groups in Eastern Europe during the period of the Iron Curtain.

=== Side two ===
"Flight of the Rat" was the last song recorded for the album, at De Lane Lea on 11 March. It evolved during rehearsals from a humorous re-arrangement by Glover of "Flight of the Bumblebee".

"Into the Fire" was written by Glover as a warning against drugs. The main riff developed after discussing chromatic scales with Blackmore.

"Living Wreck" was recorded at the early IBC sessions in October 1969. It was almost left off the album as the group felt it was not good enough, but they listened to it again towards the end of the sessions and decided they liked it. Blackmore played the guitar solo through an octave pedal, while Lord's closing organ solo features the Leslie speaker pushed through Marshall Amplifiers.

"Hard Lovin' Man" was derived from a Glover bass riff and developed as a jam session by the rest of the band. It was the first track for the album recorded at De Lane Lea in January 1970 with engineer Martin Birch. The group were impressed with Birch's skills, and he was retained as engineer for the rest of the group's albums up to 1976. He was credited as a "catalyst" on the original LP.

=== Other songs ===
After completing the album, the group's management were worried there was no obvious hit single, and booked De Lane Lea in early May 1970 so the band could write and record one. After struggling to come up with a commercial-sounding song, Blackmore started playing the riff to Ricky Nelson's arrangement of "Summertime", while the group improvised the rest of the structure. Gillan later said he tried to write "the most banal lyrics we could think of". The result was the single "Black Night", which became the group's first UK hit.

"Cry Free" was recorded at IBC in January 1970. Although the group recorded over 30 takes, it did not make the final track listing, and was later released on a compilation album.

An instrumental, "Jam Stew" was recorded in late November 1969 at IBC. A version with improvised lyrics had been recorded as "John Stew" for a BBC session, while the main riff was featured on the track "Bullfrog" on the session album Green Bullfrog, released the following year.

== Release ==
The album and the single "Black Night" were both released on 5 June 1970. In Rock reached No. 4 in the UK and stayed in the album charts throughout the year and into the next, until the follow-up album Fireball was ready. The original release featured a gatefold sleeve with full lyrics, and a set of black and white photographs of the band.

The album was released in the United States in August 1970. The U.S. release of the album cut the intro to "Speed King", which lasts just over a minute. It remains edited on the standard Warner Bros. U.S. release, but was restored to full length on the 25th Anniversary package. The album was reissued in a single-sleeve vinyl in 1982, replacing the original gatefold sleeve. The Mexican release also included "Black Night" to the track listing.

The chart success of In Rock greatly raised Deep Purple's profile. In October, while touring the UK, Melody Maker ran a feature of "Purple Mania" showing the group's concerts were attracting increasingly enthusiastic crowds. The band finished the year touring Scandinavia and Germany. At a show at Lüdenscheid, they played without Blackmore who had taken ill. Fans started a riot and destroyed £2,000 worth of equipment.

=== Reissues ===
In 1995 a remastered and revised 25th anniversary edition of the album was released by EMI. The album was remastered by Glover, adding "Black Night", "Jam Stew", a new mix of "Cry Free", and remixes of "Flight of the Rat" and "Speed King".

In 2009 audiophile label Audio Fidelity released a remastered version of Deep Purple in Rock on a limited edition 24 karat gold CD. Mastering for the CD was performed by Steve Hoffman. This release follows the original seven-track format with no bonus tracks.

== Critical reception ==
Professional ratings
Review scores
Source	Rating
AllMusic	4.5/5 stars
Collector's Guide to Heavy Metal	10/10
Disc and Music Echo	4/5 stars
Encyclopedia of Popular Music	4/5 stars

Reaction to In Rock was positive. Record Mirror's Rodney Collins said it was "a stunningly good album" showing that "rock, given a fresh stab and alert material, is still one of the most rewarding areas of contemporary music." Richard Green, writing in New Musical Express, said the album was "Good, meaty rock all the way" and particularly praised Gillan's singing on "Child In Time". Disc and Music Echo rated it 4 stars out of 5, comparing the sound to the Nice, and noting Blackmore's instrumental dominance over Lord.

According to Tony Dolan in Deep Purple: a Critical Retrospective, the first Mk II album Concerto for Group and Orchestra had given Deep Purple much needed publicity in the UK, but the band – Ritchie Blackmore in particular – were determined that they "would not be labelled as a novelty act. He was adamant that the next studio album should be an all-out assault on the eardrums. As Blackmore said to others, 'if it’s not dramatic or exciting, it has no place on this album.' In Rock was everything Blackmore had envisaged and more. It would remain in the UK charts for over a year. Deep Purple had finally found its niche with its hard-driving, heavy, thunderous, powerful rock."

Retrospective reviews have been similarly favourable. AllMusic's Eduardo Rivadavia has called In Rock "one of heavy metal's defining albums". Rock journalist Malcolm Dome stated that "In Rock is one of the great albums... not just by Purple, by anybody." On new members Gillan and Glover, he added: "How Ian Gillan remains completely in control of his voice whilst going completely insane is remarkable. And Roger Glover was unfussy, but very good technically... also contributing nicely and impressively to songwriting." Sid Smith remarked in his BBC Music review the "strident confidence that the new line-up had found" and how the album "pretty much carved out the template for heavy rock." Canadian journalist Martin Popoff wrote that "Deep Purple's In rock, along with Sabbath's Paranoid and Heep's Uriah Heep, all in 1970, outright and triple-handedly invented Heavy Metal", with In Rock being "the flashiest, freshest and most sophisticated of the three." In his review, he reminded how the album remains "the sharpest, most insistently metallic Deep Purple record until Perfect Strangers" 14 years later, despite Deep Purple never accepting the title of heavy metal act, "fancying of themselves as a jazzy bluesy proggy hard rock band."

Blackmore has since said the album is his favourite during his time with Deep Purple, along with Machine Head.

== Track listing ==
All tracks are written by Ritchie Blackmore, Ian Gillan, Roger Glover, Jon Lord and Ian Paice.

Side one
No.	Title	Length
1.	"Speed King"	5:54
2.	"Bloodsucker"	4:16
3.	"Child in Time"	10:20

Side two
No.	Title	Length
4.	"Flight of the Rat"	7:57
5.	"Into the Fire"	3:30
6.	"Living Wreck"	4:34
7.	"Hard Lovin' Man"	7:11
Total length:		43:29

Note

- Some cassette releases had sides one and two switched, with the last four tracks on Side One and the first three on Side Two.

25th Anniversary Edition bonus tracks
No.	Title	Length
8.	"Black Night" (original single version)	3:28
9.	"Studio Chat (1)"	0:33
10.	"Speed King" (piano version)	4:14
11.	"Studio Chat (2)"	0:25
12.	"Cry Free" (Roger Glover remix)	3:20
13.	"Studio Chat (3)"	0:05
14.	"Jam Stew" (unreleased instrumental)	2:30
15.	"Studio Chat (4)"	0:40
16.	"Flight of the Rat" (Roger Glover remix)	7:53
17.	"Studio Chat (5)"	0:31
18.	"Speed King" (Roger Glover remix)	5:52
19.	"Studio Chat (6)"	0:23
20.	"Black Night" (unedited Roger Glover remix)	4:47

== Personnel ==
Deep Purple

- Ian Gillan – vocals
- Ritchie Blackmore – guitars
- Roger Glover – bass guitar
- Jon Lord – organ
- Ian Paice – drums

Technical personnel

- Deep Purple – production
- Andy Knight – engineer at IBC Studios ("Speed King", "Child in Time", "Into The Fire" & "Living Wreck")
- Martin Birch – engineer at De Lane Lea ("Flight of the Rat" & "Hard Lovin' Man")
- Phillip McDonald – engineer at Abbey Road Studios ("Bloodsucker")
- Edwards Coletta Productions – cover design
- Nesbit Phipps & Froome – art studios
- Mike Brown, Alan Hall – photography
- Mick (Egg) Angus, Ian (Bige) Hansford – equipment
- Peter Mew – original album remastering
- Roger Glover – oversaw the mixing of the extra tracks
- Tom Bender and Jason Butera – additional studio work

== Charts ==
=== Weekly charts ===
Chart (1970–1972)	Peak position
Australian Albums (Kent Music Report)	1
Finnish Albums (Suomen virallinen lista)	9
German Albums (Offizielle Top 100)	1
Italian Albums (Musica e Dischi)	19
Japanese Albums (Oricon)	68
Norwegian Albums (VG-lista)	5
UK Albums (Official Charts)	4
US Billboard 200	143

Chart (1975)	Peak position
Danish Albums (Hitlisten)	15

Chart (1995)	Peak position
UK Rock & Metal Albums (Official Charts)	16

Chart (2026)	Peak position
Croatian International Albums (HDU)	20

== Certifications and sales ==
Certifications and sales for Deep Purple in Rock
Region	Certification	Certified units/sales
Denmark (IFPI Danmark)	Gold	25,000
France (SNEP)	Gold	100,000^{*}
Germany (BVMI)	Gold	250,000^{^}
Italy (FIMI)	Gold	25,000^{‡}
Netherlands (NVPI)	Gold	50,000^{^}
Sweden	—	25,000
United Kingdom (BPI) original release	Gold	100,000^{^}
United Kingdom (BPI) sales since 1995	Gold	100,000^{*}
United States (RIAA)	Gold	500,000^{^}
^{*} Sales figures based on certification alone.^{^} Shipments figures based on certification alone.^{‡} Sales+streaming figures based on certification alone.

== Accolades ==
Accolades for Deep Purple in Rock
Publication	Country	Accolade	Year	Rank
Kerrang!	United Kingdom	"100 Greatest Heavy Metal Albums of All Time"	1989	15
Guitarist	United Kingdom	"Top 50 Most Influential Guitar Albums of All Time Ever"	1994	8
Q	United Kingdom	"50 Best Albums of The '70's"	1998	48
Kerrang!	United Kingdom	"100 Best British Rock Albums Ever"	2005	56
Classic Rock	United Kingdom	"100 Greatest British Rock Album Ever"	2006	13
1001 Albums You Must Hear Before You Die	United States	"1001 Albums You Must Hear Before You Die"	2006	*

(*) designates unordered lists.
