= Lazy (Deep Purple song) =

Single by Deep Purple

from the album Machine Head
- B-side: "When A Blind Man Cries"
- Released: June 1972 (US)
- Recorded: 6–21 December 1971; Montreux, Switzerland
- Genre: Blues rock; hard rock
- Length: 7:23 (album version); 2:40 (single version)
- Label: Warner Bros.
- Songwriters: Ian Gillan; Ritchie Blackmore; Roger Glover; Jon Lord; Ian Paice
- Producer: Deep Purple

"Lazy" is a song by Deep Purple from their 1972 album Machine Head. A live performance of the song can be found on the album Made in Japan, released later the same year.

The song starts out as an instrumental, keyboardist Jon Lord plays an overdriven Hammond organ intro, followed by the main riff and with the solo swapping between him and guitarist Ritchie Blackmore. Vocalist Ian Gillan comes in with the vocals later in the song. He also uses harmonica both on the studio version and live. At over 7 minutes, it is the longest track on the album, and live versions were often extended past 10 minutes.

The live version on Made in Japan features a theme from Hugo Alfvén's "Swedish Rhapsody #1", played by Ritchie Blackmore as a part of his solo. Additionally, Jon Lord includes the riff from the C Jam Blues in the intro. Ritchie Blackmore would sometimes include the main riff from "Lazy" in live performances of the song "Man on the Silver Mountain" by Rainbow. Gillan defined the song as rhythm and blues.

Later live performances after the band's reunion in 1984 tended to be much shorter, cutting out the intro and one of the verses. However, more recent performances with Steve Morse have gone back to the original arrangement. Other live versions can be found on Deep Purple in Concert, Nobody's Perfect and on videos like Live in Concert 72/73 and Total Abandon: Australia '99.

Readers of Guitar World voted "Lazy" the 74th greatest guitar solo of all time.

Sections of this song were often used in Australia on the Channel 9 Wide World of Sports program when cutting to an ad and used in Indonesia for opening song program Warna on the Trans7.

Jesse Gress, writing for Guitar Player magazine, noted that Ritchie Blackmore's "bluesy head to 'Lazy' (from Deep Purple's Machine Head) fondly paraphrases Slowhand’s [Clapton's] Bluesbreaker-era showcase 'Steppin' Out' right down to the same style of third-position swing-sixteenth G blues riffing".

== Personnel ==
- Ritchie Blackmore – guitars
- Ian Gillan – vocals, harmonica
- Roger Glover – bass
- Jon Lord – organ
- Ian Paice – drums
