= Fireball (album) =

Studio album by Deep Purple
- Released: July 1971 (US)
- Recorded: September 1970 – June 1971
- Studios: De Lane Lea and Olympic, London, The Hermitage, Welcombe, North Devon
- Genres: Hard rock; heavy metal
- Length: 40:34
- Labels: Harvest; Warner Bros. (US & Canada)
- Producer: Deep Purple

Deep Purple chronology
Deep Purple in Rock (1970)	Fireball (1971)	Machine Head (1972)

Singles from Fireball
- 1. "Strange Kind of Woman" Released: 12 February 1971; 2. "Fireball" Released: 29 October 1971

Alternative cover
- 25th Anniversary CD slipcase

Professional ratings
Review scores
Source	Rating
AllMusic	4.5/5 stars
Collector's Guide to Heavy Metal	9/10
The Encyclopedia of Popular Music	4/5 stars
Music Story	4.5/5 stars

Fireball is the fifth studio album by English rock band Deep Purple, released in the United States in July 1971 as the second album with the Mark II line-up, consisting of Jon Lord, Ritchie Blackmore, Ian Paice, Roger Glover and Ian Gillan. It was recorded at various times between September 1970 and June 1971.

The album was released in the United Kingdom on 3 September 1971 and became the first of the band's three UK No. 1 albums, though it did not stay on the charts as long as its predecessor, Deep Purple in Rock. Even though the album has sold over a million copies in the UK, it has never received a certification there.

== Background ==
The album was the first that Deep Purple worked on after reestablishing their career with In Rock, which had been a critical and commercial success, staying on the charts for over a year. Because of this, the group were in continual demand for live concerts, which began to affect band members' health. Keyboardist Jon Lord suffered back problems (dating back to his days in The Artwoods when he had to transport a Hammond organ to gigs without the assistance of a road crew), and bassist Roger Glover had stomach problems which prevented him from performing live on several occasions. Guitarist Ritchie Blackmore felt he had been vindicated by the decision to concentrate on hard rock, and believed the group's success was largely because of him. This led to increasing conflict with singer Ian Gillan and the relationship between the two began to become strained.

== Composition and recording ==
As with the previous album, sessions for the follow-up to In Rock were booked in the space of many months in between the band's touring commitments. On the first of these, in September 1970, the band completed just one song, "Anyone's Daughter", with the band struggling to come up with more ideas.

Further material for the album was rehearsed at Welcombe Manor, near Welcombe in Devon, in December 1970. The band cancelled several live performances in order to put together material that could serve as a follow-up to In Rock. "Strange Kind of Woman", "I'm Alone" and "The Mule" were written during these sessions, and recorded in January 1971, with the first two coupled together as Deep Purple's next single in February, to keep the band in the public eye while the album was still being worked on. Another song, "Freedom", was written at Welcombe and recorded during these sessions, but didn't make the final track listing. Other material was recorded on occasions in February and March between gigs. "Strange Kind of Woman" was added to the group's live set at the end of January, quickly developing into a showpiece for Gillan to sing back Blackmore's guitar riffs in a call and response manner. The last song to be recorded was "Demon's Eye" in June.

Meanwhile, their American record label, Warner Bros., grew impatient waiting for the new album, as the band had an American tour booked for July. As a result, "Demon's Eye" could not make the final tracklist there, with the label opting to include "Strange Kind of Woman" instead.

== Releases ==
The original vinyl release was in a gatefold sleeve, with a generic Harvest LP-bag and a lyric-insert. The original UK version had "Demon's Eye" as its third track, but did not include "Strange Kind of Woman", which was instead released as a single there. The US version includes the latter track in place of the former.

Fireball reached the No. 1 position on the UK albums chart, while also hitting No. 1 in several other European countries, such as Germany, Austria, and Sweden. In North America, it outperformed its predecessor, In Rock, reaching No. 32 in the US and No. 24 in Canada.

The boogie-inspired "Strange Kind of Woman" single reached No. 8 in the UK and Germany, and No. 1 in Denmark. "Fireball", the album's title track, was also released as a single and reached No. 15 in the UK.

On 21 October 1996, EMI released a 25th Anniversary Edition of Fireball. It was remastered and includes all seven original tracks and nine bonus tracks. The bonus tracks include out-takes "Freedom" and "Slow Train", and remixed versions of "Strange Kind of Woman", "Demon's Eye", and "No One Came".

In September 2010, a limited-edition 24k gold CD was released by Audio Fidelity. The CD was mastered from the original master tapes by Steve Hoffman. The gold CD contained the original USA track listing with "Strange Kind of Woman" and does not have "Demon's Eye".

== Touring ==
"Strange Kind of Woman" has been a staple of the live set up to the present day, and "Fireball" also made a few live appearances, mainly as an encore as it required Ian Paice to use a double bass drum, which was set up during the break after the main set. "Strange Kind of Woman" and "The Mule" were played regularly live throughout 1972 (and appear on the live album Made in Japan), with the latter replacing an instrumental "Paint It Black" as a vehicle for Paice's drum solo. 1971's Fireball Tour frequently featured "No No No".

"Anyone's Daughter" was played on the 1993–1994 tours, while "Fools", "No One Came", "I'm Alone", and "Demon's Eye" have all made periodic appearances in various tours since 1996.

== Response ==
Most of the band do not consider the album a classic, although it is one of Ian Gillan's favourites. He stated in a 1974 interview: "The reason I liked that so much was because I thought, from a writing point of view, it was really the beginning of tremendous possibilities of expression. And some of the tracks on that album are really, really inventive." However, Gillan also said that the inclusion of "Anyone's Daughter" on the album was "a good bit of fun, but a mistake".

Ritchie Blackmore, in particular, stated publicly that he was not overly pleased with Fireball. He said of the production: "That was a bit of a disaster, because it was thrown together in the studio. Managerial pressure, we had no time. 'You gotta play here, here, there, then you've got to make an LP.' I told them, 'if you want an LP, you've got to give us time.' But they wouldn't. I just threw ideas to the group that I thought up on the spur of the moment."

Jon Lord stated that Fireball "wanders slightly" and "goes to places that the band wasn't expecting it to go to". Lord did praise several songs on the album, including "No No No" and "Fools", and particularly singled out Ian Paice's drumming on the title track.

== Legacy ==
On the 9 April 2011 episode of That Metal Show, guitar virtuoso Yngwie Malmsteen stated that his elder sister had given him Fireball when he was eight years old, and "it changed everything" for him. Similarly, Metallica drummer Lars Ulrich stated that he purchased a copy of Fireball within 12 hours after his father had taken him to a 1973 Deep Purple concert in Copenhagen, and he credits the concert and album for sparking his interest in hard rock music.

Likewise, Michael Monroe stated on Eddie Trunk's podcast that it was the first album he ever bought, and one of the first he ever heard along with Led Zeppelin II, and was a major influence to get him into a career in rock and roll.

King Diamond also mentions Fireball as the first studio album he purchased as a teenager and an important influence in his future career.

== Track listing ==
=== Original European release ===
All tracks are written by Ritchie Blackmore, Ian Gillan, Roger Glover, Jon Lord and Ian Paice.

Side one
No.	Title	Length
1.	"Fireball"	3:25
2.	"No No No"	6:54
3.	"Demon's Eye"	5:21
4.	"Anyone's Daughter"	4:45

Side two
No.	Title	Length
5.	"The Mule"	5:21
6.	"Fools"	8:19
7.	"No One Came"	6:29

=== Original US/Canadian/Japanese release ===
Side one
No.	Title	Length
1.	"Fireball"	3:25
2.	"No No No"	6:54
3.	"Strange Kind of Woman"	4:07
4.	"Anyone's Daughter"	4:43

Side two
No.	Title	Length
5.	"The Mule"	5:23
6.	"Fools"	8:21
7.	"No One Came"	6:28

25th Anniversary Edition bonus tracks
No.	Title	Writer(s)	Length
8.	"Strange Kind of Woman" (A-side remix '96)		4:07
9.	"I'm Alone (single B-side)" (B-side)		3:08
10.	"Freedom" (album out-take)		3:37
11.	"Slow Train" (album out-take)		5:38
12.	"Demon's Eye" (remix '96)		6:13
13.	"The Noise Abatement Society Tapes (Midnight in Moscow, Robin Hood, William Tell)"	Traditional	4:17
14.	"Fireball" (take 1 – instrumental)		4:09
15.	"Backwards Piano" (Reversed piano solo at the end of "No One Came")		0:56
16.	"No One Came" (remix '96)		6:24

== Personnel ==
Deep Purple

- Ian Gillan – vocals
- Ritchie Blackmore – guitars
- Roger Glover – bass guitar
- Jon Lord – keyboards, Hammond organ
- Ian Paice – drums

Production

- Produced by Deep Purple
- Recorded between September 1970 and June 1971 at De Lane Lea Studios and Olympic Studios
- Engineered by Martin Birch, Lou Austin and Alan O'Duffy
- Peter Mew – original album remastering
- Tom Bender – engineering work on the bonus tracks

== Charts ==
=== Weekly charts ===
Chart (1971–1972)	Peak position
Australian Albums (Kent Music Report)	5
Austrian Albums (Ö3 Austria)	1
Belgian Albums (Ultratop Wallonia)	1
Canada Top Albums/CDs (RPM)	24
Danish Albums (Hitlisten)	1
Dutch Albums (Album Top 100)	3
Finnish Albums (The Official Finnish Charts)	2
French Albums (SNEP)	3
German Albums (Offizielle Top 100)	1
Italian Albums (Musica e Dischi)	3
Japanese Albums (Oricon)	66
Norwegian Albums (VG-lista)	2
Swedish Albums (Sverigetopplistan)	1
UK Albums (Official Charts)	1
US Billboard 200	32

=== Year-end charts ===
Chart (1971)	Position
German Albums (Offizielle Top 100)	42

Chart (1972)	Position
German Albums (Offizielle Top 100)	6

== Certifications ==
Region	Certification	Certified units/sales
Germany (BVMI)	Gold	250,000^{^}
Netherlands (NVPI)	Gold	50,000^{^}
Sweden (GLF)	Gold	25,000
United Kingdom (BPI)	Silver	60,000^{‡}
United States (RIAA)	Gold	500,000^{^}
^{^} Shipments figures based on certification alone.^{‡} Sales+streaming figures based on certification alone.
