= Fireball (Deep Purple song) =

- Cover of the 1971 Sweden single

Single by Deep Purple

from the album Fireball
- B-side: "Demon's Eye" (UK); "I'm Alone" (US)
- Released: 29 October 1971
- Recorded: March 1971
- Studio: London
- Genre: Heavy metal; hard rock
- Length: 3:25
- Label: Harvest (UK); Warner Bros. (U.S.)
- Songwriters: Ritchie Blackmore; Ian Gillan; Roger Glover; Jon Lord; Ian Paice
- Producer: Deep Purple

Deep Purple singles chronology
"Strange Kind of Woman" (1971)	"Fireball" (1971)	"Never Before" (1972)

"Fireball" is a song by the English rock band Deep Purple, from the album of the same name. It was also released as the band's second single of 1971, and peaked at No. 15 on the UK Singles Chart.

== Background ==
The song is one of several based on Ian Gillan's real life experiences: "She was a complete mystery to me. This is another tale of unrequited love", he explained.

The song begins with the sound of an air conditioner being switched on, recorded by assistant engineer Mike Thorne. Roger Glover suggested to engineer Martin Birch that the sound of a machine starting up would be a good way to begin both the song and the album, but Birch could not think of anything available that would fit the purpose. Thorne suggested the sound of an air conditioning unit, and duly recorded it, to the band's delight. At the time the members of Deep Purple claimed that the sound was produced by a "special" synthesizer. A promo clip was made for the song, consisting of the band miming to the studio recording in front of a dancing audience.

The song features a rare instance of Ian Paice playing a double-bass drum, thus it often appeared as an encore in the band's live show so the crew would have time to add the extra bass drum to Paice's stage kit. With its fast tempo and rapid guitar picking, the song is often cited as one of the earliest influences in the later development of speed and thrash metal.

== Personnel ==
- Ian Gillan – vocals, tambourine
- Ritchie Blackmore – guitars
- Roger Glover – bass
- Jon Lord – organ
- Ian Paice – drums

== Charts ==
Chart (1971–72)	Peak position
Australia (Kent Music Report)	58
Finland (Suomen virallinen lista)	22
Italy (Musica e dischi)	22
Netherlands (Single Top 100)	24
UK Singles (OCC)	15
West Germany (Official German Charts)	19
