= Abandon (album) =

Studio album by Deep Purple
- Released: 25 May 1998
- Recorded: September 1997-February 1998
- Studios: Greg Rike Studios, Altamonte Springs, Florida
- Genres: Hard rock; heavy metal
- Length: 56:18
- Label: EMI Switzerland
- Producers: Deep Purple & Roger Glover

Deep Purple chronology
Purpendicular (1996)	Abandon (1998)	Bananas (2003)

Abandon is the 16th studio album by the English hard rock band Deep Purple, released on 25 May 1998 in the United Kingdom and on 2 June 1998 in the United States. It was band's second album with guitarist Steve Morse and their last to feature founding member Jon Lord prior to his departure in 2002. The cover art was designed by acclaimed artist Ioannis Nikolaos Vasilopoulos.

The album was followed by a successful 1998–1999 world tour, which saw Deep Purple visit Australia for the first time in 15 years. In 1999, a double live album and DVD, Total Abandon: Australia '99, recorded in Melbourne on 20 April was released.

== Background ==
Following the departure of guitarist Ritchie Blackmore, Deep Purple recruited Steve Morse and released their 1996 studio album Purpendicular with the new line-up. Abandon was the band's second studio album featuring Morse. It continued the new musical direction established on its predecessor while retaining the band's characteristic hard rock sound. The album's title originated from a wordplay devised by vocalist Ian Gillan, "A Band On", which the band later used as the name of their A Band on Tour tour.

Abandon was recorded between September 1997 and February 1998 at Greg Rike Studios in Altamonte Springs, Florida, United States. Deep Purple and bassist Roger Glover co-produced the album, while Darren Schneider handled the recording and mixing. Mixing took place at Platinum Post Studios in Orlando, Florida, and Greg Calbi mastered the album at Masterdisk in New York City.

According to the studio diary kept by bassist Glover during the recording sessions, the band members gathered in Orlando, Florida, in September 1997 and began recording in earnest on 19 September. At the time, the band was working on several songs, with only some of the twelve tracks initially prepared having completed lyrics. The songs were subsequently developed through a combination of songwriting, arranging, recording and revision sessions.

The track "Any Fule Kno That" also underwent several revisions during the production process. According to material documenting Glover's studio diary, he became dissatisfied with the work-in-progress track "Talk Radio" and subsequently began working on a new song, "Any Fule Kno That". The song was also performed during the band's concerts in the United States in December 1997, before the album's release. This demonstrated how the band continued developing new material while combining studio recording with live performances.

Musically, the album features an interplay between Steve Morse's guitar and Jon Lord's keyboards, with blues-based guitar riffs and powerful instrumentation throughout. Most of the tracks were co-written by Ian Gillan, Roger Glover, Jon Lord, Steve Morse and Ian Paice. The final track, "Bludsucker", also credits former guitarist Ritchie Blackmore as a songwriter. It is a re-recorded version of "Bloodsucker", originally featured on the band's 1970 album Deep Purple in Rock.

== Critical reception ==
Professional ratings
Review scores
Source	Rating
AllMusic	3/5 stars
Blogcritics	(favourable)
Collector's Guide to Heavy Metal	10/10
Rock Brigade	7/10

Critic Stephen Thomas Erlewine noted in his review for AllMusic that Deep Purple continued to release new albums consistently in the late 1990s. He remarked that Morse's arrival had brought renewed energy to the band and that, on Abandon, Morse blended more naturally into the band's sound than he had on its predecessor. Meanwhile, critic Martin Popoff, writing for Lollipop, praised the band's musical chemistry and its heavy blues metal sound, while noting that the album lacked the memorable melodies of its predecessor.

Abandon peaked at number 76 on the UK Albums Chart and also entered the charts in several European countries, including Norway and Finland.

== Track listing ==
All tracks are written by Ian Gillan, Roger Glover, Jon Lord, Steve Morse, Ian Paice, except where noted.

No.	Title	Length
1.	"Any Fule Kno That"	4:29
2.	"Almost Human"	4:26
3.	"Don't Make Me Happy"	4:56
4.	"Seventh Heaven"	5:25
5.	"Watching the Sky"	5:26
6.	"Fingers to the Bone"	4:47
7.	"Jack Ruby"	3:48
8.	"She Was"	4:19
9.	"Whatsername"	4:26
10.	"'69"	4:59
11.	"Evil Louie"	4:56
12.	"Bludsucker" (Ritchie Blackmore, Gillan, Glover, Lord, Paice)	4:27

== Personnel ==
Deep Purple

- Ian Gillan – vocals
- Steve Morse – guitars
- Jon Lord – Hammond organ, Korg synthesiser
- Roger Glover – bass guitar
- Ian Paice – drums

Other

- Ioannis – art direction, artwork

Production notes

- Recorded at Greg Rike Studios, Altamonte Springs, Florida, 1997/1998
- Produced by Deep Purple and Roger Glover
- Engineered by Darren Schneider
- Additional engineering by Keith Andrews
- Mixed at Platinum Post Studios, Orlando, Florida by Darren Schneider
- Assistant engineer – Kent Huffnagle with Shannon Brady
- Mastered at Masterdisk, New York by Greg Calbi

== Charts ==
Chart (1998)	Peak position
Austrian Albums (Ö3 Austria)	25
Finnish Albums (Suomen virallinen lista)	14
French Albums (SNEP)	65
German Albums (Offizielle Top 100)	16
Hungarian Albums (MAHASZ)	22
Japanese Albums (Oricon)	58
Norwegian Albums (VG-lista)	6
Scottish Albums (Official Charts)	87
Swedish Albums (Sverigetopplistan)	32
Swiss Albums (Schweizer Hitparade)	46
UK Albums (Official Charts)	76
UK Rock & Metal Albums (Official Charts)	2
