= Speed King =

1970 song by Deep Purple

- Dutch release picture sleeve

Single by Deep Purple

from the album Deep Purple in Rock
- B-side: "Into the Fire"
- Released: May 1970
- Recorded: January 1970
- Studio: IBC (London)
- Genre: Hard rock; heavy metal; proto-speed metal
- Length: 5:55
- Label: Harvest; Warner Bros.
- Songwriters: Ritchie Blackmore; Ian Gillan; Roger Glover; Jon Lord; Ian Paice
- Producer: Deep Purple

Deep Purple singles chronology
"River Deep - Mountain High" (1969)	"Speed King" (1970)	"Strange Kind of Woman" (1971)

"Speed King" is a song by the English rock band Deep Purple, from their 1970 album Deep Purple in Rock. The song has been cited as an influence in the development of speed metal.

Although released as B-side to the "Black Night" single in the United Kingdom and many other countries, "Speed King" was released as a single in its own right in The Netherlands and Germany, ahead of the Deep Purple In Rock album.

== Background ==
"Speed King" was the first Deep Purple song to be written by vocalist Ian Gillan, who stated that before the lyrics were fully formed, the song's working title was "Kneel & Pray". The song reportedly developed from a bass riff by Glover, who was trying to emulate Jimi Hendrix' "Fire". Gillan developed the lyrics by writing down a mix of lines from Elvis Presley, Little Richard and Chuck Berry songs in the order that they came to mind. In an interview with Gillan, he stated: "The first things that came into my head were Chuck Berry and Little Richard words, so I just stole them."

The song has been cited as an influence on the development of speed metal. The song's aggressive guitar riffs, loud volume, and relatively fast tempo would later become some of the defining characteristics of speed metal and other subgenres of heavy metal.

== Personnel ==
Deep Purple

- Ritchie Blackmore – guitar
- Ian Gillan – vocals
- Roger Glover – bass guitar
- Jon Lord – organ
- Ian Paice – drums

Technical personnel

- Deep Purple – production
- Andy Knight – engineer
