= Pictures of Home =

Song by Deep Purple

from the album Machine Head
- Released: March 1972
- Recorded: 6–21 December 1971; Montreux, Switzerland
- Genre: Hard rock; heavy metal
- Length: 5:08
- Label: EMI (UK); Warner Bros. Records (US)
- Songwriters: Ian Gillan; Ritchie Blackmore; Roger Glover; Jon Lord; Ian Paice
- Producer: Deep Purple

"Pictures of Home" is a song by the British hard rock group Deep Purple, from their 1972 album Machine Head. It begins with a drum introduction by Ian Paice and features a fast-paced, driving guitar riff and bass line with several instrumental solos.

== History ==
According to Classic Rock Review: "Pictures of Home" is Deep Purple at their most poignant, a driving rhythm topped by sweeping vocals pushing out deep lyrical motifs, all accented by the distinct, distorted Hammond organ of Jon Lord. Glover even gets a short bass solo in the middle section before Blackmore warms for lift-off before a surprising false stop and comeback makes the song all the more interesting".

It is the only song from Machine Head that was not performed live during Deep Purple's 1972 tour.

Blackmore refused to play the song live. Since his replacement with Steve Morse in 1994, the song has become a recent feature in Deep Purple's live shows. It was the opening song throughout the band's 2005 Rapture of the Deep tour.

In 2010, Pictures of Home documentary film about Ian Gillan was made. The film is based on the footage, made in October 2009, during the rock stars’ visit to Armenia within the framework of “Armenia Grateful 2 Rock” project, and the interview with Ian Gillan, recorded in March 2010.

== Cover versions ==
- Yngwie Malmsteen on album Inspiration (1996)
- Barón Rojo on album Perversiones (2003)
- Pentti Hietanen on album On the Rocks (2005)
- Perfect Strangers (Deep Purple tribute band) on album Live in Klagenfurt (2007)
- Jon Lord on album Live (2011)
- Black Label Society on album Re-Machined: A Tribute to Deep Purple's Machine Head (2012)
- Pictures of Home - Deep Purple Cover - Diceros
