= Purpendicular =

Studio album by Deep Purple
- Released: 5 February 1996
- Recorded: February–October 1995
- Studio: Greg Rike Productions, Altamonte Springs, Florida
- Genre: Hard rock
- Length: 62:16
- Label: RCA
- Producer: Deep Purple

Deep Purple chronology
The Battle Rages On... (1993)	Purpendicular (1996)	Abandon (1998)

Singles from Purpendicular
- 1. "Sometimes I Feel Like Screaming" Released: 1996 (Europe); 2. "The Aviator" Released: 1996 (Germany)

Professional ratings
Review scores
Source	Rating
AllMusic	3/5 stars
Blogcritics	(favourable)
Collector's Guide to Heavy Metal	10/10

Purpendicular is the fifteenth studio album by the English rock band Deep Purple, released on 5 February 1996. It is their first album with guitarist Steve Morse from Dixie Dregs, who replaced Ritchie Blackmore. The album entered the UK Charts on 17 February 1996, where it peaked at No. 58.

== Recording ==
The album was recorded at Greg Rike Productions, Orlando, Florida from February to October 1995 and engineered by Darren Schneider and Keith Andrews. It had a more experimental approach than previous albums. The arrangement to "The Aviator" and "A Touch Away", employed an acoustic folk/celtic arrangement that had not been heard on the band's previous work since "Anyone's Daughter" from Fireball. Several of the songs such as "Vavoom: Ted the Mechanic" featured less keyboard, focusing on guitar. Morse introduced pinch harmonics to the band's sound, such as on "Vavoom: Ted the Mechanic" and "Somebody Stole My Guitar". "Sometimes I Feel Like Screaming" and "Vavoom: Ted the Mechanic" remained regular features in Deep Purple's live setlist in recent tours.

Like the title of the band's following album, Abandon, Purpendicular is a pun; in this case, based on the band's name and the word "Perpendicular".

== Track listing ==
All tracks are written by Ian Gillan, Roger Glover, Jon Lord, Steve Morse, Ian Paice.

No.	Title	Length
1.	"Vavoom: Ted the Mechanic"	4:16
2.	"Loosen My Strings"	5:57
3.	"Soon Forgotten"	4:47
4.	"Sometimes I Feel Like Screaming"	7:29
5.	"Cascades: I'm Not Your Lover"	4:43
6.	"The Aviator"	5:20
7.	"Rosa's Cantina"	5:10
8.	"A Castle Full of Rascals"	5:11
9.	"A Touch Away"	4:36
10.	"Hey Cisco"	5:53
11.	"Somebody Stole My Guitar"	4:09
12.	"The Purpendicular Waltz"	4:45

Japanese and US edition bonus tracks
No.	Title	Length
13.	"(empty track)"
14.	"Don't Hold Your Breath"	4:39

Expanded edition bonus tracks
No.	Title	Length
13.	"Don't Hold Your Breath"	4:40
14.	"Sometimes I Feel Like Screaming" (single edit)	4:35

== Personnel ==
Deep Purple

- Ian Gillan – lead vocals, harmonica
- Steve Morse – guitars, backing vocals
- Jon Lord – Hammond organ, Korg synthesiser, piano
- Roger Glover – bass guitar
- Ian Paice – drums

Production

- Deep Purple – production
- Darren Schneider, Keith Andrews – engineers, mixing at Parc Studios, Orlando, Florida
- Adam Barber – assistant engineer
- Joe Smith, Roger Glover – mix assistants
- Greg Calbi – mastering at Masterdisk, New York

== Charts ==
Chart (1996)	Peak position
Austrian Albums (Ö3 Austria)	16
Belgian Albums (Ultratop Wallonia)	47
Dutch Albums (Album Top 100)	87
Finnish Albums (Suomen virallinen lista)	9
German Albums (Offizielle Top 100)	20
Hungarian Albums (MAHASZ)	17
Japanese Albums (Oricon)	28
Norwegian Albums (VG-lista)	30
Scottish Albums (OCC)	82
Swedish Albums (Sverigetopplistan)	3
Swiss Albums (Schweizer Hitparade)	17
UK Albums (OCC)	58
UK Rock & Metal Albums (OCC)	4
