= Rapture of the Deep tour =

2006–11 concert tour by Deep Purple

Rapture of the Deep World Tour
- Concert by Deep Purple
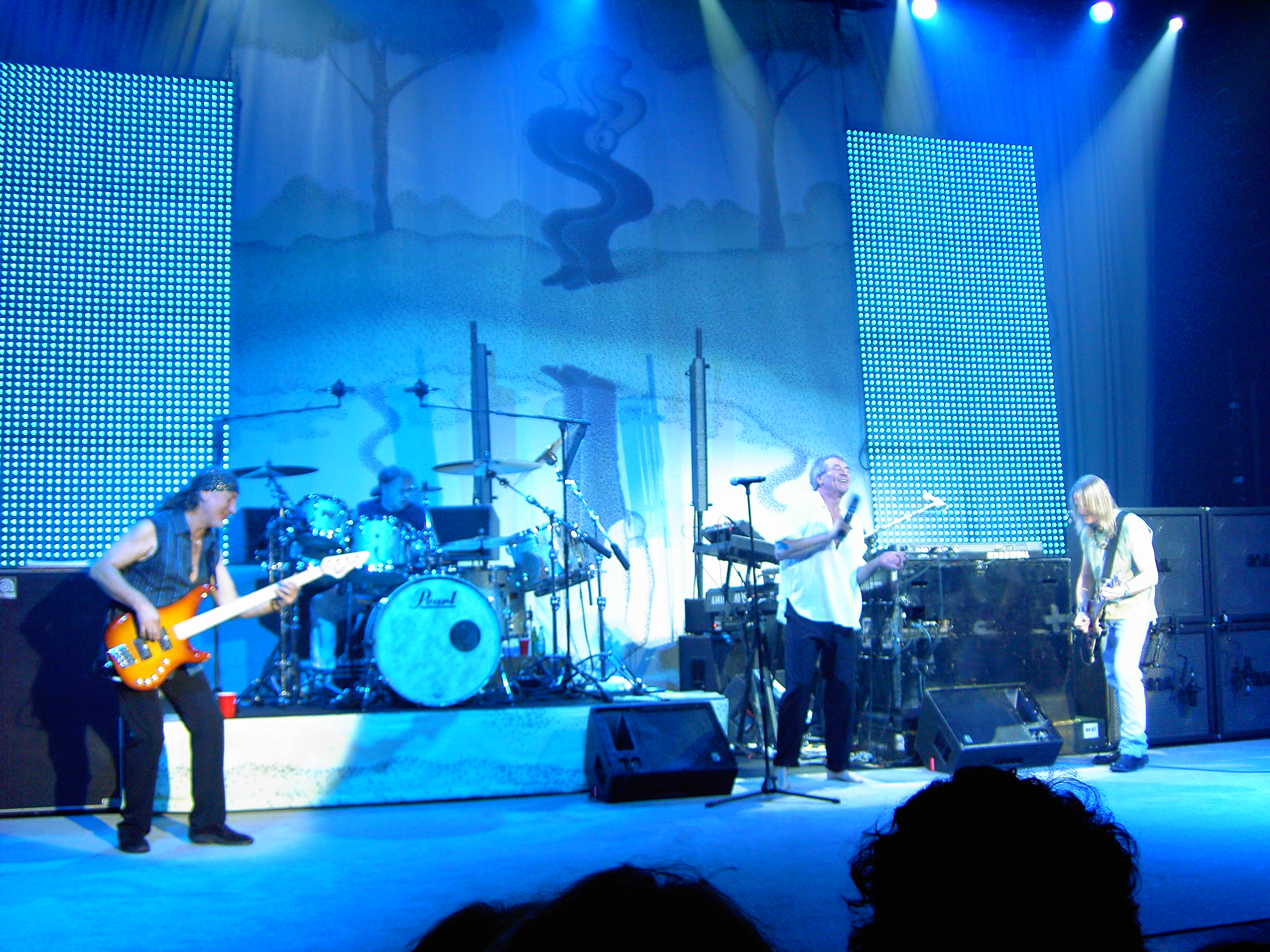
- Location: Asia; Europe; North America; Oceania; South America
- Associated album: Rapture of the Deep (2005)
- Start date: 17 January 2006
- End date: 25 May 2011
- Legs: 26
- No. of shows: 485

Deep Purple concert chronology
- Bananas World Tour (2003–2005); Rapture of the Deep World Tour (2006–2011); The Songs That Built Rock Tour (2011–2012)

The Rapture of the Deep tour was a worldwide concert tour by English hard rock band Deep Purple.

It took place in support of their 2005 studio album Rapture of the Deep. It is supposed to be one of the most successful and long-lasting tours the band has ever done. In 2007, it was voted #6 tour of the year by listeners of the Planet Rock radio station.

== Overview ==
In 2005, Deep Purple released the Rapture of the Deep studio album which enjoyed a modest success, especially in Europe where it charted Top 20 in several countries.

In support of their new studio album, Deep Purple embarked in a world tour during which they covered five continents and played in more than 50 countries. They did over 28 legs in Europe, UK, North America, South America, Asia, Africa and Australia, playing almost 500 shows in six years. Venue sizes varied from big concert halls to the world's largest arenas and stadiums.

During the tour, Deep Purple headlined several of the world's biggest festivals, including:

- Monsters of Rock at Milton Keynes Bowl (UK) (40,000 attended),
- Montreux Jazz Festival (Switzerland) (80,000 attended),
- Fête de l'Humanité (France) (100,000 attended),
- Sweden Rock Festival (Sweden) (50,000 attended),
- Monsters of Rock (Spain) (30,000 attended),
- Cosquin Rock (Argentina) (100,000 attended),
- Rock on the Volga (Russia) (200,000 attended), the biggest crowd in Deep Purple history together with rock music festival California Jam of 1974.

Although some fans called the 2010 leg simply "World Tour" (since at that time only one song from Rapture of the Deep – the title track – remained in the set list), Don Airey, the band's keyboardist, said it's still the Rapture of the Deep tour.

== Tour history ==
=== 2006 ===
The Rapture of the Deep tour kicked off with an intimate sold-out show at London's Astoria hall, and quickly moved on to a sold-out European tour, booked in the continent's biggest arenas.

After two sold-out shows at Argentina's Luna Park Stadium, the band played one festival date in Chile and after a one-month break they moved straight to Australia. The 10 dates on the Australian leg proved to be extremely successful; tickets sold out very quickly and promoters had to add more dates. The band sold over 50,000 tickets for the Australian leg and moved to Japan with 5 concerts.

A second huge European leg followed in summer. Deep Purple kicked it off with the extremely successful gig at Milton Keynes Bowl, in front of over 50,000 people. Besides the single shows, they played many festival dates as headliners, such as Sweden Rock Festival (attendance: 50,000) and Montreux Jazz Festival. The Montreux show was recorded professionally and later released on CD/DVD called They All Came Down to Montreux. The European leg lasted over 6 months and they played Europe's biggest arenas, all sold-out.

On 17 December 2006, Deep Purple played a gig at Cathedral School Grounds, Bangalore, India.

Deep Purple ended the 2006 tour with a successful South American leg, 11 arena + stadium dates.

=== 2007 ===
2007 began with a huge European tour again. After visiting Italy and France, they moved to the full UK arena tour, playing at sold-out Wembley Arena, LG Arena and Windsor Hall, overall 10 dates in the UK. However, singer Ian Gillan announced at a Wembley show that it was the last time they would play at the arena, because of the rudeness of security guards, who beat several fans during the show.

Summer 2007 saw Deep Purple overseas, on a full North American tour. 27 dates in USA and 3 in Canada. In the USA they mostly played at big arenas and amphitheaters, plus several theaters and two sold out dates at the House of Blues of Chicago. After playing at Montreal's Bell Centre in front of 10,000 people, they moved to New York to play in the Radio City Music Hall. The North American leg ended with a sold-out intimate show at Dallas's House of Blues

2007's last leg was Europe again. Deep Purple kicked it off at Bucharest's National Stadium and the tour lasted over one month.

At the end of year Deep Purple received a special award in France, for selling 150,000 concert tickets in the country in one year. Officials said Deep Purple sold more tickets than any music artist has ever done in one year in France.

=== 2008 ===
2008 began with a second full South American leg, with 13 dates in 6 countries. Tickets for the show at Buenos Aires's Luna Park Stadium sold out quickly, prompting promoters to announce a second date at the same stadium.

A European festival tour followed in the summer. The first gig was Monsters of Rock in Spain. Deep Purple was due to headline the festival's first day (the second day to be headlined by Iron Maiden). Unfortunately, a severe rainstorm washed out tens of thousands people and damaged the stage. So, promoters had to cancel the whole festival. After two sold-out shows at Teatro Smeraldo in Milan, Deep Purple headlined Montreux Jazz Festival for the second time on the Rapture Tour. Festival dates also included Deep Purple as a headliner at: "British Motorshow & Music Festival", UK, "Festival de la cite de Carcassonne", "Les Nuits de la Guitare", France "Zweite Classic Rocknacht", "Magic Night of Rock" Germany and "Steinkjer Rock" Norway.

The Israel fall tour proved to be phenomenally successful for the band. Deep Purple's last gig in the country was in 1991, when the band was led by Joe Lynn Turner. This time, led by Ian Gillan promoters announced one show at Caesarea Amphitheatre. The first gig was sold out in three days, so promoters added a second one, which sold-out in one week. That prompted promoters to add a third gig at the same arena, and one at Tel Aviv. Israeli press called Deep Purple's tour a "phenomenal success", and the band sold the most tickets in the country that have ever sold in the same year. After the 4 sold-out shows, the press called it the "event of the year"

The 2008 tour ended with a Russia/Ukraine/Germany Arena tour, in 10,000-15,000 capacity arenas, all sold-out.

=== 2009 ===
2009's first gig saw Deep Purple as a headliner band on the World Ski Championship. After this one-off show they quickly moved to South America. Although Ian Gillan caught a flu and was extremely ill, with the 11 dates in South America Deep Purple sold over 250,000 tickets (including 150 000 tickets at Cosquin Rock festival, 50,000 at Antofagasta's velodrome, 20,000 tickets at two sold-out shows at Luna Park Stadium and 15,000 tickets at two sold-out shows at São Paulo's Via Funchall hall). Ian Gillan released a special video message about his illness, as fans were worried by his vocal conditions caused by the flu.

After headlining the "Dubai Bike Week 2009" in front of some 30,000 people, Deep Purple moved to their second Japanese tour during the Rapture Tour with guitarist Yngwie Malmsteen as a support act.

Spring/summer saw the band at a huge European arena tour again. Deep Purple made a one show at Istanbul's Kurucesme Arena. This was particular show, as 500 fans (out of the 20,000) had travelled from Georgia, Tbilisi and Ian Gillan made a very special meet and greet with Georgian fans. Later in an interview Gillan called it one of the most wonderful days on the tour, as he has very special memories from Georgia, as it the place where he married his wife Bron Gillan, in 1990.

After playing their own festival dates, suddenly Deep Purple were called by the promoter of Rock am See and 1-Day Milano Urban Festival. The festival was supposed to be headlined by Oasis, but they split. So, the promoters had to replace them with another headliner. They choose Deep Purple. According to the bassist Roger Glover, they were not sure what was going to happen, as Oasis plays different kind of music and most of the ticket holders were fans of different music than Deep Purple plays. The promoter later announced that The band saved a festival. 90% of Oasis' fans watched Deep Purple's concert and after the show, they were posting on the forum that they were overwhelmed by the gig. Kasabian's leader was watching the show from backstage and later said that it was the greatest concert he has ever seen.

At the end of the leg Deep Purple played at a notorious French political gig Fête de l'Humanité in Paris, France. The concert was attended by 110,000 people.

In late 2009 the band went on a small UK Tour, visiting several theaters (including two sold-out gigs at the Hammersmith Apollo, + one big show at LG Arena.

20 dates European leg followed and the 2009 tour ended at Bologna. The show was broadcast live on Italian RAI radio1 and was quickly heavily bootlegged.

=== 2010 ===
Deep Purple played 79 dates: Mexico, South East Asia, Australia, South Africa & Europe.

=== 2011 ===
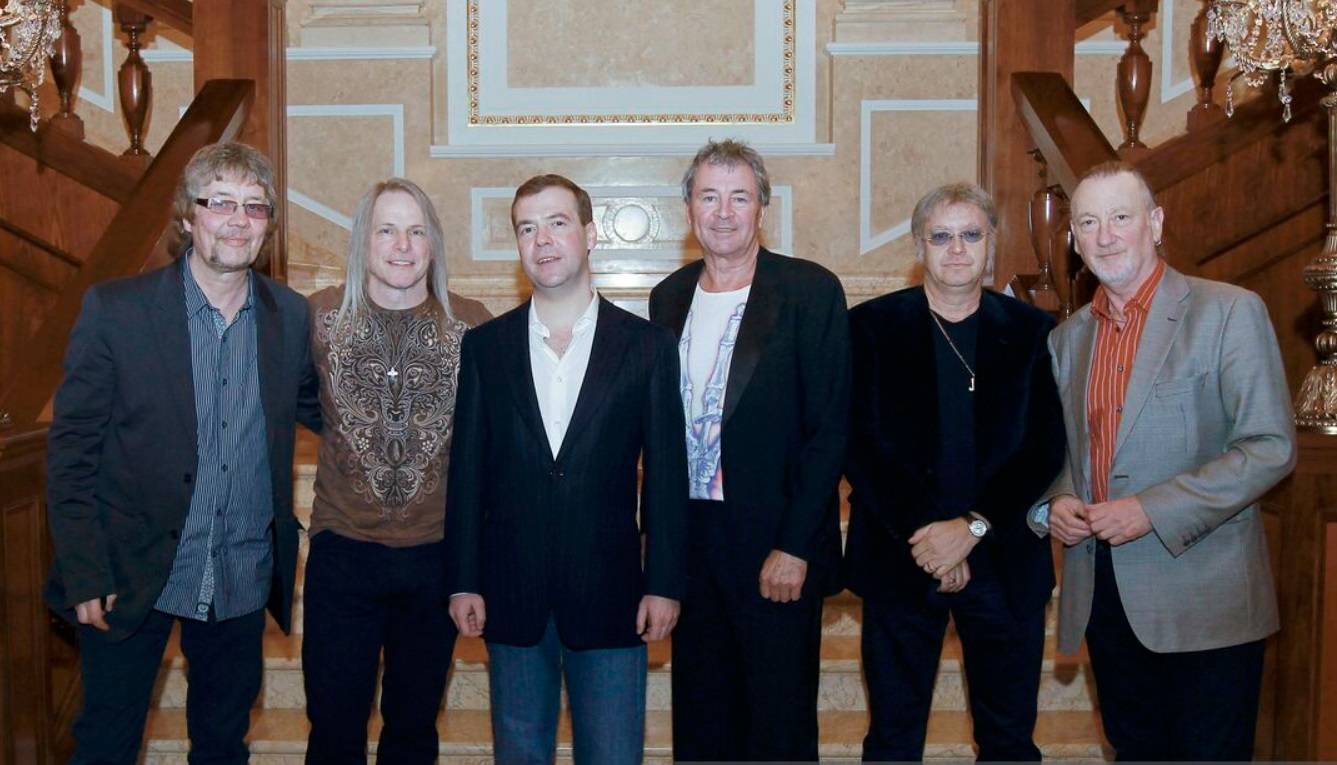
Deep Purple fan, Russian president Dmitry Medvedev hosted the band in the Moscow Kremlin on 23 March 2011.

After a 4-date tour in Mexico in February, Deep Purple has planned to play the Commonwealth of Independent States, Eastern Europe & Israel in spring (14 dates).

During the Greece leg of the tour Roger Glover announced his absence from the band due a shoulder injury, and was temporarily replaced by the current The Temperance Movement bassist Nick Fyffe for a series of shows during May of that year.

== Tour dates ==
Date	City	Country	Venue
Europe
17 January 2006	London	England	London Astoria
19 January 2006	Lyon	France	Halle Tony Garnier
21 January 2006	Madrid	Spain	La Cubierta
22 January 2006	Barcelona	Spain	Vall dHebron
24 January 2006	Paris	France	Le Zénith
25 January 2006	Brussels	Belgium	Forest National
26 January 2006	Amsterdam	Netherlands	Heineken Music Hall
28 January 2006	Copenhagen	Denmark	K.B. Hallen
29 January 2006	Oslo	Norway	Oslo Spektrum
31 January 2006	Jyväskylä	Finland	Icehall
1 February 2006	Helsinki	Finland	Helsinki Ice Hall
2 February 2006	Tallinn	Estonia	Saku Arena
3 February 2006	Vilnius	Lithuania	Siemens Arena
6 February 2006	Berlin	Germany	Max-Schmeling-Halle
7 February 2006	Kiel	Germany	Ostseehalle
9 February 2006	Nuremberg	Germany	Nuremberg Arena
10 February 2006	Dortmund	Germany	Westfalenhallen
11 February 2006	Stuttgart	Germany	Hanns-Martin-Schleyer-Halle
12 February 2006	Erfurt	Germany	Messehalle, Erfurt
14 February 2006	Trier	Germany	Trier Arena
15 February 2006	Wetzlar	Germany	Mittelhessen Arena
17 February 2006	Mannheim	Germany	SAP Arena
18 February 2006	Munich	Germany	Olympiahalle
19 February 2006	Zürich	Switzerland	Hallenstadion
21 February 2006	Linz	Austria	Intersportarena
22 February 2006	Brno	Czech Republic	Hala Rondo
23 February 2006	Liberec	Czech Republic	Tipsport Arena
24 February 2006	Katowice	Poland	Spodek
26 February 2006	Budapest	Hungary	Budapest Sports Arena
27 February 2006	Belgrade	Serbia and Montenegro	Belgrade Fair – Hall 1
1 March 2006	Rome	Italy	Tendastriscie
2 March 2006	Milan	Italy	Palalido
South America
24 March 2006	Buenos Aires	Argentina	Luna Park
25 March 2006	Santiago	Chile	Pista Atlética Estadio Nacional
Oceania
26 April 2006	Wellington	New Zealand	Wellington Convention Centre
27 April 2006	Auckland	New Zealand	Logan Campbell Centre
29 April 2006	Melbourne	Australia	Palais Theatre
30 April 2006	Melbourne	Australia	Palais Theatre
1 May 2006	Adelaide	Australia	Thebarton Theatre
3 May 2006	Perth	Australia	Challenge Stadium
7 May 2006	Brisbane	Australia	Brisbane Convention & Exhibition Centre
9 May 2006	Sydney	Australia	Hordern Pavilion
10 May 2006	Sydney	Australia	Hordern Pavilion
12 May 2006	Wollongong	Australia	Wollongong Entertainment Centre
13 May 2006	Newcastle	Australia	Newcastle Entertainment Centre
14 May 2006	Canberra	Australia	Royal Theatre
Asia
17 May 2006	Fukuoka	Japan	Mielparque Hall
18 May 2006	Osaka	Japan	Koseinenkin Kaikan
19 May 2006	Nagoya	Japan	Shi Kokaido
21 May 2006	Tokyo	Japan	Shibuya-AX
22 May 2006	Tokyo	Japan	Tokyo International Forum
Europe
3 June 2006	Milton Keynes	England	Milton Keynes Bowl
5 June 2006	Rostock	Germany	Parkbühne IGA
6 June 2006	Emden	Germany	Nordseehalle
8 June 2006	Sölvesborg	Sweden	Sweden Rock Festival
9 June 2006	Lichtenvoorde	Netherlands	Arrow Rock Festival
10 June 2006	Middlefart	Denmark	Rock Under Broen
12 June 2006	Grefrath	Germany	Eissporthalle
13 June 2006	Osnabrück	Germany	Stadthalle
15 June 2006	Bonn	Germany	Kunst-und Ausstellungshalle
16 June 2006	Bad Brückenau	Germany	Staatsbad
17 June 2006	Gräfenhainichen	Germany	Ferropolis
21 June 2006	Tromsø	Norway	Polarhallen
22 June 2006	Bodø	Norway	Bodø Kulturhus
23 June 2006	Hell	Norway	Hell Music Festival
24 June 2006	Bergen	Norway	Koengen
6 July 2006	Innsbruck	Austria	Hafen
7 July 2006	Trento	Italy	Stadio Briamasco
8 July 2006	Wiesen	Austria	Festivalgelände
10 July 2006	Cattolica	Italy	Arena della Regina
11 July 2006	Latina	Italy	Francioni Stadium
12 July 2006	Brescia	Italy	Piazza del Duomo
14 July 2006	Zottegem	Belgium	Rock Zottegem
15 July 2006	Montreux	Switzerland	Montreux Jazz Festival
17 July 2006	Monte Carlo	Monaco	Sporting Club
18 July 2006	Monte Carlo	Monaco	Sporting Club
22 July 2006	Faro	Portugal	Concentração Motard de Faro
24 July 2006	Athens	Greece	Melina Merkouri Theatre
Europe
3 October 2006	Salzburg	Austria	Arena
4 October 2006	Bratislava	Slovakia	Incheba Hall
5 October 2006	Ljubljana	Slovenia	Tivoli Hall
7 October 2006	Košice	Slovakia	Stell Arena
8 October 2006	Ostrava	Czech Republic	ČEZ Aréna
9 October 2006	Warsaw	Poland	Torwar Hall
11 October 2006	Kyiv	Ukraine	Palace of Sports
13 October 2006	Almaty	Kazakhstan	Palace of the Republic
14 October 2006	Almaty	Kazakhstan	Palace of the Republic
16 October 2006	Yekaterinburg	Russia	Kosmos Concert Hall
18 October 2006	Kazan	Russia	Palace of Sports
19 October 2006	Moscow	Russia	Olympic Stadium
20 October 2006	Saint Petersburg	Russia	Ice Arena
4 November 2006	Lille	France	Zenith de Lille
5 November 2006	Caen	France	Zenith de Caen
7 November 2006	Amnéville	France	Le Galaxie
8 November 2006	Dijon	France	Zenith de Dijon
9 November 2006	Toulouse	France	Zenith de Toulouse
11 November 2006	Bruz	France	Musikhall
12 November 2006	Clermont-Ferrand	France	Zenith D'Auvergne
13 November 2006	Nice	France	Palais Nikaïa
14 November 2006	Marseille	France	Le Dome
South America
23 November 2006	Montevideo	Uruguay	Velodromo
25 November 2006	Porto Alegre	Brazil	Gigantinho
26 November 2006	Curitiba	Brazil	Master Hall
28 November 2006	São Paulo	Brazil	Tom Brasil
29 November 2006	São Paulo	Brazil	Tom Brasil
1 December 2006	Rio de Janeiro	Brazil	Riocentro
2 December 2006	Vitória	Brazil	Praça Do Papa
3 December 2006	Belo Horizonte	Brazil	Chevrolet Hall
5 December 2006	Rosario	Argentina	Estadio Cubierto Newell's Old Boys
6 December 2006	Córdoba	Argentina	Estadio General Paz Juniors
7 December 2006	Buenos Aires	Argentina	Arena Obras Sanitarias
9 December 2006	Viña del Mar	Chile	Quinta Vergara Amphitheater
Asia
17 December 2006	Bangalore	India	Cathedral Grounds
Europe
4 March 2007	Tirana	Albania	Congress Palace
7 March 2007	Parma	Italy	PalaRaschi
9 March 2007	Palermo	Italy	Palasport
10 March 2007	Acireale	Italy	PalaTupparello
12 March 2007	Reggio Calabria	Italy	PalaCalafiore
13 March 2007	Andria	Italy	Palasport
16 March 2007	Reims	France	Parc Expo
17 March 2007	Tours	France	Grand Hall De Tours
19 March 2007	Nantes	France	Zenith
20 March 2007	Rouen	France	Zenith
22 March 2007	La Rochelle	France	Parc Expo
23 March 2007	Pau	France	Zenith
25 March 2007	Strasbourg	France	Hall Rhenus
26 March 2007	Beauvais	France	Elispace
28 March 2007	Bordeaux	France	Patinoire
29 March 2007	Saint-Étienne	France	Palais Des Spectacle
30 March 2007	Grenoble	France	Palais Des Spectacle
31 March 2007	Limoges	France	Zenith
21 April 2007	Newcastle	England	Metro Radio Arena
22 April 2007	Manchester	England	MEN Arena
24 April 2007	Nottingham	England	Nottingham Arena
25 April 2007	Cardiff	Wales	CIA Arena
27 April 2007	Bournemouth	England	Windsor Hall
28 April 2007	London	England	Wembley Arena
29 April 2007	Brighton	England	Brighton Centre
1 May 2007	Glasgow	Scotland	Clyde Auditorium
2 May 2007	Sheffield	England	Hallam FM Arena
3 May 2007	Birmingham	England	National Exhibition Centre
5 May 2007	Genoa	Italy	Palasport
7 May 2007	Auxerre	France	Parc Expo
8 May 2007	Montpellier	France	Zenith Sud
9 May 2007	Nancy	France	Zenith
11 May 2007	Zurich	Switzerland	Hallenstadion
12 May 2007	Geneva	Switzerland	Arena
16 May 2007	Sandnes	Norway	Classic Rock Festival
18 May 2007	Antwerp	Belgium	Lotto Arena
19 May 2007	Hellendoorn	Netherlands	Dauwpop
20 May 2007	Luxembourg	Luxembourg	The Rockhal
23 May 2007	Helsinki	Finland	Jäähalli
24 May 2007	Joensuu	Finland	Areena
26 May 2007	Jelling	Denmark	Jelling Festival
27 May 2007	Reykjavík	Iceland	Laugardalshöll
North America
12 July 2007	Atlanta	United States	Chastain Park Amphitheatre
13 July 2007	Orlando	United States	House of Blues
14 July 2007	Boca Raton	United States	Pompano Beach Amphitheatre
15 July 2007	Clearwater	United States	Ruth Eckerd Hall
18 July 2007	South Bend	United States	Morris Civic Performing Arts Center
19 July 2007	Cadott	United States	Rock Fest
21 July 2007	Farwell	United States	Mountain Rock Music Festival
22 July 2007	Chicago	United States	House of Blues
23 July 2007	Chicago	United States	House of Blues
24 July 2007	St. Louis	United States	The Pageant
26 July 2007	London	Canada	Hawk Rocks the Park
27 July 2007	Clarkston	United States	DTE Energy Music Theatre
28 July 2007	Montreal	Canada	Bell Centre
29 July 2007	Quebec City	Canada	Pavilion de la Jeunesse
31 July 2007	Boston	United States	Bank of America Pavilion
2 August 2007	Wallingford	United States	Chevrolet Theatre
4 August 2007	Atlantic City	United States	House of Blues
7 August 2007	New York City	United States	Radio City Music Hall
8 August 2007	Hampton Beach	United States	Hampton Beach Casino Ballroom
9 August 2007	Bethlehem	United States	Musikfest
12 August 2007	Costa Mesa	United States	Pacific Amphitheatre
13 August 2007	Ventura	United States	Ventura Theater
15 August 2007	San Francisco	United States	The Warfield
16 August 2007	San Diego	United States	4th & B Concert Theater
17 August 2007	Phoenix	United States	Maricopa Event Center
18 August 2007	Paradise	United States	The Joint
21 August 2007	Denver	United States	Fillmore Auditorium
23 August 2007	San Antonio	United States	Majestic Theater
24 August 2007	Houston	United States	Verizon Wireless Theater
25 August 2007	Dallas	United States	House of Blues
Europe
31 October 2007	Bucharest	Romania	National Stadium
1 November 2007	Sofia	Bulgaria	Festivalna Hall
3 November 2007	Sarajevo	Bosnia and Herzegovina	Olympic Hall Zetra
4 November 2007	Split	Croatia	Sporthall
6 November 2007	Budapest	Hungary	Sportaréna
8 November 2007	Graz	Austria	Eishalle
9 November 2007	Pordenone	Italy	Palasport Forum
10 November 2007	Mantua	Italy	PalaBam
12 November 2007	Varese	Italy	PalaWhirlpool
14 November 2007	Châteauroux	France	Le Tarmac
15 November 2007	Toulon	France	Zenith
16 November 2007	Perpignan	France	Parc des Expos
18 November 2007	Paris	France	Olympia
19 November 2007	Liège	Belgium	Country Hall
21 November 2007	Le Havre	France	Docks Oceane
22 November 2007	Angers	France	Amphitea 4000
23 November 2007	Brest	France	Parc de Penfeld
25 November 2007	Le Mans	France	Antarès
26 November 2007	Orléans	France	Zenith
27 November 2007	Angoulême	France	Espace Carat
28 November 2007	Besançon	France	Micropolis
Latin America
14 February 2008	Monterrey	Mexico	Monterrey Arena
16 February 2008	Mexico City	Mexico	Plaza de Toros
17 February 2008	Zapopan	Mexico	Auditorio Telmex
20 February 2008	Lima	Peru	Estadio Nacional
22 February 2008	Rio de Janeiro	Brazil	Citibank Hall
23 February 2008	Curitiba	Brazil	Hellooch
24 February 2008	São Paulo	Brazil	Credicard Hall
26 February 2008	Buenos Aires	Argentina	Luna Park
28 February 2008	Concepción	Chile	Estadio Regional
1 March 2008	Santiago	Chile	Teatro Caupolicán
2 March 2008	Buenos Aires	Argentina	Luna Park
6 March 2008	Quito	Ecuador	Casa de la Cultura Ecuatoriana
8 March 2008	Caracas	Venezuela	Anfiteatro del Centro Sambil
Europe
12 July 2008	Pistoia	Italy	Duomo Square
13 July 2008	Turin	Italy	Colonia Sonora Open Air
15 July 2008	Milan	Italy	Teatro Smeraldo
16 July 2008	Milan	Italy	Teatro Smeraldo
18 July 2008	Verona	Italy	Castello de Villafranca
19 July 2008	Montreux	Switzerland	Montreux Jazz Festival
20 July 2008	Carcassonne	France	Festival de la cite de Carcassonne
22 July 2008	Patrimonio	France	Les Nuits de la Guitare
26 July 2008	Cologne	Germany	Open Air am Tanzbrunnen
27 July 2008	Tienen	Belgium	Suikerrock
30 July 2008	London	England	ExCeL London
1 August 2008	Siegen	Germany	Siegerlandhalle
2 August 2008	Ravensburg	Germany	Oberschwabenhalle
3 August 2008	Benediktbeuern	Germany	Kloster
6 August 2008	Copenhagen	Denmark	K.B. Hallen
8 August 2008	Linköping	Sweden	Cloetta Center
9 August 2008	Ystad	Sweden	Öja Slott
10 August 2008	Odense	Denmark	Arena Fyn (OCC)
12 August 2008	Helsinki	Finland	Jäähalli
13 August 2008	Kuopio	Finland	Kuopio Arena
15 August 2008	Steinkjer	Norway	Guldbergaunet Stadion
17 August 2008	Tallinn	Estonia	Saku Suurhall Arena
18 August 2008	Riga	Latvia	Arena Riga
5 September 2008	Khanty-Mansiysk	Russia	City Square
Middle East
8 September 2008	Caesarea	Israel	Caesarea Amphitheater
9 September 2008	Tel Aviv	Israel	Hangar 11
13 September 2008	Castellon de la Plana	Spain	Pinar del Grao
17 September 2008	Caesarea	Israel	Caesarea Amphitheater
18 September 2008	Caesarea	Israel	Caesarea Amphitheater
Europe
12 October 2008	Dnipropetrovsk	Ukraine	
13 October 2008	Odesa	Ukraine	
15 October 2008	Kyiv	Ukraine	
17 October 2008	Cherkasy	Ukraine	
19 October 2008	Rostov-on-Don	Russia	
20 October 2008	Voronezh	Russia	
21 October 2008	Nizhny Novgorod	Russia	
23 October 2008	Novosibirsk	Russia	
24 October 2008	Perm	Russia	
25 October 2008	Kazan	Russia	
27 October 2008	Moscow	Russia	
28 October 2008	Saint Petersburg	Russia	
31 October 2008	Leipzig	Germany	Arena Leipzig
1 November 2008	Hanover	Germany	AWD Hall
2 November 2008	Kassel	Germany	Eissporthalle
4 November 2008	Erfurt	Germany	Messehalle
6 November 2008	Kiel	Germany	Sparkassen-Arena
7 November 2008	Frankfurt	Germany	Festhalle Frankfurt
8 November 2008	Stuttgart	Germany	Hanns-Martin-Schleyer-Halle
11 November 2008	Berlin	Germany	Max-Schmeling-Halle
13 November 2008	Oberhausen	Germany	König Pilsener Arena
14 November 2008	Karlsruhe	Germany	Europahalle
15 November 2008	Munich	Germany	Olympiahalle
17 November 2008	Bamberg	Germany	Jako Arena
18 November 2008	Basel	Switzerland	St. Jakobshalle
18 February 2009	Liberec	Czech Republic	Tipsport Arena
South America
20 February 2009	Buenos Aires	Argentina	Luna Park
21 February 2009	Córdoba	Argentina	Comuna San Roque
22 February 2009	Buenos Aires	Argentina	Luna Park
24 February 2009	Puerto Montt	Chile	Arena Puerto Montt
26 February 2009	Santiago	Chile	Teatro Caupolicán
28 February 2009	Antofagasta	Chile	Club Hípico de Antofagasta
2 March 2009	Porto Alegre	Brazil	Teatro do Bourbon Country
3 March 2009	Porto Alegre	Brazil	Teatro do Bourbon Country
5 March 2009	Florianópolis	Brazil	Floripa Music Hall
6 March 2009	São Paulo	Brazil	Via Funchal
7 March 2009	São Paulo	Brazil	Via Funchal
Middle East
20 March 2009	Dubai	United Arab Emirates	Dubai Bike Week 2009
Asia
8 April 2009	Tokyo	Japan	Tokyo International Forum
9 April 2009	Nagoya	Japan	Zepp
10 April 2009	Hiroshima	Japan	Koseinenkin Kaikan
12 April 2009	Kanazawa	Japan	Kanko Kaikan
13 April 2009	Osaka	Japan	Koseinenkin Kaikan
15 April 2009	Tokyo	Japan	Tokyo International Forum
Europe
18 April 2009	Moscow	Russia	B1 Maximum
19 April 2009	Moscow	Russia	B1 Maximum
1 May 2009	Wrocław	Poland	Pola Marsowe
2 May 2009	Ostrava	Czech Republic	ČEZ Aréna
3 May 2009	Bratislava	Slovakia	NTC
4 May 2009	Prague	Czech Republic	Tesla Arena
10 June 2009	Dortmund	Germany	Westfalenhalle
12 June 2009	Oberhof	Germany	Rennsteig Arena
13 June 2009	Mühldorf	Germany	Trabrennbahn with Status Quo
9 July 2009	Locarno	Switzerland	Moon and Stars Festival
10 July 2009	Wiesen	Austria	Lovely Days Festival, Festivalgelände
11 July 2009	Lakselv	Norway	Midtnattsrocken Festival
13 July 2009	Copenhagen	Denmark	KB-Hallen
14 July 2009	Västerås	Sweden	Bombardier Arena
15 July 2009	Gothenburg	Sweden	Trädgårdsföreningen
17 July 2009	Kotka	Finland	Meripaivat
18 July 2009	Tampere	Finland	Tampereen Jäähalli
20 July 2009	Istanbul	Turkey	Turkcell Kuruçeşme Arena
22 July 2009	Athens	Greece	Terra Vibe Park
23 July 2009	Thessaloniki	Greece	Moni Lazariston
25 July 2009	Baalbek	Lebanon	Baalbek International Festival
28 August 2009	Arbon	Switzerland	
29 August 2009	Konstanz	Germany	Bodenseestadion
30 August 2009	Milan	Italy	1-Day Milano Urban Festival
31 August 2009	Rho	Italy	I-Day Festival
11 September 2009	Le Noirmont	Switzerland	
12 September 2009	Paris	France	Parc de La Courneuve
14 September 2009	Barcelona	Spain	
15 September 2009	Madrid	Spain	
18 September 2009	Sochi	Russia	
10 November 2009	Manchester	England	Manchester Apollo
11 November 2009	Glasgow	Scotland	Clyde Auditorium
13 November 2009	Birmingham	England	LG Arena
14 November 2009	London	England	Hammersmith Apollo
15 November 2009	London	England	Hammersmith Apollo
17 November 2009	Amsterdam	Netherlands	
18 November 2009	Antwerp	Belgium	
21 November 2009	Aarhus	Denmark	Scandinavian Congress Centre
22 November 2009	Oslo	Norway	
24 November 2009	Helsinki	Finland	
25 November 2009	Oulu	Finland	Club Teatria
27 November 2009	Jönköping	Sweden	
28 November 2009	Leksand	Sweden	
1 December 2009	Amiens	France	Le Zénith
2 December 2009	Nantes	France	Le Zénith
3 December 2009	Toulouse	France	Le Zénith
5 December 2009	Marseille	France	Le Dôme
7 December 2009	Chambéry	France	Le Phare
8 December 2009	Montbéliard	France	L'Axone
10 December 2009	Bolzano	Italy	Palaonda
11 December 2009	Venice	Italy	Palasport Jesolo
12 December 2009	Rome	Italy	PalaLottomatica
14 December 2009	Perugia	Italy	PalaEvangelisti
15 December 2009	Milan	Italy	Mediolanum Forum
16 December 2009	Bologna	Italy	Paladozza
North America
5 April 2010	Zacatecas	Mexico	Festival Cultural de Zacatecas
Oceania
27 April 2010	Brisbane	Australia	Convention Centre
28 April 2010	Sydney	Australia	Entertainment Centre
29 April 2010	Newcastle	Australia	Entertainment Centre
1 May 2010	Canberra	Australia	Royal Theatre
2 May 2010	Melbourne	Australia	Festival Hall
3 May 2010	Adelaide	Australia	Entertainment Centre
5 May 2010	Perth	Australia	Challenge Stadium
Asia
8 May 2010	Taipei	Taiwan	Nangang Exhibition Hall
10 May 2010	Hong Kong	Hong Kong	AsiaWorld Expo – Hall 10
12 May 2010	Singapore	Singapore	Singapore Indoor Stadium
14 May 2010	Bangkok	Thailand	Thunder Dome
16 May 2010	Kuala Lumpur	Malaysia	Arena of Stars (Genting Highlands)
18 May 2010	Seoul	South Korea	Olympic Gymnasium
Asia
21 May 2010	Vladivostok	Russia	FESCO-HALL
22 May 2010	Khabarovsk	Russia	Platinum Arena
Europe
25 May 2010	Yerevan	Armenia	Karen Demirchyan Complex
South Africa supported by Uriah Heep and Wishbone Ash
28 May 2010	Johannesburg	South Africa	Coca-Cola Dome
30 May 2010	Durban	South Africa	Indoor Arena, International Convention Centre
1 June 2010	Cape Town	South Africa	Grand Arena, Grandwest Casino & Entertainment World
Europe
4 June 2010	Budapest	Hungary	StarGarden Festival Open Air
5 June 2010	Zagreb	Croatia	Dom Športova
7 June 2010	Ljubljana	Slovenia	Križanke
8 June 2010	Dornbirn	Austria	Dornbirner Messe
9 June 2010	Crans-près-Céligny	Switzerland	Caribana Festival
12 June 2010	Samara	Russia	Rock nad Volgoi
28 June 2010	Belfast	Northern Ireland	St Georges Market
30 June 2010	Cork	Ireland	Live at the Marquee
3 July 2010	Sønderborg	Denmark	Mølleparken
5 July 2010	Turku	Finland	Turkuhalli
8 July 2010	Langesund	Norway	Krogshavn
9 July 2010	Sarpsborg	Norway	Kulåsparken
10 July 2010	Söderhamn	Sweden	Rockweekend (Moheds Flygfält)
12 July 2010	Argelès-sur-Mer	France	Parc de Valmy Festival les Deferlantes
14 July 2010	Lisbon	Portugal	Coliseu dos Recreios
17 July 2010	Córdoba	Spain	30º Festival de la Guitarra de Córdoba
18 July 2010	Valencia	Spain	Explanada Jardines Viveros
21 July 2010	Varese	Italy	Stadio delle Azalee Gallarate
22 July 2010	Reggio Emilia	Italy	Spazio Mirabello
23 July 2010	Arezzo	Italy	Play Arezzo Art Festival
25 July 2010	Sogliano al Rubicone	Italy	Piazza Matteotti
26 July 2010	Pescara	Italy	Stadio Adriatico
27 July 2010	Brindisi	Italy	Foro Boario Ostuni
29 July 2010	Messina	Italy	Teatro Antico Taormina
30 July 2010	Palermo	Italy	Gran Teatro Torre Roccella Campofelice di Roccella
26 October 2010	Prague	Czech Republic	Arena
27 October 2010	Olomouc	Czech Republic	Rocková Olomouc Zimní Stadion
28 October 2010	Rzeszów	Poland	Hala Podpromie
30 October 2010	Katowice	Poland	Spodek
31 October 2010	Wrocław	Poland	Hala Stulecia
3 November 2010	Marche-en-Famenne	Belgium	Wex – Wallonie Expo
5 November 2010	Lyon	France	La Halle Tony Garnier
6 November 2010	Montpellier	France	Zenith
7 November 2010	Bordeaux	France	Patinoire Meriadeck
9 November 2010	Rennes	France	Le Liberte
10 November 2010	Paris	France	Zenith
12 November 2010	Huttwil	Switzerland	Nationales Sportcenter
13 November 2010	Trier	Germany	Arena
14 November 2010	Freiburg im Breisgau	Germany	Rothaus Arena
16 November 2010	Mannheim	Germany	SAP Arena
18 November 2010	Memmingen	Germany	Eissporthalle
19 November 2010	Munich	Germany	Olympiahalle
20 November 2010	Nuremberg	Germany	Arena
22 November 2010	Berlin	Germany	Max-Schmeling-Halle
23 November 2010	Rostock	Germany	Stadthalle L
24 November 2010	Braunschweig	Germany	Volkswagenhalle
26 November 2010	Oldenburg	Germany	Weser-Ems-Halle
27 November 2010	Hamburg	Germany	Sporthalle
28 November 2010	Essen	Germany	Grugahalle
30 November 2010	Stuttgart	Germany	Schleyerhalle
1 December 2010	Strasbourg	France	Zénith Europe
2 December 2010	Dijon	France	Zénith
4 December 2010	Troyes	France	Le Cube Parc des Expos
5 December 2010	Rouen	France	Zénith
6 December 2010	Lanester	France	Parc des Expositions – Lorient
8 December 2010	Toulon	France	Zénith Omega
9 December 2010	Pau	France	Zénith
10 December 2010	Limoges	France	Zénith
12 December 2010	Tours	France	Parc des Expositions Grand Hall
13 December 2010	Lille	France	Zénith de Lille
North America
22 February 2011	Mexico City	Mexico	Mexico DF Auditorio Nacional
23 February 2011	Mexico City	Mexico	Mexico DF Auditorio Nacional
24 February 2011	Monterrey	Mexico	Monterrey Arena
27 February 2011	Guadalajara	Mexico	Guadalajara Auditorio Telmex
Europe
18 March 2011	Ekaterinburg	Russia	DIVS Arena
21 March 2011	Saint Petersburg	Russia	Ice Palace Saint Petersburg
23 March 2011	Moscow	Russia	Olympic Stadium
25 March 2011	Kyiv	Ukraine	International Exhibition Center
27 March 2011	Minsk	Belarus	Dvorets Sporta
6 May 2011	Heraklion	Greece	Pankritio Stadium
8 May 2011	Nicosia	Cyprus	Eleftheria Stadium
14 May 2011	Caesarea	Israel	Roman Amphitheatre
15 May 2011	Caesarea	Israel	Roman Amphitheatre
18 May 2011	Istanbul	Turkey	Macka Kucukciftlik
20 May 2011	Athens	Greece	Hellinikon Basketball Arena
21 May 2011	Patras	Greece	Pampeloponnisiako Stadium
23 May 2011	Thessaloniki	Greece	P.A.O.K. Sports Arena
25 May 2011	Ioannina	Greece	Castle

== Notable live dates ==
In June 2006 Deep Purple headlined the Monsters of Rock festival at Milton Keynes Bowl (UK), in front of more than 30,000 people. Two weeks later the band played at the prestigious Montreux Jazz Festival (40th anniversary). A year after that, this show was released as a Live CD and DVD, called: They All Came Down To Montreux. The Montreux 2006 show included a jam session with Claude Nobs, several jazz/funky artists and a jazz version of Deep Purple's world hit Smoke on the Water. In 2006, during the North American tour, the band played in Rock Fest Cadott, Wisconsin USA; and also participated in Musikfest Bethlehem, Pennsylvania USA, with John Kay and Steppenwolf. In July 2008, Deep Purple headlined the Montreux Jazz Festival for the second time during the Rapture of the Deep tour, the band also participated in 3 Rock Festivals in Germany.
Tickets for the band's first Israeli dates in over a decade sold out within a few days and resulted in the addition of two more dates.

During the entire Rapture of the Deep tour, Deep Purple headlined more than 30 world-known music festivals, including headlining the Monsters of Rock and the Montreux Jazz Festival twice each.

== Musicians ==
Deep Purple is nowadays touring and recording as the MK VIII line-up. The band comprises:

- Ian Gillan – vocals
- Steve Morse – guitars
- Roger Glover – bass
- Ian Paice – drums
- Don Airey – keyboards

In 2011, Roger Glover had to leave the band for a few weeks for personal reasons. During the shows in Cyprus, Greece, Israel and Turkey the bass parts were played by bassist Nick Fyffe.

== Typical set-lists ==
During the tour, the band played 7 songs from the new album Rapture of the Deep: "Wrong Man", "Rapture of the Deep", "Back to Back", "Kiss Tomorrow Goodbye", "Junkyard Blues", "Before Time Began" and "Things I Never Said". "The Well-Dressed Guitar", which has been release on the "Tour Edition" is an outtake from the Bananas sessions and has been played live since 2001. Several old songs never played live before were also included in the setlists during the tour, such as "Hard Lovin' Man", "Living Wreck", "Loosen My Strings", "Not Responsible" and "Wasted Sunsets".

Europe I and South America I 2006
1. "Pictures of Home" (from Machine Head)
2. "Things I Never Said" (from Rapture of the Deep)
3. "Wrong Man" (from Rapture of the Deep)
4. "Ted the Mechanic" (from Purpendicular)
5. "Living Wreck" (from Deep Purple in Rock)
6. "Rapture of the Deep" (from Rapture of the Deep)
7. "Back to Back" (from Rapture of the Deep) or "Mary Long" (from Who Do We Think We Are) (not on every show, sometimes played after "Before Time Began")
8. "Before Time Began" (from Rapture of the Deep)
9. "Contact Lost" (from Bananas)
10. Steve Morse guitar solo
11. "The Well-Dressed Guitar" (from Rapture of the Deep – Tour Edition)
12. "Lazy" (from Machine Head)
13. Don Airey keyboard solo
14. "Perfect Strangers" (from Perfect Strangers)
15. "Junkyard Blues" (from Rapture of the Deep) (not on every show)
16. "Kiss Tomorrow Goodbye" (from Rapture of the Deep) or "Sometimes I Feel Like Screaming" (from Purpendicular)
17. "Space Truckin'" (from Machine Head)
18. "Highway Star" (from Machine Head)
19. "Smoke on the Water" (from Machine Head)

Encore :

20. "Speed King" (from Deep Purple in Rock) or "Hush" (from Shades of Deep Purple) (with Ian Paice drum solo) or "Kiss Tomorrow Goodbye" (from Rapture of the Deep)
21. Roger Glover bass solo
22. "Black Night" (from Deep Purple in Rock)
Oceania I 2006
1. "Pictures of Home" (from Machine Head)
2. "Things I Never Said" (from Rapture of the Deep)
3. "Wrong Man" (from Rapture of the Deep)
4. "Ted the Mechanic" (from Purpendicular)
5. "Mary Long" (from Who Do We Think We Are)
6. "Rapture of the Deep" (from Rapture of the Deep)
7. "Kiss Tomorrow Goodbye" (from Rapture of the Deep)
8. "Contact Lost" (from Bananas)
9. Steve Morse guitar solo
10. "The Well-Dressed Guitar" (from Rapture of the Deep – Tour Edition)
11. "Lazy" (from Machine Head)
12. Don Airey keyboard solo
13. "Perfect Strangers" (from Perfect Strangers)
14. "Space Truckin'" (from Machine Head)
15. "Highway Star" (from Machine Head)
16. "Smoke on the Water" (from Machine Head)

Encore :

17. "Hush" (from Shades of Deep Purple) (with Ian Paice drum solo)
18. Roger Glover bass solo
19. "Black Night" (from Deep Purple in Rock)
Asia 2006
1. "Pictures of Home" (from Machine Head)
2. "Things I Never Said" (from Rapture of the Deep)
3. "Wrong Man" (from Rapture of the Deep)
4. "Strange Kind of Woman" (from Fireball)
5. "Rapture of the Deep" or "Before Time Began" (from Rapture of the Deep)
6. "Fireball" (from Fireball)
7. "Contact Lost" (from Bananas)
8. Steve Morse guitar solo
9. "The Well-Dressed Guitar" (from Rapture of the Deep – Tour Edition)
10. "Lazy" (from Machine Head)
11. "Sometimes I Feel Like Screaming" (from Purpendicular) (not on every show)
12. "Kiss Tomorrow Goodbye" (from Rapture of the Deep)
13. Don Airey keyboard solo
14. "Perfect Strangers" (from Perfect Strangers)
15. "Space Truckin'" (from Machine Head)
16. "Highway Star" (from Machine Head)
17. "Smoke on the Water" (from Machine Head)

Encore :

18. "Hush" (from Shades of Deep Purple) (with Ian Paice drum solo)
19. Roger Glover bass solo
20. "Black Night" (from Deep Purple in Rock)
Europe II 2006

The setlist changed a lot during this leg of the tour. The following setlist is inspired by the one from the Montreux Jazz Festival. The band also played "Fireball" several times.

1. "Pictures of Home" (from Machine Head)
2. "Things I Never Said" (from Rapture of the Deep)
3. "Strange Kind of Woman" (from Fireball)
4. "Rapture of the Deep" (from Rapture of the Deep)
5. "Wrong Man" (from Rapture of the Deep)
6. "Contact Lost" (from Bananas) (not on every show)
7. Steve Morse guitar solo
8. "The Well-Dressed Guitar" (from Rapture of the Deep – Tour Edition)
9. "Kiss Tomorrow Goodbye" (from Rapture of the Deep)
10. "When A Blind Man Cries" (from Machine Head)
11. "Lazy" (from Machine Head)
12. Don Airey keyboard solo
13. "Perfect Strangers" (from Perfect Strangers)
14. "Space Truckin'" (from Machine Head)
15. "Highway Star" (from Machine Head)
16. "Smoke on the Water" (from Machine Head)

Encore :

17. "Hush" (from Shades of Deep Purple) (with Ian Paice drum solo)
18. "Too Much Fun" (new song) (not on every show)
19. Roger Glover bass solo
20. "Black Night" (from Deep Purple in Rock)
Europe III, South America II and India 2006
1. "Pictures of Home" (from Machine Head)
2. "Things I Never Said" (from Rapture of the Deep)
3. "Into The Fire" (from Deep Purple in Rock)
4. "Strange Kind of Woman" (from Fireball)
5. "Rapture of the Deep" (from Rapture of the Deep)
6. "Fireball" (from Fireball)
7. "Wrong Man" (from Rapture of the Deep)
8. Steve Morse guitar solo
9. "The Well-Dressed Guitar" (from Rapture of the Deep – Tour Edition)
10. "Kiss Tomorrow Goodbye" (from Rapture of the Deep)
11. "When A Blind Man Cries" (from Machine Head)
12. "Lazy" (from Machine Head)
13. Don Airey keyboard solo
14. "Perfect Strangers" (from Perfect Strangers)
15. "Space Truckin'" (from Machine Head)
16. "Highway Star" (from Machine Head)
17. "Smoke on the Water" (from Machine Head)

Encore :

18. "Hush" (from Shades of Deep Purple) (with Ian Paice drum solo)
19. Roger Glover bass solo
20. "Black Night" (from Deep Purple in Rock)
Europe IV 2007
1. "Pictures of Home" (from Machine Head)
2. "Things I Never Said" (from Rapture of the Deep)
3. "Into The Fire" (from Deep Purple in Rock)
4. "Strange Kind of Woman" (from Fireball)
5. "Rapture of the Deep" (from Rapture of the Deep)
6. "Fireball" (from Fireball)
7. Steve Morse guitar solo
8. "The Well-Dressed Guitar" (from Rapture of the Deep – Tour Edition)
9. "When A Blind Man Cries" (from Machine Head)
10. "Lazy" (from Machine Head)
11. "The Battle Rages On" (from The Battle Rages On...)
12. Don Airey keyboard solo
13. "Perfect Strangers" (from Perfect Strangers)
14. "Space Truckin'" (from Machine Head)
15. "Highway Star" (from Machine Head)
16. "Smoke on the Water" (from Machine Head)

Encore :

17. "Hush" (from Shades of Deep Purple) (with Ian Paice drum solo)
18. Roger Glover bass solo
19. "Black Night" (from Deep Purple in Rock)
North America 2007
1. "Pictures of Home" (from Machine Head)
2. "Things I Never Said" (from Rapture of the Deep)
3. "Into The Fire" (from Deep Purple in Rock)
4. "Strange Kind of Woman" (from Fireball)
5. "Rapture of the Deep" (from Rapture of the Deep)
6. "Fireball" (from Fireball) or "Woman From Tokyo" (from Who Do We Think We Are) or "Kiss Tomorrow Goodbye" (from Rapture of the Deep)
7. "Contact Lost" (from Bananas) (not on every show)
8. Steve Morse guitar solo
9. "The Well-Dressed Guitar" (from Rapture of the Deep – Tour Edition)
10. "When A Blind Man Cries" (from Machine Head)
11. "Lazy" (from Machine Head)
12. "Knocking at Your Back Door" (from Perfect Strangers)
13. Don Airey keyboard solo
14. "Perfect Strangers" (from Perfect Strangers)
15. "Space Truckin'" (from Machine Head)
16. "Highway Star" (from Machine Head)
17. "Smoke on the Water" (from Machine Head)

Encore :

18. "Hush" (from Shades of Deep Purple) (with Ian Paice drum solo)
19. Roger Glover bass solo
20. "Black Night" (from Deep Purple in Rock)
Europe V 2007 and Latin America 2008
1. "Pictures of Home" (from Machine Head)
2. "Things I Never Said" (from Rapture of the Deep)
3. "Into The Fire" (from Deep Purple in Rock)
4. "Strange Kind of Woman" (from Fireball)
5. "Rapture of the Deep" (from Rapture of the Deep)
6. "Mary Long" or "Woman From Tokyo" (from Who Do We Think We Are)
7. "Kiss Tomorrow Goodbye" (from Rapture of the Deep)
8. "Contact Lost" (from Bananas)
9. Steve Morse guitar solo
10. "The Well-Dressed Guitar" (from Rapture of the Deep – Tour Edition)
11. "The Battle Rages On" (from The Battle Rages On...) or "Knocking at Your Back Door" (from Perfect Strangers)
12. "Lazy" (from Machine Head)
13. "Loosen My Strings" (from Purpendicular) (only Europe 2007, not on every show)
14. Don Airey keyboard solo
15. "Perfect Strangers" (from Perfect Strangers)
16. "Space Truckin'" (from Machine Head)
17. "Highway Star" (from Machine Head)
18. "Smoke on the Water" (from Machine Head)

Encore :

19. "Speed King" (from Deep Purple in Rock) (only in Varese, Italy)
20. "Hush" (from Shades of Deep Purple) (with Ian Paice drum solo)
21. Roger Glover bass solo
22. "Black Night" (from Deep Purple in Rock)
Europe VI 2008
1. "Fireball" (from Fireball)
2. "Into The Fire" (from Deep Purple in Rock)
3. "Strange Kind of Woman" (from Fireball)
4. "Rapture of the Deep" (from Rapture of the Deep)
5. "Mary Long" (from Who Do We Think We Are)
6. "Kiss Tomorrow Goodbye" (from Rapture of the Deep)
7. "Contact Lost" (from Bananas)
8. Steve Morse guitar solo
9. "Sometimes I Feel Like Screaming" (from Purpendicular)
10. "Wring That Neck" (from The Book of Taliesyn)
11. "The Well-Dressed Guitar" (from Rapture of the Deep – Tour Edition)
12. "The Battle Rages On" (from The Battle Rages On...)
13. "Demon's Eye" (from Fireball) (not on every show)
14. Don Airey keyboard solo
15. "Perfect Strangers" (from Perfect Strangers)
16. "Space Truckin'" (from Machine Head)
17. "Highway Star" (from Machine Head)
18. "Smoke on the Water" (from Machine Head)

Encore :

19. "Speed King" (from Deep Purple in Rock) (not on every show)
20. "Hush" (from Shades of Deep Purple) (with Ian Paice drum solo)
21. Roger Glover bass solo
22. "Black Night" (from Deep Purple in Rock)
Middle East 2008
1. "Pictures of Home" (from Machine Head)
2. "Things I Never Said" (from Rapture of the Deep)
3. "Into The Fire" (from Deep Purple in Rock)
4. "Strange Kind of Woman" (from Fireball)
5. "Rapture of the Deep" (from Rapture of the Deep)
6. "Contact Lost" (from Bananas)
7. Steve Morse guitar solo
8. "The Well-Dressed Guitar" (from Rapture of the Deep – Tour Edition)
9. "Sometimes I Feel Like Screaming" (from Purpendicular) or "When A Blind Man Cries" (from Machine Head)
10. "Wring That Neck" (from The Book of Taliesyn) or "Fireball" (from Fireball)
11. "The Battle Rages On" (from The Battle Rages On...) or "Lazy" (from Machine Head)
12. Don Airey keyboard solo
13. "Perfect Strangers" (from Perfect Strangers)
14. "Space Truckin'" (from Machine Head)
15. "Highway Star" (from Machine Head)
16. "Smoke on the Water" (from Machine Head)

Encore :

16. "Hush" (from Shades of Deep Purple) (with Ian Paice drum solo)
17. Roger Glover bass solo
18. "Black Night" (from Deep Purple in Rock)
Europe VII 2008
1. "Pictures of Home" (from Machine Head)
2. "Things I Never Said" (from Rapture of the Deep)
3. "Into The Fire" (from Deep Purple in Rock)
4. "Strange Kind of Woman" (from Fireball)
5. "Rapture of the Deep" (from Rapture of the Deep)
6. "Contact Lost" (from Bananas)
7. Steve Morse guitar solo
8. "The Well-Dressed Guitar" (from Rapture of the Deep – Tour Edition)
9. "Mary Long" (from Who Do We Think We Are) or "Knocking at Your Back Door" (from Perfect Strangers)
10. "Sometimes I Feel Like Screaming" (from Purpendicular)
11. "Wring That Neck" (from The Book of Taliesyn)
12. "The Battle Rages On" (from The Battle Rages On...)
13. Don Airey keyboard solo
14. "Perfect Strangers" (from Perfect Strangers)
15. "Space Truckin'" (from Machine Head)
16. "Highway Star" (from Machine Head)
17. "Smoke on the Water" (from Machine Head)

Encore :

18. "Hush" (from Shades of Deep Purple) (with Ian Paice drum solo)
19. Roger Glover bass solo
20. "Black Night" (from Deep Purple in Rock)
South America III and Japan 2009
1. "Highway Star" (from Machine Head)
2. "Things I Never Said" (from Rapture of the Deep)
3. "Into The Fire" (from Deep Purple in Rock)
4. "Strange Kind of Woman" (from Fireball)
5. "Mary Long" (from Who Do We Think We Are) (played after "Rapture of the Deep" in Japan)
6. "Rapture of the Deep" (from Rapture of the Deep)
7. "Contact Lost" (from Bananas)
8. Steve Morse guitar solo
9. "The Well-Dressed Guitar" (from Rapture of the Deep – Tour Edition) (played after "Sometimes I Feel Like Screaming" in Japan)
10. "Sometimes I Feel Like Screaming" (from Purpendicular)
11. "Wring That Neck" (from The Book of Taliesyn)
12. "The Battle Rages On" (from The Battle Rages On...)
13. Don Airey keyboard solo
14. "Perfect Strangers" (from Perfect Strangers)
15. "Space Truckin'" (from Machine Head)
16. "Smoke on the Water" (from Machine Head)

Encore :

17. "Hush" (from Shades of Deep Purple) (with Ian Paice drum solo)
18. Roger Glover bass solo
19. "Black Night" (from Deep Purple in Rock)
Europe VIII 2009
1. "Highway Star" (from Machine Head)
2. "Things I Never Said" (from Rapture of the Deep)
3. "Wrong Man" (from Rapture of the Deep) or "Not Responsible" (from Perfect Strangers) or "Maybe I'm A Leo" (from Machine Head) or "Bloodsucker" (from Deep Purple in Rock)
4. "Strange Kind of Woman" (from Fireball)
5. "Wasted Sunsets" (from Perfect Strangers) (not on every show)
6. "Rapture of the Deep" (from Rapture of the Deep)
7. "Fireball" (from Fireball)
8. "Contact Lost" (from Bananas)
9. Steve Morse guitar solo
10. "Sometimes I Feel Like Screaming" (from Purpendicular)
11. "The Well-Dressed Guitar" (from Rapture of the Deep – Tour Edition)
12. "Knocking at Your Back Door" (from Perfect Strangers) or "Pictures of Home" (from Machine Head) (not on every show)
13. "Wring That Neck" (from The Book of Taliesyn) or "Lazy" (from Machine Head)
14. "The Battle Rages On" (from The Battle Rages On...) or "No One Came" (from Fireball)
15. Don Airey keyboard solo
16. "Perfect Strangers" (from Perfect Strangers) or "The Battle Rages On" (from The Battle Rages On...)
17. "Space Truckin'" (from Machine Head)
18. "Smoke on the Water" (from Machine Head)

Encore :

19. "Hush" (from Shades of Deep Purple) (with Ian Paice drum solo)
20. Roger Glover bass solo
21. "Black Night" (from Deep Purple in Rock)
Oceania II and South Africa 2010
1. "Highway Star" (from Machine Head)
2. "Things I Never Said" (from Rapture of the Deep)
3. "Strange Kind of Woman" (from Fireball)
4. "Wasted Sunsets" (from Perfect Strangers) or "Maybe I'm A Leo" (from Machine Head)
5. "Rapture of the Deep" (from Rapture of the Deep)
6. "Fireball" (from Fireball)
7. "Contact Lost" (from Bananas)
8. Steve Morse guitar solo
9. "Sometimes I Feel Like Screaming" (from Purpendicular)
10. "The Well-Dressed Guitar" (from Rapture of the Deep – Tour Edition)
11. "Mary Long" (from Who Do We Think We Are) or "Wrong Man" (from Rapture of the Deep)
12. "Lazy" (from Machine Head)
13. "No One Came" (from Fireball)
14. Don Airey keyboard solo
15. "The Battle Rages On" (from The Battle Rages On...)
16. "Space Truckin'" (from Machine Head)
17. "Smoke on the Water" (from Machine Head)

Encore :

18. "Hush" (from Shades of Deep Purple) (with Ian Paice drum solo)
19. Roger Glover bass solo
20. "Black Night" (from Deep Purple in Rock)
Europe IX 2010
1. "Hard Lovin' Man" (from Deep Purple in Rock)
2. "Things I Never Said" (from Rapture of the Deep)

or

1. "Highway Star" (from Machine Head)
2. "Hard Lovin' Man" (from Deep Purple in Rock)
3. "Maybe I'm A Leo" (from Machine Head)
4. "Strange Kind of Woman" (from Fireball)
5. "Rapture of the Deep" (from Rapture of the Deep)
6. "Fireball" (from Fireball)
7. "Silver Tongue" (from Bananas)
8. "Contact Lost" (from Bananas)
9. Steve Morse guitar solo
10. "When A Blind Man Cries" (from Machine Head)
11. "The Well-Dressed Guitar" (from Rapture of the Deep – Tour Edition)
12. "Almost Human" (from Abandon)
13. "Lazy" (from Machine Head)
14. "No One Came" (from Fireball)
15. Don Airey keyboard solo
16. "Perfect Strangers" (from Perfect Strangers)
17. "Space Truckin'" (from Machine Head)
18. "Smoke on the Water" (from Machine Head)

Encore :

19. "Hush" (from Shades of Deep Purple) (with Ian Paice drum solo)
20. Roger Glover bass solo
21. "Black Night" (from Deep Purple in Rock)

== Opening acts ==
- The Answer (London Astoria, 17 January 2006)
- Thin Lizzy and Styx (British tour April/May 2007)
- Edgar Winter (North American tour)
- Steppenwolf (North American tour)
- Blue Öyster Cult (North American tour)
- Hamadryad (Montreal City, 28 July 2007)
- Alice Cooper (German tour dates)
- Krypteria (German tour dates)
- La Carga (Argentina, 24 March 2006)
- Yngwie Malmsteen Japan tour dates April 2009
- Galeej Gurus (Bangalore. December 2006)
- Status Quo (Australian tour)
- Uriah Heep (Iceland, German tour dates, South Africa 2010)
- Stella Maris (Israel Caesarea Amphitheatre tour dates)
- Peter Ron (Chile, 28 February 2008)
- Europe (Sweden, 14–15 July 2009)
- D-A-D (Gothenburg, 15 July 2009)
- The Milestones (Finland, 17 & 18 July 2008)
- SBB (Katowice, Poland, 24 February 2006, and Warsaw, Poland, 9 October 2006)
- The Crave – UK tour, November 2009
- Electric Mary – Australian tour dates, April/May 2010
- Marillion – German tour dates, November 2010
- Philip Sayce or Puggy – France tour dates, December 2010
