= The Long Goodbye Tour =

2017–19 concert tour by Deep Purple

- Tour by Deep Purple
- Location: Asia; Europe; North America; South America
- Associated album: Infinite
- Start date: 13 May 2017
- End date: 10 December 2019
- Legs: 10
- No. of shows: 170

Deep Purple concert chronology
- Now What? World Tour (2013–2015); The Long Goodbye Tour (2017–2019); Whoosh! Tour (2022–2023)

The Long Goodbye Tour was a concert tour by English hard rock band Deep Purple to support of their 20th studio album, Infinite.

== Background ==
Drummer Ian Paice suffered a minor stroke in June 2016, which affected his right hand, knuckles, thumbs and fingers. This led to some Deep Purple concerts in Scandinavia being cancelled, and were the first of the band's shows he had been forced to cancel since Deep Purple's formation in 1968.

At the time of the Long Goodbye Tour's announcement in December 2016, Paice told the Heavyworlds website it "may be the last big tour", adding that the band "don't know". He described the tour as being long in duration, and said: "We haven't made any hard, fast plans, but it becomes obvious that you cannot tour the same way you did when you were 21. It becomes more and more difficult. People have other things in their lives which take time. But never say never."

Deep Purple's studio album, Infinite, was released on 7 April 2017, and the Long Goodbye Tour serves as support for the record.

== Opening acts ==
- Europe (United Kingdom dates, 2017)
- Cats In Space (United Kingdom dates, 2017)
- Cheap Trick and Tesla (South America 2017)
- Alice Cooper (North America 2017)
- The Edgar Winter Band (North America 2017)
- Monster Truck (Europe 2017)
- Divlje jagode ft. Tony Martin and Andy LaRocque (Europe, 2017, Zagreb only)
- Tiebreaker (Europe 2017, Oslo only)
- Judas Priest (Co-headliner, North America 2018)
- In Flames (Mexico 2018)
- Joyous Wolf (United States 2019)

== Setlists ==
Europe I
1. "Time For Bedlam" (From Infinite)
2. "Fireball" (From Fireball)
3. "Bloodsucker" (From Deep Purple In Rock)
4. "Strange Kind Of Woman" (From Fireball)
5. "Johnny's Band" (From Infinite) (not on the Hellfest gig)
6. "Uncommon Man" (From Now What?!)
7. "The Surprising" (From Infinite)
8. "Lazy" (From Machine Head)
9. "Birds Of Prey" (From Infinite)
10. "Hell To Pay" (From Now What?!)
11. Don Airey Keyboard Solo
12. "Perfect Strangers" (From Perfect Strangers)
13. "Space Truckin'" (From Machine Head)
14. "Smoke On The Water" (From Machine Head)

Encore:

15. "Highway Star" (From Machine Head) (not on every show)
16. "Hush" (From Shades of Deep Purple)
17. Roger Glover Bass Solo (not on the Hellfest gig)
18. "Black Night" (From Deep Purple In Rock)
North America
1. "Highway Star" (From Machine Head)
2. "Fireball" (From Fireball)
3. "Strange Kind Of Woman" (From Fireball)
4. "Uncommon Man" (From Now What?!)
5. "Lazy" (From Machine Head)
6. "Knocking At Your Back Door" (From Perfect Strangers) (not on every show)
7. "The Surprising" (From Infinite) or "Pictures of Home" (From Machine Head)
8. Don Airey Keyboard Solo
9. "Perfect Strangers" (From Perfect Strangers)
10. "Space Truckin'" (From Machine Head)
11. "Smoke On The Water" (From Machine Head) (sometimes played after "Hush")

Encore:

12. "Time for Bedlam" (From Infinite)
13. "Hush" (From Shades of Deep Purple)
Europe II
1. "Time For Bedlam" (From Infinite)
2. "Fireball" (From Fireball)
3. "Bloodsucker" (From Deep Purple In Rock)
4. "Strange Kind Of Woman" (From Fireball) (not on the British shows)
5. "All I Got Is You" (From Infinite)
6. "Uncommon Man" (From Now What?!)
7. "The Surprising" (From Infinite)
8. "Lazy" (From Machine Head)
9. "Birds Of Prey" (From Infinite)
10. "Knocking At Your Back Door" (From Perfect Strangers)
11. Don Airey Keyboard Solo
12. "Perfect Strangers" (From Perfect Strangers)
13. "Space Truckin'" (From Machine Head)
14. "Smoke On The Water" (From Machine Head) (with Europe's John Norum on the London show)

Encore:

15. "Hush" (From Shades of Deep Purple)
16. Roger Glover Bass Solo
17. "Black Night" (From Deep Purple In Rock)
South America
1. "Highway Star" (From Machine Head)
2. "Pictures of Home" (From Machine Head)
3. "Bloodsucker" (From Deep Purple In Rock)
4. "Strange Kind of Woman" (From Fireball)
5. "Uncommon Man" (From Now What?!)
6. "Lazy" (From Machine Head)
7. "Birds Of Prey" (From Infinite)
8. "Knocking at Your Back Door" (From Perfect Strangers)
9. Don Airey Keyboard Solo
10. "Perfect Strangers" (From Perfect Strangers)
11. "Space Truckin'" (From Machine Head)
12. "Smoke On The Water" (From Machine Head)

Encore:

13. "Green Onions" (Booker T. & the M.G.'s cover, only at Hell and Heaven Metal Fest)
14. "Hush" (From Shades of Deep Purple)
15. Roger Glover Bass Solo
16. "Black Night" (From Deep Purple In Rock)
Europe III
1. "Highway Star" (From Machine Head)
2. "Pictures of Home" (From Machine Head) (played after "Bloodsucker" in Moscow)
3. "Bloodsucker" (From Deep Purple In Rock)
4. "Strange Kind of Woman" (From Fireball)
5. "Sometimes I Feel Like Screaming" (From Purpendicular)
6. "Uncommon Man" (From Now What?!)
7. "Lazy" (From Machine Head)
8. "Time For Bedlam" (From Infinite)
9. "Birds Of Prey" (From Infinite)
10. "Knocking at Your Back Door" (From Perfect Strangers) or "The Surprising" (From Infinite)
11. Don Airey Keyboard Solo
12. "Perfect Strangers" (From Perfect Strangers)
13. "Space Truckin'" (From Machine Head)
14. "Smoke On The Water" (From Machine Head)

Encore:

15. "Hush" (From Shades of Deep Purple)
16. Roger Glover Bass Solo
17. "Black Night" (From Deep Purple In Rock)
North America II
1. "Highway Star" (From Machine Head)
2. "Pictures of Home" (From Machine Head)
3. "Bloodsucker" (From Deep Purple In Rock)
4. "Strange Kind of Woman" (From Fireball)
5. "Sometimes I Feel Like Screaming" (From Purpendicular)
6. "Uncommon Man" (From Now What?!)
7. "Lazy" (From Machine Head)
8. "Knocking at Your Back Door" (From Perfect Strangers)
9. Don Airey Keyboard Solo
10. "Perfect Strangers" (From Perfect Strangers)
11. "Space Truckin'" (From Machine Head)
12. "Smoke On The Water" (From Machine Head)

Encore:

13. "Hush" (From Shades of Deep Purple)
Japan
1. "Highway Star" (From Machine Head)
2. "Pictures of Home" (From Machine Head)
3. "Bloodsucker" (From Deep Purple In Rock)
4. "Strange Kind of Woman" (From Fireball)
5. "Sometimes I Feel Like Screaming" (From Purpendicular)
6. "Uncommon Man" (From Now What?!)
7. "Lazy" (From Machine Head)
8. "The Surprising" (From Infinite)
9. "Time For Bedlam" (From Infinite)
10. "Birds Of Prey" (From Infinite)
11. Don Airey Keyboard Solo
12. "Perfect Strangers" (From Perfect Strangers)
13. "Space Truckin'" (From Machine Head)
14. "Smoke On The Water" (From Machine Head)

Encore:

15. "Hush" (From Shades of Deep Purple)
16. "Black Night" (From Deep Purple In Rock)
Mexico
1. "Highway Star" (From Machine Head)
2. "Pictures of Home" (From Machine Head)
3. "Bloodsucker" (From Deep Purple In Rock)
4. "Demon's Eye" or "Strange Kind of Woman" (From Fireball)
5. "Sometimes I Feel Like Screaming" (From Purpendicular)
6. "Uncommon Man" (From Now What?!)
7. "Lazy" (From Machine Head)
8. "The Surprising" (From Infinite)
9. "Time For Bedlam" (From Infinite)
10. "Birds Of Prey" (From Infinite)
11. Don Airey Keyboard Solo
12. "Perfect Strangers" (From Perfect Strangers)
13. "Space Truckin'" (From Machine Head)
14. "Smoke On The Water" (From Machine Head)

Encore:

15. "Hush" (From Shades of Deep Purple)
16. "Black Night" (From Deep Purple In Rock)
United States
1. "Highway Star" (From Machine Head)
2. "Pictures of Home" (From Machine Head)
3. "Bloodsucker" (From Deep Purple In Rock)
4. "Demon's Eye" (From Fireball)
5. "Sometimes I Feel Like Screaming" (From Purpendicular)
6. "Uncommon Man" (From Now What?!)
7. "Lazy" (From Machine Head)
8. "Time For Bedlam" (From Infinite)
9. Don Airey Keyboard Solo
10. "Perfect Strangers" (From Perfect Strangers)
11. "Space Truckin'" (From Machine Head)
12. "Smoke On The Water" (From Machine Head)

Encore:

13. "Hush" (From Shades of Deep Purple)
14. "Black Night" (From Deep Purple In Rock)
Europe IV
1. "Highway Star" (From Machine Head)
2. "Pictures of Home" (From Machine Head)
3. "Bloodsucker" (From Deep Purple In Rock)
4. "Demon's Eye" (From Fireball)
5. "Sometimes I Feel Like Screaming" (From Purpendicular)
6. "Uncommon Man" (From Now What?!)
7. "Lazy" (From Machine Head)
8. "Time For Bedlam" (From Infinite)
9. Don Airey Keyboard Solo
10. "Perfect Strangers" (From Perfect Strangers)
11. "Space Truckin'" (From Machine Head)
12. "Smoke On The Water" (From Machine Head)

Encore:

13. "Hush" (From Shades of Deep Purple)
14. "Black Night" (From Deep Purple In Rock)

== Tour dates ==
| Date | City | Country | Venue | Attendance | Box office |
Europe
| 13 May 2017 | Bucharest | Romania | Romexpo | — | — |
| 14 May 2017 | Sofia | Bulgaria | Arena Armeec | — | — |
| 16 May 2017 | Zagreb | Croatia | Zagreb Arena | — | — |
| 17 May 2017 | Vienna | Austria | Stadthalle | — | — |
| 19 May 2017 | Munich | Germany | Olympiahalle | — | — |
| 20 May 2017 | Geneva | Switzerland | SEG Geneva Arena | — | — |
| 22 May 2017 | Prague | Czech Republic | O2 Arena | — | — |
| 23 May 2017 | Łódź | Poland | Atlas Arena | — | — |
| 24 May 2017 | Katowice | Poland | Spodek | — | — |
| 27 May 2017 | Esch-Alzette | Luxembourg | Rockhal | — | — |
| 30 May 2017 | Hamburg | Germany | Barclaycard Arena | — | — |
| 1 June 2017 | Lille | France | Le Zénith | — | — |
| 2 June 2017 | Amsterdam | Netherlands | Ziggo Dome | — | — |
| 3 June 2017 | Paris | France | AccorHotels Arena | — | — |
| 6 June 2017 | Cologne | Germany | Lanxess Arena | — | — |
| 7 June 2017 | Dortmund | Germany | Westfalenhallen 1 | — | — |
| 9 June 2017 | Leipzig | Germany | Arena Leipzig | — | — |
| 10 June 2017 | Frankfurt | Germany | Festhalle Frankfurt | — | — |
| 13 June 2017 | Berlin | Germany | Mercedes-Benz Arena | 7,223 / 9,299 | $464,820 |
| 14 June 2017 | Stuttgart | Germany | Hanns-Martin-Schleyer-Halle | — | — |
| 16 June 2017 | Clisson | France | Hellfest | —N/a | —N/a |
| 17 June 2017 | Dessel | Belgium | Graspop Metal Meeting | —N/a | —N/a |
| 22 June 2017 | Rome | Italy | PalaLottomatica | — | — |
| 24 June 2017 | Hinwil | Switzerland | Rock the Ring | —N/a | —N/a |
| 26 June 2017 | Casalecchio di Reno | Italy | Unipol Arena | — | — |
| 27 June 2017 | Assago | Italy | Mediolanum Forum | — | — |
| 28 June 2017 | Monte Carlo | Monaco | Salle des Etoiles | — | — |
| 30 June 2017 | Bilbao | Spain | Bizkaia Arena | — | — |
| 1 July 2017 | Barcelona | Spain | Barcelona Rock Fest | —N/a | —N/a |
| 3 July 2017 | Madrid | Spain | Barclaycard Center | — | — |
| 4 July 2017 | Lisbon | Portugal | MEO Arena | — | — |
North America
| 12 August 2017 | Las Vegas | United States | The Chelsea | — | — |
| 13 August 2017 | Los Angeles | United States | Greek Theatre | 5,394 / 5,851 | $431,452 |
| 15 August 2017 | Phoenix | United States | Ak-Chin Pavilion | 3,017 / 19,107 | $133,121 |
| 16 August 2017 | Albuquerque | United States | Isleta Amphitheater | 3,143 / 15,051 | $110,465 |
| 18 August 2017 | The Woodlands | United States | Cynthia Woods Mitchell Pavilion | 5,432 / 15,858 | $231,326 |
| 19 August 2017 | Dallas | United States | Starplex Pavilion | 4,816 / 19,800 | $179,554 |
| 21 August 2017 | Atlanta | United States | Chastain Park Amphitheater | 3,767 / 6,700 | $218,336 |
| 23 August 2017 | Bristow | United States | Jiffy Lube Live | 4,678 / 22,583 | $238,641 |
| 24 August 2017 | Camden | United States | BB&T Pavilion | 6,085 / 24,841 | $199,194 |
| 26 August 2017 | Wantagh | United States | Jones Beach Theater | 6,740 / 13,673 | $328,608 |
| 27 August 2017 | Mansfield | United States | Xfinity Center | 7,783 / 13,763 | $397,358 |
| 28 August 2017 | Holmdel | United States | PNC Bank Arts Center | 5,783 / 16,401 | $234,754 |
| 30 August 2017 | Noblesville | United States | Klipsch Music Center | 4,237 / 23,808 | $180,770 |
| 1 September 2017 | Burgettstown | United States | KeyBank Pavilion | 4,889 / 22,939 | $181,954 |
| 2 September 2017 | Toronto | Canada | Budweiser Stage | — | — |
| 3 September 2017 | Clarkston | United States | DTE Energy Music Theatre | 10,584 / 14,919 | $437,987 |
| 6 September 2017 | Tinley Park | United States | Hollywood Casino Amphitheater | 5,642 / 11,897 | $236,966 |
| 8 September 2017 | Maryland Heights | United States | Hollywood Casino Amphitheater | 7,122 / 19,000 | $230,777 |
| 9 September 2017 | Cuyahoga Falls | United States | Blossom Music Center | 6,204 / 20,826 | $263,952 |
| 10 September 2017 | Cincinnati | United States | Riverbend Music Center | — | — |
Europe
| 6 November 2017 | Stockholm | Sweden | Annexet | — | — |
| 8 November 2017 | Trondheim | Norway | Trondheim Spektrum | — | — |
| 9 November 2017 | Oslo | Norway | Oslo Spektrum | — | — |
| 11 November 2017 | Helsinki | Finland | Jaahalli | — | — |
| 13 November 2017 | Copenhagen | Denmark | Valby Hallen | — | — |
| 17 November 2017 | Birmingham | England | Barclaycard Arena | — | — |
| 18 November 2017 | Manchester | England | Manchester Arena | 8,100 / 8,561 | $550,880 |
| 20 November 2017 | Cardiff | Wales | Motorpoint Arena Cardiff | — | — |
| 22 November 2017 | Glasgow | Scotland | SSE Hydro | — | — |
| 23 November 2017 | London | England | The O_{2} Arena | 11,138 / 12,269 | $824,427 |
Latin America
| 6 December 2017 | Buenos Aires | Argentina | Tecnópolis | 6,797 / 11,500 | $488,731 |
| 8 December 2017 | Santiago | Chile | Movistar Arena | 8,022 / 14,974 | $444,458 |
| 12 December 2017 (Note: The 12 December 2017 concert at the Pedreira Paulo Leminski in Curitiba was part of the Solid Rock Festival.) | Curitiba | Brazil | Pedreira Paulo Leminski | —N/a | —N/a |
| 13 December 2017 (Note: The 13 December 2017 concert at the Allianz Parque in São Paulo was part of the Solid Rock Festival.) | São Paulo | Brazil | Allianz Parque | —N/a | —N/a |
| 15 December 2017 (Note: The 15 December 2017 concert at the Jeunesse Arena in Rio de Janeiro was part of the Solid Rock Festival.) | Rio de Janeiro | Brazil | Jeunesse Arena | —N/a | —N/a |
| 4 May 2018 (Note: The 4 May 2018 concert at the Autódromo Hermanos Rodríguez in Mexico City was part of the Hell & Heaven Metal Fest.) | Mexico City | Mexico | Autódromo Hermanos Rodríguez | —N/a | —N/a |
Europe
| 30 May 2018 | Moscow | Russia | Olympijsky | — | — |
| 1 June 2018 | St. Petersburg | Russia | Ledovy Dvorets | — | — |
| 3 June 2018 | Riga | Latvia | Arēna Rīga | — | — |
| 6 June 2018 | Kyiv | Ukraine | Palace of Sports | — | — |
| 9 June 2018 | Tallinn | Estonia | Saku Suurhall | — | — |
| 1 July 2018 | Kraków | Poland | Tauron Arena Kraków | — | — |
| 2 July 2018 | Brno | Czech Republic | DRFG Arena | — | — |
| 6 July 2018 | Albi | France | Festival Pause Guitare | —N/a | —N/a |
| 8 July 2018 | Monchengladbach | Germany | Monchengladbach Sports Arena | — | — |
| 9 July 2018 | Verona | Italy | Arena di Verona | — | — |
| 11 July 2018 | Turin | Italy | Palazzina di Caccia di Stupinigi | — | — |
| 13 July 2018 | Aix-les-Bains | France | Musillac Festival | — | — |
| 14 July 2018 | Tours | France | American Tours Festival | —N/a | —N/a |
| 16 July 2018 | Saint-Malô-du-Bois | France | Sparkassen Park | — | — |
| 20 July 2018 | Hamina | Finland | Bastion | — | — |
| 21 July 2018 | Tammisari | Finland | Stallorsparken | — | — |
| 23 July 2018 | Rattvik | Sweden | Dalhalla | — | — |
North America
| 21 August 2018 | Cincinnati | United States | Riverbend Music Center | — | — |
| 22 August 2018 | Tinley Park | United States | Hollywood Casino Amphitheatre | — | — |
| 24 August 2018 | Detroit | United States | Michigan Lottery Amphitheatre at Freedom Hill | — | — |
| 25 August 2018 | Mount Pleasant | United States | Soaring Eagle Casino & Resort | — | — |
| 27 August 2018 | Hamilton | Canada | FirstOntario Centre | — | — |
| 29 August 2018 | Montréal | Canada | Bell Centre | — | — |
| 30 August 2018 | Québec City | Canada | Videotron Centre | — | — |
| 1 September 2018 | Wantagh | United States | Northwell Health at Jones Beach Theater | — | — |
| 2 September 2018 | Bethel | United States | Bethel Woods Center for the Arts | — | — |
| 5 September 2018 | Darien | United States | Darien Lake Performing Arts Center | — | — |
| 6 September 2018 | Holmdel | United States | PNC Bank Arts Center | — | — |
| 8 September 2018 | Virginia Beach | United States | Veterans United Home Loans Amphitheater at Virginia Beach | — | — |
| 9 September 2018 | Camden | United States | BB&T Pavilion | — | — |
| 11 September 2018 | Charlotte | United States | PNC Music Pavilion | — | — |
| 12 September 2018 | Jacksonville | United States | Daily's Place | — | — |
| 14 September 2018 | Atlanta | United States | Verizon Wireless Amphitheatre at Encore Park | — | — |
| 16 September 2018 | Biloxi | United States | Mississippi Coast Coliseum | — | — |
| 18 September 2018 | Kansas City | United States | Starlight Theatre | — | — |
| 20 September 2018 | Welch | United States | Treasure Island Hotel and Casino | — | — |
| 21 September 2018 | Council Bluffs | United States | Harrah's Council Bluffs | — | — |
| 23 September 2018 | Denver | United States | Pepsi Center | — | — |
| 26 September 2018 | Chula Vista | United States | Mattress Firm Amphitheatre | — | — |
| 27 September 2018 | Irvine | United States | FivePoint Amphitheatre | — | — |
| 29 September 2018 | Mountain View | United States | Shoreline Amphitheatre | — | — |
| 30 September 2018 | Wheatland | United States | Toyota Amphitheatre | — | — |
Japan
| 14 October 2018 | Chiba | Japan | Makuhari Messe Hall | — | — |
| 15 October 2018 | Nagoya | Japan | Century Hall | — | — |
| 17 October 2018 | Osaka | Japan | Osaka Festival Hall | — | — |
| 18 October 2018 | Osaka | Japan | Osaka Festival Hall | — | — |
| 20 October 2018 | Hiroshima | Japan | Ueno Gakuen Hall | — | — |
| 22 October 2018 | Fukuoka | Japan | Fukuoka Sunpalace | — | — |
Mexico
| 9 November 2018 | Monterrey | Mexico | Auditorio Banamex | — | — |
| 11 November 2018 | San Luis Potosí | Mexico | Parque de Baseball | — | — |
| 13 November 2018 | Leon | Mexico | Poliforum | — | — |
| 15 November 2018 | Guadalajara | Mexico | Calle 2 | — | — |
| 17 November 2018 | Mexico City | Mexico | Arena Ciudad de Mexico | — | — |
United States
| 3 September 2019 | Riverside | United States | Fox Performing Arts Center | — | — |
| 4 September 2019 | Los Angeles | United States | The Wiltern | — | — |
| 6 September 2019 | Temecula | United States | Pechanga Resort and Casino | — | — |
| 7 September 2019 | Murphys | United States | Ironstone Amphitheatre | — | — |
| 8 September 2019 | San Francisco | United States | Warfield | — | — |
| 10 September 2019 | Portland | United States | Keller Auditorium | — | — |
| 11 September 2019 | Seattle | United States | Paramount Theatre | — | — |
| 13 September 2019 | Reno | United States | Grand Sierra Resort | — | — |
| 14 September 2019 | Las Vegas | United States | House of Blues | — | — |
| 15 September 2019 | Salt Lake City | United States | Delta Hall | — | — |
| 17 September 2019 | Denver | United States | Paramount Theatre | — | — |
| 19 September 2019 | Kansas City | United States | Uptown Theatre | — | — |
| 20 September 2019 | Shawnee | United States | Firelake Arena | — | — |
| 21 September 2019 | Tulsa | United States | The Joint | — | — |
| 23 September 2019 | Houston | United States | Revention Music Center | — | — |
| 24 September 2019 | New Orleans | United States | Saenger Theatre | — | — |
| 26 September 2019 | Orlando | United States | Dr. Philips Center for the Performing Arts | — | — |
| 27 September 2019 | St. Petersburg | United States | Mahaffey Theatre | — | — |
| 29 September 2019 | Atlanta | United States | Coca-Cola Roxy | — | — |
| 30 September 2019 | Nashville | United States | Andrew Jackson Hall | — | — |
| 2 October 2019 | Washington DC | United States | Warner Theatre | — | — |
| 4 October 2019 | Monticello | United States | Resorts World Catskills Epicenter | — | — |
| 5 October 2019 | Boston | United States | Orpheum Theatre | — | — |
| 6 October 2019 | Portland | United States | Merrill Auditorium | — | — |
| 8 October 2019 | New York City | United States | Beacon Theatre | — | — |
| 9 October 2019 | Uncasville | United States | Mohegan Sun Arena | — | — |
| 10 October 2019 | Upper Darby | United States | Tower Theatre | — | — |
| 12 October 2019 | Indianapolis | United States | Murat Theatre | — | — |
| 13 October 2019 | Milwaukee | United States | Riverside Theatre | — | — |
| 15 October 2019 | Detroit | United States | Fox Theatre | — | — |
| 16 October 2019 | Northfield | United States | MGM Northfield Park | — | — |
| 18 October 2019 | Rosemont | United States | Rosemont Theatre | — | — |
| 19 October 2019 | Minneapolis | United States | Armory | — | — |
Europe
| 1 December 2019 | Klagenfurt | Austria | Messe Halle | — | — |
| 3 December 2019 | Kraków | Poland | Tauron Arena | — | — |
| 4 December 2019 | Ostrava | Czech Republic | Ostrava Arena | — | — |
| 6 December 2019 | Belgrade | Serbia | Belgrade Arena | — | — |
| 7 December 2019 | Sofia | Bulgaria | Arena Armeec | — | — |
| 9 December 2019 | Budapest | Hungary | Hungary Arena | — | — |
| 10 December 2019 | Cluj | Romania | Sala Polivalenta | — | — |
| Total | | | | — | — |

== Personnel ==
- Ian Gillan – vocals
- Steve Morse – guitars
- Roger Glover – bass
- Ian Paice – drums
- Don Airey – keyboards
