= Live at Montreux 2006 =

2007 live release by Deep Purple

Live at Montreux 2006: They All Came Down to Montreux

Live album by Deep Purple
- Released: 12 June 2007
- Recorded: 15 July 2006 in Montreux
- Genre: Hard rock, heavy metal
- Length: 67:33
- Label: Eagle

Deep Purple live albums chronology
Live in Denmark 1972 (2007)	Live at Montreux 2006: They All Came Down to Montreux (2007)	Live at Montreux 2011 (2011)

Live at Montreux 2006: They All Came Down to Montreux

Video by Deep Purple
- Released: 12 July 2007
- Recorded: 15 July 2006 in Montreux
- Genre: Hard rock
- Length: 102:14; 58:45
- Label: Eagle Rock Entertainment

Deep Purple chronology
Classic Albums: Deep Purple – The Making of Machine Head (2002)	Live at Montreux 2006: They All Came Down to Montreux (2007)	Around the World Live (2008)

Professional ratings
Review scores
Source	Rating
AllMusic	link

Live at Montreux 2006: They All Came Down to Montreux is the first live release by English hard rock band Deep Purple's mk VIII lineup. This concert was recorded in Montreux, during 2006 Rapture of the Deep tour. Besides a DVD release, the concert film has also been released on HD DVD and Blu-ray. The CD includes four tracks from their most recent album Rapture of the Deep and seven tracks originally from the Mk II line up including six from Machine Head. The twelfth track is a Don Airey keyboard solo.

== Track listings ==
All songs written by Ritchie Blackmore, Ian Gillan, Roger Glover, Jon Lord, and Ian Paice except where noted.

=== CD track listing ===
1. "Pictures of Home" – 3:57
2. "Things I Never Said" (Gillan, Steve Morse, Glover, Don Airey, Paice) – 5:44
3. "Strange Kind of Woman" – 5:05
4. "Rapture of the Deep" (Gillan, Morse, Glover, Airey, Paice) – 5:16
5. "Wrong Man" (Gillan, Morse, Glover, Airey, Paice) – 4:25
6. "Kiss Tomorrow Goodbye" (Gillan, Morse, Glover, Airey, Paice) – 4:13
7. "When a Blind Man Cries" – 3:33
  - Credited to Gillan, Morse, Glover, Lord and Paice on this release
8. "Lazy" – 7:34
9. "Keyboard Solo" (Instrumental) (Airey, Albert Ammons, Wolfgang Amadeus Mozart) – 4:58
10. "Space Truckin'" – 4:54
11. "Highway Star" – 8:42
12. "Smoke on the Water" – 9:12

=== DVD track listing ===
DVD one
Live at Montreux 2006

1. "Pictures of Home"
2. "Things I Never Said"
3. "Strange Kind of Woman"
4. "Rapture of the Deep"
5. "Wrong Man"
6. "The Well-Dressed Guitar"
7. "Kiss Tomorrow Goodbye"
8. "When a Blind Man Cries"
9. "Lazy"
10. "Keyboard Solo" (Instrumental)
11. "Space Truckin'"
12. "Highway Star"
13. "Smoke on the Water"
14. "Hush" (with Michael Bradford)
15. "Too Much Fun" (jam) (with "Funky" Claude Nobs)
16. "Black Night"

DVD two
London Hard Rock Cafe 2006

1. "Fireball"
2. "I Got Your Number"
3. "Strange Kind of Woman"
4. "Kiss Tomorrow Goodbye"
5. "Rapture of the Deep"
6. "Wrong Man"
7. "Lazy"
8. "Perfect Strangers"
9. "Highway Star"
10. "Smoke on the Water"

==== Extras ====
- This disc includes interviews with the band

== Personnel ==
Deep Purple

- Ian Gillan – vocals, harmonica
- Steve Morse – guitars
- Roger Glover – bass
- Ian Paice – drums
- Don Airey – keyboards

with

- Michael Bradford – guitars on "Hush", "Too Much Fun" and "Black Night"
- Claude Nobs – harmonica on "Too Much Fun"
