= Giangreco =

Giangreco is an Italian surname. Notable people with the surname include:

- Camila Giangreco Campiz (born 1996), Paraguayan tennis player
- Dennis Giangreco (born 1952), American author
- Mark Giangreco (born 1952), American television sports anchor
