= The Devil to Pay =

The Devil to Pay may refer to:

- The Devil to Pay (opera), a 1731 ballad opera by Charles Coffey and John Mottley
- The Devil to Pay (1920 film), an American silent mystery film
- The Devil to Pay!, a 1930 film starring Ronald Colman and Loretta Young
- The Devil to Pay (1960 film), an industrial short starring Buster Keaton
- The Devil to Pay (2019 film), an American independent thriller film
- The Devil to Pay (play), a 1939 play by Dorothy L. Sayers
- The Devil to Pay (Ellery Queen novel), a 1938 mystery novel
- The Devil to Pay (Parkinson novel), a nautical novel by C. Northcote Parkinson, set in 1794

== See also ==
- The Devil to Pay in the Backlands, a 1956 translation of the title of a novel from Portuguese -- Grande Sertão: Veredas
- Hell to Pay (disambiguation)
