= Picture of Innocence =

Picture of Innocence may refer to:

- "Picture of Innocence", a track on the album Bananas by Deep Purple
- "Picture of Innocence", an episode from Series 10 of the British TV crime series Midsomer Murders
