= Hell to Pay =

Hell to Pay may refer to:

== Music ==
=== Albums ===
- Hell to Pay (The Jeff Healey Band album), 1990
- Hell to Pay (Dokken album), 2004

=== Songs ===
- "Hell to Pay", by The Almighty from the album Soul Destruction, 1991
- "Hell to Pay", by Deep Purple from the album Now What?!, 2013
- "Hell to Pay", by Five Finger Death Punch from the album Got Your Six, 2015
- "Hell to Pay", by Drowning Pool from the album Hellelujah, 2016

== Literature ==
- Hell to Pay (Giangreco book), a 2009 book about World War II by Dennis Giangreco
- Hell to Pay: The Unfolding Story of Hillary Rodham Clinton, a 2001 biography by Barbara Olson
- Hell to Pay (novel), a 2002 crime novel by George Pelecanos
- Hell to Pay, a play by Amy Freed

== Film ==
- Hell to Pay (2005 film), by Roberto Gomez Martin
- Hell to Pay (2011 film), by Jay Jennings
- Suicide Squad: Hell to Pay, a 2018 animated film
