= Dennis Giangreco =

American author

Dennis Giangreco is an American author. He is also known as D. M. Giangreco. He is a former editor of Military Review, the publication of the United States Army Combined Arms Center.

== Bibliography ==
- Airbridge to Berlin: The Berlin Crisis of 1948, Its Origins and Aftermath (1988)
- Stealth Fighter Pilot (1993)
- War in Korea, 1950-1953; A Pictorial History (2000)
- Eyewitness D-Day: Firsthand Accounts from the Landing at Normandy to the Liberation of Paris (with Kathryn Moore)(2004)
- Delta: America's Elite Counterterrorist Force (with Terry Griswold) (2005)
- The Soldier from Independence: A Military Biography of Harry Truman (2009)
- Hell to Pay: Operation Downfall and the Invasion of Japan, 1945-1947 (2009)
- United States Army: The Definitive Illustrated History (2011)
- Truman and the Bomb: The Untold Story (2023)
