= Hell to Pay (Giangreco book) =

Book by Dennis Giangreco

Hell to Pay: Operation Downfall and the Invasion of Japan, 1945-1947
- Author: D.M. Giangreco
- ISBN: 1591143160

Hell to Pay: Operation Downfall and the Invasion of Japan, 1945-1947 is a book by Dennis Giangreco. It is about Operation Downfall, the proposed invasion of Imperial Japan during World War II.
