= Infinite (Deep Purple album) =

infinite

Studio album by Deep Purple
- Released: 7 April 2017
- Recorded: 2016
- Studio: The Tracking Room (Nashville, Tennessee); Anarchy Studios (Nashville); Noble Street Studios (Toronto, Canada); X-Level Studios (Stockholm, Sweden); Doron Plascow Studios (Tel Aviv, Israel); Headline Studios (Harston, UK)
- Genre: Hard rock; progressive rock
- Length: 45:37
- Label: earMusic
- Producer: Bob Ezrin

Deep Purple chronology
Now What?! (2013)	infinite (2017)	Whoosh! (2020)

Singles from Infinite
- 1. "Time for Bedlam" Released: 3 February 2017; 2. "All I Got Is You" Released: 10 March 2017; 3. "Johnny's Band" Released: 4 August 2017; 4. "The Surprising" Released: 4 October 2017

Infinite (stylised as infinite) is the twentieth studio album by English rock band Deep Purple, released on 7 April 2017.

== Reception ==
Professional ratings
Review scores
Source	Rating
AllMusic	3.5/5 stars
Louder Sound	3.5/5 stars
laut.de	4/5 stars
Sputnikmusic	3.5/5

A reviewer of Sputnikmusic commented "For all we know inFinite may very well be Deep Purple’s final stand and for what is worth, it cannot be compared with anything that the legendary act released in their heydays. However, try to think of bands that play like Deep Purple and you will probably fail to recognize even one. inFinite with all its limitations is an apotheosis of character and talent, the work of a group of men who feel comfortable in their own skin and comfortable with each other, which is weird to even fathom when we come to think of the history of the band. At the end of the day if this is how this story ends, it is a happy end after all." Paul Lester of Louder Sound stated "InFinite works best when Purple do what they do best: extrapolate and alchemize the blues and take it to new progressive heights".

== Track listing ==
All tracks are written by Don Airey, Ian Gillan, Roger Glover, Steve Morse, Ian Paice and Bob Ezrin, except where noted.

Standard edition
No.	Title	Lyrics	Music	Length
1.	"Time for Bedlam"			4:35
2.	"Hip Boots"			3:23
3.	"All I Got Is You"			4:42
4.	"One Night in Vegas"			3:23
5.	"Get Me Outta Here"			3:58
6.	"The Surprising"			5:57
7.	"Johnny's Band"			3:51
8.	"On Top of the World"			4:01
9.	"Birds of Prey"			5:47
10.	"Roadhouse Blues"	Jim Morrison	Morrison, John Densmore, Ray Manzarek, Robbie Krieger	6:00

Limited edition
No.	Title	Length
11.	"Paradise Bar"	4:10
12.	"Simple Folk" (A Solo Guitar Improvisation by Steve Morse)	1:16
13.	"Uncommon Man" (Previously Unreleased Instrumental Version)	6:58
14.	"Above and Beyond" (Previously Unreleased Instrumental Version)	5:30
15.	"Hip Boots" (Rehearsal, Ian Paice's Recording)	4:00
16.	"Time for Bedlam" (First Take from the Album Recordings)	3:38

Bonus DVD
No.	Title	Length
1.	"From Here to Infinite" (The Movie)	96:14

Gold edition - Disc two (Live At Hellfest 2017)
No.	Title	Length
1.	"Time for Bedlam"	4:59
2.	"Fireball"	3:27
3.	"Bloodsucker"	4:11
4.	"Strange Kind of Woman"	7:41
5.	"Uncommon Man"	6:41
6.	"The Surprising"	6:01
7.	"Lazy"	7:47
8.	"Birds of Prey"	5:47
9.	"Perfect Strangers"	7:10
10.	"Space Truckin’"	5:02
11.	"Smoke on the Water"	6:40
12.	"Peter Gunn / Hush" (writers: Henry Mancini / Joe South)	7:40
13.	"Black Night"	7:26

=== The Now What?! Live Tapes Vol. 2 ===
Deluxe Box Set Edition - three 10" records
No.	Title	Recorded at	Length
1.	"Après Vous"	Roundhouse, London, England, 17 October 2013
2.	"Into the Fire"	Roundhouse, London, England, 17 October 2013
3.	"The Mule"	Dieci Giorni Suonati, Ippodromo del Galoppo, Milan, Italy, 21 July 2013
4.	"Green Onions / Hush" (writers: Al Jackson Jr., Booker T. Jones, Lewis Steinberg, Steve Cropper / Joe South)	Getaway Rock Festival, Gasklockorna, Gaevle, Sweden, 10 August 2013
5.	"Contact Lost / Uncommon Man / Well-Dressed Guitar"	Roundhouse, London, England, 17 October 2013
6.	"All the Time in the World"	Skovdalen, Aalborg, Denmark, 8 August 2013
7.	"Highway Star"	Skovdalen, Aalborg, Denmark, 8 August 2013
8.	"Strange Kind of Woman"	Roundhouse, London, England, 17 October 2013
9.	"Space Truckin'"	Rock in Roma, Ippodromo delle Capannelle, Rome, Italy, 22 July 2013

== Personnel ==
- Ian Gillan – lead and backing vocals
- Steve Morse – guitars
- Roger Glover – bass guitar
- Ian Paice – drums
- Don Airey – keyboards

Additional musicians

- Bob Ezrin – additional keyboards, backing vocals, percussion, production, mixing
- Tommy Denander – additional guitar (track 8)

Production

- Bob Ezrin – production, mixing
- Justin Cortelyou – engineer, mixing
- Bryce Roberts – additional engineering
- Crispin Day – additional vocal recordings
- Trevor Anderson – additional vocal recordings
- Cody Robertson – assistant engineering
- Tommy Denander – additional engineering
- Doron Plascow – additional engineering
- Piers Mortimer – additional engineering

== Charts ==
=== Weekly charts ===
Chart (2017)	Peak position
Australian Albums (ARIA)	20
Austrian Albums (Ö3 Austria)	4
Belgian Albums (Ultratop Flanders)	7
Belgian Albums (Ultratop Wallonia)	5
Canadian Albums (Billboard)	49
Czech Albums (ČNS IFPI)	2
Dutch Albums (Album Top 100)	6
Finnish Albums (Suomen virallinen lista)	4
French Albums (SNEP)	15
German Albums (Offizielle Top 100)	1
Hungarian Albums (MAHASZ)	3
Irish Albums (IRMA)	52
Italian Albums (FIMI)	3
Japanese Albums (Oricon)	64
Japanese International Albums (Oricon)	13
Norwegian Albums (VG-lista)	3
Polish Albums (ZPAV)	2
Portuguese Albums (AFP)	20
Scottish Albums (OCC)	4
Slovak Albums (ČNS IFPI)	5
South Korean International Albums (Gaon)	12
Spanish Albums (PROMUSICAE)	10
Swedish Albums (Sverigetopplistan)	5
Swiss Albums (Schweizer Hitparade)	1
UK Albums (OCC)	6
UK Independent Albums (OCC)	1
UK Rock & Metal Albums (OCC)	1
US Billboard 200	105
US Top Rock Albums (Billboard)	16

=== Year-end charts ===
Chart (2017)	Position
Belgian Albums (Ultratop Flanders)	134
Belgian Albums (Ultratop Wallonia)	91
German Albums (Offizielle Top 100)	39
Swiss Albums (Schweizer Hitparade)	53

== Certifications ==
Region	Certification	Certified units/sales
Germany (BVMI)	Gold	100,000^{‡}
Hungary (MAHASZ)	Gold	1,000^{^}
Poland (ZPAV)	Gold	10,000^{‡}
^{^} Shipments figures based on certification alone.^{‡} Sales+streaming figures based on certification alone.
