= Concentração Motard de Faro =

Concentração Motard de Faro is an annual motor-cycle rally held in Portugal. The event spans four days and attracts an average of 30,000 bikers every year.
