= Now What?! =

Studio album by Deep Purple
- Released: 26 April 2013
- Recorded: 2012
- Studios: The Tracking Room, Anarchy Studios and Rainbow Recorders, Nashville, Tennessee, US
- Genres: Hard rock; progressive rock
- Length: 57:06
- Label: earMusic
- Producer: Bob Ezrin

Deep Purple chronology
Rapture of the Deep (2005)	Now What?! (2013)	Infinite (2017)

Singles from Now What?!
- 1. "All the Time in the World" Released: 29 March 2013; 2. "Hell to Pay" Released: 1 April 2013; 3. "Vincent Price" Released: 7 June 2013; 4. "Above and Beyond" Released: 24 October 2013; 5. "Out of Hand" Released: 18 April 2015

Now What?! is the 19th studio album by English rock band Deep Purple. It was released on 26 April 2013 and produced by Bob Ezrin. A dedicated official web site was also created by the band to post updates about the album. It was the band's first studio album in over seven years as Deep Purple's previous studio album, Rapture of the Deep, was released in late 2005.

On 26 February 2013, the album's title was announced. Additionally a new single featuring "Hell to Pay" and "All the Time in the World" was released in both CD and vinyl formats on 29 March 2013. On 6 May 2013 the band confirmed that a new single "Vincent Price" would be released on 7 June as download, CD single and 7" transparent vinyl. The single would also include the previously unreleased song "First Sign of Madness", two tracks from the now unavailable Rapture of the Deep limited edition and the track's video-clip.

The songs "Uncommon Man" and "Above and Beyond", which includes the lyrics "Souls having touched are forever entwined", are dedicated to founding member Jon Lord who died in July 2012. "Uncommon Man" is partly inspired by the classical composition "Fanfare for the Common Man", and features a synthesizer-generated fanfare theme composed by Don Airey.

== Reception ==
Professional ratings
Review scores
Source	Rating
AllMusic	4/5 stars
BW&BK	8/10
Daily Express	4/5
Metal Hammer (GER)	6/7
Record Collector	4/5 stars
Sputnikmusic	3.5/5 stars
The Quietus	(favourable)
Ultimate Guitar Archive	8.3/10

Following its release, Now What?! was met with mostly positive reception from critics. AllMusic's Steve Leggett commented that the album sounded like a product of progressive metal's golden age, saying "Some things really shouldn't change, and Deep Purple recognize that. They haven't changed a bit and the group's many fans are going to find this release comforting in that regard". Sputnikmusic reviewer wrote that "fans of Purpendicular and the group’s last two albums will find several pleasing moments and the band should feel proud of the outcome too."

The album appeared at No. 104 on Sputnikmusic's list of the "Best Progressive Rock Albums of 2013."

Now What?! sold 4,000 copies in its first week in the US. Six months after its release, Now What?! was certified gold in Germany (100 000 copies sold). It was the first Deep Purple studio album to enter both the Billboard 200 and the top 40 of the UK Albums Chart since The Battle Rages On... in 1993.

== Track listing ==
All tracks are written by Don Airey, Ian Gillan, Roger Glover, Steve Morse, Ian Paice and Bob Ezrin, except "It'll Be Me" by Jack Clement.

Standard edition
No.	Title	Length
1.	"A Simple Song"	4:39
2.	"Weirdistan"	4:14
3.	"Out of Hand"	6:09
4.	"Hell to Pay"	5:10
5.	"Body Line"	4:26
6.	"Above and Beyond"	5:30
7.	"Blood from a Stone"	5:18
8.	"Uncommon Man"	7:02
9.	"Après vous"	5:24
10.	"All the Time in the World"	4:21
11.	"Vincent Price"	4:46

Deluxe Edition bonus tracks
No.	Title	Length
12.	"It'll Be Me"	3:02

Deluxe Edition bonus DVD/Bonus Audio Content
No.	Title	Length
1.	"In Conversation (20 minutes)"	22:35
2.	"All the Time in the World (alternative radio mix)"	3:48
3.	"Perfect Strangers (live)"	6:42
4.	"Rapture of the Deep (live)"	5:17

Gold Edition bonus tracks
No.	Title	Length
12.	"It'll Be Me"	3:02
13.	"First Sign of Madness"	4:26

Gold Edition Deluxe - Disc one bonus tracks
No.	Title	Length
12.	"It'll Be Me"	3:02
13.	"First Sign of Madness"	4:26
14.	"Hell to Pay" (instrumental)	5:11
15.	"Après Vous" (instrumental)	5:23

Japanese Standard Edition bonus tracks
No.	Title	Length
12.	"Highway Star" (live from the Hard Rock Cafe, London, UK, October 2005)	8:09
13.	"Perfect Strangers" (live from the Hard Rock Cafe, London, UK, October 2005)	6:41
14.	"All the Time in the World" (Alternative Radio Mix)	3:48

Japanese Deluxe Edition bonus tracks
No.	Title	Length
12.	"It'll Be Me"	3:02
13.	"Smoke on the Water" (live from the Hard Rock Cafe, London, UK, October 2005)	6:50
14.	"Wrong Man" (live from the Hard Rock Cafe, London, UK, October 2005)	4:29
15.	"Hell to Pay" (Radio Edit)	3:42

=== The Now What?! Live Tapes ===
Gold Edition Deluxe - Disc two bonus tracks
No.	Title	Recorded at	Length
1.	"Strange Kind of Woman"	Rock in Roma, Ippodromo delle Capannelle, Rome, Italy, 22 July 2013	6:06
2.	"Hard Lovin' Man"	Skovdalen, Aalborg, Denmark, 8 August 2013	6:24
3.	"Vincent Price"	Skovdalen, Aalborg, Denmark, 8 August 2013	4:29
4.	"Contact Lost"	Skovdalen, Aalborg, Denmark, 8 August 2013	3:38
5.	"All the Time in the World"	Dieci Giorni Suonati, Ippodromo del Galoppo, Milan, Italy, 21 July 2013	4:56
6.	"No One Came"	Getaway Rock Festival, Gasklockorna, Gaevle, Sweden, 10 August 2013	5:21
7.	"Bodyline"	Rock in Roma, Ippodromo delle Capannelle, Rome, Italy, 22 July 2013	4:22
8.	"Perfect Strangers"	Getaway Rock Festival, Gasklockorna, Gaevle, Sweden, 10 August 2013	6:53
9.	"Above and Beyond"	Dieci Giorni Suonati, Ippodromo del Galoppo, Milan, Italy, 21 July 2013	5:29
10.	"Lazy"	Getaway Rock Festival, Gasklockorna, Gaevle, Sweden, 10 August 2013	8:22
11.	"Black Night"	Rock in Roma, Ippodromo delle Capannelle, Rome, Italy, 22 July 2013	9:03
12.	"Smoke on the Water"	Rock in Roma, Ippodromo delle Capannelle, Rome, Italy, 22 July 2013	7:18

=== Vincent Price ===
"Vincent Price"

Single by Deep Purple

from the album Now What?!
- B-side: "First Sign of Madness"
- Released: 7 June 2013
- Genre: Hard rock; progressive rock; progressive metal
- Length: 4:46
- Label: Edel AG
- Songwriters: Don Airey, Ian Gillan, Roger Glover, Steve Morse, Ian Paice, Bob Ezrin
- Producer: Bob Ezrin

Deep Purple singles chronology
"Hell to Pay" (2013)	"Vincent Price" (2013)	"Above and Beyond" (2013)

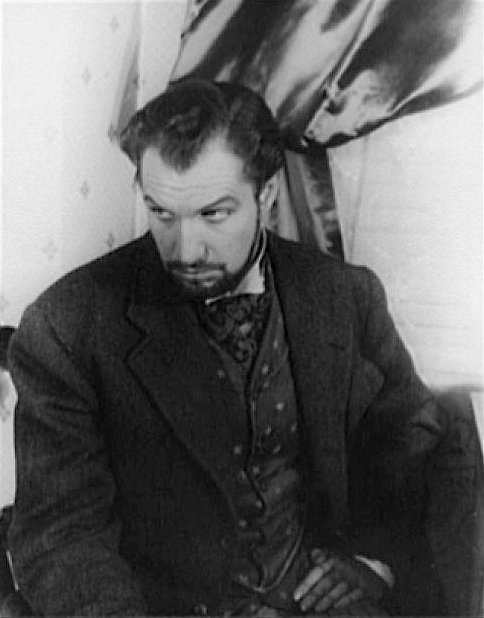
Vincent Price, the song's inspiration, appearing on Broadway.

Vincent Price is the second single from the album and the last track on it. Its release was announced on 6 May 2013 on their webpage and Facebook. Featuring a hard rock and progressive metal inspired style, reminiscent horror films, the song came out the next day as a digital download, expanded CD release, and seven-inch transparent vinyl. The music video was their first official video in seventeen years. All the then current band-members (Don Airey, Ian Gillan, Roger Glover, Steve Morse, and Ian Paice) helped to compose the track with producer Bob Ezrin.

The song is a tribute to the late classic horror icon Vincent Price, featuring sonic and lyrical references to horror tropes, including thunder and wailing and lyrics about human sacrifice and vampirism. Coming out of the group's typical jams, its style is reminiscent of instrumental film soundtracks.

Ian Gillan said,

"Everything emerges from the jam sessions we have every day and this is typical Purple. When an idea spins out, you set it aside and start thinking, 'We've got to look at the arrangement to this and the key'. You can't just identify them as number one and number two and number three, and so we give them working titles and this one sounded to everyone like the soundtrack to a horror movie, so we called it Vincent Price."

Gillan said he started the song by asking what elements a director of a Vincent Price horror film would want to include, and came up with items like "clanking chains, creaking doors, bloodsucking vampires, howling dogs, sacrificial virgins [and] zombies", the basis for the lyrics. Price worked with all the members of Deep Purple earlier in their careers.

Steve Leggett, writing for Allmusic, praised "Vincent Price" as a "massive, powerful, and just slightly eerie" tune. Blabbermouth.net predicted that the special CD single and its related seven-inch vinyl record will become a "collector's item", noting their inclusion of the song "First Sign of Madness" that was dropped from Now What?!. Daily News critic Jon Dawson claimed that it is "as bone-rattlingly superb as anything from [Deep Purple's] supposed early 1970s prime." Dawson called out the surging chord progressions, theremin-like guitar and horror movie-inspired lyrics. Classic Rock critic Dave Everley rated it one of Deep Purple's 10 best post-1994 songs and stated that "the winking Hammer Horror grandeur of Vincent Price masked the sound of a band reborn." In 2020, the editors of Classic Rock rated it the 68th greatest song of the century so far, praising the "big swaggering monster of a groove from guitarist Steve Morse." On the other hand. Classic Rock critic Geoff Barton described it as "throwaway schlock-horror".

==== 7" single ====
1. "Vincent Price"
2. "First Sign of Madness"

==== CD single ====
1. "Vincent Price" - 4:47
2. "First Sign of Madness" - 4:26
3. "The Well-Dressed Guitar" - 2:51
4. "Wrong Man" - 4:30 (Live performance from a 10-10-2005 set in London)

== Personnel ==
Deep Purple

- Ian Gillan – lead and backing vocals
- Steve Morse – guitars
- Roger Glover – bass guitar
- Don Airey – keyboards
- Ian Paice – drums

Additional musicians

- Jason Roller – acoustic guitar ("All the Time in the World")
- Eric Darken – percussion ("Bodyline", "All The Time in the World")
- Mike Johnson – steel guitar ("All The Time in the World", "Vincent Price")
- David Hamilton – additional keyboards ("Uncommon Man", "Weirdistan", "Above And Beyond")
- Students of Nimbus School of Recording Arts – gang vocals ("Hell to Pay")
- Bob Ezrin – additional backing vocals & percussion

Production

- Bob Ezrin – production, mixing
- Justin Cortelyou – engineering, mixing
- Li Xiao Le – assistant engineering
- Zach Allan, Jarad Clement – additional engineering (The Tracking Room),
- Rob Harris, Mike Airey & Nathan Sage – additional engineering (Rainbow Recorders)
- Greg Calbi – mastering at Sterling Sound, New York City

== Charts ==
=== Weekly charts ===
Chart (2013)	Peak position
Austrian Albums (Ö3 Austria)	1
Belgian Albums (Ultratop Flanders)	33
Belgian Albums (Ultratop Wallonia)	14
Danish Albums (Hitlisten)	18
Dutch Albums (Album Top 100)	12
Finnish Albums (Suomen virallinen lista)	8
French Albums (SNEP)	57
German Albums (Offizielle Top 100)	1
Hungarian Albums (MAHASZ)	7
Irish Albums (IRMA)	87
Italian Albums (FIMI)	12
Japanese Albums (Oricon)	50
Norwegian Albums (VG-lista)	1
Polish Albums (ZPAV)	5
Russian Albums (Blabbermouth)	3
Scottish Albums (Official Charts)	13
Spanish Albums (Promusicae)	19
Swedish Albums (Sverigetopplistan)	7
Swiss Albums (Schweizer Hitparade)	2
UK Albums (Official Charts)	19
UK Independent Albums (Official Charts)	4
UK Rock & Metal Albums (Official Charts)	1
US Billboard 200	110
US Top Rock Albums (Billboard)	33

=== Year-end charts ===
Chart (2013)	Position
Belgian Albums (Ultratop Wallonia)	145
German Albums (Offizielle Top 100)	93
Swiss Albums (Schweizer Hitparade)	99

== Certifications ==
Region	Certification	Certified units/sales
Germany (BVMI)	Gold	100,000^{^}
Russia (NFPF)	Gold	25,000
^{^} Shipments figures based on certification alone.

== Accolades ==
Publication	Country	Accolade	Year	Rank
Revolver	United States	"Golden Gods Awards 2014"	2014	Comeback of the Year: Deep Purple
