= Rapture of the Deep =

Studio album by Deep Purple
- Released: 24 October 2005
- Recorded: March–June 2005
- Studios: Chunky Style Studios, Los Angeles, California
- Genres: Hard rock; progressive rock
- Length: 50:53
- Label: Edel
- Producer: Michael Bradford

Deep Purple chronology
Bananas (2003)	Rapture of the Deep (2005)	Now What?! (2013)

Rapture of the Deep is the 18th studio album by English rock band Deep Purple, released in Europe on 24 October 2005, and in the US on 1 November 2005. It is the fourth studio album from Deep Purple since Steve Morse joined the band in 1994 and the second to feature veteran keyboardist Don Airey. The album was produced by Michael Bradford who also produced the band's previous release, Bananas.

== Content ==
The album's title relates to an alternative name for the nitrogen narcosis psychological condition capable of affecting deep sea divers. Of the title, bassist Roger Glover said: "I like it because it's got opposites, a duality there, and I'm always fond of that. If you're a scuba diver and you dive down below three atmospheres or 110, 120 feet, something like that, you have excess nitrogen in your blood, and it's called nitrogen narcosis. It's a known danger. And what it does to you, is it makes you really happy, like being drunk. The danger is you're in rapture, you're in a state of pure joy and bliss and at one with the world, and you love being down there and you want to be part of it, so you take your mask off and die."

According to drummer Ian Paice, the title track was created after keyboardist Don Airey was "fiddling around with something, and I said, 'Can we add something that has a sort of Turkish or Middle Eastern flavour to the riff?' I had the idea of what the tempo should be and said, 'Just put in your mind something different from the Western way.' About two minutes later, the other guys wandered into the studio and started picking up on what we were doing. We tried to keep that Eastern way of how the riff keeps coming back in, the regularity of it, for the basis of the tune. Then [singer] Ian [Gillan] wandered in and got fired up about it. We worked on the tune for about a day and recorded it the next day."

The track "Money Talks" sees singer Ian Gillan perform the widest vocal range heard on any Deep Purple recording, with the bridge featuring a double-tracked deep bass vocal and the song's coda featuring a high-pitched scream.

== Release and reception ==
Professional ratings
Review scores
Source	Rating
About.com	4/5 stars
AllMusic	3.5/5 stars
BBC Music	(favourable)
BW&BK	10/10
Drowned in Sound	5/10
PopMatters	7/10
Terrorizer	4/10

Like Bananas, the album received generally positive reviews from critics and fans. Rapture of the Deep is Deep Purple's first release in Europe on the German label Edel Records, while in the US the record was released by Edel's sub-label Eagle Records.

The album peaked on Billboard's US Top Independent Albums chart at position No. 43. In the US, the album sold 2500 copies during the first week. In the UK, the album sold 3500 copies during the first week and 1200 copies during the week after. It also made the top 20 in several European charts. The title track "Rapture of the Deep" was released as a promo single in 2005.

The original production was widely compared to that of a vinyl record. A remixed re-release was issued in August 2025.

== Track listing ==
All music is composed by Don Airey, Ian Gillan, Roger Glover, Steve Morse and Ian Paice, except where noted.

No.	Title	Length
1.	"Money Talks"	5:31
2.	"Girls Like That"	4:02
3.	"Wrong Man"	4:53
4.	"Rapture of the Deep"	5:58
5.	"Clearly Quite Absurd"	5:25
6.	"Don't Let Go"	4:32
7.	"Back to Back"	4:03
8.	"Kiss Tomorrow Goodbye"	4:18
9.	"Junkyard Blues"	5:32
10.	"Before Time Began"	6:30

Japanese bonus track
No.	Title	Length
11.	"Things I Never Said"	4:48

Limited Edition/Special Tour Edition bonus tracks
No.	Title	Length
9.	"MTV"	4:56
10.	"Junkyard Blues"	5:33
11.	"Before Time Began"	6:30

Special Tour Edition bonus disc
No.	Title	Writer(s)	Length
1.	"Clearly Quite Absurd" (new version)		3:38
2.	"Things I Never Said"		4:48
3.	"The Well-Dressed Guitar" (instrumental outtake from Bananas sessions)	Morse	2:51
4.	"Rapture of the Deep" (Live at the Hard Rock Cafe, London, 10 October 2005)		5:15
5.	"Wrong Man" (Live at the Hard Rock Cafe, London, 10 October 2005)		4:29
6.	"Highway Star" (Live at the Hard Rock Cafe, London, 10 October 2005)	Ritchie Blackmore, Gillan, Glover, Jon Lord, Paice	8:09
7.	"Smoke on the Water" (Live at the Hard Rock Cafe, London, 10 October 2005)	Blackmore, Gillan, Glover, Lord, Paice	6:50
8.	"Perfect Strangers" (Live at the Hard Rock Cafe, London, 10 October 2005)	Blackmore, Gillan, Glover	6:40

=== 20th Anniversary Remix ===
No.	Title	Length
1.	"Money Talks"	5:34
2.	"Things I Never Said"	4:47
3.	"Rapture of the Deep"	5:54
4.	"Clearly Quite Absurd"	5:24
5.	"MTV"	4:54
6.	"Back to Back"	4:02
7.	"Wrong Man"	4:33
8.	"Girls Like That"	3:56
9.	"Kiss Tomorrow Goodbye"	4:17
10.	"Don't Let Go"	4:34
11.	"Junkyard Blues"	5:31
12.	"Before Time Began"	6:19

Disc two - Studio Rehearsals
No.	Title	Writer(s)	Length
13.	"MTV (Studio Rehearsal)"		4:57
14.	"Money Talks (Studio Rehearsal)"		4:30
15.	"Back to Back (Studio Rehearsal)"		3:57
16.	"Before Time Began (Studio Rehearsal)"		5:06
17.	"Closing Note (Studio Rehearsal)"	Morse	2:50

== Personnel ==
Deep Purple

- Ian Gillan – vocals
- Steve Morse – guitars
- Don Airey – keyboards
- Roger Glover – bass
- Ian Paice – drums

Production

- Produced and engineered by Michael Bradford
- Recorded at Chunky Style Studios, Los Angeles, CA, 2005
- Mastered by Andy Van Dette at Masterdisk. New York

== Charts ==
Chart (2005)	Peak position
Austrian Albums (Ö3 Austria)	20
Belgian Albums (Ultratop Wallonia)	64
Czech Republic Albums Chart	32
Finnish Albums (Suomen virallinen lista)	11
French Albums (SNEP)	85
German Albums (Offizielle Top 100)	10
Italian Albums (FIMI)	19
Japanese Albums (Oricon)	240
Polish Albums Chart	40
Scottish Albums (Official Charts)	71
Swedish Albums (Sverigetopplistan)	22
Swiss Albums (Schweizer Hitparade)	16
UK Albums (Official Charts)	81
UK Independent Albums (Official Charts)	8
UK Rock & Metal Albums (Official Charts)	3
US Independent Albums (Billboard)	43

Chart (2025)	Peak position
German Pop Albums (Offizielle Top 100)	3
Hungarian Physical Albums (MAHASZ)	13

== Accolades ==
Publication	Country	Accolade	Year	Rank
Classic Rock	United Kingdom	"Classic Rock Album of the Year 2005"	2006	24
