= Don Airey =

English keyboardist (born 1948)

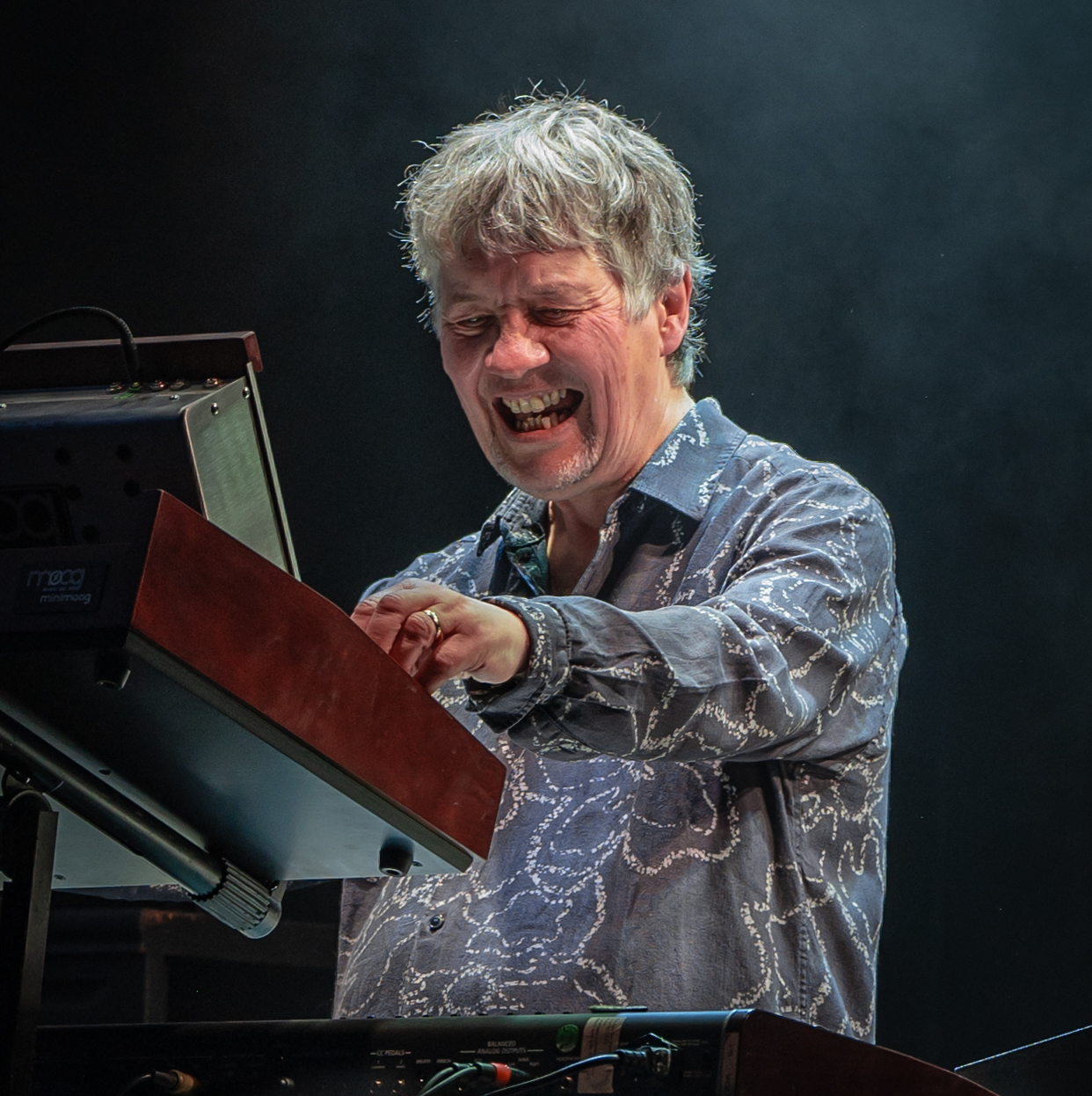
- Airey performing with Deep Purple in 2024

Background information
- Born: Donald Smith Airey; 21 June 1948 (age 78); Sunderland, England
- Genres: Rock; hard rock; heavy metal; blues rock; progressive rock; jazz fusion
- Occupations: Musician; songwriter
- Instrument: Keyboards
- Years active: 1969–present
- Member of: Deep Purple
- Formerly of: Rainbow; Ozzy Osbourne; Black Sabbath; Gary Moore; Glenn Tipton; Judas Priest; Wishbone Ash; Whitesnake; Ten; Jethro Tull; ELO Part II; Hollywood Monsters; Divlje Jagode; Anthem

Donald Smith Airey (born 21 June 1948) is an English musician. He came to prominence as the keyboardist of the rock band Rainbow during 1979–1982. He has been the keyboardist of Deep Purple since 2002, after the retirement of Jon Lord. In addition to his tenures with Rainbow and Deep Purple, he has had a long and productive career playing with many other rock and metal acts, including Gary Moore, Ozzy Osbourne, Judas Priest, Black Sabbath, Jethro Tull, Whitesnake, Saxon, Wishbone Ash, Colosseum II, Ten, Sinner, Michael Schenker, Empire, Brian May, Divlje jagode and Living Loud. He has also worked with Andrew Lloyd Webber.

== Early life ==
Inspired by his father, Norman Airey, Don Airey took a love for music at a young age and was trained in classical piano from the age of seven. He continued his love for music by earning a degree at the University of Nottingham and a diploma at the Royal Northern College of Music (where he studied under Ryszard Bakst). Following his studies, he formed a band and worked on P&O cruise liners travelling the world.

== Career ==
=== 1970s work ===
In 1971 he moved to London and joined Cozy Powell's band Hammer. In 1975 he joined Jon Hiseman's highly influential jazz rock band Colosseum II, along with Gary Moore, Neil Murray, Mike Starrs and later John Mole. They made three albums and also formed the core band for Andrew Lloyd Webber's album Variations, a set of variations on a theme by Paganini. Don worked on several albums with solo artists and was a session musician on the 1978 Black Sabbath album Never Say Die! Soon after, he joined guitarist Ritchie Blackmore's band, Rainbow, and featured on Gary Moore's solo debut Back on the Streets. With Rainbow he contributed to two hit albums, Down to Earth and Difficult to Cure.

=== 1980s work ===
After leaving Rainbow in 1981, Airey joined with Ozzy Osbourne for a three-year stint. He had played on the 1980 Blizzard of Ozz album. He then played on the Diary of a Madman Tour from 1981 to 1982 and was also the only witness to Randy Rhoads's death. Airey also helped with the albums Speak of the Devil (released in 1982) and Bark at the Moon (released in 1983). Airey joined Jethro Tull in 1987 for their tour in support of Crest of a Knave. The same year also saw the release of Whitesnake's multi-platinum Whitesnake, on which Airey played keyboards. Soon after he quit the band to record the solo album K2 – Tales of Triumph and Tragedy. In it he plays with Gary Moore and Keith Airey – guitars, Cozy Powell – drums, Laurence Cottle – bass, Chris (Hamlet) Thompson, Colin Blunstone, Mel Galley, and Genki Hitomi – vocals.

=== 1990s onwards ===
In 1990, Airey recorded keyboard parts for several songs on Judas Priest's album Painkiller. However, because Judas Priest wanted the album to have a heavier sound than their previous work, only one song on Painkiller, "A Touch of Evil", prominently features Airey. In a 2020 interview, Airey revealed that he also played most of the album's bass parts on a Minimoog, as Judas Priest bassist Ian Hill was unable to participate in recording sessions due to illness. He also toured with the Japanese heavy metal band Anthem, in 1990 and 1992.

In 1997 he arranged and played on "Love Shine a Light" by Katrina and the Waves, conducting the accompanying orchestra at the Eurovision Song Contest. The song won the contest.

In 1999 he joined Manchester-based melodic hard rock band Ten where he played keyboards on the album Babylon, which was released in 2000. He also toured with the band in support of the new album.

Airey played keyboards on the song "Darkness Be My Friend" by Iron Maiden vocalist Bruce Dickinson, released on the 2002 reissue of Dickinson's debut solo album Tattooed Millionaire. Airey also played keyboards on At Vance's Olaf Lenk's first solo album Sunset Cruise. In 2006 Airey featured on Gary Moore's release Old New Ballads Blues contributing to all tracks.

In 2008 Airey released his second solo album, A Light in the Sky and recently it has been announced that another solo album from Airey is set to premiere in 2011.

In early 2014 Airey joined hard rock band Hollywood Monsters where he played keyboards (Hammond B3 organ) on the track "Move On" on the album "Big Trouble" which was released in 2014 on Mausoleum Records. The album features Steph Honde on vocals and guitars, Vinny Appice on drums, Tim Bogert on bass and Paul Di'Anno on lead vocals on the bonus track.

On 18 January 2017, Airey was inducted into the Hall of Heavy Metal History.

In January 2020, Airey played two shows with Uriah Heep, filling in for Phil Lanzon after the keyboardist's son died.

=== Deep Purple ===
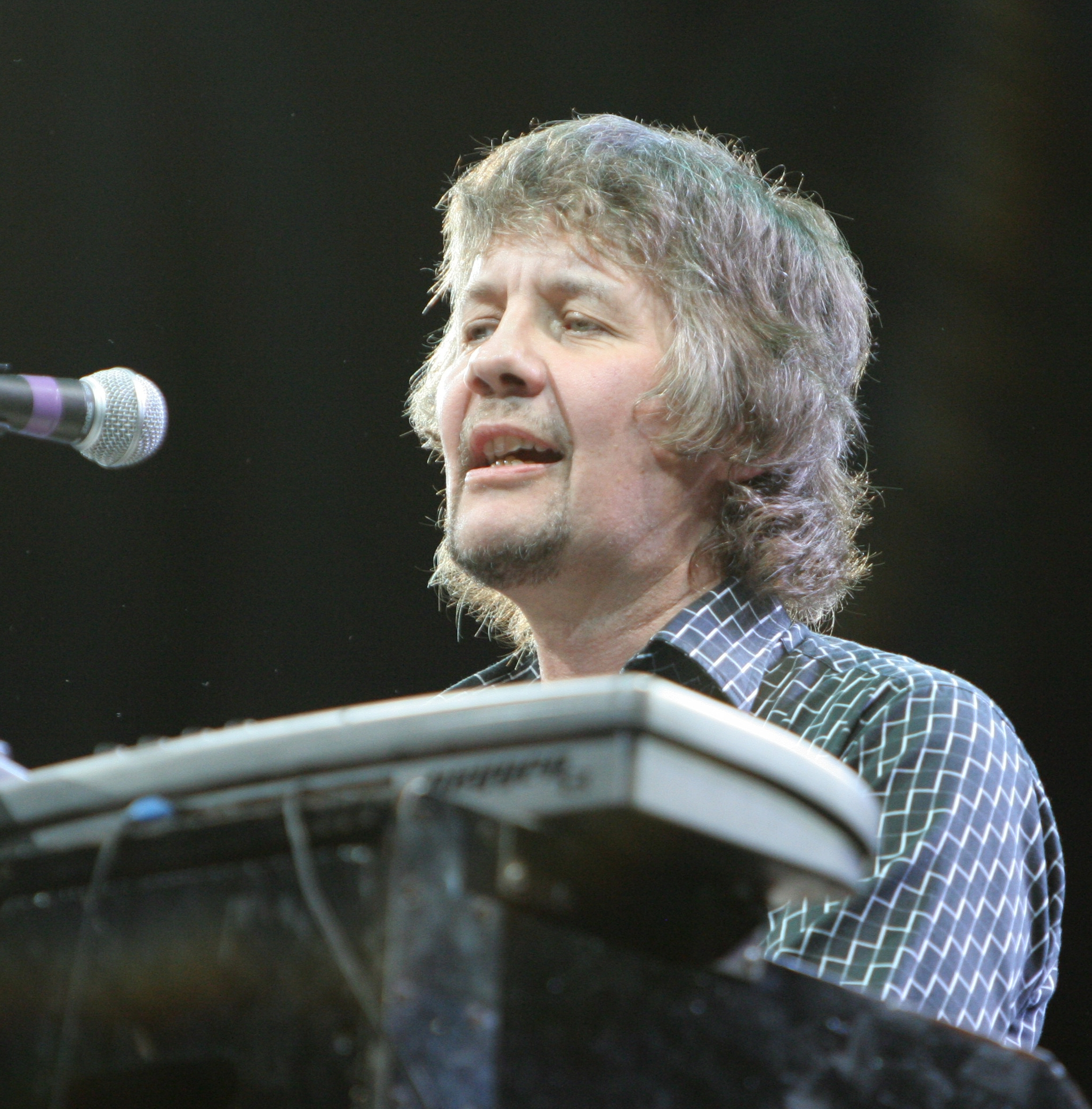
Airey with Deep Purple in 2005

Airey joined Deep Purple in 2001 to fill in for an injured Jon Lord, who subsequently retired from the band. Airey joined the band as a full-time keyboardist in March 2002. He has recorded eight studio albums with the band: Bananas, Rapture of the Deep, Now What?!, Infinite, Whoosh!, Turning to Crime, =1, and Splat!.

Interviewed by Jeb Wright, for Classic Rock Revisited, about the album Now What?!, he said "Well, it's Deep Purple and there is a Hammond there. There is only one way to go, really. Over the years, I have really worked on my sound, it didn't just happen overnight. The first two, or three, years I was with the band, I was using Jon's C3 and it was pretty knackered. I had it refurbished. It's been put in mothballs now... I much prefer Hammond A-100's, that's my choice."

== Instruments and gear ==
Airey has employed many instruments and effect processors to aid him in the creation of his music and is well known for the use of his Hammond A100. In an interview with Keyboard Magazine Don Airey explained that he preferred the Hammond A-100 over other organs (including the Hammond B-3) for their "purer tone" in live settings. He also uses Leslie 122 speakers and a Hughes and Kettner Puretone amplifier. For piano sounds, Airey uses a Kurzweil PC3K8 and also uses a Moog Voyager. He also uses several rack and pedal based units such as a Roland Fantom.

Airey is also an endorsing artist for several effects companies including TC Electronic and currently uses a Neunaber Seraphim Shimmer as well as a TC Hall of Fame Reverb and a TC Flashback Delay.

== Personal life ==
Airey lives with his wife, Doris, and their three children in South West Cambridgeshire. In 1992, Airey's son suffered from a serious illness, causing him to slow down his musical activity until 1995. Airey is an ardent Sunderland A.F.C. fan.

He is currently writing a book about his experiences in the music business.

== Discography ==
=== Solo ===
Year	Title	Notes
1988	K2	Studio
2005	E-Thnik (with Mario Fasciano, Steve Morse & Ian Paice)	Studio
2008	A Light in the Sky	Studio
2011	All Out	Studio
2014	Keyed Up	Studio
2018	One of a Kind	Studio
2019	Contractual Obligation #1: Live in Moscow (with Ian Gillan and Orchestra)	Live, BD/2CD
2019	Contractual Obligation #2: Live in Warsaw (with Ian Gillan and Orchestra)	Live, 2Cd
2019	Contractual Obligation #3: Live in St. Petersburg (with Ian Gillan and Orchestra)	Live, 3LP
2021	Live in Hamburg	Live, Recorded 2017
2025	Pushed to the Edge	Studio

=== As band member ===
Year	Band	Title
1974	Cozy Powell's Hammer	"Na Na Na" (Single)
1976	Colosseum II	Strange New Flesh
1977	Colosseum II	Electric Savage
1977	Colosseum II	War Dance
1979	Rainbow	Down to Earth
1979	Rainbow	Denver 1979 (LP)
1979	Rainbow	Long Island 1979 (LP)
1979	Rainbow	Down to Earth Tour 1979 (box set)
1980	Rainbow	Monsters of Rock - Live at Donnington 1980
1981	Rainbow	Difficult to Cure
1981	Rainbow	Boston 1981
1983	Ozzy Osbourne	Bark at the Moon
1986	Rainbow	Finyl Vinyl
1997	Quatermass II	Quatermass II: Long Road
1998	The Snakes/The Company of Snakes	Live in Europe
2001	The Snakes/The Company of Snakes	Here They Go Again
2001	Empire	Hypnotica
2003	Empire	Trading Souls
2003	Living Loud	Living Loud
2004	Living Loud	Live in Sydney 2004 (2CD/DVD)
2003	Deep Purple	Bananas
2005	Deep Purple	Rapture of the Deep
2006	Deep Purple	They All Came Down to Montreux (CD) / Live at Montreux 2006 (DVD)
2007	Deep Purple	Over Zurich (DVD)
2002	Deep Purple	Live at the NEC UK 2002 (DVD)
2011	Deep Purple	Live at Montreux 2011 (CD / DVD)
2013	Deep Purple	Now What?!
2013	Deep Purple	The Now What?! Live Tapes
2014	Deep Purple, Bruce Dickinson, Glenn Hughes, Paul Weller, Rick Wakeman & Many Others	Celebrating Jon Lord at the Royal Albert Hall (CD / DVD)
2014	Deep Purple	Live in Verona (CD / DVD)
2015	Deep Purple	From the Setting Sun... (In Wacken) (CD / DVD)
2015	Deep Purple	...To the Rising Sun (In Tokyo) (CD / DVD)
2017	Deep Purple	InFinite
2017	Deep Purple	The Infinite Live Recordings, Vol. 1
2013	Deep Purple	Live in Rome 2013
2020	Deep Purple	Whoosh!
2002	Deep Purple	Live in London 2002
2021	Deep Purple	Turning to Crime
2024	Deep Purple	=1
2026	Deep Purple	Splat!

=== As session member ===
Year	Band	Title
1977	Andrew Lloyd Webber	Variations
1978	Strife	Back to Thunder
1978	Black Sabbath	Never Say Die
1978	Gary Moore	Back on the Streets
1979	Cozy Powell	Over the Top
1980	Michael Schenker Group	The Michael Schenker Group
1980	Ozzy Osbourne	Blizzard of Ozz
1981	Cozy Powell	Tilt
1982	Gary Moore	Corridors of Power
1983	Gary Moore	Dirty Fingers
1983	Gary Moore	Rockin' Every Night – Live in Japan
1983	Gary Moore	Live
1983	Cozy Powell	Octopuss
1985	Gary Moore	Run for Cover
1987	Wild Strawberries	Wild Strawberries
1987	Whitesnake	Whitesnake
1989	Whitesnake	Slip of the Tongue
1989	Gary Moore	After the War
1990	Gary Moore	Still Got the Blues
1990	Judas Priest	Painkiller
1992	Cozy Powell	The Drums Are Back
1992	UFO	High Stakes & Dangerous Men
1997	Glenn Tipton	Baptizm of Fire
2000	Uli Jon Roth	Transcendental Sky Guitar
2000	Ten	Babylon
2001	Judas Priest	Demolition
2004	Tony Iommi with Glenn Hughes	The 1996 DEP Sessions
2006	Gary Moore	Old New Ballads Blues
2006	Tipton, Entwistle & Powell	Edge of the World
2008	Judas Priest	Nostradamus
2008	Michael Schenker Group	In the Midst of Beauty
2011	Michael Schenker	Temple of Rock
2011	Saxon	Call to Arms

== Guest appearances ==
- 1976 – Babe Ruth – Kid's Stuff
- 1978 – Jim Rafferty – Don't Talk Back
- 1979 – Bernie Marsden – And About Time Too
- 1985 – Alaska – The Pack
- 1985 – Phenomena – Phenomena
- 1985 – Gary Moore & Phil Lynott – "Out in the Fields"
- 1986 – Zeno – Zeno
- 1987 – Wild Strawberries – Wild Strawberries
- 1987 – Helix – Wild in the Streets
- 1988 – Fastway – On Target
- 1988 – Jethro Tull – 20 Years of Jethro Tull
- 1989 – Crossbones – Crossbones
- 1990 – Perfect Crime – Blond on Blonde
- 1990 – Jagged Edge – You Don't Love Me
- 1990 – Bruce Dickinson – Tattooed Millionaire
- 1990 – Forcefield – IV – Let the Wild Run Free
- 1990 – Tigertailz – Bezerk
- 1991 – Graham Bonnet – Here Comes the Night
- 1992 – Anthem – Domestic Booty
- 1992 – Kaizoku – Kaizoku
- 1992 – Brian May – Back to the Light
- 1994 – The Kick – Tough Trip Thru Paradise
- 1994 – Katrina and the Waves – Turnaround
- 1998 – Colin Blunstone – The Light
- 1998 – The Cage – The Cage
- 1998 – Olaf Lenk – Sunset Cruise
- 1998 – Eddie Hardin – Wind in the Willows (live)
- 1999 – Millennium – Millennium
- 2000 – Micky Moody – I Eat Them for Breakfast
- 2000 – Silver – Silver
- 2000 – Olaf Lenk's F.O.O.D. – Fun Stuff
- 2001 – Silver – Dream Machines
- 2001 – Rolf Munkes' Empire – Hypnotica
- 2002 – Metalium – Hero Nation – Chapter Three
- 2002 – Bernie Marsden – Big Boy Blue
- 2002 – Rolf Munkes' Empire – Trading Souls
- 2003 – Silver – Intruder
- 2005 – Kimberley Rew – Essex Hideaway
- 2006 – Gwyn Ashton – Prohibition
- 2009 – Carl Sentance – Mind Doctor
- 2011 – Wishbone Ash – Elegant Stealth
- 2012 – Persian Risk – Once a King
- 2012 – Various artists – Help! For Japan
- 2013 – Schubert – In Rock
- 2014 - Hollywood Monsters - Big Trouble
- 2014 - AraPacis - A Disturbing Awakening
- 2021 - Metalium - Never Surrender
