= Bananas (Deep Purple album) =

Studio album by Deep Purple
- Released: 25 August 2003
- Recorded: January–February 2003
- Studio: Royaltone (Burbank, California)
- Genre: Hard rock
- Length: 51:25
- Label: EMI
- Producer: Michael Bradford

Deep Purple chronology
Abandon (1998)	Bananas (2003)	Rapture of the Deep (2005)

Singles from Bananas
- 1. "Haunted" Released: 22 September 2003 (EU)

Professional ratings
Review scores
Source	Rating
AllMusic	4/5 stars

Bananas is the 17th studio album by English hard rock band Deep Purple, released on 25 August 2003 by EMI Records and on 7 October 2003 by Sanctuary Records in the US. It is the first album to feature Don Airey on organ and keyboards, replacing founding member Jon Lord.

== Overview ==
The album was recorded in Los Angeles during January and February 2003. The song "Haunted" features backing vocals Beth Hart. The album includes "Contact Lost", a short slow instrumental requiem for the Space Shuttle Columbia astronauts, written by guitarist Steve Morse when he heard the news of the crash.

The photo in the album cover was taken by the band's manager Bruce Payne. Bananas charted well despite lack of media exposure, especially in Europe and South America (notably in Germany and Argentina where it peaked in the top 10).

== Unreleased tracks ==
Since the Abandon album, Deep Purple performed three new songs onstage. "Long Time Gone" was debuted in the summer of 2000 but not included on Bananas. Another new song, "Up the Wall" was played on the 2002 UK tour and reworked into "I Got Your Number". The instrumental "Well Dressed Guitar" remained unreleased until the next album, 2005's Rapture of the Deep.

== Track listing ==
All tracks are written by Ian Gillan, Roger Glover, Steve Morse, Don Airey, and Ian Paice, except where indicated.

No.	Title	Writer(s)	Length
1.	"House of Pain"	Gillan, Michael Bradford	3:34
2.	"Sun Goes Down"		4:10
3.	"Haunted"		4:22
4.	"Razzle Dazzle"		3:28
5.	"Silver Tongue"		4:03
6.	"Walk On"	Gillan, Bradford	7:04
7.	"Picture of Innocence"	Gillan, Glover, Morse, Jon Lord, Paice	5:11
8.	"I Got Your Number"	Gillan, Glover, Morse, Lord, Paice, Bradford	6:01
9.	"Never a Word"		3:46
10.	"Bananas"		4:51
11.	"Doing It Tonight"		3:28
12.	"Contact Lost"	Morse	1:27

== Personnel ==
Deep Purple

- Ian Gillan – vocals
- Steve Morse – guitars
- Roger Glover – bass guitar
- Don Airey – keyboards
- Ian Paice – drums, percussion

Additional musicians

- Paul Buckmaster – string arrangement and cello on "Haunted"
- Beth Hart – backing vocals on "Haunted"
- Michael Bradford – guitar on "Walk On"

Production

- Michael Bradford – producer, engineer
- Chris Wonzer – assistant engineer
- Andy Vandette – mastering at Masterdisk, New York

== Charts ==
Chart (2003)	Peak position
Argentinian Albums Chart	10
Austrian Albums (Ö3 Austria)	12
Belgian Albums (Ultratop Wallonia)	42
Czech Republic Albums Chart	17
Finnish Albums (Suomen virallinen lista)	6
French Albums (SNEP)	50
German Albums (Offizielle Top 100)	3
Italian Albums (FIMI)	13
Japanese Albums (Oricon)	212
Norwegian Albums (VG-lista)	19
Polish Albums Chart	24
Scottish Albums (Official Charts)	70
Swedish Albums (Sverigetopplistan)	18
Swiss Albums (Schweizer Hitparade)	13
UK Albums (Official Charts)	85
UK Rock & Metal Albums (Official Charts)	10

== Certifications ==
Region	Certification	Certified units/sales
Russia (NFPF)	Gold	10,000^{*}
^{*} Sales figures based on certification alone.
