= The Platinum Collection (Deep Purple album) =

Greatest hits album by Deep Purple
- Released: 21 March 2005
- Recorded: 1968–2003
- Genre: Hard rock, heavy metal, progressive rock, psychedelic rock
- Length: 214:11
- Label: EMI

Deep Purple compilations chronology
The Early Years (2004)	The Platinum Collection (2005)	1420 Beachwood Drive (2006)

Professional ratings
Review scores
Source	Rating
Allmusic	3/5 stars

The Platinum Collection is a compilation album released by English rock group Deep Purple. It features songs from their first album Shades of Deep Purple up to their (at the time) most recent album Bananas.

== Track listing ==
All songs written by Ian Gillan, Ritchie Blackmore, Roger Glover, Jon Lord and Ian Paice, except where noted.

=== Disc one ===
No.	Title	Place of Origin	Length
1.	"Hush" (Joe South)	Shades of Deep Purple, 1968	4:26
2.	"Mandrake Root" (Rod Evans, Blackmore, Lord)	Shades of Deep Purple	6:11
3.	"Hey Joe" (Billy Roberts)	Shades of Deep Purple	7:27
4.	"Kentucky Woman" (Neil Diamond)	The Book of Taliesyn, 1968	4:42
5.	"Wring That Neck" (Blackmore, Nick Simper, Lord, Paice)	The Book of Taliesyn	5:12
6.	"Shield" (Evans, Blackmore, Lord)	The Book of Taliesyn	6:03
7.	"Bird Has Flown" (Evans, Blackmore, Lord)	Deep Purple, 1969	2:53
8.	"Emmaretta" (Evans, Blackmore, Lord)	Non-album single, 1969	3:07
9.	"Hallelujah" (Roger Cook, Roger Greenaway)	Non-album single, 1969	3:41
10.	"Black Night" (Single version)	Non-album single, 1970	3:27
11.	"Speed King"	Deep Purple in Rock, 1970	5:51
12.	"Flight of the Rat"	Deep Purple in Rock	7:52
13.	"Child in Time"	Deep Purple in Rock	10:20

=== Disc two ===
No.	Title	Place of Origin	Length
1.	"Fireball"	Fireball, 1971	3:24
2.	"Strange Kind of Woman"	Fireball (U.S. version)	3:51
3.	"Demon's Eye"	Fireball	5:20
4.	"No One Came" (1996 remix)	Fireball	6:24
5.	"Highway Star" (1997 remix)	Machine Head, 1972	6:29
6.	"Smoke on the Water"	Machine Head	5:41
7.	"When a Blind Man Cries" (1997 remix)	B-side of the "Never Before" single, 1972	3:30
8.	"Space Truckin'" (1997 remix)	Machine Head	4:56
9.	"Lazy" (Live)	Made in Japan, 1972/1973; originally from Machine Head	10:33
10.	"Never Before" (Live)	Deep Purple in Concert, 1980/1982; originally from Machine Head	3:57
11.	"Woman from Tokyo"	Who Do We Think We Are, 1973	5:49
12.	"Smooth Dancer"	Who Do We Think We Are	4:09
13.	"Mary Long"	Who Do We Think We Are	4:24
14.	"Burn" (Single edit; David Coverdale, Blackmore, Lord, Paice)	Burn, 1974	4:33

=== Disc three ===
No.	Title	Place of Origin	Length
1.	"Might Just Take Your Life" (Coverdale, Blackmore, Lord, Paice)	Burn	4:38
2.	"Coronarias Redig" (Blackmore, Lord, Paice)	B-side of the "Burn" single, 1974	4:53
3.	"Stormbringer" (Coverdale, Blackmore)	Stormbringer, 1974	4:05
4.	"Hold On" (Coverdale, Glenn Hughes, Lord, Paice)	Stormbringer	5:05
5.	"Soldier of Fortune" (Coverdale, Blackmore)	Stormbringer	3:14
6.	"Mistreated (interpolating "Rock Me Baby")" (Live; Coverdale, Blackmore, Joe Josea, B.B. King)	Made in Europe, 1976; originally from Burn	11:35
7.	"You Keep on Moving" (Coverdale, Hughes)	Come Taste the Band, 1975	5:18
8.	"Love Child" (Coverdale, Tommy Bolin)	Come Taste the Band	3:05
9.	"Drifter" (Coverdale, Bolin)	Come Taste the Band	4:00
10.	"Perfect Strangers" (Live; Blackmore, Gillan, Glover)	Live at the Olympia '96, 1997; originally from Perfect Strangers, 1984	6:23
11.	"Ted the Mechanic" (Live; Gillan, Steve Morse, Roger Glover, Lord, Paice)	Live at the Olympia '96; originally from Purpendicular, 1996	4:33
12.	"Any Fule Kno That" (Gillan, Morse, Glover, Lord, Paice)	Abandon, 1998	4:28
13.	"Bludsucker" (1998 version of "Bloodsucker" (from Deep Purple in Rock))	Abandon	4:27
14.	"Sun Goes Down" (Gillan, Morse, Glover, Don Airey, Paice)	Bananas, 2003	4:15

== Charts ==
Chart (2005)	Peak position
Austrian Albums (Ö3 Austria)	63
Belgian Albums (Ultratop Wallonia)	67
Italian Albums (FIMI)	13
New Zealand Albums (RMNZ)	32
Swiss Albums (Schweizer Hitparade)	89
UK Albums (OCC)	39

== Certifications ==
Region	Certification	Certified units/sales
United Kingdom (BPI)	Silver	60,000^{‡}
^{‡} Sales+streaming figures based on certification alone.
