= The Songs That Built Rock Tour =

2011–12 concert tour by Deep Purple

Deep Purple: The Songs That Built Rock Tour
- Concert by Deep Purple
- Official tour banner
- Location: Europe; North America
- Start date: 3 June 2011
- End date: 10 December 2012
- Legs: 6
- No. of shows: 100

Deep Purple concert chronology
- Rapture of the Deep World Tour (2006–2011); The Songs That Built Rock Tour (2011–2012); Now What? World Tour (2013–2015)

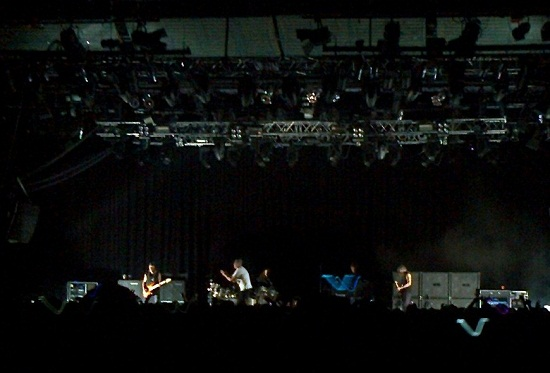
Deep Purple in Mendoza, Argentina.

The Songs That Built Rock Tour was a 2011–12 world concert tour by English hard rock band Deep Purple.

== Overview ==
Along with the band, the tour featured a 38-piece orchestra. It was the first time Deep Purple toured North America in four years. It took place at the world's largest arenas, such as the O2 Arena in London and Arena di Verona in Verona, Italy.

The official management's press-release said the show would include Deep Purple's biggest hits, such as "Smoke on the Water", Highway Star", "Woman from Tokyo" etc, covering the 42-year history of the band.

== Tour history ==
=== Announcements ===
- The first few European dates of the orchestral tour were announced in January 2011, including shows in Germany and the Arena di Verona, Italy. It was billed as just "Orchestral Tour".
- Billed as "Deep Purple: The Songs That Built Rock", the tour was officially announced at the end of February 2011, with North American dates being first, followed by European ones. The North American tour includes three show in Canada and three shows in the New York City area. (New York area concerts combine 20,000 tickets for sale.)
- At the beginning of April, Jacky Paice, the wife of Deep Purple's drummer Ian Paice, announced the 2011 edition of The Sunflower Jam, the annual charity event hosted by the actor Jeremy Irons. This edition includes Deep Purple appearing at London's Royal Albert Hall among some of the biggest names in the history of rock, such as Jon Lord, Rick Wakeman, Keith Emerson, Joe Bonamassa, Neuton Faulkner and members of the rock band Thunder. (with more names to be confirmed, as promised). The Sunflower Jam has been criticised in the British Medical Journal for fundraising in support of The College of Medicine, an alternative medicine lobby group in the UK linked to Prince Charles.
- 12 April saw the band announcing four UK arena dates, including their first ever show at London's O2 Arena.

=== Ticket sales ===
- According to Ticketmaster, on 16 April Deep Purple reached #2 in the list of week's biggest ticket-selling artists in the UK. (Download Festival being #1). The band sold nearly 70,000 tickets in two days. The fourth day of ticket sales saw them as the #1 bestseller artists of the week in the UK.
- The LG Arena show in Birmingham sold out after one week of ticket sales.

== Tour dates ==
Date	City	Country	Venue
North America
3 June 2011	Orillia	Canada	Casino Rama
4 June 2011	Quebec City	Canada	Agora
6 June 2011	Montreal	Canada	Place des Arts
7 June 2011	Boston	United States	Wang Center
8 June 2011	Hartford	United States	Bushnell Center for the Performing Arts
10 June 2011	Holmdel	United States	PNC Bank Arts Center
11 June 2011	Atlantic City	United States	Tropicana Casino & Resort Atlantic City
12 June 2011	Bethel	United States	Bethel Performing Arts Centre
14 June 2011	New York City	United States	Beacon Theatre
15 June 2011	New York City	United States	Beacon Theatre
17 June 2011	Detroit	United States	Fox Theatre
18 June 2011	Highland Park	United States	Ravinia Park
19 June 2011	Minneapolis	United States	Orpheum Theatre
23 June 2011	Paradise	United States	Palms Casino Resort
24 June 2011	Los Angeles	United States	Greek Theatre
25 June 2011	Concord	United States	Concord Pavilion
Europe
8 July 2011	London	United Kingdom	SunFlower SuperJam, Royal Albert Hall
15 July 2011	Mainz	Germany	Nordmole am Zollhafen
16 July 2011	Montreux	Switzerland	Montreux Jazz Festival, Stravinski Hall
18 July 2011	Verona	Italy	Arena di Verona
20 July 2011	Gelsenkirchen	Germany	Amphitheatre
22 July 2011	Künzelsau	Germany	Schlosspark
23 July 2011	Dresden	Germany	Elbufer
24 July 2011	Słupsk	Poland	Dolina Charlotty
27 July 2011	Vienne	France	Theatre Antique
29 July 2011	Tienen	Belgium	Suikerock Festival
South America
4 October 2011	Belém	Brazil	Cidade Folia
7 October 2011	Fortaleza	Brazil	Siara
8 October 2011	Nova Odessa	Brazil	Expo America
10 October 2011	São Paulo	Brazil	Via Funchal
11 October 2011	Belo Horizonte	Brazil	Chevrolet Hall
12 October 2011	Curitiba	Brazil	Teatro Positivo
14 October 2011	Rosario	Argentina	Metropolitano
15 October 2011	Buenos Aires	Argentina	Luna Park
16 October 2011	Buenos Aires	Argentina	Luna Park
18 October 2011	Córdoba	Argentina	Orfeo Superdomo
19 October 2011	Mendoza	Argentina	Auditorio Angel Bustelo
21 October 2011	Santiago	Chile	Movistar Arena
22 October 2011	Viña del Mar	Chile	Quinta Vergara Amphitheater
23 October 2011	Temuco	Chile	Gimnasio Olimpico UFRO
25 October 2011	Talcahuano	Chile	Coliseo Monumental La Tortuga
28 October 2011	Quito	Ecuador	Agora
Europe
26 November 2011	Glasgow	United Kingdom	SECC
27 November 2011	Birmingham	United Kingdom	LG Arena
29 November 2011	Manchester	United Kingdom	MEN Arena
30 November 2011	London	United Kingdom	O2 Arena
2 December 2011	Arnhem	Netherlands	GelreDome
3 December 2011	Halle	Germany	Gerry Weber Stadion
4 December 2011	Schwerin	Germany	Sport- und Kongresshalle
7 December 2011	Helsinki	Finland	Hartwall Areena
9 December 2011	Stockholm	Sweden	Hovet
10 December 2011	Gothenburg	Sweden	Scandinavium
13 December 2011	Oslo	Norway	Oslo Spektrum
15 December 2011	Horsens	Denmark	Forum Horsens
North America (Smoke on the Nation Tour)
2 February 2012	St. John's	Canada	Mile One Stadium
4 February 2012	Moncton	Canada	Moncton Casino
5 February 2012	Halifax	Canada	Halifax Metro Centre
6 February 2012	Moncton	Canada	Moncton Casino
8 February 2012	Ottawa	Canada	Ottawa Civic Centre
9 February 2012	Kingston	Canada	K-Rock Centre
11 February 2012	London	Canada	John Labatt Centre
12 February 2012	Toronto	Canada	Massey Hall
13 February 2012	Hamilton	Canada	Hamilton Place Theatre
15 February 2012	Winnipeg	Canada	MTS Centre
16 February 2012	Regina	Canada	Brandt Centre
17 February 2012	Saskatoon	Canada	TCU Place
19 February 2012	Calgary	Canada	Southern Alberta Jubilee Auditorium
21 February 2012	Edmonton	Canada	Rexall Place
23 February 2012	Prince George	Canada	CN Centre
25 February 2012	Victoria	Canada	Save-On-Foods Memorial Centre
26 February 2012	Vancouver	Canada	Queen Elizabeth Theatre
Europe
24 October 2012	Yekaterinburg	Russia	DIVS Arena
27 October 2012	Saint Petersburg	Russia	Ice Palace
28 October 2012	Moscow	Russia	Olympic Stadium
30 October 2012	Krasnodar	Russia	Arena
2 November 2012	Kyiv	Ukraine	Palace of Sports
8 November 2012	Esch-sur-Alzette	Luxembourg	Rockhal
9 November 2012	Grenoble	France	Palais des Sports
11 November 2012	Saint-Herblain (near Nantes)	France	Le Zénith
12 November 2012	Caen	France	Le Zénith
13 November 2012	Paris	France	Zénith de Paris-La Villette
15 November 2012	Cologne	Germany	Lanxess Arena
16 November 2012	Bremen	Germany	Halle 7
17 November 2012	Hanover	Germany	AWD Hall
20 November 2012	Kiel	Germany	Sparkassen-Arena
22 November 2012	Frankfurt	Germany	Festhalle Frankfurt
23 November 2012	Oberhausen	Germany	König Pilsener Arena
24 November 2012	Hamburg	Germany	O2 World
26 November 2012	Leipzig	Germany	Arena Leipzig
27 November 2012	Berlin	Germany	O2 World
29 November 2012	Augsburg	Germany	Schwabenhalle
30 November 2012	Munich	Germany	Olympiahalle
1 December 2012	Stuttgart	Germany	Hanns-Martin-Schleyer-Halle
3 December 2012	Brussels	Belgium	Forest National
4 December 2012	Amsterdam	Netherlands	Ziggo Dome
6 December 2012	Toulouse	France	Le Zénith
7 December 2012	Mâcon	France	Le Spot
8 December 2012	Bern	Switzerland	Bern Expo
10 December 2012	Clermont-Ferrand	France	Le Zénith

== Songs performed ==
North America 2011 (with orchestra)
1. "Deep Purple Overture" (performed by the Orchestra)
2. "Highway Star" (from Machine Head)
3. "Hard Lovin' Man" (from Deep Purple in Rock)
4. "Maybe I'm a Leo" (from Machine Head) or "Silver Tongue" (from Bananas) (4 June 2011 only)
5. "Strange Kind of Woman" (From Fireball)
6. "Rapture of the Deep" (From Rapture of the Deep)
7. "Woman from Tokyo" (from Who Do We Think We Are)
8. "Contact Lost" (from Bananas)
9. Steve Morse guitar solo
10. "When a Blind Man Cries" (from Machine Head)
11. "The Well-Dressed Guitar" (from Rapture of the Deep – Tour Edition)
12. "Knocking at Your Back Door" (from Perfect Strangers)
13. "Lazy" (from Machine Head)
14. "No One Came" (from Fireball)
15. Don Airey Keyboard solo
16. "Perfect Strangers" (from Perfect Strangers)
17. "Space Truckin'" (from Machine Head)
18. "Smoke on the Water" (from Machine Head)

Encore:

19. "Green Onions" (Booker T. & the M.G.s cover) or "Going Down" (Don Nix cover) or "Time is Tight" (Booker T. & the M.G.s cover) or other covers intros to "Hush"
20. "Hush" (from Shades of Deep Purple) (Billy Joe Royal cover) (occasionally with a drum solo)
21. Roger Glover bass solo
22. "Black Night" (from Deep Purple in Rock)
Sunflower Jam 2011 (without orchestra)
1. "Highway Star" (from Machine Head)
2. "Maybe I'm A Leo" (from Machine Head) (with Joe Bonamassa)
3. "Strange Kind of Woman" (From Fireball)
4. "Contact Lost" (from Bananas)
5. "When A Blind Man Cries" (from Machine Head)
6. "The Well-Dressed Guitar" (from Rapture of the Deep – Tour Edition)
7. "Black Night" (from Deep Purple in Rock)
8. "Smoke on the Water" (from Machine Head) (with Bill Bailey, Joe Bonamassa & Jack Moore)
Europe 2011 (with orchestra) I
1. "Deep Purple Overture" (performed by the Orchestra)
2. "Highway Star" (from Machine Head)
3. "Hard Lovin' Man" (from Deep Purple in Rock)
4. "Maybe I'm a Leo" (from Machine Head)
5. "Strange Kind of Woman" (From Fireball)
6. "Rapture of the Deep" (From Rapture of the Deep)
7. "Woman from Tokyo" (from Who Do We Think We Are)
8. "Contact Lost" (from Bananas)
9. Steve Morse guitar solo
10. "When a Blind Man Cries" (from Machine Head)
11. "The Well-Dressed Guitar" (from Rapture of the Deep – Tour Edition)
12. "Knocking at Your Back Door" (from Perfect Strangers)
13. "Lazy" (from Machine Head)
14. "No One Came" (from Fireball)
15. Don Airey Keyboard solo
16. "Perfect Strangers" (from Perfect Strangers)
17. "Space Truckin'" (from Machine Head)
18. "Smoke on the Water" (from Machine Head)

Encore:

19. "Green Onions" (Booker T. & the M.G.s cover) or "Going Down" (Don Nix cover) or "Time is Tight" (Booker T. & the M.G.s cover) or other covers intros to "Hush"
20. "Hush" (from Shades of Deep Purple) (Billy Joe Royal cover) (occasionally with a drum solo)
21. Roger Glover bass solo
22. "Black Night" (from Deep Purple in Rock)
South America 2011 (without orchestra)
1. "Deep Purple Overture" (performed by the Orchestra)
2. "Highway Star" (from Machine Head)
3. "Hard Lovin' Man" (from Deep Purple in Rock)
4. "Maybe I'm a Leo" (from Machine Head)
5. "Strange Kind of Woman" (From Fireball)
6. "Rapture of the Deep" (From Rapture of the Deep)
7. "Mary Long" or "Woman From Tokyo" (from Who Do We Think We Are)
8. "Contact Lost" (from Bananas)
9. Steve Morse guitar solo
10. "When a Blind Man Cries" (from Machine Head) or "Sometimes I Feel Like Screaming" (from Purpendicular)
11. "The Well-Dressed Guitar" (from Rapture of the Deep – Tour Edition)
12. "Knocking at Your Back Door" (from Perfect Strangers) or "Mary Long" (from Who Do We Think We Are)
13. "Lazy" (from Machine Head)
14. "No One Came" (from Fireball)
15. Don Airey Keyboard solo
16. "Perfect Strangers" (from Perfect Strangers)
17. "Space Truckin'" (from Machine Head)
18. "Smoke on the Water" (from Machine Head)

Encore:

19. "Green Onions" (Booker T. & the M.G.s cover) or "Going Down" (Don Nix cover) or "Time is Tight" (Booker T. & the M.G.s cover) or other covers intros to "Hush"
20. "Hush" (from Shades of Deep Purple) (Billy Joe Royal cover) (occasionally with a drum solo)
21. Roger Glover bass solo
22. "Black Night" (from Deep Purple in Rock)
Europe 2011 (with orchestra) II
1. "Deep Purple Overture" (performed by the Orchestra)
2. "Highway Star" (from Machine Head)
3. "Hard Lovin' Man" (from Deep Purple in Rock)
4. "Maybe I'm a Leo" (from Machine Head)
5. "Strange Kind of Woman" (From Fireball)
6. "Rapture of the Deep" (From Rapture of the Deep)
7. "Woman from Tokyo" (from Who Do We Think We Are)
8. "Contact Lost" (from Bananas)
9. Steve Morse guitar solo
10. "When a Blind Man Cries" (from Machine Head)
11. "The Well-Dressed Guitar" (from Rapture of the Deep – Tour Edition)
12. "Knocking at Your Back Door" (from Perfect Strangers) or "The Mule" (From Fireball) (with Ian Paice drum solo)
13. "Lazy" (from Machine Head)
14. "No One Came" (from Fireball)
15. Don Airey Keyboard solo
16. "Perfect Strangers" (from Perfect Strangers)
17. "Space Truckin'" (from Machine Head)
18. "Smoke on the Water" (from Machine Head)

Encore:

19. "Green Onions" (Booker T. & the M.G.s cover) or "Going Down" (Don Nix cover) or "Time is Tight" (Booker T. & the M.G.s cover) or other covers intros to "Hush"
20. "Hush" (from Shades of Deep Purple) (Billy Joe Royal cover) (occasionally with a drum solo)
21. Roger Glover bass solo
22. "Black Night" (from Deep Purple in Rock)
Europe 2012 (without orchestra)
1. Intro tape: "Dance of the Knights" (Prokofiev, arr. by Don Airey)
2. "Fireball" (From Fireball)
3. "Into The Fire" (from Deep Purple in Rock)
4. "Hard Lovin' Man" (from Deep Purple in Rock)
5. "Maybe I'm a Leo" (from Machine Head)
6. "Strange Kind of Woman" (From Fireball)
7. "The Battle Rages On" (from The Battle Rages On...)
8. "Contact Lost" (from Bananas)
9. Steve Morse guitar solo
10. "Wasted Sunsets" (from Perfect Strangers) or "Sometimes I Feel Like Screaming" (from Purpendicular) or "When a Blind Man Cries" (from Machine Head)
11. "The Well-Dressed Guitar" (from Rapture of the Deep – Tour Edition)
12. "The Mule" (From Fireball) (with Ian Paice drum solo)
13. "Lazy" (from Machine Head)
14. "No One Came" (From Fireball)
15. Don Airey keyboard solo
16. "Perfect Strangers" (from Perfect Strangers)
17. "Space Truckin'" (from Machine Head)
18. "Smoke on the Water" (from Machine Head)

Encore :

19. "Highway Star" (from Machine Head) (first two gigs in Russia only) or "Speed King" (from Deep Purple in Rock) (in some shows at the end of the tour)
20. "Green Onions" (Booker T. & the M.G.s cover) or "Going Down" (Don Nix cover) or "Time is Tight" (Booker T. & the M.G.s cover) or other cover intros to "Hush" (not for the shows where "Highway Star" or "Speed King" were played)
21. "Hush" (Billy Joe Royal cover) (from Shades of Deep Purple)
22. Roger Glover bass solo
23. "Black Night" (from Deep Purple in Rock)

== Line-up ==
Deep Purple

- Ian Gillan – vocals
- Steve Morse – guitar
- Roger Glover – bass
- Ian Paice – drums
- Don Airey – keyboards

Other

- The 38-piece Orchestra, Europe tour: Neue Philharmonie Frankfurt
- The Sunflower Superjam 2011 line up includes Jon Lord, Rick Wakeman, Keith Emerson, Joe Bonamassa, Newton Faulkner, alongside Deep Purple

== Notes ==
- Concord, California concert on 25 June 2011 is without the Orchestra, guest Joe Satriani plays the guitar on "Smoke on the Water"
- The SunFlower SuperJam concert on 8 July 2011 is without the orchestra and with guests Jack Moore, the son of Gary Moore on guitar, Bill Bailey on cowbell and Joe Bonamassa on guitar on "Smoke on the Water", Joe Bonamassa also played guitar on "Maybe I'm a Leo"
- Montreux, Switzerland concert on 16 July has been recorded and was released on DVD and CD as Live at Montreux 2011 on 7 November 2011
- The Słupsk concert "Rock Legends Festival" on 24 July 2011 is without the Orchestra
- The South American concerts in October 2011, the concerts in Canada in February 2012 and the final European Concerts in October, November and December 2012 were played without the orchestra.
