= Classic Albums: Deep Purple – The Making of Machine Head =

- DVD cover
- Directed by: Matthew Longfellow
- Produced by: Nick de Grunwald; Martin R. Smith
- Starring: Deep Purple
- Edited by: Matthew Longfellow
- Music by: Deep Purple
- Distributed by: Isis Productions; Eagle Rock Entertainment
- Release date: 27 November 2002
- Running time: 100 minutes
- Country: United Kingdom
- Language: English

Classic Albums: Deep Purple – The Making of Machine Head is a DVD documentary about the making of the Machine Head album by Deep Purple. It is part of the Classic Albums series, released by Isis Productions/Eagle Rock Entertainment. The DVD does manage to unite the band under one single film, however this is only achieved via separate interviews at various locations. It also features interviews with the album's engineer Martin Birch and music journalists.

== Chapter Selection ==
1. Introduction
2. "Highway Star"
3. "Smoke on the Water"
4. "Pictures of Home"
5. "Space Truckin' "
6. "Never Before"
7. "When a Blind Man Cries"

== Bonus Interviews ==
1. No Smoke Without Fire
2. The Beast
3. Make Everything Louder
4. "Black Night"
5. Keep on Space Truckin'
6. "Maybe I'm a Leo"'s Off Beat
7. Break a Leg, Frank
8. Roger's Machine Head
9. "Never Before" Original 1972 Promo

== Certifications ==
Region	Certification	Certified units/sales
Australia (ARIA)	Gold	7,500^{^}
^{^} Shipments figures based on certification alone.
