= Live at The Olympia '96 =

Live at the Olympia '96

Live album by Deep Purple
- Released: 9 June 1997
- Recorded: 17 June 1996
- Venue: The Olympia, Paris, France
- Genre: Hard rock, heavy metal
- Length: 122:40
- Label: Thames

Deep Purple live albums chronology
Mk III: The Final Concerts (1996)	Live at the Olympia '96 (1997)	Total Abandon: Australia '99 (1999)

Professional ratings
Review scores
Source	Rating
AllMusic	4/5 stars

Live at the Olympia '96 is a live double album by English hard rock band Deep Purple. It was recorded at the Olympia in Paris on 17 June 1996 during the Purpendicular tour and released in 1997.

Initial copies of the release have a round sticker on the front of the CD jewel-case, stating 'Official Bootleg'.

It is one of only three Deep Purple live albums to feature a performance of "Maybe I'm a Leo", the others being Deep Purple in Concert and Live at Montreux 2011.

== Track listing ==
All tracks are written by Ian Gillan, Ritchie Blackmore, Roger Glover, Jon Lord and Ian Paice except where noted.

Disc one
No.	Title	Length
1.	"Fireball"	5:01
2.	"Maybe I'm a Leo"	5:53
3.	"Ted the Mechanic" (Gillan, Steve Morse, Glover, Lord, Paice)	5:06
4.	"Pictures of Home"	5:58
5.	"Black Night"	7:33
6.	"Cascades: I'm Not Your Lover" (Gillan, Morse, Glover, Lord, Paice)	11:04
7.	"Sometimes I Feel Like Screaming" (Gillan, Morse, Glover, Lord, Paice)	7:24
8.	"Woman from Tokyo"	6:29
9.	"No One Came"	5:53
10.	"The Purpendicular Waltz" (Gillan, Morse, Glover, Lord, Paice)	5:11

Disc two
No.	Title	Length
1.	"Rosa's Cantina" (Gillan, Morse, Glover, Lord, Paice)	6:18
2.	"Smoke on the Water"	9:24
3.	"When a Blind Man Cries"	7:17
4.	"Speed King"	11:45
5.	"Perfect Strangers" (Blackmore, Gillan, Glover)	6:43
6.	"Hey Cisco" (Gillan, Morse, Glover, Lord, Paice)	7:27
7.	"Highway Star"	8:08

== Personnel ==
Deep Purple

- Ian Gillan – vocals, harmonica
- Steve Morse – guitars
- Roger Glover – bass
- Jon Lord – organ, keyboards
- Ian Paice – drums

Additional musicians

Featured on "Highway Star", "Cascades: I'm Not Your Lover", "No One Came", "The Purpendicular Waltz"

- Vincent Chavagnac – saxophone
- Christian Fourquet – trombone
- Eric Mula – trumpet

Production

- Alain Francais – engineer
- Darren Schneider – premixing at Greg Rike Productions, Florida
- Rory Young – digital editing
- Peter Deneberg – digital editing, mixing at Acme Studios, Mamaroneck, New York

== Charts ==
Chart (1997)	Peak position
German Albums Chart	98
UK Albums Chart	183
