= Live at Montreux 2011 =

Album by Deep Purple

Live album by Deep Purple
- Released: 7 November 2011
- Recorded: 16 July 2011 in Montreux, Vaud, Switzerland
- Genre: Hard rock, heavy metal
- Length: 115:00
- Label: Eagle

Deep Purple live albums chronology
Live at Montreux 2006: They All Came Down to Montreux (2007)	Live at Montreux 2011 (2011)	BBC Sessions 1968–1970 (2011)

Live at Montreux 2011

Video by Deep Purple
- Released: 7 November 2011
- Recorded: 16 July 2011 in Montreux
- Genre: Hard rock, heavy metal
- Length: 180 minutes
- Label: Eagle Rock Entertainment

Deep Purple chronology
Phoenix Rising (2011)	Live at Montreux 2011 (2011)

Live at Montreux 2011 is a live release by English hard rock band Deep Purple's MK VIII lineup credited as Deep Purple with Orchestra, and performed alongside the Neue Philharmonie Frankfurt conducted by Stephen Bentley-Klein. This concert was recorded at the Montreux Jazz Festival on 16 July 2011. Besides a 2CD release, the concert film has also been released on DVD and Blu-ray. All formats were released on 7 November 2011 by German label Eagle Rock Entertainment. In 2015 a vinyl collector's edition of the album was released for a Record Store Day.

== Track listing ==
All songs written by Ritchie Blackmore, Ian Gillan, Roger Glover, Jon Lord, and Ian Paice except where noted.

=== 2CD ===
==== Disc one ====
1. "Deep Purple Overture" (Stephen Bentley-Klein, Jack Bruce, Pete Brown, Eric Clapton, Blackmore, Gillan, Glover, Lord, Paice) – 1:39
2. "Highway Star" – 6:54
3. "Hard Lovin' Man" – 6:08
4. "Maybe I'm a Leo" – 4:30
5. "Strange Kind of Woman" – 6:19
6. "Rapture of the Deep" (Gillan, Steve Morse, Roger Glover, Don Airey, Paice) – 5:44
7. "Woman from Tokyo" – 6:18
8. "Contact Lost" (Morse) – 4:28
9. "When a Blind Man Cries" – 3:50
10. "The Well Dressed Guitar" (Morse) – 2:42

==== Disc two ====
1. "Knocking at Your Back Door" (Blackmore, Gillan, Glover) – 6:07
2. "Lazy" – 8:45
3. "No One Came" – 5:40
4. "Keyboards Solo" (Airey) – 5:45
5. "Perfect Strangers" (Gillan, Blackmore, Glover) – 6:05
6. "Space Truckin'" – 4:55
7. "Smoke on the Water" – 8:32
8. "Green Onions" (Steve Cropper, Al Jackson, Lewie Steinberg, Booker T. Jones)/Hush (Joe South)/Bass solo" (Glover) – 8:18
9. "Black Night" – 7:10

=== DVD/Blu-ray ===
1. "Deep Purple Overture/Highway Star"
2. "Hard Lovin' Man"
3. "Maybe I'm a Leo"
4. "Strange Kind of Woman"
5. "Rapture of the Deep"
6. "Woman from Tokyo"
7. "Contact Lost"
8. "When a Blind Man Cries"
9. "The Well-Dressed Guitar"
10. "Knocking at Your Back Door"
11. "Lazy"
12. "No One Came"
13. "Don Airey Keyboard Solo"
14. "Perfect Strangers"
15. "Space Truckin'"
16. "Smoke on the Water"
17. "Hush" (South)
18. "Black Night"

Bonus feature

- Interview with Deep Purple

== Personnel ==
Deep Purple

- Ian Gillan – lead vocals, harmonica
- Steve Morse – guitars, backing vocals on "Hush"
- Roger Glover – bass
- Ian Paice – drums
- Don Airey – keyboards

with

- Neue Philharmonie Frankfurt
- Stephen Bentley-Klein – conductor

== Production notes ==
- Live sound mixed and recorded by David Richards at Mountain Studios, in Le Voyageur I
- Audio mixed by Julie Gardner at Jam Studios, London
- Audio mastered by Mazen Murad at Metropolitan Studios, London

== Chart performance ==
Chart performance for Live at Montreux 2011
Chart (2011)	Peak position
Swiss Albums (Schweizer Hitparade)	7
German Albums (Offizielle Top 100)	43

== See also ==
- Live at Montreux 1996
- Live at Montreux 2006
