= Re-Machined: A Tribute to Deep Purple's Machine Head =

Compilation album by Various artists
- Released: September 25, 2012
- Genre: Hard rock, heavy metal, blues rock
- Label: Eagle Rock Entertainment
- Producer: Kevin Shirley, Glenn Hughes, Howard Benson, Mike Fraser, Zakk Wylde, Matt Sorum, the Flaming Lips, Greg Fidelman, Fabrizio Grossi

Re-Machined: A Tribute to Deep Purple's Machine Head is a 2012 tribute album that features a variety of hard rock and heavy metal bands covering songs written by Deep Purple. Groups on the multi-artist collection include Black Label Society and Iron Maiden among others. Picking up some commercial success, the work hit the #41 slot on Billboard Top Independent Albums chart and additionally received critical praise from publications such as Allmusic.

As part of the 40th anniversary celebrations of Deep Purple's 1972 release Machine Head, Re-Machined was released on September 25, 2012, by Eagle Rock Entertainment.

== Recording ==
Re-Machined features mostly specially recorded tracks from former Deep Purple Mk III member Glenn Hughes with Chad Smith of Red Hot Chili Peppers, Iron Maiden, Metallica, Chickenfoot, Steve Vai, Black Label Society, Carlos Santana and Papa Roach vocalist Jacoby Shaddix - their version of "Smoke on the Water" has previously been released on the Santana album Guitar Heaven, Jimmy Barnes & Joe Bonamassa, and the supergroup Kings of Chaos featuring Def Leppard vocalist Joe Elliott, Steve Stevens, and former Guns N' Roses members Duff McKagan and Matt Sorum.

There are two wildly differing versions of the album's most famous track "Smoke on the Water", one from Carlos Santana with vocals by Jacoby Shaddix and one from Flaming Lips, and Metallica have contributed their own special take on "When A Blind Man Cries", a track recorded at the Machine Head sessions, but originally released as the B-side to "Never Before".

== Reception ==
Since its release, the album has been met with mostly positive reviews. William Clark of Guitar International said, "This Remachined Tribute is a re-launch of one of the very best albums of all time and one that fields such a diverse and amazing set of guitar talents that I have no reservations – none – recommending this to followers of Deep Purple".

== Track listing ==
All tracks are written by Ritchie Blackmore, Ian Gillan, Roger Glover, Jon Lord & Ian Paice

No.	Title	Artist	Length
1.	"Smoke on the Water"	Carlos Santana, Jacoby Shaddix	5:05
2.	"Highway Star" (Live)	Chickenfoot	7:05
3.	"Maybe I'm a Leo"	Glenn Hughes & Chad Smith	4:59
4.	"Pictures of Home"	Black Label Society	3:30
5.	"Never Before"	Kings of Chaos	4:05
6.	"Smoke on the Water"	The Flaming Lips & Gibby Haynes	4:25
7.	"Lazy"	Jimmy Barnes, Brad Whitford & Joe Bonamassa	8:53
8.	"Space Truckin'"	Iron Maiden	3:27
9.	"When a Blind Man Cries"	Metallica	4:37

Classic Rock Magazine Fan Pack / North American / Australian bonus track
No.	Title	Artist	Length
10.	"Highway Star"	Glenn Hughes, Steve Vai & Chad Smith	6:18

Japan Exclusive Bonus DVD
No.	Title	Artist	Length
1.	"Interviews & Making"	Various artists
2.	"Highway Star"	Chickenfoot
3.	"Lazy"	Jimmy Barnes, Joe Bonamassa

== See also ==
- Various – Re-Machined A Tribute To Deep Purple's Machine Head (credits by track)
- 2012 in American music / 2012 in British music
