= Kings of Chaos (band) =

International hard rock supergroup

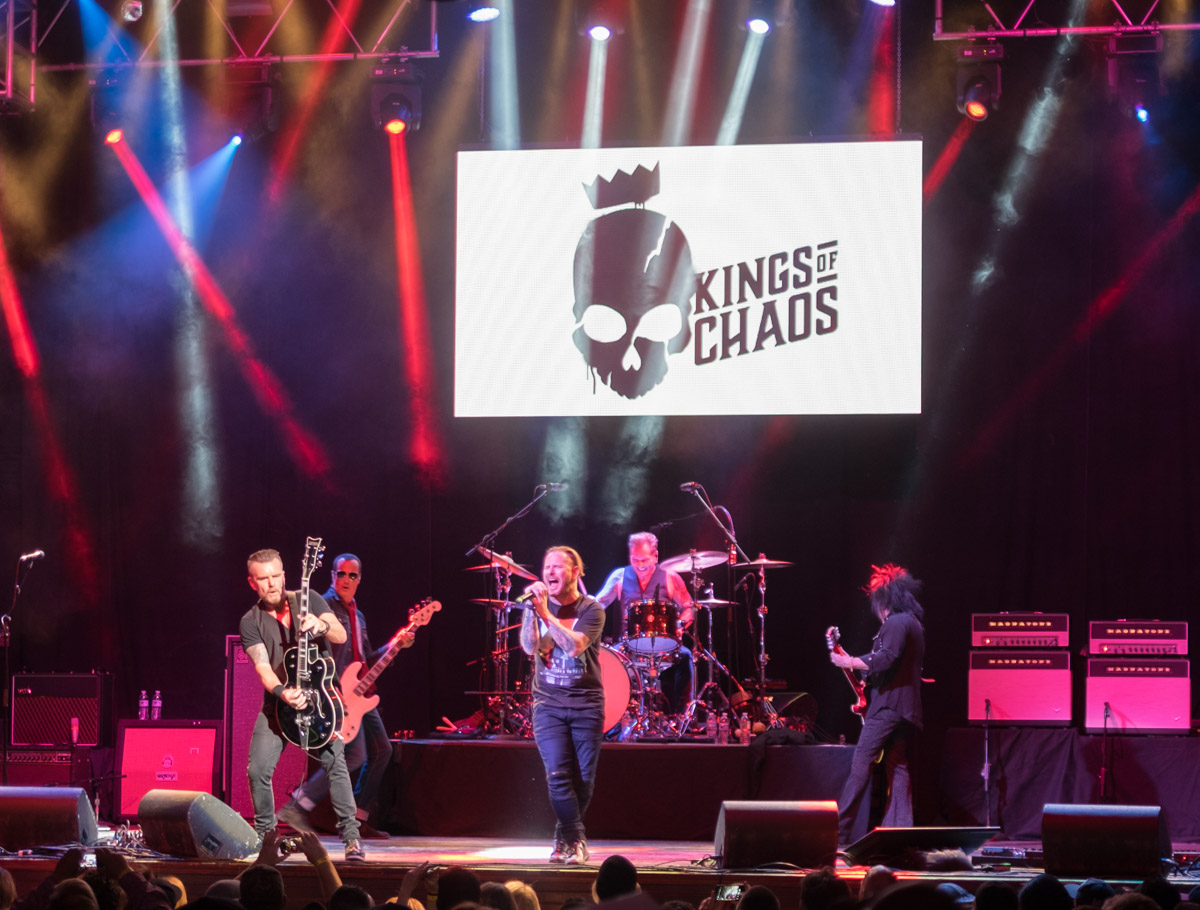
- Kings of Chaos performing at the House of Blues in Las Vegas in December 2016

Background information
- Also known as: Rock N Roll All-Stars
- Genres: Rock, hard rock
- Years active: 2012–present
- Spinoff of: Guns N' Roses; Bon Jovi; Velvet Revolver; Aerosmith; ZZ Top; Cheap Trick; Extreme; Def Leppard; Billy Idol; Skid Row; Deep Purple; Linkin Park
- Members: Matt Sorum; Steve Stevens; Billy Duffy; Robert DeLeo; Richie Sambora; Phil X
- Past members: Myles Kennedy; Sebastian Bach; Gilby Clarke; Joe Elliott; Glenn Hughes; Duff McKagan; Slash; Nuno Bettencourt; Ed Roland; Dave Kushner; Steven Tyler; Billy Gibbons; Robin Zander; Chester Bennington; Corey Taylor
- Website: kingsofchaosband.com

Kings of Chaos is a hard rock supergroup with international membership featuring a core lineup of drummer Matt Sorum, bassist Duff McKagan, and guitarist Gilby Clarke (all then formerly of Guns N' Roses), as well as revolving appearances from members of Bon Jovi, Def Leppard, Deep Purple, Aerosmith and more. The group plays songs from all of these bands, and other classic rock covers. To date, they have only recorded and released two songs, "Never Before", on the Deep Purple tribute, Re-Machined: A Tribute to Deep Purple's Machine Head, and original song "Judgement Day".

== History ==
The band was formerly known as the Rock N Roll All-Stars, which had a short tour of South America in 2012. Since their reincarnation as the Kings of Chaos, the band have played Australia's Stone Music Fest, four shows in South Africa, one show in the United States, and two in Latin America.

The supergroup has previously stated that they would be releasing EPs in the future that would each contain 3 covers and an original track, but this has yet to happen.

The band always plays a setlist of songs from the bands of the members, and generally another few cover songs. Most prominent throughout are the Guns N' Roses classics, "Sweet Child o' Mine", "Paradise City" and "Welcome to the Jungle", Def Leppard's "Pour Some Sugar on Me" and Deep Purple's "Highway Star."

One of the significant points to the Kings of Chaos is that they at one point had 4 members of the 1993 version of Guns N' Roses, and 2 original members. At the time, this was a higher number than the then-current incarnation of Guns N' Roses itself. The core line-up however includes original GNR member, Duff McKagan, KOC founder Matt Sorum who played with GNR from 1990-1997, and Gilby Clarke, who played for GNR from 1991 to 1994.

On August 19, 2014, Kings of Chaos announced a 2014 South African Tour with two scheduled dates that included Robin Zander of Cheap Trick, Billy Gibbons of ZZ Top, Nuno Bettencourt of Extreme, and Steven Tyler of Aerosmith as a special guest. They were not joined by longtime members Joe Elliott and Glenn Hughes who both had other side projects that they were working on.

On November 4, 2014, Kings of Chaos played at Classic Rock Roll of Honour Awards at the Avalon in Hollywood, with special guest Joe Perry. They were also joined on stage by Brian May.

On October 27, 2022, Sorum announced the band's debut album would be releasing digitally in the latter half of 2023 via AFM Records. Alongside the announcement, the band also released the single "Judgement Day".

On April 15, 2023, Kings of Chaos headlined at the Grand Prix of Long Beach with guest appearances from vocalists Corey Taylor of Slipknot, Corey Glover and Vernon Reid from Living Colour, Lzzy Hale, lead vocalist-guitarist of rock band Halestorm, and Rome Ramirez of Long Beach’s Sublime.

== Members ==
The band is not meant to have a permanent lineup, and has thus had its fair share of personnel changes. At its core, playing every show with both the Kings of Chaos and Rock N Roll All-Stars, were the former Guns N' Roses members, Matt Sorum, Duff McKagan, and Gilby Clarke. This changed in December 2016 when Kings of Chaos played its first show without McKagan and Clarke. In August 2026, Bon Jovi's former and current guitarists, Richie Sambora and Phil X, played with the supergroup.

=== Lineups ===
April 2012 "Rock 'N' Roll All-Stars"	20 April 2013 Stone Music Fest, Australia	June 2013 South African Tour
Matt Sorum – drums; Duff McKagan – bass guitar, backing vocals; Gilby Clarke – guitar, backing vocals; Joe Elliott – lead vocals; Glenn Hughes – lead vocals, backing vocals; Sebastian Bach – lead vocals; Gene Simmons – lead vocals, bass guitar; Ed Roland – lead vocals; Steve Stevens – guitar, backing vocals; Billy Duffy – guitar, backing vocals; Mike Inez – bass guitar, backing vocals	Matt Sorum – drums; Duff McKagan – bass guitar, backing vocals; Gilby Clarke – guitar, backing vocals; Joe Elliott – lead vocals, acoustic guitar, backing vocals; Glenn Hughes – lead vocals, acoustic guitar, backing vocals; Sebastian Bach – lead vocals, backing vocals; Steve Stevens – guitar, backing vocals	Matt Sorum – drums; Duff McKagan – bass guitar, backing vocals; Gilby Clarke – guitar, backing vocals; Joe Elliott – lead vocals, acoustic guitar, backing vocals; Glenn Hughes – lead vocals, acoustic guitar, backing vocals; Myles Kennedy – lead vocals; Slash – guitar, backing vocals; Ed Roland – lead vocals; Dave Kushner – guitar, backing vocals
18 November 2013 Dolphin Project Benefit, Avalon Hollywood	November 2013 Central American Tour	5 November 2014 Classic Rock Awards, Avalon Hollywood
Matt Sorum – drums; Duff McKagan – bass guitar, backing vocals; Gilby Clarke – guitar, backing vocals; Glenn Hughes – lead vocals, backing vocals; Steve Stevens – guitar, backing vocals; Slash – guitar, backing vocals; Corey Taylor – lead vocals; Guests: Franky Perez – lead vocals; Juliette Lewis – lead vocals; Les Stroud – harmonica; Billy Ray Cyrus – lead vocals	Matt Sorum – drums; Duff McKagan – bass guitar, backing vocals; Gilby Clarke – guitar, backing vocals; Joe Elliott – lead vocals, backing vocals; Glenn Hughes – lead vocals, backing vocals, tambourine; Steve Stevens – guitar, backing vocals; Myles Kennedy – lead vocals; Slash – guitar, backing vocals; Corey Taylor – lead vocals	Matt Sorum – drums; Duff McKagan – bass guitar, backing vocals; Gilby Clarke – guitar, backing vocals; Joe Elliott – lead vocals, backing vocals; Nuno Bettencourt – guitar, backing vocals; Billy Gibbons – lead vocals, guitar; Sammy Hagar – lead vocals; Guests: Brian May – guitar; Joe Perry – guitar
November - December 2014 South African Tour	27 February 2015 Private event, Vail, Colorado	May 2015 North American Tour
Matt Sorum – drums; Duff McKagan – bass guitar, backing vocals; Gilby Clarke – guitar, backing vocals; Nuno Bettencourt – guitar, backing vocals; Billy Gibbons – lead vocals, guitar; Steven Tyler – lead vocals, piano; Robin Zander – lead vocals, guitar	Matt Sorum – drums; Duff McKagan – bass guitar, backing vocals; Gilby Clarke – guitar, backing vocals; Billy Gibbons – lead vocals, guitar; Robin Zander – lead vocals, guitar; Steve Stevens – guitar, backing vocals	Matt Sorum – drums; Duff McKagan – bass guitar, backing vocals; Gilby Clarke – guitar, backing vocals; Glenn Hughes – lead vocals, backing vocals; Billy Gibbons – lead vocals, guitar; Robin Zander – lead vocals, guitar; Steve Stevens – guitar, backing vocals
29 July 2015 Dolphin Project Benefit, Fillmore San Francisco	October 2015 Canadian Tour	September 2016–July 2017? North America
Matt Sorum – drums; Duff McKagan – bass guitar, backing vocals; Gilby Clarke – guitar, backing vocals; Glenn Hughes – lead vocals, backing vocals; Steve Stevens – guitar, backing vocals; Myles Kennedy – lead vocals; Slash – guitar, backing vocals; Billy Duffy – guitar, backing vocals; Doug Aldrich – guitar, backing vocals; Sammy Hagar – lead vocals	Matt Sorum – drums; Duff McKagan – bass guitar, backing vocals; Gilby Clarke – guitar, backing vocals; Robin Zander – lead vocals, guitar; Steve Stevens – guitar, backing vocals; Sebastian Bach – lead vocals	Matt Sorum – drums; Steve Stevens – guitar, backing vocals; Billy Duffy – guitar, backing vocals; Corey Taylor – lead vocals; Billy Gibbons – guitar, lead vocals; Chester Bennington – lead vocals; Robert DeLeo – bass guitar, backing vocals
