= Deep Purple in Concert =

Live album by Deep Purple
- Released: 1 December 1980
- Recorded: 19 February 1970, 9 March 1972
- Venues: BBC Studios (1970); Paris Theatre, London (1972)
- Genre: Hard rock
- Length: 117:00 (Original 2LP); 130:25 (2001 2CD edition)
- Labels: Harvest Records (UK); Portrait Records (US); Purple Records (Ireland)
- Producers: Jeff Griffin (1970); Pete Dauncey (1972)

Deep Purple live albums chronology
Last Concert in Japan (1977)	Deep Purple in Concert (1980)	Live in London (1982)

Professional ratings
Review scores
Source	Rating
AllMusic	4/5 stars

Deep Purple in Concert is a live album by the English hard rock band Deep Purple, recorded by the BBC for their "In Concert" live series in 1970 and 1972. First released in 1980 in the UK, with the current US edition being made available in 2001.

== Album content ==
Sides 1 and 2 of the LP (later the first CD) feature the live recording from the BBC Studios in London on 19 February 1970; the band stepped in at the last minute for Joe Cocker, who cancelled his scheduled appearance. DJ John Peel introduced the tracks as they were performed. Sides 3 and 4 of the LP (later the second CD) are the gig from 9 March 1972, this time with DJ Mike Harding as compere. The latter recording features the only known live recording of "Never Before" (it was out as a single at the time) and a rare Mk II line-up (Ian Gillan, Ritchie Blackmore, Jon Lord, Roger Glover and Ian Paice) offering of "Maybe I'm a Leo". These two songs were played instead of the usual "Child in Time" to promote the new forthcoming album Machine Head, released at the end of that month (March, 1972).

"Smoke on the Water" (the first ever live performance) and "Maybe I'm a Leo" were not included on the original double LP vinyl release in 1980, although "Smoke on the Water" was made available as a single release. The vinyl was housed in a gatefold-sleeve with photo-liners.

BBC Sessions 1968–1970 collects earlier studio sessions Deep Purple recorded for the BBC.

== Reissues ==
The track lengths on many of the 2001 reissues are incorrect.

In 2004, the contents of the second disc were remastered and released on SACD as Live on the BBC, on Audio Fidelity, with two bonus tracks (studio versions of "Hush" and "River Deep Mountain High").

In 2012, the contents of the second disc were remixed and released as In Concert '72, with the original set list in its correct order for the first time. It was not quite the full recording, as some between-song chat was cut, presumably for timing purposes. No music was lost.

== Track listing ==
All songs written by Ritchie Blackmore, Ian Gillan, Roger Glover, Jon Lord and Ian Paice except where indicated.

=== Original EMI double vinyl LP ===
Side one: 1970
No.	Title	Length
1.	"Speed King"	6:20
2.	"Wring That Neck" (Blackmore, Lord, Paice, Nick Simper)	18:30

Side two: 1970
No.	Title	Length
1.	"Child in Time"	10:12
2.	"Mandrake Root" (Blackmore, Rod Evans, Lord)	17:20

Side three: 1972
No.	Title	Length
1.	"Highway Star"	6:29
2.	"Strange Kind of Woman"	8:34
3.	"Lazy"	8:57
4.	"Never Before"	3:48

Side four: 1972
No.	Title	Length
1.	"Space Truckin'"	22:14
2.	"Lucille" (Al Collins, Richard Penniman)	6:20

=== Subsequent 2CD reissues ===
Disc one: 1970
No.	Title	Length
1.	"Speed King"	7:22
2.	"Child in Time"	12:12
3.	"Wring That Neck" (Blackmore, Lord, Paice, Nick Simper)	18:59
4.	"Mandrake Root" (Blackmore, Rod Evans, Lord)	17:38

Disc two: 1972
No.	Title	Length
1.	"Highway Star"	8:32
2.	"Strange Kind of Woman"	9:17
3.	"Maybe I'm a Leo"	6:17
4.	"Never Before"	4:34
5.	"Lazy"	11:08
6.	"Space Truckin'"	21:46
7.	"Smoke on the Water"	7:09
8.	"Lucille" (Al Collins, Richard Penniman)	7:21

Disc two: 1972, remixed and re-released in 2012 as in Concert '72
No.	Title	Length
1.	"Introduction"	0:16
2.	"Highway Star"	7:41
3.	"Strange Kind of Woman"	9:32
4.	"Maybe I'm a Leo"	5:35
5.	"Smoke on the Water"	7:32
6.	"Never Before"	5:18
7.	"Lazy"	9:21
8.	"Space Truckin'"	22:11
9.	"Encore: Lucille" (Al Collins, Richard Penniman)	7:32
10.	"Soundcheck: Maybe I'm a Leo"	4:32

Singles
No.	Title	Release date	Length
1.	"Black Night/Speed King"	July 1980
2.	"Smoke on the Water/Bird Has Flown/Grabsplatter"	October 1980

"Speed King" and "Smoke on the Water" are on this CD release
"Black Night", "Bird Has Flown" and "Grabsplatter" can be found on Listen, Learn, Read On

== Personnel ==
Deep Purple

- Ritchie Blackmore – guitars
- Ian Gillan – vocals
- Roger Glover – bass guitar
- Jon Lord – Hammond organ
- Ian Paice – drums

Sides 1 and 2 of the LP (later the first CD) were recorded on 19 February 1970 at the BBC Studios for "The Sunday Show"

- Produced by Jeff Griffin
- Engineered by Tony Wilson
- Mono recording reprocessed for stereo

Sides 3 and 4 of the LP (later the second CD) were recorded on 9 March 1972 at the Paris Theatre in London for "BBC Sounds of the Seventies"

- Produced by Pete Dauncey
- Engineered by Adrian Revill
- Editing by Nick Tauber
- Mixed from original 8-track master tapes in 1980 by Nick Tauber

== Charts ==
Chart (1980)	Peak position
Japanese Albums (Oricon)	36
New Zealand Albums (RMNZ)	44
UK Albums (Official Charts)	30
