= Warner Premium Sound =

Warner Premium Sound is series of 2011 hybrid multichannel-stereo Super Audio CD/CD releases, which an important development in the format war between Super Audio CDs (SACDs) and DVD-Audio discs. It marks the first time that the Warner Music Group has released titles in the SACD format; previously they had endorsed the DVD-Audio format. In a parallel development in the United States, four albums by the Doors, titles strongly associated with the Warner Music Group, are also to be released on hybrid multichannel-stereo SACDs by Analogue Productions. Also Mobile Fidelity have been issuing and continue to be issuing SACDs of the Warner catalogue, but in the past these have been stereo-only discs, and for their new releases they do not specify whether a given disc might have multichannel contents also.

Super Audio CD/CD hybrid discs contain both an SACD layer and a standard CD layer. For the SACD layer, the recording is converted into a DSD file instead of the PCM Linear that ordinary CDs use. The DSD coding has a sampling rate of 64 times the CD Audio sampling rates of 44.1 kHz, for a rate of 2.8224 MHz (1 bit times 64 times 44.1 kHz).

The SACDs in the Warner Premium Sound series all include Direct Stream Digital or DSD coding of music with both a 5.1 surround sound and a stereo mix, as well as an ordinary Compact Disc or CD coding with a stereo mix, on separate layers; that is, they are hybrid multichannel-stereo discs. Thus these discs can be played on any CD player, although the playback of the DSD contents, most importantly multichannel mix, the require a Super Audio CD compatible player. So far this series comprises ten rock and pop record albums, most of which have previously been available in the DVD-Audio format in North America.

Included in the SACDs in this series are the full English lyrics of each album, and also Japanese translations of the lyrics.

== Background ==
Most of the releases have previously been available on DVD-Audio in the United States, although at least the Deep Purple album Machine Head has previously been released in the SACD format by EMI in Europe. Some of these new releases were released as 4-channel quadraphonic LP records in the 1970s, although such plans for albums as Hotel California by The Eagles, which had been mixed for a quadraphonic release, were dropped following the demise of that format.

The DVD-Audio and the SACD formats have been involved in a format war since the late 1990s. DVD-Audio had been endorsed by the Warner Music Group, while the SACD format had been endorsed by Sony and Universal Music Group, with an especially high profile by Virgin Records of the Universal Music Group, most notably for the back catalogue of the all but one of the Genesis studio albums and for Mike Oldfield’s Tubular Bells. (Virgin has not rights for the first Genesis album, From Genesis to Revelation.) EMI has wavered between the two, with titles existing in both formats. These include Machine Head by Deep Purple on SACD and such titles as A Night At The Opera by Queen and the Beatles compilation Love on DVD-Audio. The decision on the latter may have reflected the fact that it is a soundtrack for a show that is presented in Las Vegas in surround sound, and thus has an important market in North America (see below).

For some reason, Sony failed to promote SACDs actively in North America, with the result that DVD-Audios more or less reigned in the surround music market in there. Elsewhere, though, such as in Europe or Japan, SACDs have gained more foothold. The significance of the Warner Premium Sound series in this format war is that the Warner Music Group apparently has decided that the SACD market in Japan is too large to be insignificant, and this has led to the launch of this series of SACD releases. The format war, however, is not over and done with, as some new DVD-Audio titles still continue to emerge in the rock genre, most notably the back catalogue of King Crimson.

== List of titles in the series ==
- Titles released on 17 August 2011
  - Chicago V (1972) by Chicago
  - Fragile (1971) by Yes
  - Hotel California (1976) by The Eagles
  - Machine Head (1972) by Deep Purple
  - What’s New (1983) by Linda Ronstadt
- Titles released on 14 September 2011
  - The Captain and Me (1973) by The Doobie Brothers
  - The Doors (1967) by The Doors
  - 4 (1981) by Foreigner
  - The Nightfly (1982) by Donald Fagen
  - Rumours (1977) by Fleetwood Mac
