= The Early Years (Deep Purple album) =

Compilation album by Deep Purple
- Released: 1 March 2004
- Recorded: 1968–1969
- Genre: Hard rock, progressive rock, psychedelic rock
- Length: 77:05
- Label: EMI
- Producer: Derek Lawrence

Deep Purple compilations chronology
Winning Combinations: Deep Purple and Rainbow (2003)	The Early Years (2004)	The Platinum Collection (2005)

Professional ratings
Review scores
Source	Rating
AllMusic	3/5 stars

The Early Years is a 2004 compilation album by the English hard rock band Deep Purple. This is a compilation of material released in 1968 and 1969 and includes unreleased mixes and new mixes of tracks from the same period.

== Track listing ==
1. "And the Address" (remix) (Ritchie Blackmore, Jon Lord) – 4:33
2. "Hush" (monitor mix) (Joe South) – 4:11
3. "Mandrake Root" (Blackmore, Rod Evans, Lord) – 6:09
4. "I'm So Glad" (remix) (Skip James) – 6:19
5. "Hey Joe" (remix) (Billy Roberts) – 7:13
6. "Kentucky Woman" (alternate take) (Neil Diamond) – 5:30
7. "Listen, Learn, Read On" (Blackmore, Evans, Lord, Ian Paice) – 4:01
8. "Shield" (Blackmore, Evans, Lord) – 6:03
9. "Wring That Neck" (BBC session) (Blackmore, Lord, Nick Simper, Paice) – 4:40
10. "Anthem" (Evans, Lord) – 6:28
11. "The Bird Has Flown" (Evans, Blackmore, Lord) – 5:32
12. "Blind" (remix) (Lord) – 5:28
13. "Why Didn't Rosemary?" (Blackmore, Lord, Evans, Simper, Paice) – 5:01
14. "Lalena" (instrumental version) (Donovan) – 5:09

== Personnel ==
=== Deep Purple ===
- Ritchie Blackmore – guitars
- Rod Evans – lead vocals
- Jon Lord – organ, keyboards, backing vocals
- Ian Paice – drums
- Nick Simper – bass, backing vocals

=== Additional personnel ===
- Produced by Derek Lawrence
- Engineered by Barry Ainsworth
- Digitally remastered and remixed by Peter Mew at Abbey Road Studios, London
