= Claude Nobs =

Swiss businessman

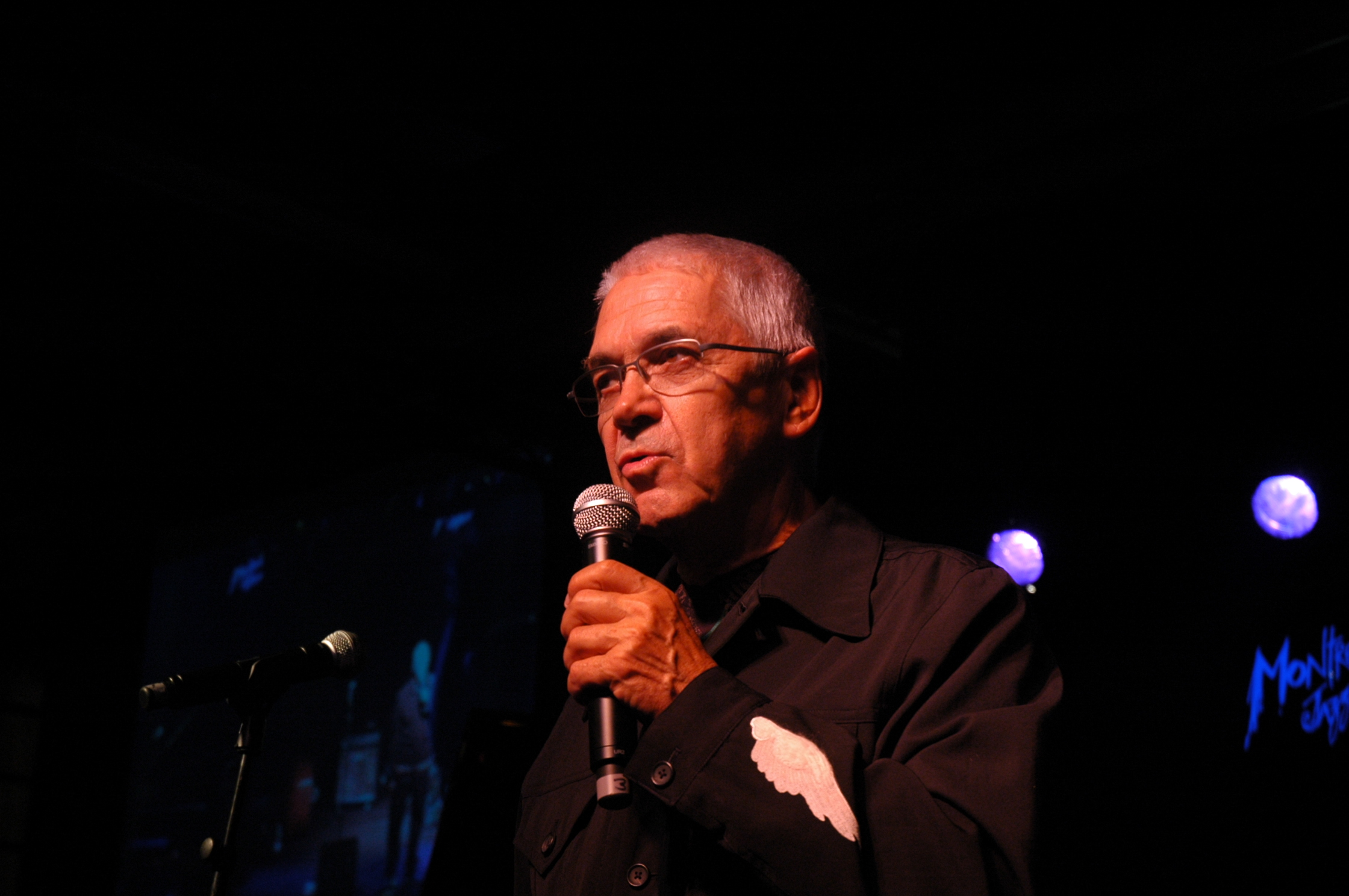
- Nobs in 2006
- Born: February 4, 1936; Territet, Montreux, Switzerland
- Died: January 10, 2013 (aged 76); Lausanne, Switzerland

Claude Nobs (February 4, 1936 – January 10, 2013) was the founder and general manager of the Montreux Jazz Festival.

== Biography ==
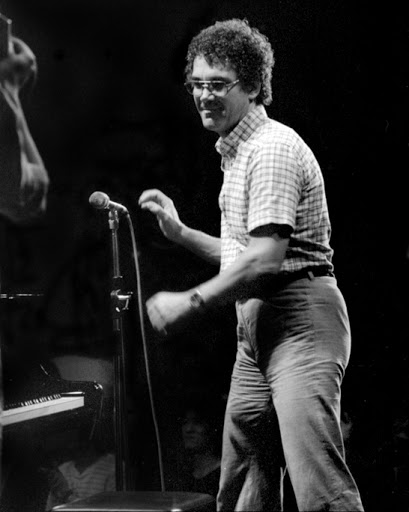
Nobs introducing the Bill Evans Trio at Montreux Jazz Festival, 1978

Nobs was born in Montreux, Switzerland. After apprenticing as a cook, Nobs worked in the Tourism Office of Montreux. He later went to New York, where he met Nesuhi Ertegün, the then-president of Atlantic Records. He also met Roberta Flack and invited her to the Rose d’Or de Montreux. Later, Aretha Franklin made her first visit to Europe thanks to him.

At the age of 31, while he was director of the Tourism Office of Montreux, he organised the first jazz festival featuring artists such as Charles Lloyd, Keith Jarrett, Ron McLure and Jack DeJohnette. This new festival was an immediate success and gained a reputation far beyond Switzerland. Nobs quickly transformed his festival into an international gathering place for lovers of jazz.

In 1971, Deep Purple decided to produce and record their album Machine Head in Montreux. The group was also scheduled to record at the Montreux Casino, shortly after Frank Zappa performed. During Zappa's concert, a member of the audience fired a flare gun towards the ceiling, resulting in a severe fire that reduced the Casino to ashes. Nobs saved several young people who had hidden in the casino, thinking they would be sheltered from the flames. Nobs, who had served as a volunteer fireman, knew that the casino was not actually a safe place and acted immediately to get them out. This earned him a mention in the song "Smoke on the Water" (the line "Funky Claude was running in and out pulling kids out the ground"). Also, on the inner liner of the original album, Nobs' picture was the only one labeled with a name other than the band members.

In 1973, Nobs became the director of the Swiss branch of Warner, Elektra and Atlantic. At the beginning of the live Jethro Tull album Bursting Out (recorded in 1978 in Bern), one can hear Nobs announcing in Swiss German with French accent, "Gueten Abig mitenand, und herzliche Willkommen in Festhalle Bern!" ("Good evening everybody, and welcome to the Festhalle of Bern"), followed by greetings in Italian, French and English.

During the 1990s, Nobs shared the directorship of the festival with Quincy Jones, and made Miles Davis an honorary host. The festival continued to diversify and was no longer exclusively devoted to jazz.

In 2004, the festival attracted 200,000 visitors. In September 2004, Nobs received the Tourism Prize of Salz & Pfeffer. The canton of Vaud gave him the "Prix du Rayonnement" for his contributions to music. He has also received an honorary doctorate.

In 2005, during the referendum campaign on registered partnership in Switzerland for same-sex couples, Nobs came out publicly to support the new law. At the time, he had been in a relationship with his partner, Thierry Amsallem, since 1987.

On 24 December 2012, Nobs had an accident while cross-country skiing in Switzerland and fell into a coma. He died on 10 January 2013 at age 76.
