= Steven Lloyd-Gonzalez =

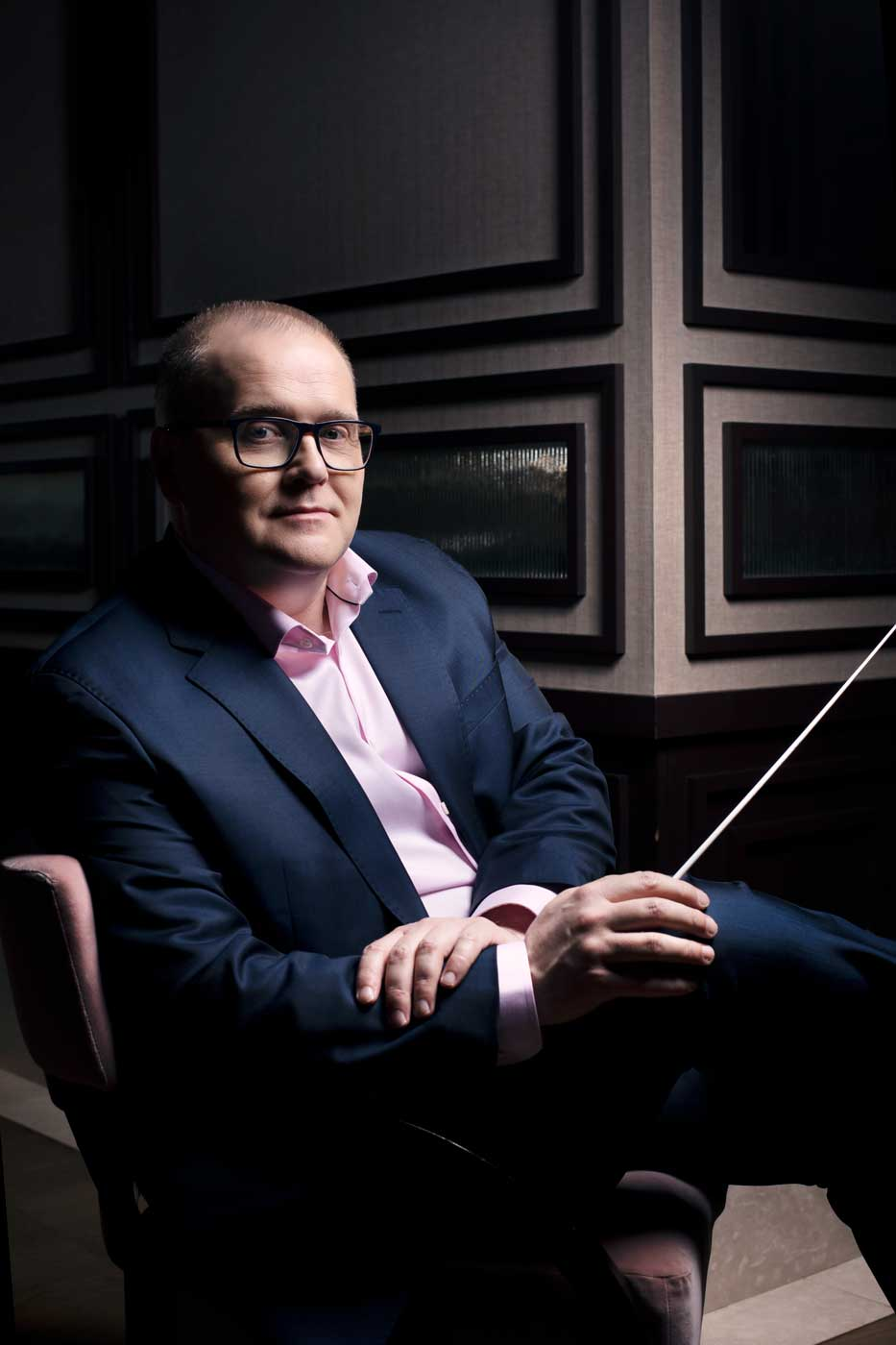
- Steven Lloyd-Gonzalez
- Born: 27 February 1971; Birmingham, UK
- Occupation: Conductor

Steven Richard Lloyd-Gonzalez (born 27 February 1971) is a British orchestral conductor.

== Early career ==
At 14 he joined the percussion section of Birmingham Schools Concert Orchestra. He went on to make his conducting debut with this orchestra at the age of 17. He continued his musical studies at Colchester Institute and the Royal Birmingham Conservatoire, where he won the Michael Beech Conducting Award, Principal's Prize, Salveson Baton and the silver medal from the Worshipful Company of Musicians.

== Career ==
In 1995 he won an audition to become the assistant conductor of Royal Birmingham Junior Conservatoire, rising to chief conductor a year later. He was also a staff conductor at the senior Conservatoire, giving the first performance of the Millennium Oratorio by Andrew Downes in 2000.

In 2001 Lloyd-Gonzalez was invited to record the game soundtracks for Richard Jacques' Headhunter at Abbey Road Studios in London and Xenosaga by Yasunori Mitsuda with the London Philharmonic Orchestra. In the same year, he conducted performances of Keith Johnson's, It's a Beautiful Night from Here to the Trembling Stars with the Scottish Ensemble in Glasgow.

In the summer of 2001, Lloyd-Gonzalez was invited to become the resident conductor of the Royal Oman Symphony Orchestra (orchestra to His Majesty Sultan Qaboos al Said). A post he remained in for the next two years.

Following on from Oman, he became the youngest ever chief conductor of Cairo Symphony Orchestra, Egypt from 2005 to 2007.

Since 2010, Lloyd-Gonzalez has been based in Germany, where he has held positions with the Neue Philharmonie Frankfurt, Sinfonie-Orchester Bad Nauheim and Capitol Symphony Orchestra Offenbach.

In 2022, his recording with the BBC National Orchestra of Wales of the 6th and 9th Symphonies of Dmitri Shostakovich was released on First Hand Records. The recording was given the Le Clef Award by Res Music France for best orchestral recording of the month. Writing in his double five-star BBC Music Magazine review, David Nice wrote, "The BBC National Orchestra of Wales has never been on finer form …", and "the sonorous directness at the start of the Sixth is up there with the best … and Lloyd-Gonzalez doesn't miss a trick or dynamic in Shostakovich's encyclopedia of moods and contrasts."

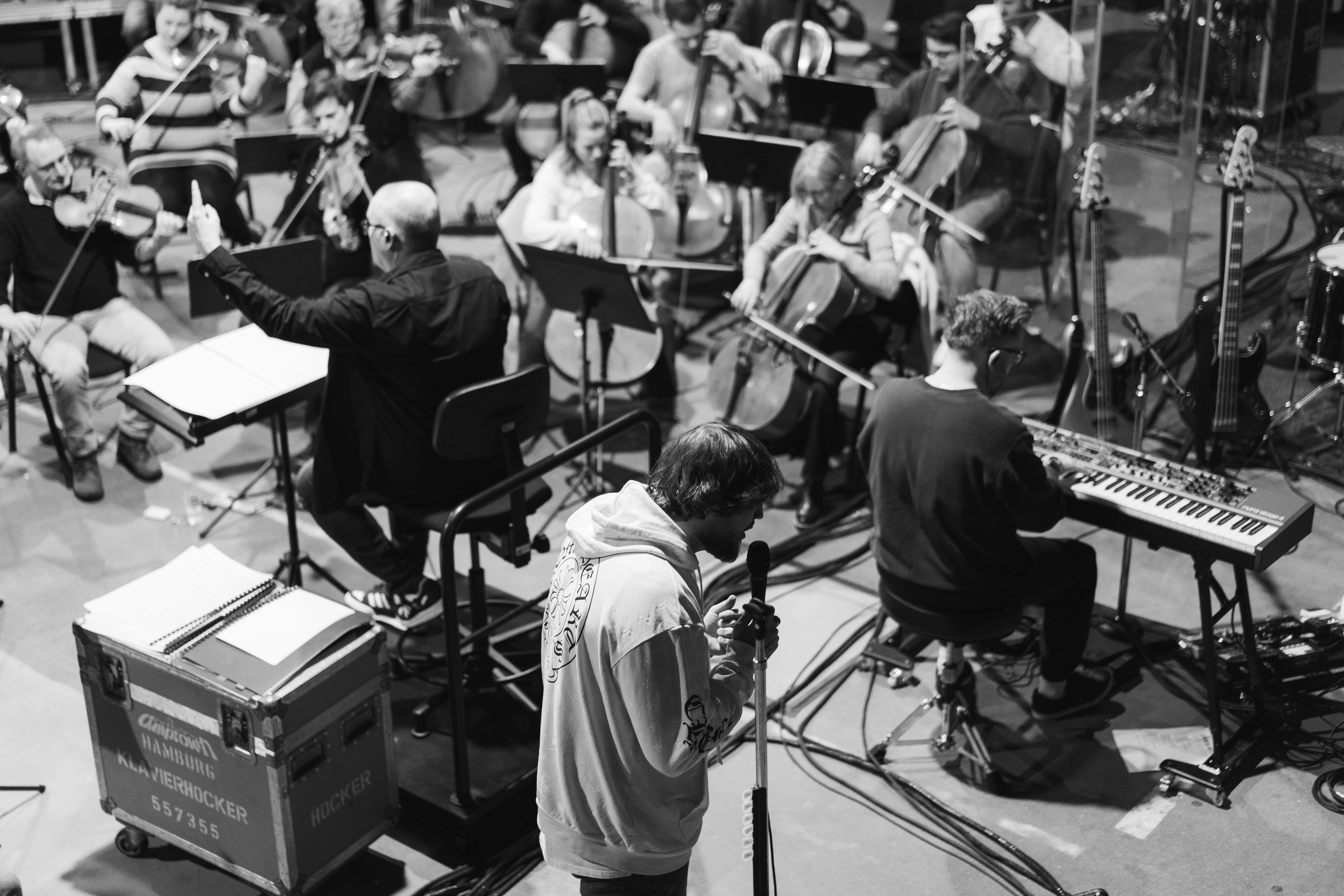
Lloyd-Gonzalez in rehearsal with James Arthur and the Lufthansa Orchestra at PM Studio, Hamburg. January 2024

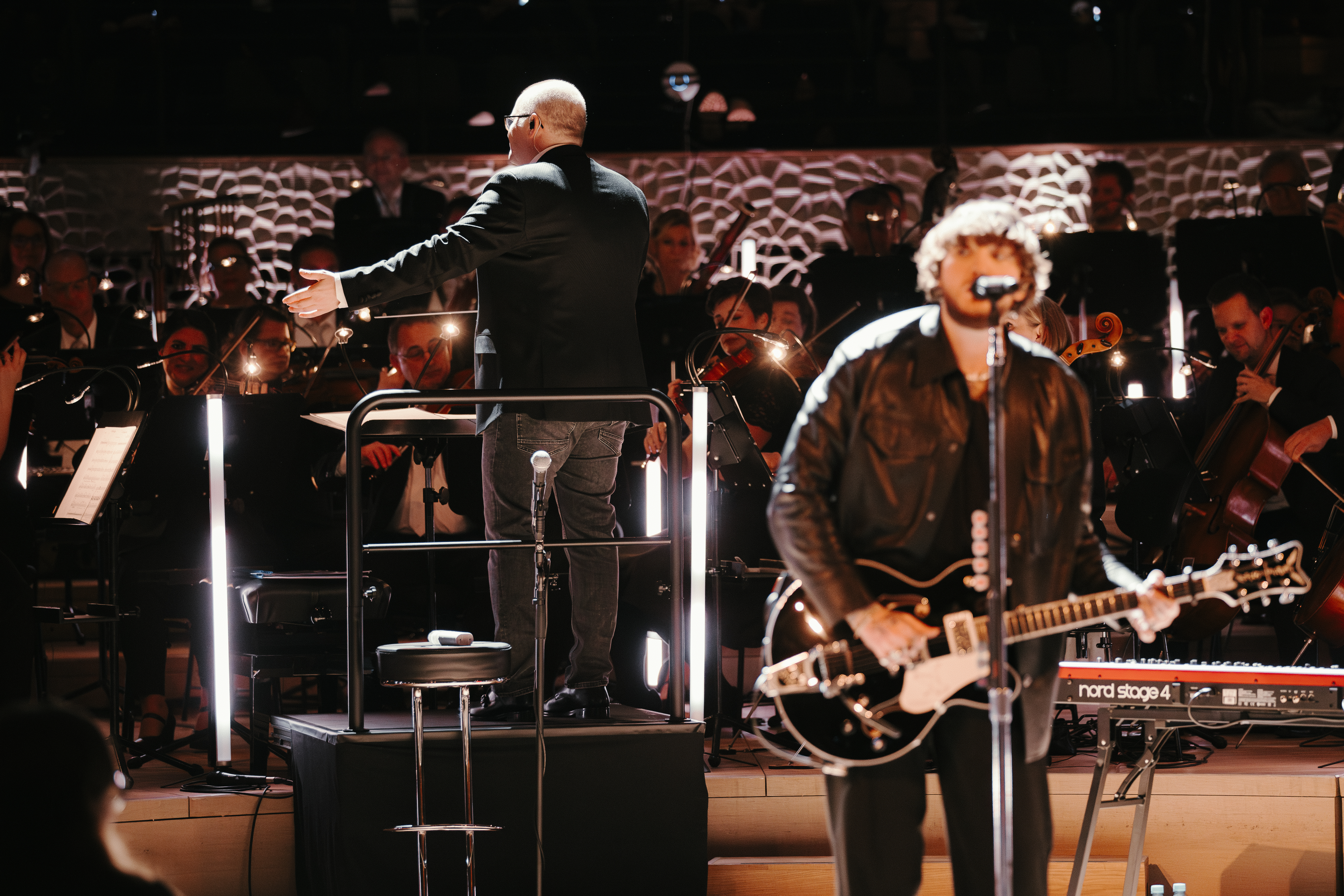
Lloyd-Gonzalez in concert with James Arthur and the Lufthansa Orchestra at the Elbphilharmonie, Hamburg. January 2024

In January 2024, Lloyd-Gonzalez performed with the British singer-songwriter James Arthur and the Lufthansa Orchestra at the Elbphilharmonie, Hamburg.

The one-off fundraising concert was organised by Fabian Narkus of the Channel Aid Charity under the auspices of the FABS Foundation.

Lloyd-Gonzalez also wrote all of the orchestrations for the concert, totalling fourteen of James Arthur’s songs; three of which Arthur included in the digital deluxe version of his Bitter Sweet Love Album, which subsequently went on to reach No.1 in the U.K. album charts.
