= Neue Philharmonie Frankfurt =

The Neue Philharmonie Frankfurt is an orchestra based in Offenbach, Germany.

The Neue Philharmonie Frankfurt, established in 1996, is beside its work as a classical symphony orchestra one of the leading crossover orchestras in Europe. The orchestra consists of many experienced crossover musicians, led by their concertmaster, the violinist Ralf Hübner.

Regular conductors are:

- Steven Lloyd-Gonzalez (United Kingdom)
- Jens Troester (Gera)
- Judith Kubitz (Cottbus)
- Wolfgang Wengenroth (Frankfurt)
- Roland Böer (Frankfurt)
- Markus Neumeyer (Frankfurt – Special: Pop/Rock/Soundtrack)

The orchestra is organized as a GbR, with the two partners:

- Dirk Eisermann (Booking & Management)
- Dr. Ralph Philipp Ziegler (Artist & Repertoire)

The orchestra is located at Capitol Theatre Offenbach (www.capitol-online.de)

The Neue Philharmonie Frankfurt has worked on various tour productions, CD, and DVD productions for example:

Deep Purple, David Garrett, Ian Anderson, Orange Blue, DJ Bobo, Sarah Brightman, Chris de Burgh, Deine Lakaien, Hartmut Engler (Pur), Giora Feidman, Bobby McFerrin, Robin Gibb, Roger Hodgson, Howard Jones, Bobby Kimball, Klaus Lage, Udo Lindenberg, Nena, Inga Rumpf, Sabrina Setlur, Joachim Witt

== See also ==
- Deep Purple: The Songs That Built Rock Tour
- David Garrett
- Live at Montreux 2011
- Ian Anderson Plays the Orchestral Jethro Tull
- Robin Gibb
