= Classic Albums =

- Country of origin: United Kingdom
- Original language: English
- No. of seasons: 12
- No. of episodes: 52

Production
- Running time: 45–50 minutes
- Production companies: Isis Productions; Eagle Rock Entertainment; NCRV; VH1

Original release
- Network: BBC; ITV; Sky Arts; VH1/VH1 Classic
- Release: 14 April 1997 – 8 October 2021

Classic Albums is a British documentary series about pop, rock and heavy metal albums that are considered the best or most distinctive of a well-known band or musician or that exemplify a stage in the history of music.

== Format ==
The TV series was made by Isis Productions and distributed by Eagle Rock Entertainment. It is shown on various broadcasters including BBC, ITV, Sky Arts, VH1 and VH1 Classic. They are also available on DVD. The show is similar in structure to VH1's short-lived 2001 series Ultimate Albums.

The music, and its production, is dissected by the musicians and/or producer playing the multitrack recordings and singling out tracks that one does not usually consciously hear when listening to the music, giving insight into the way the sound is built up. Also, the individual musicians play back pieces, which are then blended with the original recording. Almost all songs are dealt with, focusing almost entirely on the music itself, how it was composed/realised. Personal aspects of the band or members are occasionally dealt with, but mostly only if they serve this purpose.

TV episodes are 50 minutes long but the DVD releases contain much additional material. All the releases in this series are done with the co-operation and full authorisation of the artists involved. The series producers are Nick de Grunwald and Martin R Smith. Various directors have been used for the series but the majority of the programmes have been directed by Bob Smeaton, Matthew Longfellow and Jeremy Marre.

== History ==
The first hour-long series, produced independently by John Pidgeon and Roger Scott, opened with Dire Straits' Brothers in Arms in May 1989, followed by The Rolling Stones' Beggars Banquet, Genesis' Invisible Touch, Pink Floyd's The Dark Side of the Moon, The Who's Who's Next, Fleetwood Mac's Rumours, the Beach Boys' Pet Sounds, The Police's Synchronicity, Eagles' Hotel California and U2's The Joshua Tree. Scott died of cancer five months later, and the second series aired posthumously. Further programmes were presented by Richard Skinner.

The first episode of Classic Albums was actually a documentary called "The Making of Sgt. Pepper". This documentary focused on The Beatles' landmark album and was produced in much the same way as the Classic Albums series. Isis Productions and Nick de Grunwald co-produced this documentary and it helped lay the template for the Classic Albums series. It aired in 1992 both on the Disney Channel in the United States and ITV's The South Bank Show in the UK.

== Episodes ==
Most episodes focus on one particular album in a band's catalog. The three exceptions have been the Grateful Dead, Rush, and Frank Zappa, each of whom had a pair of albums featured in a single episode.

The Who and The Doors were each featured in three episodes, and Frank Zappa in two – first as a solo artist, and later as a member of The Mothers of Invention.

The albums that have been covered are:

Year	Artist – Album
1997	1. Paul Simon – Graceland (1986); 2. Grateful Dead – Anthem of the Sun (1968) and American Beauty (1970) (see Anthem to Beauty); 3. Stevie Wonder – Songs in the Key of Life (1976); 4. The Band – The Band (1969); 5. The Jimi Hendrix Experience – Electric Ladyland (1968); 6. Fleetwood Mac – Rumours (1977)
1999	1. U2 – The Joshua Tree (1987); 2. Phil Collins – Face Value (1981); 3. Meat Loaf – Bat Out of Hell (1977); 4. Bob Marley and the Wailers – Catch a Fire (1973); 5. Steely Dan – Aja (1977); 6. The Who – Who's Next (1971)
2001	1. Iron Maiden – The Number of the Beast (1982) (see Classic Albums: Iron Maiden – The Number of the Beast); 2. Elton John – Goodbye Yellow Brick Road (1973); 3. Metallica – Metallica ("The Black Album") (1991); 4. Lou Reed – Transformer (1972); 5. Elvis Presley – Elvis Presley (1956); 6. Judas Priest – British Steel (1980)
2002	1. Sex Pistols – Never Mind the Bollocks (1977); 2. Deep Purple – Machine Head (1972) (see Classic Albums: Deep Purple – The Making of Machine Head); 3. Def Leppard – Hysteria (1987)
2003	1. Pink Floyd – The Dark Side of the Moon (1973)
2005	1. Simply Red – Stars (1991); 2. Nirvana – Nevermind (see Classic Albums: Nirvana – Nevermind) (1991); 3. Motörhead – Ace of Spades (1980); 4. Queen – A Night at the Opera (1975)
2006	1. Cream – Disraeli Gears (1967)
2007	1. Frank Zappa – Apostrophe (') (1974) and Over-Nite Sensation (1973); 2. Jay Z – Reasonable Doubt (1996)
2008	1. The Doors – The Doors (1967); 2. John Lennon/The Plastic Ono Band – John Lennon/Plastic Ono Band (1970); 3. Duran Duran – Rio (1982)
2010	1. Black Sabbath – Paranoid (1970); 2. Tom Petty and the Heartbreakers – Damn the Torpedoes (1979); 3. Rush – 2112 (1976) and Moving Pictures (1981); 4. The Beach Boys – Pet Sounds (1966)
2011	1. The Doors – L.A. Woman (1971); 2. Primal Scream – Screamadelica (1991)
2012	Peter Gabriel – So (1986)
2013	The Who – Tommy (1969)
2017	1. Don McLean – American Pie (1971); 2. Carly Simon – No Secrets (1972)
2018	Amy Winehouse – Back to Black (2006)
2019	The Crickets – The "Chirping" Crickets (1957)
2020	Tears for Fears – Songs from the Big Chair (1985)
2021	1. The Who – The Who Sell Out (1967); 2. Soul II Soul - Club Classics Vol. One (1989); 3. Suede – Coming Up (1996); 4. Gil Scott-Heron - Pieces of a Man (1971); 5. The Doors - Morrison Hotel (1970); 6. The Mothers of Invention - Freak Out! (1966)

== Dutch episodes ==
In the Netherlands, special episodes were produced exploring landmark Dutch albums. There were two series produced for two different channels.

The first ran in 1997 on the channel NCRV, in between episodes from the BBC series. These were never released on DVD.

- Q65 - Revolution (1966)
- Boudewijn de Groot - Voor de overlevenden (1966)
- Cuby + Blizzards - Groeten uit Grollo (1967)
- The Outsiders - Outsiders (1967)
- Focus - Focus II (Moving Waves) (1971)
- Kayak - Royal Bed Bouncer (1975)

The second ran in 2011-2012 on the channel VPRO.

- Shocking Blue - At Home (1969) including "Venus" (1969)
- Herman Brood - Shpritsz (1978)
- De Dijk - Niemand in de Stad (1989)
- Bettie Serveert - Palomine (1992)
- Caro Emerald - Deleted Scenes from the Cutting Room Floor (2010)
