= Maybe I'm a Leo =

- Cover of the 1973 Australia single

Song by Deep Purple

from the album Machine Head
- Released: March 1972
- Recorded: 6–21 December 1971, Montreux, Switzerland
- Genre: Hard rock; blues rock
- Length: 4:52
- Label: EMI (UK); Warner Bros. (US)
- Songwriter(s): Ritchie Blackmore; Ian Gillan; Roger Glover; Jon Lord; Ian Paice
- Producer(s): Deep Purple

"Maybe I'm a Leo" is a song by the English rock group Deep Purple, from their 1972 album Machine Head.

== History ==
Roger Glover says: "I wrote the riff to "Maybe I'm a Leo" after hearing John Lennon's "How Do You Sleep?". I liked the idea that the riff didn't start on the down beat, like 99% of riffs do. Most of the songs on Machine Head were from the first take, or not long after."

Singer Ian Gillan is a Leo (born 19 August), the only group member at the time with that astrological sign.

The song was rarely played by the band live; however, three live recordings of it have been released on albums: Deep Purple in Concert, recorded in 1972; Live at the Olympia '96; and Live at Montreux 2011.

The SACD version of Machine Head has an alternative guitar solo on "Maybe I'm a Leo".

== Personnel ==
- Ritchie Blackmore – guitar
- Ian Gillan – vocals
- Roger Glover – bass guitar
- Jon Lord – organ
- Ian Paice – drums

== Cover versions ==
- The Atomic Bitchwax on their album 3.
- Gov't Mule on The Deep End, Volume 1 in which Roger Glover made a guest appearance.
- Paul Gilbert on Smoke on the Water, a Tribute to Deep Purple
- Van Halen used to perform the song during their early concerts.
- Glenn Hughes, Luis Maldonado & Chad Smith on Re-Machined: A Tribute to Deep Purple's Machine Head.
- Blindside Blues Band (2008.) on their album Keepers Of The Flame
