= Machine Head (album) =

Studio album by Deep Purple
- Released: 30 March 1972
- Recorded: 6–21 December 1971
- Studios: Grand Hotel (Montreux, Switzerland) and the Rolling Stones Mobile Studio
- Genres: Hard rock; heavy metal
- Length: 37:46
- Labels: Purple; Warner Bros. (US & Canada)
- Producer: Deep Purple

Deep Purple chronology
Fireball (1971)	Machine Head (1972)	Made in Japan (1972)

Singles from Machine Head
- 1. "Never Before" Released: March 1972; 2. "Lazy" Released: June 1972 (US); 3. "Highway Star" Released: July 1972 (Japan); 4. "Smoke on the Water" Released: May 1973

Alternative cover
- 25th anniversary CD slipcase

Machine Head is the sixth studio album by English rock band Deep Purple. It was recorded in December 1971 in Montreux, Switzerland, and released on 30 March 1972, by Purple Records. It is the band's third studio album to feature the Mark II line-up of Ritchie Blackmore, Ian Gillan, Roger Glover, Jon Lord, and Ian Paice.

Previous recording sessions had been slotted into the group's gigging schedule. This time, Deep Purple wanted to dedicate time to record an album away from the typical studio environment, hoping it would result in a sound closer to their live shows. They used the Rolling Stones Mobile Studio for recording and block-booked the Montreux Casino as a venue, but during a Frank Zappa and the Mothers of Invention concert immediately before the sessions, the casino burned to the ground after an audience member fired a flare gun into the ceiling. After a week of searching for an alternative venue, including a session at a nearby theatre that was abandoned due to noise complaints, the band managed to book the Grand Hotel, closed for the winter, and converted it into a live room suitable for recording. These events, particularly the casino fire, became the inspiration for the song "Smoke on the Water".

Machine Head became Deep Purple's most commercially successful album, topping the charts in several countries, including the UK. Influential in the development of heavy metal, it continues to be viewed favourably by music critics and has been reissued several times. It is widely considered one of the greatest and most influential rock albums of all time.

== Background ==
By 1971, Deep Purple had been touring for two years and earlier studio albums, such as Deep Purple in Rock (1970) and Fireball (1971) were recorded in between live shows. The band felt that prior studio work did not sound as good as their live performances, and wanted to record in a stage environment. Drummer Ian Paice recorded his kit in the corridor for some of the Fireball sessions, believing it sounded better, and he wanted to find an alternative recording environment away from a typical sound-proofed studio. Deep Purple were advised to record outside the United Kingdom as they would not have to pay as much income tax.

The group toured the UK from September to October 1971 and previewed some new material that was ultimately released on Machine Head, in particular "Highway Star" and "Lazy". They then began a tour of the United States, but it was cancelled two gigs in when singer Ian Gillan contracted hepatitis. Guitarist Ritchie Blackmore started to think about possible solo work for the future, teaming up with Paice and Phil Lynott for a brief period as a possible side-project, and Deep Purple as a whole looked forward to a dedicated block of time to record, getting away from the pressures of touring.

Deep Purple initially planned to record Machine Head at Montreux Casino in Switzerland in December 1971. They had booked the Rolling Stones Mobile Studio and made hotel reservations. The casino was a large arena, containing several entertainment facilities. The band had performed there in May 1971, and befriended Claude Nobs, founder and general manager of the Montreux Jazz Festival. Among others, Led Zeppelin, Pink Floyd, and Black Sabbath had all performed at the casino. It closed for refurbishments each winter, allowing it to be used as a recording venue. Deep Purple arrived there on 3 December 1971. After a final concert, they would have the location to themselves. In return, the band tentatively proposed to perform a show at the casino, which would have allowed them to release a double album, half live and half studio.

== Recording ==
We were sitting in this bar restaurant about a quarter of a mile from the casino, and it was blazing. The wind was coming down off the mountains and taking the smoke and flames across the lake.

— Ian Gillan, discussing the origin of "Smoke on the Water"

The last gig at Montreux Casino was a matinée performance by Frank Zappa and the Mothers of Invention. At the time, the group included singers Flo & Eddie, multi-instrumentalist Ian Underwood and drummer Aynsley Dunbar. During the show, a member of the audience fired a flare into the building's roof. Although the audience were initially unaware of the incident because the roof was covered by a false bamboo ceiling, about an hour into the set, people started seeing sparks emerging. The group stopped playing; according to bassist Roger Glover, Zappa said that "no-one should panic, but ..... FIRE!" After this, management ordered a controlled evacuation. There were no fatalities, but a group were briefly trapped in the casino's basement before being rescued by Nobs. Shortly after everyone had been safely evacuated, the building went up in flames.

Nobs relocated Deep Purple to the Pavilion, a nearby theatre, where they recorded the basic tracks for a song provisionally named "Title No. 1". Glover recalled waking up one morning saying the title "Smoke on the Water" out loud. From this, Gillan wrote the lyrics which describe the experience in Montreux. A photograph of the burning Montreux Casino was included in the album's gatefold cover.

We had the Rolling Stones' mobile recording unit sitting outside in the snow ... once we got to the truck for a playback, even if we didn't think it was a perfect take, we'd go, 'Yeah, that's good enough.' Because we just couldn't stand going back again.

— Ritchie Blackmore

The Pavilion proved to be impractical to record in, as nearby residents complained to the police about the noise. Although roadies tried to prevent the police entering by holding the doors shut, the band were quickly evicted. They searched for other recording locations and settled with the empty Grand Hotel, on the edge of Montreux. With the mobile unit parked at the main entrance, Deep Purple set up at the end of a corridor off the main lobby where the hallway came to a "T". An assortment of equipment and sound-insulating mattresses were installed, which meant the band had to walk through bedrooms and across balconies to get to the recording van. This proved so arduous that Deep Purple stopped listening to playbacks of their recordings, instead performing until they were satisfied. A closed-circuit television system was set up so the band could communicate with engineer Martin Birch and allow staff in the studio control room to see them.

== Songs ==
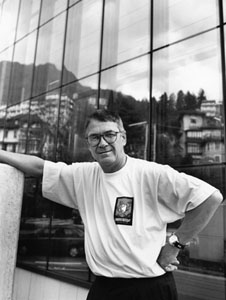
Claude Nobs managed the recording trip, and is referred to as "Funky Claude" in "Smoke on the Water".

The opening track, "Highway Star", was written while the group were on a coach travelling to their opening UK tour date in Portsmouth on 13 September 1971. The band's management arranged for them to travel to the gig with a group of music journalists who could interview the band at their leisure. One of them asked Blackmore how he wrote songs, upon which he said, "like this", picked up the guitar and played the song's opening riff. Gillan improvised a set of lyrics around: "We're on the road, we're a rock'n'roll band". The rest of the band completed the arrangement during rehearsals and it was added to the show on the evening of the gig. Blackmore based his guitar solo around a figure that he learned from Johnny Burnette, and liked its resemblance to Johann Sebastian Bach.

"Maybe I'm A Leo" went under the working title of "One Just Before Midnight", which appears in a picture of a recording sheet on the album sleeve. The finished title and lyrics refer to Gillan's birth sign. Glover wrote the song's main riff after listening to John Lennon's "How Do You Sleep?", and he liked that the riff did not start on the first beat of the bar. The song was played live once in 1972 at a BBC In Concert performance. It became a live favourite years later, after Joe Satriani temporarily joined the band in 1993.

"Pictures of Home" describes the sights and images of the local area around Montreux, far away from home. The track was initially recorded with a drum introduction, which was left off the original recording; however, it was added for the 25th anniversary reissue. The track was also played live after Satriani joined Deep Purple. "Never Before" was considered by the band to be the most commercial track on the album, and was released as a single. The song was played live once at the BBC In Concert show.

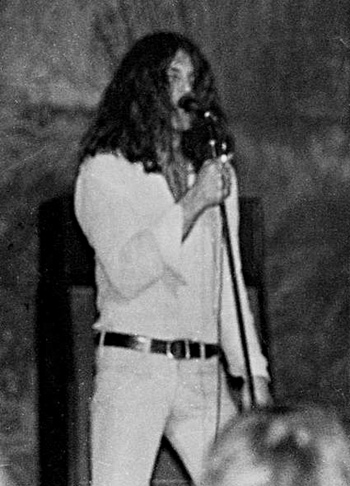
Ian Gillan, touring the US in January 1972 in support of Machine Head

"Smoke on the Water" documents the experiences of recording Machine Head, including the casino fire and evacuation, and the sessions at the Grand Hotel. The title referred to thick black smoke from the fire hanging over the shore of Lake Geneva. The backing track was the only usable material that came from the Pavilion recordings, before police shut the sessions down. Blackmore contributed the opening guitar riff, and later said it was popular due to it being simple and based around four notes, comparing it to the opening musical phrasing of Beethoven's Fifth Symphony. Although the track is the most famous by Deep Purple and rock music generally, the band did not think it had much commercial potential, and it was one of the last of the tracks from Machine Head to be played live. After finally being released as a single in the US more than a year after the album's release, the song became a major chart hit there, reaching number four on the Billboard Hot 100. As well as Deep Purple, Gillan has performed the song live as part of his solo career, and during his brief time with Black Sabbath in 1983.

"Lazy" was first played live during the 1971 UK tour, and retained throughout the following year. It was performed towards the end of the live show, replacing the instrumental workout "Wring That Neck", and was later moved mid-set in early 1972. Glover said the song was roughly based on an Oscar Brown song, "Sleepy", while Blackmore stated it was inspired by Eric Clapton's "Stepping Out". The song was designed to be a vehicle for various instrumental showcases, including an unaccompanied organ introduction and Gillan's harmonica. Blackmore recorded the guitar solos in sections on two different days, which were then joined.

"Space Truckin'" was written as a pastiche of 1950s rock 'n' roll lyrics, but with a science fiction theme. Deep Purple began thinking of nonsense phrases such as "music in our solar system" that would fit. Paice played a short drum solo on the track. It was first played live in January 1972 at the next gig following the Montreux sessions, and led into the instrumental section of the earlier live showcase "Mandrake Root" as the closing number. The song remained the last number in the set after Gillan and Glover left the band in 1973, including a memorable performance at the California Jam the following year, where Blackmore set fire to his amplifiers and destroyed a TV camera with his guitar. The song was regularly played as a wakeup call by the crew on board the Space Shuttle program flight STS-107 in 2003.

A ballad entitled "When a Blind Man Cries" was recorded during the Machine Head sessions, but was not included on the album. Instead, it was used as the B-side on the "Never Before" single. The song appears as a bonus track on the 25th anniversary edition of Machine Head.

== Release and artwork ==
The album was released in the UK on 30 March 1972. A US tour for March and April that year was postponed after Blackmore fell ill. The first shows in the UK, promoting the album were at the Rainbow Theatre in June 1972. Two months later, the band toured Japan for the first time, recordings of which become the double live album Made in Japan. Four songs from Machine Head ("Highway Star", "Smoke on the Water", "Lazy" and "Space Truckin'") were included in the album.

The album title was inspired by the adjustment knobs on Roger Glover's bass; such knobs on string instruments are known as a machine head, and the back album cover features a picture of Glover's bass headstock.

The cover art was created by stamping the album title into a polished metal sheet, which was held up to act as a mirror in front of which the group stood. The photographer Shepard Sherbell then took a picture of the reflection; a small trace of him can be made out on the finished picture (just below the "Head" text). The album's inner sleeve was mostly designed by Glover and manager Tony Edwards, and features a selection of mug shots that were previously used for record company contact sheets. It included a picture of Nobs, to whom Machine Head was dedicated. The initial pressings also had a hand-printed lyric sheet.

== Critical reception ==
Professional ratings
Review scores
Source	Rating
AllMusic	5/5 stars
BBC Music	favourable
Christgau's Record Guide	B
MusicHound	5/5 stars
Record Collector	4/5 stars
Rolling Stone	favourable
The Daily Vault	A
Uncut	5/5 stars

Machine Head reached number one in its second week on the UK Albums Chart, remaining there for two weeks before returning in May 1972 for a further week. In the US, during its initial release in 1972, the album reached number 34; the album then peaked at number 7 in 1973 when "Smoke on the Water" became a hit, and Machine Head remained on the Billboard charts for over two years. The first single released from the album, "Never Before", reached number 35 in the UK and did not chart in the US. Prompted by heavy radio play of "Smoke on the Water" as an album cut, Warner Brothers eventually released it as a single in May 1973. The song reached number two on the Canadian RPM chart and number four on the US Billboard Hot 100.

The album was met with positive reviews from critics. Rolling Stone's Lester Bangs praised the lyrics to "Highway Star" and "Space Truckin'" as well as all the music, although he was less complimentary about the lyrics of the remaining songs: "In between those two Deep Purple classics lies nothing but good, hard-socking music, although some of the lyrics may leave a bit to be desired." Concluding his review, he admitted: "I do know that this very banality is half the fun of rock 'n' roll. And I am confident that I will love the next five Deep Purple albums madly so long as they sound exactly like these last three." Robert Christgau wrote of the album: "I approve of their speeding, and Ritchie Blackmore has copped some self-discipline as well as a few suspicious-sounding licks from his buddies in London." AllMusic critic Eduardo Rivadavia called Machine Head "one of the essential hard rock albums of all time."

Blackmore noted that Machine Head was recorded in about three weeks, remarking that "everything was natural and it all worked." He further stated, "I didn't like Fireball very much because we were just working too much. But we had about a month off before Machine Head, which allowed me to get my head together and write some stuff." On the 50th anniversary of Machine Head in 2022, Ian Gillan remarked, "It was a milestone for sure because it took us two albums to get there. It took In Rock and Fireball to reach Machine Head. Machine Head is a slightly more refined version of those earthier ones. It's a historical album, and we're still doing 'Highway Star,' we still do 'Pictures of Home,' which are actually the two opening tracks in our live set right now. And of course, we still do 'Smoke on the Water,' which always goes down a treat."

Kerrang! magazine ranked Machine Head at number 35 on their "100 Greatest Heavy Metal Albums of All Time" list in 1989. In an Observer Music Monthly Greatest British Albums poll, Ozzy Osbourne chose the album as one of his 10 favourite British records of all time. Machine Head became the subject of one of the Classic Albums series of documentaries about the making of famous albums. In 2001, Machine Head was mentioned in Q's "50 Heaviest Albums of All Time", while in 2007, it featured in The Guardian's 2007 edition of 1000 Albums to Hear Before You Die. In 2024, Loudwire staff elected it as the best hard rock album of 1972.

== Reissues ==
The album was released on the multichannel formats DVD-Audio (2001), in a new 5.1 channel mix and Super Audio CD (SACD) (2003) with the European quadraphonic mix. It was later released via SACD on 17 August 2011, through Warner Music Group in the Warner Premium Sound series of the label, which has the same 5.1 channel mix as the 2001 DVD-Audio version.

The 40th anniversary edition of Machine Head was released in October 2012 by EMI; this is a five-disc set, accompanied by an illustrated 60-page hardback booklet. Its contents include: Original album 2012 remaster (CD1), Roger Glover's 1997 mixes (CD2), Original album quad SQ stereo (2012 remaster) (CD3), In Concert '72 from Paris Theatre, London, 9 March 1972 – 2012 mix (CD4), 2012 high-resolution remaster and surround mixes (DVD, audio only). To celebrate the 40th anniversary, a tribute album Re-Machined: A Tribute to Deep Purple's Machine Head was released in September 2012, through Eagle Rock Entertainment.

A new Machine Head: Super Deluxe Edition was reissued 29 March 2024 by Rhino with a new remix (including the b-side "When A Blind Man Cries") produced by Dweezil Zappa and a new remaster of the original mix by Andy Pearce on CD 1. The edition includes two live performances: the first being recorded on 9 March 1972 at Paris Theatre in London (CD2, previously available as In Concert '72), the second being recorded earlier in April 1971 at Montreux Casino in Switzerland (CD3). The new remix is also included on a vinyl LP, with "When A Blind Man Cries" inserted between "Lazy" and "Space Truckin'". Furthermore, the set contains a Blu-ray audio-only disc including Zappa's Atmos Mix, 1974 U.S. Quad (available for the first time on a digital medium), and three tracks in 5.1 surround (taken from the 2001 DVD-A).

== Track listing ==
=== Original vinyl release ===
All tracks are written by Ritchie Blackmore, Ian Gillan, Roger Glover, Jon Lord and Ian Paice.

Side one
No.	Title	Length
1.	"Highway Star"	6:05
2.	"Maybe I'm a Leo"	4:51
3.	"Pictures of Home"	5:03
4.	"Never Before"	3:56

Side two
No.	Title	Length
5.	"Smoke on the Water"	5:40
6.	"Lazy"	7:19
7.	"Space Truckin'"	4:31
Total length:		37:25

=== 25th Anniversary Edition ===
Disc one: 1997 Remixes
No.	Title	Length
1.	"Highway Star"	6:29
2.	"Maybe I'm a Leo"	5:30
3.	"Pictures of Home"	5:24
4.	"Never Before"	4:01
5.	"Smoke on the Water"	6:16
6.	"Lazy"	7:33
7.	"Space Truckin'"	4:54
8.	"When a Blind Man Cries" (B-Side)	3:31

Disc two: Remastered
No.	Title	Length
1.	"Highway Star"	6:09
2.	"Maybe I'm a Leo"	4:52
3.	"Pictures of Home"	5:06
4.	"Never Before"	4:00
5.	"Smoke on the Water"	5:42
6.	"Lazy"	7:23
7.	"Space Truckin'"	4:34
8.	"When a Blind Man Cries" (B-Side)	3:32
9.	"Maybe I'm a Leo" (Quadrophonic mix)	4:59
10.	"Lazy" (Quadrophonic mix)	6:55

=== 40th Anniversary Edition ===
Disc one: Original Album 2012 Remaster
No.	Title	Length
1.	"Highway Star"	6:08
2.	"Maybe I'm a Leo"	4:52
3.	"Pictures of Home"	5:08
4.	"Never Before"	4:00
5.	"Smoke on the Water"	5:42
6.	"Lazy"	7:24
7.	"Space Truckin'"	4:35
8.	"When a Blind Man Cries"	3:32

Disc two: Roger Glover's 1997 Remixes
No.	Title	Length
1.	"Highway Star"	6:39
2.	"Maybe I'm a Leo"	5:25
3.	"Pictures of Home"	5:21
4.	"Never Before"	3:59
5.	"Smoke on the Water"	6:18
6.	"Lazy"	7:33
7.	"Space Truckin'"	4:52
8.	"When a Blind Man Cries"	3:33

Disc three: Original Album Quad Sq Stereo
No.	Title	Length
1.	"Highway Star"	6:11
2.	"Maybe I'm a Leo"	4:55
3.	"Pictures of Home"	5:04
4.	"Never Before"	3:59
5.	"Smoke on the Water"	5:39
6.	"Lazy"	6:53
7.	"Space Truckin'"	4:34
8.	"Smoke on the Water" (US A-Side Edit)	3:50
9.	"Lazy" (Japanese B-Side)	2:30

Disc four: In Concert '72 (2012 Remix)
No.	Title	Length
1.	"Introduction"	0:16
2.	"Highway Star"	8:32
3.	"Strange Kind of Woman"	9:17
4.	"Maybe I'm a Leo"	6:17
5.	"Smoke on the Water"	7:09
6.	"Never Before"	4:34
7.	"Lazy"	10:22
8.	"Space Truckin'"	21:46
9.	"Lucille" (Albert Collins, Richard Penniman)	7:21

The later standalone CD edition of "In Concert '72" added a soundcheck recording of "Maybe I'm a Leo" (4:32).

== Personnel ==
Deep Purple

- Ritchie Blackmore – guitars
- Ian Gillan – vocals, harmonica on "Lazy"
- Roger Glover – bass guitar
- Jon Lord – Hammond organ, keyboards
- Ian Paice – drums, percussion

Production

- Martin Birch – engineering, mixing with Deep Purple
- Jeremy "Bear" Gee – assistant engineer
- Nick Watterton – technician, Rolling Stones Mobile Studio operator
- Ian Hansford, Rob Cooksey, Colin Hart – equipment technicians
- Shephard Sherbell – photography
- Roger Glover and John Coletta – cover design
- Peter Denenberg and Roger Glover – remixing (1997)
- Peter Mew – remastering at Abbey Road Studios, London (1997)

== Charts ==
=== Weekly charts ===
Chart (1972)	Peak position
Australian Albums (Kent Music Report)	1
Austrian Albums (Ö3 Austria)	4
Canada Top Albums/CDs (RPM)	1
Danish Albums (Hitlisten)	1
Dutch Albums (Album Top 100)	1
Finnish Albums (The Official Finnish Charts)	1
French Albums (SNEP)	1
German Albums (Offizielle Top 100)	1
Italian Albums (Musica e Dischi)	4
Japanese Albums (Oricon)	6
Norwegian Albums (VG-lista)	3
Spanish Albums (AFYVE)	14
Swedish Albums (Sverigetopplistan)	4
UK Albums (Official Charts)	1
US Billboard 200	7

Chart (1997)	Peak position
UK Rock & Metal Albums (Official Charts)	5

Chart (2018)	Peak position
Scottish Albums (Official Charts)	94

Chart (2024)	Peak position
Hungarian Physical Albums (MAHASZ)	26
Swiss Albums (Schweizer Hitparade)	19

=== Year-end charts ===
Chart (1972)	Position
German Albums (Offizielle Top 100)	5

== Certifications and sales ==
Region	Certification	Certified units/sales
Brazil (Pro-Música Brasil) 2024 remaster	Gold	100,000^{‡}
France (SNEP)	2× Gold	200,000^{*}
Italy (FIMI)	Gold	25,000^{*}
Japan (RIAJ) 1989 release	Gold	100,000^{^}
Sweden	—	25,000
United Kingdom (BPI)	Gold	100,000^{^}
United States (RIAA)	2× Platinum	2,000,000^{^}
^{*} Sales figures based on certification alone.^{^} Shipments figures based on certification alone.^{‡} Sales+streaming figures based on certification alone.

== Accolades ==
Publication	Country	Accolade	Year	Rank
Kerrang!	United Kingdom	"100 Greatest Heavy Metal Albums of All Time"	1989	35
Q	United Kingdom	"50 Heaviest Albums of All Time"	2001	no ranking
Mojo	United Kingdom	"The Ultimate CD Buyers Guide – Rock"	2001	66
Q	United Kingdom	"The 30 Greatest Classic Rock Albums Ever"	2004	no ranking
Kerrang!	United Kingdom	"100 Best British Rock Albums Ever"	2005	34
Classic Rock	United Kingdom	"100 Greatest British Rock Album Ever"	2006	26
The Guardian	United Kingdom	"1000 Albums to Hear Before You Die"	2007	no ranking
