= Space Truckin' =

- B-side of the Fillipino single for "Smoke on the Water"

Song by Deep Purple

from the album Machine Head
- Released: March 1972
- Recorded: 6–21 December 1971
- Studio: Montreux, Switzerland
- Genre: Hard rock; heavy metal; space rock
- Length: 4:34; 19:54 (Made in Japan version); 4:52 (The 1997 Remixes version)
- Label: EMI (UK); Warner Bros. (US)
- Songwriters: Ian Gillan; Ritchie Blackmore; Roger Glover; Jon Lord; Ian Paice
- Producer: Deep Purple

"Space Truckin'" is a song by English hard rock band Deep Purple. It was first released in 1972 as the seventh and final track on their sixth studio album, Machine Head, and later in 1973 as the B-side to the Filipino single of "Smoke on the Water". Its lyrics talk of space travel.

Guitarist Ritchie Blackmore claims in Classic Albums: Deep Purple – The Making of Machine Head that the song composition started with the half-step riffs in the refrain, which were inspired by the theme music for the Batman TV programme composed by Neal Hefti. Blackmore asked singer Ian Gillan if he could write any lyrics over the riff, and the rest of the song evolved from there.

== Live performances ==
When it was first performed live, the band appended an instrumental that was originally part of the song "Mandrake Root" from their first album but gradually evolved into a showcase for Jon Lord's Hammond organ and Ritchie Blackmore's guitar solos. This usually took the length of the overall song to over twenty minutes, and it was always performed as the last number of the main set. A good example of this arrangement can be found on the Made in Japan album, wherein Blackmore also quotes the "cello" solo of "Fools" off Fireball.

Jon Lord played his solo through a ring modulator or played some of it on an ARP synthesizer. Meanwhile, Ritchie Blackmore usually split the guitar solo into two halves, a quiet section with just drums, then a loud section with the full band. The second half was often when Blackmore would smash his guitar, play it with his feet or throw it into the air. One of the most infamous incidents where that happened was at the California Jam festival in 1974, where he dropped one guitar over the edge of the stage, smashed a second against a TV camera, then set his amplifier on fire, which then subsequently exploded.

When Deep Purple reformed in 1984, this extended arrangement was reworked, and later included snippets of other songs.

On the remastered version of their 1982 album Live in London (recorded in 1974), there is a 31-minute-long live version of the song. It consists of a lot of improvising from the band members and in one part of the song they play the main riff from "Child in Time".

== Cover versions ==
- British heavy metal band Iron Maiden contributed a cover of "Space Truckin'" for the tribute album Re-Machined: A Tribute to Deep Purple's Machine Head to celebrate the 40th anniversary of Deep Purple's 1972 release Machine Head.
- American thrash metal band Overkill did a cover of "Space Truckin'" for their 1999 cover-album, Coverkill.
- American guitarist Ace Frehley has covered "Space Truckin'" for his 2020 album Origins Vol. 2.

== In pop culture ==
- The song appeared in the film Lords of Dogtown, the documentary Warren Miller's Dynasty and the video game Guitar Hero: Van Halen.
- The 1997 remix of the song was featured in the first and last episodes of Ash vs Evil Dead.
- "Space Truckin'" played in orbit as a wake-up call for the Red Team on Flight Day 3 of the crew of STS-107; it was specially played for Mission Specialist Kalpana Chawla, who was later one of the seven crew killed in the Space Shuttle Columbia disaster. A fan of the band, she traded e-mails with group members while in space. Guitarist Steve Morse, vocalist Ian Gillan, bass guitarist Roger Glover, drummer Ian Paice and keyboardist Don Airey were recording Bananas when the disaster occurred. Chawla had taken three CDs onboard Columbia: Deep Purple's landmark 1972 album Machine Head, 1996's Purpendicular and Rainbow's 1979 album Down to Earth (Glover and Airey were members of Rainbow at the time). To honor her, Deep Purple closed Bananas with "Contact Lost".
- "Basically, this is 'Smoke on the Water', but in space," remarked Tim Wheeler of Ash. "All Deep Purple's songs seem to be about being in a gang and, true to form, this is too – but, this time, they're intergalactic travellers. The lyrics are utter nonsense, but it doesn't matter. It's just a real stomper of a song with a great riff. I like Jon Lord's organ sound. It's so distorted, it's like a guitar."

== Personnel ==
- Ian Gillan – vocals
- Ritchie Blackmore – guitar
- Roger Glover – bass guitar
- Jon Lord – keyboards
- Ian Paice – drums, percussion
