= When a Blind Man Cries =

1972 single by Deep Purple

- Cover of the 1972 German single

Single by Deep Purple
- A-side: "Never Before"
- Released: 17 March 1972
- Recorded: 6–21 December 1971; Montreux, Switzerland
- Genre: Blues rock
- Length: 3:32
- Label: EMI (U.K.); Warner Bros. (U.S.)
- Songwriters: Ritchie Blackmore; Ian Gillan; Roger Glover; Jon Lord; Ian Paice
- Producer: Deep Purple

Deep Purple singles chronology
"Strange Kind of Woman" (1971)	"Never Before" / "When a Blind Man Cries" (1972)	"Smoke on the Water" (1973)

"When a Blind Man Cries" is a song by English rock band Deep Purple, originally only available as the B-side of the single "Never Before", released in 1972. It was recorded during the Machine Head sessions in December 1971.

According to Ian Gillan, "It’s just an example, for example, if you think of the phrase 'if a blind man cries' then it's pretty sad, those who are disadvantaged tend to be less complaining than those who are able-bodied".

== Live performances ==
Because guitarist Ritchie Blackmore disliked "When a Blind Man Cries", the band never played the song live during his stay with the band, with the exception of one occasion, on 6 April 1972 in Quebec, Canada, when Blackmore was ill, and Randy California from Spirit stood in for him. Ian Gillan performed the song frequently in the early 1990s.

When Joe Satriani replaced Blackmore during The Battle Rages On... tour in November 1993, "When a Blind Man Cries" joined the setlist as early as 5 December 1993. The song has become a staple live performance ever since, and has appeared on most of the live albums the band has released with Steve Morse.

In addition, the song has also been released on the Gillan's Inn CD/DVD by Ian Gillan, featuring blind guitarist Jeff Healey.

In 2023, the song returned to their setlist with new guitarist Simon McBride.

== Personnel ==
- Ian Gillan – vocals
- Ritchie Blackmore – guitar
- Jon Lord – keyboards
- Roger Glover – bass guitar
- Ian Paice – drums

== Metallica cover ==
"When A Blind Man Cries"

Song by Metallica

from the album Re-Machined: A Tribute to Deep Purple's Machine Head
- Language: English
- Genre: Hard rock
- Length: 3:36

American thrash band Metallica covered the song for Re-Machined: A Tribute to Deep Purple's Machine Head. Metallica later released it as a track on the deluxe edition of their tenth album, Hardwired... to Self-Destruct.
