= Never Before (song) =

- Cover of the 1972 Italian single

Single by Deep Purple

from the album Machine Head
- B-side: "When a Blind Man Cries"
- Released: 17 March 1972
- Recorded: 6–21 December 1971; Montreux, Switzerland
- Genre: Hard rock; blues rock
- Length: 3:30 (Single version); 4:01 (Album version)
- Label: EMI (UK); Warner Bros. Records (US)
- Songwriter(s): Ian Gillan, Ritchie Blackmore, Roger Glover, Jon Lord, Ian Paice
- Producer(s): Deep Purple

Deep Purple singles chronology
"Fireball" (1971)	"Never Before" (1972)	"Smoke on the Water" (1973)

"Never Before" is a song by English rock band Deep Purple, which appears on their 1972 album Machine Head. It was also released as a single and reached #35 in the UK on April 1, 1972

A promo video was made for the song in 1972. The single version of the song is an edit of the album version and lasts 3:30.

== Live performances ==
"Never Before" has rarely been performed live. The only live recording of this song appears on Deep Purple in Concert, which was recorded at the time of the single release, a week or so before Machine Head was released.

Deep Purple performed "Never Before" on tour in 2004, when they played the whole Machine Head album.

== Personnel ==
- Ian Gillan – vocals
- Ritchie Blackmore – guitars
- Roger Glover – bass guitar
- Jon Lord – keyboards
- Ian Paice – drums

== Charts ==
Chart (1972)	Peak position
Australia (Kent Music Report)	80
Belgium (Ultratop 50 Wallonia)	45
Italy (Musica e dischi)	30
Switzerland (Schweizer Hitparade)	4
UK Singles (OCC)	35
West Germany (Official German Charts)	20
