= Smoke on the Water =

1973 single by Deep Purple

- 1973 German single sleeve

Single by Deep Purple

from the album Machine Head
- B-side: "Smoke on the Water" (live)
- Released: May 1973
- Recorded: December 1971
- Genre: Hard rock; heavy metal
- Length: 5:41 (album version); 3:54 (single version); 6:15 (Roger Glover remix)
- Label: Purple (EU); Warner Bros. Records (US)
- Songwriters: Ritchie Blackmore; Ian Gillan; Roger Glover; Jon Lord; Ian Paice
- Producer: Deep Purple

Deep Purple singles chronology
"Never Before" (1972)	"Smoke on the Water" (1973)	"Woman from Tokyo" (1973)

Audio sample
- file; help

Audio
- "Smoke on the Water" Video on YouTube

"Smoke on the Water" is a song by English rock band Deep Purple, released on their 1972 studio album Machine Head. The song's lyrics are based on true events, chronicling the 1971 fire at Montreux Casino in Montreux, Switzerland. It is considered the band's signature song and its guitar riff is considered to be one of the most iconic in rock history.

In 2004, Rolling Stone magazine placed "Smoke on the Water" number 434 on its list of the "500 Greatest Songs of All Time". Total Guitar magazine ranked the song's riff number 4 on its "Greatest Guitar Riffs Ever" list, and in March 2005, Q magazine placed it at number 12 in its list of the 100 greatest guitar tracks.

In 2017, the song was inducted into the Grammy Hall of Fame.

== Composition ==
"Smoke on the Water" is easily identified by its central theme, developed by guitarist Ritchie Blackmore. It is a four-note blues scale melody in G minor, harmonised in parallel fourths. The riff, played on a Fender Stratocaster electric guitar by Blackmore, is later joined by hi-hat and distorted organ, then the rest of the drums, then electric bass parts before the start of Ian Gillan's vocal.

Blackmore later claimed that the main riff is an interpretation of the inversion of the main theme of Symphony No. 5 by Ludwig van Beethoven, and that "I owe him a lot of money".

Jon Lord doubles the guitar part on a Hammond C3 organ played through a distorted Marshall amp, creating a tone very similar to that of the guitar. Blackmore usually plays the main riff using a finger pluck.

== History ==
On the eve of the recording session, a concert with Frank Zappa and the Mothers of Invention was held in the Montreux casino's theatre. This was the theatre's final concert before the casino complex closed down for its annual winter renovations, which would allow Deep Purple to record there. "In the last few minutes of a 90 minute show", at the beginning of Don Preston's synthesiser solo on "King Kong", the place suddenly caught fire when somebody in the audience fired a flare gun towards the rattan-covered ceiling, as mentioned in the "some stupid with a flare gun" line. Although there were no major injuries, the resulting fire destroyed the entire casino complex, along with all the Mothers' equipment. The "smoke on the water" that became the title of the song (credited to bassist Roger Glover, who related how the title occurred to him when he woke from a dream a few days later) referred to the smoke from the fire spreading over Lake Geneva from the burning casino as the members of Deep Purple watched from their hotel. Glover said that, "It was probably the biggest fire I'd ever seen up to that point and probably ever seen in my life. It was a huge building. I remember there was very little panic getting out, because it didn't seem like much of a fire at first. But, when it caught, it went up like a fireworks display." The "Funky Claude" running in and out is referring to Claude Nobs, the director of the Montreux Jazz Festival who helped some of the audience escape the fire. Swiss police named Zdeněk Špička, a Czechoslovak refugee living in Épalinges, as a suspect in the case, but he fled Switzerland shortly after.

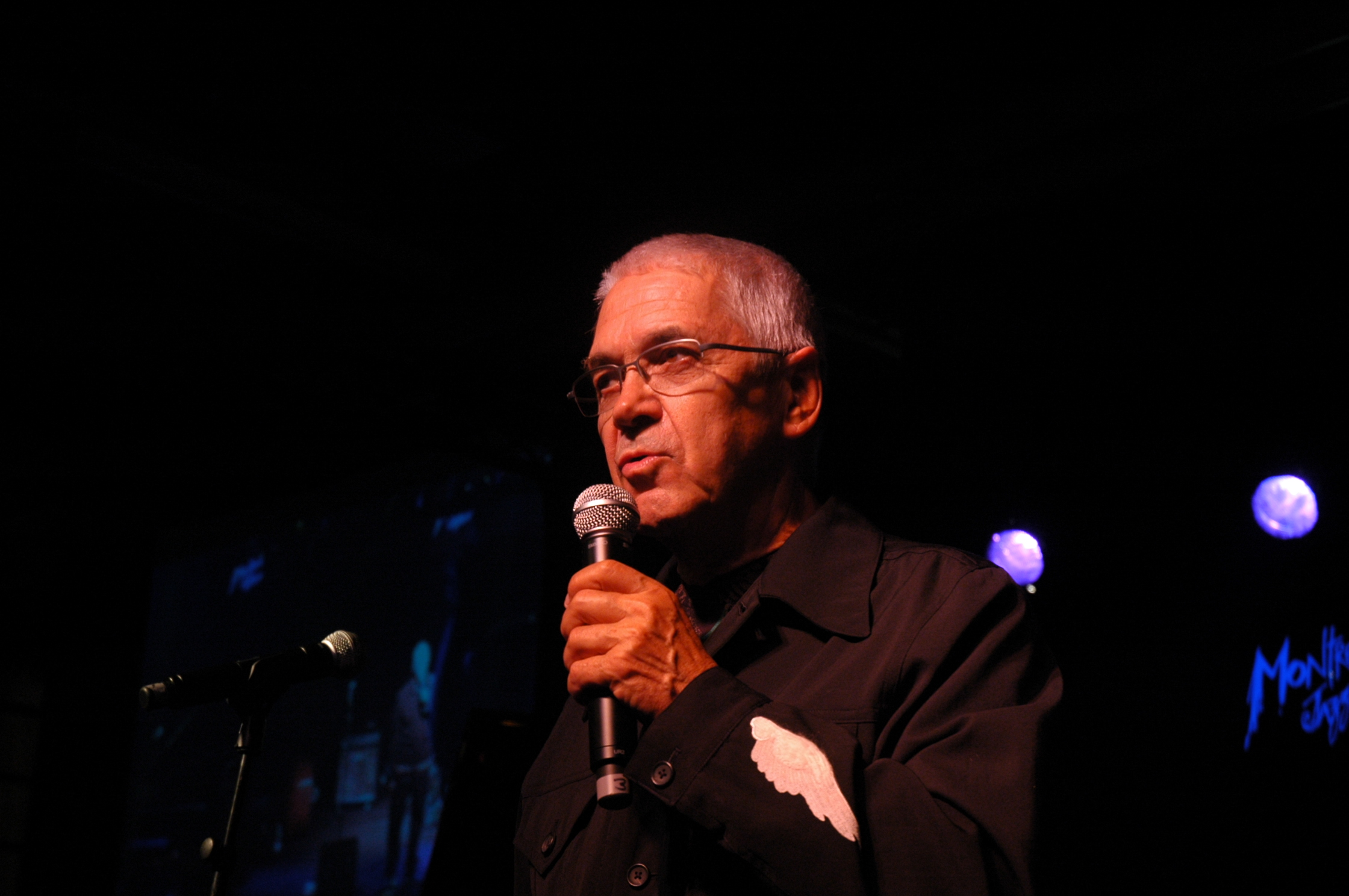
Claude Nobs (2006), the "Funky Claude" mentioned in the song

Left with the expensive Rolling Stones Mobile Studio and no place to record, the band was forced to scout the town for another place to set up. One promising venue (found by Nobs) was a local theatre, the Pavilion, but soon after the band loaded in and started working/recording, neighbours took offence at the noise. The band was only able to lay down backing tracks for one song (based on Blackmore's riff and temporarily named "Title No.1"), before local police shut them down.

After about a week of searching, the band rented the nearly-empty Grand Hôtel de Territet and converted its hallways and stairwells into a makeshift studio, where they laid down most of the tracks for what would become their most commercially successful album, Machine Head (which is dedicated to Claude Nobs).

The only song from Machine Head not recorded entirely in the Grand Hotel was "Smoke on the Water" itself, which had been partly recorded during the abortive Pavilion session. Its lyrics were composed later, primarily by Gillan and based around Glover's title, and the vocals were recorded in the Grand Hotel.

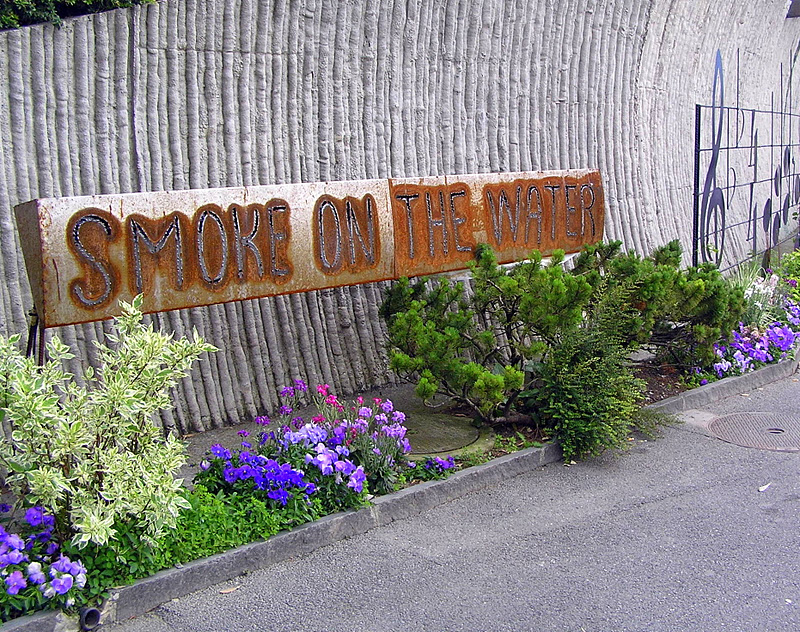
Part of the now removed sculpture on the concrete wall next to the statue of Freddie Mercury

Because of the incident and the exposure Montreux received when "Smoke on the Water" became an international hit, Deep Purple formed a lasting bond with the town. The song was honoured in Montreux by a sculpture along the lake shore (right next to the statue of Queen frontman Freddie Mercury on the concrete wall right below the marché couvert de Montreux) with the band's name, the song title, and the riff in musical notes. However, this monument has been removed and has not been there since at least 2017. The new casino in Montreux displays notes from the riff as decoration on its balustrade facing the gambling hall. The only other memorial in Montreux dedicated to the band's song is a small plaque placed outside the back entrance of the former Grand Hôtel de Territet, the building in whose hallways the album Machine Head was partially recorded.

The "Smoke on the Water" riff

On the Classic Albums episode about Machine Head, Blackmore claimed that friends of the band were not fans of the "Smoke on the Water" riff, which they thought too simplistic. Blackmore retorted by making comparisons to the first movement of Beethoven's 5th Symphony, which revolves around a similar four-note arrangement.

"The amazing thing with that song, and Ritchie's riff in particular," observed Ian Paice, "is that somebody hadn't done it before, because it's so gloriously simple and wonderfully satisfying."

The intro riff has been described as very similar to the intro of the bossa nova song "Maria Moita" composed by Carlos Lyra and Vinicius de Moraes in 1964, appearing in Lyra's album Pobre Menina Rica, and also recorded the same year by Nara Leão for her first album, Nara.

On 3 March 2024, to celebrate the Super Deluxe Edition of Machine Head, Deep Purple released its first official music video to "Smoke on the Water" after 52 years. The song was remixed by Dweezil Zappa, son of musician Frank Zappa, and the animated music video was directed by Dan Gibling and Luke McDonnell of Chiba Film.

== Impact ==
"Smoke on the Water" was included on Machine Head, which was released in early 1972, but was not released as a single until a year later, in May 1973. ("Never Before" and "Highway Star" were the first singles issued from the album.) The band members have said that they did not expect the song to be a hit, but the single reached number 4 on the Billboard pop singles chart in the United States during the summer of 1973, reached number 2 on the Canadian RPM charts, and propelled the album to the top 10 more than a year after its release. Live performances of the tune, featuring extended interplay between Blackmore's guitar and Jon Lord's Hammond organ, would become a centrepiece of Deep Purple's concerts, as in the live version found on the album Made in Japan. Warner Brothers included the live version of "Smoke on the Water" from Made in Japan as the B-side of the "Smoke on the Water" studio single.

Record World called it a "heavy thumper that never gives up."

The principal songwriters included the song within their subsequent solo ventures after Deep Purple had split up. Ian Gillan in particular performed a jazz-influenced version in early solo concerts. The band Gillan adopted a feedback-soaked approach, courtesy of Gillan guitarist Bernie Torme. The song was also featured live by Ritchie Blackmore's post-Deep Purple band Rainbow during their tours 1981–83, and again after Rainbow were resurrected briefly in the mid-1990s and for three European concerts in June 2016.

During Ian Gillan's stint with Black Sabbath in 1983, they performed "Smoke on the Water" as a regular repertoire number on encores during their only tour together.

== Accolades ==
"Smoke on the Water" has received the following rankings:

- 426 on Rolling Stone magazine's The 500 Greatest Songs of All Time (2004)
- 37 in VH1's 40 Greatest Metal Songs (2006)
- 12 in Q magazine's 100 Greatest Guitar Tracks (2005)
- 11 in VH1's "100 Greatest Hard Rock Songs" (2009)
- 4 in Total Guitar magazine's "Top 20 Greatest Guitar Riffs Ever" (2004)

== Personnel ==
- Ritchie Blackmore – guitars
- Ian Gillan – lead and backing vocals
- Roger Glover – bass guitar
- Jon Lord – Hammond organ
- Ian Paice – drums

== Chart history ==
=== Weekly charts ===
Chart (1973)	Peak position
Australia (Kent Music Report)	54
Austria (Ö3 Austria Top 40)	11
Belgium (Ultratop 50 Flanders)	27
Belgium (Ultratop 50 Wallonia)	33
Canada Top Singles (RPM)	2
Germany (GfK)	20
Netherlands (Single Top 100)	11
France (SNEP)	64
South African Chart	7
US Billboard Hot 100	4
US Cash Box Top 100	3

Chart (1977)	Peak position
UK Singles (Official Charts)	21

Chart (2012)	Peak position
France (SNEP)	134

=== Year-end charts ===
Chart (1973)	Rank
Canada	34
US Billboard Hot 100	50
US Cash Box	52

== Certifications ==
Region	Certification	Certified units/sales
Brazil (Pro-Música Brasil)	Gold	30,000^{‡}
Italy (FIMI)	Platinum	100,000^{‡}
New Zealand (RMNZ)	2× Platinum	60,000^{‡}
Spain (Promusicae)	Gold	30,000^{‡}
United Kingdom (BPI) Sales since 2005	Platinum	600,000^{‡}
United States (RIAA)	Gold	1,000,000^{^}
^{^} Shipments figures based on certification alone.^{‡} Sales+streaming figures based on certification alone.

== Rock Aid Armenia version ==
"Smoke on the Water"
- Cover for the "Rock Aid Armenia" charity release

Single by Rock Aid Armenia
- Released: 1989
- Recorded: 8–15 July 1989, Metropolis Studios in Chiswick, London.
- Songwriters: Ritchie Blackmore; Ian Gillan; Roger Glover; Jon Lord; Ian Paice
- Producers: Gary Langan; Geoff Downes

Music video
- "Smoke on the Water" (Rock Aid Armenia) on YouTube

1990 reissue cover
- Cover of the 7" reissue of the Rock Aid Armenia single

Rock Aid Armenia, a charity project to help victims of the 1988 Armenian earthquake made a charity re-recording of Deep Purple's "Smoke on the Water", with different vocalists singing various verses. The single made it to Number 39 on the UK Top 40 Singles Chart.

The rock musicians involved in the recording included Bryan Adams, Ritchie Blackmore, Bruce Dickinson, Geoff Downes, Keith Emerson, Ian Gillan, David Gilmour, Tony Iommi, Alex Lifeson, Brian May, Paul Rodgers, Chris Squire and Roger Taylor. The track's producers were Gary Langan and Geoff Downes.

== In world records ==
In 1994, in Vancouver, British Columbia, Canada, 1,322 guitarists gathered to play the world-famous riff all at the same time for a place in the Guinness Book of World Records. On Sunday 3 June 2007, in Kansas City this record was topped with 1,721 guitarists, and again just 20 days later, in the German city of Leinfelden-Echterdingen by the group 'Party Blues in Bb' with over 1,800 other people involved. The record was again topped on 1 May 2009, in Wrocław, Poland, when 6,346 guitar players, joined by then-current Deep Purple guitarist Steve Morse, performed the song during the Thanks Jimi Festival.

== See also ==
- Blues rock
- Swiss Cheese/Fire!, a recording of the concert in which the Montreux Casino fire occurred (included in Frank Zappa's Beat the Boots! II compilation)
- The Ballroom Blitz, by a contemporary British band, describing how the audience interrupted their performance.
