= Highway Star (song) =

- 1972 Japanese single sleeve

Single by Deep Purple

from the album Machine Head
- B-side: "Highway Star (long version)"
- Released: July 1972 (Japan); September 1972 (US)
- Recorded: 6–21 December 1971; Montreux, Switzerland
- Genre: Hard rock; heavy metal
- Length: 6:09 (album version); 2:58 (single version); 6:39 (The 1997 Remixes version)
- Label: Warner Bros.
- Songwriters: Ritchie Blackmore; Ian Gillan; Roger Glover; Jon Lord; Ian Paice
- Producer: Deep Purple

Official vinyl video
- "Highway Star" on YouTube

"Highway Star" is a song by the English rock band Deep Purple. It is the opening track on the band's sixth studio album Machine Head (1972) and is the fastest tempo song on the album. It is characterised by long, classically inspired guitar and organ solos.

== History ==
This song was born on a tour bus going to Portsmouth in 1971 when a reporter asked the band how they wrote songs. To demonstrate, guitarist Ritchie Blackmore grabbed an acoustic guitar and began playing a riff consisting of a single "G" repeated over and over, while vocalist Ian Gillan improvised lyrics over the top. The song was refined and was performed that same night. The song first appeared on the 1972 LP Machine Head and remained one of the band's live concert staples, being the set opener even before it was released on any album.

Record World said of the U.S. single release, "This mover has a Led Zeppelin tint to it, and that could bring the group back to the top of the pops."

The first live version released, recorded live for German TV program Beat-Club in September 1971, is featured on the History, Hits & Highlights '68–'76 DVD. It is the opening track on the live albums Nobody's Perfect (1988), Come Hell or High Water (1994), and From the Setting Sun… (In Wacken) (2015). The most famous live version is featured on the 1972 live album Made in Japan. The Guardian said, "Blackmore’s playing is like a force of nature on the Made in Japan version; those slashing chords in the intro, and that amazing solo featuring the distinctive neo-classical descending runs, combining the spirits of Bach and Jimi Hendrix."

== Structure ==
The structure of the song consists of a 35-second bass/guitar introduction, before the band launches into the thumping opening riff, which soon leads into the first vocals section (0:55). The first two verses are sung, then Jon Lord begins his Hammond organ solo (2:14). This part consists mostly of fast, arpeggiated notes with a late Baroque/early Classical influenced feel and makes use of the harmonic minor scale. The organ solo lasts for about a minute, then Ian Gillan sings the third verse of the song (3:24). At the conclusion of the third verse, the guitar solo starts (4:04), and lasts for just under a minute and twenty seconds. Blackmore wanted a very Bach-like sound and worked out the solo note by note over the chord progression Dm, Gm, C, A which itself was borrowed from Bach. Then, the fourth and final verse, which in the original recording is simply a repetition of the first verse, is sung, finishing around 6:10. Depending on the version, there may be a 15-second-long exit section before the end of the song. When the song is played live, Gillan has been known to improvise its lyrics, as seen in the official video for the song.

In 2015, readers of Guitar World voted the guitar solo number 15 in their list of the "100 Greatest Guitar Solos".

== Personnel ==
=== Deep Purple ===
- Ian Gillan – vocals
- Ritchie Blackmore – guitars
- Roger Glover – bass guitar
- Jon Lord – Hammond organ
- Ian Paice – drums

=== Production ===
- Martin Birch – engineer, mixing
- Jeremy "Bear" Gee – assistant engineer
- Nick Watterton – technician, Rolling Stones Mobile Studio operator

== Cover versions ==
The song was covered by the Gwar side project X-Cops on their 1995 album You Have the Right to Remain Silent....

In 2012, a tribute album featuring cover songs from Deep Purple's Machine Head was released, titled Re-Machined: A Tribute to Deep Purple's Machine Head. On this album, a live recording of "Highway Star" was performed by rock supergroup Chickenfoot, as well as a version recorded by Glenn Hughes, Steve Vai, and Chad Smith.

In 2018, a cover by Cory Todd was used in the science fiction television series The Expanse, in the episode "Delta-V" of season 3. The lyrics of the song were rewritten in a mix of English and Belter Creole, a constructed language made for the TV series by Nick Farmer, that was used in the show by Belters, the inhabitants of the asteroid belt and outer planets. The lyrics were additionally adjusted to fit the in-universe setting, with the references to the car in the song being replaced with the spaceship. The full version of the song was later placed on The Collector's Edition version of the TV series soundtrack that was released on 13 December 2019.

Other bands to record the song include Dream Theater, Point Blank, Stryper, Metal Church, Buckcherry, Type O Negative, and Faith No More. Buckcherry's cover was used as the theme music for TNT's coverage of NASCAR in 2009.
