= Knocking at Your Back Door: The Best of Deep Purple in the 80's =

Compilation album by Deep Purple
- Released: April 1992
- Recorded: 1984–1986–1987–1988
- Genres: Hard rock, heavy metal
- Length: 64:49
- Label: Mercury/PolyGram
- Producer: Deep Purple

Deep Purple compilations chronology
The Anthology (1985)	Knocking at Your Back Door: The Best of Deep Purple in the 80's (1992)	Smoke on the Water: The Best Of (1994)

Professional ratings
Review scores
Source	Rating
AllMusic	2/5 stars

Knocking at Your Back Door: The Best of Deep Purple in the 80's is a compilation album by the English hard rock band Deep Purple. The album was released in 1992.

It is a compilation of tracks from three albums, Perfect Strangers (1984), The House of Blue Light (1987), and the live album Nobody's Perfect (1988).

== Track listing ==
All songs written by Ian Gillan, Ritchie Blackmore, Roger Glover, Jon Lord and Ian Paice, except where noted. "Son of Alerik" is replaced by a live version of "Child in Time" on the PolyGram US edition.

1. "Knocking at Your Back Door" – 7:02
2. "Bad Attitude" (Gillan, Blackmore, Glover, Lord) – 5:07
3. "Son of Alerik" – 10:02
4. "Nobody's Home" – 4:00
5. "Black Night" (Live) – 6:07
6. "Perfect Strangers" – 5:19
7. "The Unwritten Law" (Gillan, Blackmore, Glover, Paice) – 4:55
8. "Call of the Wild" (Gillan, Blackmore, Glover, Lord) – 4:51
9. "Hush" (Live) (Joe South) – 3:31
10. "Smoke on the Water" (Live) – 7:43
11. "Space Truckin'" (Live) – 5:39

== Personnel ==
- Ian Gillan – vocals
- Ritchie Blackmore – guitars
- Jon Lord – organ, keyboards
- Roger Glover – bass, synthesizer
- Ian Paice – drums
