= Nobody's Perfect (Deep Purple album) =

- Cover design by Hipgnosis

Live album by Deep Purple
- Released: 20 June 1988 (UK); 28 June 1988 (US)
- Recorded: 23 May 1987 – 26 February 1988
- Genres: Hard rock, heavy metal
- Length: 88:53
- Label: Polydor
- Producers: Roger Glover & Deep Purple

Deep Purple live albums chronology
Live in London (1982)	Nobody's Perfect (1988)	Scandinavian Nights (1988)

Singles from Nobody's Perfect
- 1. "Hush" Released: 31 May 1988

Professional ratings
Review scores
Source	Rating
AllMusic	2/5 stars
Collector's Guide to Heavy Metal	5/10

Nobody's Perfect is a live album released in June 1988 by the English rock band Deep Purple. It was recorded during the band's tour in support of The House of Blue Light in 1987 in Europe and the United States. The outer sleeve photography was by Aubrey Powell of Hipgnosis with graphics by Richard Evans.

Track transitions are marked by fades. It also contains a new live in studio version of "Hush" to commemorate their 20th anniversary. "Black Night" was also re-recorded but never released. "Hard Lovin' Woman" includes parts of "Under the Gun" during Blackmore's guitar solo. "Strange Kind of Woman" includes the "Superstar" chorus from Jesus Christ Superstar. "Woman from Tokyo" changes into "Everyday" by Buddy Holly halfway through. The album represented Deep Purple's setlist at the time, which consisted much of the typical Made in Japan set, combined with newer material from the 1984 reunion album Perfect Strangers and its 1987 follow-up The House of Blue Light. Songs such as "The Unwritten Law" and "Difficult to Cure" (which included an extended-riff from Beethoven's Ninth Symphony, 4th Movement) were played every night on the tour, but were not included on this album. On some nights they also played "Call of the Wild" or "Mad Dog".

== Track listing ==
Some of the tracks are not necessarily included in every existing edition of the album. The original 1988 2LP release has 13 tracks, omitting "Dead or Alive". The 1988 cassette version includes "Dead or Alive", but omits "Bad Attitude". The first 1-disc CD edition from 1988 consists of just 11 tracks, leaving out both of these and also "Space Truckin'". Finally, all the indicated tracks were included on the 1999 2CD remaster.

All tracks are written by Ritchie Blackmore, Ian Gillan, Roger Glover, Jon Lord and Ian Paice, except where noted.

Disc one
No.	Title	Recorded at	Length
1.	"Highway Star"	Irvine Meadows, California on 23 May 1987	6:10
2.	"Strange Kind of Woman"	Irvine Meadows, California on 23 May 1987	7:34
3.	"Dead or Alive" (Blackmore, Gillan, Glover)	Milan, Italy on 1st September 1987	7:05
4.	"Perfect Strangers" (Blackmore, Gillan, Glover)	Irvine Meadows, California on 23 May 1987	6:25
5.	"Hard Lovin' Woman" (Blackmore, Gillan, Glover)	Oslo, Norway on 22 August 1987	5:03
6.	"Bad Attitude" (Blackmore, Gillan, Glover, Lord)	Phoenix, Arizona on 30 May 1987	5:30
7.	"Knocking at Your Back Door" (Blackmore, Gillan, Glover)	Phoenix, Arizona on 30 May 1987	11:24

Disc two
No.	Title	Recorded at	Length
1.	"Child in Time"	Phoenix, Arizona on 30 May 1987 and Oslo, Norway on 22 August 1987	10:36
2.	"Lazy"	Phoenix, Arizona on 30 May 1987	5:10
3.	"Space Truckin'"	Oslo, Norway on 22 August 1987	6:03
4.	"Black Night"	Verona, Italy on 6 September 1987 and Oslo, Norway on 22 August 1987	6:06
5.	"Woman from Tokyo"	Irvine Meadows, California on 23 May 1987	4:00
6.	"Smoke on the Water"	Oslo, Norway on 22 August 1987	7:46
7.	"Hush" (Joe South)	Live Jam at Hook End Manor on 26 February 1988	3:32

== Personnel ==
Deep Purple

- Ritchie Blackmore – guitars
- Ian Gillan – vocals, congas, harmonica
- Jon Lord – organ, synthesizer, electric piano
- Roger Glover – bass
- Ian Paice – drums

Production

- Produced by Roger Glover and Deep Purple
- Mixed at Outside Studios, Hook End Manor, England 11 February – 16 March 1988
- Engineered by Nick Davis
- Assistant engineer: Simon Metcalfe

== Charts ==
Album

Chart (1988)	Peak position
Austrian Albums (Ö3 Austria)	16
Dutch Albums (Album Top 100)	44
Finland (The Official Finnish Charts)	5
German Albums (Offizielle Top 100)	13
Japanese Albums (Oricon)	25
Norwegian Albums (VG-lista)	5
Swedish Albums (Sverigetopplistan)	5
Swiss Albums (Schweizer Hitparade)	16
UK Albums (Official Charts)	38
US Billboard 200	105

Singles

Year	Title	Chart	Position
1988	"Hush"	UK Singles Chart	62
