= Live in Europe 1993 =

Live album by Deep Purple
- Released: 21 February 2006
- Recorded: 16 October 1993; 9 November 1993
- Venues: Schleyerhalle (Stuttgart); National Exhibition Centre (Birmingham)
- Genres: Hard rock, heavy metal
- Length: 3:55:29 (128:33 in Stuttgart / 107:29 in Birmingham)
- Label: Sony BMG

Deep Purple live albums chronology
Perks and Tit (2004)	Live in Europe 1993 (2006)	Live at Montreux 1996 (2006)

Live in Europe 1993 (alternative title: On Tour MCMXCIII) is a live box-set, released by Sony/BMG, containing two concerts recorded by Deep Purple in 1993. Each concert has its own gatefold sleeve and paper CD-liners, being housed in a cardboard outer box.

The first recording is from a show on 16 October at the Schleyerhalle in Stuttgart, Germany. The second is from a show at the National Exhibition Centre in Birmingham, England on 9 November, which would be the final show Ritchie Blackmore did with Deep Purple in England.

The live album Come Hell or High Water from 1994 was recorded at this Stuttgart show. The Birmingham show was released on DVD as Come Hell or High Water in 1994.

In 2007 each show had a separate release, in a jewel-case, being titled Live in Stuttgart and Live at the Birmingham NEC. The Birmingham show was soon deleted, Ian Gillan advising fans not to buy the release, describing the performance as one of the band's worst.

== Track listings ==
All songs written by Ritchie Blackmore, Ian Gillan, Roger Glover, Jon Lord and Ian Paice, except where indicated.

=== Live at Schleyerhalle (Stuttgart) ===
==== Disc one ====
1. "Highway Star" – 7:20
2. "Black Night" – 6:15
3. "Talk About Love" – 4:22
4. "A Twist in the Tale" (Blackmore, Gillan, Glover) – 4:37
5. "Perfect Strangers" (Blackmore, Gillan, Glover) – 6:56
6. "The Mule" – 2:19
7. "Difficult to Cure (Beethoven's Ninth) / Keyboard Solo" (Ludwig van Beethoven) – 8:08
8. "Knocking at Your Back Door" (Gillan, Blackmore, Glover) – 9:40
9. "Anyone's Daughter" – 4:16
10. "Child in Time" – 11:09
11. "Anya" (Blackmore, Gillan, Glover, Lord) – 12:14

==== Disc two ====
12. "The Battle Rages On" – 6:37
13. "Lazy" – 8:55
14. "In the Hall of the Mountain King" (Edvard Grieg) – 1:54
15. "Space Truckin'" – 2:26
16. "Woman from Tokyo" – 2:08
17. "Paint It Black / Mandrake Root" (Mick Jagger, Keith Richards) – 5:35
18. "Speed King / Burn" – 7:24
19. "Hush" (Joe South) – 3:32
20. "Smoke on the Water" – 12:28

=== Live at the NEC (Birmingham) ===
==== Disc one ====
1. "Highway Star" – 8:12
2. "Black Night" – 5:19
3. "Talk About Love" – 4:16
4. "A Twist in the Tale" (Blackmore, Gillan, Glover) – 4:37
5. "Perfect Strangers" (Blackmore, Gillan, Glover) – 6:48
6. "Difficult to Cure (Beethoven's Ninth)" (Ludwig van Beethoven) – 2:51
7. "Jon's Keyboard Solo" (Lord) – 6:13
8. "Knocking at Your Back Door" (Blackmore, Gillan, Glover) – 8:48
9. "Anyone's Daughter" – 3:47

==== Disc two ====
10. "Child in Time" – 10:12
11. "Anya" (Gillan, Blackmore, Glover, Lord) – 7:16
12. "The Battle Rages On" (Blackmore, Gillan, Lord, Paice) – 6:23
13. "Lazy & Drum Solo" – 7:21
14. "Space Truckin'" – 2:42
15. "Woman from Tokyo" – 2:22
16. "Paint It Black" (Jagger, Richards) – 7:04
17. "Hush" (South) – 3:22
18. "Smoke on the Water" – 9:41

== Personnel ==
Deep Purple

- Ritchie Blackmore – guitars
- Ian Gillan – vocals
- Jon Lord – keyboards
- Roger Glover – bass guitar
- Ian Paice – drums
