= In the Absence of Pink =

Live album by Deep Purple
- Released: 29 July 1991
- Recorded: 22 June 1985
- Venues: Knebworth Festival, UK
- Genres: Hard rock, heavy metal
- Length: 100:00
- Label: Connoisseur Collection

Deep Purple live albums chronology
Scandinavian Nights (1988)	In the Absence of Pink (1991)	Gemini Suite Live (1993)

In the Absence of Pink is a live album released by Deep Purple. It was originally recorded by BBC Radio on the reunited Mk II Purple's first UK gig after reforming in 1984, at the Knebworth Festival on Saturday 22 June 1985. Several of the supporting artists were also recorded, and they – together with Deep Purple – were broadcast on BBC Radio 1 the following Saturday during a programme called 'Knebworth Through The Night', which ran from 2200 to 0400.

The original double CD version was released in 1991.

== Album content and missing songs ==
"Under the Gun" for some reason was not recorded by the BBC and with a short version of "Woman from Tokyo" were the only omissions from the normal set-list performed on the world tour. Although "Child in Time" was sometimes featured, it was not performed at this concert.

The group's set opens with Jon Lord playing the toccata from "Toccata and Fugue in D-minor" by Johann Sebastian Bach.

"Difficult to Cure" is an adaptation of Beethoven's "Ode to Joy" from the 9th Symphony and was recorded by Blackmore's Rainbow some years earlier.

The version of "Lazy" on this album could not be found on the BBC tapes, and consequently was taken from a bootleg.

== Title origin ==
The title is taken from the words of Ian Gillan introducing "Gypsy's Kiss". Referring to the rain and the technical problems that delayed the start of the set, he states "What we all need now is a tremendous amount of pink. But, in the absence of pink, here's some blues".

== Track listing ==
All songs written by Ritchie Blackmore, Ian Gillan, Roger Glover, Jon Lord and Ian Paice except where indicated.

Disc one
No.	Title	Length
1.	"Highway Star"	6:57
2.	"Nobody's Home"	4:08
3.	"Strange Kind of Woman"	8:47
4.	"Gypsy's Kiss" (Blackmore, Gillan, Glover)	6:20
5.	"Perfect Strangers" (Blackmore, Gillan, Glover)	6:54
6.	"Lazy"	7:03
7.	"Knocking at Your Back Door" (Blackmore, Gillan, Glover)	9:10

Disc two
No.	Title	Length
1.	"Difficult to Cure" (Ludwig van Beethoven, Blackmore, Glover, Don Airey)	9:23
2.	"Space Truckin'"	14:49
3.	"Speed King"	10:12
4.	"Black Night"	6:43
5.	"Smoke on the Water"	10:24

== Personnel ==
Deep Purple

- Ritchie Blackmore – guitars
- Ian Gillan – vocals
- Roger Glover – bass
- Jon Lord – keyboards
- Ian Paice – drums
