= Come Hell or High Water =

1994 live album by Deep Purple

Live album by Deep Purple
- Released: 31 October 1994
- Recorded: Hanns-Martin-Schleyer-Halle, Stuttgart, Germany, 16 October and Birmingham NEC, Birmingham, England, 9 November 1993
- Genre: Hard rock, heavy metal
- Length: 77:19
- Label: RCA/BMG
- Producer: Pat Regan

Deep Purple live albums chronology
Gemini Suite Live (1993)	Come Hell or High Water (1994)	King Biscuit Flower Hour Presents: Deep Purple in Concert (1995)

Singles from Come Hell or High Water
- 1. "Anyone's Daughter" / "Speed King" Released: October 1994

Come Hell or High Water

Video by Deep Purple
- Released: 1994
- Recorded: Birmingham NEC, Birmingham, England, 9 November 1993
- Genre: Hard rock, heavy metal
- Length: 120:00
- Label: BMG
- Director: Hugh Symonds
- Producer: Lana Topham

Deep Purple video chronology
Come Hell or High Water (1994)	Bombay Calling (1995)

Professional ratings
Review scores
Source	Rating
AllMusic	1/5 stars
Collector's Guide to Heavy Metal	7/10

Come Hell or High Water is a CD and DVD by British rock band Deep Purple. It was recorded on 16 October 1993 at Hanns-Martin-Schleyer-Halle in Stuttgart and at the NEC in Birmingham on 9 November.

The album is one of the last to feature Ritchie Blackmore, as he quit after the concert on 17 November 1993 in Helsinki. He was replaced by Joe Satriani for the rest of the tour and later by Steve Morse.

== Recording ==
This live performance is well known for Blackmore's erratic behaviour on stage. The band opened with Highway Star without Blackmore who did not enter the stage until his guitar solo section approximately 3:00 in. For unknown reasons, he took issue with the presence of a cameraman filming behind Ian Gillian on the opposite side of the stage. In the midst of his solo, he looked around for a projectile object and threw a cup of water at the cameraman. The band was confused by the commotion but finished the song, then Blackmore promptly returned to his dressing room and would not continue the show until the cameraman was removed. Blackmore claimed to have agreed to the show's filming on the condition that no cameras were onstage or between the band and the audience. Others claimed it to be "nonsense" and it was suggested that the guitarist was aiming it at Gillan. The on-stage tension between the band resulted in several truncated guitar solo spots and at the end of the concert, Blackmore makes a brief cordial gesture toward the band then quickly exits on stage-right before the other band members wave their goodbyes to the audience and exit to the left.

The rest of the band's dissatisfaction with the behaviour of their soon-to-be-departed guitarist is evident in their interviews and unsurprisingly, Blackmore is the only one who is not featured in this segment.

The CD features songs from the Stuttgart show, with the exception of "Anyone's Daughter", taken from Birmingham.

The full concert versions of the Stuttgart and Birmingham shows were released in 2006 as a four CD box-set Live in Europe 1993 by Sony/BMG, each concert having its own gatefold sleeve and paper CD-liners. In 2007 each show had a separate release, in a jewel-case, but the Birmingham show was soon deleted, due to Ian Gillan's protest about it being re-released.

== CD track listing ==
All songs written by Ritchie Blackmore, Ian Gillan, Roger Glover, Jon Lord and Ian Paice except where indicated.

1. "Highway Star" – 6:40
2. "Black Night" – 5:40
3. "A Twist in the Tale" (Blackmore, Gillan, Glover) – 4:27
4. "Perfect Strangers" (Blackmore, Gillan, Glover) – 6:52
5. "Anyone's Daughter" – 3:57
6. "Child in Time" – 10:48
7. "Anya" (Blackmore, Gillan, Glover, Lord) – 12:13
8. "Speed King" – 7:29
9. "Smoke on the Water" – 10:26

=== US/Japanese track listing ===
1. "Highway Star" – 6:40
2. "Black Night" – 5:40
3. "A Twist in the Tale" (Blackmore, Gillan, Glover) – 4:27
4. "Perfect Strangers" (Blackmore, Gillan, Glover) – 6:52
5. "Anyone's Daughter" – 3:57
6. "Child in Time" – 10:48
7. "Anya" (Blackmore, Gillan, Glover, Lord) – 12:13
8. "Lazy" – 4:18
9. "Space Truckin'" – 2:39
10. "Woman from Tokyo" – 1:53
11. "Speed King" – 7:29
12. "Smoke on the Water" – 10:26

== DVD track listing ==
1. "Highway Star"
2. "Black Night"
3. "Talk About Love"
4. "A Twist in the Tale"
5. "Perfect Strangers"
6. "Beethoven's Ninth"
7. "Knocking at Your Back Door"
8. "Anyone's Daughter"
9. "Child in Time"
10. "Anya"
11. "The Battle Rages On"
12. "Lazy"
13. "Space Truckin'"
14. "Woman From Tokyo"
15. "Paint It Black"
16. "Smoke on the Water"
- Besides the actual concert, there are interpolated interviews of all the band members, except Ritchie Blackmore.

== Personnel ==
Deep Purple

- Ian Gillan – vocals
- Ritchie Blackmore – guitars
- Jon Lord – organ, keyboards
- Roger Glover – bass
- Ian Paice – drums

Production

- Pat Regan – producer, engineer, mixing at New Century Media Studios, Los Angeles
- George Marino – mastering at Sterling Sound, New York

== Charts ==
Chart performance for Come Hell or High Water
Chart (1994)	Peak position
Finnish Albums (The Official Finnish Charts)	37
Japanese Albums (Oricon)	30

== Certifications ==
DVD certifications for Come Hell or High Water
Region	Certification	Certified units/sales
Australia (ARIA)	Platinum	15,000^{^}
United Kingdom (BPI)	Gold	25,000^{*}
^{*} Sales figures based on certification alone.^{^} Shipments figures based on certification alone.
