= List of commercially released bootlegs =

This article describes various bootleg recordings that have subsequently seen a commercial release. Because bootlegs are issued without the consent of an artist's record label, that artist may not receive any royalties from its release, and there is no guarantee of the sound quality and authenticity of the bootleg. To counteract this, while still meeting demand for the recordings, some artists have given bootleg recordings an official release.

Artist	Release(s)	Notes
Black Sabbath	Past Lives (2002)	The double-CD release Past Lives contains tracks from the previously unsanctioned release Live at Last, plus selected tracks from the unreleased (but widely circulated) bootlegs most commonly known as Paris 1970 and Live in '75.
Deep Purple	Deep Purple in Concert (1980); Live In London (1982); Scandinavian Nights (1988); In the Absence of Pink (1991)	Deep Purple have released several bootlegs officially, particularly those recorded and broadcast by radio stations, which therefore have good sound quality. Deep Purple in Concert featured two "in-concert" recordings for BBC Radio 1 in 1970 and 1972, while Live in London contained a similar recording from 1974. Scandinavian Nights contained a recording of a 1970 gig in Stockholm that was recorded by Swedish radio. Several other bootlegs of early Deep Purple performances have been remastered and "officially" released by the Deep Purple Appreciation Society and Purple Records, including Aachen 1970 and Montreux 1969. Clinton Heylin suggests that the release of numerous live recordings has greatly suppressed the market for any bootlegs featuring the band.
The Doors	Boot Yer Butt: The Doors Bootlegs (1993)	The Doors four disc box set contains many bootlegged concert tracks that sold worldwide over the years. Only 5,000 units were made. It has become one of the biggest collector's items in the entire Doors catalogue.
Bob Dylan	The Bootleg Series Volumes 1-3 (Rare & Unreleased) 1961-1991 (1991); The Bootleg Series Vol. 4: Bob Dylan Live 1966, The "Royal Albert Hall" Concert (1998); The Bootleg Series Vol. 5: Bob Dylan Live 1975, The Rolling Thunder Revue (2002); The Bootleg Series Vol. 6: Bob Dylan Live 1964, Concert at Philharmonic Hall (2004); The Bootleg Series Vol. 7: No Direction Home: The Soundtrack (2005); The Bootleg Series Vol. 8: Tell Tale Signs: Rare and Unreleased 1989-2006 (2008); The Bootleg Series Vol. 9:The Witmark Demos (2010); The Bootleg Series Vol. 10: Another Self Portrait (1969–1971) (2010); The Bootleg Series Vol. 11: The Basement Tapes Complete (2014); The Bootleg Series Vol. 12: The Cutting Edge 1965-1966 (2015); The Bootleg Series Vol. 13: Trouble No More 1979–1981 (2017); The Bootleg Series Vol. 14: More Blood, More Tracks (2018); The Bootleg Series Vol. 15 Travelin' Thru, 1967-1969 (2019); The Bootleg Series Vol.16 Springtime in New York 1980-1985 (2021)	Sixteen official volumes.
Emerson, Lake & Palmer	The Original Bootleg Series from the Manticore Vaults: Volume One (2001); The Original Bootleg Series from the Manticore Vaults: Volume Two (2001); The Original Bootleg Series from the Manticore Vaults: Volume Three (2001); The Original Bootleg Series from the Manticore Vaults: Volume Four (2006)	Multi-box set "official" release of commercial ELP bootlegs on Castle Records, containing live recordings from 1970-1993. Includes audience and soundboard recordings. Quality varies, but mostly listenable.
Rory Gallagher	The G-Man Bootleg Series Vol.1 (1992); Meeting With The G-Man (2004)	
Iron Maiden	Europe 1992 (1992)	A Real Live Dead One is the most similar "real" album for that.
Elton John	17-11-70 (1971)	Radio concert album released in response to bootleg sales.
R. Kelly	Loveland (2002)	Kelly scrapped the original album due to bootlegging, recorded several new tracks and released the album as Chocolate Factory.
King Crimson	The Night Watch (1973, 1997); King Crimson on Broadway (1995, 1999)	The Night Watch's concert was broadcast live by the BBC on 23 November 1973; bootlegs tapes of the broadcast circulated among fans. The 1997 release was one of the first releases of archival recordings by DGM. King Crimson On Broadway was recorded in 1995 and released through the King Crimson Collectors' Club in 1999.
Led Zeppelin	Led Zeppelin BBC Sessions (1997)	Material from three different 1969 sessions and a 1971 concert from the Paris Theatre in London, recorded by the BBC. Countless bootlegs of these recordings circulated for years before the official release.
Mayhem	Live in Jessheim (1990, 2017); Live in Sarpsborg (1995, 2017)	Recordings of live shows from 3 February 1990 in Jessheim and 28 February the same year in Sarpsborg, respectively. Originally released in 1995 by Colombian label Warmaster Records as The Dawn of the Black Hearts, the latter is infamous for its graphic cover art, which features a genuine photo of lead singer Dead after he died by a self-inflicted shotgun wound. Peaceville officially released both albums in 2017, re-titling the latter and replacing its infamous photo of the with an image of the band's bassist, Necrobutcher
Morly Grey	The Only Truth (2002)	Illegal release on Akarma in 2002 of the Starshine Records album.
Morphine	Bootleg Detroit (2000)	The only authorized release of a live recording of Morphine. Recorded by a fan, then edited and mixed under Mark Sandman’s supervision.
Nirvana	Incesticide (1992); With the Lights Out (2004); Sliver: The Best of the Box (2005)	Much of the "previously-unreleased" material on these collections had already been circulated among fans (albeit in lower quality).
Napalm Death	Bootlegged in Japan (1998)	
Pink Floyd	Pulse DVD; The Dark Side of the Moon Immersion box set; Wish You Were Here Immersion box set; The Wall Immersion box set	Special features include Bootlegging the Bootleggers, assembled from video provided by Pink Floyd historian Vernon Fitch, combined with official soundboard recordings, and edited together. The bootleg of The Dark Side of the Moon was issued a mere six weeks after the concert, about a full year prior to an official release. Professionally packaged, the unit reportedly sold in excess of 100,000 copies, many thinking it was the real thing. The "Immersion" boxed set versions of The Dark Side of the Moon and Wish You Were Here, released as part of the Why Pink Floyd...? reissue campaign both included a disc with selections from the band's show at the Empire Pool, Wembley in November 1974, which was recorded and broadcast by the BBC and consequently extensively bootlegged. While The Wall "Immersion" contains demos from the album's various stages in production.
Mike Portnoy	Multiple Dream Theater recordings	Portnoy founded the YtseJam Records bootleg label, and is one of the most vocal pro-bootleg musicians despite his band not having a clear audience taping policy.
Elvis Presley	The Million Dollar Quartet (1981-1990/2006); FTD - New Year's Eve (2003); FTD - Closing Night (2004); Close Up (fourth disc) (2003); Takin' Tahoe Night (2003); FTD - Southern Nights (2006); FTD - Unchained Melody (2007)	The Million Dollar Quartet session took place on December 4, 1956 at Sun Studios in Memphis, Tennessee. The session was performed by Elvis Presley, Johnny Cash, Jerry Lee Lewis and Carl Perkins. The first release of this session was a 1981 bootleg with several tracks. It was released more times over the years until 1990, when RCA officially released it, direct from Elvis' tape of the session. In 2006, more of the session was released. The New Year's Eve concert from 1976 was one of Elvis' longest shows. This release was an audience recording in 1977 as the name of Rockin' With Elvis On New Year's Eve. It was a two LP set and is considered as one of the best audience recordings. In 2003, the same source tape was used for an FTD/RCA release entitled New Year's Eve. The Funny Side of Elvis and The King Goes Bananas are audience recordings from a September 3, 1973 Closing Show in Vegas that was released in the 1990s. This concert was one of Elvis' most unusual, with him clowning around on most of the songs. Most of the soundboard of this show was released in 2004 by FTD/RCA under the name Closing Night. Three of the songs performed in the movie Elvis on Tour come from an April 18, 1972 concert in San Antonio, Texas. This was released as a soundboard in 1993 under the name Welcome to San Antonio under the Vicky label but RCA released the stereo source tape of this show on Disc 4 in the box set Close Up in 2003. A May 13, 1973 concert in Lake Tahoe was first released, mastered from an audience recording, sometime in the 1990s. In 2003, FTD/RCA used a soundboard recording of the show for Takin' Tahoe Night. FTD released Southern Nights with many songs from various bootlegs that contain songs recorded in April–June, 1975. The songs were cut in Atlanta, Macon, Memphis, Houston, Lake Charles, Huntsville and Mobile. Yet another FTD release, Unchained Melody, has songs from some bootlegs as well. The standout track is a recording of "Where No One Stands Alone", the only time he ever sang it.
Prince	The Black Album (1994)	Studio album initially shelved in 1987 and widely bootlegged since. Other previously bootlegged material appeared on several official released albums. Most notably Crystal Ball (1998) and The Vault: Old Friends 4 Sale (1999).
Public Image Ltd.	Paris au Printemps (1980)	An official recording released (despite leader John Lydon's declared hatred for live albums) specifically to suppress bootlegs from that tour, including one of the two concerts these uncirculated soundboards were taken from.
Rolling Stones	Live at Leeds 1971 on Sticky Fingers Super Deluxe edition (2015)	This concert was broadcast in mono on BBC in abridged form, and it was heavily bootlegged under various titles (e.g. 'Charlie Watts live at Leeds' or 'The flamin' groupie'. The remixed stereo recording with the missing songs was released with the extended Sticky Fingers album.
Rush	Rush ABC: Live from Cleveland’s Agora Ballroom 1974 (2011)	Originally unofficially released in 2001 under the title The Fifth Order of Angels, officially released by Left Field Media in 2011. Tracks from the 1974 performance have been around in bootleg form since they were recorded and aired on Cleveland’s WMMS FM. Donna Halper does the introductions. Of interest are the band’s previously unreleased recordings of “Fancy Dancer,” “Bad Boy,” and “Garden Road,” as well as the live version of “Here Again,” which is an overlooked piece.
Sex Pistols	Spunk (2006)	Bootleg of demos originally released in 1977, officially released by Sanctuary Records in 2006.
Swans	Real Love (1992)	An early 1990s bootleg. Most other Swans live albums began as bootleg-style recordings made by band members or crew.
Tangerine Dream	The Bootleg Box Set Vol. 1; The Bootleg Box Set Vol. 2; Seven individual concerts in the Bootmoon series	Most included concerts were at some point released as commercial bootlegs, but the released versions in these series are based on the Tangerine Tree project. Confusingly, two of the nine volumes in the Bootmoon series (Cleveland and Brighton 1986) were however from the band's official live recording archives, and also included in their "Vault" series of releases.
Frank Zappa	Beat the Boots! (1991); Beat the Boots! II (1992)	Reproduced directly from bootleg discs. Zappa also copied the packaging directly from the bootleg releases, adding no additional material other than a cardboard box, a beret, a badge and a memorabilia scrapbook.

== See also ==
- The Beatles bootleg recordings
- Bob Dylan bootleg recordings
- Led Zeppelin bootleg recordings
- Pink Floyd bootleg recordings
- Pearl Jam Official Bootlegs
