= Slaves and Masters =

Studio album by Deep Purple
- Released: 22 October 1990
- Recorded: Late 1989-June 1990
- Studios: Greg Rike Productions, Altamonte Springs, Florida; Sountec Studios, Connecticut; Power Station, New York City
- Genre: Hard rock
- Length: 46:51
- Label: RCA
- Producer: Roger Glover

Deep Purple chronology
The House of Blue Light (1987)	Slaves and Masters (1990)	The Battle Rages On... (1993)

Singles from Slave and Masters
- 1. "King of Dreams" Released: 1 October 1990; 2. "Love Conquers All" Released: 11 February 1991

Slaves and Masters is the thirteenth studio album by the English rock band Deep Purple, and was released on 22 October 1990. This is the only Deep Purple album to feature lead vocalist Joe Lynn Turner, who had joined the previous year after the firing of Ian Gillan. The band also auditioned singer Jimi Jamison, but other obligations made him unavailable

Following its release, Slaves and Masters peaked at No. 87 on the US Billboard 200 chart. The album dramatically sold below expectations, as compared to Deep Purple's previous album, The House of Blue Light with Gillan, which charted at No. 34 in the US. A song from the Slaves and Masters recording sessions was rearranged for the soundtrack of the 1990 movie Fire, Ice and Dynamite. Jon Lord did not play on the song, which was performed by the four other members of the Mark V Deep Purple line-up.

Despite underwhelming album sales, Deep Purple had a relatively successful tour in support of Slaves and Masters in 1991, especially for the band's European leg. Turner was still a member of the group when they began writing and recording their next album in 1992, but under duress from managers who were eyeing a 25th anniversary tour, Deep Purple ultimately decided to bring back the Mark II line-up for their 1993 studio album The Battle Rages On... A handful of working tracks originally intended for the follow-up to Slaves and Masters would turn up on subsequent solo releases by Turner.

"Too Much Is Not Enough" had been recorded by Turner for the unreleased follow-up of his first solo album Rescue You, and it was also recorded by Paul Rodgers and Kenney Jones band The Law but they didn't release it, either. Turner's original version can be found on the bootleg Demos '88 - 91' and The Law version on The Law II bootleg. Turner re-recorded the song for his album Hurry Up and Wait (1998).

== Promotional videos ==
The album was promoted on television with music videos to the songs "King of Dreams" and "Love Conquers All", both featuring the band. Directed by James Foley, the video for "King of Dreams" was shot at Santa Cruz Beach Boardwalk and featured actress Betsy Lynn George, who had starred in the video for Billy Idol's "Cradle of Love" earlier that year. The video for "Love Conquers All" was directed by Storm Thorgerson, formerly of legendary album cover design team Hipgnosis.

== Live performances ==
The band played most of the songs from the album on their 1991 world tour, with the set list also including two songs - "Burn" and "Hey Joe" - which had always been vetoed by Ian Gillan. Deep Purple have not played any songs from Slaves and Masters live since the 1991 tour. Joe Lynn Turner has occasionally performed "King of Dreams", "The Cut Runs Deep" and "Love Conquers All" during solo performances. Turner also performed "King of Dreams" alongside another former Deep Purple member, Glenn Hughes, as part of the set list of the Hughes Turner Project's European and Japanese tours in 2002. This version can be found on HTP's live album Live in Tokyo (2002).

== Reception ==
Professional ratings
Review scores
Source	Rating
AllMusic	2/5 stars
Collector's Guide to Heavy Metal	7/10
Record Collector	3/5 stars

Following its release, Slaves and Masters was met with mixed reception from critics. AllMusic's Alex Henderson retrospectively gave the album a negative review, saying that "the songwriting is weak and pedestrian, and most of the time, the once-mighty Purple (who were at least 16 years past their prime) sound like a generic Foreigner wannabe". The same concept was expressed in the reviews by journalists Martin Popoff and Joel McIver, who described Slaves and Masters "a bit like a latter-day Rainbow album" and an "extravagant piece of AOR-ness ... incredibly lightweight", respectively. However, they salvaged a few songs, such as "King of Dreams", "Love Conquers All" and "Fire in the Basement", which "make at least a reasonable effort to match Purple’s catalogue". Ultimate Classic Rock dubbed Slaves and Masters as "Deep Rainbow", criticizing the album as "worst of both worlds" for combining elements from Deep Purple and Rainbow.

Jon Lord never recognized this record as a Deep Purple album, a feeling echoed by Roger Glover. Ritchie Blackmore has said that the album is his favourite from the 1984–1993 reunion era of Deep Purple, while Joe Lynn Turner openly praised Slaves and Masters by saying it was "probably (the) last great Purple album there was (...) It's a great album, (it) stands up to these days, one of the best recorded, best written (...) I can name every title and just go...who can beat that?"

== Track listing ==
No.	Title	Writer(s)	Length
1.	"King of Dreams"	Ritchie Blackmore, Joe Lynn Turner, Roger Glover	5:26
2.	"The Cut Runs Deep"	Blackmore, Turner, Glover, Jon Lord, Ian Paice	5:42
3.	"Fire in the Basement"	Blackmore, Turner, Glover, Lord, Paice	4:43
4.	"Truth Hurts"	Blackmore, Turner, Glover	5:14
5.	"Breakfast in Bed"	Blackmore, Turner, Glover	5:17
6.	"Love Conquers All"	Blackmore, Turner, Glover	3:47
7.	"Fortuneteller"	Blackmore, Turner, Glover, Lord, Paice	5:49
8.	"Too Much Is Not Enough"	Turner, Bob Held, Al Greenwood	4:17
9.	"Wicked Ways"	Blackmore, Turner, Glover, Lord, Paice	6:33

- The vinyl edition has "Fortuneteller" as track 4, "Love Conquers All" as track 5 and "Breakfast in Bed" as track 6.

2012 Friday Music remastered edition bonus tracks
No.	Title	Writer(s)	Length
10.	"Slow Down Sister"	Blackmore, Turner, Glover, Lord, Paice	5:57
11.	"Love Conquers All" (single edit)		3:25

2013 Hear No Evil Recordings remastered edition bonus tracks
No.	Title	Length
10.	"Love Conquers All" (single edit)	3:25
11.	"King of Dreams" (single edit)	4:51
12.	"Slow Down Sister"	5:57

Fire Ice & Dynamite (Music from the Original Soundtrack)
No.	Title	Writer(s)	Length
1.	"Fire, Ice & Dynamite"	Blackmore, Glover, Turner	4:33

== Personnel ==
Deep Purple

- Joe Lynn Turner – vocals
- Ritchie Blackmore – guitar
- Roger Glover – bass, additional keyboards, production, mixing
- Jon Lord – organ, keyboards, string arrangements
- Ian Paice – drums

Additional musicians

- String orchestra led by Jesse Levy

Production notes

- Recorded in early/mid 1990 at Greg Rike Productions in Orlando, Florida
- Additional recordings at Sountec Studios Inc. and the Powerstation in New York
- Engineered by Nick Blagona
- Additional mixing by Nick Blagona at The Powerstation
- Raymond D'Addario – production assistant
- Wally Walters, Peter Hodgson, Matthew Lamonica, Dan Gellert – assistant engineers
- Mastered by Greg Calbi at Sterling Sound, New York

== Charts ==
Chart (1990–1991)	Peak position
Australian Albums (Kent Music Report)	72
Austrian Albums (Ö3 Austria)	28
Dutch Albums (Album Top 100)	72
Finnish Albums (The Official Finnish Charts)	24
German Albums (Offizielle Top 100)	23
Hungarian Albums (MAHASZ)	12
Japanese Albums (Oricon)	17
Norwegian Albums (VG-lista)	16
Swedish Albums (Sverigetopplistan)	12
Swiss Albums (Schweizer Hitparade)	5
UK Albums (Official Charts)	45
US Billboard 200	87

== Certifications ==
Region	Certification	Certified units/sales
Japan (RIAJ)	Gold	100,000^{^}
Switzerland (IFPI Switzerland)	Gold	25,000^{^}
^{^} Shipments figures based on certification alone.
