= The Battle Rages On... =

Studio album by Deep Purple
- Released: 19 July 1993
- Recorded: May 1992 – March 1993
- Studios: Bearsville (Bearsville, New York); Red Rooster (Tutzing, Germany); Greg Rike (Altamonte Springs, Florida)
- Genre: Hard rock
- Length: 49.26
- Label: RCA
- Producers: Thom Panunzio; Roger Glover

Deep Purple chronology
Slaves and Masters (1990)	The Battle Rages On... (1993)	Purpendicular (1996)

Singles from The Battle Rages On...
- 1. "Anya" Released: 28 June 1993 (EU); 2. "Time to Kill" Released: 1993 (EU)

Ritchie Blackmore chronology
Slaves and Masters (1990)	The Battle Rages On... (1993)	Stranger in Us All (1995)

The Battle Rages On... is the fourteenth studio album by the English rock band Deep Purple, released on 19 July 1993 in Europe and on 26 July in the United Kingdom. It marked the second return of frontman Ian Gillan and was to last to feature founding member Ritchie Blackmore, prior to his second and final departure four months after release. It is the last album recorded with the band's classic Mk II line-up, which reunited for a second time (the first reunion being for 1984's Perfect Strangers).

Joe Lynn Turner was fired from the band during the early sessions, with Mike DiMeo initially chosen as his replacement. At the insistence of Jon Lord, Ian Paice and Roger Glover (as well as the band's management and record company), Ian Gillan eventually returned to the band during late 1992 in place of DiMeo, thus reforming the Mk II line-up. Gillan had to rework much of the material already existing for the album, which had been intended for Turner and/or DiMeo.

Ritchie Blackmore allegedly became infuriated by Gillan's re-writes, believing the songs were more melodic in their original versions, and he left the band for the second and final time after a show on 17 November 1993 in Helsinki, Finland. Joe Lynn Turner later quoted Blackmore referring to the album as "The cattle grazes on". American guitarist Joe Satriani joined Deep Purple as a temporary replacement for the remainder of the tour. A handful of working tracks written during The Battle Rages On... sessions would turn up on subsequent solo releases by Turner under different song titles.

== Background ==
Following the release of Slaves and Masters in 1990, Deep Purple embarked on a year-long world tour with vocalist Joe Lynn Turner. However, the album failed to meet commercial expectations compared to the band's previous releases, and both fans and the record label began calling for the reunion of the classic Mk II lineup. With the band's 25th anniversary approaching, RCA/BMG strongly favored the return of Ian Gillan, a move supported by Jon Lord, Roger Glover, and Ian Paice, while Ritchie Blackmore wished to continue working with Joe Lynn Turner. As a result, Turner left the band during the early stages of work on the follow-up album in 1992.

After Turner's departure, Blackmore recommended Mike DiMeo, then the vocalist of Riot V, as a replacement. DiMeo spent approximately three months recording demo material with Glover. However, BMG believed that the band's 25th anniversary album should feature the classic Mk II lineup, and Gillan ultimately rejoined Deep Purple in late 1992. DiMeo later recalled that the demos he recorded still exist.

By the time Gillan returned, the instrumental tracks and overall song structures for the album had already been largely completed. He rewrote most of the lyrics and vocal melodies originally intended for Turner and DiMeo to suit his own style, recording new vocals over the existing tracks. This process further intensified the tensions between Blackmore and Gillan. Blackmore reportedly believed that the original versions were superior, expressing particular dissatisfaction with the changes made to the melody and lyrics of "Time to Kill".

The album was recorded between May 1992 and March 1993 at Bearsville Studios in Bearsville, New York, Red Rooster Studios in Tutzing, Germany, and Greg Rike Studios in Altamonte Springs, Florida. The basic instrumental tracks were recorded at Bearsville under the supervision of producer Thom Panunzio, while Gillan's vocals and additional overdubs were completed in Germany and the United States following his return. Final mixing was handled by Glover and Pat Regan.

The album's title, The Battle Rages On..., is widely regarded as a reflection of the internal conflicts that persisted throughout its production. Relations between Blackmore and Gillan did not improve after the album's release, and Blackmore left Deep Purple for the second and final time following the band's performance in Helsinki, Finland, in November 1993. The remaining tour dates were completed with Joe Satriani serving as a temporary guitarist.

== Reception ==
Professional ratings
Review scores
Source	Rating
AllMusic	3/5 stars
Blogcritics	(mixed)
Collector's Guide to Heavy Metal	8/10
Rock Hard	7.0/10
Metal Hammer (GER)	7/7

The Battle Rages On... received generally favorable reviews from music critics upon its release. AllMusic critic Stephen Thomas Erlewine awarded the album three out of five stars, noting that the return of Ian Gillan reunited the members of Deep Purple's Mark II lineup. He praised the musical chemistry displayed on the album, which he considered reminiscent of Machine Head and Perfect Strangers. He also highlighted Ritchie Blackmore's guitar playing, particularly the flamenco-inspired introduction to "Anya" and the powerful performance on "A Twist in the Tale".

The German music magazine Rock Hard awarded the album 7 out of 10, while the German edition of Metal Hammer gave it a perfect score of 7 out of 7. In contrast, Entertainment Weekly published a negative review, criticizing the album's lyrics and arrangements.

In October 2024, Geoff Barton of Classic Rock ranked the album last, at number 25, in his list of Deep Purple's studio albums from worst to best. Although he praised the powerful performance on the title track, he expressed reservations about the quality of the remaining songs.

== Track listing ==
All tracks are written by Ritchie Blackmore, Ian Gillan and Roger Glover, except where noted.

No.	Title	Length
1.	"The Battle Rages On" (Blackmore, Gillan, Jon Lord, Ian Paice)	5:48
2.	"Lick It Up"	3:50
3.	"Anya" (Blackmore, Gillan, Glover, Lord)	6:28
4.	"Talk About Love"	4:05
5.	"Time to Kill"	5:44
6.	"Ramshackle Man"	5:32
7.	"A Twist in the Tale"	4:12
8.	"Nasty Piece of Work" (Blackmore, Gillan, Glover, Lord)	4:34
9.	"Solitaire"	4:35
10.	"One Man's Meat"	4:38

== Personnel ==
Deep Purple

- Ian Gillan – vocals, congas
- Ritchie Blackmore – guitars
- Roger Glover – bass guitar
- Ian Paice – drums
- Jon Lord – organ, keyboards

Production

- Produced by Thom Panunzio and Roger Glover
- Basic tracks produced by Thom Panunzio at Bearsville Studios in upstate New York (engineered by Bill Kennedy, assisted by Mike Reiter)
- Vocals and overdubs recorded at Red Rooster Studios (engineered by Hans Gemperle) in Tutzing, Germany, and Greg Rike Studios (engineered by Jason Corsaro, assisted by Wally Walton and Darren Schneider) in Orlando, Florida.
- Mixed by Pat Regan with Roger Glover at Sound on Sound Recording (engineered by Pat Regan, assisted by John Siket, Devin Emke and Peter Beckeman) in New York, and at the Ambient Recording Company (engineered by Pat Regan, assisted by Mark Conese) in Connecticut
- Mastered by George Marino at Sterling Sound in New York.

== Charts ==
Chart (1993)	Peak position
Austrian Albums (Ö3 Austria)	9
Dutch Albums (Album Top 100)	39
Finnish Albums (The Official Finnish Charts)	9
German Albums (Offizielle Top 100)	13
Japanese Albums (Oricon)	5
Norwegian Albums (VG-lista)	9
Swedish Albums (Sverigetopplistan)	8
Swiss Albums (Schweizer Hitparade)	7
UK Albums (Official Charts)	21
US Billboard 200	192

== Certifications ==
Region	Certification	Certified units/sales
Japan (RIAJ)	Gold	100,000^{^}
^{^} Shipments figures based on certification alone.
