= Smoke on the Water (disambiguation) =

"Smoke on the Water" is a 1972 song by Deep Purple.

Smoke on the Water may also refer to:

- "Smoke on the Water" (Red Foley song), a 1944 song by Red Foley
- Smoke on the Water: The Best Of, a 1994 compilation album by Deep Purple
- Smoke on the Water & Other Hits, a 2001 compilation album by Deep Purple
- Smoke on the Water (Reacher), a 2025 TV episode

== See also ==
- "Smoke on the Daughter", a Simpsons episode
