= Hard Rock Treasures =

- Directed by: Martin Melhuish
- Starring: Don Bernstine; Jeff Beck; Dimebag Darrell; James Hetfield and Tony Iommi
- Music by: Alan Silvestri
- Distributed by: 20th Century Fox
- Release date: August 8, 2005
- Running time: 86 minutes
- Country: United States
- Language: English

Hard Rock Treasures is a documentary film about Don "The Indiana Jones of Rock 'n' Roll" Bernstine from Hard Rock Cafe, when he visits musicians to try to get memorabilia from them.

Some of the memorabilia he gets includes Freddie Mercury's stage pants, the Gibson guitar Tony Iommi used on the first four Black Sabbath albums, the car James Hetfield drives in the video for Metallica's song "I Disappear", Slipknot's stage masks, the bass guitar Michael Anthony used on the recording of Van Halen's 1984 album and a drum Ian Paice used on the recording for Deep Purple's Perfect Strangers album.

The scenes with Dimebag Darrell at his home was shot just months before he was murdered on stage, playing with Damageplan.

== Cast ==
- Don Bernstine
- Rita Gilligan (first waitress at Hard Rock Cafe in London)
- Michael Anthony (Van Halen, Sammy Hagar)
- Jeff Beck (The Yardbirds, The Jeff Beck Group)
- Peter Criss (Kiss)
- Dimebag Darrell (Pantera, Damageplan)
- K.K. Downing (Judas Priest)
- John Entwistle (The Who)
- Peter Frampton (Humble Pie, The Herd)
- Ace Frehley (Kiss, Frehley's Comet)
- Rob Halford (Judas Priest, Halford, Fight, 2wo)
- Tom Hamilton (Aerosmith)
- James Hetfield (Metallica)
- Sarah Hodgson (Christie's, London)
- Tony Iommi (Black Sabbath)
- Brian Johnson (Geordie, AC/DC)
- Kerry King (Slayer)
- Joey Kramer (Aerosmith)
- Dave Kushner (Velvet Revolver)
- James Lott (producer on Sun Studios, Memphis)
- Mike Love (The Beach Boys)
- Duff McKagan (Guns N' Roses, Velvet Revolver)
- Scotty Moore (Elvis Presley)
- Vince Neil (Mötley Crüe)
- Rick Nielsen (Cheap Trick)
- Jimmy Page (Led Zeppelin)
- Ian Paice (Deep Purple, Whitesnake)
- Matt Roberts (3 Doors Down)
- James Root (Stone Sour, Slipknot)
- Richie Sambora (Bon Jovi)
- Gene Simmons (Kiss)
- Nikki Sixx (Mötley Crüe)
- Chad Smith (Red Hot Chili Peppers)
- Matt Sorum (The Cult, Guns N' Roses, Velvet Revolver)
- Paul Stanley (Kiss)
- Corey Taylor (Stone Sour, Slipknot)
- Tommy Thayer (Kiss, Black N' Blue)
- Glenn Tipton (Judas Priest)
- Scott Weiland (Stone Temple Pilots, Velvet Revolver)
- Brian Wilson (The Beach Boys)
- Zakk Wylde (Ozzy Osbourne, Black Label Society)
- James Young (Styx)

== Soundtrack ==
- 3 Doors Down - "Let Me Go"
- AC/DC - "Hells Bells"
- Aerosmith - "The Other Side"
- Black Sabbath - "Paranoid"
- Bon Jovi - "Wanted Dead or Alive"
- Cheap Trick - "Dream Police"
- Deep Purple - "Smoke on the Water"
- Elvis Presley - "That's All Right (Mama)"
- Kiss - "Detroit Rock City"
- Kiss - "I Want You"
- Led Zeppelin - "Whole Lotta Love"
- Metallica - "I Disappear"
- Mötley Crüe - "Kickstart My Heart"
- Red Hot Chili Peppers - "Give It Away"
- Styx - "Miss America"
- The Knack - "My Sharona"
- Van Halen - "Jump"
- Velvet Revolver - "Slither"

== Reception ==
P. Hall of Video Librarian praised the film, giving it 3.5 stars out of four and writing, "While music lovers will enjoy the surplus of star power, the most fascinating aspect of this film is the rare glimpse afforded viewers into the guts of the Hard Rock operations, from the storage center for all of the memorabilia to the planning of which items are displayed in the company's various cafes, hotels, and casinos. Highly recommended." In a positive review, Andy Cooper gave the film 4.5 stars out of five and wrote in Regina Leader-Post, "I don't care if this is 90 minutes of free advertising for the Hard Rock Cafe -- it's still a great little documentary about rock- and-roll royalty. From Elvis and the Beatles to Slayer and Madonna, this is the inside scoop on how Hard Rock gets the treasures that adorn the walls of its 138 restaurants."

In News From Indian Country, Sandra Hale Schulman called the documentary "an entertaining and informative account about the music artifacts acquisition process" and said it was "an intimate, behind-the-scenes look at rock 'n' roll royalty and their most prized possessions". Giving the film three stars out of four, Winston-Salem Journal's Ed Bumgardner, praised the film, stating, "the disc is an extended, undeniable advertisement for the international Hard Rock chain – but it's also a good one that wields appeal for casual fans and panting rock gearheads and geeks interested in rock's ephemera".
