= Gemini Suite Live =

1993 live album by Deep Purple

Live album by Deep Purple and the Orchestra of the Light Music Society
- Released: July 1993
- Recorded: at the Royal Festival Hall, London 17 September 1970.
- Genres: Hard rock, classical
- Length: 44:34
- Labels: RPM, Purple Records (reissue)

Deep Purple live albums chronology
In the Absence of Pink (1991)	Gemini Suite Live (1993)	Come Hell or High Water (1994)

Gemini Suite Live is a recording of Jon Lord's classical/rock piece Gemini Suite featuring the Mark II band lineup of Deep Purple, recorded live during this one and only live performance in 1970. A follow-up to their "Concerto" Project, it featured five movements for the individual members of the band, including a guitar piece from Blackmore.

== Track listing ==
All movements composed by Jon Lord.

No.	Title	Length
1.	"First Movement: Guitar, Organ" (Some editions misprint the first movement as guitar/voice)	17:23+
2.	"Second Movement: Voice, Bass" (Some editions misprint the second movement as organ/bass.)	10:19+
3.	"Third Movement: Drums, Finale"	16:52

== Personnel ==
- Conducted by Malcolm Arnold
- Ian Gillan – vocals
- Ritchie Blackmore – guitars
- Jon Lord – organ, keyboards
- Roger Glover – bass
- Ian Paice – drums
- The Orchestra of the Light Music Society
