= Scandinavian Nights =

Live album by Deep Purple
- Released: 10 October 1988
- Recorded: 12 November 1970
- Venues: Konserthuset (Stockholm, Sweden)
- Genres: Hard rock, heavy metal
- Length: 116:25
- Label: Connoisseur Collection
- Producer: Deep Purple

Deep Purple live albums chronology
Nobody's Perfect (1988)	Scandinavian Nights (1988)	In the Absence of Pink (1991)

Live and Rare CD cover

Live in Stockholm CD cover

Professional ratings
Review scores
Source	Rating
Allmusic	3/5 stars
Kerrang!	3.5/5 stars
Allmusic	(Live in Stockholm)

Scandinavian Nights (Live in Stockholm 1970) is a double live-album by the English hard rock band Deep Purple. It was recorded in the Stockholm Konserthuset on 12 November 1970. It was originally released in 1988.

== Background ==
This concert was originally recorded at the Konserthuset on 12 November 1970, by Sveriges Radio, (Swedish National Radio), and first broadcast part of it on the 14th, on a live concert radio show called "Midnight Hour" with the remaining tracks broadcast in 1982 in a show called "Rock Från Underjorden" ("Rock From The Underworld").

A Bootleg of the full show called "Alive Tribute To Wally" appeared in the mid 80's.

The tapes were re-mixed by Tom Leader at Angel Recording Studios in London, and officially released in October 1988, under the title of "Scandinavian Nights" in Europe. It remains the prime example of the early Mk II set. Songs from the then-current album Deep Purple in Rock together with long instrumental sections. In the US, the double CD, released in 1992, was titled "Live and Rare".

The original master tapes were later discovered and remixed for a re-release as Live in Stockholm by Purple Records in 2005, with improved sound quality. This release is the most complete version of the concert. MC Introduction and all the interludes between the different songs are complete and the tracks appear in the right order as played on the night.

A new edition of the album, titled Stockholm 1970, was released in 2014 by EDEL as part of "The Official Deep Purple (Overseas) Live Series" with additional material: two songs recorded for "Pop Deux" in Paris in 1970, a contemporary Jon Lord interview; and a bonus DVD with Deep Purple's performance, "Doing Their Thing", at Granada TV in 1970, previously released on VHS.

== Scandinavian Nights (Live in Stockholm 1970) ==
(2 LP Vinyl / 2 CD Editions) (Connoisseur Collection) (1988 mix)

All tracks are written by Ritchie Blackmore, Ian Gillan, Roger Glover, Jon Lord, Ian Paice except where indicated.

CD Disc One / LP Side One
No.	Title	Writer(s)	Length
1.	"Wring That Neck"	Blackmore, Nick Simper, Lord, Paice	32:06

CD Disc One / LP Side Two
No.	Title	Writer(s)	Length
2.	"Speed King"		10:20
3.	"Into the Fire"		04:00
4.	"Paint It Black"	Mick Jagger, Keith Richards	09:08

CD Disc Two / LP Side Three
No.	Title	Writer(s)	Length
5.	"Mandrake Root"	Rod Evans, Blackmore, Lord	28:42

CD Disc Two / LP Side Four
No.	Title	Length
6.	"Child in Time"	17:25
7.	"Black Night"	06:54

== Live in Stockholm (Konserthuset 12 Nov. 1970) ==
(2 CD Edition) (Purple Records) (2005 mix)

CD Disc One
No.	Title	Length
1.	"Introduction"	02:12
2.	"Speed King"	11:16
3.	"Into the Fire"	05:18
4.	"Child in Time"	19:04
5.	"Wring That Neck"	30:59

CD Disc Two
No.	Title	Length
6.	"Paint It, Black"	12:11
7.	"Mandrake Root"	31:41
8.	"Black Night"	07:10

== Stockholm 1970 ==
(2 CD & 1 DVD / 3 LP Vinyl Editions) (Deep Purple (Overseas) Live Series) (2014 mix)

CD Disc One: Konserthuset, Stockholm, 12 November 1970
No.	Title	Length
1.	"Speed King"	12:30
2.	"Into the Fire"	05:00
3.	"Child in Time"	19:00
4.	"Wring That Neck"	32:04
5.	"Paint It, Black"	10:44

CD Disc Two: Konserthuset, Stockholm, 12 November 1970
No.	Title	Length
6.	"Mandrake Root"	30:37
7.	"Black Night"	07:20

Bonus Tracks: "Pop Deux" / "Pop 2" Live at Musicorama, La Taverne, L'Olympia, Paris, 8 October 1970
No.	Title	Length
8.	"Wring That Neck (edit)"	11:02
9.	"Mandrake Root (edit)"	14:46
10.	"Jon Lord Interview (1971)"	10:46

Bonus DVD: "Doing Their Thing" Live at Granada TV Studios, Manchester, 14 July 1970
No.	Title	Length
1.	"Speed King (edit)"	03:07
2.	"Child in Time"	09:35
3.	"Wring That Neck (edit)"	04:22
4.	"Mandrake Root (edit)"	06:11

== Personnel ==
=== Deep Purple ===
- Ritchie Blackmore : guitar
- Ian Gillan : vocals, percussion
- Roger Glover : bass
- Jon Lord : organ, keyboards
- Ian Paice : drums, percussion

== Charts ==
=== Re-release ===
Year	Chart	Position
2005	Sweden (V5)	55
2014	Belgium (Vl)	107
2014	Belgium (Wa)	187
