= The Sunflower Jam =

British charity supporting alternative medicine

The Sunflower Jam is a British charity registered in England and Wales (1138401) since 2010, founded by Jacky Paice, wife of Deep Purple drummer, Ian Paice. Other high-profile supporters are the actor Jeremy Irons, ex-Jamiroquai bassist Nick Fyffe, Iron Maiden singer Bruce Dickinson, Queen guitarist Brian May, and Charles, King of the United Kingdom.

== Aims ==
The aims of the charity are to fund complementary therapists and spiritual healers to work on cancer wards in the National Health Service. After setting up a meeting between members of Deep Purple and a young boy dying of leukemia, Paice saw "all the good work the healers were doing" and decided to "find a way to raise money to get more healers in there."

== Response ==
The Sunflower Jam has been criticised in the British Medical Journal for its fundraising activities in support of The College of Medicine, an alternative medicine lobby group in the UK linked to King Charles III. "Superjam" concerts run by the Sunflower Jam have raised thousands of pounds to fund complementary therapists or "healers", as they are described on the event website, to work with children in NHS cancer wards.
