= The House of Blue Light =

Studio album by Deep Purple
- Released: 12 January 1987
- Recorded: April-August 1986; September 1986 (mixing)
- Studios: The Playhouse, Stowe, Vermont, USA with Le Mobile Studio
- Genres: Hard rock; heavy metal
- Length: 50:38
- Labels: Polydor, Mercury (US)
- Producers: Roger Glover, Deep Purple

Deep Purple chronology
Perfect Strangers (1984)	The House of Blue Light (1987)	Slaves and Masters (1990)

Singles from The House of Blue Light
- 1. "Call of the Wild" Released: February 1987; 2. "Bad Attitude" Released: 1987

Professional ratings
Review scores
Source	Rating
AllMusic	3/5 stars
Collector's Guide to Heavy Metal	10/10
Kerrang!	4.5/5 stars
Rolling Stone	(favourable)

The House of Blue Light is the twelfth studio album by English rock band Deep Purple, released on 12 January 1987 by Polydor Records. It was the second recording by the reformed Mark II line-up, and the sixth studio album overall by this formation of the band.

== Recording ==
The album's creation was an exceedingly long and difficult process, which singer Ian Gillan compared to the recording of Who Do We Think We Are in Rome and Frankfurt. Gillan has remarked on how strained relations within the band compromised the album: "I look back at House of Blue Light, there are some good songs on that record, but there’s something missing in the overall album. I can’t feel the spirit of this band. I can see or hear five professionals doing their best, but it’s like a football team, it’s not functioning. It’s like 11 superstars that are playing on the same field but are not connected by the heart or by the spirit." Guitarist Ritchie Blackmore has said much of it was re-recorded, and confessed, "I think I played like shit on it, and I don't think anyone else really got that into it." Organist Jon Lord later said, "House of Blue Light was a weird album and hard to put together. We made the massive mistake of trying to make our music current. We discovered that people didn't want us to do that."

Despite the band's concerns, House of Blue Light sold well. It hit No. 10 in the UK charts, No. 34 on the Billboard 200 in the United States, and reached the top 10 in six other countries.

== Promotion ==
Two promotional videos to the songs "Bad Attitude" and "Call of the Wild" were produced, both of which feature members of the band.

== Track listing ==
All tracks are written by Ritchie Blackmore, Ian Gillan and Roger Glover, except where noted.

1987 CD edition
No.	Title	Writer(s)	Length
1.	"Bad Attitude"	Blackmore, Gillan, Glover, Jon Lord	5:04
2.	"The Unwritten Law"	Blackmore, Gillan, Glover, Ian Paice	4:54
3.	"Call of the Wild"	Blackmore, Gillan, Glover, Lord	4:48
4.	"Mad Dog"		4:36
5.	"Black & White"	Blackmore, Gillan, Glover, Lord	4:39
6.	"Hard Lovin' Woman"		3:25
7.	"The Spanish Archer"		5:31
8.	"Strangeways"		7:36
9.	"Mitzi Dupree"		5:05
10.	"Dead or Alive"		5:00

Vinyl, cassette and 1999 CD edition
No.	Title	Writer(s)	Length
1.	"Bad Attitude"	Blackmore, Gillan, Glover, Lord	4:32
2.	"The Unwritten Law"	Blackmore, Gillan, Glover, Paice	4:34
3.	"Call of the Wild"	Blackmore, Gillan, Glover, Lord	4:48
4.	"Mad Dog"		4:29
5.	"Black & White"	Blackmore, Gillan, Glover, Lord	3:39
6.	"Hard Lovin' Woman"		3:25
7.	"The Spanish Archer"		4:56
8.	"Strangeways"		5:56
9.	"Mitzi Dupree"		5:05
10.	"Dead or Alive"		4:42

Note: Several tracks on the LP and cassette versions are shorter than those on the original CD released in 1987. The 1999 CD remaster used the original vinyl master tapes, meaning its running time is also shorter than the original CD version.

== Personnel ==
Deep Purple

- Ian Gillan – vocals, congas, harmonica
- Ritchie Blackmore – guitars, guitar synthesizer
- Roger Glover – bass guitar, synthesizers, bass guitar synthesizer, sequencer, sampler
- Jon Lord – Hammond organ, synthesizers, electric piano, sampler
- Ian Paice – drums, percussion

Production

- Produced by Roger Glover and Deep Purple
- Recorded at the Playhouse, Stowe, Vermont, with Le Mobile operated by Guy Charbonneau
- Engineered by Nick Blagona
- Mixed by Harry Schnitzler at Union Studios, Munich, West Germany
- Mastered by Greg Calbi at Sterling Sound, New York

== Charts ==
=== Weekly charts ===
Chart (1987)	Peak position
Australian Albums (Kent Music Report)	39
Austrian Albums (Ö3 Austria)	11
Canada Top Albums/CDs (RPM)	51
Dutch Albums (Album Top 100)	11
Finnish Albums (The Official Finnish Charts)	1
German Albums (Offizielle Top 100)	1
Italian Albums (Musica e Dischi)	15
Japanese Albums (Oricon)	9
New Zealand Albums (RMNZ)	25
Norwegian Albums (VG-lista)	2
Spanish Albums (AFYVE)	17
Swedish Albums (Sverigetopplistan)	1
Swiss Albums (Schweizer Hitparade)	3
UK Albums (Official Charts)	10
US Billboard 200	34

=== Monthly charts ===
Monthly chart performance for The House of Blue Light
Chart (1988)	Peak position
Soviet Albums (Moskovskij Komsomolets)	1

=== Year-end charts ===
Chart (1987)	Position
German Albums (Offizielle Top 100)	49

== Certifications ==
Region	Certification	Certified units/sales
Canada (Music Canada)	Gold	50,000^{^}
Switzerland (IFPI Switzerland)	Gold	25,000^{^}
United Kingdom (BPI)	Silver	60,000^{^}
United States (RIAA)	Gold	500,000^{^}
Summaries
Worldwide	—	2,500,000
^{^} Shipments figures based on certification alone.
