= Smoke on the Water: The Best Of =

Compilation album by Deep Purple
- Released: July 1994
- Genres: Hard rock, heavy metal
- Length: 77:08
- Label: EMI France

Deep Purple compilations chronology
Knocking at Your Back Door: The Best of Deep Purple in the 80's (1992)	Smoke on the Water: The Best Of (1994)	30: Very Best of Deep Purple (1998)

Smoke on the Water: The Best Of is a compilation album by the English hard rock band Deep Purple in 1994. It was first released in France where it sold very well, attaining double gold disc status in December 1998. It was subsequently released in other countries, like Italy, Australia and New Zealand.

== Track listing ==
All titles composed by Ritchie Blackmore, Ian Gillan, Roger Glover, Jon Lord, Ian Paice, except where indicated

1. "Hush" (Joe South) – 4:20
2. "Kentucky Woman" (Single edit) (Neil Diamond) – 4:05
3. "The Bird Has Flown" (Single edit) (Blackmore, Lord, Rod Evans) – 2:52
4. "Hallelujah" (Roger Greenaway, Roger Cook) – 3:41
5. "Black Night" – 3:24
6. "Child in Time" – 10:16
7. "Speed King" (Dutch single edit) – 4:22
8. "Strange Kind of Woman" (Single edit) – 3:45
9. "Fireball" (Single edit) – 3:19
10. "Smoke on the Water" (US single edit) – 3:44
11. "Highway Star" – 6:05
12. "Never Before" (Single edit) – 3:27
13. "Space Truckin'" – 4:31
14. "Woman from Tokyo" (Single edit) – 2:43
15. "Might Just Take Your Life" (Single edit) (Blackmore, Lord, Paice, David Coverdale) – 3:32
16. "Burn" (Single edit) (Blackmore, David Coverdale, Glenn Hughes, Lord, Paice) – 4:08
17. "Stormbringer" (Blackmore, Coverdale) – 4:28
18. "You Keep on Moving" (Single edit) (Coverdale, Hughes) – 4:26

== Charts ==
Chart (1994)	Peak position
French Albums (SNEP)	20
New Zealand Albums (RMNZ)	30
Norwegian Albums (VG-lista)	28

== Certifications ==
Region	Certification	Certified units/sales
France (SNEP)	2× Gold	200,000^{*}
^{*} Sales figures based on certification alone.
