= Thomas Blug =

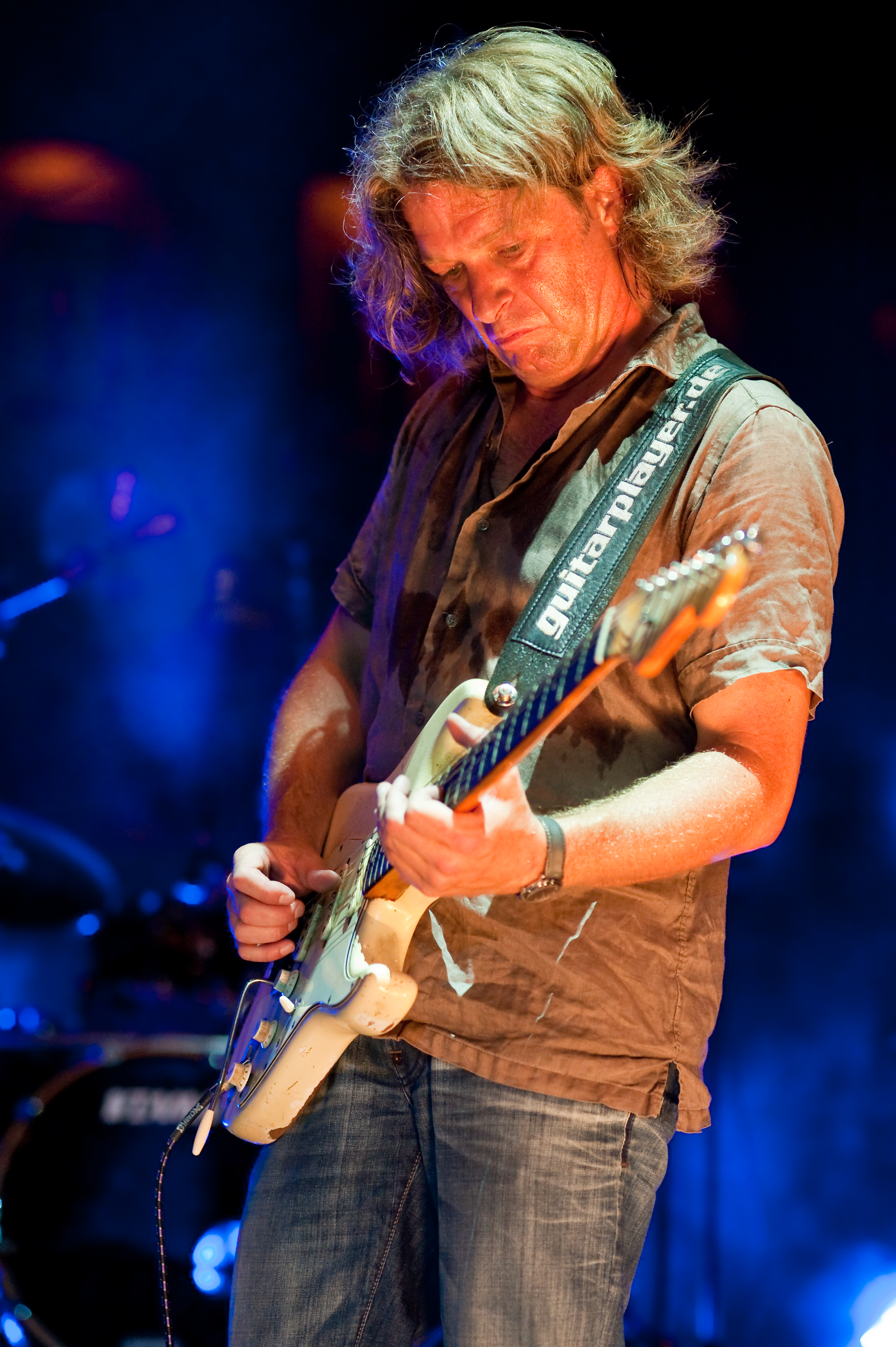
- Thomas Blug at a concert in Saarbrücken, Germany in 2009.

Background information
- Born: 1966 (age 59–60); Saarbrücken, West Germany
- Genres: Rock
- Occupations: Singer, songwriter, musician
- Instruments: Vocals, guitar
- Years active: 1996 – present

Thomas Blug, born in Saarbrücken in 1966, is a German musician, guitarist, musical electronic engineer and composer. He also formed his own band Thomas Blug Band with whom he released three albums besides his solo albums. He has also worked with band Dreist with whom he released an album in 1997 and a live album a decade later.

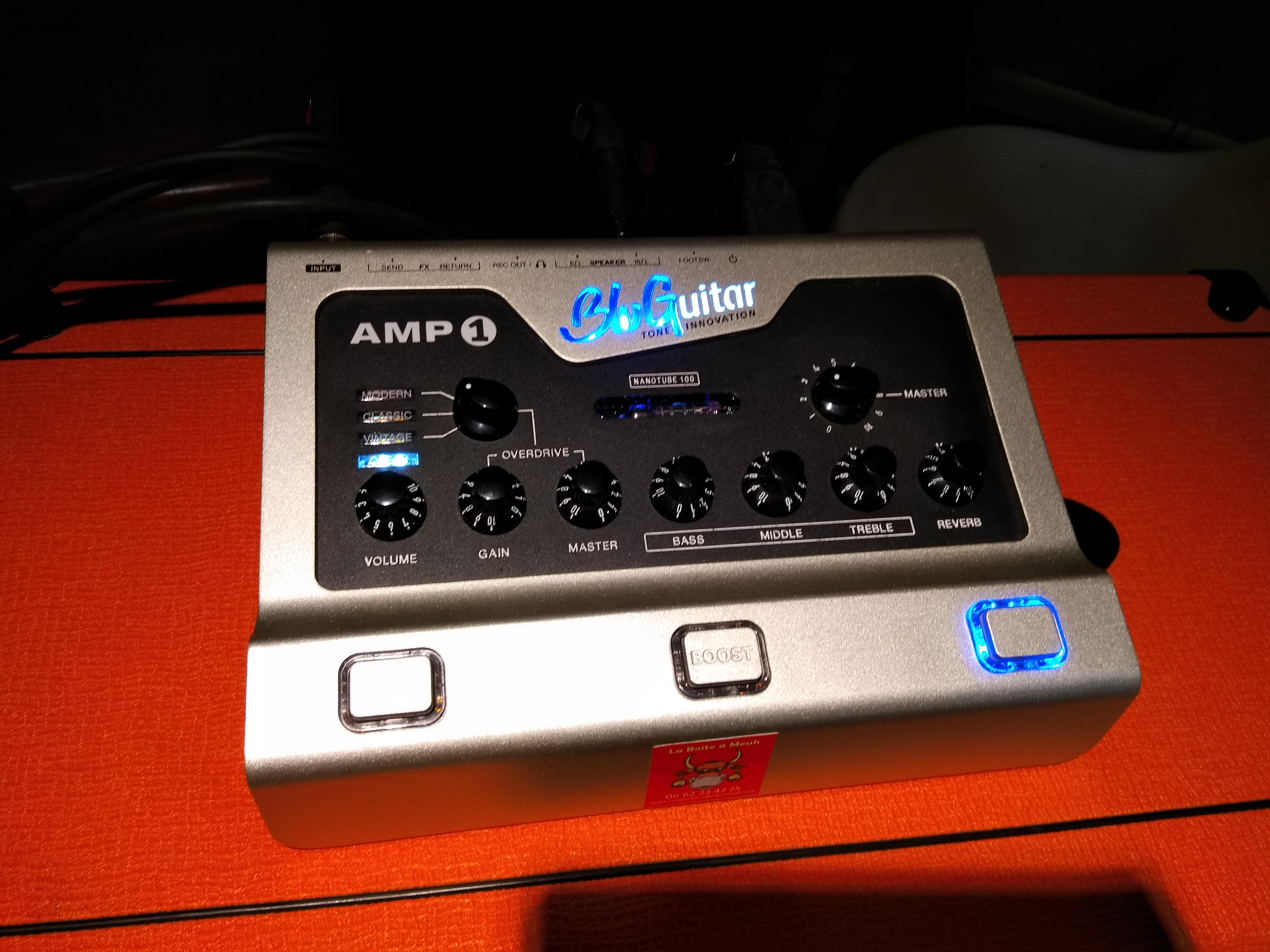
The Bluguitar Amp1, a compact tube amp head designed by Thomas Blug.

After being a product designer for Hughes & Kettner for 27 years, he launched his own company, Bluguitar, in 2014 which produces guitars, amplifiers, cabs and effects units.

== Discography ==
=== Albums ===
Solo

- 1996: The Beauty of Simplicity
- 1998: Electric Gallery
- 2002: 21st Century Guitar
- 2011: Blug plays Hendrix (Live album)
- 2012: Thomas Blug – Best of (Compilation album CD)

with Thomas Blug Band

- 2005: Guitar from the Hear (Live album + DVD)
- 2005: Guitar from the Heart – Live in Raalte, NL (Live album)
- 2009: Soul & Pepper

with band Dreist

- 1997: Weiber
- 2007: Neue Zeit (Live album)

=== Singles ===
Year	Single	Peak positions	Certification	Album
Year	Single	AUT	Certification	Album
2013	"Victim of Love" (Leonard Pospichal and Thomas Blug)	2		
2016	"Lost & Found" (Leonard Pospichal and Thomas Blug)	74		

== Awards ==
- 1997 "Best German Rock and Pop Guitarist"
- 2004 "Fender Strat(r) King of Europe"
