= Knocking at Your Back Door =

Single by Deep Purple

from the album Perfect Strangers
- B-side: "Wasted Sunsets" (US) "Perfect Strangers" (UK)
- Released: December 1984 (US); 7 June 1985 (UK)
- Recorded: July–August 1984
- Genre: Hard rock
- Length: 7:05
- Label: Polydor (UK); Mercury Records (US)
- Songwriters: Ritchie Blackmore; Ian Gillan; Roger Glover
- Producers: Roger Glover; Deep Purple

Deep Purple singles chronology
"Perfect Strangers" (1984)	"Knocking at Your Back Door" (1984)	"Call of the Wild" (1987)

"Knocking at Your Back Door" is a song by English hard rock band Deep Purple, the first track on the album Perfect Strangers, released in October 1984. The song was written by Ritchie Blackmore, Ian Gillan and Roger Glover. The track received heavy airplay at the time and was used by the Seattle SuperSonics in their lineup intro during home games.

== Background ==
The song is lyrically about anal sex, as it uses various sexual innuendos throughout the song. Ian Gillan commented:

There's this guy named Redbeard, from a radio station down in Texas. He phoned me up after it had been played on every radio station in America and said, "Is this what I think it's about?" And I said, "Yeah." And he said, "It's amazing, every radio station in America is playing a song written about anal sex and they don't even realize what's going on." And I was like, well it's not in-your-face anal sex, it's just a joke. It just came about with the lyrics. It's no big deal. But it's a humorous thing and not meant to be offensive. And I think it was just an afterthought. It certainly wasn't what inspired the song.

After receiving considerable airplay, the song was released commercially in the United States in December 1984, while in the UK, it was released as the second single from the Perfect Strangers album in June 1985.

"Knocking at Your Back Door" was a permanent part of the band's live set until 1994 and sporadically since then. Live albums that include the track are: Nobody's Perfect (1988), In the Absence of Pink (1991), Come Hell or High Water (DVD, 1994), Live in Europe 1993 (2007), and Live at Montreux 2011 (2011)

== Charts ==
Year	Nation	Chart	Position
1985	US	Top Rock Tracks	7
1985	US	Billboard Hot 100	61
1985	UK	Official Singles chart	68
