= Perfect Strangers (Deep Purple album) =

Studio album by Deep Purple
- Released: 29 October 1984
- Recorded: 10 July – 26 August 1984
- Studios: "Horizons" in Stowe, Vermont, USA with Le Mobile Studio
- Genres: Hard rock; heavy metal
- Length: 40:02
- Label: Polydor
- Producers: Roger Glover, Deep Purple

Deep Purple chronology
Come Taste the Band (1975)	Perfect Strangers (1984)	The House of Blue Light (1987)

Singles from Perfect Strangers
- 1. "Nobody's Home" Released: October 1984; 2. "Knocking at Your Back Door" Released: December 1984 (US); 3. "Perfect Strangers" Released: January 1985 (UK)

Perfect Strangers is the eleventh studio album by English rock band Deep Purple, released on 29 October 1984. It was the most successful album recorded by the re-formed 'Mark II' line-up.

== Background ==
It was the first Deep Purple studio album in nine years. Perfect Strangers is also the first album with the Mk II line-up in eleven years, the last being Who Do We Think We Are (1973). Its nine-year gap from Come Taste the Band (1975) marks the longest between two studio albums from the band to date. Ritchie Blackmore and Roger Glover arrived from Rainbow, Ian Gillan from Black Sabbath, Jon Lord from Whitesnake, and Ian Paice from Gary Moore's backing band. Just two songs in the reformed Deep Purple’s new repertoire, "Nobody’s Home" and "Not Responsible", would be credited to all five band members. Gillan and Glover attempted to return matters to the all-for-one composition credits of the Mk II lineup's 1970–73 recordings, but Blackmore held firm. It was not until Blackmore permanently left the group in 1993 that the issue was finally resolved.

The CD and cassette versions of the album contained the extra track "Not Responsible" (which contains the lyric "I've got no ticket, but I'm gonna take a fucking ride", making it one of the few Deep Purple tracks to feature profanity). The album was remastered and reissued on 22 June 1999 with the bonus instrumental track "Son of Alerik". The latter had previously been available as a B-side on the single "Perfect Strangers" in 1984.

The album was a commercial success, reaching #5 in the UK charts and #17 on the Billboard 200 in the US. Perfect Strangers was only the second Deep Purple studio album to be certified platinum in the United States, following Machine Head (1972). The tour was so successful that the band had to book many additional dates to the U.S. arena tour, as tickets sold out very quickly. Their U.S. tour in 1985 out-grossed every artist that year except Bruce Springsteen.

== Reception ==
Professional ratings
Review scores
Source	Rating
AllMusic	3/5 stars
Collector's Guide to Heavy Metal	10/10
Rock Hard	9.0/10
Rolling Stone	2/5 stars

The album received mixed reviews. Deborah Frost of Rolling Stone in a contemporary review remarked that, with the exception of the two singles, "The material consists of hastily knocked-off jams" and wondered if the release was just made "to cash in on the current heavy-metal craze." But she also stated, "Blackmore's Strat has such a great roar that you're willing to just let it reverberate in your eardrums for a bit. And it's nice to hear Jon Lord's unsynthesized organ squalls, Ian Paice's electrifying drumming, Ian Gillan's howls and whispers and Roger Glover's solid bass lines once again," although, "Instead of Glover, an outside producer might have forced the band to tighten up its licks and arrangements."

Canadian journalist Martin Popoff praised this comeback album which "only nods to the '70s" and concentrates "on songcraft rather than technical display," placing Deep Purple as "a reference point of a genre in metal without categorization."

"A great moment in time," suggested Glover, "but, as an album, it doesn't quite hang together." The rest of the band all maintained positive feelings towards the album in subsequent years.

== Track listing ==
All songs by Ritchie Blackmore, Roger Glover and Ian Gillan except where noted.

"Son of Alerik" had appeared in an edited form on the 7" B-side of the "Perfect Strangers" single, or in full on the 12" "Perfect Strangers" single and the European version of the compilation Knocking at Your Back Door: The Best of Deep Purple in the 80's.

Side one
No.	Title	Length
1.	"Knocking at Your Back Door"	7:09
2.	"Under the Gun"	4:40
3.	"Nobody's Home" (Blackmore, Gillan, Glover, Jon Lord, Ian Paice)	4:01
4.	"Mean Streak"	4:26

Side two
No.	Title	Length
5.	"Perfect Strangers"	5:31
6.	"A Gypsy's Kiss"	4:14
7.	"Wasted Sunsets"	3:58
8.	"Hungry Daze"	5:01

Cassette and CD release extra track
No.	Title	Length
9.	"Not Responsible" (Blackmore, Gillan, Glover, Lord, Paice)	4:53

1999 CD bonus track
No.	Title	Length
10.	"Son of Alerik" (Blackmore)	10:01

== Personnel ==
Deep Purple

- Ian Gillan – vocals
- Ritchie Blackmore – guitars
- Jon Lord – organ, keyboards
- Roger Glover – bass guitar, synthesizer
- Ian Paice – drums

Production

- Produced by Roger Glover and Deep Purple
- Recorded at "Horizons", Stowe, Vermont with Le Mobile Studio, 1984
- Mixed at Tennessee Tonstudio, Hamburg, Germany
- Engineered by Nick Blagona
- Mastered by Greg Calbi at Sterling Sound, New York

== Charts ==
=== Weekly charts ===
Chart (1984–1985)	Peak position
Australian Albums (Kent Music Report)	19
Austrian Albums (Ö3 Austria)	5
Canada Top Albums/CDs (RPM)	22
Dutch Albums (Album Top 100)	16
Finnish Albums (The Official Finnish Charts)	7
French Albums (SNEP)	5
German Albums (Offizielle Top 100)	2
Italian Albums (Musica e Dischi)	9
Japanese Albums (Oricon)	4
New Zealand Albums (RMNZ)	12
Norwegian Albums (VG-lista)	2
Swedish Albums (Sverigetopplistan)	3
Swiss Albums (Schweizer Hitparade)	1
UK Albums (Official Charts)	5
US Billboard 200	17

=== Year-end charts ===
Chart (1985)	Peak position
Canada Top Albums/CDs (RPM)	91

== Certifications and sales ==
Region	Certification	Certified units/sales
Australia (ARIA)	Gold	35,000^{^}
Canada (Music Canada)	Platinum	100,000^{^}
Germany (BVMI)	Gold	250,000^{^}
New Zealand (RMNZ)	Gold	7,500^{^}
Switzerland (IFPI Switzerland)	Gold	25,000^{^}
United Kingdom (BPI)	Gold	100,000^{^}
United States (RIAA)	Platinum	1,000,000^{^}
Summaries
Worldwide	—	3,000,000
^{^} Shipments figures based on certification alone.

== Accolades ==
Publication	Country	Accolade	Year	Rank
Kerrang!	United Kingdom	"End of Year Lists – Top Album of 1984"	1984	7
