= Le Mobile =

Mobile recording studio

Le Mobile is a remote recording truck, a rolling recording studio based in Carlsbad, California since 1984. Owned and operated by Guy Charbonneau, it has been established since 1973 and has its origins in Montreal, Quebec, Canada. In Cleveland, Ohio, Charbonneau recorded the soundtrack for One Trick Pony with Paul Simon in 1980, which was his first of many projects in the United States. Le Mobile has won numerous awards in the recording industry including an Emmy at the 52nd Annual Creative Arts Emmy Awards for Guy Charbonneau. Over the years, Charbonneau has recorded a wide variety of musical artists. Some of the major solo artists recorded by Le Mobile include: Gwen Stefani, Faith Hill, Eric Clapton, Christina Aguilera, Peter Gabriel, Andrea Bocelli, Kenny Chesney, Roger Waters, Sting, Herbie Hancock, Joe Jackson and Van Morrison. Throughout the long course of this mobile recording facility's colorful history, Le Mobile has been involved in the original audio tracking, mixing, and post production of a wide variety of projects in both the music and television industries. Le Mobile has recorded for vinyl album, CD, and DVD 5.1 surround for projects such as internet or television music specials, motion picture and theatrical music scoring and soundtracks, as well as live concert performances such as the annual Coachella Valley Music and Arts Festival.

Among the studio equipment used is a Neve 8058 vintage analog mixing console and 7.4 Pro Tools HD3 Software with Apogee converters.

Other gear that Le Mobile uses are Millennia microphone pre-amplifiers, as well as fully custom C Gray equalizers. Le Mobile also owns and operates the first two Studer A800 24-track analog recording machines ever sold in the U.S. These machines were recently used in Vancouver, BC and Calgary, AB to record music for the Roger Waters The Dark Side of the Moon Live DVD release.
