= Perfect Strangers (Deep Purple song) =

Single by Deep Purple

from the album Perfect Strangers
- B-side: "Son of Alerik"
- Released: 18 January 1985
- Recorded: July–August 1984
- Genre: Hard rock
- Length: 5:23
- Label: Polydor (UK)
- Songwriters: Ritchie Blackmore; Ian Gillan; Roger Glover
- Producers: Roger Glover; Deep Purple

Deep Purple singles chronology
"Knocking at Your Back Door" (1984)	"Perfect Strangers" (1985)	"Knocking at Your Back Door/Perfect Strangers" (1985)

Music video
- "Perfect Strangers" on YouTube

"Perfect Strangers" is a song by British rock band Deep Purple. It is the title track of their 1984 comeback album Perfect Strangers. It was also released as the first single from the album in the UK.

It is one of the few Deep Purple compositions not to feature a guitar solo. Nevertheless, founding band member and guitarist Ritchie Blackmore has called it his favorite Deep Purple song. The lyrics are inspired by the Elric books by Michael Moorcock.

As a single, it spent three weeks in the UK Singles charts from 26 January to 9 February 1985, peaking at No. 48, a modest performance as compared to the album as a whole, which had peaked at No. 5 of the UK Album charts throughout November and December the previous year.

== Covers ==
- Dimmu Borgir on their album Abrahadabra as a bonus track.
- Progressive metal band Dream Theater on their EP A Change of Seasons. Dream Theater also performed it live on a BBC Radio show with Iron Maiden vocalist Bruce Dickinson singing the lead vocals. The band also performed it under the pseudonym Nightmare Cinema at interludes during their concerts when they would switch instruments.
- Hard rock vocalist Jørn Lande on his solo album Unlocking the Past.
- Finnish duo Timo Kotipelto and Jani Liimatainen during live performances and on their studio album Blackoustic.
- American doom metal band Yob covered Perfect Strangers as a standalone single.
- 1980s glam metal band Vixen (band) performed the song as an interpolation between their song Rock Me included in their live album Live Fire (2018), a recording of their live performance in Chicago in 2017.

== Personnel ==
- Ritchie Blackmore – guitars
- Ian Gillan – vocals
- Roger Glover – bass
- Jon Lord – organ
- Ian Paice – drums
