= Ian Paice =

English rock drummer (born 1948)

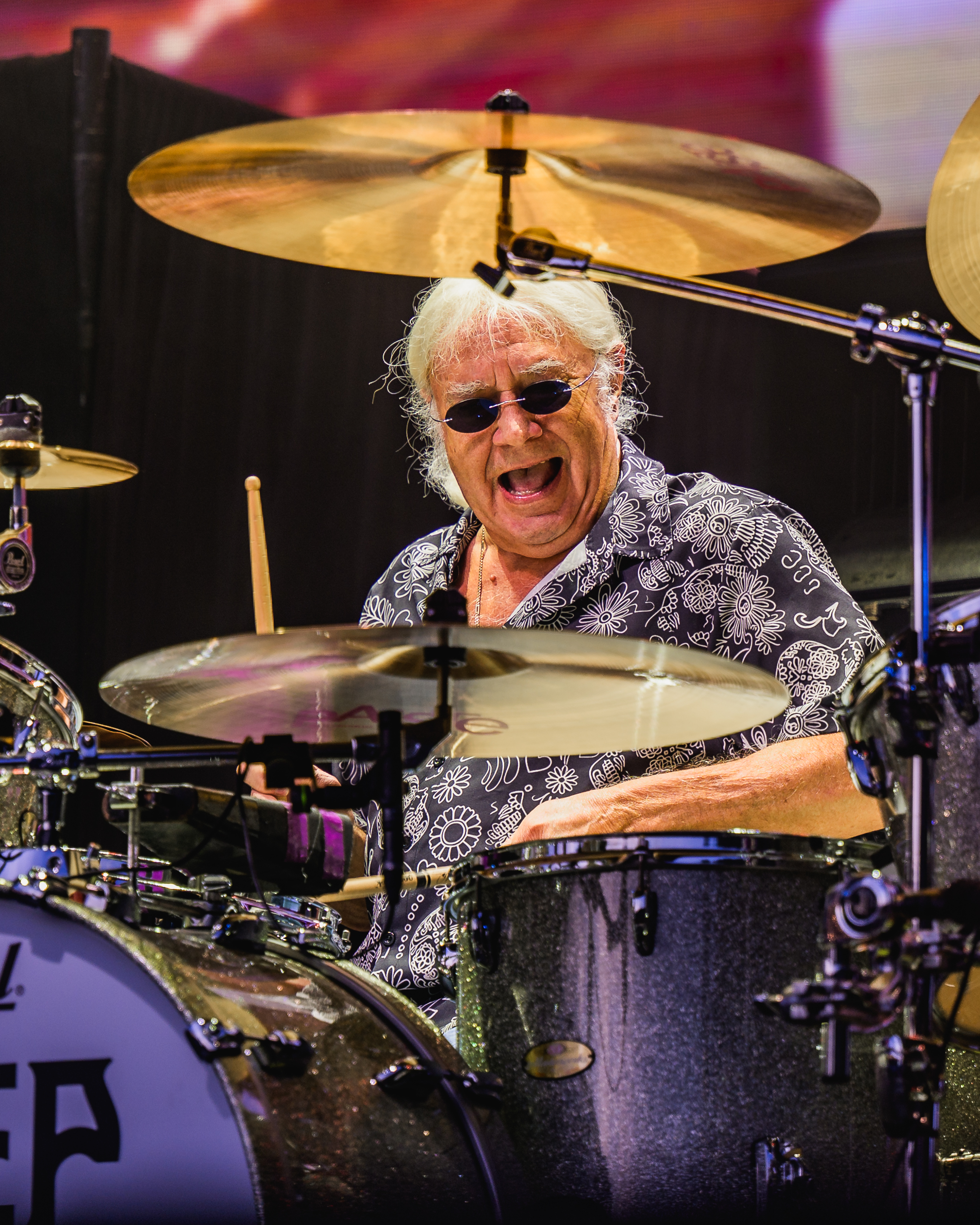
- Paice performing with Deep Purple in 2026

Background information
- Born: Ian Anderson Paice; 29 June 1948 (age 78); Nottingham, England
- Genres: Hard rock; heavy metal; blues rock; progressive rock
- Occupations: Drummer
- Years active: Early 1960s–present
- Member of: Deep Purple
- Formerly of: Green Bullfrog; Paice Ashton Lord; Whitesnake

Ian Anderson Paice (born 29 June 1948) is an English musician who is the drummer and an original member of the rock band Deep Purple. He remains the only member of Deep Purple who has served in every line-up since the band's inception in 1968, as well as having played on every album and at every live appearance. He is considered one of the greatest rock drummers of all time, and was inducted into the Rock and Roll Hall of Fame as a member of Deep Purple in 2016.

Deep Purple were broken up for eight years from 1976 to 1984, during which time Paice was a member of two bands that also involved other Deep Purple members, Paice Ashton Lord (also featuring Jon Lord) during 1976–1978, and Whitesnake (also featuring Jon Lord and David Coverdale) during 1979–1982. He was then Gary Moore's drummer from 1982 until Deep Purple's reformation in 1984. He has also played drums as a touring and/or session musician for other artists, including the Velvet Underground, George Harrison, and Paul McCartney.

== Biography ==
=== The early years ===
born 29 June 1948 in Nottingham, spent his early years (aged 3 to 6) in Germany because his father was a civil servant, before moving back to Bicester, Oxfordshire for the rest of his childhood. He got his first drum kit at age 15, and began his professional career in the early 1960s aged 17, playing drums in his father's dance band. The first band he was in was called Georgie & the Rave-Ons, which after being renamed the Shindigs released their first single featuring the 17-year-old Paice and George Adams.

In 1966, aged 18, Paice joined the MI5, which soon changed its name to the Maze. He moved from Bicester, to the Slough/ Windsor, area of Berkshire, to be closer to where they performed. Primarily a club band, the Maze produced a number of singles, recorded mainly in Italy and France.

=== Deep Purple ===
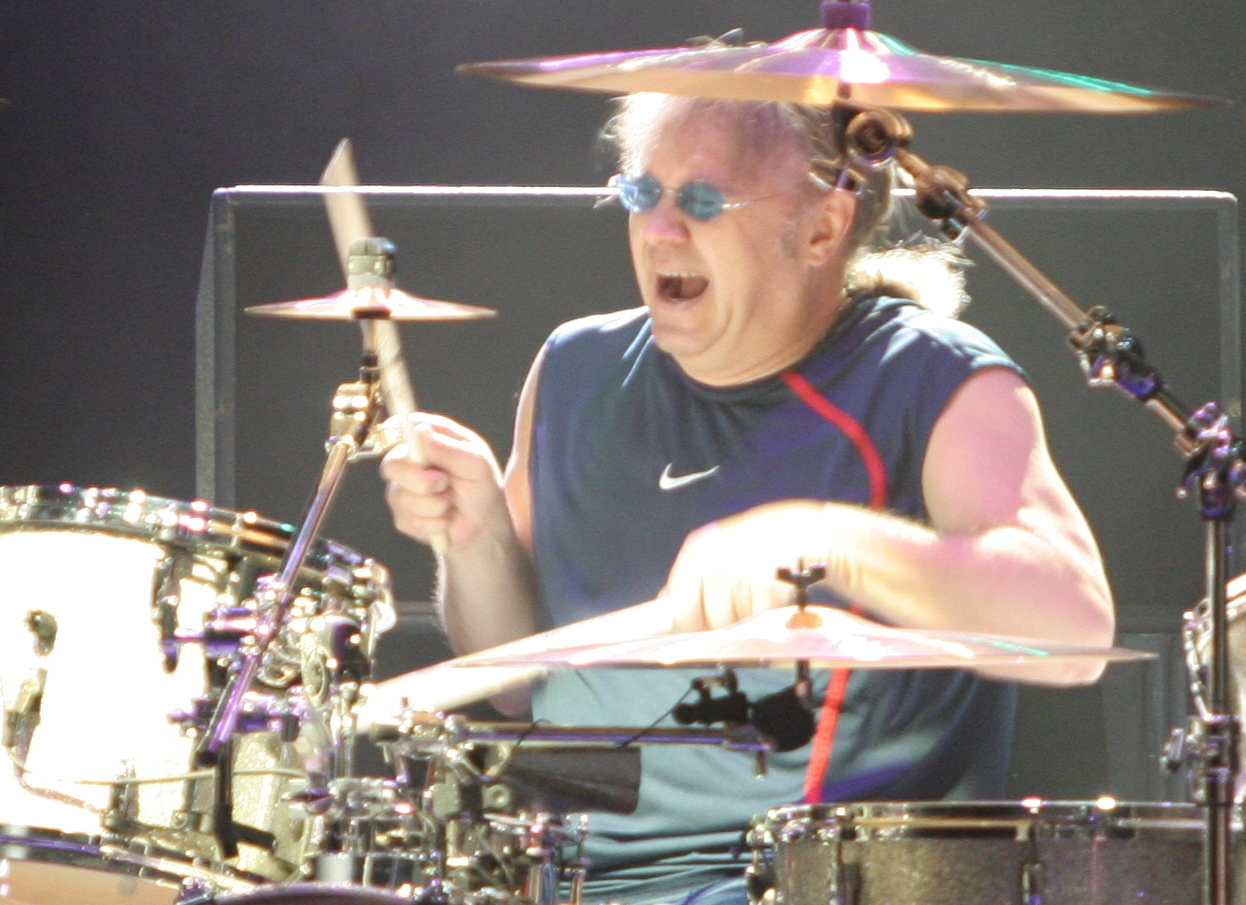
Paice with Deep Purple at the Labatt Centre in London, Ontario, Canada (2005)

The Maze featured vocalist Rod Evans, who alongside Paice was to form the original line-up of Deep Purple in March 1968. Evans had responded to an ad for a lead singer published by Deep Purple management, and showed up for his audition with Ian Paice in tow. Given that Deep Purple's first choice as drummer, Bobby Woodman, had expressed dislike for the band's musical direction, the group hastily arranged an audition for Paice, with guitarist Ritchie Blackmore leading the charge. Blackmore in interviews years later stated: "I had looked for Ian Paice for about a year after seeing him perform in Hamburg. He's an incredible drummer. And he was the motor of the band". Paice is the last remaining original Deep Purple member in the band in the present day.

=== Whitesnake ===
Deep Purple split up in 1976 and eventually reformed in 1984. During the split, Paice formed a new group, Paice Ashton Lord in 1976. The band, also comprising singer/pianist Tony Ashton, Deep Purple organist Jon Lord, guitarist/vocalist Bernie Marsden and bassist Paul Martinez, recorded one album (Malice in Wonderland) and played only five live shows. Paice Ashton Lord were put on hold in 1977, halfway through recording the group's second album. They subsequently broke up, allegedly because Tony Ashton only felt at home playing live shows in little clubs.

In August 1979, Paice was asked by David Coverdale to join Whitesnake on the Japanese tour for the Lovehunter album. He stayed with the band for almost three years. He appeared on the Whitesnake albums Ready an' Willing (1980), Live...in the Heart of the City (1980), Come an' Get It (1981) and Saints & Sinners (1982).

This incarnation of Whitesnake featured David Coverdale and Jon Lord, which meant three members of the Mark III and IV line-ups of Deep Purple were in Whitesnake during this period. Following musical differences with David Coverdale, Paice left Whitesnake in January 1982.

=== Gary Moore Band ===
In 1982, Paice joined Gary Moore for an album that turned into Corridors of Power. Moore's manager subsequently came up with the idea of Moore and Paice putting a band together under Moore's name, so that his management would take the business side of the project with Paice having a sizeable interest in the band. The collaboration turned out to be a successful one and produced a couple of albums and extensive tours. Paice left Moore's band in April 1984 when the reformed Deep Purple reconvened, and he remains in Deep Purple to the present day.

=== Notable collaborations ===
Paice played drums on the Velvet Underground's final album Squeeze, which was released in 1973. At that point, the band only consisted of singer and multi-instrumentalist Doug Yule (all of the other members, including Lou Reed, had either left or been fired by their manager), and the album was poorly received and quickly fell into obscurity.

In 1973, Paice was among English rock musicians invited by Eddie Harris, an American jazz player, to take part in the saxophonist's London sessions at Morgan Studios. Paice played on two songs: "He's Island Man" and "I've Tried Everything" along with Jeff Beck, Steve Winwood and Rick Grech. The album, called E.H. in the U.K. – The Eddie Harris London Sessions, produced by Geoffrey Haslam, was released the next year thru Atlantic Records.

In 1983, Paice took part in one of the first tribute recordings by symphonic orchestra paid to a rock band. Arrested – The Music of Police was a joint venture by the Royal Philharmonic Orchestra conducted by Don Airey and assembled rock musicians (other artists involved included Neil Murray, Graham Bonnet, Chris Thompson, Gary Moore, Roy Wood, Keth Airey and Raff Ravenscroft). The sessions took place mainly in London, primarily at Abbey Road Studios, but also in Los Angeles.

In July 1989, Paice took part in George Harrison's recording session at Friar Park, which resulted in three songs "Cheer Down", "Cockamamie Business" and "Poor Little Girl", which also featured Jeff Lynne, Jim Horn and Richard Tandy among others. The songs were recorded for the compilation album Best of Dark Horse 1976-1989, released in October the same year. The purpose of this album was to close Harrison's contractual obligations to Warner Brothers. "Cheer Down" was also released on the Lethal Weapon 2 (1989) soundtrack album.

In March 1999, Paice joined Paul McCartney at Abbey Road Studios for the recording of Run Devil Run, released in October that year. The line-up also featured Pink Floyd's David Gilmour and The Pirates' Mick Green. Paice also joined the album's line-up at three one-off performances in September and December 1999, including a show at the famous Cavern Club. Steve Morse said of Paice: "He's like a real heavy Ringo. He's just so good on the drums, but doesn't want to make a big deal about it."

In 2001, Paice guested on Jim Capaldi's album Living on the Outside. He played on a 1960s-style rock-and-roll song, "Anna Julia", and the guitar-driven "We're Not Alone". "Anna Julia", which was also released as a single and turned out a considerable hit, also features George Harrison and Paul Weller.

Paice has worked on numerous occasions with former Spencer Davis Group drummer, Pete York. In December 2001 the two played a low key club tour of Germany, playing two drums on one stage, supported by Colin Hodgkinson (bass) and Miller Anderson (guitar, vocals). Apart from the regular setlist consisting of songs from York's and Paice's back catalogue, the shows featured impromptu drumming demonstrations and Q&A sessions.

Paice often joins Italian guitarist Tolo Marton, with whom he has performed on many occasions over the last decade, on stage. Marton's live album Dal Vero features Paice on the Jimi Hendrix songs "Stone Free" and "Hey Joe". Since 2005, he has also been involved in Moonstone Project led by Italian guitarist Matteo Filippini. The band performs regularly, mainly in Italy; they have also released two studio albums on which Paice has guested. Time to Take a Stand, released in 2006, featured two songs featuring both Paice and Glenn Hughes, performing together for the first time since 1976.

The list of Paice's declared admirers includes Red Hot Chili Peppers' Chad Smith. On 21 June 2004 Smith and Paice joined forces at the launch of the London Drum Company. The next year they also played together at the Modern Drummer Festival at New Jersey Performing Arts Center. Both performances were released on DVD.

In mid-2011, Paice took part in the all-star recording of William Shatner's Seeking Major Tom, the actor's fourth album, a collection of space-themed cover songs. Paice plays on a rendition of Deep Purple's "Space Truckin'" alongside Johnny Winter. The album also features former Deep Purple guitarist Ritchie Blackmore.

=== Special performances/charity activities ===
On 19 June 1992, Paice was among guest musicians performing at the Leukaemia Research charity concert in Oxford. The concert featured members of Bad Company and Procol Harum as well as Gary Moore and Tony Ashton.

On 20 October 1992 in New York, Paice played at the John Bonham Tribute alongside Jason Bonham, Tommy Aldridge, Denny Carmassi, and Frankie Banali among others. Paice performed "The Rover" from the Led Zeppelin album Physical Graffiti.

Paice joined Tony Ashton at two performances at the Hell Blues Festival on 10 and 11 September 1999 in Norway. The band also featured Paul Martinez on bass, who had played alongside Ashton and Paice in Paice Ashton Lord in 1976/1977. The group was, however, billed as Tony Ashton & Legendary Friends.

Paice entertained more than 1000 people at a special charity concert in Reading on 13 January 2006. This highly successful event, which raised over £7000, was organised by Chris Wright, MD of DrumWright. The show was organised in aid of Tong-Len, which supports primary education for highly deprived children in Northern India.

On 31 March and 1 April 2006, Paice joined Don Airey, Thomas Blug and Thijs van Leer at impromptu performances held during the ProLight+Sound fair in Frankfurt, Germany. The show included songs from the highly acclaimed Billy Cobham album Spectrum as well as songs by Deep Purple and Focus.

Since 2006, Paice has also been involved in The Sunflower Jam, a London-based charity founded by his wife Jacky Paice and also involving actor Jeremy Irons. Paice is usually featured as a member of the SunflowerJam house band. He has performed there with likes of Robert Plant, Brian May, John Paul Jones, Gary Moore and Bruce Dickinson.

On 2 March 2007, Paice held a drum clinic organised by the University of Glamorgan. The show was organised in partnership with ATRiuM the university's Cardiff School of Creative & Cultural Industries. Commenting after the show Paice said: "ATRiuM will be a great place for young musicians to learn their craft, not to mention all the other things they’ve got going on there. This drum clinic of mine will hopefully demonstrate that drummers are also musicians, despite the jokes!".

On 13 January 2008, Paice took part in the ChildLine Rocks charity concert in London, where he played live with former Deep Purple bassist Glenn Hughes for the first time since 1976.

On 24 May 2008, Paice participated in "Rock Legends Adventure" concert in Cologne, Germany. He joined an all-stars line-up featuring Pete York, Leland Sklar, Steve Lukather, Bobby Kimball and John Miles among others. Paice played on 10 of 32 songs performed that night, including The Kinks' "You Really Got Me", The Beatles' "I Saw Her Standing There" and "Come Together", Allman Brothers Band's "One Way Out", Steve Wonder's "Superstition" and Deep Purple's "Smoke on the Water".

Paice appeared at the Pearl Day (Pearl drums event) which was held on 1 June 2008 at the East Midlands Conference Centre in Nottingham, UK. Apart from Paice, guests included Jerry Brown, Mark Brzezecki, Jimmy Degrasso, Darrin Mooney, and Dan Foord.

On 6 September 2009, Paice joined Neil Murray, Doogie White, Jonathan Noyce, Clive Bunker and Phil Hilborne at a "Night with Jethro Tull and Deep Purple" concert in Turin, Italy.

On 18 April 2010, Paice, Jon Lord and Iron Maiden frontman Bruce Dickinson joined leading actors (Gillian Anderson, Julie Christie, Sinéad Cusack, Emilia Fox, Derek Jacobi, Zoe Wanamaker, James Wilby, among others) to support Survival International at the Apollo Theatre in London for fundraising event "We are One – a celebration of tribal peoples", created by actor Mark Rylance.

On 2 April 2012, Paice performed at the Buddy Rich 25th Anniversary Memorial Concert at the London Palladium. He was joined on stage by the Buddy Rich Orchestra and Bruce Dickinson.

On 16 September 2012, Paice appeared at the Sunflower Jam charity concert at the Royal Albert Hall, performing alongside guitarist Brian May of Queen, bassist John Paul Jones of Led Zeppelin, and vocalists Bruce Dickinson and Alice Cooper.

== Personal life ==
Paice is married and has three children: James, Emmy and Calli. His wife, Jacky, is the twin sister of the late Jon Lord's wife, Vicky.

It had been rumored (and even mentioned by former Gillan guitarist Bernie Torme in an interview) that Paice has only one lung: in reality, he is only missing a portion of the lower lobe in his left lung, due to contracting a case of pneumonia when he was six years old that turned into tuberculosis.

He is almost always seen wearing glasses with blue (or occasionally green or purple)-tinted spectacle lenses.

Paice is a supporter of England rugby; his son James played.

=== Health ===
On 14 June 2016, he suffered a transient ischaemic attack, or mini stroke. This led to Deep Purple cancelling two concerts planned in Sweden that week. He said after the incident that there was "no serious or permanent damage" and expected to return to performing in July. He added that the cancelled concerts were the first Deep Purple performances of which he had forced the cancellation since his co-founding of the band in 1968. He returned to stage with Deep Purple in Gothenburg on 1 July, playing a full setlist with the band, but without performing his drum solo.

== Equipment ==
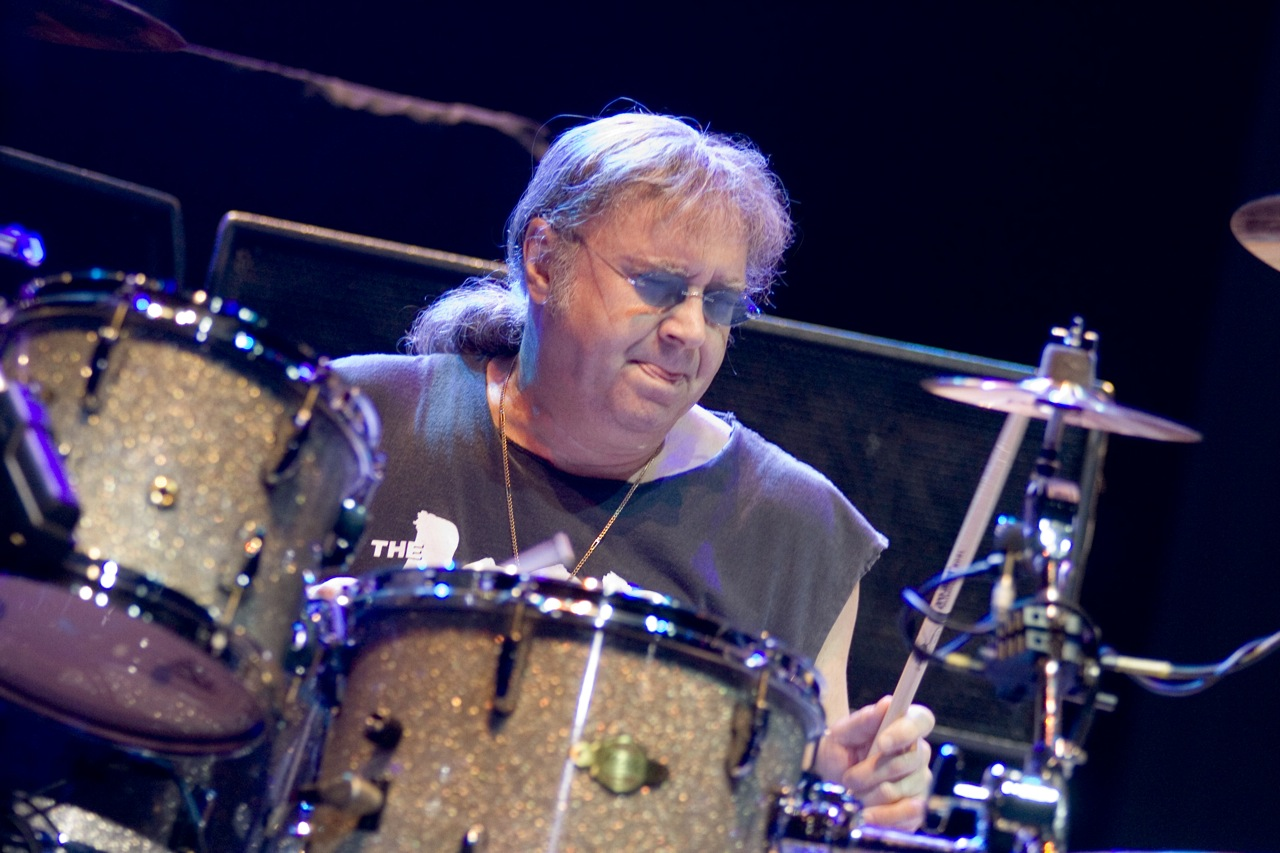
Paice with Deep Purple in 2009

Today Paice uses Pearl drumkits as his main performing drums, incorporating Paiste cymbals, Remo drumheads and Pro-Mark drumsticks. He used Ludwig kits during the seventies and early eighties in remarkable large sizes: 26" Bass drum, 16" Tom, an 18 & 20" floor tom and 14 x 6.5" Supraphonic snare which was a blueprint for his signature snare from Pearl. In 1982 he switched companies, because Ludwig's development stalled and he got a better deal from Pearl. He also prefers a single bass drum set-up, both live and in the studio. Pearl Drums produce his signature snare drum.

He has also released a solo DVD which is aimed at both drummers and music fans in general.

== Influences and style ==
Paice's early influences include jazz and rock drummers such as Gene Krupa, Buddy Rich, Bobby Elliott, Ringo Starr and Charles Connor, and later he was inspired by Carmine Appice, Ginger Baker and Mitch Mitchell.

He is primarily left-handed with a left-handed drum-kit set-up and uses the matched-grip approach. He is well known for his extremely fast and smooth single and double-stroke rolls as well as single bass pedal speed. He did however perform once with a double-bass setup on the title track of the Fireball album and occasionally performed it live. He is also known for perfecting the one-handed roll as demonstrated on a Drummerworld video.

Paice has been cited as an influence on many notable rock drummers, including Clive Burr, Mikkey Dee, Virgil Donati, Dave Grohl, Gary James, Simon Phillips and Matt Starr.

== Recognition ==
On 5 November 2007 at the Classic Rock Awards, Jacky and Ian Paice received the ChildLine award in recognition of their philanthropic work with the SunflowerJam raising money for children with cancer. Bruce Dickinson of Iron Maiden presented them with the award. It was the first time the award had been given.

On 2 April 2012, Paice was presented with a Lifetime Achievement Award at the Buddy Rich 25th Anniversary Memorial Concert at the London Palladium.

He was inducted into the Modern Drummer Hall of Fame in 2015. In 2016, Paice was ranked 21st in Rolling Stone's list of the "100 Greatest Drummers of All Time".

As a member of Deep Purple, he was inducted into the Rock and Roll Hall of Fame on 8 April 2016.

In April 2026, Paice was hosted along with other members of Deep Purple by Japanese Prime Minister Sanae Takaichi, who presented him with a set of Tama drumsticks that she had signed.

== Discography ==
MI5 & The Maze

- 1966 You'll Never Stop Me Loving You/Only Time Will Tell (SP, UK)
- 1966 Hello Stranger/Telephone (SP, UK)
- 1967 Aria Del Sud/Non Fatemio Odiare (SP, Italy)
- 1967 Harlem Shuffle/What Now/The Trap/I'm So Glad (EP, France)
- 1967 Catari, Catari/Easy Street (SP, UK)

Gary Moore Band

- 1982 Corridors of Power
- 1983 Falling in Love with You (EP)
- 1983 Rockin' Every Night - Live in Japan (European release: 1986)
- 1983 Victims of the Future
- 1984 We Want Moore!

Solo

- 2002 Not for the Pro's (DVD+CD)
- 2005 Chad Smith & Ian Paice – Live Performances, Interviews, Tech Talk and Soundcheck (DVD)
- 2006 Modern Drummer Festival 2005 (DVD)
- 2007 Ian Paice and Friends Live in Reading 2006 (DVD)
- 2007 Ian Paice and Lee Joe Band — Live In Belgorod 2007, Interview (DVD)
- 2015 Ian Paice's Sunflower Superjam - Live at The Royal Albert Hall 2012
- 2016 Ian Paice The Legend - Rock Summit 2014 (DVD)

Film and TV appearances

- 1983 Rock School (BBC, educational)
- 1991 Deep Purple – Heavy Metal Pioneers (Warner, interviewee)
- 1995 Rock Family Trees, ep. 'Deep Purple' (BBC, interviewee)
- 2002 Classic Albums, ep. 'Deep Purple – Machine Head' (ITV, interviewee)
- 2004 Roger Glover – Made in Wales (ITV, interviewee)
- 2005 Hard Rock Treasures (Feature, interviewee)
- 2006 Heavy Metal: Louder Than Life (Feature, interviewee)
- 2007 Highway Star: A Journey in Rock (interviewee)
- 2010 I'm in a Rock n' Roll Band, ep. The Drummer (BBC, interviewee)
- 2011 Metal Evolution, eps. Pre-Metal, Early Metal, Part 2: UK Division (VH1, interviewee)
- 2013 Behind The Music Remastered, ep. 'Deep Purple' (VH1, interviewee)
- 2013 Jon Lord: It's All Music (BBC, interviewee)
- 2014 Made in Japan - The Rise of Deep Purple Mk II (interviewee)

Sessions & guest appearances

- 1967 Do Your Own Thing/Goodbye Baby Goodbye (Soul Brothers, SP)
- 1968 I Shall Be Released/Down In The Flood (Boz Burrell, SP)
- 1968 I Feel Fine/Let Me Love You (Tony Wilson, SP)
- 1968 Sundragon (Sundragon)
- 1971 Natural Magic (Green Bullfrog)
- 1971 In My Time (Mike Hurst)
- 1972 Gemini Suite (Jon Lord)
- 1972 ELF (ELF - as co-producer)
- 1972 Rolling With My Baby [Single] (Silverhead - as producer)
- 1972 Home is Where You Find It (Eddie Hardin)
- 1972 The Pete York Percussion Band (The Pete York Percussion Band)
- 1973 Squeeze (Velvet Underground)
- 1973 Bump & Grind (Jackson Heights)
- 1974 E.H. in the UK – (Eddie Harris)
- 1974 First of the Big Bands (Tony Ashton & Jon Lord)
- 1975 Funkist (Bobby Harrison)
- 1975 Get Off II (NAPRA)
- 1977 You Can't Teach An Old Dog New Tricks (Eddie Hardin)
- 1978 Composition (Kirby)
- 1980 And About Time Too (Bernie Marsden)
- 1980 Free Spirit (Ken Hensley, "Brown Eyed Boy")
- 1981 Look at Me Now (Bernie Marsden)
- 1982 Before I Forget (Jon Lord)
- 1983 Arrested – The Royal Philharmonic Orchestra & Friends Tribute to Police ("Truth Hits Everybody", "Arrested", "Message in a Bottle", "Invisible Sun")
- 1987 Super Drumming (Pete York & Friends)
- 1988 The Christmas Album (Keith Emerson, "Captain Starship Christmas")
- 1989 Best of Dark Horse 1976–89 (George Harrison)
- 1990 Jump The Gun (Pretty Maids)
- 1990 Pete York Presents Super Drumming Volume 3 (Pete York & Friends)
- 1993 BBC Radio 1 Live in Concert '74 (Tony Ashton & Jon Lord)
- 1994 From Time To Time (Ken Hensley, "Inspiration")
- 1999 Run Devil Run (Paul McCartney)
- 1999 Live at the Cavern (Paul McCartney, DVD)
- 2001 Living on the Outside (Jim Capaldi)
- 2001 Twister (Max Magagni)
- 2002 Dal Vero (Tolo Marton, "Stone Free", "Hey Joe")
- 2003 E-Thnik (Mario Fasciano)
- 2006 Gillan's Inn (Ian Gillan, "Sugar Plum", "Trashed", "Smoke on the Water", "No Laughing in Heaven")
- 2006 Time To Take A Stand (Moonstone Project, +2008 extended ed., "Rose in Hell", "Where Do You Hide The Blues You've Got", "Silent Hunter")
- 2007 Little Hard Blues (Andrea Ranfagni, "Forget My Boogie", )
- 2007 One Night Jam (Lee Joe Fiafari, "Sweet Girl")
- 2009 Rebel on the Run (Moonstone Project, song "Halfway To Heaven")
- 2010 Stay Tuned (Bernhard Welz, "Drum Jam – live 2002")
- 2010 Made in Verona – Live (Forever Deep – The Italian Deep Purple Tribute)
- 2011 Seeking Major Tom (William Shatner, "Space Truckin'")
- 2012 Raining Rock (Jettblack, "Feel the Love", CD single)
- 2012 A Spoonful of Time (Nektar Tribute Album, "For the Love of Money")
- 2012 Who Are You: An All Star Tribute To The Who ("Bargain")
- 2013 Forever Deep (Forever Deep, "The Wish", "Without Your Love", "Marosh")
- 2014 Shine (Bernie Marsden, "Trouble")
- 2014 Celebrating Jon Lord
- 2015 This Is The Thing #1 (Purpendicular)
- 2015 Sunflower Super Jam Live at the Royal Albert Hall 2012
- 2016 Unfolding (Steve Balsamo & Rosalie Deighton)
- 2017 "Paicey Story, Made In Breizh
- 2017 Venus To Volcanus (Purpendicular)
- 2021 DMX - X Moves (Ft. Bootsy Collins & Steve Howe & Ian Paice)
- 2021 Still Wish You Were Here - A Tribute To Pink Floyd (Cleopatra)
- 2022 Human Mechanic (Purpendicular)
- 2025 Banned (Purpendicular)

== Drum clinics/guest performances ==
Paice has been touring with his drum clinics extensively since the 1980s. Additionally, he very often gives performances with Deep Purple coverbands, playing many obscure Deep Purple songs, often never played by the band itself.

1990s

- 1992 – UK, Oxford – charity concert in aid of Leukemia Research
- 1997 – Poland
- September 1999 – Norway, Hell, Hell Blues Festival – concert with Paul Martinez (bs) and Tony Ashton (vpc/pno), also a drum clinic

2001

- March 2001 – Australia, drum clinics in Adelaide, Melbourne, and Sydney
- December 2001 – Tour of Germany with Pete York (dr), Colin Hodgkinson (bs) and Miller Anderson (voc/gtr)

2002

- 15 March 2002 – one-off concert with Italian guitarist Tolo Marton
- September 2002 – Poland, Opole – appearance at the Opole Drumming Festival

2004

- 21 June 2004 – UK, London – concert at the opening of London Drum Company with Chad Smith, Fairfield Halls, Croydon, UK, filmed and released on DVD the next year

2005

- 2005 – concert with Chad Smith at the Modern Drummer Festival, filmed and released on DVD
- 2005 – Poland, Piekary Śląskie
- 2005 – Sweden, Stockholm, Bass n' Drum Festival
- 25 May 2005 – Austria, Vienna – concert with a band led by Austrian drummer, Bernhard Welz
- 3 August 2005 – Italy, Trieste – concert with the Italian Deep Purple cover band Rain
- 29 November 2005 – UK, London – Appearance at the Clive Burr Testimonial

2006

- 13 January – UK, Reading – charity concert
- 31 March & 1 April – Germany, Frankfurt, ProLight+Sound – two concerts with Don Airey, Thijs van Leer, and others
- September – UK, London – charity concert at The Sunflower Jam, organised by Jacky Paice

2007

- 22–25 February – Netherlands/Germany/Austria – four concerts with a German Deep Purple coverband, Demon's Eye
- 2 March – UK, Wales, Glamorgan University – guest appearance in support of the Cardiff School of Creative & Cultural Industries initiative
- 20 September – UK, London – concert at The Sunflower Jam, organised by Jacky Paice
- 17 October – UK, Liverpool – concert with a Deep Purple coverband, Cheap Purple

2008

- 13 January – UK, England, London – performance at the Childline Rocks with Glenn Hughes
- 5 April – Italy, Padova – concert with an Italian Deep Purple coverband Terzo Capitolo
- 24 May – Germany, Cologne – Rock Legends Adventures
- 1 June – UK, England, Nottingham, East Midlands Conference Centre – Pearl Day 2008
- 29 August – Italy, Fano, Marina dei Cesari – drum clinic and concert with Machine Head, Italian Deep Purple coverband
- 25 September – UK, England, London – charity concert at The Sunflower Jam, organised by Jacky Paice
- 17–20 December – Short German tour with a Deep Purple coverband, Purpendicular

2009

- 8 February – Russia, Moscow – drum clinic
- 31 July – Italy, Bordighera – concert with The Running Birds
- 3 August – Italy, San Giorgio Piacentino, Dragon Beer Fest with Italian band Matt Filippucci, and Bernie Marsden
- 6 August – Italy, Fermignano, Stadio Comunale with Italian Deep Purple coverband Machine Head
- 4 September – Italy, Rome – drum clinic and concert with an Italian Deep Purple coverband Hush
- 6 September – Italy, Turin – drum clinic and concert with Phil Hilborne, Neil Murray and Doogie White as part of "Night with Jethro Tull and Deep Purple" concert
- 20 September – Paris, La Pigalle, La Baguetterie – drum clinic alongside Billy Cobham
- 24 September – UK, England, London – concert at The Sunflower Jam, organised by Jacky Paice
- 6 Nov – Poland, Bydgoszcz, Lizard King – concert with Free Blues Band (Bydgoskie Drums Fuzje 2009)
- 7 Nov – Poland, Szczecin, Free Blues Club – concert with Free Blues Band (FBB 30th anniversary celebrations)

2010

- 24 January – UK, Leamington Spa – Judged the National Young Drummer of the Year Competition
- 28 January – Italy, Verona – with Deep Purple tribute band Forever Deep
- 29 January – Spain, Vigo – with Deep Purple coverband Hush
- 30 January – Spain, La Coruña – with Deep Purple coverband Hush
- 26 March – Hungary, Győr – Győr's 11th Drummer Festival with coverband Cry Free (Hungarian Deep Purple Cover Band)
- 8 April – Italy, Padova – with Tolo Marton Band (40th anniversary of "In Rock")
- 9 April – Italy, Calvari – with Tolo Marton Band (40th anniversary of "In Rock")
- 16 December – Italy, Verona – with Deep Purple tribute band Forever Deep (special guest Tolo Marton)
- 18 December – Italy, Castelmassa (with Deep Purple tribute band Forever Deep)
- 19 December – Italy, Caserta, Polo Regency (with Deep Purple tribute band The Stage)

2011

- 1 April – Italy, Pompei, Hotel Vittoria (with Deep Purple tribute band The Stage)
- 2 April – Italy, Cremona, Highway Star Rockclub (with Matt Filippini Band)
- 5 August – Italy, Genova, Sestri Levante, Teatro Arena Conchiglia (with Tolo Marton Band)
- 6 August – Italy, Tagliacozzo, Disco Pub Duca33 (drum clinic)
- 6 August – Italy, Tagliacozzo, Complesso Turistico "Rolling Park" (with Tolo Marton Band, Somewhere in Rome and Steel Tyrant)
- 10 September – Italy, Pavia di Udine, Sagra dei Pirus (with Italian Deep Purple tribute band RAIN)
- 17 October – Argentina, Buenos Aires, Estadio Luna Park
- 18 November – Italy, Vicenza, Teatro Astra di Schio (with Italian Deep Purple tribute band Forever Deep & Tolo Marton)
- 19 November – Italy, Sassari, Vintage Cafe (drum clinic and concert with Matt Filippini Band)

2012

- 28 January – Italy, Verona, San Giovanni Lupatoto, Teatro Astra (with Italian Deep Purple tribute band Forever Deep & Tolo Marton)
- 12 February- Canada, Vaughan, Drumland (celebrity guest)
- 13 February – Canada, Toronto, Just Drums (drum clinic)
- 18 February – Canada, Calgary, Axe Music (celebrity guest)
- 10 March – Italy, Arzignano, Teatro Mattarello (with Altro Mondo & Free Soul Singers)
- 21 March – Switzerland, Patteln (with Deep Purple tribute band – Purpendicular (also including a surprise appearance of original Deep Purple bassist Roger Glover))
- 23 March – Germany, Aschaffenburg (with Deep Purple tribute band – Purpendicular)
- 2 April – UK, England, London, Palladium – Buddy Rich Memorial Concert
- 23 April – UK, England, Woodley, Berkshire, DrumWright
- 28 July – Italy, Gubbio, Teatro Romano, Purple Guitar Experience (with Blue Jade & Alex De Rosso)
- 29 July – Italy, Potenza, Vaglio Basilicata (with Pig Floyd)
- 3 August – Italy, PN, Arba (with RAIN)
- 4 August – Italy, Campobasso, Villa Rosa (drum clinic)
- 4 August – Italy, Cercemaggiore (CB), Baloma Bikers Festival (with Deep Purple tribute band – The Purple Inside)
- 5 August – Italy, Genova, Teatro Arena Conchigilia (with Tolo Marton Band)
- 6 August – Italy, Tagliacozzo, DISCO PUB "DUCA33" (drum clinic)
- 6 August – Italy, Tagliacozzo, Complesso Turistico "Rolling Park" (with Deep Purple tribute band – Perfect Strangers)
- 7 September – Italy, Palermo (with the student orchestra of Conservatorio Vincenzo Bellini conducted by Alberto Maniaci)
- 9 September – Netherlands, Ittervoort, Drumworld Adams Festival
- 17 September – UK, England, London, The British Music Experience "Practice Room" session
- 30 September – Poland, Opole, Filharmonia Opolska, Drum Fest (with Moonstone Project), also drum clinic
- 11 November – Germany, Düsseldorf, Drummers Institute
- 18 December – Italy, Canicattì, Cineteatro Odeon (with Rapture tribute band)

2014

- 7 October - Czech Republic, Brno (with Purpendicular)
- 8 October - Germany, Burgrieden (with Purpendicular)
- 9 October - Germany, Rutesheim (with Purpendicular)
- 19 December - Italy, Pistoia at Santomato live (with the Ranfa Band)

2015

- 12 March - France, Vaureal(Paris) (with Purpendicular)
- 13 March - Switzerland, Zug (with Purpendicular)
- 14 March - Germany, Burgrieden (with Purpendicular)
- 26 March - Denmark, Copenhagen (with Purpendicular)
- 27 March - Denmark, Fredericia (with Purpendicular)
- 28 March - Germany, Ahlen (with Purpendicular)

2016

- 17 March - France, Vaureal (near Paris) (with Purpendicular)
- 18 March - France, Riom (near Clermont Ferrand) (with Purpendicular)
- 19 March - Switzerland, Zug (near Zürich) (with Purpendicular)
- 20 March - Germany, Burgrieden (near Ulm) (with Purpendicular)
- 26 March - Germany, Neurupinn (near Berlin) (with Purpendicular)
- 27 March - Germany, Karlsruhe (with Purpendicular)
- 28 March - Switzerland, Pratteln (near Basel) (with Purpendicular)
- 15 April - Austria, Klagenfurt at Eboardmuseum ( with Perfect Strangers)
- 30 May - Italy, Cittanova (with Into The Purple)

2018

- 15 December - Germany, Finnentrop (with Purpendicular)

2019

- 8 June - Belgium, Zik Zak, Ittre (with Purpendicular)
- 4 August - Germany, Berlin, Biesdorfer Parkbühne (with Purpendicular)
