= Deep Purple =

British rock band

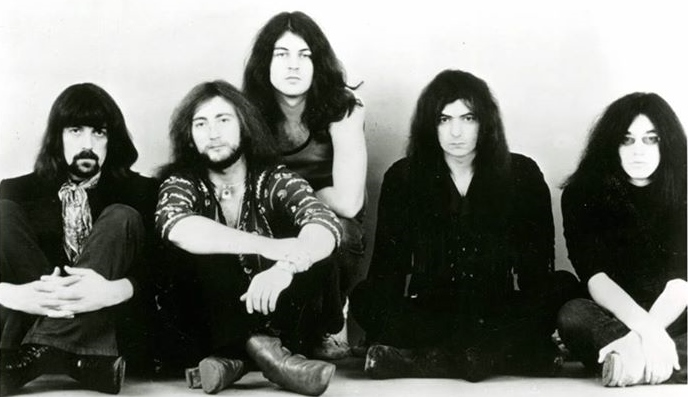
- Deep Purple's Mark II line-up in 1971. Left to right: Jon Lord, Roger Glover, Ian Gillan, Ritchie Blackmore and Ian Paice.

Background information
- Origin: London, England
- Genres: Hard rock; heavy metal; progressive rock
- Works: Discography
- Years active: 1968–1976; 1984–present
- Labels: Tetragrammaton; Warner Bros.; Polydor; BMG; EMI; Edel
- Spinoffs: Captain Beyond; Warhorse; Rainbow; Ian Gillan Band; Paice Ashton Lord; Whitesnake; Gillan; Living Loud
- Members: Ian Paice; Roger Glover; Ian Gillan; Don Airey; Simon McBride
- Past members: List of Deep Purple members
- Website: deep-purple.com
- Logo

Deep Purple are a British rock band formed in London in 1968. They are considered to be among the pioneers of heavy metal and modern hard rock, although their musical style has varied throughout their career. Originally formed as a psychedelic rock and progressive rock band, they shifted to a heavier sound with their 1970 album Deep Purple in Rock. Deep Purple have been referred to as being part of the "unholy trinity of British hard rock and heavy metal in the early to mid-'70s", alongside Led Zeppelin and Black Sabbath. Listed in the 1975 Guinness Book of World Records as "the globe's loudest band" for a 1972 concert at London's Rainbow Theatre, they have sold over 100 million records worldwide. Deep Purple have also generated several successful spinoff bands, including Rainbow, Whitesnake, and Gillan.

Deep Purple were founded by vocalist Rod Evans, guitarist Ritchie Blackmore, bassist Nick Simper, keyboardist Jon Lord and drummer Ian Paice. After three studio albums, the "Mark I" line-up came to an end in 1969 when Evans and Simper were dismissed from the band and replaced by Ian Gillan and Roger Glover respectively, forming the classic "Mark II" line-up of Deep Purple. Following the orchestral collaboration Concerto for Group and Orchestra (1969), the Mark II line-up recorded four studio albums – Deep Purple in Rock (1970), Fireball (1971), Machine Head (1972), and Who Do We Think We Are (1973) – and a live album, Made in Japan (1972), that cemented their popularity and played a key role in shaping the emerging genres of hard rock and heavy metal. Gillan and Glover both left the band in 1973 and were replaced by David Coverdale and Glenn Hughes respectively. The "Mark III" line-up recorded two studio albums, Burn and Stormbringer (both 1974), and Blackmore parted ways with the band in 1975 due to musical differences. He was replaced by Tommy Bolin, and the resulting "Mark IV" line-up made one studio album, Come Taste the Band (1975). Deep Purple disbanded in July 1976, and Bolin died from a drug overdose five months later.

The "Mark II" line-up reunited in 1984, and recorded two studio albums, Perfect Strangers (1984) and The House of Blue Light (1987), before Gillan was fired in 1989 due to creative and personal differences within the band. He was replaced by Joe Lynn Turner, who appeared on one album, Slaves and Masters (1990), before his dismissal from the band in 1992. Gillan returned for the next album, The Battle Rages On... (1993). Blackmore left the band again in 1993, and was replaced temporarily by Joe Satriani and then permanently by Steve Morse. The "Mark VII" line-up (consisting of Paice, Lord, Gillan, Glover and Morse) lasted for nearly a decade, during which the band recorded two studio albums, Purpendicular (1996) and Abandon (1998). Lord retired from Deep Purple in 2002 and was replaced by Don Airey, leaving Paice as the only remaining original member. The "Mark VIII" line-up of Paice, Gillan, Glover, Morse and Airey was the longest-lasting line-up in the band's history, spanning twenty years and six studio albums. Their first line-up change in twenty years took place in 2022, when Morse left after twenty-eight years as guitarist and was replaced by Simon McBride.

Deep Purple were ranked number 22 on VH1's Greatest Artists of Hard Rock programme, and a poll on radio station Planet Rock ranked them fifth among the "most influential bands ever". The band received a Legend Award at the 2008 World Music Awards, and were inducted into the Rock and Roll Hall of Fame in 2016.

== History ==
=== Beginnings (1967–1968) ===
In 1967, former Searchers drummer Chris Curtis contacted London businessman Tony Edwards, in the hope he would manage a new group he was assembling, to be called Roundabout. Curtis' vision was a "supergroup" where the band members would 'get on' and 'get off', like a musical roundabout. Impressed with the plan, Edwards agreed to finance the venture with his two business partners John Coletta and Ron Hire, who composed Hire-Edwards-Coletta Enterprises (HEC).

The first recruit to the band was classically trained Hammond organ player Jon Lord, Curtis' flatmate, who had most notably played with the Artwoods (led by Art Wood, brother of future Faces and Rolling Stones guitarist Ronnie Wood, and including Keef Hartley). Lord had most recently been performing in a backing band for the vocal group The Flower Pot Men, along with bassist Nick Simper and drummer Carlo Little (Simper had previously been in Johnny Kidd and the Pirates, and survived the 1966 car crash that killed Kidd). Lord alerted Simper and Little that he had been recruited for the Roundabout project, and they suggested guitarist Ritchie Blackmore, whom Lord had never met. Simper had known Blackmore since the early 1960s when his first band, the Renegades, debuted around the same time as one of Blackmore's early bands, the Dominators.

HEC persuaded Blackmore to travel from Hamburg to audition for the new group. He was making a name for himself as a studio session guitarist, and had also been a member of the Outlaws, Screaming Lord Sutch & the Savages, and Neil Christian & the Crusaders; the latter band was the reason he had moved to Germany. Curtis' erratic behaviour and lifestyle, fuelled by his use of LSD, caused him to display a sudden lack of interest in the project he had started, and HEC dismissed him from Roundabout. HEC were now intrigued with the possibilities Lord and Blackmore brought and persuaded Blackmore to move back to England. Lord and Blackmore began recruiting additional members, retaining Tony Edwards as their manager. Lord convinced Nick Simper to join on bass, but Blackmore insisted they leave Carlo Little behind in favour of drummer Bobby Woodman. Woodman was the former drummer for Vince Taylor's Play-Boys (for whom he had played under the name Bobbie Clarke). The band, still calling themselves Roundabout, started rehearsing and writing in Cadogan Gardens in South Kensington.

In March 1968, Lord, Blackmore, Simper, and Woodman moved into Deeves Hall, a country house in South Mimms, Hertfordshire. The band lived, wrote, and rehearsed at the house; it was fully kitted out with the latest Marshall amplification and, at Lord's request, a Hammond C3 organ. According to Simper, dozens of singers were auditioned (including Rod Stewart and Woodman's friend Dave Curtiss) until the group heard Rod Evans of club band the Maze, and thought his voice fitted their style well. Tagging along with Evans was his band's drummer Ian Paice. Blackmore had seen an 18-year-old Paice on tour with the Maze in Germany in 1966 and had been impressed by his drumming. The band hastily arranged an audition for Paice, given that Woodman was vocally unhappy with the direction of the band's music. Both Paice and Evans won their respective jobs, and the line-up was complete.

During a brief tour of Denmark and Sweden in April, in which they were still billed as Roundabout, Blackmore suggested a new name: Deep Purple, after his grandmother's favourite song, "Deep Purple" by Peter DeRose. The group had resolved to choose a name after everyone had posted one on a board in rehearsal. Second to Deep Purple was "Concrete God", which the band thought was too harsh to take on, while other names suggested included "Orpheus" and "Sugarlump".

=== Mark I (1968–1969) ===
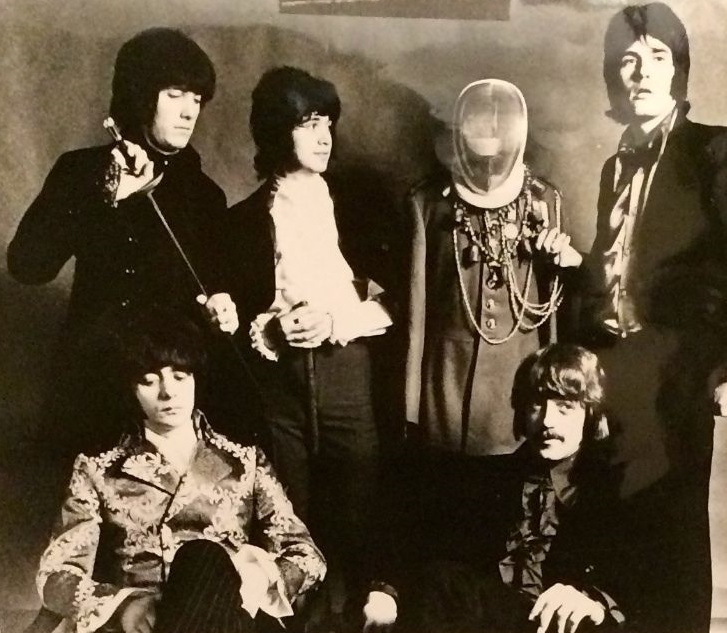
Deep Purple Mark I in 1968. Standing left to right: Nick Simper, Ian Paice, Rod Evans; seated left to right: Ritchie Blackmore, Jon Lord.

In May 1968, the band moved into Pye Studios in London's Marble Arch to record their debut album, Shades of Deep Purple, which was released in America in July by Tetragrammaton Records, and in Britain in September by EMI Records. Vanilla Fudge was a notable influence on the band, with Blackmore claiming that the group started out wanting to be a "Vanilla Fudge clone". The group had success in North America with a cover of Joe South's "Hush", and by September 1968, the song had reached No. 4 on the Billboard Hot 100 in the US and No. 2 in the Canadian RPM chart, pushing the Shades LP up to No. 24 on Billboard's pop albums chart. The following month, Deep Purple were booked to support Cream on the US leg of their Goodbye tour.

The band's second album, The Book of Taliesyn, was recorded quickly and released in North America in October 1968 to coincide with the tour. It included Neil Diamond's "Kentucky Woman", which cracked the Top 40 in both the US (No. 38 on the Billboard chart) and Canada (No. 21 on the RPM chart), though sales for the album were not as strong (No. 54 in US, No. 48 in Canada). The Book of Taliesyn was not released in the band's home country until the following year and, like its predecessor, it failed to have much impact on the UK Albums Chart. During the late 1968 US tour, the band made several high-profile television appearances, including Playboy After Dark and The Dating Game (where, in addition to the band performing, Lord appeared as a contestant).

Early in 1969, the band released the non-album single "Emmaretta", named after Emmaretta Marks, at that time a cast member of the musical Hair, whom Evans was trying to seduce. By March of that year, the band had completed recording for their third album, Deep Purple. The album included the track "April", which featured strings and woodwind, showcasing Lord's classical influences such as Bach and Rimsky-Korsakov.

Deep Purple's North American record label, Tetragrammaton, delayed production of the Deep Purple album until after the band's 1969 American tour ended. This, as well as lackluster promotion by the nearly-broke label, caused the album to sell poorly, finishing well out of the Billboard Top 100. Soon after Deep Purple was released in late June 1969, Tetragrammaton went out of business, leaving the band with no money and an uncertain future. Tetragrammaton's assets were eventually assumed by Warner Bros. Records, who released Deep Purple's records in the US through the 1970s.

During the 1969 American tour, Lord and Blackmore met with Paice to discuss their desire to develop the heavy rock side of the band further. They decided that Evans and Simper would not fit well with the style they envisioned, and both were replaced that summer. Paice stated, "A change had to come. If they hadn't left, the band would have totally disintegrated." Both Simper and Blackmore noted that Rod Evans already had one foot out of the door. Simper said that Evans had met a girl in Hollywood and had eyes on being an actor, while Blackmore explained, "Rod just wanted to go to America and live in America." Evans and Simper were later co-founders of the bands Captain Beyond and Warhorse respectively.

=== Mark II (1969–1973) ===
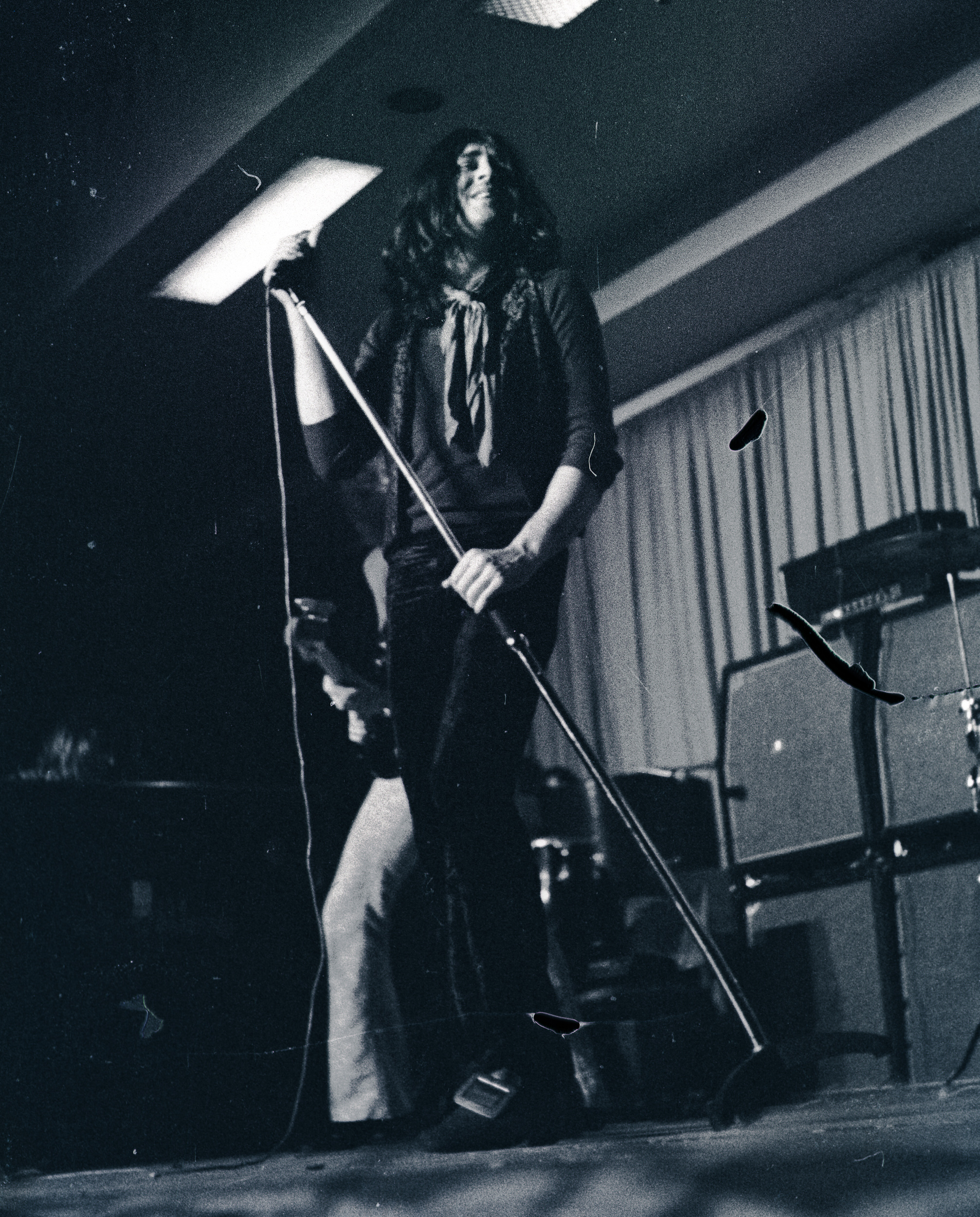
Ian Gillan in 1970

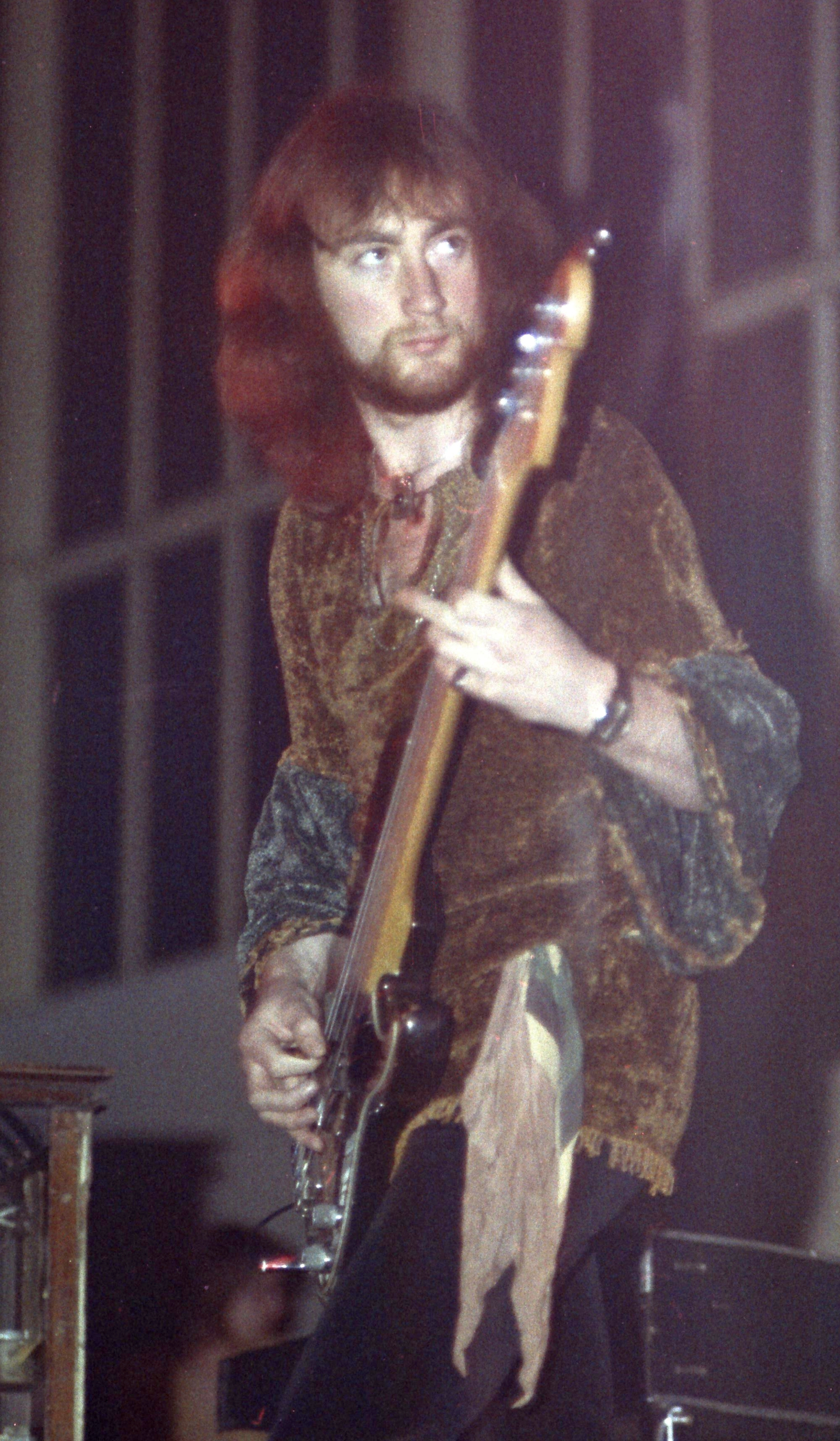
Roger Glover in 1971

Deep Purple Mark II was formed in Hanwell Community Centre in West London in the summer of 1969. In search of a new vocalist, Blackmore set his own sights on 19-year-old singer Terry Reid. Though he found the offer "flattering", Reid was still bound by an exclusive recording contract with his producer Mickie Most and more interested in his solo career. Blackmore had to look elsewhere. The band sought out singer Ian Gillan from Episode Six, a band that had released several singles in the UK without achieving any great commercial success. Six's drummer Mick Underwood – an old comrade of Blackmore's from his days in the Outlaws – introduced the band to Gillan and bassist Roger Glover. According to Nick Simper, "Gillan would join only with Roger Glover." This effectively killed Episode Six, which gave Underwood a persistent feeling of guilt that lasted nearly a decade, until Gillan recruited him for his new post-Purple band in the late 1970s. According to Blackmore, Deep Purple was only interested in Gillan and not Glover, but Glover was retained on the advice of Ian Paice.

"He turned up for the session...he was their bass player. We weren't originally going to take him until Paicey said, 'he's a good bass player, let's keep him.' So I said okay."

— Ritchie Blackmore on the hiring of Roger Glover

Mark II's first release was a Roger Greenaway–Roger Cook tune titled "Hallelujah". At the time of its recording, Nick Simper still thought he was in the band and had called John Coletta to inquire about the recording dates for the song. He then found that the song had already been recorded with Glover on bass. The remaining original members of Deep Purple then instructed management to inform Simper that he had been officially replaced. Despite television appearances to promote the "Hallelujah" single in the UK, the song flopped. Blackmore had told the British weekly music newspaper Record Mirror that the band "need to have a commercial record in Britain", and described the song as "an in-between sort of thing"—a compromise between the type of material the band would normally record, and openly commercial material.

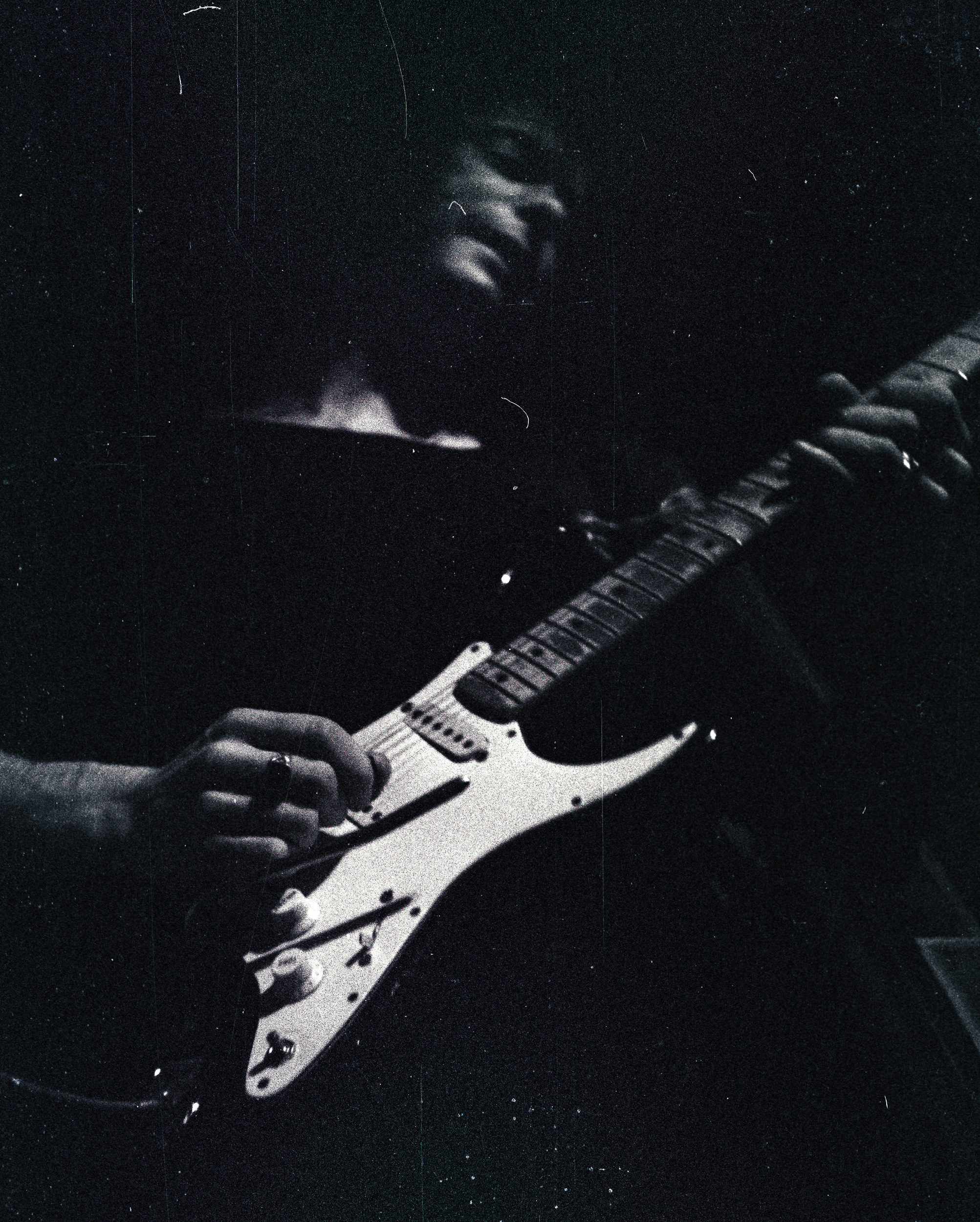
Ritchie Blackmore in Hannover, Germany, 1970

In September 1969, the band gained some much-needed publicity in the UK with the Concerto for Group and Orchestra, a three-movement epic composed by Lord as a solo project and performed by the band at the Royal Albert Hall in London with the Royal Philharmonic Orchestra, conducted by Malcolm Arnold. Alongside Days of Future Passed by the Moody Blues and Five Bridges by the Nice, it was one of the first collaborations between a rock band and an orchestra. This live album became their first release with any kind of chart success in the UK. Gillan and Blackmore were less than happy at the band being tagged as "a group who played with orchestras", both feeling that the Concerto was a distraction that would get in the way of developing their desired hard-rocking style. Lord acknowledged that while the band members were not keen on the project going in, at the end of the performance "you could have put the five smiles together and spanned the Thames." Lord would also write the Gemini Suite, another orchestra/group collaboration in the same vein, for the band in late 1970, although the band's recording of the piece would not be released until 1993. In 1975, Blackmore stated that he thought the Concerto for Group and Orchestra was not bad but that the Gemini Suite was horrible and very disjointed. Roger Glover later noted that Jon Lord had appeared to be the leader of the band in the early years.

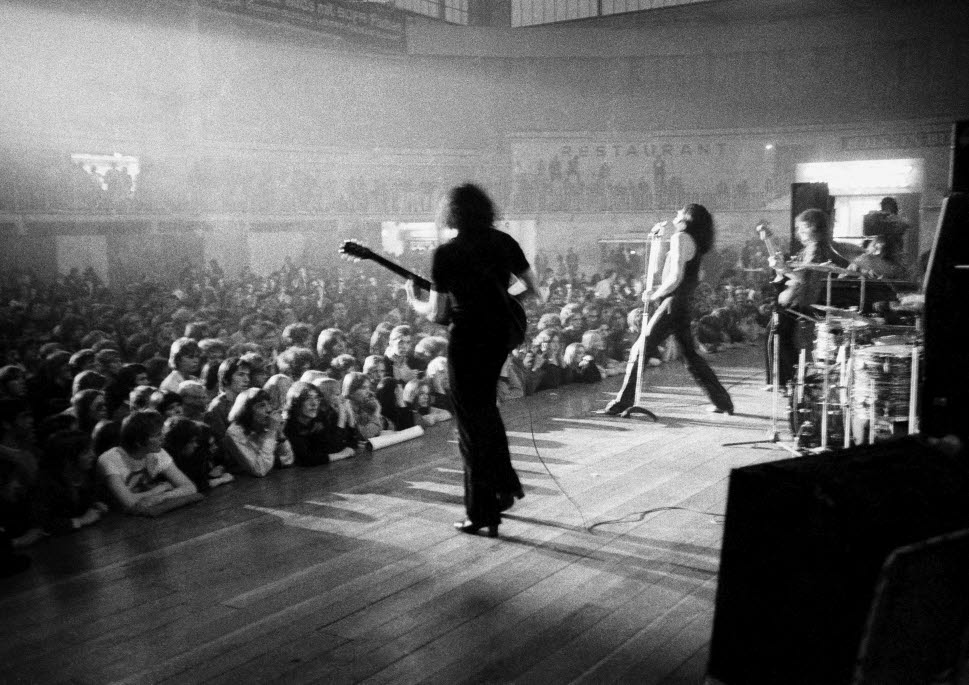
Deep Purple Mark II live in Germany in 1970

Shortly after the orchestral release, Mark II began a hectic touring and recording schedule that was to see little respite for the next four years. The second album, and first studio album, of the Mark II era, released in 1970, was In Rock (a title supported by the album's Mount Rushmore–inspired cover), which contained "Speed King", "Into the Fire" and "Child in Time", all of which were staples of the band's live performances during that period. The non-album single "Black Night", released around the same time, finally put Deep Purple into the UK Top 10. The interplay between Blackmore's guitar and Lord's distorted organ, coupled with Gillan's powerful, wide-ranging vocals and the rhythm section of Glover and Paice, now started to take on a unique identity that separated the band from its earlier albums. Along with Zeppelin's Led Zeppelin II and Sabbath's Paranoid, In Rock codified the budding heavy metal genre.

On the album's development, Blackmore stated: "I got fed up with playing with classical orchestras, and thought, 'well, this is my turn.' Jon was into more classical. I said, 'well you've done that, I'll do rock, and whatever turns out best we'll carry on with.'" In Rock performed well, especially in the UK where it reached No. 4, while the "Black Night" single reached No. 2 on the UK Singles Chart, and the band performed the song live on the BBC's Top of the Pops. In addition to increasing sales in the UK, the band were making a name for themselves as a live act, particularly with regard to the sheer volume of their shows and the improvisational skills of Blackmore and Lord. Said Lord, "We took from jazz, we took from old fashioned rock and roll, we took from the classics. Ritchie and myself...used to swap musical jokes and attacks. He would play something, and I'd have to see if I could match it. That provided a sense of humour, a sense of tension to the band, a sense of, 'what the hell's going to happen next?' The audience didn't know, and nine times out of ten, neither did we!"

A second Mark II studio album, the creatively progressive Fireball, was issued in the summer of 1971, reaching No. 1 on the UK Albums Chart. The title track "Fireball" was released as a single, as was "Strange Kind of Woman", not from the album but recorded during the same sessions (although it replaced "Demon's Eye" on the US version of the album). "Strange Kind of Woman" became their second UK Top 10 single, reaching No. 8.

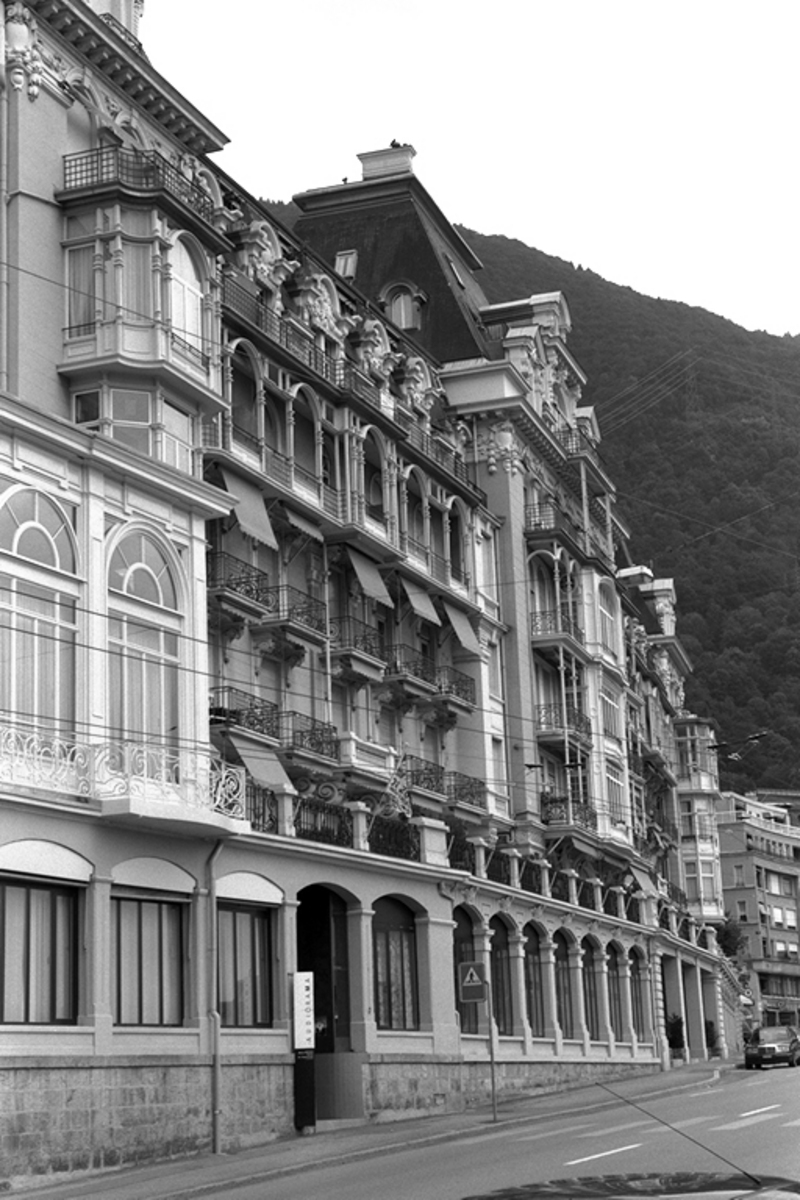
Grand Hôtel de Territet outside Montreux where Machine Head – excluding "Smoke on the Water" – was recorded in December 1971

Within weeks of Fireball's release, the band were already performing songs planned for the next album. One song (which later became "Highway Star") was performed at the first show of the Fireball tour, having been written on the bus to a show in Portsmouth, in answer to a journalist's question: "How do you go about writing songs?" On 24 October 1971 during the US leg of the Fireball tour, the band was set to play the Auditorium Theatre in Chicago when Ian Gillan contracted hepatitis, forcing the band to play without him, with bassist Glover singing the set. After this, the rest of the US dates were cancelled and the band flew home.

In early December 1971, the band travelled to Switzerland to record Machine Head. The album was due to be recorded at the Montreux Casino using the Rolling Stones Mobile Studio, but a fire during a Frank Zappa and the Mothers of Invention concert, caused by a man firing a flare gun into the ceiling, burned down the Casino.The shot caused the venue's heating system to explode. There was no loss of life due to the fire. This was mainly due to it being a less than full afternoon show and that the drummer's kit malfunctioned, causing many audience members to leave. This incident famously inspired the song "Smoke on the Water". The album was later recorded in a corridor at the nearby empty Grand Hôtel de Territet, with the exception of the music track to "Smoke on the Water". That was recorded at a vacant theatre called The Pavillon before the band was asked to leave. On recording "Smoke on the Water", Blackmore stated to BBC Radio 2: "We did the whole thing in about four takes because we had to. The police were banging on the door. We knew it was the police, but we had such a good sound in this hall. We were waking up all the neighbours for about five miles in Montreux, because it was echo-ing through the mountains. I was just getting the last part of the riff down, we'd just finished it, when the police burst in and said 'you've got to stop'. We had the track down."

Continuing to progress the musical direction of the previous two albums, Machine Head was released in late March 1972 and became one of the band's most famous releases. It was the band's second No. 1 album in the UK while re-establishing them in North America, hitting No. 7 in the US and No. 1 in Canada. It included tracks that became live classics, such as "Highway Star", "Space Truckin'", "Lazy" and "Smoke on the Water", the last of which remains Deep Purple's most famous song. They continued to tour and record at a rate that would be rare thirty years on; when Machine Head was recorded, the group had only been together three-and-a-half years, yet it was their sixth studio album and seventh album overall.

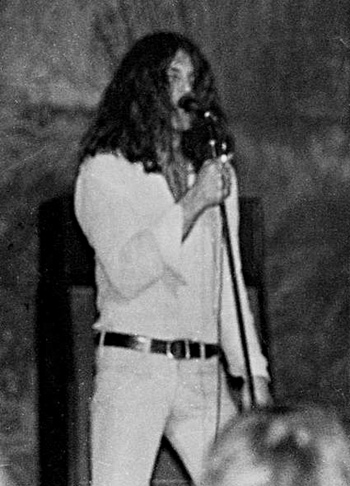
Ian Gillan on stage in Clemson, South Carolina, 1972

In January 1972, the band returned to tour the US once again. They then headed over to play Europe before resuming US dates in March. While in America, Blackmore contracted hepatitis, and the band attempted one show in Flint, Michigan, without a guitarist before attempting to acquire the services of Al Kooper, who rehearsed with the band before bowing out, suggesting Spirit guitarist Randy California instead. California played one show with the group, in Quebec City, Quebec on 6 April, but the rest of this tour was cancelled as well.

The band returned to the US in late May 1972 to undertake their third North America tour (of four total that year). A Japan tour in August of that year led to a double live album, Made in Japan. Originally intended as a Japan-only release, its worldwide release became an instant hit, reaching platinum status in five countries, including the US. It remains one of rock music's most popular and highest selling live albums.

Mark II continued to work and released the album Who Do We Think We Are in 1973. Spawning the hit single "Woman from Tokyo", the album hit No. 4 in the UK charts and No. 15 in the US chart, while achieving gold record status faster than any Deep Purple album released up to that time. However, internal tensions and exhaustion were more noticeable than ever. Following the successes of Machine Head and Made in Japan, the addition of Who Do We Think We Are made Deep Purple the top-selling artists of 1973 in the US.

Gillan admitted in a 1984 interview that the band were pushed by management to complete the Who Do We Think We Are album on time and go on tour, although they badly needed a break. The bad feelings, including tensions with Blackmore, culminated in Gillan quitting the band after their second tour of Japan in the summer of 1973, followed by the dismissal of Glover, at Blackmore's insistence. In interviews later, Lord called the end of Mark II while the band was at its peak "the biggest shame in rock and roll; God knows what we would have done over the next three or four years. We were writing so well."

=== Mark III (1973–1975) ===
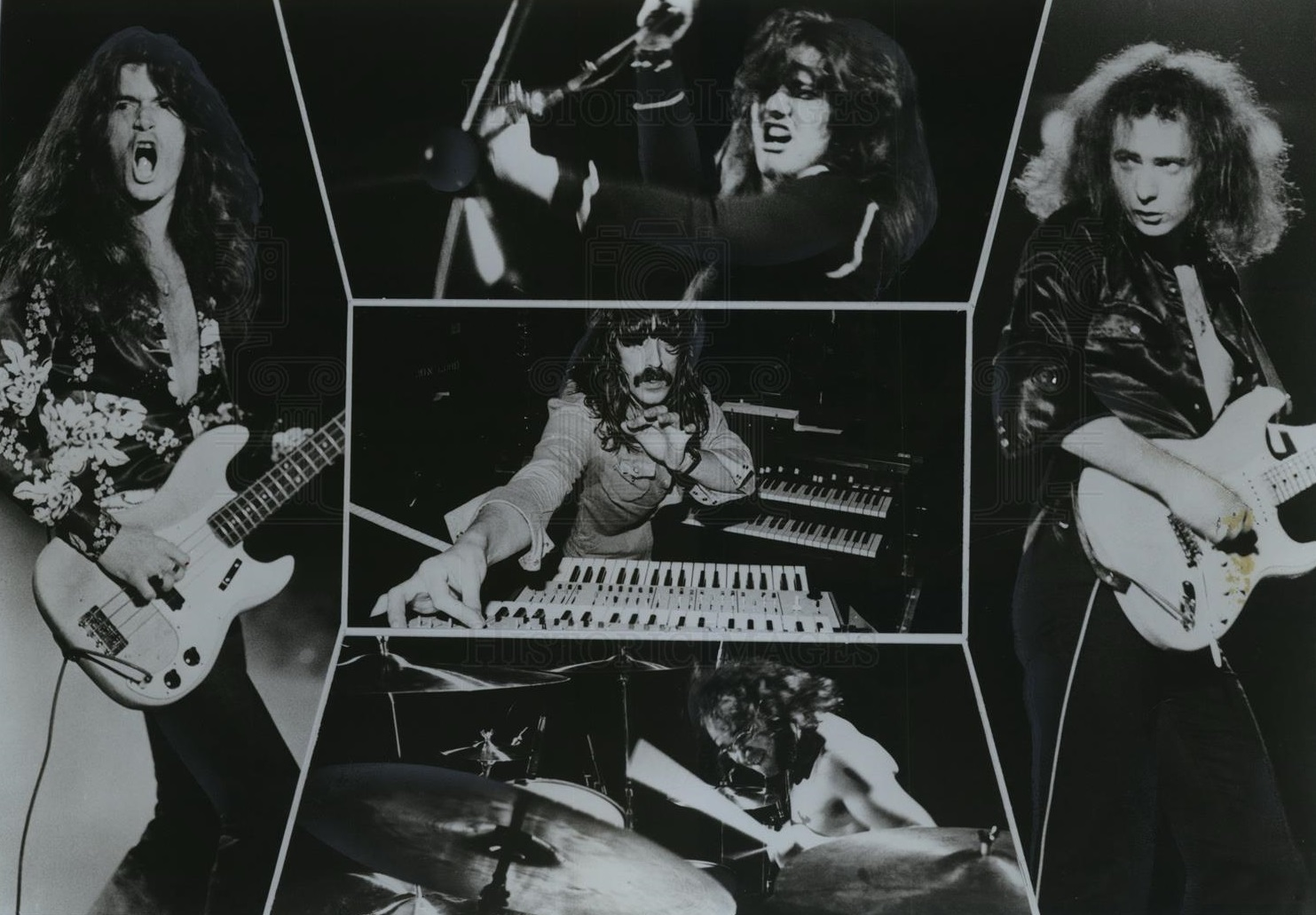
Collage of Deep Purple Mark III in 1974, with Glenn Hughes (left), David Coverdale (top), Jon Lord (middle), Ian Paice (bottom), Ritchie Blackmore (right).

The band hired Midlands bassist/vocalist Glenn Hughes, formerly of Trapeze. According to Paice, Glover told him and Lord a few months before his official termination that he wanted to leave the band, so they had started to drop in on Trapeze shows. After acquiring Hughes, they debated continuing as a four-piece, with Hughes as bassist and lead vocalist. According to Hughes, he was told the band was bringing in Paul Rodgers of Free as a co-lead vocalist, but by that time Rodgers had just started Bad Company. "They did ask", Rodgers recalled, "and I spoke to all of them at length about the possibility. Purple had toured Australia with Free's final lineup. I didn't do it because I was very much into the idea of forming Bad Company." Instead, auditions were held for lead vocal replacements. They settled on David Coverdale, an unknown singer from Saltburn in north-east England, primarily because Blackmore liked his masculine, blues-tinged voice.

Burn, the first album by Deep Purple Mark III, was released in February 1974 to great success, reaching No. 3 in the UK and No. 9 in the US, and was followed by another world tour. The title track, which opens the album and would open most concerts during the Mark III and IV eras, was a conscious effort by the band to embrace the progressive rock movement, which was popularised at the time by bands such as Yes, King Crimson, Emerson, Lake & Palmer, Genesis and Gentle Giant. Another notable song and Mk. III concert staple from the album was a slow-burning blues number called "Mistreated".

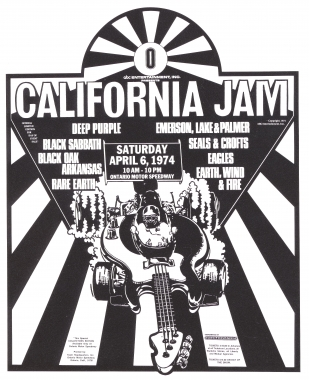
Deep Purple co-headlined the California Jam in 1974. They played to over 300,000 people at the Ontario Motor Speedway in Ontario, Southern California.

Mark III embarked on a spring tour that included shows at Madison Square Garden, New York City, on 13 March, and Nassau Coliseum four days later. The band co-headlined (with Emerson, Lake & Palmer) the California Jam festival at Ontario Motor Speedway in Ontario, southern California, on 6 April 1974. Attracting over 300,000 fans, the festival also included 1970s rock giants Black Sabbath, Eagles, Seals & Crofts and Earth, Wind & Fire. Portions of the show were telecast on ABC Television in the US, exposing the band to a wider audience. During the show Blackmore doused his amplifiers with petrol and set them on fire, blowing a hole in the stage. A month later, the band's 22 May performance at the Gaumont State Cinema in Kilburn, London, was recorded and later released in 1982 as Live in London.

Hughes and Coverdale brought vocal harmonies and elements of funk and blues, respectively, to the band's music, a sound that was even more apparent on the late 1974 release Stormbringer. Along with the title track, the Stormbringer album had a number of songs that received significant radio play, such as "Lady Double Dealer", "The Gypsy" and "Soldier of Fortune", and the album reached No. 6 in the UK and No. 20 on the US Billboard chart. Blackmore publicly disliked most of the album, however, derisively calling it "shoeshine music" out of distaste for its funk and soul elements. A new live album, Made in Europe, culled from three shows on the Stormbringer tour, was assembled during the summer of 1975, but would not see release until late 1976. After the show in Stuttgart–Böblingen, Blackmore announced on 26 March 1975 to his co-musicians in a room of the Arabella Hotel in Munich that he was quitting the band. Lord, Paice, Coverdale and Hughes were speechless, for a few weeks later the band were due to go into the studio to record their next album. Blackmore's departure from Deep Purple, and therefore the end of Mark III, was announced on 21 June 1975. Blackmore then formed his own band with Ronnie James Dio of Elf, called Ritchie Blackmore's Rainbow, shortened to Rainbow after the first album.

=== Mark IV (1975–1976) ===
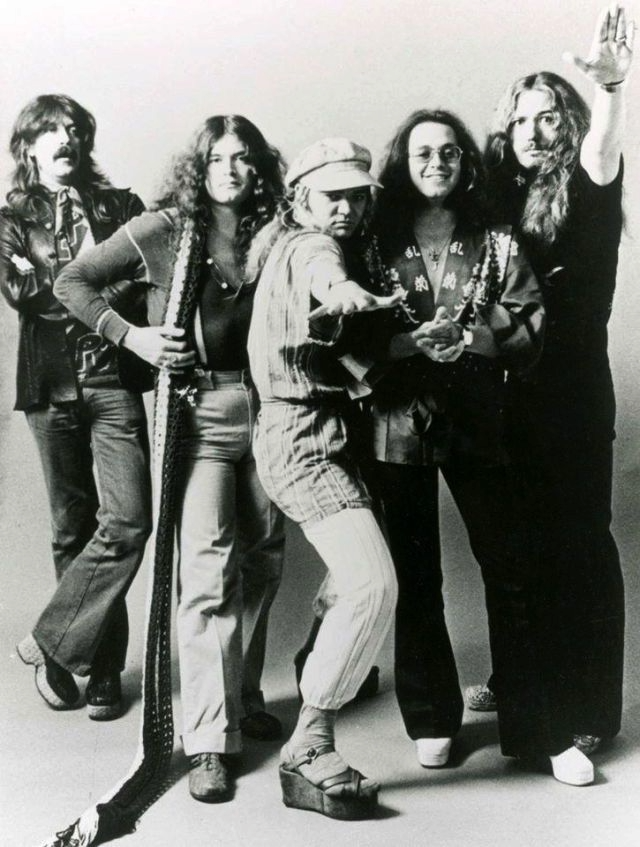
Deep Purple Mark IV in 1976. Left to right: Jon Lord, Glenn Hughes, Tommy Bolin, Ian Paice, David Coverdale.

Following Blackmore's departure, the group considered disbanding but decided to continue and find another guitarist. Clem Clempson (Colosseum, Humble Pie), Zal Cleminson (The Sensational Alex Harvey Band), Mick Ronson (The Spiders From Mars) and Rory Gallagher were considered; the final choice was American Tommy Bolin. There are at least two versions of the Bolin recruitment story: Coverdale claims to have been the one who suggested auditioning Bolin. "He walked in, thin as a rake, his hair coloured green, yellow and blue with feathers in it. Slinking along beside him was this stunning Hawaiian girl in a crochet dress with nothing on underneath. He plugged into four Marshall 100-watt stacks and...the job was his." But in an interview published by Melody Maker in June 1975, Bolin claimed that he came to the audition following a recommendation from Blackmore. Bolin had been a member of many late-1960s bands – Denny & The Triumphs, American Standard, and Zephyr, which released three albums from 1969 to 1972. Before he joined Deep Purple, Bolin's best-known recordings had been made as a session musician on Billy Cobham's 1973 jazz fusion album Spectrum, and as lead guitarist on two post-Joe Walsh James Gang albums: Bang (1973) and Miami (1974). He had also played with Dr. John, Albert King, the Good Rats, Moxy and Alphonse Mouzon, and was busy working on his first solo album, Teaser, when he accepted the invitation to join Deep Purple.

The resulting album from Deep Purple Mark IV, Come Taste the Band, was released in October 1975, one month before Bolin's Teaser album. Despite mixed reviews and middling sales (No. 19 in the UK and No. 43 in the US), the collection revitalised the band once again, bringing a new, extreme funk edge to their hard rock sound. Bolin's influence was crucial, and with encouragement from Hughes and Coverdale, the guitarist developed much of the album's material. Despite Bolin's talents, his personal problems with hard drugs began to surface. During the Come Taste the Band tour, many fans openly booed Bolin's inability to play solos like Ritchie Blackmore, not realising that Bolin was physically hampered by his addiction. At this same time, as he admitted in interviews years later, Hughes was suffering from cocaine addiction.

The last show on the tour was on 15 March 1976 at the Liverpool Empire Theatre. At the end of the concert, Coverdale walked off in tears and handed in his resignation. He was told there was no band left to quit, as Lord and Paice had already decided to break up the band. The break-up was made public in July 1976, with then-manager Rob Cooksey issuing a statement: "The band will not record or perform together as Deep Purple again". Last Concert in Japan, a live album of the last concert on the Japanese leg of the Come Taste the Band tour, was issued in 1977.

Bolin went on to record his second solo album, Private Eyes. On 4 December 1976, after a show in Miami supporting Jeff Beck, Bolin was found unconscious by his girlfriend and bandmates. Unable to wake him, she hurriedly called paramedics, but it was too late. The official cause of death was multiple-drug intoxication. Bolin was 25 years old.

=== Band split (1976–1984) ===
After the break-up, most of the members of Deep Purple went on to have considerable success in a number of other bands, including Rainbow (1975–1984; Ritchie Blackmore and, from 1979, Roger Glover), Whitesnake (1978–2022; David Coverdale, Jon Lord until 1984, and Ian Paice during 1979–1982) and Gillan (1978–1982; Ian Gillan). Gillan also joined Black Sabbath from late 1982 to early 1984 (Glenn Hughes would also join Sabbath for a short time later in the 1980s). The then-defunct Deep Purple began to gain a type of mystical status, with fan-driven reissues and newly assembled live and compilation albums being released throughout the late 1970s and early 1980s. This fuelled a number of promoter-led attempts to get the band to reform, especially with the revival of the hard rock market in the late 1970s and early 1980s. In 1980, a touring version of the band surfaced; of this, Rod Evans, who had left Captain Beyond at the end of 1973, was the only member who had ever been in Deep Purple. The legitimate Deep Purple camp brought legal action over unauthorised use of the name; this was eventually successful, and Evans was ordered to pay damages of US$672,000 for using the band name without permission.

=== Mark II reunion (1984–1989) ===
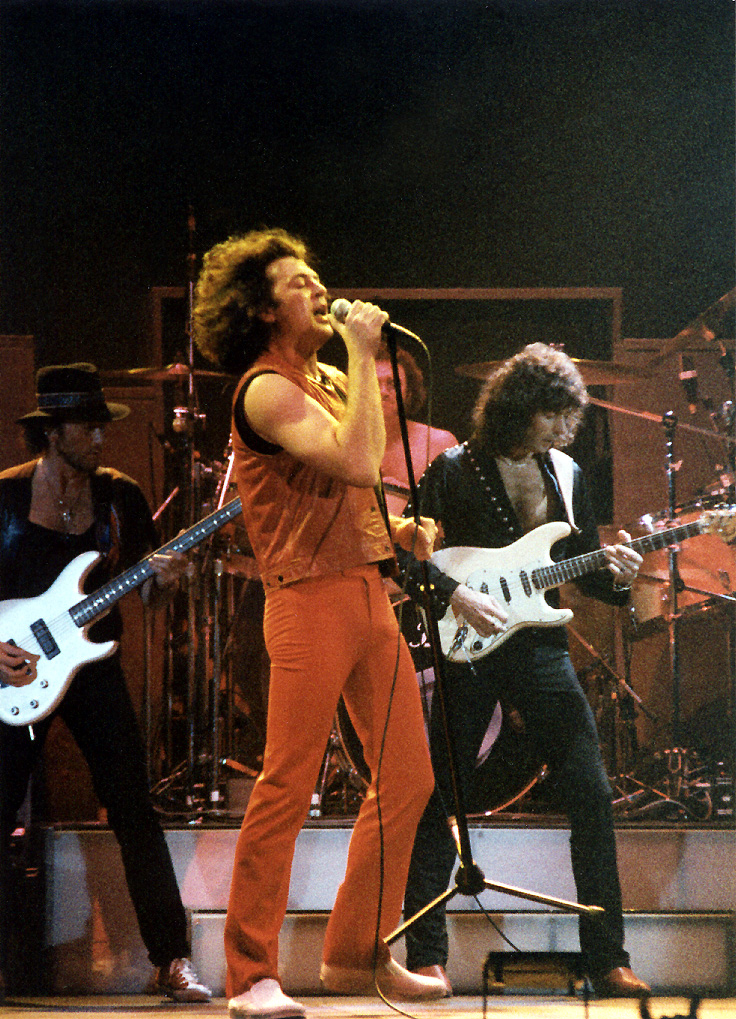
Deep Purple Mark II during their reunion tour at the Cow Palace, San Francisco, 1985. Pictured left to right: Roger Glover, Ian Gillan, Ian Paice, Richie Blackmore (out of shot: Jon Lord).

In April 1984, eight years after the demise of Deep Purple, a full-scale (and legal) reunion took place with the "classic" Mark II line-up of 1969–1973: Jon Lord, Ian Paice, Ritchie Blackmore, Ian Gillan and Roger Glover. The reformed band signed a worldwide deal with PolyGram, with Mercury Records releasing their albums in the US, and Polydor Records in the UK and other countries. The album Perfect Strangers was recorded in Vermont and released in October 1984. The album was commercially successful, reaching No. 5 in the UK Albums Chart and No. 17 on the Billboard 200 in the US. The album included the singles and concert staples "Knocking at Your Back Door" and "Perfect Strangers". Perfect Strangers became the second Deep Purple album to go platinum in the US, following Machine Head (Made in Japan would also finally hit platinum status in the US in 1986, the same year Machine Head increased to double platinum).

The reunion tour followed, starting in Australia and winding its way across the world to North America, then into Europe by the following summer. Financially, the tour was also a tremendous success. In the US, the 1985 tour out-grossed every other artist except Bruce Springsteen. The UK homecoming saw the band headline the 1985 Knebworth Fayre in June, where the weather was bad (torrential rain and 6 inches (15 cm) of mud) in front of 80,000 fans. The gig was called the "Return of the Knebworth Fayre".

Mark II followed Perfect Strangers with The House of Blue Light in 1987, which was supported by another world tour (interrupted after Blackmore broke a finger on stage while trying to catch his guitar after throwing it in the air). A new live album Nobody's Perfect, which was culled from several shows on this tour, was released in 1988. In the UK a new Mark II version of "Hush" was also released in 1988 to celebrate the 20th anniversary of Deep Purple.

=== Mark V (1989–1992) ===
Gillan was fired in 1989; his relations with Blackmore had again soured, and their musical differences had diverged too far. Originally, the band intended to recruit Survivor frontman Jimi Jamison as Gillan's replacement. After two weeks of sessions with the band, however, Jamison announced he could not join Deep Purple owing to complications with Scotti Brothers Records, his record label. Eventually, after auditioning several high-profile candidates, including Brian Howe (White Spirit, Ted Nugent, Bad Company), Doug Pinnick (King's X), Australians Jimmy Barnes (Cold Chisel) and John Farnham (Little River Band), Terry Brock (Strangeways, Giant) and Norman "Kal" Swan (Tytan, Lion, Bad Moon Rising), the band agreed on Joe Lynn Turner, who had previously been a member of Rainbow with Blackmore and Glover.

This Mark V line-up recorded just one album, Slaves and Masters (1990), and undertook a world tour for most of 1991. The album achieved modest success, reaching No. 45 in the UK and No. 87 in the US Billboard chart, with some fans and critics feeling the music was closer in style to Rainbow than to Deep Purple.

=== Second Mark II reunion (1992–1993) and Mark VI (1993–1994) ===
With the tour complete, the band set to work on another album, the early sessions of which would see Turner being forced out. 1993 was going to be Deep Purple's 25th anniversary year, with Lord, Paice and Glover (and the record company) wanting Gillan back for another Mark II reunion to celebrate this milestone. Although Blackmore preferred Turner to remain in the group, he grudgingly relented, after requesting and eventually receiving $250,000 in his bank account and Mark II completed the aptly titled The Battle Rages On... in 1993.

Blackmore still disagreed with the decision, which created more tension between himself and the rest of the band, especially Gillan. Of particular contention was that Gillan had reworked much of the material that had been written with Turner for the new album. Blackmore felt that Gillan's rewrites had made the songs less melodic than they had been in their original versions. The band began a European tour, which was documented on the live album Come Hell or High Water, released in 1994. A live home video of the same name was also released, covering a show in Birmingham, England, that displayed a very disgruntled Blackmore, who did not perform many of the guitar parts and who at one point threw a cup of water at a cameraman, for unknown reasons. The complete show was eventually released in 2006 as Live at the NEC but was quickly withdrawn after Gillan publicly complained, feeling it represented a bad time in the group's history: "It was one of the lowest points of my life – all of our lives, actually".

Blackmore left Deep Purple for the second and final time after a show in Helsinki, Finland, in November 1993. Joe Satriani was drafted to complete the Japanese dates in December and stayed on for a European summer tour in 1994. He was asked to join permanently, but his contractual commitments with Epic Records were prohibitive. In August 1994, the band unanimously chose Steve Morse, of Dixie Dregs and Kansas, as their new guitarist.

"Musically, it was very satisfying. The setlist was straight out of classic rock heaven. And the band were just great. Their timing was just fantastic."

— Guitarist Joe Satriani on his brief period with Deep Purple.

=== Mark VII (1994–2002) ===
Morse's arrival revitalised the band creatively, and in 1996 a new album titled Purpendicular was released, showing a wide variety of musical styles – though in the post-grunge mid-1990s it was no surprise that it never made chart success on the Billboard 200 in the US. This Mark VII line-up then released a new live album Live at The Olympia '96 in 1997. With a revamped set list to tour, Deep Purple enjoyed successful tours throughout the rest of the 1990s, releasing the harder-sounding Abandon in 1998, and touring with renewed enthusiasm.

1999 marked the 30th anniversary of the Concerto for Group and Orchestra. Lord, with the help of a Dutch fan, Marco de Goeij, who was also a musicologist and composer, painstakingly recreated the concerto, the original score having been lost. It was once again performed at the Royal Albert Hall in September 1999, this time with the London Symphony Orchestra conducted by Paul Mann. The concert also included songs from each member's solo careers, as well as a short Deep Purple set, and the occasion was released as the album In Concert with The London Symphony Orchestra in 2000. 2001 saw the release of the box set The Soundboard Series, containing concerts from the 2001 Australian Tour plus two from Tokyo, Japan. Much of the next few years was spent on the road touring. The group continued forward until 2002 when founding member Lord announced his amicable retirement from the band to pursue personal projects (especially orchestral work). His departure left Ian Paice as the band's sole remaining founder member. Lord left his Hammond organ to his replacement, rock keyboard veteran Don Airey, who had helped Deep Purple out when Lord's knee was injured in 2001. Airey had previously worked with Glover (as well as Ritchie Blackmore) as a member of Rainbow from 1979 to 1982.

=== Mark VIII (2002–2022) ===
In 2003, the new Mark VIII line-up released Bananas, their first studio album in five years, and began touring in support. EMI Records refused a contract extension with Deep Purple, possibly because of lower sales.

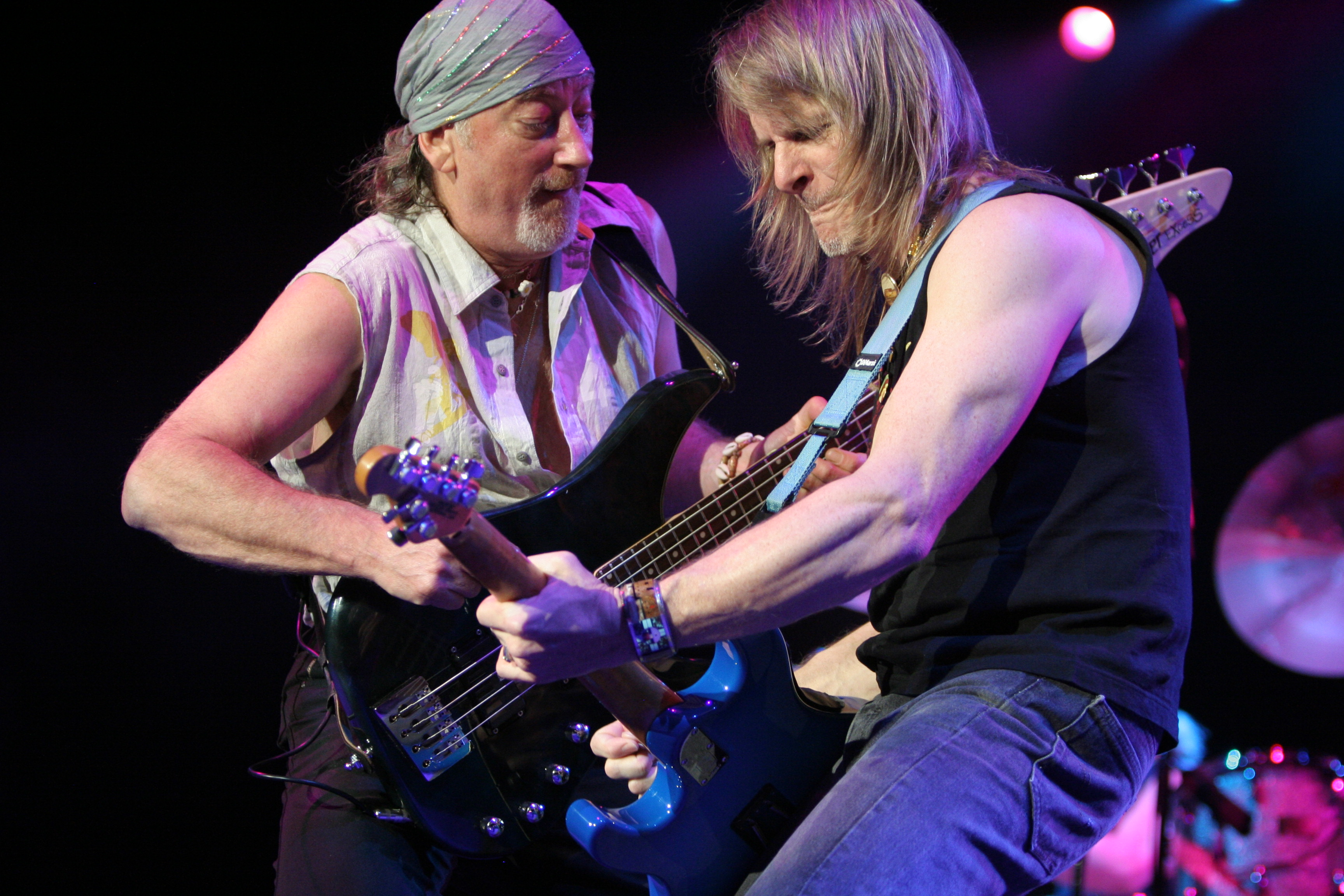
Roger Glover and Steve Morse playing the intro to "Highway Star" at the Molson Amphitheatre, Toronto, 2005

The band played at the Live 8 concert in Park Place (Barrie, Ontario) in July 2005, and in October released their next album, Rapture of the Deep, which was followed by the Rapture of the Deep tour. Both Bananas and Rapture of the Deep were produced by Michael Bradford. In 2009 Ian Gillan said, "Record sales have been steadily declining, but people are prepared to pay a lot for concert tickets." In addition, Gillan stated: "I don't think happiness comes with money."

Deep Purple did concert tours in 48 countries in 2011. The Songs That Built Rock Tour used a 38-piece orchestra, and included a performance at the O_{2} Arena in London. Until May 2011, the band members had disagreed about whether to make a new studio album, because it would not really make money any more. Roger Glover stated that Deep Purple should make a new studio album "even if it costs us money." In early 2011, David Coverdale and Glenn Hughes told VH1 they would like to reunite Mark III for the right opportunity, such as a benefit concert. This did not happen however, as Ritchie Blackmore was difficult to contact and was not interested, as he was busy with his current band Blackmore's Night. The band's chief sound engineer of nine years of tours, Moray McMillin, died in September 2011, aged 57. After a lot of songwriting sessions in Europe, Deep Purple decided to record through the summer of 2012, and the band announced they would release their new studio album in 2013. Steve Morse announced to French magazine Rock Hard that the new studio album would be produced by Bob Ezrin.

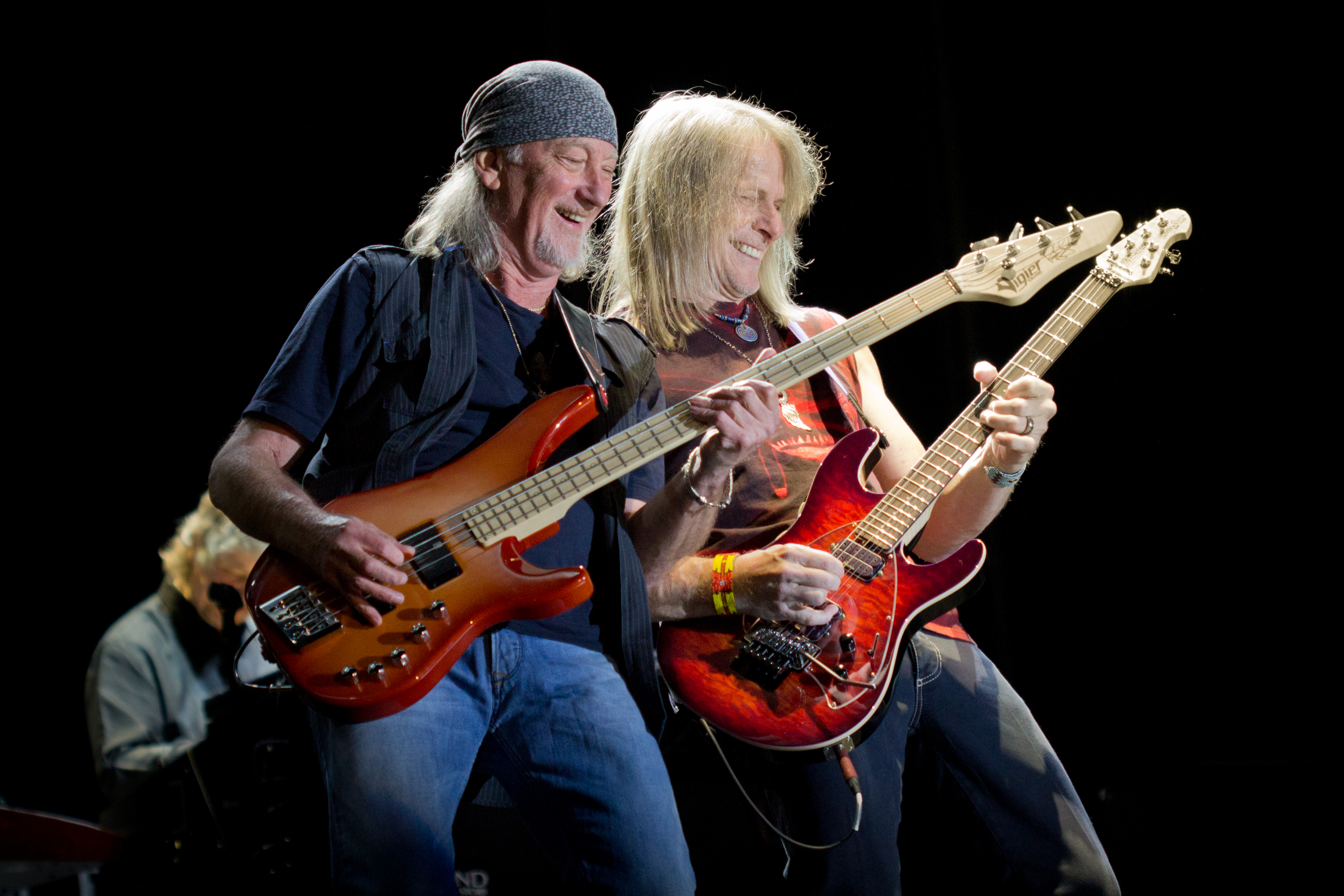
Glover and Morse in 2013 in Spain

On 16 July 2012 the band's co-founding member and former organ player, Jon Lord, died in London, aged 71. In December 2012 Roger Glover stated that the band had completed work on 14 songs for a new studio album, with 11 or 12 tracks set to appear on the final album to be released in 2013. On 26 February 2013 the title of the band's nineteenth studio album was announced as Now What?!, which was recorded and mixed in Nashville, Tennessee, and released on 26 April 2013. The album contains the track "Vincent Price", named after the horror actor who had worked with both Gillan and Glover earlier in their careers.

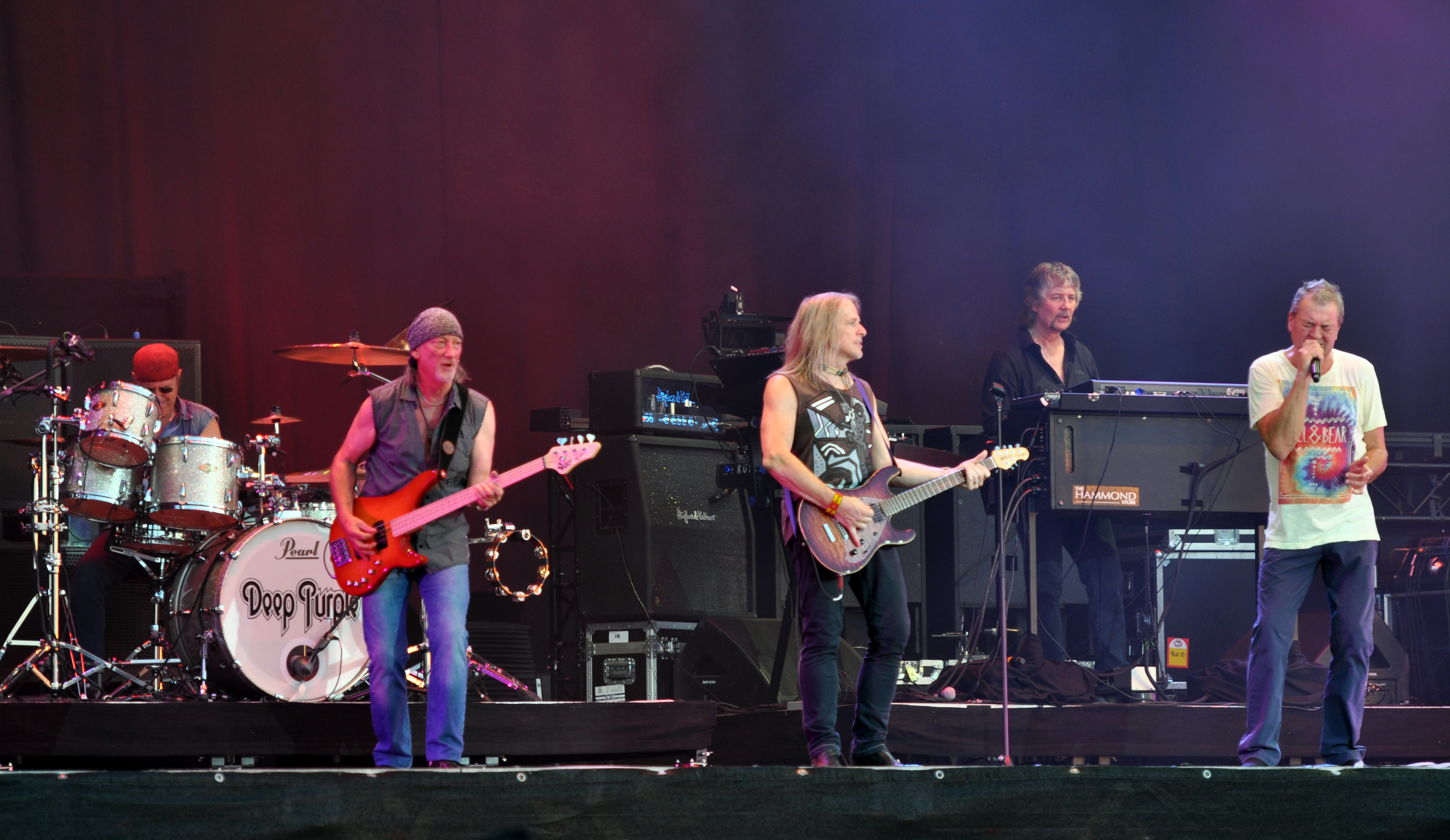
Deep Purple live at Wacken Open Air in 2013. Left to right: Ian Paice, Roger Glover, Steve Morse, Don Airey, Ian Gillan.

On 25 November 2016, Deep Purple announced Infinite as the title of their twentieth studio album, which was released on 7 April 2017. In support for the album, Deep Purple embarked on 13 May 2017 in Bucharest, Romania on The Long Goodbye Tour. At the time of the tour's announcement in December 2016, Paice told the Heavyworlds website it "may be the last big tour", adding that the band "don't know". He described the tour as being long in duration and said: "We haven't made any hard, fast plans, but it becomes obvious that you cannot tour the same way you did when you were 21. It becomes more and more difficult. People have other things in their lives, which take time. But never say never." On 3 February 2017, Deep Purple released a video version of "Time for Bedlam", the first track taken from the new album and the first new Deep Purple track for almost four years.

On 29 February 2020, a new track, "Throw My Bones" was released online, with a new album Whoosh! planned for release in June. The release of the full-length album would later be postponed to 7 August 2020 due to the COVID-19 pandemic. A review in NME said the album sounded nothing like contemporary music of 2020, but suggested that "maybe that's a good thing". Gillan confirmed in an interview on 4 August 2020 that he and the other members of Deep Purple have no immediate plans to retire.

On 6 October 2021, the band had announced the title of their covers album, Turning to Crime, which was released on 26 November 2021. Following the release of Whoosh! and Turning to Crime, Deep Purple continued touring in 2022, with dates across Europe and the US, as well as shows in Israel and Turkey.

=== Mark IX (2022–present) ===
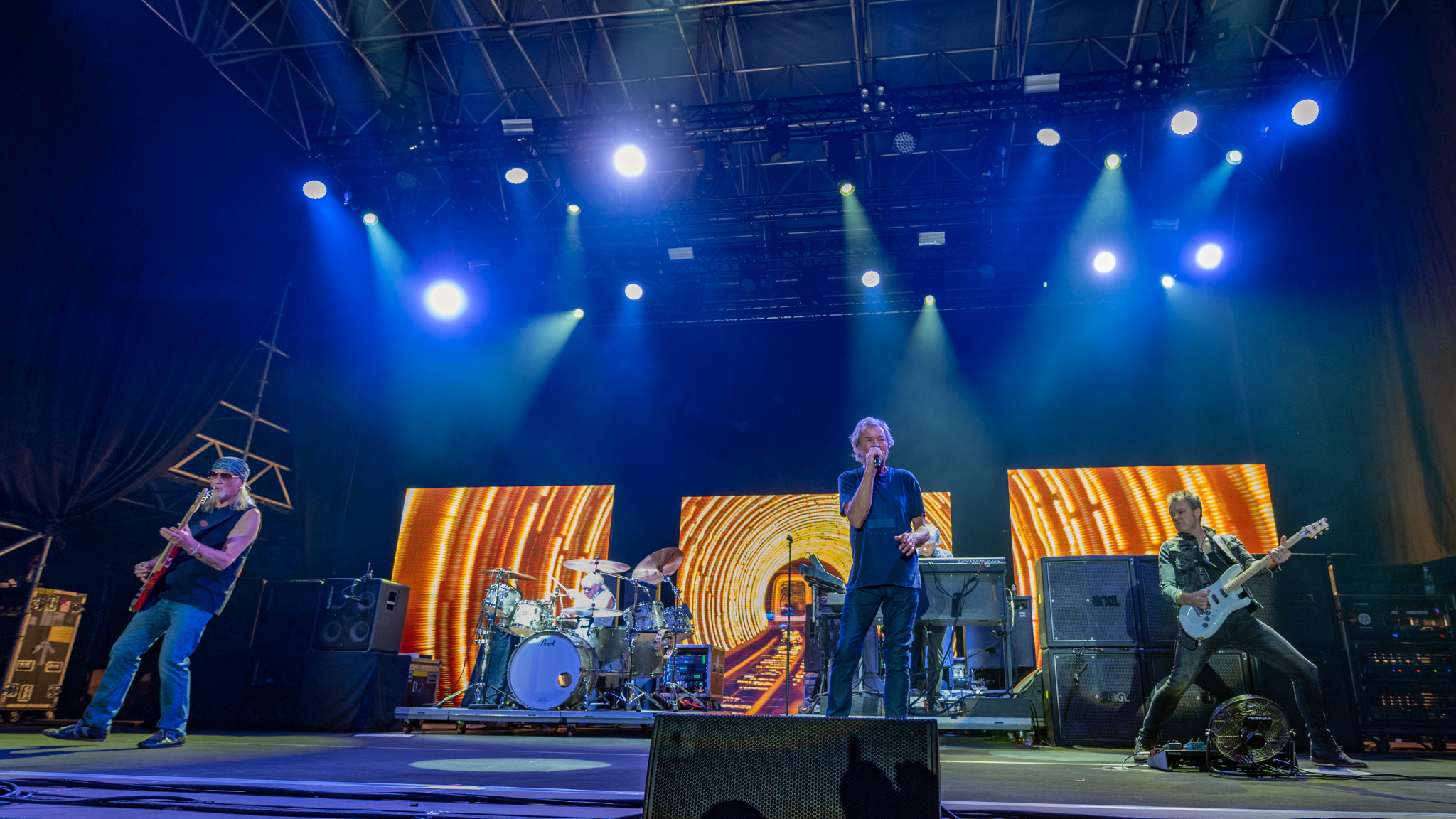
Deep Purple live in Germany, July 2022. Left to right: Roger Glover, Ian Paice, Ian Gillan, Don Airey, Simon McBride.

In March 2022, Morse announced that he had to take a hiatus from the band after his wife was diagnosed with cancer. The band, who had recently returned to live performances, continued touring with Simon McBride, formerly of Sweet Savage, standing in for Morse who at that point officially remained in the band. On 23 July 2022, it was announced that Morse would be leaving permanently in order to focus on caring for his wife as she battled cancer. Later that September, McBride was made an official member of the band.

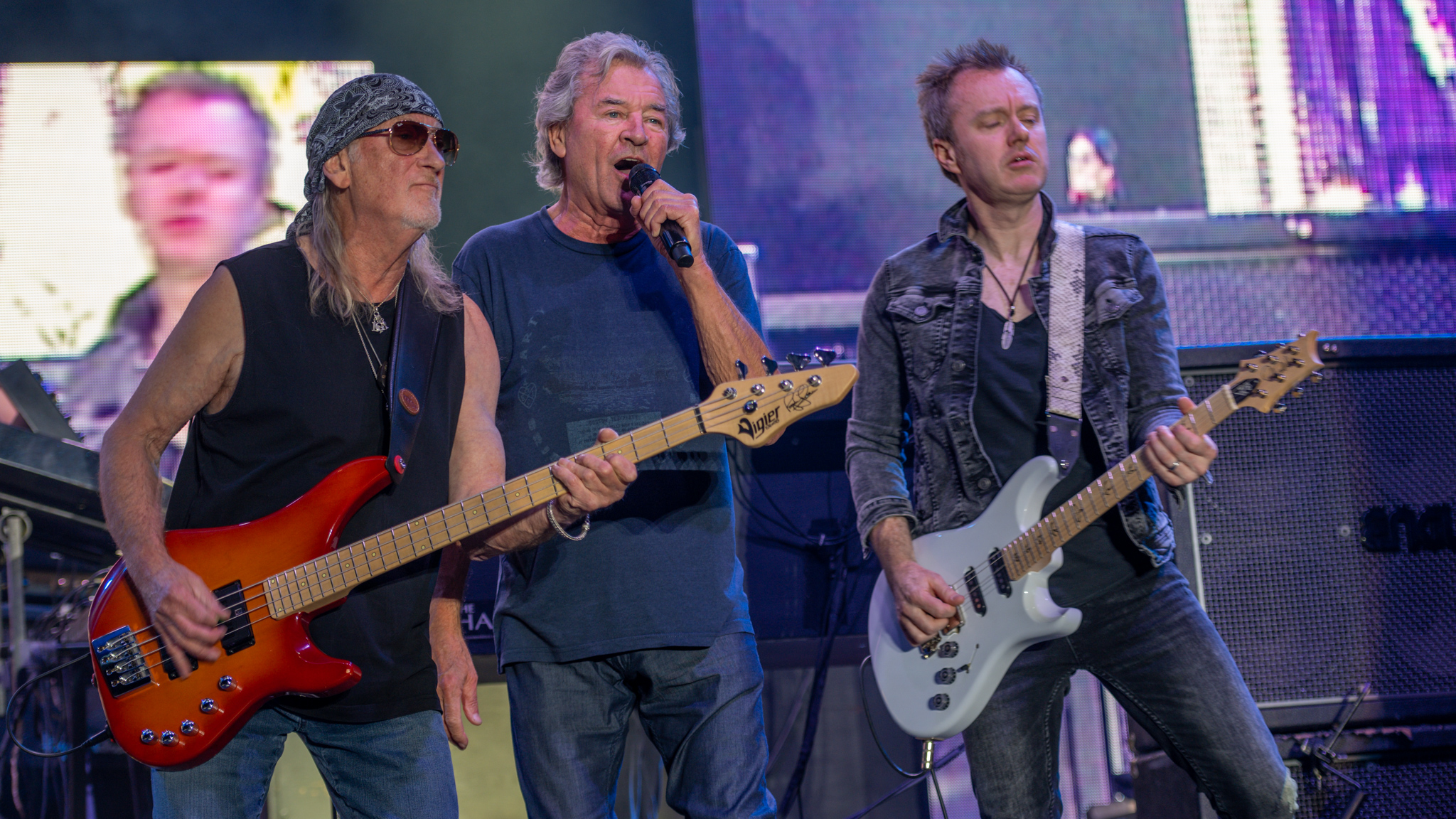
Glover, Gillan and McBride performing in 2022

In June 2022, Gillan announced that the band had planned to work on their 23rd studio album after the conclusion of the Whoosh! tour: "Deep Purple has got a writing session booked in March 2023, which I believe is to get started on thinking about our next record."

Titled =1 More Time, a 2024 tour was announced on 19 March of that year. Jefferson Starship were special guests on the Europe dates, and Reef were special guests for the UK shows. On 24 April 2024, it was announced the forthcoming release of a new studio album – the first with McBride – whose title =1 and track listing were revealed, and the release date stated as 19 July of that year. It was the fifth Deep Purple album that Bob Ezrin had produced. The first single "Portable Door" was released on 30 April. A second single, "Pictures of You", was released on 5 June 2024. A third single, "Lazy Sod" was released on 5 July 2024.

In a May 2025 interview with Rolling Stone Brasil, Paice confirmed that Deep Purple had begun working on new material for their next album due for a possible 2026 release.

In a November 2025 interview with Uncut, Gillan confirmed that he had only 30% vision and that his eyesight "won't get better". He also opened up about potentially retiring from Deep Purple: "I think if I lose my energy I'm going to stop. I don't want to be an embarrassment to anyone. We're not far off that. It creeps up on you – you don't really notice." Gillan later retracted his statement about retiring, saying that they were often looking a long way ahead, and had no plans to retire at this stage.

Deep Purple's twenty-fourth studio album, SPLAT!, was released on 3 July 2026. The band will support the album by embarking on a North American tour with 24 dates through August and September 2026, with special guests Kansas and Jefferson Starship, followed by a tour Europe in the summer (which will include an appearance at the Hellfest music festival), and then UK tour dates in November with Mammoth and Jayler.

Prior to the release of SPLAT!, Deep Purple toured Japan in April 2026. During the tour, they were received by the country's Prime Minister, Sanae Takaichi, who is a drummer and a fan of the band since childhood. During the visit, Takaichi gifted Ian Paice a pair of Japanese made drumsticks, telling the drummer, "You are my god".

In June 2026, shortly before the release of SPLAT!, Paice confirmed that the band will likely begin working on a twenty-fifth studio album in 2027.

Original guitarist Ritchie Blackmore performed with Deep Purple for the first time in 33 years at the Jones Beach Theater in Wantagh, New York on 12 August 2026, joining them for "Smoke on the Water" during the encore.

On 31 October 2026, the band announced in a Facebook post that they were unable to perform as scheduled this weekend: the very evening in Leipzig (at the QI Arena) and on Sunday evening 1 November 2026 in Hamburg (at the Sporthalle). This cancellations came as a result of the hospitalisation of lead singer Ian Gillan following a medical emergency. These shows were both due to be rescheduled.

On 2 November 2026, it was announced that following Ian Gillan's medical emergency, Deep Purple had to postpone the remainder of their tour dates in November 2026. (Note: ... that is: 3 November in Dortmund at Westfalenhalle; 4 November in Berlin at Uber Arena; 6 November in Frankfurt at Festhalle; 7 November in Nuremberg at Arena; 9 November in Amsterdam at Ziggodome; 10 November in Strasbourg at Zenith; 12 November in Bordeaux at Arkéa Arena; 13 November in Nantes at Zenith; 15 November in Lyon at LDLC Arena; 18 November in Newcastle upon Tyne at Utilita Arena; 19 November in Glasgow at OVO Hydro; 21 November in Birmingham at BP Pulse Arena; 22 November in Manchester at AO Arena; 24 November in London at Eventim Apollo; 25 November 2026 in London at Royal Albert Hall) The Latin America leg of their tour due to begin in December 2026 remains on schedule so far.

On 7 November 2026, Gillan announced that he was recovering after "successful" surgery. The exact nature of the medical emergency and the subsequent surgery has not been disclosed (yet).

== Artistry ==
Deep Purple are cited as one of the pioneers of hard rock and heavy metal, along with Led Zeppelin and Black Sabbath. The BBC states they "made up the 'unholy trinity' of British hard rock and heavy metal during the genre's 1970s golden age." RockLists.com claims that, with albums like Fireball and Machine Head, Deep Purple "helped pour the concrete for hard rock and heavy metal."

The band have spanned many subgenres of rock, including acid rock, psychedelic rock, progressive rock, blues rock and funk rock, prompting Canadian journalist Martin Popoff to call the band "a reference point of a genre in metal without categorisation." Jason Ankeny of AllMusic said the band "made hard rock a fine art, and unleashed some of the greatest guitar riffs known to the world."

=== Musical style ===
"My interest in classical music overall is what led me in the direction of trying to combine blues, rock and classical ideas into the stylistic statement."

— Ritchie Blackmore on early influences on Deep Purple

Deep Purple's members were experienced musicians with different musical backgrounds: Lord had trained in classical music and played in jazz and blues rock ensembles, Blackmore and Simper came from session work in pop rock and Paice and Evans came from beat bands. This is evident on the band's debut album, Shades of Deep Purple, a contemporary mix of psychedelic rock, progressive rock and pop rock.

Traces of the heavier sound that Deep Purple popularised in their Mark II line-up can be heard in the remaining albums by Mark I, mostly evident in Blackmore's guitar parts. Evans was replaced by Ian Gillan, initially influenced by Elvis Presley and similarly had roots in psychedelia and pop rock, as vocalist for Episode Six with bassist Roger Glover, who replaced Simper. The first three Mark II studio albums have continued to attract critical praise as key early examples of the hard rock and heavy metal genres, while Who Do We Think We Are showed a move to a more blues-based sound, even featuring scat singing.

Certain songs from the Mark II line-up, such as "Speed King", "Hard Lovin' Man", "Fireball" and "Highway Star", have been credited as early influences on speed metal and thrash metal. The latter song was called "early speed metal" by Robb Reiner of Canadian heavy metal band Anvil. "Hard Lovin' Man" has been referred to as the "first proto-thrash song ever", predating Queen's "Stone Cold Crazy" and Black Sabbath's "Symptom of the Universe" by a few years. Deep Purple have also experimented with funk and soul, mostly in the mid-1970s, but as recently as "One Night in Vegas" (2017), which has been described as funk metal.

=== Influences ===
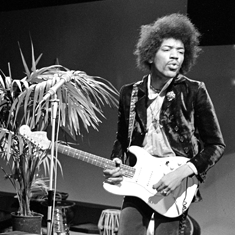
Jimi Hendrix was a major influence on Deep Purple

According to Ritchie Blackmore, he was inspired by the Allman Brothers Band, Vanilla Fudge and Cream, but credits Jimi Hendrix as "the real deal for him and Deep Purple" and praising him as "at least 20 years ahead of his time." Hendrix's songs, "Stone Free" and "Fire", were the inspirations for "Speed King". Blackmore had the chance to meet Hendrix at Whisky a Go Go in Hollywood, but they did not talk, he told SiriusXM's Guitar Greats in 2022.

Mountain was another major influence on Blackmore. After touring with them, Deep Purple was shocked by how heavy their sound was with just three members, making them want to pursue a heavier sound on Deep Purple In Rock. "I really loved Leslie West's playing, said Blackmore before reflecting on the first time hearing "Mississippi Queen".

"I remember being in a place in Germany, and Ian [Paice] and I were out drinking together. In those days, you could go to a club and listen to the new records in their entirety that had just come out. Paice and I heard, 'Mississippi Queen', and we both went white! We were thinking, 'Who the hell is that?!' It had such a big sound! For three guys, it was incredibly heavy."

Other members of Deep Purple have credited Jimmy Smith, Buddy Rich, Elvis Presley, Little Richard, Chuck Berry, Fats Domino, Ella Fitzgerald, Jerry Lee Lewis, Bob Dylan, Buddy Holly Jimmy McGriff, the Beatles, Crosby, Stills, Nash & Young, Free, the Who, Traffic, Neil Young, Stevie Wonder, David Bowie and Jeff Buckley as influences.

== Legacy and influence ==
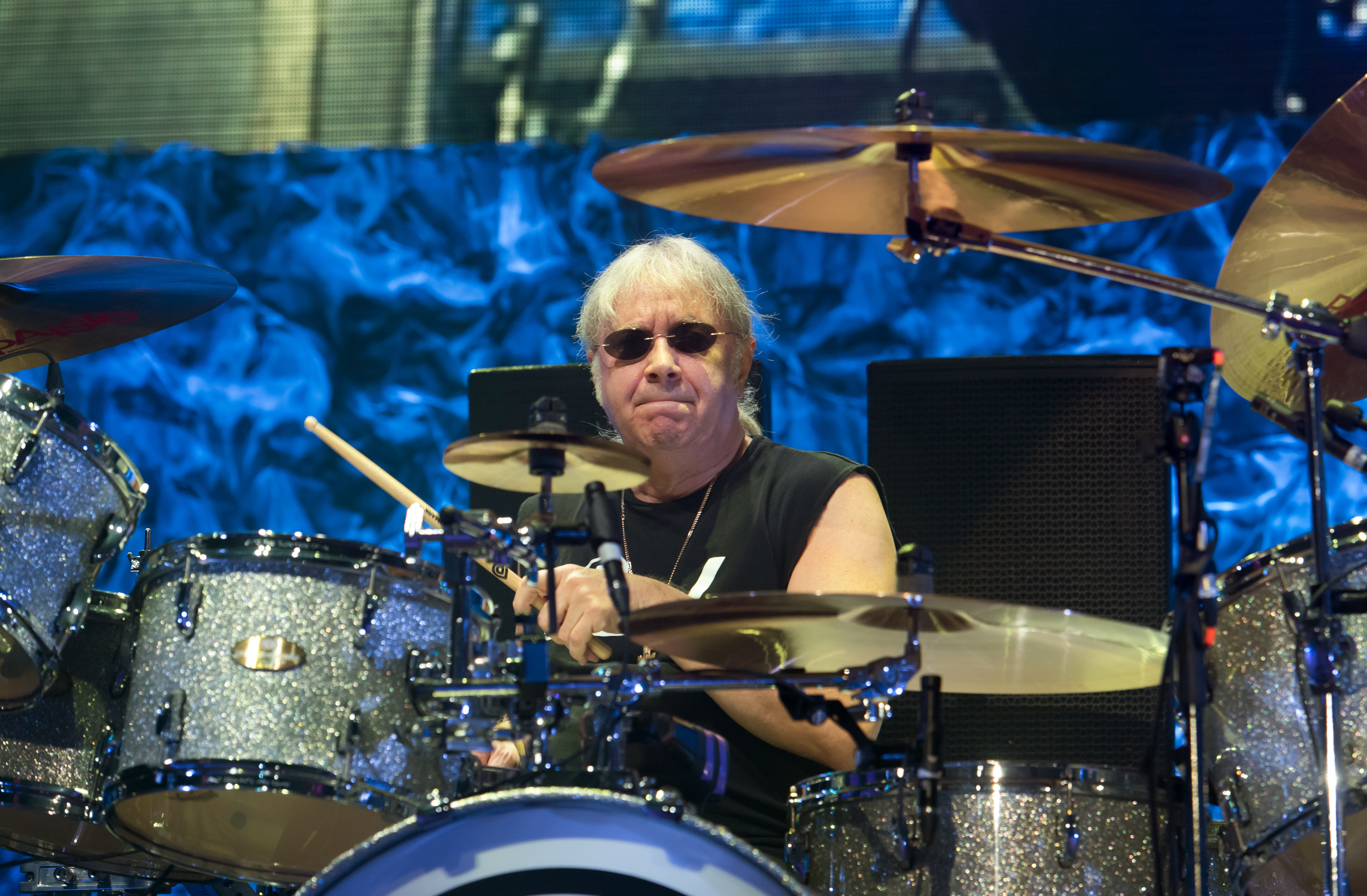
Ian Paice (pictured in 2017). Ranked number 21 in Rolling Stone's 100 Greatest Drummers list, his magazine entry states, "without Deep Purple's only continuous member, there would be no heavy metal drumming."

Deep Purple have influenced a number of rock and metal acts including Accept, Aerosmith, Alice in Chains, Anthrax, Anvil, Blue Öyster Cult, Bon Jovi, Candlemass, Cannibal Corpse, Carcass, Cathedral, Celtic Frost, the Charlatans, Def Leppard, Dinosaur Jr., Dio, Dokken, Dream Theater, Europe, Exciter, Exodus, Fates Warning, Lita Ford, Heart, Helloween, Iron Maiden, Judas Priest, King's X, Kingdom Come, Kiss, London, Yngwie Malmsteen, Megadeth, the Melvins, Mercyful Fate, Metallica, Ministry, Mötley Crüe, Motörhead, Night Ranger, Opeth, Overkill, Pantera, Prong, Queen, Queensrÿche, Rage Against the Machine, Rush, Saxon, Scorpions, Sepultura, Slayer, the Smashing Pumpkins, Soundgarden, Stryper, Stuck Mojo, Testament, Triumph, UFO, Van Halen, Venom, Winger, Wolfmother, and Y&T.

Def Leppard vocalist Joe Elliot stated that "in 1971, there were only three bands that mattered: Led Zeppelin, Black Sabbath, and Deep Purple." Iron Maiden's bassist and primary songwriter, Steve Harris, states that his band's "heaviness" was inspired by "Black Sabbath and Deep Purple with a bit of Zeppelin thrown in." Van Halen founder Eddie Van Halen named "Burn" one of his favourite ever guitar riffs. Queen guitarist Brian May referred to Ritchie Blackmore as "a trail blazer and technically incredible — unpredictable in every possible way...you never knew what you were gonna see when you went to see Purple." Metallica drummer Lars Ulrich states, "When I was nine years old it was all about Deep Purple. My all time favourite [album] is still Made in Japan." The band's 1974 album Stormbringer was the first record owned by Till Lindemann, vocalist of German Neue Deutsche Härte band Rammstein.

Although Deep Purple helped lay the foundation for the heavy metal, their consummate musicianship meant they also transcended the genre. Indeed, they began as a progressive rock group with their eyes, unusually, on the singles market. Yet they certainly rocked, as their shows from the earliest days conclusively proved.

— David Roberts in the book Rock Chronicles: Every Legend. Every Line-up. Every Look. (published October 25, 2019) Firefly Books. p. 148.

In 2000, Deep Purple were ranked number 22 on VH1's "100 Greatest Artists of Hard Rock" programme. At the 2008 World Music Awards, the band received the Legend Award. In 2011, they received the Innovator Award at the 2011 Classic Rock Awards in London. A Rolling Stone readers' poll in 2012 ranked Made in Japan the sixth best live album of all time.

As part of the 40th anniversary celebrations of Machine Head (1972), Re-Machined: A Tribute to Deep Purple's Machine Head was released in 2012. This tribute album included Iron Maiden, Metallica, Steve Vai, Carlos Santana, The Flaming Lips, Black Label Society, Papa Roach vocalist Jacoby Shaddix, Chickenfoot (former Van Halen members Sammy Hagar and Michael Anthony, guitarist Joe Satriani and Chad Smith of Red Hot Chili Peppers) and the supergroup Kings of Chaos (Def Leppard vocalist Joe Elliott, Steve Stevens, and former Guns N' Roses members Duff McKagan and Matt Sorum).

In 2007, Deep Purple were one of the featured artists in the fourth episode of the BBC/VH1 series Seven Ages of Rock – an episode focusing on heavy metal. In May 2019 the group received the Ivor Novello Award for International Achievement from the British Academy of Songwriters, Composers, and Authors.

=== Rock and Roll Hall of Fame ===
Before October 2012, Deep Purple had never been nominated for induction into the Rock and Roll Hall of Fame (though they had been eligible since 1993), but were nominated for induction in 2012 and 2013. Despite ranking second in the public's vote on the Rock Hall fans' ballot, which had over half a million votes, they were not inducted by the Rock Hall committee. Kiss bassist Gene Simmons and Rush bassist Geddy Lee commented that Deep Purple should obviously be among the Rock and Roll Hall of Fame inductees. There have been criticisms in the past over Deep Purple not having been inducted. Toto guitarist Steve Lukather commented, "they put Patti Smith in there but not Deep Purple? What's the first song every kid learns how to play? ["Smoke on the Water"] ... And they're not in the Rock and Roll Hall of Fame? ... the Rock and Roll Hall of Fame has lost its cool because of the glaring omissions." Guns N' Roses and Velvet Revolver guitarist Slash expressed his surprise and disagreement regarding the non-induction of Deep Purple: "The list of people who haven't even been nominated is mind-boggling ... [the] big one for me is Deep Purple. How could you not induct Deep Purple?". Metallica band members James Hetfield, Lars Ulrich and Kirk Hammett had also lobbied for the band's induction.

In an interview with Rolling Stone in April 2014, Ulrich pleaded: "I'm not going to get into the politics or all that stuff, but I got two words to say: 'Deep Purple'. That's all I have to say: Deep Purple. Seriously, people, Deep Purple. Two simple words in the English language ... 'Deep Purple'! Did I say that already?" In 2015, Chris Jericho, professional wrestler and vocalist of rock band Fozzy, stated: "that Deep Purple are not in it [Hall of Fame]. It's bullshit. Obviously there's some politics against them from getting in there."

"With almost no exceptions, every hard rock band in the last 40 years, including mine, traces its lineage directly back to Black Sabbath, Led Zeppelin and Deep Purple. Where I grew up, and in the rest of the world outside of North America, all were equal in status, stature and influence. So in my heart – and I know I speak for many of my fellow musicians and millions of Purple fans when I confess that – I am somewhat bewildered that they are so late in getting in the Rock and Roll Hall of Fame."

— Excerpt from Lars Ulrich's speech, inducting Deep Purple into the Rock & Roll Hall of Fame.

In response to these, a Hall of Fame chief executive said, "The definition of 'rock and roll' means different things to different people, but as broad as the classifications may be, they all share a common love of the music." Roger Glover got an inside word in there and they were talking of us as not "fashionable" enough. "One of the jurors said, 'You know, Deep Purple, they're just one-hit wonders.' How can you deal with that kind of Philistinism, you know?".

Ian Gillan also commented, "I've fought all my life against being institutionalised and I think you have to actively search these things out, in other words mingle with the right people, and we don't get invited to those kind of things." On 16 October 2013 Deep Purple were again announced as nominees for inclusion to the Hall, and once again they were not inducted.

In April 2015, Deep Purple topped the list in a Rolling Stone readers poll of acts that should be inducted into the Hall of Fame in 2016. In October 2015, the band were nominated for induction for the third time. In December 2015, the band were announced as 2016 inductees into the Hall of Fame, with the Hall stating: "Deep Purple's non-inclusion in the Hall is a gaping hole which must now be filled", adding that along with fellow inductees Led Zeppelin and Black Sabbath, the band make up "the Holy Trinity of hard rock and metal bands."

The band were officially inducted on 8 April 2016. The Hall of Fame announced that the following members were included as inductees: Ian Paice, Jon Lord, Ritchie Blackmore, Roger Glover, Ian Gillan, Rod Evans, David Coverdale and Glenn Hughes. Excluded from induction were Nick Simper, Tommy Bolin, Joe Lynn Turner, Joe Satriani, Steve Morse and Don Airey.

It was reported that Ian Gillan announced that he was barring Hughes, Coverdale, Evans and Blackmore from playing with them onstage, as these members are not in the current "living, breathing" version of the band. When interviewed by Loudwire he stated however that this was not the case. An email was sent from his management to Blackmore's management but Blackmore claimed he never received said email. Of the seven living inducted members, five showed up. Blackmore did not attend; a posting on his Facebook page claimed he was honoured by the induction and had considered attending, until he received correspondence from Bruce Payne, manager from the current touring version of Deep Purple saying, "No!" Evans, who had disappeared from the music scene more than three decades prior, also did not appear. Since Lord had died in 2012, his widow Vickie accepted his award on his behalf. The current members of the band played "Highway Star" for the opening performance. After a brief interlude playing the Booker T. & the M.G.'s song "Green Onions" while photos of the late Jon Lord flashed on the screen behind them, the current Deep Purple members played two more songs: "Hush" and their signature tune "Smoke on the Water". Although barred from playing with Deep Purple, both David Coverdale and Glenn Hughes (as well as Roger Glover) joined fellow inductees Cheap Trick and an all-star cast to perform a cover of the Fats Domino song "Ain't That a Shame".

== Band members ==
Current members

- Ian Paice – drums (1968–1976, 1984–present)
- Roger Glover – bass, keyboards (1969–1973, 1984–present)
- Ian Gillan – lead vocals, harmonica, percussion (1969–1973, 1984–1989, 1992–present)
- Don Airey – keyboards (2002–present)
- Simon McBride – guitars, backing vocals (2022–present)
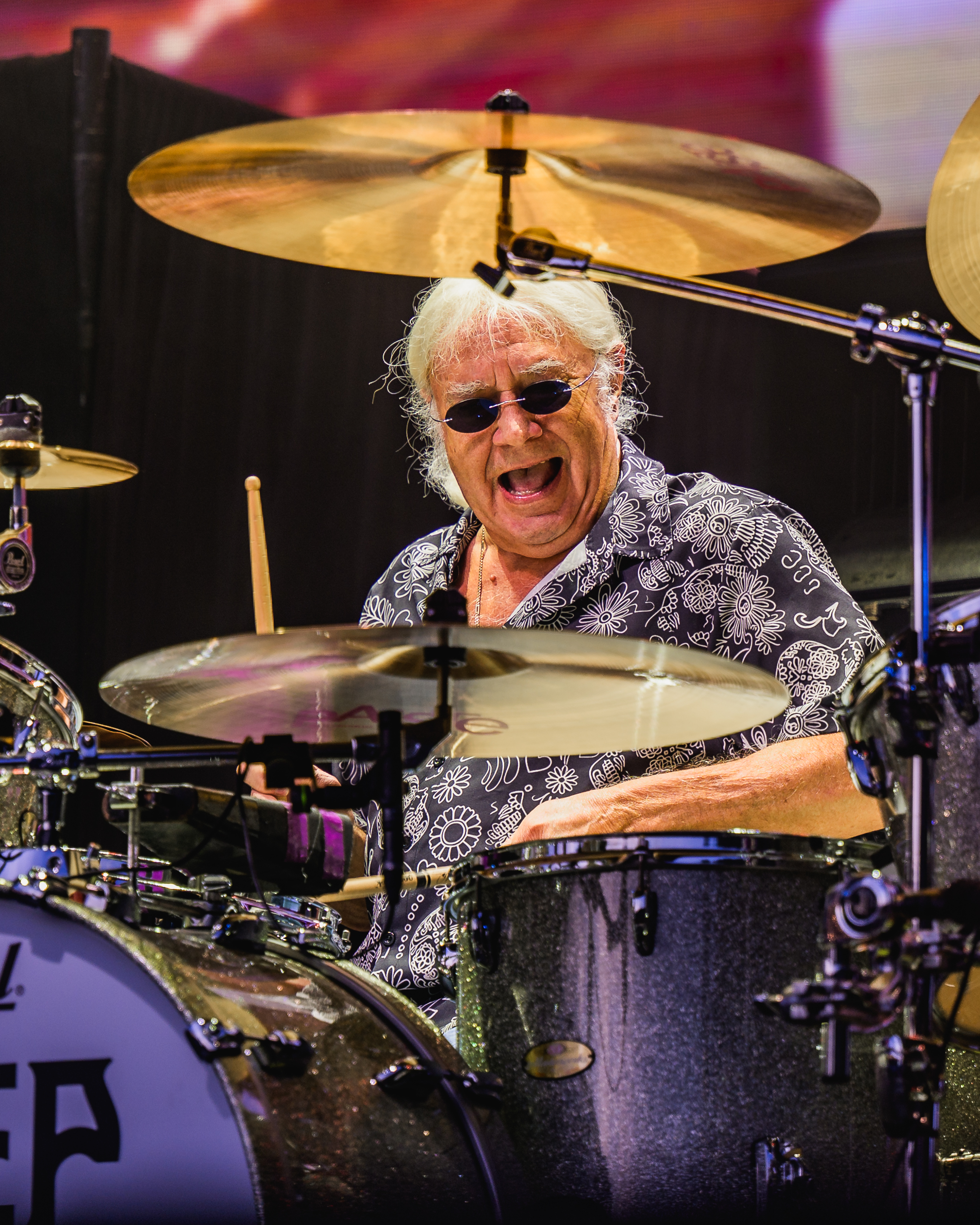
Ian Paice (2026)

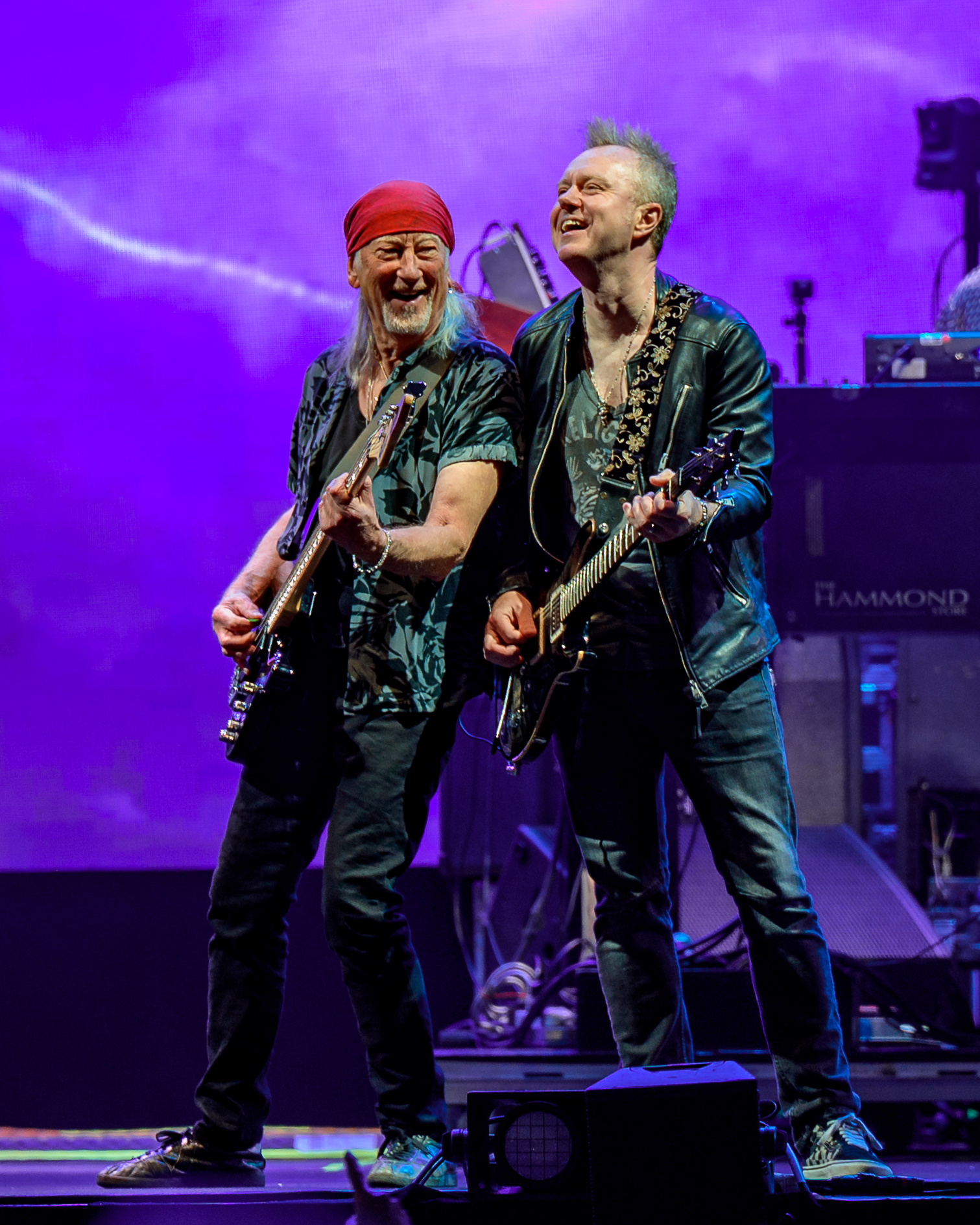
Roger Glover and Simon McBride (2026)

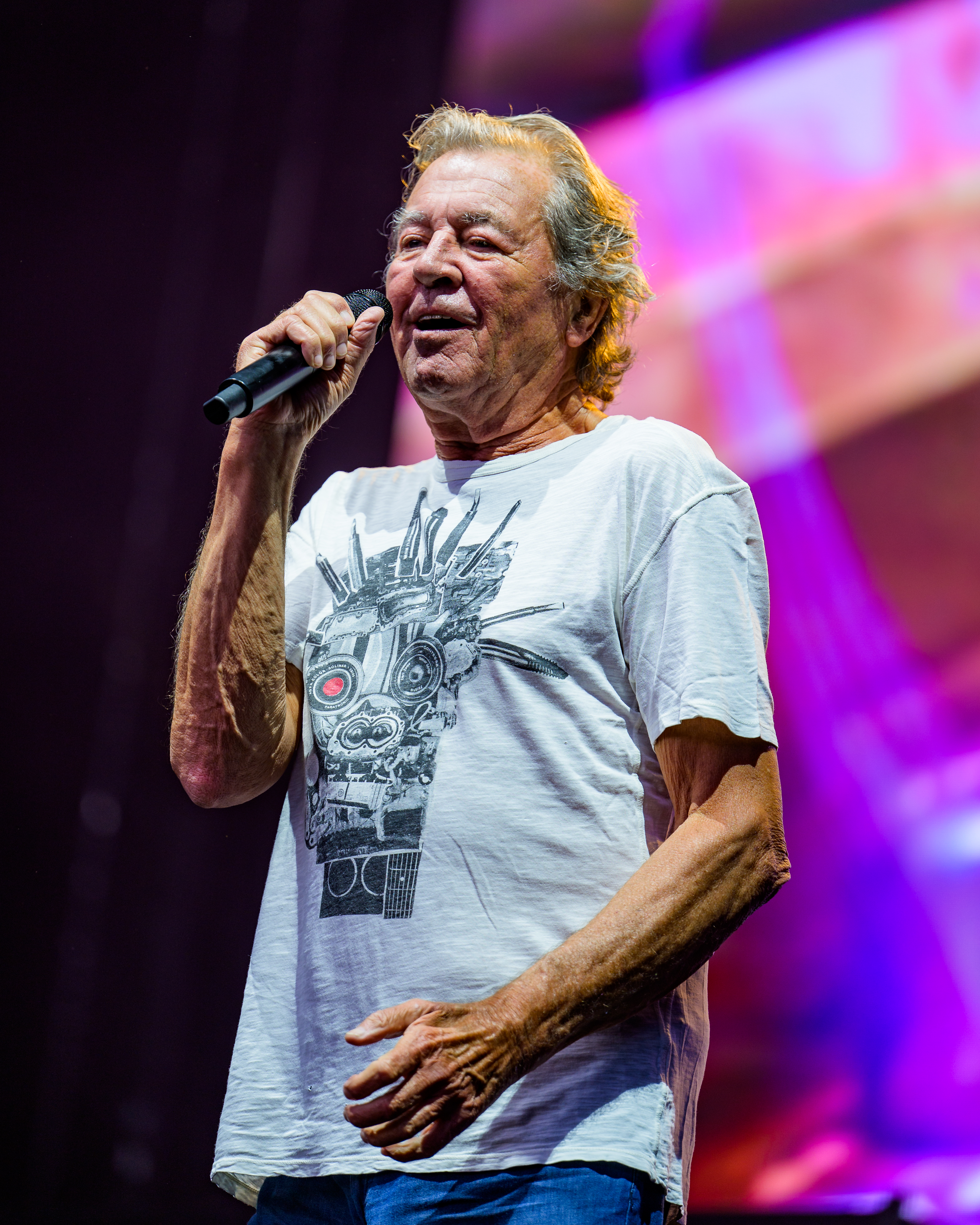
Ian Gillan (2026)

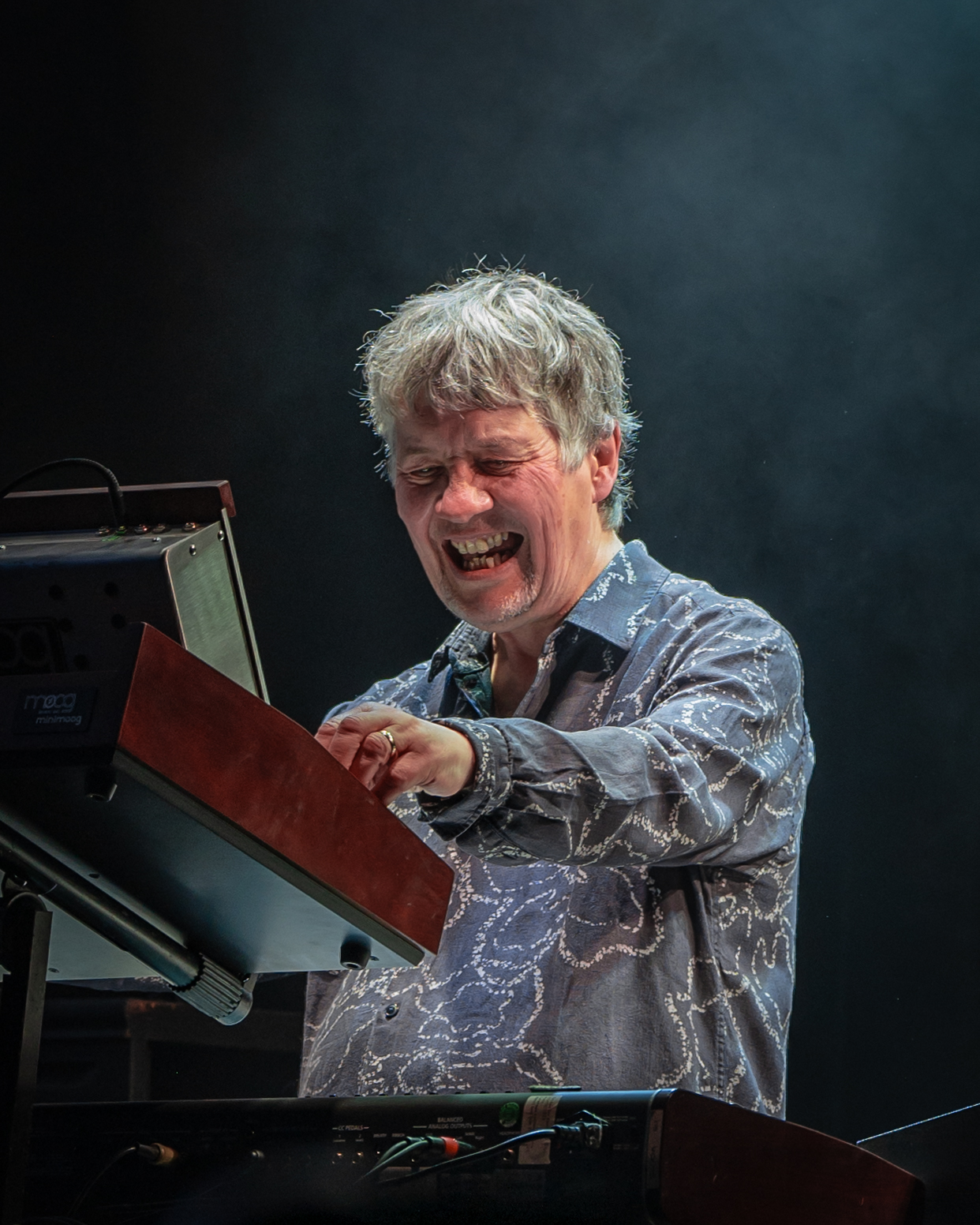
Don Airey (2024)

== Concert tours ==
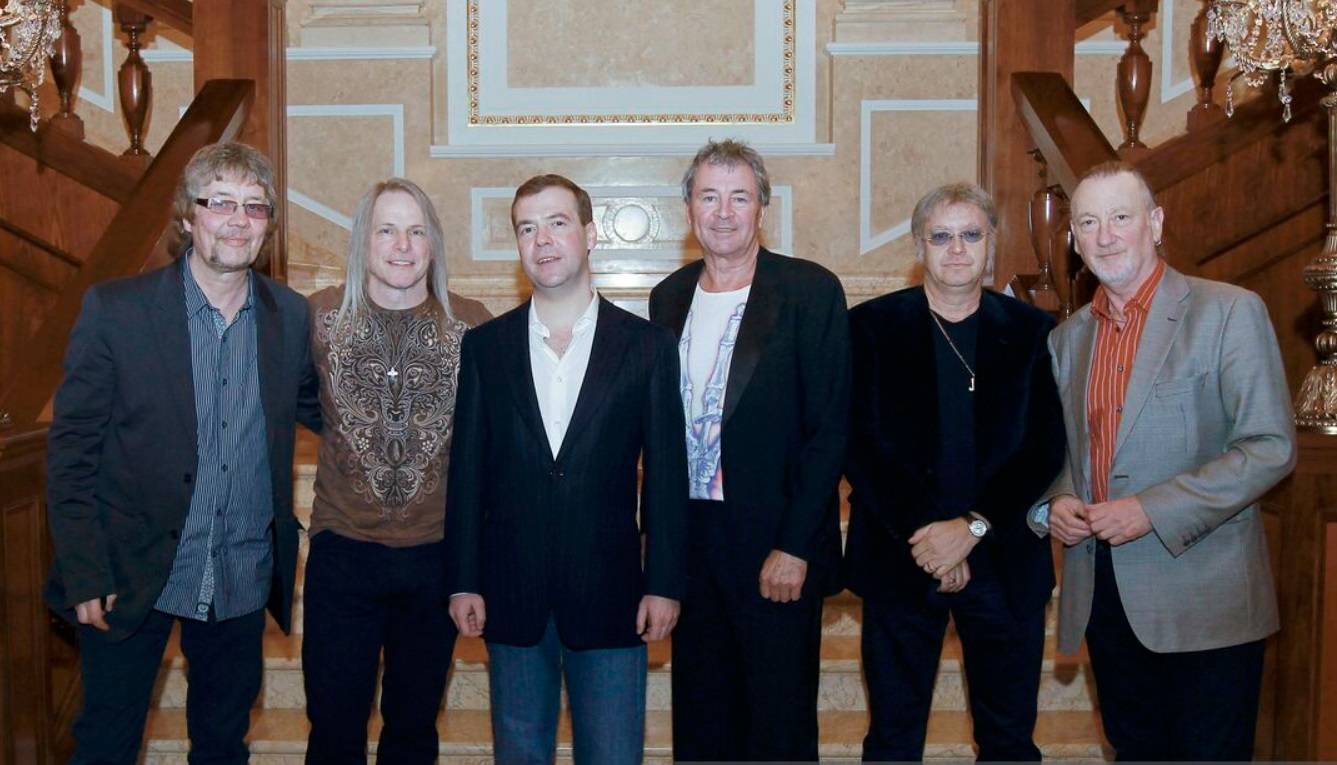
Deep Purple with then-Russian President Dmitry Medvedev in 2011

Deep Purple are considered to be one of the hardest touring bands in the world. They have toured the world since 1968 (with the exception of their 1976–1984 split). In 2007, the band received a special award for selling more than 150,000 tickets in France, with 40 dates in the country in 2007 alone. Also in 2007, Deep Purple's Rapture of the Deep tour was voted number 6 concert tour of the year (in all music genres) by Planet Rock listeners. The Rolling Stones' A Bigger Bang tour was voted number 5 and beat Purple's tour by only 1%. Deep Purple released a new live compilation DVD box, Around the World Live, in May 2008. In February 2008, the band made their first-ever appearance at the State Kremlin Palace in Moscow, Russia at the personal request of Dmitry Medvedev who at the time was a chairman of the state owned Gazprom company, which sponsored the concert, and who was considered a shoo-in for the seat of the Presidency of Russia. Prior to that, Deep Purple has toured Russia several times starting as early as 1996 but has not been considered to have played such a significant venue previously. The band was part of the entertainment for the FIS Nordic World Ski Championships 2009 in Liberec, the Czech Republic. On March 30, 2026 Deep Purple announced a North American tour with 24 dates through August & September 2026, with special guests Kansas and Jefferson Starship.

- Deep Purple Debut Tour (1968)
- Shades of Deep Purple Tour (1968)
- The Book of Taliesyn Tour (1968–1969)
- Deep Purple European Tour, (1969–1970)
- In Rock World Tour (1970–1971)
- Fireball World Tour (1971–1972)
- Machine Head World Tour (1972–1973)
- Deep Purple European Tour (1973–1974)
- Burn World Tour (1974)
- Stormbringer World Tour (1974–1975)
- Come Taste The Band World Tour (1975–1976)
- Perfect Strangers Tour (1984–1985)
- The House of Blue Light World Tour (1987–1988)
- Slaves and Masters World Tour (1991)
- Deep Purple 25 Years Anniversary World Tour (1993)
- Deep Purple and Joe Satriani Tour (1993–1994)
- Deep Purple Secret Mexican Tour (1994)
- Deep Purple Secret USA Tour (1994–1995)
- Deep Purple Asian & African Tour (1995)
- Purpendicular World Tour (1996–1997)
- A Band on World Tour (1998–1999)
- Concerto World Tour (2000–2001)
- Deep Purple World Tour (2001–2003)
- Bananas World Tour (2003–2005)
- Rapture of the Deep tour (2006–2011)
- The Songs That Built Rock Tour (2011–2012)
- Now What? World Tour (2013–2015)
- World Tour 2016 (2016)
- The Long Goodbye Tour (2017–2019)
- Whoosh! Tour (2022–2023)
- =1 More Time Tour (2024)
- SPLAT! World Tour (2026)

== Discography ==
Studio albums

- Shades of Deep Purple (1968)
- The Book of Taliesyn (1968)
- Deep Purple (1969)
- Deep Purple in Rock (1970)
- Fireball (1971)
- Machine Head (1972)
- Who Do We Think We Are (1973)
- Burn (1974)
- Stormbringer (1974)
- Come Taste the Band (1975)
- Perfect Strangers (1984)
- The House of Blue Light (1987)
- Slaves and Masters (1990)
- The Battle Rages On... (1993)
- Purpendicular (1996)
- Abandon (1998)
- Bananas (2003)
- Rapture of the Deep (2005)
- Now What?! (2013)
- Infinite (2017)
- Whoosh! (2020)
- Turning to Crime (2021)
- =1 (2024)
- SPLAT! (2026)
