= Splat! (album) =

Studio album by Deep Purple
- Released: 3 July 2026
- Studios: The Sound (Nashville); Noble Street (Toronto); Headline Music (Harston); SMB; Chameleon (Hamburg)
- Genres: Hard rock; heavy metal; progressive rock
- Length: 50:24
- Label: earMusic
- Producer: Bob Ezrin

Deep Purple chronology
=1 (2024)	Splat! (2026)

Singles from Splat!
- 1. "Arrogant Boy" Released: 12 May 2026; 2. "Diablo" Released: 5 June 2026; 3. "Guilt Trippin'" Released: 23 June 2026

SPLAT! is the 24th studio album by English hard rock band Deep Purple, released on 3 July 2026. It is the band's sixth collaboration with producer Bob Ezrin, who has produced every Deep Purple album since Now What?! (2013), and their second album with guitarist Simon McBride, following =1 (2024).

== Composition and lyrics ==
Described as "the heaviest Deep Purple album in many years" by the band, SPLAT! is a hard rock, heavy metal and progressive rock album, combining the blues influence of their Mark II output with the more mature songwriting of its predecessor, =1. For the first time Deep Purple used amp modelers instead of tube amps, with McBride comparing the album to a "freight train."

A pseudo-concept album, Splat!'s lyrics explore an end-of-humanity concept. "Not in any crude apocalyptic sense but as a metamorphosis beyond physical existence," lead vocalist Ian Gillan explains in the liner notes.

The song Guilt Trippin' was written from the perspective of God and Charles Darwin in reflective conversation regarding the seemingly bleak fate of the world, and which of the two is most to blame. The song features Gillan's original screaming vocal style of delivery, which had not been used for a number years.

== Singles ==
- The lead single "Arrogant Boy" was released on 12 May 2026, along with an accompanying music video.
- The second single "Diablo" was released on 5 June 2026, along with an accompanying music video releasing on 7th June 2026.
- The third and last pre-release single "Guilt Trippin" was released on 23 June 2026 with an accompanying music video. It's also the first single to get a physical release on CD and 12" vinyl, backed by live versions of "Portable Door" and "Anya" recorded in Dresden 2024.
- The title track, "Splat!" was released as a single alongside a music video on 22 October, with physical releases (with 2026 Montreux live recordings of "Guinnesis" and "Scrib'lin Gib'rish") to follow on 29 January, 2027.

== Critical reception ==
Professional ratings
Review scores
Source	Rating
Clash	7/10
Classic Rock	4/5 stars
Record Collector	4/5 stars

According to the review aggregator Metacritic, Splat! received "generally favorable reviews" based on a weighted average score of 79 out of 100 from four critic scores. The review aggregator gave it a weighted average score of 6.9 out of 10 from five critic scores.

== Track listing ==
All songs written by Don Airey, Ian Gillan, Roger Glover, Simon McBride, and Ian Paice.

1. "Arrogant Boy" – 3:18
2. "Diablo" – 3:16 (Vinyl & Japanese CD 4:00)
3. "The Rider" – 3:56
4. "The Lunatic" – 3:47
5. "The Only Horse in Town" – 4:41
6. "Sacred Land" – 3:32
7. "The Beating of Wings" – 4:00
8. "Guilt Trippin'" – 4:52
9. "Scriblin' Gib'rish" – 3:34
10. "Jessica's Bra" – 3:45
11. "Third Call" – 4:19
12. "My New Movie" – 3:45
13. "Splat!" – 3:39

Japanese bonus track

14. "Highway Star" (live in Dresden) – 6:27

== Personnel ==
Personnel adapted from Splat! liner notes.

Deep Purple

- Ian Gillan – vocals
- Simon McBride – guitars
- Roger Glover – bass guitar
- Don Airey – keyboards
- Ian Paice – drums

Additional musicians

- Keith Urban – guitar on "Diablo"
- Bob Ezrin – background vocals

Technical personnel

- Bob Ezrin – production, mixing, additional arrangements
- Justin Cortelyou – engineering (Nashville)
- Anthony Yordanov – additional recording engineering (Toronto), mix engineering
- Tate Sablatura – additional engineering
- Jake Smith-Rex – additional engineering
- Piers Mortimer – additional keyboard recording engineering (Harston)
- Simon McBride – additional guitar recording engineering (SMB)
- Eike Freese – additional vocal recording engineering (Hamburg)
- Denny Meißner – additional vocal recording engineering (Hamburg)
- Julian Shank – mix engineering
- Robert Vosgien – mastering

== Charts ==
Chart performance for Splat!
Chart (2026)	Peak position
Australian Albums (ARIA)	19
Austrian Albums (Ö3 Austria)	2
Belgian Albums (Ultratop Flanders)	7
Belgian Albums (Ultratop Wallonia)	6
Croatian International Albums (HDU)	28
Czech Albums (ČNS IFPI)	60
Danish Albums (Hitlisten)	16
Dutch Albums (Album Top 100)	13
Finnish Albums (Suomen virallinen lista)	3
French Albums (SNEP)	28
French Rock & Metal Albums (SNEP)	2
German Albums (Offizielle Top 100)	3
German Rock & Metal Albums (Offizielle Top 100)	1
Hungarian Albums (MAHASZ)	4
Irish Independent Albums (IRMA)	14
Italian Albums (FIMI)	21
Japanese Albums (Oricon)	47
Japanese Rock Albums (Oricon)	5
Japanese Top Albums Sales (Billboard Japan)	47
Norwegian Albums (IFPI Norge)	9
Norwegian Rock Albums (IFPI Norge)	2
Polish Albums (ZPAV)	3
Scottish Albums (Official Charts)	3
Spanish Albums (Promusicae)	40
Swedish Albums (Sverigetopplistan)	3
Swedish Hard Rock Albums (Sverigetopplistan)	1
Swiss Albums (Schweizer Hitparade)	2
UK Albums (Official Charts)	12
UK Independent Albums (Official Charts)	1
UK Rock & Metal Albums (Official Charts)	1
US Top Album Sales (Billboard)	10
