= Simon McBride =

Northern Irish singer and guitarist (born 1979)

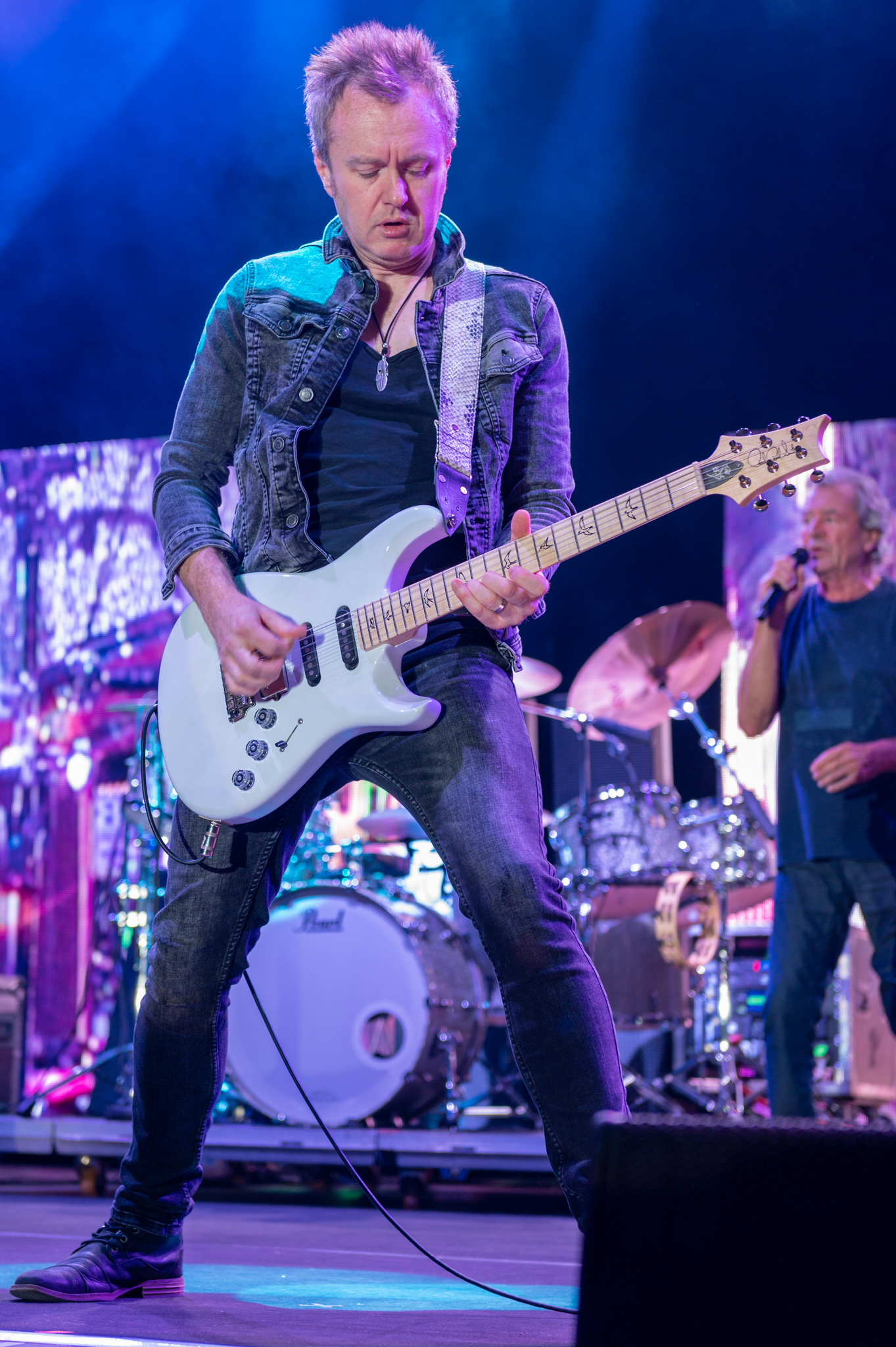
- McBride performing with Deep Purple in 2022

Background information
- Born: 9 April 1979 (age 47); Belfast, Northern Ireland
- Genres: Blues rock; hard rock; heavy metal
- Occupations: Singer; musician; songwriter; producer; educator
- Instruments: Guitar; vocals
- Years active: 1994–present
- Member of: Deep Purple; Snakecharmer; Don Airey Band
- Formerly of: Sweet Savage

Simon McBride (born 9 April 1979) is a Northern Irish singer and guitarist, who has played with other artists, including Deep Purple and Snakecharmer, as well as recording and touring his own band, and teaching at BIMM in Dublin.

He was announced as Deep Purple’s permanent replacement for Steve Morse on 16 September 2022 after covering for him in concerts earlier in the year.

== Career ==
McBride started playing the guitar when he was nine. "I was born myself into a house of rock n roll and was influenced by the music my Dad listened to as I was growing up in Belfast, he was and still is a fan of classic rock bands like Led Zeppelin, Deep Purple, Free etc, which was always on the hi fi. ... I was about nine years old when I just picked it up one day and sat down with a tuition book and started to learn a few chords".. By age 15 he entered Guitarist magazine's Young Guitarist of the Year, a performance competition staged that year at Wembley Conference Centre, which he won.

Less than a year later, a few months after his sixteenth birthday, McBride was recruited by the Belfast-based metal band Sweet Savage, which reformed in 1994 without their founding guitarist, Vivian Campbell, (who had gone on to be a member of Dio, Def Leppard and Whitesnake), who McBride replaced. He toured with the band and recorded two albums, Killing Time 1996 and Rune 1998.

After leaving Sweet Savage in 1998, he joined fellow Irishman Andrew Strong, who made his name in the 1991 cult film The Commitments and went on to establish a singing career. Playing with Strong was in stark contrast to Sweet Savage, involving mostly soul, R&B and some pop music. The change of musical style was a useful learning experience and closer in style to the rock and blues artists that had inspired McBride to start playing the guitar. He spent six years touring with Strong before leaving to pursue a solo career.

In the intervening years prior to going solo he formed Blind Friday, a guitar-based band from Belfast, Northern Ireland. Formed in 2003 by lead guitarist McBride and lead vocalist Robin Martin (The Horse), later additions came along with Marty McCloskey on drums and finally Mark Adair on bass guitar. Their music can only be described as true rock, with memorable guitar licks, pounding drums, driving bass and truly passionate vocals. The lyrical content is of a mixed nature, covering a wide range of topics from funny to controversial, a sound so unique Blind Friday were endorsed by world renowned names: PRS (Paul Reed Smith) Guitars, Gretsch Drums, and Framus Amplification. They released their only album 'Wake Up' in 2007 before breaking up.

In 2008, McBride released his debut album, Rich Man Falling on Nugene Records, a boutique label with a specialisation in guitarists and blues-based artists. The album contains covers of Be My Friend by Free and the Jimi Hendrix song "Power of Soul".

By this time, he had opened shows in the UK and Ireland for Jeff Beck, Joe Bonamassa and US slide guitarist Derek Trucks. In autumn 2010, he toured the UK supporting one of his early guitar heroes, Joe Satriani. In 2011, he played major festivals including Glastonbury Festival, and other gatherings including a special guest spot at Don Airey's Soul & Blues Festival in 2011 and 2013.

During a tour of the UK in 2011, each show was recorded. This resulted in McBride's third CD release Nine Lives (Nugene Records), so called because there are nine in-concert tracks. The album also contains four solo acoustic tracks, one of which is an acoustic rendition of the title track of his 2008 release Rich Man Falling.

In 2012, he released "Crossing The Line" (Nugene Records) an album of mostly original work plus the Blood, Sweat & Tears song "Go Down Gamblin'". The album was recorded in Belfast, Northern Ireland, and Maryland, USA, and mixed in New York by veteran producer/engineer Peter Denenberg. This album made several "best of" annual charts including that of Classic Rock magazine.

In 2016, McBride joined the classic rock band "Snakecharmer", which comprised former Whitesnake members, replacing Micky Moody, and recorded their album "Second Skin" released in May 2017 and touring with them ever since.

In 2022, he was announced as the temporary replacement for Steve Morse in Deep Purple, while Steve cared for his wife during her battle with cancer. Before he joined he had worked with Deep Purple keyboardist, Don Airey, on his solo tours as a member of "The Don Airey Band" or "Don Airey & Friends". On 23 July 2022 It was announced that Steve Morse had permanently left the band and saying that, "I'm now handing over the keys to the vault which holds the secret of how Ritchie (Blackmore)'s Smoke on the Water intro was recorded," and that McBride had the gig "nailed".

McBride was formally announced by Deep Purple as the permanent replacement for Morse on 16 September 2022. He thereby became the fourth permanent guitarist in the band over its 54-year history, after Ritchie Blackmore, Tommy Bolin and Steve Morse.

== Endorsements and teaching ==
As a teenage guitarist McBride caught the ear of the world's leading independent guitar builder Paul Reed Smith, and to this day McBride is a PRS Guitars-endorsed artist, a role that has taken him to music events around Europe and to The PRS Experience, an event held annually at the PRS Guitars factory in Maryland, US, where McBride has played alongside such names as Santana and Buddy Guy. He also endorses Victory amplifiers and D'addario Strings.

He is a visiting tutor at the Dublin school of BIMM (Brighton Institute of Modern Music) and has also been a guest tutor at the International Guitar Foundation summer school and at BIMM in Bristol.

== Selected discography ==
=== Solo releases ===
Year	Title	Label	Notes
2008	Rich Man Falling	Nugene Records	Studio
2010	Since Then	Nugene Records	Studio
2012	Crossing The Line	Nugene Records	Studio
2012	Nine Lives	Nugene Records	Live
2013	"No Room To Breathe"	Single	
2016	Official Live Bootleg – The Borderline, London 22.05.16	Rotosound, PRS Paul Reed Smith Guitars	Live
2017	Official Live Bootleg 02 (Live In Bonn-16-12.2017)	Not on Label	Live
2019	"Show Me How To Love"	Ear Music	Single
2020	"Trouble"	Ear Music	Single
2022	The Fighter	Ear Music	
2025	Recordings 2020-2025		

=== As band/session member ===
Year	Band/artist	Title	Notes
1996	Sweet Savage	Killing Time	Band member
1998	Sweet Savage	Rune	Band member
2003	Sound of Our Souls	Live in Belfast	Session Member
2012	Clive Culbertson	Still Here Still Smiling	Session member
2016	Don Airey & Friends	Live In Prague	Band member
2017	Snakecharmer	Second Skin	Band member
2017	The Irish Rovers	The Unicorn, the Continuing Story	Session member
2019	Ian Gillan With The Don Airey Band And Orchestra	Contractual Obligation #2: Live In Warsaw	Band member
2021	Don Airey & Friends	Live In Hamburg	Band member
2021	Darby T0dd	The Real1ty 0f Zer0s And 0nes	Session member
2024	Deep Purple	=1	Band member
2026	Deep Purple	Splat!	Band member
