= =1 =

Studio album by Deep Purple
- Released: 19 July 2024
- Recorded: 2023–2024
- Studios: 80A (Toronto); Chameleon (Hamburg); Haileywood; Headline (Harston); Noble Street (Toronto); Ocean Way (Nashville); SMB
- Genres: Hard rock; progressive rock
- Length: 52:06
- Label: earMusic
- Producer: Bob Ezrin

Deep Purple chronology
Turning to Crime (2021)	=1 (2024)	SPLAT! (2026)

Singles from =1
- 1. "Portable Door" Released: 30 April 2024; 2. "Pictures of You" Released: 5 June 2024; 3. "Lazy Sod" Released: 3 July 2024

Professional ratings
Review scores
Source	Rating
Allmusic	3.5/5 stars
Blabbermouth.net	8/10
Classic Rock	4/5 stars

=1 (Note: Pronounced "Equals one".) is the 23rd studio album by English hard rock band Deep Purple, released on 19 July 2024 by Earmusic/Edel AG. It is their first album with guitarist Simon McBride, who replaced Steve Morse in 2022. It is also the band's fifth collaboration with producer Bob Ezrin, who has produced every Deep Purple album since 2013's Now What?!

== Themes and reception ==
=1 is a hard rock and progressive rock album, which the band described as having a loose concept around "[symbolising] the idea that in a world growing ever more complex, everything eventually simplifies down to a single, unified essence. Everything equals one".

Music writer John Aizlewood described singer Ian Gillan's voice as "richer than it's sounded in years".

== Track listing ==
All tracks are written by Ian Gillan, Roger Glover, Ian Paice, Don Airey, Simon McBride and Bob Ezrin.

=1 track listing
No.	Title	Length
1.	"Show Me"	3:59
2.	"A Bit on the Side"	4:10
3.	"Sharp Shooter"	3:44
4.	"Portable Door"	3:48
5.	"Old-Fangled Thing"	4:08
6.	"If I Were You"	4:42
7.	"Pictures of You"	3:51
8.	"I'm Saying Nothin'"	3:28
9.	"Lazy Sod"	3:40
10.	"Now You're Talkin'"	4:05
11.	"No Money to Burn"	3:21
12.	"I'll Catch You"	3:20
13.	"Bleeding Obvious"	5:50
Total length:		52:06

== Personnel ==
Deep Purple

- Don Airey – keyboards, orchestral arrangement (track 6)
- Ian Gillan – lead vocals, backing vocals (tracks 1, 4–9, 13)
- Ian Paice – drums
- Roger Glover – bass, shaker (track 3)
- Simon McBride – guitars, additional guitar engineering

Additional musicians

- Alan Umstead – concertmaster
- Bob Ezrin – backing vocals (tracks 1, 6, 8, 11, 13), tambourine (1), orchestral arrangement (track 6)
- Camille Harrison – backing vocals (tracks 11, 13)
- Nashville Music Scoring – orchestra (track 6)
- Patricia Shirley-Okujene – backing vocals (tracks 11, 13)

Technical

- Anthony Yordanov – mixing, engineering
- Bob Ezrin – production, mixing
- Daniel Goldade – engineering assistance
- Denny Meißner – additional vocal engineering
- Eike Freese – additional vocal engineering
- James Paice – additional drum production and engineering (track 6)
- Jasper Terpstra – engineering assistance
- Jill Zimmermann – engineering
- Julian Shank – mixing
- Justin Cortelyou – engineering
- Michael Gnocato – engineering assistance
- Nick Spezia – orchestra engineering (track 6)
- Piers Mortimer – additional keyboard engineering
- Robert Vosgien – mastering

== Charts ==
=== Weekly charts ===
Weekly chart performance for =1
Chart (2024)	Peak position
Australian Albums (ARIA)	58
Austrian Albums (Ö3 Austria)	2
Belgian Albums (Ultratop Flanders)	8
Belgian Albums (Ultratop Wallonia)	6
Czech Albums (ČNS IFPI)	7
Danish Albums (Hitlisten)	14
Dutch Albums (Album Top 100)	8
Finnish Albums (Suomen virallinen lista)	3
French Albums (SNEP)	16
German Albums (Offizielle Top 100)	1
Hungarian Albums (MAHASZ)	14
Italian Albums (FIMI)	16
Japanese Albums (Oricon)	34
Japanese Hot Albums (Billboard Japan)	31
Polish Albums (ZPAV)	2
Scottish Albums (Official Charts)	3
Spanish Albums (Promusicae)	42
Swedish Albums (Sverigetopplistan)	1
Swiss Albums (Schweizer Hitparade)	1
UK Albums (Official Charts)	12
UK Independent Albums (Official Charts)	1
UK Rock & Metal Albums (Official Charts)	2
US Top Album Sales (Billboard)	19
US Top Hard Rock Albums (Billboard)	24

=== Year-end charts ===
Year-end chart performance for =1
Chart (2024)	Position
German Albums (Offizielle Top 100)	84
Swiss Albums (Schweizer Hitparade)	77
