= Turning to Crime =

Studio album by Deep Purple
- Released: 26 November 2021
- Studio: Real World Studios (Wiltshire)
- Genres: Blues rock; hard rock
- Length: 49:45
- Label: earMusic
- Producer: Bob Ezrin

Deep Purple chronology
| Whoosh! (2020) | Turning to Crime (2021) | =1 (2024) |

Turning to Crime is the twenty-second album by English rock band Deep Purple. Released on 26 November 2021, it is composed entirely of covers, and is the last Deep Purple album to feature guitarist Steve Morse before he left the band in July 2022.

== Background and recording ==
Turning to Crime was created following a suggestion by Bob Ezrin, Deep Purple's producer since 2013. Released about fifteen months after Whoosh!, this marked the first time since 1975's Come Taste the Band that Deep Purple had released a new studio album just one year after their previous one.

A 13th Track "(I'm a) Road Runner" was released as a download for subscribers on October 6, 2021, and later on the Limited Edition 5×12″ Vinyl Box Set, as the B-side of "7 and 7 Is".

Professional ratings
Review scores
| Source | Rating |
|---|---|
| Classic Rock | 4/5 stars |
| laut.de | 4/5 stars |
| Louder Sound | 4/5 stars |

== Track listing ==
Turning to Crime track listing
| No. | Title | Writer(s) | Original artist | Length |
|---|---|---|---|---|
| 1. | "7 and 7 Is" | Arthur Lee | Love | 2:28 |
| 2. | "Rockin' Pneumonia and the Boogie Woogie Flu" | Huey "Piano" Smith | Huey "Piano" Smith | 3:15 |
| 3. | "Oh Well" | Peter Green | Fleetwood Mac | 4:21 |
| 4. | "Jenny Take a Ride!" | Bob Crewe, Little Richard, Enotris Johnson | Mitch Ryder & The Detroit Wheels | 4:36 |
| 5. | "Watching the River Flow" | Bob Dylan | Bob Dylan | 3:02 |
| 6. | "Let the Good Times Roll" | Sam Theard, Fleecie Moore | Louis Jordan & the Tympany Five | 4:22 |
| 7. | "Dixie Chicken" | Lowell George, Fred Martin | Little Feat | 4:43 |
| 8. | "Shapes of Things" | Jim McCarty, Keith Relf, Paul Samwell-Smith | Yardbirds / Jeff Beck Group | 3:40 |
| 9. | "The Battle of New Orleans" | Jimmy Driftwood | Johnny Horton | 2:51 |
| 10. | "Lucifer" | Bob Seger | The Bob Seger System | 3:45 |
| 11. | "White Room" | Jack Bruce, Pete Brown | Cream | 4:53 |
| 12. | "Caught in the Act": a. "Going Down"; b. "Green Onions"; c. "Hot 'Lanta"; d. "Dazed and Confused"; e. "Gimme Some Lovin'" | a. Don Nix; b. Booker T. Jones, Steve Cropper, Lewie Steinberg, Al Jackson Jr.; c. Duane Allman, Gregg Allman, Dickey Betts, Butch Trucks, Berry Oakley, Jai Johanny Johanson; d. Jake Holmes, Jimmy Page, Robert Plant; e. Steve Winwood, Spencer Davis, Muff Winwood | a. Moloch; b. Booker T & the MGs; c. Allman Brothers Band; d. Jake Holmes; e. Spencer Davis Group | 7:49 |
| Total length: | | | | 49:45 |

== Personnel ==
Credits per Turning To Crime liner notes.

Deep Purple

- Ian Gillan – vocals (all tracks), backing vocals (2, 4, 5, 7, 8, 10, 11), percussion (3, 7)
- Steve Morse – guitars (all tracks), vocals (9)
- Roger Glover – bass guitar (all tracks), additional keyboards (1), backing vocals, percussion (7), vocals (9)
- Ian Paice – drums (all tracks), percussion (7)
- Don Airey – keyboards (all tracks)

Additional musicians

- Bob Ezrin – backing vocals (2, 5, 7, 8, 10–12), vocals (9)
- Leo Green – tenor saxophone (2, 6), horns arrangement (2)
- Matt Holland – trumpet (2, 6)
- Nicole Thalia – backing vocals (4, 6, 12)
- Marsha B. Morrison – backing vocals (4, 6, 12)
- Gina Forsyth – fiddle (9)
- Bruce Daigrepont – squeezebox (9)
- Julian Shank – percussion (10)

Technical personnel

- Bob Ezrin – production, mixing, engineering
- Julian Shank – engineering
- Peter Sené – recording for Ian Gillan
- James Paice – recording for Ian Paice
- Faye Dolle – recording assistant for Ian Gillan
- Bill Evans – additional engineering (3)
- Junior Garr – backing vocal recording (4, 6, 11, 12)
- David Farrell – squeeze box recording (9)
- Robert Vosgien – mastering

== Charts ==
=== Weekly charts ===
Weekly chart performance for Turning to Crime
| Chart (2021) | Peak position |
|---|---|
| Austrian Albums (Ö3 Austria) | 5 |
| Belgian Albums (Ultratop Flanders) | 29 |
| Belgian Albums (Ultratop Wallonia) | 22 |
| Czech Albums (ČNS IFPI) | 8 |
| Dutch Albums (Album Top 100) | 25 |
| Finnish Albums (Suomen virallinen lista) | 6 |
| German Albums (Offizielle Top 100) | 5 |
| Hungarian Albums (MAHASZ) | 24 |
| Italian Albums (FIMI) | 24 |
| Norwegian Albums (VG-lista) | 21 |
| Polish Albums (ZPAV) | 9 |
| Scottish Albums (Official Charts) | 12 |
| Slovak Albums (ČNS IFPI) | 95 |
| Spanish Albums (Promusicae) | 50 |
| Swedish Albums (Sverigetopplistan) | 14 |
| Swiss Albums (Schweizer Hitparade) | 4 |
| UK Albums (Official Charts) | 28 |
| UK Independent Albums (Official Charts) | 1 |
| UK Rock & Metal Albums (Official Charts) | 1 |

=== Year-end charts ===
Year-end chart performance for Turning to Crime
| Chart (2021) | Position |
|---|---|
| German Albums (Offizielle Top 100) | 92 |
| Swiss Albums (Schweizer Hitparade) | 95 |
