= Deep Purple discography =

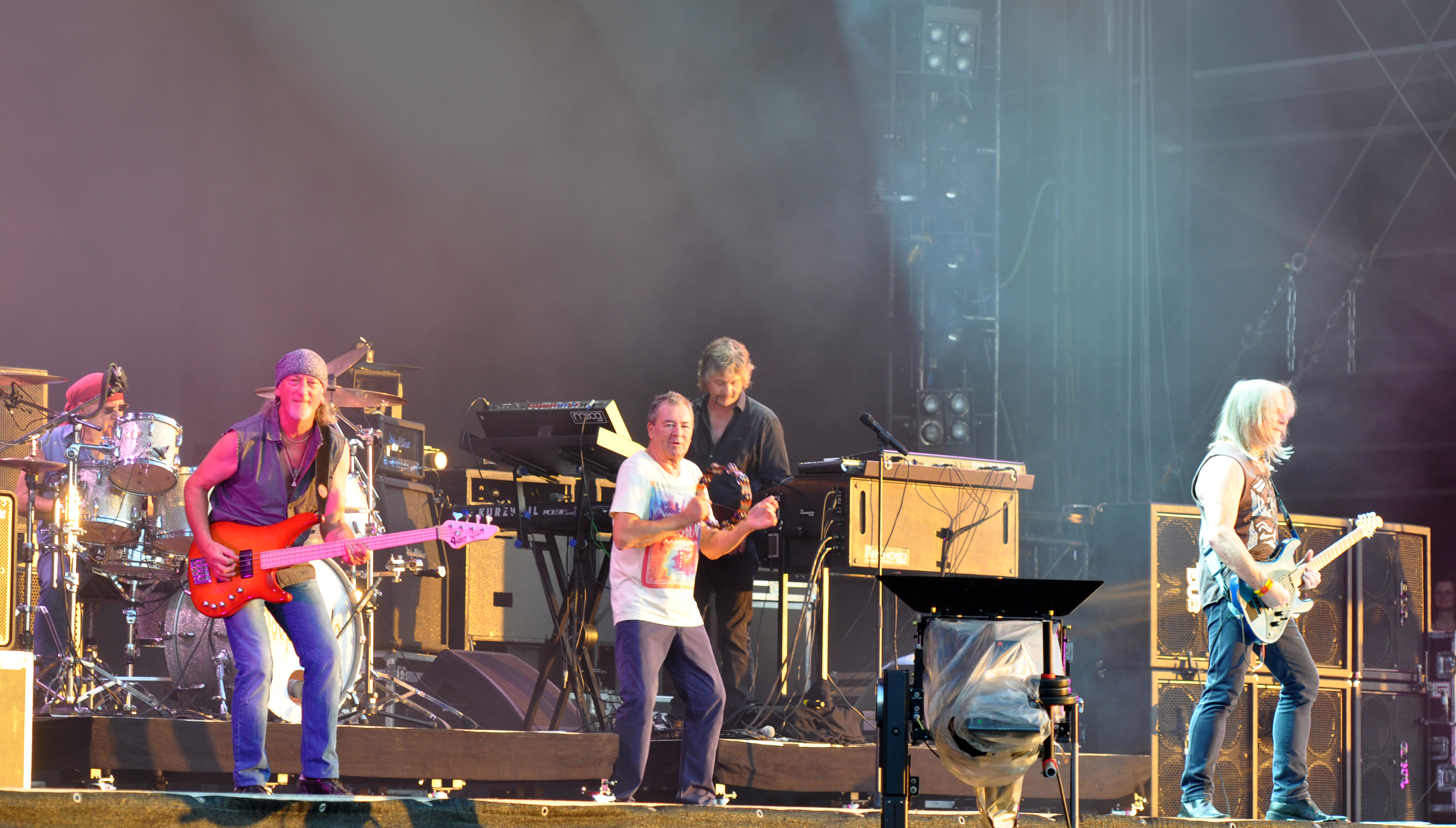
- Deep Purple (2013)
- Studio albums: 24
- Extended plays: 4
- Live albums: 48
- Compilation albums: 25
- Singles: 60
- Video albums: 26
- Music videos: 28

English hard rock band Deep Purple have released 24 studio albums, 48 live albums, 25 compilation albums, four EPs, 60 singles, 26 video albums and 28 music videos.

Formed in early 1968 by Jon Lord, Ian Paice, Rod Evans, Ritchie Blackmore, and Nick Simper, Deep Purple released their debut album, Shades of Deep Purple, in July of that year.

The band has taken on many new members over the years, and since 2002, Paice is the only member from the original line-up still with the band.

== Albums ==
=== Studio albums ===
Title	Album details	Peak chart positions										Certifications
Title	Album details	UK	AUS	AUT	FIN	GER	NED	NOR	SWE	SWI	US	Certifications
Shades of Deep Purple	Released: 17 July 1968; Label: Parlophone; Formats: LP, CS, CD, Reel, 8-track	—	—	—	—	—	—	—	—	—	24	
The Book of Taliesyn	Released: December 1968; Label: Harvest; Formats: LP, CS, CD, Reel, 8-track	—	—	—	—	—	—	—	—	—	54	
Deep Purple	Released: June 1969; Label: Harvest; Formats: LP, CS, CD, Reel, 8-track	—	—	—	—	—	—	—	—	—	162	BVMI: Gold
Deep Purple in Rock	Released: 5 June 1970; Label: Harvest; Formats: LP, CS, CD, Reel, 8-track	4	1	1	9	1	—	1	5	—	143	BPI: Gold; FIMI: Gold; RIAA: Gold; SNEP: Gold
Fireball	Released: July 1971; Label: Harvest; Formats: LP, CS, CD, Reel, 8-track	1	5	1	2	1	3	1	1	—	32	RIAA: Gold; BVMI: Gold
Machine Head	Released: 30 March 1972; Label: Purple; Formats: LP, CS, CD, 2xCD, Reel, 8-track	1	1	4	1	1	1	3	4	19	7	BPI: Gold; FIMI: Gold; RIAA: 2× Platinum; SNEP: 2× Gold
Who Do We Think We Are	Released: 12 January 1973; Label: Purple; Formats: LP, CS, CD, Reel, 8-track	4	5	2	11	3	5	1	1	—	15	RIAA: Gold; SNEP: Gold
Burn	Released: 15 February 1974; Label: Purple; Formats: LP, CS, CD, Reel, 8-track	3	7	1	5	1	7	1	1	—	9	BPI: Gold; RIAA: Gold; BVMI: Gold; SNEP: Gold
Stormbringer	Released: 8 November 1974; Label: Purple; Formats: LP, CS, CD, Reel, 8-track	6	8	4	6	10	—	2	6	—	20	BPI: Silver; RIAA: Gold; SNEP: Gold
Come Taste the Band	Released: 7 November 1975; Label: Purple; Formats: LP, CS, CD, Reel, 8-track	19	11	—	—	29	12	6	16	—	43	BPI: Silver; CZECH: Gold
Perfect Strangers	Released: 29 October 1984; Label: Polydor; Formats: LP, CS, CD, 8-track	5	19	5	22	2	16	1	3	1	17	BPI: Gold; ARIA: Gold; BVMI: Gold; MC: Platinum; RIAA: Platinum
The House of Blue Light	Released: 12 January 1987; Label: Polydor; Formats: LP, CS, CD	10	39	11	1	1	11	1	1	3	34	BPI: Silver; MC: Gold; IFPI SWI: Gold
Slaves and Masters	Released: 22 October 1990; Label: RCA; Formats: LP, CS, CD	45	72	28	22	23	72	16	12	5	87	IFPI SWI: Gold
The Battle Rages On...	Released: 19 July 1993; Label: BMG; Formats: LP, CS, CD	21	—	9	9	13	39	9	8	7	192	
Purpendicular	Released: 5 February 1996; Label: BMG; Formats: LP, CS, CD	58	—	16	9	20	87	30	3	17	—	
Abandon	Released: 25 May 1998; Label: EMI; Formats: LP, CS, CD	76	—	25	14	16	—	6	32	46	—	
Bananas	Released: 25 August 2003; Label: EMI; Formats: LP, CD	85	—	12	6	3	—	19	18	13	—	
Rapture of the Deep	Released: 24 October 2005; Label: Edel; Formats: LP, CD	81	—	20	11	10	—	—	22	16	—	
Now What?!	Released: 26 April 2013; Label: earMusic; Formats: LP, CD	19	—	1	8	1	12	1	7	2	110	BVMI: Gold
Infinite	Released: 7 April 2017; Label: earMusic; Formats: LP, CS, CD	6	20	4	4	1	6	3	5	1	105	BVMI: Gold
Whoosh!	Released: 7 August 2020; Label: earMusic; Formats: LP, CD	4	13	1	1	1	7	3	3	1	161	
Turning to Crime	Released: 26 November 2021; Label: earMusic; Formats: LP, CD	28	—	5	6	5	25	21	14	4	—	
=1	Released: 20 July 2024; Label: earMusic; Formats: LP, CD	12	58	2	3	1	8	—	1	1	—	
Splat!	Released: 3 July 2026; Label: earMusic; Formats: LP, CS, CD	12	19	2	3	3	13	9	3	2	—	
"—" denotes items that did not chart or were not released in that territory.

=== Live albums ===
Title	Album details	Peak chart positions										Certifications
Title	Album details	UK	AUT	CAN	FIN	GER	ITA	NED	NOR	SWE	US	Certifications
Concerto for Group and Orchestra	Released: 10 December 1969; Label: Harvest; Formats: LP, CS, CD, 2xSACD, 8-track	26	—	50	—	22	—	—	—	—	149	
Made in Japan / Re-released as Live in Japan in 1993	Released: 22 December 1972; Label: Purple; Formats: 2xLP, CS, CD, 2xCD; Re-released: November 1993; Label: EMI; Formats: 3xCD	16	1	5	4	1	7	4	7	6	6	BPI: Gold; BVMI: Platinum; FIMI: Platinum; IFPI AUT: Platinum; RIAA: Platinum; SNEP: Gold
Made in Europe / Re-released as Mk III: The Final Concerts in 1996	Released: November 1976; Label: Purple; Formats: LP, CS, CD; Re-released: 5 August 1996; Label: Connoisseur; Formats: 2xCD	12	—	—	—	10	12	—	—	25	148	
Last Concert in Japan / Re-released as This Time Around: Live in Tokyo in 2001	Released: March 1977; Label: Purple; Formats: LP, CS, CD; Re-released: September 2001; Label: Purple; Formats: 2xCD	—	—	—	—	—	—	—	—	—	—	
Deep Purple in Concert	Released: 1 December 1980; Label: Harvest; Formats: 2xLP, CS, 2xCD	30	—	—	—	142	—	—	—	—	206 (Note: Deep Purple in Concert did not enter the Billboard 200, but peaked at number 206 on the Bubbling Under the Top LP's chart in 1982.)	
Live in London	Released: 23 August 1982; Label: Harvest; Formats: LP, CS, 2xCD	23	74	—	—	—	—	—	—	—	—	
Nobody's Perfect	Released: 20 June 1988; Label: Polydor; Formats: 2xLP, CS, 2xCD	38	16	—	5	13	—	44	5	5	105	
Scandinavian Nights / Re-released as Live in Stockholm in 2005 and Stockholm 1970 in 2014	Released: 10 October 1988; Label: Connoisseur Collection; Formats: 2xLP, 2xCD; Re-released: 2005; Label: Purple; Formats: 2xCD; Re-released: March 2014; Label: earMusic; Formats: 3xLP, 2xCD	—	—	—	—	—	187	—	—	—	—	
In the Absence of Pink: Knebworth 85	Released: 29 July 1991; Label: Connoisseur Society; Formats: 2xCD	—	—	—	—	—	—	—	—	—	—	
Gemini Suite Live	Released: July 1993; Label: RPM; Formats: LP, CD	—	—	—	—	—	—	—	—	—	—	
Come Hell or High Water / Re-released as Live in Europe 1993 in 2006	Released: 31 October 1994; Label: BMG/RCA; Formats: CD; Re-released: 21 February 2006; Label: Sony/BMG; Formats: 4xCD	—	—	—	—	—	—	—	—	—	—	
On the Wings of a Russian Foxbat: Live in California 1976 (UK title) / King Biscuit Flower Hour Presents: Deep Purple in Concert (US title) / Re-released as Long Beach 1976 in 2016	Released: July 1995; Label: King Biscuit Flower Hour; Formats: 2xCD; Re-released: April 2016; Label: earMusic; Formats: 3xLP, 2xCD	—	—	—	—	89	—	—	—	—	—	
California Jamming / Re-released as Just Might Take Your Life in 2003	Released: 27 May 1996; Label: Eagle; Formats: CD; Re-released: 2003; Label: Sonic Zoom; Format: CD	—	—	—	—	—	—	—	—	—	—	
Live at the Olympia '96	Released: 9 June 1997; Label: EMI; Formats: 3xLP, 2xCD	—	—	—	—	98	—	—	—	—	—	
Total Abandon: Australia '99	Released: September 1999; Label: Eagle; Formats: 2xLP, 2xCD	—	—	—	—	—	—	—	—	—	—	
In Concert with The London Symphony Orchestra	Released: 8 February 2000; Label: Eagle; Formats: 4xLP, 2xCD	—	—	—	—	32	—	—	86	—	—	
Days May Come and Days May Go: The California Rehearsals	Released: 14 March 2000; Label: Purple; Formats: CD	—	—	—	—	—	—	—	—	—	—	
1420 Beachwood Drive: The California Rehearsals Pt. 2	Released: 14 March 2000; Label: Purple; Formats: CD	—	—	—	—	—	—	—	—	—	—	
The Bootleg Series	Released: 2000; Label: Thames Thompson; Formats: 12xCD	—	—	—	—	—	—	—	—	—	—	
Live in Paris 1975 / Re-released as Paris 1975 in 2012	Released: April 2001; Label: Purple; Formats: 2xCD; Re-released: December 2012; Label: earMusic; Formats: 3xLP, 2xCD	—	—	—	—	—	—	—	—	—	—	
Space Vol 1 & 2 / Re-released as Live in Aachen 1970 in 2005	Released: July 2001; Label: Sonic Zoom; Formats: CD; Re-released: 2005; Label: Sonic Zoom; Formats: CD	—	—	—	—	—	—	—	—	—	—	
Live at the Rotterdam Ahoy	Released: 2001; Label: Thames Thompson; Formats: 2xCD	—	—	—	—	—	—	—	—	—	—	
The Soundboard Series	Released: October 2001; Label: Thames Thompson; Formats: 12xCD	—	—	—	—	—	—	—	—	—	—	
Inglewood / Re-released as Live at Inglewood 1968 in 2009	Released: 2002; Label: Sonic Zoom; Formats: CD; Re-released: 2009; Label: Sonic Zoom; Formats: CD	—	—	—	—	—	—	—	—	—	—	
Live in Denmark '72 / Re-released as Live in Denmark 1972 in 2007 and Copenhagen 1972 in 2013	Released: December 2002; Label: Sonic Zoom; Formats: 2xCD; Re-released: 2007; Label: Sonic Zoom; Formats: 2xCD; Re-released: May 2013; Label: earMusic; Formats: 3xLP, 2xCD	—	—	—	—	—	—	—	—	—	—	
Kneel & Pray / Re-released as Live in Montreux 1969 in 2006	Released: 2003; Label: Sonic Zoom; Formats: 2xCD; Re-released: 2006; Label: Sonic Zoom; Formats: 2xCD	—	—	—	—	—	—	—	—	—	—	
New, Live & Rare	Released: February 2004; Label: Sonic Zoom; Formats: CD	—	—	—	—	—	—	—	—	—	—	
Perks and Tit / Re-released as Live in San Diego 1974 in 2007	Released: 29 March 2004; Label: Sonic Zoom; Formats: CD; Re-released: 2007; Label: Sonic Zoom; Formats: CD	—	—	—	—	—	—	—	—	—	—	
Live Encounters	Released: 2004; Label: Thames Thompson; Formats: 3xLP, 2xCD	—	—	—	—	—	—	—	—	—	—	
Live at Montreux 1996	Released: May 2006; Label: Eagle; Formats: 2xLP, CD	—	—	—	—	92	—	—	—	—	—	MC: Gold
Live at Montreux 2006	Released: 12 June 2007; Label: Eagle; Formats: 2xLP, CD	—	—	—	—	—	—	—	—	—	—	
Phoenix Rising	Released: 11 May 2011; Label: Edel; Formats: CD	188	50	—	—	22	—	—	38	—	—	
BBC Sessions 1968–1970	Released: 7 November 2011; Label: EMI; Formats: 2xCD	—	—	—	—	94	—	—	—	—	—	
Live at Montreux 2011	Released: 7 November 2011; Label: Eagle; Formats: 2xCD	—	—	—	—	43	—	—	—	—	—	
Perfect Strangers Live	Released: 14 October 2013; Label: Eagle Vision; Formats: 2xLP, 2xCD	—	53	—	—	20	—	—	—	59	—	
The Now What?! Live Tapes	Released: 19 November 2013; Label: earMusic; Formats: 2xLP, 2xCD	—	—	—	—	—	—	—	—	—	—	
Graz 1975	Released: September 2014; Label: earMusic; Formats: 2xLP, CD	92	8	—	49	47	—	88	—	—	—	
Live in Verona	Released: 8 October 2014; Label: Eagle; Formats: 2xCD	—	—	—	—	—	—	—	—	—	—	
Long Beach 1971	Released: February 2015; Label: earMusic; Formats: 2xLP, CD, digital download	—	—	—	—	68	—	99	—	—	—	
From the Setting Sun... (In Wacken)	Released: April 2015; Label: Edel; Formats: 2xCD	—	31	—	—	18	—	35	—	—	—	
...To the Rising Sun (In Tokyo)	Released: April 2015; Label: Edel; Formats: 2xCD	—	44	—	—	21	—	46	—	—	—	
The Infinite Live Recordings, Vol. 1	Released: 17 November 2017; Label: earMusic; Formats: 3xLP, 2xCD	—	—	—	—	66	—	—	—	—	—	
Live in Newcastle 2001	Released: 5 July 2019; Label: earMusic; Formats: 3xLP, 2xCD	—	25	—	—	14	—	—	—	—	—	
Live in Rome 2013	Released: 6 December 2019; Label: earMusic; Formats: 3xLP, 2xCD	—	—	—	—	78	—	—	—	—	—	
Live in Wollongong 2001	Released: 13 August 2021; Label: earMusic; Formats: 3xLP, 2xCD	—	—	—	—	8	—	—	—	—	—	
Live in London 2002	Released: 13 August 2021; Label: earMusic; Formats: 3xLP, 2xCD	—	—	—	—	9	—	—	—	—	—	
Bombay Calling	Released: 18 August 2022; Label: earMusic; Formats: 3xLP, 2xCD	—	—	—	—	—	—	—	—	—	—	
Live in Hong Kong 2001	Released: 2022; Label: earMusic; Formats: 3xLP, 2xCD	—	—	—	—	—	—	—	—	—	—	
"—" denotes items that did not chart or were not released in that territory.

=== Compilation albums ===
Title	Album details	Peak chart positions										Certifications
Title	Album details	UK	AUS	AUT	FIN	GER	ITA	NED	NOR	SWE	US	Certifications
Purple Passages	Released: September 1972; Label: Warner Bros.; Formats: 2xLP, CS, CD	—	—	—	—	—	—	—	—	—	57	RIAA: Gold
Mark I & II	Released: December 1973; Label: Purple; Formats: 2xLP	—	—	—	—	18	—	—	—	—	—	
24 Carat Purple	Released: June 1975; Label: Purple; Formats: LP, CS, CD, 8-track	14	67	6	29	34	18	4	14	—	—	BPI: Silver
Powerhouse	Released: December 1977; Label: Purple; Formats: LP	—	54	—	—	50	—	—	—	—	—	
When We Rock, We Rock, and When We Roll, We Roll	Released: October 1978; Label: Warner Bros.; Formats: LP, CS, CD	—	—	—	—	—	—	—	—	—	201 (Note: When We Rock, We Rock, and When We Roll, We Roll did not enter the Billboard 200, but peaked at number 201 on the Bubbling Under the Top LP's chart.)	
The Deep Purple Singles A's and B's	Released: October 1978; Label: Harvest; Formats: LP, CS, CD	—	—	—	—	78	—	—	—	—	—	IFPI AUT: Gold
The Mark II Purple Singles	Released: April 1979; Label: Purple; Formats: LP	24	—	—	—	—	—	—	—	—	—	
Deepest Purple: The Very Best of Deep Purple	Released: 4 July 1980; Label: Harvest; Formats: LP, CS, CD	1	5	—	—	—	—	—	—	—	148	BPI: Gold; ARIA: Platinum; BVMI: Gold; RIAA: Platinum
Greatest Purple	Released: January 1985; Label: EMI; Formats: CD	—	—	28	—	14	—	—	—	—	—	
The Anthology	Released: June 1985; Label: Harvest; Formats: 2xLP, CS, 2xCD	50	—	—	—	—	—	86	—	—	—	
Knocking at Your Back Door: The Best of Deep Purple in the 80's	Released: April 1992; Label: Mercury/PolyGram; Formats: LP, CS, CD	—	—	—	—	—	—	—	—	—	—	
The Compact Disc Deep Purple Singles A's and B's	Released: January 1993; Label: EMI; Formats: CD	—	—	—	—	—	—	—	—	—	—	
Smoke on the Water: The Best Of	Released: July 1994; Label: EMI; Formats: CD	—	—	—	—	—	—	—	28	—	—	SNEP: Gold
30: Very Best of Deep Purple	Released: 12 October 1998; Label: EMI; Formats: 2xLP, CD, 2xCD	39	41	41	16	73	—	—	17	18	—	BPI: Gold
Shades 1968–1998	Released: 16 March 1999; Label: Rhino; Formats: 4xCD	—	—	—	—	—	—	—	—	—	—	
The Very Best of Deep Purple	Released: May 2000; Label: Rhino; Formats: CD	43	—	—	—	—	99	—	—	—	—	
Listen, Learn, Read On	Released: 8 October 2002; Label: EMI; Formats: 6xCD	—	—	—	—	—	—	—	—	—	—	
Purple Hits	Released: June 2003; Label: EMI; Formats: CD	—	—	—	10	—	—	—	—	—	—	
The Early Years	Released: 1 March 2004; Label: EMI; Formats: CD	—	—	—	—	—	—	—	22	—	—	
Deep Purple Forever: The Very Best Of	Released: 17 March 2005; Label: EMI; Formats: CD	—	—	—	—	—	—	—	—	19	—	
The Platinum Collection	Released: 21 March 2005; Label: EMI; Formats: 3xCD	39	—	63	—	—	13	—	—	—	—	BPI: Silver
Singles & E.P. Anthology '68–'80	Released: March 2010; Label: EMI; Formats: 2xCD	—	—	—	—	—	—	—	—	—	—	
Hard Road: The Mark 1 Studio Recordings 1968–69	Released: 25 July 2014; Label: EMI; Formats: 5xCD	—	—	—	—	—	—	—	—	—	—	
The Vinyl Collection	Released: 29 January 2016; Label: Universal; Formats: 7xLP	—	—	—	—	86	—	—	—	—	—	
A Fire in the Sky	Released: 15 September 2017; Label: Rhino; Formats: 3xLP, CD, 3xCD	—	—	—	—	65	—	—	—	—	—	
"—" denotes items that did not chart or were not released in that territory. This table shows principal UK and US releases and other compilation albums with chart placings only. There are over 150 Deep Purple compilation albums released worldwide.

== Extended plays ==
Title	Extended play details	Peak chart positions
Title	Extended play details	UK
New, Live & Rare	Released: 30 September 1977; Label: Purple; Formats: 7-inch EP	31
New, Live & Rare Vol.2	Released: 15 September 1978; Label: Purple; Formats: 7-inch EP; 12-inch EP	45
New, Live & Rare Vol.3	Released: October 1980; Label: Harvest; Formats: 7-inch EP	48
Guilt Trippin'	Released: 23 June 2026; Label: earMusic; Formats: 12-inch EP, CD, digital download	

== Singles ==
This section presents all singles released in European, US/Canadian and Japanese markets.

Year	Title	Peak chart positions											Certifications	Album
Year	Title	UK	AUS	AUT	BEL	CAN	FIN	SWI	GER	IRE	NED	US	Certifications	Album
1968	"Hush"	—	27	—	—	2	—	7	—	—	—	4		Shades of Deep Purple
1968	"Kentucky Woman"	—	27	—	—	21	—	—	—	—	—	38		The Book of Taliesyn
1969	"River Deep – Mountain High"	—	81	—	—	42	—	—	—	—	—	53		The Book of Taliesyn
1969	"Emmaretta"	—	44	—	—	79	—	—	—	—	—	128		Non-album single
1969	"Help!"^{[k]}	—	—	—	—	—	—	—	—	—	—	—		Shades of Deep Purple
1969	"Hallelujah"	—	—	16	—	—	—	—	—	—	—	108		Non-album singles
1970	"Black Night"^{[d]}	2	14	4	1	67	34	1	2	4	8	66		Non-album singles
1970	"Speed King"^{[i]}	—	—	—	—	—	—	—	38	—	—	—		Deep Purple in Rock
1971	"Strange Kind of Woman"	8	44	14	27	—	—	—	8	16	—	—		Non-album single ^{[1]}
1971	"Fireball"	15	58	—	—	—	22	—	19	—	24	—		Fireball
1972	"Never Before"	35	80	—	45	—	—	4	20	—	—	—		Machine Head
1972	"Lazy"^{[u]}	—	—	—	—	—	—	—	—	—	—	—		Machine Head
1972	"Child in Time"^{[a]}	—	—	—	—	—	—	—	—	—	10	—		Deep Purple in Rock
1972	"Highway Star"^{[u][j]}	—	—	—	—	—	—	—	—	—	—	—		Machine Head
1973	"Woman from Tokyo"	—	92	—	23	55	—	—	16	—	6	60		Who Do We Think We Are
1973	"Smoke on the Water"	—	54	11	27	2	—	—	20	—	11	4	BPI: Platinum; RIAA: Gold	Machine Head
1973	"Super Trouper"^{[a]}	—	—	—	—	—	—	—	—	—	—	—		Who Do We Think We Are
1974	"Might Just Take Your Life"^{[f]}	55	—	—	—	84	—	—	—	—	—	91		Burn
1974	"Burn"^{[u][j]}	—	—	—	—	—	—	—	—	—	—	105		Burn
1974	"You Can't Do It Right"^{[u]}	—	—	—	—	—	—	—	—	—	—	—		Stormbringer
1974	"Lady Double Dealer"^{[j]}	—	—	—	—	—	—	—	—	—	—	—		Stormbringer
1975	"Stormbringer"	—	—	—	—	—	—	—	—	—	—	—		Stormbringer
1975	"Child in Time" (EP)^{[a]}	—	—	—	26	—	—	—	—	—	9	—		Deep Purple in Rock
1975	"Black Night" (live)^{[j]}	—	—	—	—	—	—	—	—	—	—	—		24 Carat Purple
1976	"Gettin' Tighter"^{[u]}	—	—	—	—	—	—	—	—	—	—	—		Come Taste the Band
1976	"You Keep on Moving"	—	—	—	—	—	—	—	—	—	—	—		Come Taste the Band
1977	"Smoke on the Water" (live)^{[e]}	21	—	—	—	—	—	—	—	—	—	—		Made in Japan
1984	"Nobody's Home"	—	—	—	—	—	—	—	—	—	—	—		Perfect Strangers
1984	"Knocking at Your Back Door"	68	—	—	—	—	—	—	—	—	—	61		Perfect Strangers
1985	"Perfect Strangers"	48	—	—	—	—	—	—	—	—	—	—		Perfect Strangers
1987	"Call of the Wild"	92	—	—	—	—	—	—	—	—	93	—		The House of Blue Light
1987	"Bad Attitude"	—	—	—	—	—	—	—	—	—	—	—		The House of Blue Light
1988	"Hush"^{[c]}	62	—	—	—	—	—	—	—	—	—	—		Nobody's Perfect
1990	"King of Dreams"	70	138	—	—	56	—	—	—	—	—	—		Slaves and Masters
1990	"Fire in the Basement"	—	—	—	—	—	—	—	—	—	—	—		Slaves and Masters
1991	"Love Conquers All"	57	—	—	—	—	—	—	—	—	—	—		Slaves and Masters
1993	"Anya"^{[l]}	—	—	—	—	—	—	—	—	—	—	—		The Battle Rages On...
1993	"The Battle Rages On"	—	—	—	—	—	—	—	—	—	—	—		The Battle Rages On...
1993	"Time to Kill"^{[a]}	—	—	—	—	—	—	—	—	—	—	—		The Battle Rages On...
1994	"Anyone's Daughter" (live)^{[g]}	—	—	—	—	—	—	—	—	—	—	—		Come Hell or High Water
1996	"Sometimes I Feel Like Screaming"^{[a]}	—	—	—	—	—	—	—	—	—	—	—		Purpendicular
1996	"Aviator"^{[g]}	—	—	—	—	—	—	—	—	—	—	—		Purpendicular
2003	"Haunted"^{[a]}	—	—	—	—	—	—	—	—	—	—	—		Bananas
2011	"Hush" (live)^{[a]}	—	—	—	—	—	—	—	—	—	—	—		BBC Sessions 1968–1970
2013	"All the Time in the World"	—	—	—	—	—	—	—	—	—	—	—		Now What?!
2013	"Hell to Pay"	—	—	—	—	—	—	—	—	—	—	—		Now What?!
2013	"Vincent Price"	—	—	—	—	—	—	—	—	—	—	—		Now What?!
2013	"Above and Beyond"	—	—	—	—	—	—	—	100	—	—	—		Now What?!
2015	"Out of Hand"	—	—	—	—	—	—	—	—	—	—	—		Now What?!
2017	"Time for Bedlam"	—	—	—	—	—	—	—	—	—	—	—		Infinite
2017	"All I Got Is You"	—	—	—	—	—	—	—	—	—	—	—		Infinite
2017	"Johnny's Band"	—	—	—	—	—	—	—	—	—	—	—		Infinite
2020	"Throw My Bones"	—	—	—	—	—	—	—	—	—	—	—		Whoosh!
2020	"Man Alive"	—	—	—	—	—	—	—	—	—	—	—		Whoosh!
2020	"Nothing at All"	—	—	—	—	—	—	—	—	—		—		Whoosh!
2021	"7 and 7 Is"	—	—	—	—	—	—	—	—	—	—	—		Turning to Crime
2021	"Oh Well"	—	—	—	—	—	—	—	—	—	—	—		Turning to Crime
2021	"Rockin' Pneumonia and the Boogie Woogie Flu"	—	—	—	—	—	—	—	—	—	—	—		Turning to Crime
2024	"Portable Door"	—	—	—	—	—	—	—	—	—	—	—		=1
2024	"Pictures of You"	—	—	—	—	—	—	—	—	—	—	—		=1
2024	"Lazy Sod"	—	—	—	—	—	—	—	—	—	—	—		=1
2026	"Arrogant Boy"	—	—	—	—	—	—	—	—	—	—	—		Splat!
2026	"Diablo"	—	—	—	—	—	—	—	—	—	—	—		Splat!
"—" denotes items that did not chart or were not released in that territory.

Notes

- 1 - "Strange Kind of Woman" was featured on "Fireball" on US/Can/JPN versions of the album.
- a - released in selected EU markets.
- c - new studio version recorded in 1988.
- d - UK re-release in 1980, reached No. 43. Remixed version released in 1995 reached No. 66.
- e - released in UK/Europe.
- f - UK chart entry on Music Week's Top 75.
- g - released in Germany.
- i - released as a stand-alone single in GER and NL, instead of serving as flipside to "Black Night".
- j - released in Japan.
- k - released in France.
- l - released in Japan and Germany.
- u - released in USA/Canada.

== Videography ==
=== Video albums ===
Recorded	Released	Album title	Certifications			
Recorded	Released	Album title	Certifications	1969	1970 (TV); 1999 (VHS); 2003 (DVD)	Concerto for Group and Orchestra
1970	1970 (TV); 1990 (VHS); 2003 (DVD)	Doing Their Thing				
1972; 1972–1973	1990 (VHS); 2005 (DVD)	Scandinavian Nights – Live in Denmark 1972; Live in Concert 72/73	ARIA: Gold; RIAA: Gold; SNEP: Gold			
1974	1974 (TV); 1981 (VHS); 2005 (DVD); 2016 (Blu-ray)	California Jam – Live in California 74	SNEP: Gold			
1975	1985 (VHS); 2011 (DVD)	Rises Over Japan; Phoenix Rising				
1968–1976	2009 (DVD)	History, Hits & Highlights '68–'76				
1984	2013 (DVD)	Perfect Strangers Live				
1987	1987 (VHS)	The Video Singles				
1991	1991 (VHS); 2003 (DVD)	Heavy Metal Pioneers				
1993	1994 (VHS); 2001 (DVD)	Come Hell or High Water	BPI: Gold; ARIA: Platinum			
1995	1995 (VHS)	Bombay Calling	ARIA: Gold			
1996	2004 (DVD)	Live Encounters				
1996	2006 (DVD)	Live at Montreux 1996				
1999	1999 (DVD)	Total Abandon: Live in Australia	ARIA: Platinum			
1999	2000 (DVD)	In Concert with The London Symphony Orchestra				
1984–2000	2001 (DVD)	New Live & Rare: The Video Collection 1984–2000				
2001	2001 (DVD)	Classic Albums: Deep Purple – The Making of Machine Head	ARIA: Gold			
2001	2002 (DVD)	Perihelion	ARIA: Gold			
2002	2016 (DVD)	Live at the NEC				
2006	2007 (DVD)	They All Came Down to Montreux				
1995–2007	2008 (DVD)	Around the World Live				
2011	2011 (DVD)	Live at Montreux 2011 (with Orchestra)				
2011	2014 (DVD)	Live in Verona (with Orchestra)				
2013	2015 (DVD)	From the Setting Sun... (In Wacken)				
2014	2015 (DVD)	...To the Rising Sun (In Tokyo)				
2014	2014 (DVD)	Celebrating Jon Lord at the Royal Albert Hall (with Deep Purple, Bruce Dickinson, Glenn Hughes, Paul Weller, Rick Wakeman & Many Others)				

=== Music videos ===
Year	Title	Director	Album
1968	"Hush"		Shades of Deep Purple
1970	"Black Night"		Non-album single
1972	"Never Before"		Machine Head
1984	"Knocking at Your Back Door"		Perfect Strangers
1984	"Perfect Strangers"		Perfect Strangers
1984	"Under the Gun"		Perfect Strangers
1987	"Call of the Wild"		The House of Blue Light
1987	"Bad Attitude"		The House of Blue Light
1988	"Hush" (re-recorded)		Nobody's Perfect
1990	"King of Dreams"	James Foley	Slaves and Masters
1990	"Love Conquers All"	Storm Thorgerson	Slaves and Masters
2003	"Haunted"		Bananas
2013	"Vincent Price"		Now What?!
2017	"All I Got Is You"		Infinite
2017	"Johnny's Band"	Craig Hooper and Collin Games	Infinite
2017	"The Surprising"		Infinite
2020	"Throw My Bones"		Whoosh!
2020	"Man Alive"		Whoosh!
2020	"Nothing at All"		Whoosh!
2021	"7 and 7 Is"		Turning to Crime
2021	"Rockin' Pneumonia and the Boogie Woogie Flu"	Luke McDonnell	Turning to Crime
2021	"Oh Well"	Dan Gibling	Turning to Crime
2024	"Smoke on the Water"	Dan Gibling & Luke McDonnell	Machine Head 50th Anniversary Deluxe Edition
2024	"Portable Door"	Leo Feimer	=1
2024	"Pictures of You"	Leo Feimer	=1
2024	"Lazy Sod"	Leo Feimer	=1
2025	"Highway Star Live, Tokyo ’72"	Dan Gibling	Made in Japan
2026	"Arrogant Boy"		Splat!
2026	"Diablo"		Splat!
2026	"Guilt Trippin'"	Tom Readdy & Lucy Dawkins	Splat!
