= Listen, Learn, Read On =

Box set by Deep Purple
- Released: 8 October 2002
- Recorded: 1964–1976 (including pre-Purple material)
- Genre: Hard rock
- Length: 449:32 (7:29:32) in 6 CDs
- Label: EMI
- Producers: Derek Lawrence Mk 1 Deep Purple Mk2 Mk3 Mk4; Martin Birch Mk4

Deep Purple compilations chronology
Smoke on the Water & Other Hits (2001)	Listen, Learn, Read On (2002)	Winning Combinations: Deep Purple and Rainbow (2003)

Listen, Learn, Read On is a box set released by the English hard rock band Deep Purple in 2002.

It is a collection of 74 tracks distributed in six CDs, around a quarter of which were unreleased prior to the album; all the tracks were subject to extensive re-mastering at EMI's Abbey Road Studios. The set starts with a selection of early tracks by the members of the band before they joined Deep Purple.

The box set also houses a format book written by Deep Purple archivist Simon Robinson, which tells the band's story via 120 pages of text, pictures, cuttings, memorabilia, musician profiles and discographies.

Listen, Learn, Read On has been deleted from EMI's catalogue and is no longer in production.

== Track listing ==
All songs written by Ritchie Blackmore, Ian Gillan, Roger Glover, Jon Lord and Ian Paice except where indicated.

=== Disc one: Pre Purple and Mk 1 ===
1. "Keep a Knockin'" (Penniman) 2:34
  - The Outlaws [feat. Ritchie Blackmore]
2. "You'll Never Stop Me Loving You" (Roger Lewis) 3:28
  - M.I. Five [feat. Rod Evans, Ian Paice]
3. "Only Time Will Tell" (Lewis) 2:11
  - M.I. Five [feat. Evans, Paice]
4. "Send for That Girl" (Rowland Barter) 2:42
  - Johnny Kidd & the Pirates [feat. Nick Simper]
5. "Porcupine Juice" (Gus Dudgeon/Lord) 3:13
  - Santa Barbara Machine Head [feat. Jon Lord]
6. "I Can See Through You" (Roger Glover) 3:23
  - Episode Six [feat. Ian Gillan, Roger Glover]
7. "Mr. Universe" (Hal David/Gillan) 4:17
  - Episode Six [feat. Gillan, Glover]
8. "Medusa" (Hughes) 5:40
  - Trapeze [feat. Glenn Hughes]
9. "Does Anybody Really Know What Time It Is?" (Robert Lamm) 3:17
  - The Government [feat. David Coverdale]
10. "See My People Come Together" (Bolin) 6:07
  - Zephyr [feat. Tommy Bolin]
11. "Hush" (South) 4:13
12. "Help" (Lennon–McCartney) 6:00
13. "Shield" (Lord/Blackmore/Evans) 6:01
14. "Listen, Learn, Read On" (Blackmore/Lord/Evans/Paice) 4:00
15. "Kentucky Woman" (Neil Diamond) 4:41
16. "Playground" (Blackmore/Lord/Simper/Paice) 4:31 (The Book of Taliesyn out-take)
17. "Emmaretta" (Blackmore/Lord/Evans) 2:58 (single A-side)
18. "The Bird Has Flown" (Blackmore/Lord/Evans) 2:51 (US single B-side)

=== Disc two: Mk 1 and Mk 2 ===
1. "Why Didn't Rosemary?" (Blackmore/Lord/Evans/Simper/Paice) 5:02
2. "Hallelujah" (Greenaway/Cook) 3:40 (single A-side)
3. "Ricochet" 3:04 (BBC session 11 Aug 1969)
4. "The Bird Has Flown" (Blackmore/Lord/Evans) 3:03 (BBC session)
5. "Hush" (South) 4:16 (Live, Royal Albert Hall, 24 Sep 1969)
6. "Concerto Third Movement reprise" (Lord) 5:36 (Live, Royal Albert Hall)
7. "Wring That Neck" (Lord/Blackmore/Simper/Paice) 20:43 (Live, Montreux Casino, 4 Oct 1969)
8. "Jam Stew" 3:54 (BBC session 31 Oct 1969)
9. "Speed King" 3:23 (BBC session)
10. "Cry Free" 3:08 (Deep Purple in Rock out-take)
11. "Hard Lovin' Man" 4:12 (BBC session 21 Apr 1970)
12. "Bloodsucker" 3:14 (BBC session)
13. "Living Wreck" 2:58 (BBC session)
14. "Studio Chat / Jam" 0:40
15. "Flight of the Rat" 7:53 (95 remix)

=== Disc three: Mk 2 ===
1. "Mandrake Root" (Blackmore/Evans) 30:02 (Live, Stockholm, 12 Nov 1970)
2. "Grabsplatter" 4:30 (BBC session 23 Sep 1970)
3. "Child in Time" 10:47 (BBC session)
4. "Jon Lord Interview" 1:35
5. "Black Night" 3:28 (BBC session)
6. "Into the Fire" 3:48 (BBC session)
7. "Fools" 5:19
8. "Fireball" 3:23
9. "No One Came" 6:24
10. "Demon's Eye" 6:08 (96 remix)

=== Disc four: Mk 2 and Mk 3 ===
1. "No No No" 7:16 (Live, Beat Club, German TV Sep 1971)
2. "Highway Star" 6:08 (Live, Beat Club)
3. "Smoke on the Water" 5:49 (Quad Mix UK 1974)
4. "Never Before" 4:01 (Quad Mix)
5. "When a Blind Man Cries" 3:27 (97 remix)
6. "Strange Kind of Woman" 8:44 (BBC in Concert, Paris Theatre 9 Mar 1972)
7. "Lazy" 11:13 (Live, Tokyo, 17 Aug 1972)
8. "Black Night" 5:47 (Live, Osaka, 16 Aug 1972)
9. "Woman from Tokyo" 6:24 (99 remix)
10. "Smooth Dancer" 4:08
11. "Mary Long" 4:26 (99 remix)
12. "Burn" (Blackmore/Lord/Paice/Coverdale) 6:00
13. "Might Just Take Your Life" (Blackmore/Lord/Paice/Coverdale) 4:36

=== Disc five: Mk 3 ===
1. "Sail Away" (Blackmore/Coverdale) 5:47
2. "Coronarias Redig" (Blackmore/Lord/Paice) 4:52 (single B-side)
3. "You Fool No One" (Blackmore/Lord/Paice/Coverdale) 18:58 (Live, Ontario Speedway, 6 Apr 1974)
4. "Mistreated" (Blackmore/Coverdale) 12:02 (Live, San Diego Sports Arena, 9 Apr 1974)
5. "Space Truckin'" 29:52 (Live, Kilburn Gaumont, 22 May 1974)

=== Disc six: Mk 3 and Mk 4 ===
1. "Stormbringer" (Blackmore/Coverdale) 4:04 (Quad Mix)
2. "Soldier of Fortune" (Blackmore/Coverdale) 3:14 (Quad Mix)
3. "Hold On" (Coverdale/Hughes/Lord/Paice) 5:08 (Quad Mix)
4. "High Ball Shooter" (Blackmore/Coverdale/Hughes/Lord/Paice) 4:30 (Instrumental mix)
5. "The Gypsy" (Blackmore/Coverdale/Hughes/Lord/Paice) 5:43 (Live, Paris Palais des Sports, 7 Apr 1975)
6. "Drifter" (Bolin/Coverdale) 3:58 (California live rehearsal, June 1975)
7. "Dance to the Rock 'n' Roll" (Bolin/Coverdale/Hughes/Lord/Paice) 10:59 (California live rehearsal, Jam)
8. "This Time Around/Owed to 'G'" (Hughes/Lord; Bolin) 6:06
9. "Love Child" (Bolin/Coverdale) 3:03
10. "Wild Dogs" (Bolin/Tesar) 5:54 (Live, Tokyo Budokan, 15 Dec 1975)
11. "Lady Luck" (Cook/Coverdale) 3:24 (Live, Long Beach Arena, 27 Feb 1976)
12. "Gettin' Tighter" (Bolin/Hughes) 13:18 (Live, Long Beach Arena)
13. "You Keep on Moving" (Coverdale/Hughes) 5:18

== Personnel ==
- Mk 1: 1968-1969 – Ritchie Blackmore, Rod Evans, Nick Simper, Jon Lord, Ian Paice
- Mk 2: 1969-1973 – Ritchie Blackmore, Ian Gillan, Roger Glover, Jon Lord, Ian Paice
- Mk 3: 1973-1975 – Ritchie Blackmore, David Coverdale, Glenn Hughes, Jon Lord, Ian Paice
- Mk 4: 1975-1976 – Tommy Bolin, David Coverdale, Glenn Hughes, Jon Lord, Ian Paice
