= The Mark II Purple Singles =

Compilation album by Deep Purple
- Released: April 1979
- Recorded: 1971–1972
- Genres: Hard rock, heavy metal
- Length: 37:00
- Label: Purple
- Producer: Deep Purple

Deep Purple compilations chronology
When We Rock, We Rock, and When We Roll, We Roll (1978)	The Mark II Purple Singles (1979)	Deepest Purple: The Very Best of Deep Purple (1980)

The Mark II Purple Singles is a compilation album by Deep Purple. The album was released in 1979. It claimed to be Mark II both because it focused solely on the second line-up of the band and because it was intended as a second volume to the previous year's The Deep Purple Singles A's and B's. A version with purple vinyl is also available.

The original sleeve notes by Geoff Barton claimed that "Smoke on the Water" was a different recording to the one from Made in Japan. He wrote: "Blackmore chooses to play the solo straight, without the embellishments that, for me, marred the other officially available live version [on Made in Japan]." In fact it is the same recording, edited.

== Track listing ==
All songs written by Blackmore/Gillan/Glover/Lord/Paice.

Side one

1. "Smoke on the Water" – 5:12 (live version from Made in Japan, edited)
2. "Black Night" – 4:56 (live version recorded in Japan 1972)
3. "Child in Time" – 9:52 (live version from Made in Japan, edited)

Side two

4. "Woman from Tokyo" – 4:28 (A-side from Who Do We Think We Are, edited)
5. "Never Before" – 3:30 (A-side from Machine Head, edited)
6. "When a Blind Man Cries" – 3:29 (B-side from the Machine Head sessions)
7. "Painted Horse" – 5:18 (outtake from the Who Do We Think We Are sessions)

== Personnel ==
=== Deep Purple ===
- Ian Gillan – vocals, harmonica
- Ritchie Blackmore – guitars
- Jon Lord – organ, keyboards
- Roger Glover – bass
- Ian Paice – drums

== Charts ==
Chart (1979)	Peak position
UK Albums (Official Charts)	24
