= 24 Carat Purple =

Compilation album by Deep Purple
- Released: June 1975
- Recorded: 1969–1972
- Genres: Hard rock, heavy metal
- Length: 53:02
- Label: Purple
- Producer: Deep Purple

Deep Purple compilations chronology
Mark I & II (1973)	24 Carat Purple (1975)	Powerhouse (1977)

Singles from 24 Carat Purple
- 1. "Black Night" Released: August 1975 (Japan)

Professional ratings
Review scores
Source	Rating
Allmusic	4/5 stars

24 Carat Purple is the first compilation album of the hard rock band Deep Purple released worldwide on their own record company and the third in a long line of compilation albums. It was released in June 1975.

The live version of "Black Night", here on LP for the first time, was recorded in Japan in 1972, and originally appeared as the B-side of "Woman From Tokyo".

== Track listing ==
All tracks are written by Ritchie Blackmore, Ian Gillan, Roger Glover, Jon Lord and Ian Paice.

Side one
No.	Title	Original Album	Length
1.	"Woman from Tokyo"	Who Do We Think We Are	5:49
2.	"Fireball"	Fireball	3:26
3.	"Strange Kind of Woman" (live)	Made in Japan	9:14
4.	"Never Before"	Machine Head	4:02
5.	"Black Night" (live)	B-side single, later appeared on the 25th anniversary of Made in Japan	4:59

Side two
No.	Title	Original Album	Length
6.	"Speed King"	Deep Purple in Rock	5:52
7.	"Smoke on the Water" (live)	Made in Japan	7:29
8.	"Child in Time" (live)	Made in Japan	12:19

== Personnel ==
=== Deep Purple ===
- Ian Gillan – vocals
- Ritchie Blackmore – guitars
- Roger Glover – bass
- Jon Lord – keyboards
- Ian Paice – drums
- Martin Birch – engineer

== Charts ==
=== Weekly charts ===
Chart (1975)	Peak position
Australian Albums (Kent Music Report)	67
Austrian Albums (Ö3 Austria)	6
Dutch Albums (Album Top 100)	4
Finnish Albums (Suomen virallinen lista)	29
Italian Albums (Musica e Dischi)	18
German Albums (Offizielle Top 100)	34
Japanese Albums (Oricon)	25
New Zealand Albums (RMNZ)	35
Norwegian Albums (VG-lista)	14
UK Albums (Official Charts)	14

=== Year-end charts ===
Chart (1975)	Position
UK Albums (OCC)	46

== Certifications and sales ==
Region	Certification	Certified units/sales
Japan (RIAJ)	Gold	50,000
United Kingdom (BPI)	Silver	60,000^{^}
^{^} Shipments figures based on certification alone.
