= Deepest Purple: The Very Best of Deep Purple =

Compilation album by Deep Purple
- Released: 4 July 1980; October 2010 (30th Anniv. Edition)
- Recorded: 1970–1974; 1968–1975 (30th Anniv. Edition)
- Genres: Hard rock, heavy metal
- Length: 63:58; 79:09 (30th Anniv. Edition)
- Labels: Harvest (Europe); Warner Bros. (US)
- Producer: Deep Purple

Deep Purple compilations chronology
The Mark II Purple Singles (1979)	Deepest Purple: The Very Best of Deep Purple (1980)	The Anthology (1985)

Singles from Deepest Purple
- 1. "Black Night" Released: 18 July 1980

Professional ratings
Review scores
Source	Rating
AllMusic	4.5/5 stars
Collector's Guide to Heavy Metal	7/10
Robert Christgau	B
Smash Hits	5/10

Deepest Purple: The Very Best of Deep Purple is a compilation album by the English hard rock band Deep Purple, released in 1980 on LP. It features the original hits of Deep Purple before their 1984 reunion. Aided by a TV advertising campaign it would become Purple's third UK No. 1 album. In 1984 this compilation additionally was published on CD.

Being a 60+ minute vinyl LP, Warner Brothers Records lowered the volume considerably, as well as altering the EQ on all tracks to fit both sides equally.

This album marked the first time "Demon's Eye" was released in North America, having been replaced by "Strange Kind of Woman" on the North American release of Fireball.

All songs from this album, along with several others added, appeared on the 1998 UK album 30: Very Best of Deep Purple, released by EMI, and the 2000 US album The Very Best of Deep Purple, released by Rhino.

In 2010 a 30th Anniversary Edition of this compilation was released (25 October in the UK and 2 November in the US). It contains four additional tracks, two of them from the Mark I & IV eras, plus a bonus DVD containing previously unreleased video footage and an exclusive track-by-track commentary from founding member Jon Lord.

== Track listing ==
All titles composed by Ritchie Blackmore, Ian Gillan, Roger Glover, Jon Lord, Ian Paice, except where indicated.

Side one

1. "Black Night" – 3:28 (7-inch single, 1970)
2. "Speed King" (Edited version) – 5:04 (from the album Deep Purple in Rock, 1970)
3. "Fireball" – 3:25 (from the album Fireball, 1971)
4. "Strange Kind of Woman" – 3:52 (7-inch single, 1971)
5. "Child in Time" – 10:20 (from the album Deep Purple in Rock)
6. "Woman from Tokyo" – 5:51 (from the album Who Do We Think We Are, 1973)

Side two

7. "Highway Star" – 6:07 (from the album Machine Head, 1972)
8. "Space Truckin'" – 4:33 (from the album Machine Head)
9. "Burn" (Blackmore, David Coverdale, Glenn Hughes, Lord, Paice) – 6:02 (from the album Burn, 1974)
10. "Stormbringer" (Blackmore, Coverdale) – 4:06 (from the album Stormbringer, 1974)
11. "Demon's Eye" – 5:22 (from the album Fireball)
12. "Smoke on the Water" – 5:40 (from the album Machine Head)

== 30th Anniversary Edition ==
=== CD track listing ===
All titles composed by Ritchie Blackmore, Ian Gillan, Roger Glover, Jon Lord, Ian Paice, except where indicated

1. "Black Night" (Single version) – 3:27 (2002 Digital Remaster)
2. "Speed King" (Edited version) – 5:00 (2010 Digital Remaster)
3. "Fireball" – 3:23 (1996 Digital Remaster)
4. "Hush" (Joe South) – 4:13 (1998 Digital Remaster)
5. "Strange Kind of Woman" – 3:51 (2002 Digital Remaster)
6. "Child in Time" – 10:15 (1995 Digital Remaster)
7. "When a Blind Man Cries" – 3:30 (1997 Remix)
8. "Woman from Tokyo" – 5:49 (2000 Digital Remaster)
9. "Highway Star" – 6:07 (1997 Digital Remaster)
10. "Space Truckin'" – 4:33 (1997 Digital Remaster)
11. "Burn" (Blackmore, David Coverdale, Glenn Hughes, Lord, Paice) – 6:02 (2004 Digital Remaster)
12. "Stormbringer" (Blackmore, Coverdale) – 4:06 (2009 Digital Remaster)
13. "Soldier of Fortune" (Blackmore, Coverdale) – 3:15 (2009 Digital Remaster)
14. "Demon's Eye" – 5:19 (1996 Digital Remaster)
15. "You Keep on Moving" (Single edit) (Coverdale, Hughes) – 4:28 (2002 Digital Remaster)
16. "Smoke on the Water" – 5:40 (1997 Digital Remaster)

Note: Track 11, "Burn", falsely is declared as single edit on the CD-case inlay. In fact it is the album version.

=== DVD ===
1. "Jon Lord discusses 'Hush'"
2. "Hush (Playboy After Dark, 1968)"
3. "Jon Lord discusses arriving in the US for the first time"
4. "Jon Lord discusses miming for German TV"
5. "'Speed King' (Vicky Leandros show, German TV, 1970)"
6. "Jon Lord discusses the writing of 'Child in Time'"
7. "Child in Time (new clip)"
8. "Jon Lord discusses the power of 'Child in Time'"
9. "Jon Lord discusses the recording of 'Black Night'"
10. "'Black Night' (Classic 1970 video clip)"
11. "Jon Lord discusses 'Fireball'"
12. "'Fireball' (German TV performance on Disco ZDF, 1971)"
13. "Jon Lord discusses the Fireball album"
14. "Jon Lord discusses the writing of 'Strange Kind of Woman'"
15. "'Strange Kind of Woman' (Top of the Pops, BBC, 1971)"
16. "Jon Lord discusses 'Demon's Eye'"
17. "'Demon's Eye' (Music Today, RBB Berlin)"
18. "Jon Lord discusses 'Highway Star'"
19. "'Highway Star' (Beat Club, German TV, 1971)"
20. "Jon Lord discusses 'Never Before'"
21. "'Never Before' (Classic 1970s video clip)"
22. "Jon Lord discusses 'Smoke on the Water' and the story behind it"
23. "'Smoke on the Water' (Hofstra University, 1973)"
24. "Jon Lord discusses the choice of singles"
25. "Jon Lord discusses 'Woman From Tokyo'"
26. "'Woman from Tokyo' (New clip)"
27. "'Made in Japan' / 'Space Truckin' (New clip from Made in Japan footage)"
28. "Jon Lord discusses 'Burn'"
29. "'Burn' (California Jam, 1974)"
30. "Jon Lord discusses 'You Keep on Moving'"
31. "'You Keep on Moving'"
32. "Jon Lord discusses 'Stormbringer'"
33. "'Stormbringer' (New clip)"

== Personnel ==
All songs are performed by Deep Purple in different line-ups (Mark I–IV). The track numbers in the following listing correspond to the 30th Anniversary Edition CD.

On Tracks 1–3, 5–10, 14 & 16: Deep Purple Mark II

- Ritchie Blackmore – guitars
- Ian Gillan – vocals
- Roger Glover – bass
- Jon Lord – organ, keyboards
- Ian Paice – drums, percussion

On Track 4: Deep Purple Mark I

- Ritchie Blackmore – guitars
- Rod Evans – lead vocals
- Jon Lord – hammond organ, backing vocals
- Ian Paice – drums, percussion
- Nick Simper – bass, backing vocals

On Tracks 11–13: Deep Purple Mark III

- Ritchie Blackmore – guitars
- David Coverdale – lead vocals
- Glenn Hughes – bass, vocals
- Jon Lord – keyboards
- Ian Paice – drums, percussion

On Track 15: Deep Purple Mark IV

- Tommy Bolin – guitars
- David Coverdale – lead vocals
- Glenn Hughes – bass, vocals
- Jon Lord – keyboards
- Ian Paice – drums, percussion

Original album compiled by EMI in conjunction with Ian Paice and mastered by Nick Webb at Abbey Road Studios.

== Charts ==
Chart (1980)	Peak position
Australian Albums (Kent Music Report)	5
Canada Top Albums/CDs (RPM)	78
Japanese Albums (Oricon)	32
UK Albums (Official Charts)	1
US Billboard 200	148

== Certifications ==
Region	Certification	Certified units/sales
Australia (ARIA)	Platinum	50,000^{^}
Austria (IFPI Austria)	Gold	25,000^{*}
Germany (BVMI)	Gold	250,000^{^}
United Kingdom (BPI)	Gold	100,000^{^}
United States (RIAA)	Platinum	1,000,000^{^}
^{*} Sales figures based on certification alone.^{^} Shipments figures based on certification alone.

== Accolades ==
Publication	Country	Accolade	Year	Rank
Creem	United States	"Annual Reader Poll – Best Reissue"	1980	6
