= The Very Best of Deep Purple =

Greatest hits album by Deep Purple
- Released: 9 May 2000
- Recorded: 1968–1974, 1984
- Genre: Hard rock, heavy metal
- Length: 79:02
- Label: Rhino, Warner Bros.
- Producer: Deep Purple, Derek Lawrence, Martin Birch, Roger Glover

Deep Purple compilations chronology
Shades 1968–1998 (1998)	The Very Best of Deep Purple (2000)	Days May Come and Days May Go (2000)

Professional ratings
Review scores
Source	Rating
AllMusic	4.5/5 stars
Sputnikmusic	4/5 stars

The Very Best of Deep Purple is a single disc compilation album by the English hard rock band Deep Purple. It was released in 2000 by Rhino Records/Warner Bros. Records. It features tracks by the Mk. I, Mk. II and Mk. III line-ups of Deep Purple.

== Production ==
This compilation is supposed to be a single disc alternative to the more comprehensive Shades four-disc collection. All the tracks were remastered simultaneously for inclusion in both sets. The set is essentially a new version of previous compilation Deepest Purple: The Very Best of Deep Purple, which was released in 1980, with three additional songs, two from Mk. I and one from the reunited Mk. II. The disc bypasses the material from the Mk. IV line-up, and features slightly different versions of a few of the tracks.

== Track listing ==
All tracks written by Ritchie Blackmore, Ian Gillan, Roger Glover, Jon Lord and Ian Paice, except where noted

No.	Title	Place of Origin	Length
1.	"Hush" (Joe South)	Shades of Deep Purple – 1968	4:26
2.	"Kentucky Woman" (Edited mono single version; Neil Diamond)	The Book of Taliesyn – 1968	4:14
3.	"Black Night"	Non-album single – 1970	3:27
4.	"Speed King" (US album version)	Deep Purple in Rock – 1970	4:21
5.	"Child in Time"	Deep Purple in Rock	10:19
6.	"Strange Kind of Woman" (US album version)	Fireball (US version) – 1971	4:02
7.	"Fireball"	Fireball	3:24
8.	"Demon's Eye"	Fireball	5:20
9.	"Highway Star"	Machine Head – 1972	6:09
10.	"Smoke on the Water"	Machine Head	5:41
11.	"Space Truckin'"	Machine Head	4:34
12.	"Woman from Tokyo"	Who Do We Think We Are – 1973	5:49
13.	"Burn" (Blackmore, David Coverdale, Glenn Hughes, Paice, Lord)	Burn – 1974	6:01
14.	"Stormbringer" (Blackmore, Coverdale)	Stormbringer – 1974	4:08
15.	"Knocking at Your Back Door" (Blackmore, Gillan, Glover)	Perfect Strangers – 1984	7:07

== Personnel ==
- Ritchie Blackmore – guitars
- Ian Gillan – lead vocals
- Roger Glover – bass guitar
- Ian Paice – drums
- Jon Lord – organ, keyboards, backing vocals on tracks 1–2
- Rod Evans – vocals on tracks 1–2
- Nick Simper – bass, backing vocals on tracks 1–2
- David Coverdale – lead vocals on tracks 13–14
- Glenn Hughes – bass, vocals on tracks 13–14

== Year-end charts ==
Year-end chart performance for The Very Best of Deep Purple
Chart (2002)	Position
Canadian Metal Albums (Nielsen SoundScan)	83
