= Shades 1968–1998 =

Box set by Deep Purple
- Released: 16 March 1999
- Recorded: March 1968 – May 1998
- Genres: Hard rock, heavy metal, progressive rock
- Label: Rhino

Deep Purple compilations chronology
Smoke on the Water (1998)	Shades 1968–1998 (1999)	The Very Best of Deep Purple (2000)

Professional ratings
Review scores
Source	Rating
AllMusic	4.5/5 stars
Collector's Guide to Heavy Metal	9/10

Shades 1968–1998 is a 4-CD box set by the English hard rock band Deep Purple. It was released on 16 March 1999. It spans their career from 1968 to 1998. This box set contains rare edits and singles which are remastered along with album versions of their biggest hits.

== Track listing ==
=== Disc one: 1968–1971 ===
1. "Hush" – 4:27
2. "Help!" – 6:03
3. "Shadows" (1968 Demo) – 3:30
4. "Love Help Me" (1968 Instrumental Demo) – 3:25
5. "Kentucky Woman" (Single Version) – 4:14
6. "Anthem" – 6:32
7. "River Deep, Mountain High" (Single Version) – 2:37
8. "Emmaretta" – 3:00
9. "Bird Has Flown" (Single Version) – 2:53
10. "Hallelujah" – 3:47
11. "Speed King" (Full Length UK Version) – 5:53
12. "Child in Time" – 10:21
13. "Cry Free" (Roger Glover remix) – 3:23
14. "Black Night" (Full Length UK Version) – 3:27
15. "Jam Stew" (1970 Outtake) – 2:33
16. "Into the Fire" (Live 10/24/1970) – 4:20
17. "No No No" (Live 9/1971) – 7:16

=== Disc two: 1971 – 1972 ===
1. "Strange Kind of Woman" – 4:03
2. "I'm Alone" – 3:04
3. "Fireball" – 3:24
4. "Demon's Eye" – 5:21
5. "Anyone's Daughter" – 4:45
6. "Fools" – 8:19
7. "No One Came" – 6:27
8. "Freedom" (1971 Outtake) – 3:36
9. "Slow Train" (1971 Outtake) – 5:35
10. "Never Before" – 4:02
11. "When a Blind Man Cries" – 3:34
12. "Highway Star" – 6:09
13. "Smoke on the Water" – 5:42
14. "Pictures of Home" – 5:07
15. "Space Truckin'" – 4:35
16. "Painted Horse" (1972 Outtake) – 5:15

=== Disc three: 1972 – 1976 ===
1. "Smoke on the Water" (Live 8/15/1972) – 7:13
2. "Lazy" (Live 8/17/1972) – 10:34
3. "Woman from Tokyo" – 5:50
4. "Mary Long" – 4:26
5. "Super Trouper" – 2:56
6. "Smooth Dancer" – 4:11
7. "Burn" – 6:02
8. "Might Just Take Your Life" – 4:39
9. "Sail Away" – 5:51
10. "Coronarias Redig" – 4:55
11. "Stormbringer" – 4:08
12. "Hold On" – 5:09
13. "Lady Double Dealer" (Live 4/5/1975) – 4:17
14. "Gettin' Tighter" – 3:37
15. "Comin' Home" – 3:53

=== Disc four: 1984 – 1998 ===
1. "Knocking at Your Back Door" – 7:07
2. "Perfect Strangers" – 5:28
3. "Son of Alerik" (7″ Single Version) – 5:28
4. "Call of the Wild" – 4:53
5. "Bad Attitude" (Single Version) – 4:03
6. "Hard Lovin' Woman" (Live 8/22/1987) – 4:05
7. "Hush '88" (Live 2/26/1988) – 3:32
8. "King of Dreams" (Single Version) – 4:50
9. "Fire in the Basement" – 4:43
10. "Slow Down Sister" – 5:58
11. "The Battle Rages On" – 5:57
12. "Anya" (Live 10/16/1993) – 12:11
13. "A Castle Full of Rascals" – 5:11
14. "Seventh Heaven" – 5:23

== Personnel ==
- Mk 1: 1968–1969 – Ritchie Blackmore, Rod Evans, Jon Lord, Ian Paice, Nick Simper
- Mk 2: 1969–1973 – Ritchie Blackmore, Ian Gillan, Roger Glover, Jon Lord, Ian Paice
- Mk 3: 1973–1975 – Ritchie Blackmore, David Coverdale, Glenn Hughes, Jon Lord, Ian Paice
- Mk 4: 1975–1976 – Tommy Bolin, David Coverdale, Glenn Hughes, Jon Lord, Ian Paice
- Mk 2 (reunion): 1984–1989 – Ritchie Blackmore, Ian Gillan, Roger Glover, Jon Lord, Ian Paice
- Mk 5: 1989–1992 – Ritchie Blackmore, Roger Glover, Jon Lord, Ian Paice, Joe Lynn Turner
- Mk 2 (second reunion): 1992–1993 – Ritchie Blackmore, Ian Gillan, Roger Glover, Jon Lord, Ian Paice
- Mk 6: 1993–1994 – Ian Gillan, Roger Glover, Jon Lord, Ian Paice, Joe Satriani
- Mk 7: 1994–2002 – Ian Gillan, Roger Glover, Jon Lord, Steve Morse, Ian Paice
