= Powerhouse (Deep Purple album) =

Compilation album of live recordings and studio outtakes by Deep Purple
- Released: December 1977 (EU); January 1978 (UK)
- Recorded: 1969–1972
- Genres: Hard rock, heavy metal
- Length: 44:00
- Label: Purple
- Producer: Deep Purple

Deep Purple compilations chronology
24 Carat Purple (1975)	Powerhouse (1977)	The Deep Purple Singles A's and B's (1978)

Powerhouse is a 1977 compilation album by Deep Purple, featuring previously unreleased live and studio tracks from the band's Mark II line-up at the height of its powers. The album achieved Gold Certification in Japan.

== Track listing ==
All songs written by Ritchie Blackmore, Ian Gillan, Roger Glover, Jon Lord and Ian Paice, except where indicated.

Side 1
No.	Title	Track source	Length
1.	"Painted Horse"	Who Do We Think We Are outtake	5:19
2.	"Hush (Live)" (Joe South)	Concerto for Group and Orchestra	4:37
3.	"Wring That Neck (Live)" (Blackmore, Lord, Paice, Nick Simper)	Concerto for Group and Orchestra	12:51

Side 2
No.	Title	Track source	Length
4.	"Child in Time (Live)"	Concerto for Group and Orchestra	12:29
5.	"Black Night (Live)"	Made in Japan recordings	4:59
6.	"Cry Free"	Deep Purple in Rock outtake	3:11

== Personnel ==
Deep Purple

- Ian Gillan – vocals, harmonica
- Ritchie Blackmore – guitars
- Jon Lord – keyboards
- Roger Glover – bass
- Ian Paice – drums, percussion

== Charts ==
Chart (1977–1978)	Peak position
Australian Albums (Kent Music Report)	54
German Albums (Offizielle Top 100)	50
Japanese Albums (Oricon)	30

== Certifications ==
Region	Certification	Certified units/sales
Japan (RIAJ)	Gold	100,000^{^}
^{^} Shipments figures based on certification alone.
