= The Anthology (Deep Purple album) =

Compilation album by Deep Purple
- Released: 17 June 1985; March 1991 (second edition)
- Recorded: 1968–1975
- Genres: Hard rock, heavy metal
- Length: 151:36
- Label: Harvest

Deep Purple compilations chronology
Deepest Purple: The Very Best of Deep Purple (1980)	The Anthology (1985)	Knocking at Your Back Door: The Best of Deep Purple in the 80's (1992)

1991 CD edition cover

Professional ratings
Review scores
Source	Rating
AllMusic	3/5 stars
Collector's Guide to Heavy Metal	3/10

The Anthology is a compilation album by the English hard rock band Deep Purple, containing material by Mks I (1968–1969), II (1969–1973), III (1973–1975) and IV (1975–1976) line-ups. It was released as a double vinyl album and double-cassette, and included a few previously unreleased tracks and mixes. The sleeve-notes were written by Chris Charlesworth, author of Deep Purple – The Illustrated Biography.

This compilation was never re-issued on CD: a 2-CD set, released by EMI in 1991, was also titled Anthology, but featured different songs and only previously released material.

== Track listing ==
=== 1985 vinyl version ===
Side one

1. "Hush" (Joe South) – 4:24
2. "Emmaretta" (Jon Lord, Ritchie Blackmore, Rod Evans) – 4:28
3. "Hallelujah" (Roger Greenaway, Roger Cook) – 3:42
4. "Shadows" (Blackmore, Lord, Evans, Nick Simper, Ian Paice) – 3:29 (Previously unreleased track from the Shades of Deep Purple sessions in 1968)
5. "Love Help Me" (Blackmore, Evans) – 3:23 (Previously unreleased instrumental version)
6. "Wring That Neck" (Lord, Blackmore, Simper, Paice) – 4:12

Side two

1. "Speed King" (Blackmore, Ian Gillan, Roger Glover, Lord, Paice) – 6:53
2. "Black Night" (Blackmore, Gillan, Glover, Lord, Paice) – 3:27
3. "Grabsplatter" (Blackmore, Gillan, Glover, Lord, Paice) – 4:34 (Instrumental jam from a BBC session in 1970)
4. "Child in Time" (Edited version) (Blackmore, Gillan, Glover, Lord, Paice) – 9:16

Side three

1. "Strange Kind of Woman" (Blackmore, Gillan, Glover, Lord, Paice) – 4:50
2. "Freedom" (Blackmore, Gillan, Glover, Lord, Paice) – 3:31 (Previously unreleased track from the Fireball sessions in 1971)
3. "Fireball" (Blackmore, Gillan, Glover, Lord, Paice) – 3:24
4. "Highway Star" (Blackmore, Gillan, Glover, Lord, Paice) – 6:07
5. "Never Before" (Blackmore, Gillan, Glover, Lord, Paice) – 4:00 (A different (quadrophonic) mix, from the ordinary album version)
6. "When a Blind Man Cries" (Blackmore, Gillan, Glover, Lord, Paice) – 3:30

Side four

1. "Smoke on the Water" (Blackmore, Gillan, Glover, Lord, Paice) – 6:38 (A different (quadrophonic) mix, from the ordinary album version)
2. "Woman from Tokyo" (Blackmore, Gillan, Glover, Lord, Paice) – 5:49
3. "Might Just Take Your Life" (Blackmore, Lord, Paice, David Coverdale) – 4.39
4. "Coronarias Redig" (Blackmore, Lord, Paice) – 4:51
5. "Soldier of Fortune" (Blackmore, Coverdale) – 3:15
6. "You Keep on Moving" (Coverdale, Glenn Hughes) – 4:17

=== 1991 CD version ===
CD one

1. "Hush" – 4:25
2. "Mandrake Root" (Blackmore, Evans, Lord) – 6:08
3. "Shield" (Lord, Blackmore, Evans) – 6:03
4. "Wring That Neck" – 5:13
5. "The Bird Has Flown" (Evans, Backmore, Lord) – 5:36
6. "Bloodsucker" (Blackmore, Gillan, Glover, Lord, Paice) – 4:08
7. "Speed King" – 5:53
8. "Black Night" – 3:27
9. "Child in Time" – 10:16
10. "Fireball" – 3:23
11. "Strange Kind of Woman" – 8:35 (Live version taken from Deep Purple in Concert, 1980)
12. "No One Came" (Blackmore, Gillan, Glover, Lord, Paice) – 6:25
13. "Highway Star" – 6:06

CD two

1. "Smoke on the Water" – 7:01 (live version taken from Made in Japan, 1972)
2. "Pictures of Home" – 5:03
3. "Woman from Tokyo" – 5:50
4. "Smooth Dancer" (Blackmore, Gillan, Glover, Lord, Paice) – 4:09
5. "Sail Away" (Blackmore, Lord, Paice, Coverdale) – 5:48
6. "Lay Down Stay Down" (Blackmore, Lord, Paice, Coverdale) – 4:15
7. "Burn" (Blackmore, Lord, Paice, Coverdale) – 6:50 (Live version taken from Live in London, 1982)
8. "Stormbringer" (Blackmore, Coverdale) – 4:05
9. "Hold On" (Coverdale, Hughes, Lord, Paice) – 5:05
10. "Gypsy" (Blackmore, Lord, Paice, Coverdale, Hughes) – 4:13
11. "Mistreated" (Blackmore, Coverdale) – 11:40 (Live version taken from Made in Europe, 1976)
12. "Gettin' Tighter" (Tommy Bolin, Hughes) – 3:36
13. "Love Child" (Bolin, Coverdale) – 3:05
14. "You Keep on Moving" – 5:18

== Credits ==
=== Deep Purple ===
Mk. I

- Ritchie Blackmore – guitars
- Rod Evans – lead vocals
- Jon Lord – organ, keyboards, backing vocals
- Ian Paice – drums
- Nick Simper – bass, backing vocals

Mk. II

- Ritchie Blackmore – guitars
- Ian Gillan – vocals
- Roger Glover – bass
- Jon Lord – organ, keyboards
- Ian Paice – drums

Mk. III

- Ritchie Blackmore – guitars
- David Coverdale – lead vocals
- Glenn Hughes – bass guitar, vocals
- Jon Lord – organ, keyboards
- Ian Paice – drums

Mk. IV

- Tommy Bolin: guitars, vocals.
- David Coverdale: lead vocals
- Glenn Hughes: bass, vocals
- Jon Lord: keyboards
- Ian Paice: drums

== Production credits ==
- Digitally remastered at Abbey Road Studios, London by Peter Vince
- Photography: Fin Costello and Richard Imrie

== Charts ==
Chart (1985)	Peak position
UK Albums (Official Charts)	50

Chart (1991)	Peak position
Dutch Albums (Album Top 100)	86
