= BBC Sessions 1968–1970 =

Live album by Deep Purple
- Released: 7 November 2011
- Recorded: 18 June 1968 – 23 September 1970
- Genres: Progressive rock, psychedelic rock, hard rock, heavy metal
- Length: 98:28
- Label: EMI

Deep Purple live albums chronology
Live at Montreux 2011 (2011)	BBC Sessions 1968–1970 (2011)	Copenhagen 1972 (2013)

BBC Sessions 1968–1970 is a 2011 live compilation album featuring performances by the English hard rock band Deep Purple that were recorded at the BBC's Maida Vale Studios, London, and originally broadcast on various BBC Radio shows from 1968 through 1970. BBC Sessions 1968–1970 is a two-disc set collecting all the surviving sessions in the BBC archives. Deep Purple in Concert collects two concerts also recorded by the BBC.

== Track listing ==
All songs written by Ritchie Blackmore, Ian Gillan, Roger Glover, Jon Lord and Ian Paice except where noted.

Disc 1: Mark I
No.	Title	Recording source	Length
1.	"Hush" (Joe South)	Top Gear – 18 June 1968 †	4:07
2.	"One More Rainy Day" (Lord, Evans)	Top Gear – 18 June 1968 †	2:56
3.	"Help!" (Lennon/McCartney)	Top Gear – 18 June 1968 †	5:38
4.	"And the Address" (Blackmore, Lord)	Dave Symonds Show – 25 June 1968 †	2:06
5.	"Hey Bop a Re Bop" (Evans, Blackmore, Lord, Paice)	Top Gear – 14 January 1969	3:31
6.	"Emmaretta" (Evans, Blackmore, Lord)	Top Gear – 14 January 1969	3:08
7.	"Wring That Neck" (Blackmore, Simper, Lord, Paice)	Top Gear – 14 January 1969	4:42
8.	"Brian Matthew Interviews Rod Evans"	Top Gear – 8 January 1969	1:27
9.	"Hey Joe" (Billy Roberts)	Top Gear – 14 January 1969	4:02
10.	"It’s All Over" (Ben E. King, Bert Berns)	Top Gear – 14 January 1969	4:14
11.	"The Painter" (Evans, Blackmore, Simper, Lord, Paice)	Sounds Like Tony Brandon Show – 24 June 1969	2:18
12.	"Laléna" (Donovan)	Sounds Like Tony Brandon Show – 24 June 1969	3:33
13.	"The Painter" (Evans, Blackmore, Simper, Lord, Paice)	Chris Grant’s Tasty Pop Sundae – 30 June 1969	2:43
14.	"I'm So Glad" (Skip James)	Chris Grant’s Tasty Pop Sundae – 30 June 1969	3:12
15.	"Hush" (Joe South)	Chris Grant’s Tasty Pop Sundae – 30 June 1969	2:28

Disc 2: Mark II
No.	Title	Recording source	Length
1.	"Ricochet"	Symonds on Sunday Show – 11 August 1969	3:07
2.	"The Bird Has Flown" (Evans, Blackmore, Lord)	Symonds on Sunday Show – 11 August 1969	3:05
3.	"Speed King"	Stuart Henry Noise at Nine – 31 October 1969	3:25
4.	"Jam Stew (aka John Stew)"	Stuart Henry Noise at Nine – 31 October 1969	3:56
5.	"Hard Lovin' Man"	Sounds of the 70s – 21 April 1970	4:13
6.	"Bloodsucker"	Sounds of the 70s – 21 April 1970	3:18
7.	"Living Wreck"	Sounds of the 70s – 21 April 1970	3:25
8.	"Jon Lord Interview"	Transcription Services – 23 September 1970	1:35
9.	"Black Night"	Transcription Services – 23 September 1970	3:29
10.	"Grabsplatter"	Transcription Services – 23 September 1970	4:33
11.	"Into the Fire"	Transcription Services – 23 September 1970	3:49
12.	"Child in Time"	Transcription Services – 23 September 1970	10:48

† indicates previously unreleased material

- Disc 1, Tracks 5, 7 and 10 first released on a re-issue of The Book of Taliesyn (EMI 72435 21608 2 2, 2000)
- Disc 1, Tracks 6, 11 and 12 first released on a re-issue of Deep Purple (EMI 72435 21597 2 7, 2000)
- Disc 1, Track 9 first released on a re-issue of Shades of Deep Purple (EMI 72434 98336 2 3, 2000)
- Disc 2, Tracks 1–9 and 11–12 first released on Listen, Learn, Read On boxed set (EMI 72435 40973 2 4, 2002)
- Disc 2, Track 10 first released on The Anthology (Harvest EN 26 0612 3, 1985)

== Personnel ==
Deep Purple

- Ritchie Blackmore – guitars
- Jon Lord – organ, keyboards, backing vocals
- Ian Paice – drums
- Rod Evans – lead vocals - (Disc one)
- Nick Simper – bass, backing vocals - (Disc one)
- Ian Gillan – vocals - (Disc two)
- Roger Glover – bass - (Disc two)
- Digitally remastered by Peter Mew at Abbey Road Studios, London specifically for this set.

== Charts ==
Year	Chart	Position
2011	Germany	94
