= The Deep Purple Singles A's and B's =

The Deep Purple Singles A's & B's

Greatest hits album by Deep Purple
- Released: October 1978 (Harvest); January 1993 (EMI)
- Recorded: 1968–1975
- Genres: Hard rock, heavy metal
- Length: 47:25 (1978 LP); 77:06 (1993 CD edition)
- Labels: Harvest (1978); EMI (1993)
- Producers: Derek Lawrence, Deep Purple

Deep Purple compilations chronology
Powerhouse (1977)	The Deep Purple Singles A's & B's (1978)	When We Rock, We Rock, and When We Roll, We Roll (1978)

Singles A's and B's (1993) cover

Singles from Singles A's and B's
- 1. "Black Night" Released: 16 March 1979

The Deep Purple Singles A's & B's is a compilation album of singles released by the English hard rock band Deep Purple. It was released on vinyl in October 1978. An updated version of the album was issued on CD in 1993 and contains the complete collection of Deep Purple's UK singles, recorded and released from 1968 to 1976 by the Mk I, II, III and IV line-ups of Deep Purple. In 2010 EMI released another double CD compilation album called Singles & E.P. Anthology '68 – '80. It contains all songs as herein plus 15 tracks. The song "Kentucky Woman" is present in the album version, which is 38 seconds longer than the single edit.

== Track listings ==
All songs written by Blackmore/Gillan/Glover/Lord/Paice except where indicated.

=== 1978 vinyl version ===
Side one

1. "Hush" (South) – 4:25
2. "One More Rainy Day" (Lord/Evans) – 3:38
3. "Emmaretta" (Lord/Blackmore/Evans) – 2:59
4. "Wring That Neck" (Lord/Blackmore/Simper/Paice) – 5:12 (Paice's name is misspelt "Price" on the vinyl release)
5. "Hallelujah" (Greenaway/Cook) – 3:42
6. "April" part 1 (Blackmore/Lord) – 3:57

Side two

7. "Black Night" – 3:27
8. "Speed King" – 4:25 (Demo version with piano)
9. "Strange Kind of Woman" – 3:47
10. "I'm Alone" – 3:05 (B-side from the "Strange Kind of Woman" single)
11. "Demon's Eye" – 5:12
12. "Fireball" – 3:23

=== 1993 CD version ===
1. "Hush" (Joe South) – 4:24
2. "One More Rainy Day" (Lord/Evans) – 3:38
3. "Kentucky Woman" (single edit) (Neil Diamond) – 4:04
4. "Emmaretta" (Blackmore/Evans/Lord) – 3:00
5. "The Bird Has Flown" (single edit) (Blackmore/Evans/Lord) – 2:54
6. "Hallelujah" (Greenaway/Cook) – 3:44
7. "Speed King" (demo version with piano) – 4:26
8. "Black Night" – 3:28
9. "Strange Kind of Woman" – 3:49
10. "I'm Alone" – 3:06
11. "Fireball" – 3:21
12. "Demon's Eye" – 5:12
13. "Never Before" (single edit) – 3:30
14. "When a Blind Man Cries" – 3:32
15. "Smoke on the Water" (single edit) – 3:48
16. "Black Night" (live, from the Made in Japan outtakes, also available in the 2-CD remastered deluxe edition of Made in Japan) – 4:59
17. "Might Just Take Your Life" (single edit) (Blackmore/Lord/Coverdale/Paice) – 3:35
18. "Coronarias Redig" (Blackmore/Lord/Paice) – 4:54
19. "You Keep on Moving" (single edit) (Coverdale/Hughes) – 4:29
20. "Love Child" (Bolin/Coverdale) – 3:04

== Credits ==
=== Deep Purple ===
- Ritchie Blackmore – guitars: tracks 1–18
- Ian Gillan – vocals, harmonica : tracks 6–16
- Roger Glover – bass guitar : tracks 6–16
- Jon Lord – organ, keyboards, backing vocals
- Ian Paice – drums
- Rod Evans – lead vocals : tracks 1–5
- Nick Simper – bass guitar, backing vocals : tracks 1–5
- David Coverdale – lead vocals : tracks 17–20
- Glenn Hughes – bass guitar, vocals : tracks 17–20
- Tommy Bolin – guitars : tracks 19–20
- 1993 version compiled by Simon Robinson of the DPAS

== Charts ==
Chart (1993)	Peak position
German Albums (Offizielle Top 100)	78
