= When We Rock, We Rock, and When We Roll, We Roll =

- Cover art by Shusei Nagaoka

Greatest hits album by Deep Purple
- Released: October 1978
- Recorded: 1968–1974
- Genres: Hard rock, heavy metal
- Length: 43:10
- Label: Warner Bros.
- Producers: Deep Purple, Derek Lawrence

Deep Purple compilations chronology
| The Singles A's and B's (1978) | When We Rock, We Rock, and When We Roll, We Roll (1978) | The Mark II Purple Singles (1979) |

When We Rock, We Rock, and When We Roll, We Roll is a compilation album by Deep Purple featuring some of their most popular songs from 1968 to 1974.

The LP was released in October 1978 by Warner Bros. Records in North America and Japan only, as counterpart to The Deep Purple Singles A's and B's, which was simultaneously released in other markets. It was compiled by Dennis C. Nicklos.

Professional ratings
Review scores
| Source | Rating |
|---|---|
| AllMusic | link |

== Track listing ==
All songs written by Blackmore/Gillan/Glover/Lord/Paice except where indicated.

=== Side one ===
1. "Space Truckin'" – 4:31
2. "Kentucky Woman" (Neil Diamond) – 4:44
3. "Hard Road (Wring That Neck)" (Blackmore/Lord/Paice/Simper) – 5:11
4. "Burn" (Blackmore/Lord/Paice/Coverdale) – 6:00

=== Side two ===
5. "Woman from Tokyo" – 5:30 (Listed as a live recording, but is actually the studio version)
6. "Hush" (Joe South) – 4:25
7. "Smoke on the Water" – 6:27 (Live)
8. "Highway Star" (Live) – 6:47

== Credits ==
- Ian Gillan – lead vocals
- Ritchie Blackmore – guitars
- Jon Lord – organ, keyboards, backing vocals
- Roger Glover – bass guitar
- Ian Paice – drums
- Rod Evans – lead vocals on track 2 and 6
- Nick Simper – bass guitar, backing vocals on track 2, 3, 6
- David Coverdale – lead vocals on track 4
- Glenn Hughes – bass guitar, vocals on track 4
