= Live in Verona (Deep Purple album) =

- Cover of the DVD release
- Starring: Deep Purple
- Music by: Deep Purple with orchestra
- Distributed by: Eagle Rock Entertainment; Ward Records
- Release date: 2014
- Running time: 115 minutes

Live in Verona is a 2014 live album and concert film by English hard rock band Deep Purple's mk VIII lineup credited as Deep Purple with Orchestra, and performed alongside the Neue Philharmonie Frankfurt conducted by Stephen Bentley-Klein. It was recorded at the Arena di Verona, a Roman amphitheater originally built in 30 AD, on 18 July 2011. It was released as a Blu-ray and DVD on 21 October 2014 by Eagle Rock Entertainment, and as a CD in Japan on 8 October 2014 by Ward Records.

== Track listing ==
All songs written by Ritchie Blackmore, Ian Gillan, Roger Glover, Jon Lord, and Ian Paice except where noted.

=== DVD / Blu Ray ===
1. "Deep Purple Overture"
2. "Highway Star"
3. "Hard Lovin' Man"
4. "Maybe I'm a Leo"
5. "Strange Kind of Woman"
6. "Rapture of the Deep"
7. "Woman from Tokyo"
8. "Contact Lost"
9. "When a Blind Man Cries"
10. "The Well-Dressed Guitar"
11. "Knocking at Your Back Door"
12. "Lazy"
13. "No One Came"
14. Don Airey solo
15. "Perfect Strangers"
16. "Space Truckin’"
17. "Smoke on the Water"
18. "Hush" – Bonus feature
19. "Black Night" – Bonus feature
20. "Hush" (South)
21. "Black Night"

=== 2CD track listing ===
Cover of the CD release

==== Disc 1 ====
1. "Deep Purple Overture" (Stephen Bentley-Klein, Jack Bruce, Pete Brown, Eric Clapton, Blackmore, Gillan, Glover, Lord, Paice)
2. "Highway Star"
3. "Hard Lovin' Man"
4. "Maybe I'm a Leo"
5. "Strange Kind of Woman"
6. "Rapture of the Deep" (Gillan, Steve Morse, Roger Glover, Don Airey, Paice)
7. "Woman from Tokyo"
8. "Contact Lost" (Morse)
9. Steve Morse solo (Morse)
10. "When a Blind Man Cries"
11. "The Well Dressed Guitar" (Morse)

==== Disc 2 ====
1. "Knocking at Your Back Door" (Blackmore, Gillan, Glover)
2. "Lazy"
3. "No One Came"
4. Don Airey solo
5. "Perfect Strangers" (Gillan, Blackmore, Glover)
6. "Space Truckin'"
7. "Smoke on the Water"
8. "Hush" (Joe South)
9. Roger Glover Solo
10. "Black Night"

== Personnel ==
Deep Purple

- Ian Gillan – vocals, harmonica
- Steve Morse – guitars
- Roger Glover – bass
- Ian Paice – drums
- Don Airey – keyboards

Orchestra

- Neue Philharmonie Frankfurt
- Stephen Bentley-Klein – conductor

== Production notes ==
- Audio engineer: David Richards
- Mixed and mastered by Eike Freese and Alexander Dietz

== Chart performance (DVD) ==
Year	Chart	Position
2014	Switzerland	3
