= Rod Evans =

English retired singer (born 1947)

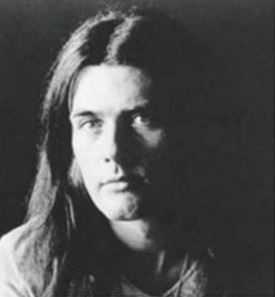
- Evans with Captain Beyond in 1973

Background information
- Born: Roderic Evans; 19 January 1947 (age 79); Great Britain
- Genres: Psychedelic rock; progressive rock; hard rock
- Occupation: Singer-songwriter (former)
- Years active: 1964–1973, 1980
- Formerly of: Deep Purple, Captain Beyond, The Maze, The Horizons, and Bogus Deep Purple

Roderic Evans (born 19 January 1947) is a retired British singer known as the original vocalist of the rock bands Deep Purple and Captain Beyond.

Evans began his professional career in The Maze before becoming a founding member of Deep Purple in 1968, with whom he recorded their first three studio albums. After recording a solo single, he co-founded Captain Beyond in 1971, with whom he recorded their first two studio albums. Following a brief legal battle with Deep Purple in 1980, Evans retired from music.

== Early career ==
Rod Evans was born on 19 January 1947; sources differ as to whether his birthplace was Edinburgh, Scotland or Slough, England. He "had been fronting groups since he was 17" and played together with drummer Ian Paice in The Maze, formerly MI5. He was also in a band called The Horizons in the mid-1960s.

== Deep Purple ==
Evans and Paice were original members of Deep Purple when they formed in Hertfordshire in 1968.

According to Deep Purple's founding bassist, Nick Simper, Evans was hired after "dozens" of other singers were auditioned. Evans clinched his place in the band after sharing an idea to rearrange the Beatles' song "Help!" as a ballad. This version of "Help!" was subsequently recorded for Deep Purple's debut album Shades of Deep Purple, but the most recognised song recorded with Evans is a cover of the Joe South composition "Hush", which reached No. 4 on the US Billboard charts in October 1968.

Deep Purple had one other US Top 40 hit with Evans on vocals, a cover of Neil Diamond's "Kentucky Woman", which appeared on the band's second album and peaked at No. 38. Both "Hush" and "Kentucky Woman" are used in the Quentin Tarantino film, Once Upon a Time in Hollywood.

After recording three studio albums and one non-album single ("Emmaretta"), Evans was dismissed in the summer of 1969 while on tour, with the last Deep Purple performance to feature Evans and Nick Simper taking place at the Top Rank in Cardiff, Wales on 4 July 1969. Evans was replaced by Ian Gillan. It had been decided by Ritchie Blackmore, Jon Lord and Ian Paice that Evans' pop vocal style would not be suitable for the heavier hard rock sound the band wanted to achieve moving forward. Another factor in Evans' dismissal from Deep Purple was his desire to move to the United States. In September 1969, he married Pamela McKee in Tennessee.

== Captain Beyond ==
In 1971, Evans recorded a solo single for Capitol, titled "Hard To Be Without You" (b/w "You Can't Love A Child Like A Woman"). That same year, he went on to form Captain Beyond, along with former Johnny Winter drummer Bobby Caldwell, former Iron Butterfly bassist Lee Dorman and guitarist Larry "Rhino" Reinhardt, who also was part of the last incarnation of Iron Butterfly.

Evans left Captain Beyond and the music business after two studio albums released in 1972 and 1973. He acquired a medical degree and became a director of respiratory therapy at a California hospital until 1980.

== Deep Purple controversy and lawsuit ==
In 1980, Evans was approached by a management company that specialized in the unscrupulous and frequently legally actionable practice of reforming groups with a minimum of original members, often in violation of trademark and contractual law. They offered him a chance to sing again under the Deep Purple name and he accepted. According to Nick Simper, the original Deep Purple bassist, Evans asked him to join the "new" Deep Purple, but Simper refused. Evans himself claimed in September 1980 that his former Deep Purple bandmates Jon Lord and Ian Paice had also been contacted to participate, but both were uninterested. This "bogus Deep Purple", comprising no former Deep Purple members apart from Evans, played a number of shows in Canada, Mexico and the US. The band performed renditions of songs from Evans' own tenure in the band, which Deep Purple biographer Dave Thompson described as "reasonable", while also playing selected songs from the Gillan and Coverdale/Hughes eras. These songs were described as "horrendous" and confirmed the "bogus Deep Purple's...complete lack of legitimate credentials". Several shows ended in what was described as "rioting", with chairs being thrown onto the stage at a gig in Toronto on August 12, 1980. The band had also talked of releasing an album of new material under the "Deep Purple" name, with 6 tracks being recorded in Los Angeles; this angered Jon Lord, who described such a possibility as "the worst lie".

A registered company, Deep Purple Overseas Ltd., had been registered with Companies House in the UK nine years prior in 1971 to safeguard the "Deep Purple" name from unwarranted exploitation. Members of the management team for the then-disbanded genuine Deep Purple, John Coletta and Tony Edwards, successfully sued and were awarded $672,000 in damages. As a result, Evans stopped receiving royalties from the Mark I Deep Purple albums and singles.

== Later life ==
Evans has not appeared publicly since the 1980 court case and his current whereabouts have been of considerable interest to fans of early Deep Purple online since at least the late 1990s.

In 2015, Ian Paice said, "If anyone knows where Rod is or even if he is still on the planet, that would be good news. We haven't had contact with him since the late 1970s. Nobody seems to know where the hell he is, or even if he is still alive. Not a clue."

In a 2015 interview, Captain Beyond drummer Bobby Caldwell mentioned that he was in touch with Evans, saying that Evans is "just doing fine these days" and had gone back to working in respiratory therapy for a long time. Caldwell similarly confirmed in September 2017 that Evans was "doing great", adding that Evans, who is married to another respiratory therapist, was residing in Northern California and had no plans to perform again.

Evans was inducted into the Rock and Roll Hall of Fame as a member of Deep Purple in 2016 but, despite being invited, he did not attend the ceremony.

== Discography ==
=== Solo ===
- "It's Hard to Be Without You" / "You Can't Love a Child Like a Woman" (1971), Single, Promo only

=== with Deep Purple ===
Studio Albums

- Shades of Deep Purple (1968), US#24
- The Book of Taliesyn (1968), US#54
- Deep Purple (1969), US#162

Live albums

- Inglewood – Live in California (2002)
- BBC Sessions 1968–1970 (2011)

Compilations

- Purple Passages (1972), US#57
- Mark I & II (1973)
- When We Rock, We Rock, and When We Roll, We Roll (1978)
- The Anthology (1985), UK#50
- The Deep Purple Singles A's and B's (1993)
- Smoke on the Water: The Best Of (1994)
- 30: Very Best of Deep Purple (1998), UK#39, UK: Silver
- Shades 1968–1998 (1999)
- The Very Best of Deep Purple (2000), UK: Gold
- Listen, Learn, Read On (2002)
- The Early Years (2004)
- The Platinum Collection (2005), UK#39
- Deepest Purple: The Very Best of Deep Purple 30th Anniversary Edition (2010)

Singles

- "Hush" (1968), US#4
- "Kentucky Woman" (1968), US#38
- "River Deep – Mountain High" (1969), US#53
- "Emmaretta" (1969), US#128

DVDs

- History, Hits & Highlights '68–'76 (2009)

=== with Captain Beyond ===
Studio albums

- Captain Beyond (1972), US#134
- Sufficiently Breathless (1973), US#90
- Lost & Found 1972-1973 (2017)

Live Albums

- Live In Texas October 6, 1973 (2013)
- Live Anthology Official Bootleg (2013)
