= Days May Come and Days May Go =

Days May Come and Days May Go: The 1975 California Rehearsals, Volume 1

Live album by Deep Purple
- Released: 14 March 2000
- Recorded: June 1975
- Genre: Hard rock
- Length: 65:25
- Label: Purple (UK and Europe); Victor (Japan)
- Producer: Deep Purple & Martin Birch

Deep Purple compilations chronology
The Very Best of Deep Purple (2000)	Days May Come and Days May Go: The 1975 California Rehearsals, Volume 1 (2000)	Smoke on the Water & Other Hits (2001)

Professional ratings
Review scores
Source	Rating
AllMusic	2/5 stars

Days May Come and Days May Go is an archival album by the English hard rock band Deep Purple, released in 2000 (see 2000 in music).

It contains rehearsals and lengthy improvised jams undertaken in June 1975, at Robert Simon's Pirate Sound studios. Recorded soon after Tommy Bolin had joined the band, the sound-desk recordings feature ideas and tracks that would eventually become the Come Taste the Band album. The recordings were first issued in 2000 as two separate releases, Days May Come and Days May Go: The California Rehearsals and the mail order-only 1420 Beachwood Drive: The California Rehearsals Pt. 2. In 2007, they were reissued together as a 2-CD set under the Days May Come and Days May Go: The California Rehearsals title.

== Days May Come and Days May Go: The California Rehearsals: June 1975 ==
=== Track listing ===
1. "Owed to G (Instrumental)" (Tommy Bolin) – 3:31
2. "If You Love Me Woman" (Bolin, David Coverdale) – 10:06
3. "The Orange Juice Song" (Coverdale, Jon Lord) – 3:33
4. "I Got Nothing for You" (Bolin, Coverdale, Glenn Hughes, Lord) – 12:52
5. "Statesboro Blues" (Blind Willie McTell) – 5:55
6. "Dance to the Rock & Roll" (Bolin, Coverdale, Hughes, Lord, Ian Paice) – 11:01
7. "Drifter (Rehearsal Sequence)" (Bolin, Coverdale) – 3:28
8. "Drifter (Version 1)" (Bolin, Coverdale) – 4:02
9. "The Last of the Long Jams" (Bolin, Coverdale, Hughes, Lord, Paice) – 9:04
10. "Untitled Song" (impromptu version of "I Got You Babe" by Sonny Bono) – 1:05

=== Personnel ===
- Tommy Bolin: Guitars, vocals.
- David Coverdale: Vocals.
- Glenn Hughes: Bass guitar, vocals.
- Jon Lord: Keyboards, organ, mini moog, vocals.
- Ian Paice: Drums, percussion.

=== Production ===
- Martin Birch: Producer.
- Robert Simon: Engineer.
- Nick Watson: Sound Replacements.
- Simon Robinson: Coordination, Liner Notes.

== 1420 Beachwood Drive: The California Rehearsals Pt. 2: June 1975 ==
=== Track listing ===
1. "Drifter (Version 2)" (Bolin, Coverdale) – 3:41
2. "Sail Away Riff" (Blackmore, Coverdale) – 2:50
3. "You Keep on Moving (take 1)" (Coverdale, Hughes) – 8:18
4. "Pirate Blues (jam)" (Bolin, Coverdale, Hughes, Lord, Paice) – 6:45
5. "Say You Love Me" (Coverdale) – 7:25

=== Personnel ===
- David Coverdale: Vocals
- Tommy Bolin: Guitars, vocals
- Jon Lord: Keyboards, organ
- Ian Paice: Drums, percussion
- Glenn Hughes: Bass guitar, vocals
