= Perks and Tit =

Live album by Deep Purple
- Released: 29 March 2004
- Recorded: 9 April 1974, San Diego Sports Arena
- Genre: Hard rock, heavy metal
- Length: 50:00

Deep Purple live albums chronology
| Space Vol 1 & 2 (2004) | Perks and Tit (2004) | Live in Europe 1993 (2006) |

Perks & Tit is a live album released by Deep Purple, recorded at the San Diego Sports Arena on 9 April 1974 during the band's U.S. tour in support of Burn. It was released in 2004 in celebration of its 30th anniversary. The album was made officially available (via mail order) by Purple Records and the Deep Purple Appreciation Society (DPAS) for a limited time through its Sonic Zoom imprint, although many bootlegs of the show had circulated for years.

This album was recorded at the final show of a highly successful American tour, the first to feature new members David Coverdale (lead vocals) and Glenn Hughes (bass, vocals) replacing Ian Gillan and Roger Glover respectively, and just three days after Deep Purple's performance at the California Jam. This was the third US concert tour for guitarist Ritchie Blackmore, keyboardist Jon Lord and drummer Ian Paice.

It was not intended to "officially" record this show (confirmed by a comment from Hughes himself during the performance), but a soundboard recording was made and is the source of this release. The recording is incomplete, missing both "You Fool No One" and encore number "Space Truckin". The final running time of the recording is thus roughly 50 minutes, whereas the actual show was about 80 minutes long.

This recording was re-released by Purple Records via Sonic Zoom on 3 September 2007, now simply titled Live in San Diego 1974. While it has been fully restored and cleaned up from the original tape sources (restoring some between song patter previously edited), it still features the same, incomplete track list as the original release.

== Track listing ==
All songs written by David Coverdale, Ritchie Blackmore, Jon Lord and Ian Paice except where noted.

1. "Burn"
2. "Might Just Take Your Life"
3. "Lay Down, Stay Down"
4. "Mistreated" (Coverdale, Blackmore)
5. "Smoke on the Water" (Ian Gillan, Blackmore, Roger Glover, Lord, Paice)
6. "Keyboard Solo" (Lord)

== Personnel ==
- David Coverdale – lead vocals
- Ritchie Blackmore – guitars
- Glenn Hughes – bass, backing vocals
- Ian Paice – drums, percussion
- Jon Lord – keyboards, backing vocals
