= Woman from Tokyo =

Single by Deep Purple

from the album Who Do We Think We Are
- B-side: "Black Night" (live) (Europe); "Super Trouper" (US/Japan)
- Released: February 1973
- Recorded: July 1972
- Genre: Hard rock; blues rock
- Length: 5:48
- Label: Purple
- Songwriters: Ritchie Blackmore; Ian Gillan; Roger Glover; Jon Lord; Ian Paice
- Producer: Deep Purple

Deep Purple singles chronology
"Smoke on the Water" (1973)	"Woman from Tokyo" (1973)	"Super Trouper" (1973)

"Woman from Tokyo" is a song by English rock band Deep Purple. It was first released on their 1973 album Who Do We Think We Are, and later as a single in various territories. A UK-release was planned for February 1973, but was cancelled.

The song was featured on the 2011 DVD Deep Purple with Orchestra – Live in Montreux where Deep Purple Mark VIII (Gillan, Paice, Glover, Morse, Airey) with a full symphony orchestra conducted by Stephen Bentley-Klein.

== Background ==
Deep Purple was one of the first rock bands to perform in Japan in the early 1970s. As a tribute, the band wrote the song "Woman from Tokyo." It was one of the final songs to feature singer Ian Gillan, who departed in 1973 to pursue a solo career. The song features Japanese imagery such as "the rising sun" and "an Eastern dream," and its lyrics are about a Japanese woman whose charms fascinate the narrator. "Woman from Tokyo" grew to be one of the band's most popular songs and received heavy radio airplay. Despite this, the band did not include the song into their live set at the time, and only began playing the song when they reformed in 1984.

The admiration of Deep Purple for progressive rock is reflected in the long dreamy break that occupies the middle of the track. This break appears only on the album version and is missing from the single, which explains the sharp difference in duration between the versions.

== Reception ==
Cash Box called the song "that super driving rocker that everyone will jump on immediately." Cash Box also described it as a "super charged rocker performed with great energy by the kings of electric rock." Record World called it a "cooker" and a "rock 'em sock 'em item."

"Woman from Tokyo" was ranked at number 3 on Ultimate Classic Rock's list of Top 10 Roger Glover songs.

Eduardo Rivadavia of AllMusic said that "Woman from Tokyo" along with "Rat Bat Blue" were the only songs from Who Do We Think We Are that were good. It stated that the song "hinted at glories past with its signature Ritchie Blackmore riff." On the other hand, Alex Henderson of AllMusic writes of the excellence of Machine Head and Who Do We Think We Are when describing Stormbringer.

== Chart performance ==
"Woman from Tokyo" was a hit, as it reached No. 6 on the Dutch MegaCharts. The song peaked at 16 in Germany and 23 in Belgium. It was a modest success in the U.S., reaching No. 60 on the chart there. In Canada, the song reached No. 62 on May 12, and made a re-appearance in October, reaching No. 55 on May 27, 1973.

== Release history ==
Region	Date	Ref.
Germany	February 1973	
Japan	March 1973	
Netherlands	March 1973	
United States	April 1973	
Australia	31 May 1973	

== Charts ==
Weekly chart performance for "Woman from Tokyo"
Chart (1973)	Peak position
Australia (Kent Music Report)	92
Belgium (Ultratop 50 Flanders)	23
Belgium (Ultratop 50 Wallonia)	32
Canada (RPM)	55
Italy (Musica e dischi)	46
Netherlands (Single Top 100)	6
US Billboard Hot 100	60
West Germany (Official German Charts)	16
