= Made in Japan (Deep Purple album) =

Live album by Deep Purple
- Released: 8 December 1972 (Note: Released as "Live in Japan")
- Recorded: 15–17 August 1972
- Venues: Festival Hall, Osaka; Nippon Budokan, Tokyo
- Genres: Hard rock; heavy metal
- Length: 76:44
- Labels: Purple; Warner Bros. (US & Canada)
- Producer: Deep Purple

Deep Purple chronology
Machine Head (1972)	Made in Japan (1972)	Who Do We Think We Are (1973)

Deep Purple live albums chronology
Concerto for Group and Orchestra (1969)	Made in Japan (1972)	Made in Europe (1976)

Made in Japan is a double live album by English rock band Deep Purple, recorded during their first tour of Japan in August 1972. It was originally released on 8 December 1972 in Japan, 22 December 1972 in the United Kingdom, with a US release on 30 March 1973, and became a critical and commercial success.

The band were well known for their strong stage act, and had privately recorded several shows, or broadcast them on radio, but were unenthusiastic about recording a live album until their Japanese record company decided it would be good for publicity. They insisted on supervising the live production, including using Martin Birch, who had previously collaborated with the band as a studio engineer, and were not particularly interested in the album's release, even after recording. The tour was successful, with strong media interest and a positive response from fans.

The album was an immediate commercial success, particularly in the US, where it was accompanied by the top five hit "Smoke on the Water", and became a steady seller throughout the 1970s. A three-CD set of most of the tour's performances was released in 1993, while a remastered edition of the album with a CD of extra tracks was released in 1998. In 2014, a deluxe edition was announced with further bonus material. The album received a strong critical reception and continues to attract praise. A Rolling Stone readers' poll in 2012 ranked Made in Japan the sixth best live album of all time.

== Background and live bootlegs ==
Deep Purple "Mk II" formed in July 1969 when founding members, guitarist Ritchie Blackmore, organist Jon Lord and drummer Ian Paice, recruited singer Ian Gillan and bassist Roger Glover to progress from their earlier pop and psychedelic rock sound towards hard rock. They began touring extensively, becoming a well received live band, and had recorded several shows either to broadcast on the radio or listen to privately. However, they had rejected the idea of releasing a live album commercially as they believed it would be impossible to reproduce the quality and experience of their stage act on an LP.

Consequently, there was a demand for bootleg recordings of the band. The most notorious of these was an LP entitled H Bomb, recorded at Aachen on 11 July 1970, which led to a subsequent court case when Virgin Records' Richard Branson was prosecuted for selling it. An article in Melody Maker that examined the bootleg phenomenon claimed that H Bomb was the best selling one at that time. This success, along with albums from other artists such as the Who's Live at Leeds and the Rolling Stones' Get Yer Ya-Ya's Out convinced the band that an official live album would be commercially successful. At the time, Glover told Sounds magazine that "there are so many bootlegs of us going around, if we put out our own live set, it should kill their market."

== Tour and recording ==
By 1972, Deep Purple had achieved considerable commercial success in Japan, including several hit singles, so it made sense to tour there. Three dates were booked; the Festival Hall, Osaka on 11 and 12 May, and the Budokan, Tokyo on 16 May, though these were later changed to 15 and 16 August, and 17 August respectively due to an earlier US tour being rescheduled. The dates sold out almost immediately, and consequently the Japanese arm of the band's label, Warner Bros. Records, wanted to record the tour for a live album to be released in the country. The band eventually agreed to the idea, but insisted if it was going to be released, they wanted it to be done properly. Gillan recalled, "we said we would have to OK the equipment, we wanted to use our own engineer and we would have the last say on whether the tapes were released". The band enlisted producer Martin Birch, who had worked on previous studio albums, to record the shows onto an 8-track recorder so they could subsequently be mixed.

The band's live setlist had been revamped at the start of the year, immediately after recording the album Machine Head, and that album made up a substantial proportion of new material. Although the setlist remained the same for most of the year, opening with "Highway Star" and closing with "Lazy" and "Space Truckin'", the band's musical skill and structure meant there was sufficient improvisation within the songs to keep things fresh. The original intention was the stage act would be used for about a year before being dropped, but Gillan and Glover both resigned from the band in June 1973. When this line-up reformed in 1984, the 1972 setlist made up a significant amount of material performed in concert.

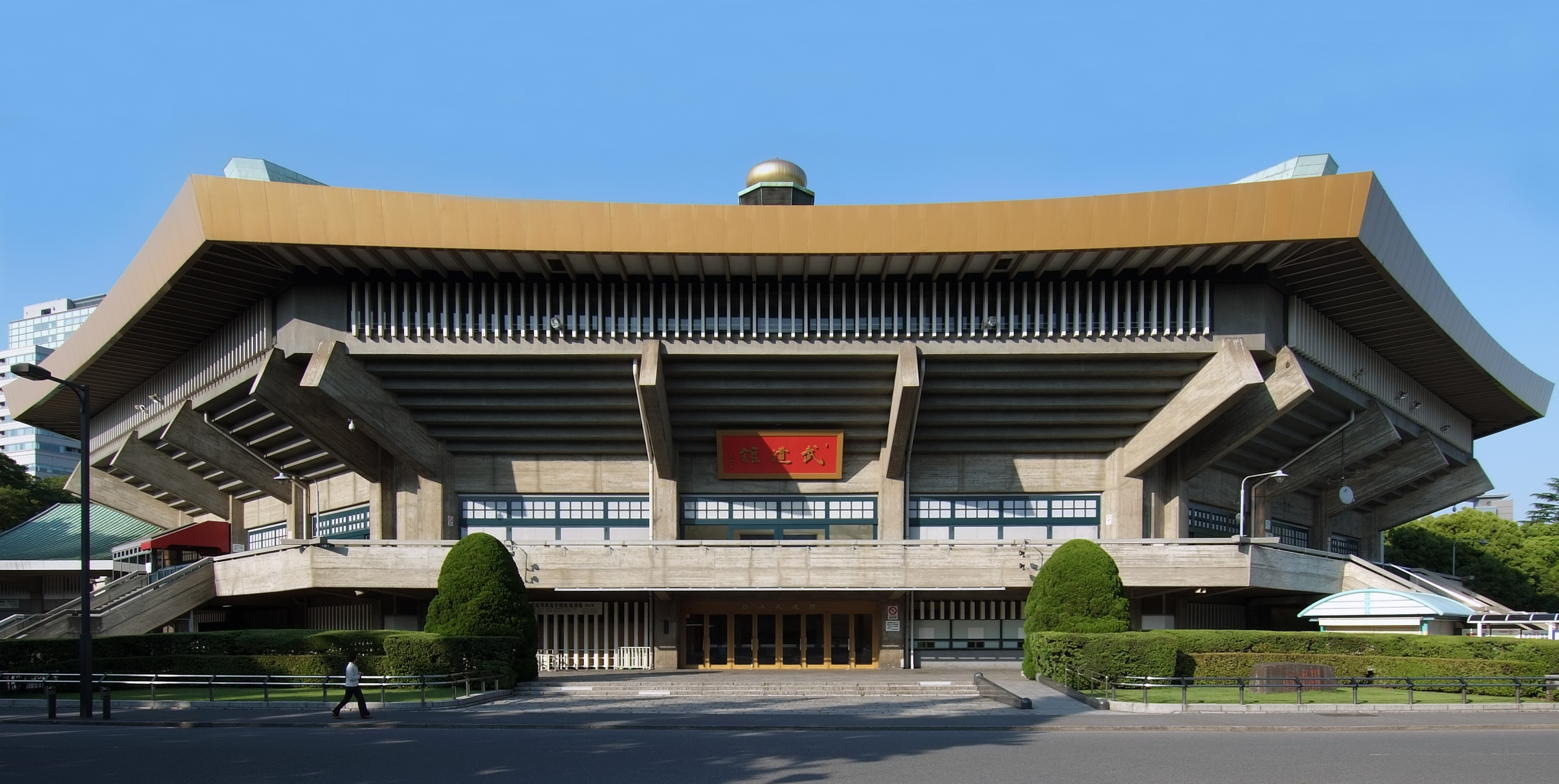
The band's favourite gig of the tour was at the Nippon Budokan on 17 August 1972

The band arrived in Japan on 9 August, a week before the tour started, to a warm reception, and were greeted with gifts and flowers. Birch was not confident that the recording quality would be satisfactory, since the equipment supplied by Warner Bros. did not have any balance control and that the recorder's size did not appear big enough on sight to capture a commercial quality recording. The band were uninterested in the result, concentrating on simply being able to deliver a good show. Subsequently, Lord noted that he felt this attitude meant the spontaneity of the performances and interplay between the band members was captured well.

The second gig in Osaka was considered to be the stronger of the two, and indeed this show made up the bulk of the released LP. Only one song, "Smoke on the Water" from 15 August show was used, and this may simply have been because it was the only gig that Blackmore played the song's opening riff as per the studio album.

The band considered the gig at Tokyo on 17 August to be the best of the tour. Glover remembered "twelve or thirteen thousand Japanese kids were singing along to 'Child in Time'" and considered it a career highlight, as did Gillan. At the venue, a row of bodyguards manned the front of the stage. When Blackmore smashed his guitar during the end of "Space Truckin'" and threw it into the audience, several of them clambered past fans to try and retrieve it. Blackmore was annoyed, but the rest of the band found the incident amusing. The gig was not as well recorded as the Osaka shows, although "The Mule" and "Lazy" were considered of sufficient quality to make the final release.

There were no overdubs on the album. Lord claimed once in a magazine interview that a line from "Strange Kind of Woman" had to be redubbed from a different show after Gillan had tripped over his microphone cable, but no direct evidence of this was found when the multitrack tapes were examined. According to Lord, the total budget for the recording was only $3,000 (equivalent to £35,531 in 2025 or equivalent to $23,091 in 2025).

== Release ==
"That double album ... wasn't meant to be released outside of Japan. They wound up putting it out anyway and it went platinum in about two weeks."

— Jon Lord

The band did not consider the album to be important and only Glover and Paice showed up to mix it. According to Birch, Gillan and Blackmore have never heard the finished album. The band did not want the album to be released outside Japan and wanted full rights to the tapes, but it was released worldwide anyway.

The album was released in the UK in December 1972, with a special offer price of £3.25, the same as a typical single LP from that period. It reached number 16 in the charts. The cover was designed by Glover and featured a colour photo of the band on the front and rear covers, and black and white photos in the inside gatefold. The release in the US was delayed until 30 March 1973, because Warner Bros. wanted to release Who Do We Think We Are first. They were motivated into releasing it due to a steady flow of UK imports being purchased, and it was an immediate commercial success, reaching number 6 in the charts. Warner Brothers also released "Smoke on the Water" as a single, coupling the live recording on Made in Japan with the studio version on Machine Head, and it reached number 4 in the Billboard charts. A recording of "Black Night" from the Tokyo gig, one of the encores that was not on the album, was released as the B-side to the single "Woman from Tokyo" in Europe, and as a single in its own right in Japan.

The Japanese release was titled Live in Japan and featured a unique sleeve design, with an overhead stage shot of the band, a selection of photographs from a gig at the Rainbow Theatre in London, and an insert with lyrics and a hand-written message from each band member. The first pressing came with a 35mm film negative with photos of the band, from which buyers could make their own prints. The sleeve notes claimed that the recording only contained the Tokyo gig, though in fact it was musically identical to the version released in the rest of the world. Future Def Leppard guitarist Phil Collen was in the audience for the Rainbow gig as captured on the sleeve.

In Uruguay, the album was released in 1974 as a single LP (with just the first two sides) on Odeon Records. It used a simplistic sleeve design unlike any other release, with a rising sun on the cover.

== Reception ==
Professional ratings
Review scores
Source	Rating
AllMusic	4.5/5 stars
Uncut	5/5 stars

The band had mixed feelings about the album. Gillan was critical of his own performance, yet impressed with the quality of the recording, while Lord listed it as his favourite Deep Purple album, saying, "The band was at the height of its powers. That album was the epitome of what we stood for in those days." "It's still probably the best live rock 'n' roll album ever made," declared Paice, who suggested that the shows were some of the group's best. "And that's putting everything Led Zeppelin have done, anything Black Sabbath may have done, Bad Company, Free... As a tour de force of innovation and living on the edge and great playing with a fantastic sound, nothing comes close."

The response from critics was favourable. Rolling Stone's Jon Tiven wrote that "Made in Japan is Purple's definitive metal monster, a spark-filled execution ... Deep Purple can still cut the mustard in concert". Subsequently, a 2012 readers' poll in the magazine declared the album to be the sixth best live album of all time, adding the band have performed "countless shows since in countless permutations, but they've never sounded quite this perfect."

Recent reviews have been equally positive. AllMusic's William Ruhlmann considered the album to be "a definitive treatment of the band's catalog and its most impressive album". Rock author Daniel Bukszpan claimed the album is "widely acknowledged as one of the greatest live albums of all time". Goldmine magazine said the album "defined Deep Purple even as it redefined the concept of the live album." Deep Purple author Dave Thompson wrote "the standing of Deep Purple's first (and finest) live album had scarcely diminished in the quarter-century since its release".

Iron Maiden vocalist Bruce Dickinson spoke positively about the album, "It changed my life, it blew me away. I wanted to be everybody in that band, everybody. I blew up the speakers on my parent's stereogram playing that record, I knew every note on it. I actually used to jump around on sofas with a shitty guitar, trying to be Ritchie Blackmore and doing what I imagined he did on stage."

Metallica drummer Lars Ulrich praised the album as being "in my humble opinion, hands down the best hard rock live album ever", citing its intensity and the creativity behind different takes of the band's classics, "I have heard it just about 18,000 times, and every time I hear it, it just gets better and better and better, and it's so crazy cool."

== Reissues ==
The original LP was a steady seller throughout the 1970s and remained in print. The first reissue on CD was in 1988 which contained the complete double-LP on a single CD.

The 8-track tapes of the three shows were carefully put in storage by Warner Bros. Japan for future use. For the album's 21st anniversary in 1993, Deep Purple author and archivist Simon Robinson decided to enquire via the band's management if the tapes could be located. He discovered the entire show had been recorded well, including all the encores. In July, Robinson and Darron Goodwin remixed the tapes at Abbey Road Studios for an expanded edition, that was then mastered by Peter Mew in September. To compromise between including as much of the shows as possible and setting a realistic price that most fans would accept, they decided to release a 3-CD box set, titled Live in Japan. This included all of the three main shows except for two tracks already available on the original album. In their place were two previously unreleased encores.

Robinson subsequently oversaw a new reissue of the original album in 1998 on CD, that was also remastered by Mew. This version contained an extra CD with three tracks that had been left off the 1993 set. The colour scheme of the cover was reversed to show gold text on a black background. The remastered Made in Japan has further edits to make a contiguous performance, making it shorter than the original release. At the same time, a limited edition of 4,000 double LPs was released on purple vinyl, while in Spain, EMI added the studio versions of the tracks making up the original album to the second CD.

In 2014, Universal Music announced that the album would be reissued in a number of formats in May. The deluxe option is a set of four CDs or 9 LPs containing a new remix of the three concerts in full, a DVD containing previously unseen video footage, a hardback book and other memorabilia. The original LP was reissued in 180g vinyl as per the original release with the original 1972 mix, with the audio available for digital download through popular providers.

On 15 August 2025, Rhino reissued the full series of recorded shows with the main album remixed by Steven Wilson along with a Blu-ray featuring an Atmos, 5.1 and stereo remix of the original album. The three additional shows were remixed by Richard Digby-Smith with a fourth disc featuring single edits and encores. The set was mastered by Andy Pearce and Matt Wortham. Additionally, the set includes a booklet, a replica of the Japanese program plus a replica of the poster included with the original album. It was also issued in a 10-LP set by Rhino.

== Cover version ==
On 13 January 2006, progressive metal band Dream Theater played the original album in its entirety at Kokusai Forum in Tokyo, and also on the 15th at NHK Hall in Osaka. Both performances were recorded, and mixed by Glover. The latter of the two shows has been released through the band's YtseJam Records label.

== Track listing ==
All tracks are written by Ritchie Blackmore, Ian Gillan, Roger Glover, Jon Lord and Ian Paice except where indicated.

Side one
No.	Title	Recording date and location	Length
1.	"Highway Star"	Osaka on 16 August	6:52 (Note: The original LP does not list track times. These are taken from the 1988 CD reissue, which is a straight transcription.)
2.	"Child in Time"	Osaka on 16 August	12:25

Side two
No.	Title	...	Length
3.	"Smoke on the Water"	Osaka on 15 August	7:32
4.	"The Mule"	Tokyo on 17 August	9:50

Side three
No.	Title	...	Length
5.	"Strange Kind of Woman"	Osaka on 16 August	9:36
6.	"Lazy"	Tokyo on 17 August	10:51

Side four
No.	Title	...	Length
7.	"Space Truckin'"	Osaka on 16 August	19:42

1988 CD Release
No.	Title	Recording date and location	Length
1.	"Highway Star"	Osaka on 16 August	6:45
2.	"Child in Time"	Osaka on 16 August	12:19
3.	"Smoke on the Water"	Osaka on 15 August	7:27
4.	"The Mule"	Tokyo on 17 August	9:45
5.	"Strange Kind of Woman"	Osaka on 16 August	9:26
6.	"Lazy"	Tokyo on 17 August	10:59
7.	"Space Truckin'"	Osaka on 16 August	20:02

=== Live in Japan 3CD set ===
1993 Remix by Darron Godwin, assisted by Simon Robinson. Remaster by Peter Mew.
Titles already released on Made in Japan are in bold.

Disc one - Good Morning
No.	Title	Length
1.	"Highway Star"	7:37
2.	"Child in Time"	11:51
3.	"The Mule"	9:36
4.	"Strange Kind of Woman"	8:50
5.	"Lazy"	10:26
6.	"Space Truckin'"	21:35
7.	"Black Night" (Encore)	6:25
Total length:		76:22

- Recorded in Osaka on 15 August 1972
- "**Smoke on the Water**" from the 15th is not included here but is available on the original album
- The encore "Speed King" from the 15th is not included here on CD1 but is available on CD3

Disc two - Next week, we're turning professional
No.	Title	Length
1.	"**Highway Star**"	7:07
2.	"Smoke on the Water"	7:25
3.	"**Child in Time**"	12:30
4.	"The Mule"	10:22
5.	"**Strange Kind of Woman**"	10:35
6.	"Lazy"	10:21
7.	"**Space Truckin'**"	20:13
Total length:		78:35

- Recorded in Osaka on 16 August 1972
- The two encores "Black Night" and "Lucille" from the 16th are not included here but "Black Night" has been released on compilations and "Lucille" is available on the 1998 reissue of Made in Japan on CD 2.

Disc three - Can we have everything louder than everything else?
No.	Title	Length
1.	"Highway Star"	7:14
2.	"Smoke on the Water"	7:06
3.	"Child in Time"	11:32
4.	"Strange Kind of Woman"	11:26
5.	"**Lazy**"	11:16
6.	"Space Truckin'"	19:19
7.	"Speed King" (Encore – recorded in Osaka on 15 August 1972)	7:55
Total length:		75:52

- Recorded in Tokyo on 17 August 1972
- "**The Mule**" from the 17th is not included here but is available on the main album
- The two encores "Black Night" and "Speed King" from the 17th are not included here but are available on the 1998 reissue disc 2
- "Speed King" on CD3 is from the 15th

=== 25th Anniversary remastered edition (2CD) ===
Disc one - Made in Japan
No.	Title	Length
1.	"Highway Star"	6:43
2.	"Child in Time"	12:17
3.	"Smoke on the Water"	7:36
4.	"The Mule"	9:28
5.	"Strange Kind of Woman"	9:52
6.	"Lazy"	10:27
7.	"Space Truckin'"	19:54

Disc two - The Encores
No.	Title	Recording date and location	Length
1.	"Black Night" (An edited version that had previously appeared on single B-sides)	Tokyo on 17 August	6:18
2.	"Speed King" (Previously unreleased)	Tokyo on 17 August	7:24
3.	"Lucille" (Albert Collins, Richard Penniman; Previously unreleased)	Osaka on 16 August	8:03

=== 2014 Box Set Edition ===
Disc one - "Good Morning" Osaka 15 August 1972
No.	Title	Length
1.	"Highway Star"	7:12
2.	"Smoke On The Water"	7:37
3.	"Child In Time"	11:38
4.	"The Mule"	10:11
5.	"Strange Kind of Woman"	8:27
6.	"Lazy"	10:01
7.	"Space Truckin'"	22:27

Disc two - "Next Week We're Turning Professional" Osaka 16 August 1972
No.	Title	Length
1.	"Highway Star"	7:28
2.	"Smoke On The Water"	7:28
3.	"Child In Time"	13:14
4.	"The Mule"	10:48
5.	"Strange Kind of Woman"	9:38
6.	"Lazy"	10:11
7.	"Space Truckin'"	20:08

Disc three - "Can We Have Everything Louder Than Everything Else?" Tokyo 17 August 1972
No.	Title	Length
1.	"Highway Star"	8:01
2.	"Smoke On The Water"	7:20
3.	"Child In Time"	11:29
4.	"The Mule"	10:25
5.	"Strange Kind of Woman"	11:03
6.	"Lazy"	10:59
7.	"Space Truckin'"	19:38

Disc four - "Good Night" Encores
No.	Title	Length
1.	"Black Night (15 August)"	6:58
2.	"Speed King (15 August)"	8:28
3.	"Black Night (16 August)"	6:58
4.	"Lucille (16 August)"	9:03
5.	"Black Night (17 August)"	8:01
6.	"Speed King (17 August)"	7:19

Disc five - Made in Japan Documentary DVD
No.	Title	Length

Disc six - Japanese 7" Promo
No.	Title	Length
1.	"Smoke on the Water (Live, Edit)"	4:34
2.	"Smoke on the Water (Studio, Edit)"	3:48

=== 2014 2CD Edition ===
Disc one - 2013 Kevin Shirley Remix
No.	Title	Length
1.	"Highway Star"	6:41
2.	"Child in Time"	12:33
3.	"Smoke on the Water"	7:18
4.	"The Mule"	9:28
5.	"Strange Kind of Woman"	9:52
6.	"Lazy"	10:24
7.	"Space Truckin'"	19:49

Disc two - The Encores: 2014 Martin Pullan Remix
No.	Title	Length
1.	"Black Night (15 August)"	6:58
2.	"Speed King (15 August)"	8:28
3.	"Black Night (16 August)"	6:58
4.	"Lucille (16 August)"	9:03
5.	"Black Night (17 August)"	8:01
6.	"Speed King (17 August)"	7:19

== Personnel ==
Taken from the sleeve notes:

Deep Purple

- Ian Gillan – vocals, harmonica, percussion
- Ritchie Blackmore – guitars
- Roger Glover – bass guitar
- Jon Lord – organ, piano
- Ian Paice – drums

Recording unit

- Co-ordination – Warner Pioneer
- Engineering – Martin Birch
- Equipment – Ian Hansford, Rob Cooksey, Colin Hart, Ron Quinton
- Marshall Engineer – K Flegg
- Promoters – Universal Orient Promotions
- Produced by Deep Purple
- Mixed by Roger Glover, Ian Paice
- Cover Design – Roger Glover
- Photography – Fin Costello
- Remastered by Peter Mew (1998)

== Charts ==
=== Weekly charts ===
Chart (1972–1973)	Peak position
Austrian Albums (Ö3 Austria)	1
Canada Top Albums/CDs (RPM)	5
Danish Albums Chart	8
Dutch Albums (Album Top 100)	4
Finland (The Official Finnish Charts)	4
French Albums (SNEP)	3
German Albums (Offizielle Top 100)	1
Italian Albums (Musica e Dischi)	7
Japanese Albums (Oricon)	14
Norwegian Albums (VG-lista)	7
Spanish Albums (AFYVE)	10
UK Albums (Official Charts)	16
US Billboard 200	6

Chart (2014–2025)	Peak position
Belgian Albums (Ultratop Flanders)	60
Belgian Albums (Ultratop Wallonia)	27
German Albums (Offizielle Top 100)	5
German Rock & Metal Albums (Offizielle Top 100)	2
Hungarian Physical Albums (MAHASZ)	26
Japanese Rock Albums (Oricon)	11
Swiss Albums (Schweizer Hitparade)	5

=== Year-end charts ===
Chart (1973)	Position
German Albums (Offizielle Top 100)	2

== Certifications and sales ==
Region	Certification	Certified units/sales
Austria (IFPI Austria)	Platinum	50,000^{*}
France (SNEP)	Gold	100,000^{*}
Germany (BVMI)	Platinum	500,000^{^}
Italy (FIMI) 25th Anniversary edition	Platinum	100,000^{*}
Spain (Promusicae)	Platinum	100,000^{^}
Sweden	—	25,000
United Kingdom (BPI)	Gold	100,000^{^}
United States (RIAA)	Platinum	1,000,000^{^}
^{*} Sales figures based on certification alone.^{^} Shipments figures based on certification alone.

== Accolades ==
Publication	Country	Accolade	Year	Rank
Kerrang!	United Kingdom	"100 Greatest Heavy Metal Albums of All Time"	1989	75
New Musical Express	United Kingdom	"50 Best Live Albums"	2011	13
Rolling Stone reader's poll	U.S.	"10 Best Live Albums"	2012	6
Classic Rock	U.S.	"The 50 Greatest Live Albums Ever"	2020	1
