= Strange Kind of Woman =

- Cover of the 1971 Swedish single

Single by Deep Purple
- B-side: "I'm Alone"
- Released: 12 February 1971
- Recorded: January 1971
- Genre: Hard rock; blues rock
- Length: 3:49 (single version); 4:04 (US album version)
- Label: Harvest Records (UK); Warner Bros. Records (US)
- Songwriters: Ian Gillan, Ritchie Blackmore, Roger Glover, Jon Lord, Ian Paice
- Producer: Deep Purple

Deep Purple singles chronology
"Black Night" (1970)	"Strange Kind of Woman" (1971)	"Fireball" (1971)

"Strange Kind of Woman" is a song by English rock band Deep Purple that was originally released as a follow-up single to "Black Night" in early 1971. The song also became a hit, peaking at No. 8 on the UK chart and Germany, and No. 1 in Denmark. The 1996 remix by Roger Glover later appeared on the re-release of the band's 1971 album Fireball, while the original version can be found on various Deep Purple compilations. Although not part of the Fireball recording sessions, "Strange Kind of Woman" was included on the US and Canadian editions of the album, in lieu of the track "Demon's Eye" on the UK edition.

The B-side song, "I'm Alone", was later released on The Deep Purple Singles A's and B's as well as on the 25th anniversary reissue of Fireball.

== History ==
The song was originally called "Prostitute". Vocalist Ian Gillan introduced the song on Deep Purple in Concert: "It was about a friend of ours who got mixed up with a very evil woman and it was a sad story. They got married in the end. And a few days after they got married, the lady died." In Wordography's section Gillan gives a slightly different version of the song's history:

I loved her in a strange post-adolescent-pre-adult way, but then so did quite a lot of other people. She loved them too and gave them good return for their money. I failed miserably when I tried to break her from the habit… she said it wasn't a habit, it was her life and what did I know anyway? I did get promoted from Wednesday morning trysts to Saturday evening dates (sort of). The fact is, this song is not about one woman… but a compilation of thrills and disappointments, and such a package can only be called Nancy. I grew up fast… the innocence died and, in the category… My Woman… all claims were relinquished.

When Deep Purple performed the song live, Gillan and guitarist Ritchie Blackmore would engage in a call and response guitar-vocal duel in the middle. This would always end with an extremely long, high-pitched scream from Gillan before the band returned to playing the original song. An example can be heard on the live album, Made in Japan, recorded in 1972.

== Charts ==
Chart (1971)	Peak position
Australia (Go-Set)	34
Australia (Kent Music Report)	44
Austria (Ö3 Austria Top 40)	14
Belgium (Ultratop 50 Wallonia)	27
Denmark (IFPI)	1
Ireland (IRMA)	16
UK Singles (OCC)	8
West Germany (Official German Charts)	8

== Personnel ==
- Ian Gillan – vocals
- Ritchie Blackmore – guitars
- Roger Glover – bass
- Jon Lord – keyboards
- Ian Paice – drums
