= Who Do We Think We Are =

Studio album by Deep Purple
- Released: 12 January 1973 (US)
- Recorded: July 1972 in Rome, Italy and October 1972 in Frankfurt, West Germany, with the Rolling Stones Mobile Studio
- Genres: Hard rock; blues rock
- Length: 34:20
- Labels: Purple; Warner Bros. (US & Canada)
- Producer: Deep Purple

Deep Purple chronology
Made in Japan (1972)	Who Do We Think We Are (1973)	Burn (1974)

Singles from Who Do We Think We Are
- 1. "Woman from Tokyo" Released: February 1973; 2. "Super Trouper" Released: November 1973 (EU)

Who Do We Think We Are is the seventh studio album by the English rock band Deep Purple, released on 12 January 1973 in the US and in February 1973 in the UK. It was Deep Purple's last album by the Mark II line-up with singer Ian Gillan and bassist Roger Glover until 1984's Perfect Strangers.

Musically, the record showed a move to a more blues-based sound, even featuring scat singing. Although its production and the band's behaviour after its release showed the group in turmoil, with frontman Gillan remarking that "we'd all had major illnesses" and felt considerable fatigue, the album was a commercial success. Deep Purple became the top-selling U.S. artist in 1973. The album featured the energetic hard-rock single "Woman from Tokyo," which while scarcely played in concert during the 1970s, would become a live staple from the band's 1984 reunion onward.

== Recording ==
Who Do We Think We Are was recorded in Rome in July 1972 and Walldorf near Frankfurt in October 1972, using the Rolling Stones Mobile Studio.

"Woman from Tokyo," the first track recorded in July, is about touring Japan for the first time (e.g. the lyric "Fly into the Rising Sun"). The only other track released from the Rome sessions is the outtake "Painted Horse." The rest were recorded in Frankfurt after more touring (including Japan, which yielded Made in Japan). The group, riven with internal strife, struggled to come up with tracks they agreed upon. Glover, in particular, stated that the band was refusing to consider his song ideas. Members were not speaking to each other and many songs were finished only after schedules were arranged so they could record parts separately.

Of "Mary Long," Gillan said: "Mary Whitehouse and Lord Longford were particularly high-profile figures at the time, with very waggy-waggy finger attitudes… It was about the standards of the older generation, the whole moral framework, intellectual vandalism – all of the things that exist throughout the generations… Mary Whitehouse and Lord Longford became one person, fusing together to represent the hypocrisy that I saw at the time."

Ian Gillan left the band following this album, citing internal tensions – widely thought to include a feud with guitarist Ritchie Blackmore. However, in an interview supporting the Mark II Purple comeback album Perfect Strangers, Gillan stated that fatigue and management had a lot to do with it:

We had just come off 18 months of touring, and we'd all had major illnesses at one time or another. Looking back, if they'd have been decent managers, they would have said, 'All right, stop. I want you to all go on three months' holiday. I don't even want you to pick up an instrument.' But instead they pushed us to complete the album on time. We should have stopped. I think if we did, Deep Purple would have still been around to this day.

Added Jerry Bloom, editor of the book More Black than Purple:

At this point, Deep Purple had become hugely successful. Success breeds demand, demand breeds more work, more work means you’re spending more time together. Generally, when you spend more time together, you get on each other’s nerves.

The last Mark II concert in the 1970s before Gillan and Glover left was in Osaka, Japan on 29 June 1973. No songs from Who Do We Think We Are were performed at this concert despite it being the band's newest album at the time. "Mary Long" had been played at some other dates on the same tour as the sole song from the album performed.

== Album title and artwork ==
The original album artwork has many quoted articles from newspapers. One of them is from magazine Melody Maker of July 1972, where drummer Ian Paice remarks:

Deep Purple get piles of passionate letters either violently against or pro the group. The angry ones generally start off "Who do Deep Purple think they are..."

Another clipping simply has the Paice quote "I bought it so i'll bloody well boot it", which was his reply to an angry letter admonishing the drummer for kicking over his drum kit at the end of a live performance on the television show South Bank Pops from 1970.

On the back cover of earlier pressings, the opening track is listed as "Woman from Tokayo." Coincidentally, Ian Gillan's pronunciation of "Tokyo" in the song's refrain does resemble this misspelling.

== Release ==
Despite the chaotic birth of the album, "Woman from Tokyo" was a hit single and other songs picked up considerable airplay. In the United States, it sold half a million copies in its first three months, achieving a gold record award faster than any Deep Purple album released up to that time.

It hit number 4 in the UK charts and number 15 in the US charts. These numbers helped make Deep Purple the best-selling artist in the United States in 1973 (with the release of Made in Japan, the "Smoke on the Water" single, and the prior acclaim for Machine Head helping that album to continue selling well).

In 2000 Who Do We Think We Are was remastered and re-released with bonus tracks. The last bonus track is a lengthy instrumental jam called "First Day Jam" that features Ritchie Blackmore on bass. Roger Glover, the group's usual bassist, was absent, allegedly lost in traffic. Roger also did remixes of many tracks, but Mary Long was not included (it appears on 2002 box set, "Listen, Learn, Read On").

In 2005 Audio Fidelity released their own re-mastering of the album on 24 karat Gold CD.

== Reception ==
Professional ratings
Review scores
Source	Rating
AllMusic	2/5 stars
The Daily Vault	A−

The album received mixed reviews. Ann Cheauvy of Rolling Stone reviewed the album negatively and, comparing Who Do We Think We Are to Deep Purple's breakthrough album In Rock, wrote that the former "sounds so damn tired in spots that it's downright disconcerting", and "the band seems to just barely summon up enough energy to lay down the rhythm track, much less improvise." In a retrospective critical review, Eduardo Rivadavia of AllMusic expresses the same opinion and writes that, apart from "Woman from Tokyo", the album's songs are "wildly inconsistent and find the band simply going through the motions", although he does praise "Rat Bat Blue".

On the contrary, reviewer David Bowling writes in the Blogcritics site that Who Do We Think We Are "is one of the band’s strongest and stands near the top of the Deep Purple catalogue in terms of quality", providing "some of the best hard rock of the era".

== Track listing ==
All tracks are written by Ritchie Blackmore, Ian Gillan, Roger Glover, Jon Lord and Ian Paice.

Side one
No.	Title	Length
1.	"Woman from Tokyo"	5:49
2.	"Mary Long"	4:24
3.	"Super Trouper"	2:55
4.	"Smooth Dancer"	4:09

Side two
No.	Title	Length
1.	"Rat Bat Blue"	5:23
2.	"Place in Line"	6:30
3.	"Our Lady"	5:10

2000 Remastered CD Edition bonus tracks
No.	Title	Length
8.	"Woman from Tokyo" ('99 Remix)	6:37
9.	"Woman from Tokyo" (Alternate bridge)	1:24
10.	"Painted Horse" (studio out-take)	5:19
11.	"Our Lady" ('99 Remix)	6:05
12.	"Rat Bat Blue" (writing session)	0:57
13.	"Rat Bat Blue" ('99 Remix)	5:49
14.	"First Day Jam" (instrumental)	11:31

== Personnel ==
Deep Purple

- Ritchie Blackmore – guitars
- Ian Gillan – vocals
- Roger Glover – bass guitar
- Jon Lord – keyboards
- Ian Paice – drums, percussion

Additional personnel

- Produced by Deep Purple
- Martin Birch – engineer
- Jeremy Gee, Nick Watterton – Rolling Stones Mobile Unit operators
- Ian Paice and Roger Glover – mixing
- Ian Hansford, Rob Cooksey, Colin Hart, Ron Quinton – equipment
- Roger Glover and John Coletta – cover design
- Peter Denenberg with Roger Glover – bonus tracks remixing (2000 edition)
- Peter Mew – remastering (original album tracks) and mastering (bonus tracks) at Abbey Road Studios, London (2000 edition)

== Charts ==
=== Weekly charts ===
Chart (1973)	Peak position
Australian Albums (Kent Music Report)	5
Austrian Albums (Ö3 Austria)	2
Canada Top Albums/CDs (RPM)	11
Danish Albums (Hitlisten)	1
Dutch Albums (Album Top 100)	5
Finnish Albums (The Official Finnish Charts)	4
German Albums (Offizielle Top 100)	3
Japanese Albums (Oricon)	15
Norwegian Albums (VG-lista)	1
Spanish Albums (AFYVE)	12
Swedish Albums (Sverigetopplistan)	4
UK Albums (Official Charts)	4
US Billboard 200	15

Chart (2018)	Peak position
UK Rock & Metal Albums (Official Charts)	37

=== Year-end charts ===
Chart (1973)	Position
German Albums (Offizielle Top 100)	13

== Certifications and sales ==
Region	Certification	Certified units/sales
France (SNEP)	Gold	100,000^{*}
Sweden	—	25,000
United States (RIAA)	Gold	500,000^{^}
^{*} Sales figures based on certification alone.^{^} Shipments figures based on certification alone.
