= Child in Time =

- 1972 Belgian single

Song by Deep Purple

from the album Deep Purple in Rock
- Released: June 1970 (album); July 1972 (single)
- Recorded: 4 December 1969
- Studio: IBC (London)
- Genre: Art rock; hard rock; heavy metal; progressive rock
- Length: 10:18
- Label: Harvest (UK); Warner Bros. (US)
- Songwriters: Ritchie Blackmore; Ian Gillan; Roger Glover; Jon Lord; Ian Paice
- Producer: Deep Purple

Music video
- "Child in Time" on YouTube

"Child in Time" is a song by English rock band Deep Purple, released on their fourth studio album, Deep Purple in Rock in 1970. It is the longest track on the album, running over ten minutes. The song's lyrics are loosely inspired by the Cold War. The song is notable for showcasing singer Ian Gillan's full vocal range, and the instrumental interplay section between guitarist Ritchie Blackmore and organist Jon Lord.

== History and characteristics ==
Ian Gillan said that the organ riff in "Child in Time" is based on It's a Beautiful Day's 1969 song "Bombay Calling". It's a Beautiful Day in return borrowed Purple's "Wring That Neck" and turned it into "Don and Dewey" on their second album Marrying Maiden (1970). The song started with organist Jon Lord playing "Bombay Calling", which the band then re-arranged and changed the structure. Gillan had never heard the original song, and created lyrics about the Cold War to fit the music, later saying it "reflected the mood of the moment". The band then worked out instrumental lines to accompany this.

Gillan is quoted as saying that the song was created "using the Cold War as the theme", adding "the words came easily because we were all aware of the nuclear threat looming over us at what was probably the height of the Cold War."

With themes of war and inhumanity, the song is regarded as a heavy metal anthem and an example of art rock.

The first live recording was in September 1969, almost a year before the release of Deep Purple in Rock, during the performance of Concerto for Group and Orchestra. The recording was not included on the original album, but was later released in 1977 on the Powerhouse compilation album. Other live versions can be found on the 1972 live album Made in Japan, the Scandinavian Nights/Live in Stockholm live album, recorded in September 1970 and the BBC recordings released as Deep Purple In Concert. Gillan also featured a live jazz influenced version of the song in his Ian Gillan Band project of the late 1970s on Live at the Budokan album.

A staple of the Deep Purple live concerts in 1970–73 and later after their initial reunion tours of 1985, 1987–88, and 1993, the song was not featured regularly at concerts after 1995. It was re-added to the setlist for the band's 2002 European tour, with its final appearance in Deep Purple's live set being at Kharkiv's Opera Theatre in March of that year.

A shortened version of "Child in Time", with vocals by Candice Night and preceded and followed by their instrumental "Mond Tanz", appeared on the 2006 Blackmore's Night album The Village Lanterne.

== Charts ==
Chart (1972–2016)	Peak position
Belgium (Ultratop 50 Flanders)	26
France (SNEP)	36
Netherlands (Dutch Top 40)	9
Netherlands (Single Top 100)	10

=== Year-end charts ===
Chart (1972)	Position
Netherlands (Dutch Top 40)	39

== Accolades ==
"Child in Time" was ranked no. 1 on Radio Veronica's "Super All-Time List" in 1989. The song ranked at no. 16 in Guitarist's 1998 readers poll of Top 100 Guitar Solos of All-Time. English disc jockey John Peel's 1976 list of Festive Fifty featured the song at no. 25. It was second, third or fourth place for many years on the annual Dutch Top 2000 songs of all time.

== Covers and references in popular culture ==
- Ian Gillan performed the song with his Ian Gillan Band on the 1976 album Child in Time.
- The song was covered by Yngwie Malmsteen for his 1996 album Inspiration.
- The song was covered by Rata Blanca and Tarja in a show in Buenos Aires on 9 June 2009.
- Anu Malik drew inspiration from this song for the opening and closing portions of Aisa Zakhm Diya from the Hindi film Akele Hum Akele Tum.
- The studio version of the song is played by character Dusty (Philip Seymour Hoffman) during a driving montage in the 1996 film Twister. The live footage playing on his television is from Deep Purple's appearance at the California Jam in 1974, though "Child in Time" was not performed during this set.
- It was used in the final sequence of the 1999 Kevin Macdonald documentary One Day in September examining the 5 September 1972 murder of 11 Israeli athletes by Arabic terrorists at the 1972 Summer Olympics in Munich, Germany.
- The 2022 Netflix series 1899 features the song in the second episode before the end credits.
- In July 2025, a significantly remixed version of the song was used throughout the first trailer for the fifth and final season of the science fiction series Stranger Things.
- In the 2023 movie The Creator at the 42:05 minute mark when Joshua and Alphie are surrounded in a barn, the truck they escape in plays the original version of the song, starting at one of Gillan’s screams and continues playing over the truck’s radio as they break out of the barn.

== See also ==
- List of anti-war songs
- Deep Purple discography
