= Black Night =

1970 single by Deep Purple

Single by Deep Purple
- B-side: "Speed King" (UK); "Into the Fire" (US); "Living Wreck" (Germany)
- Released: 5 June 1970
- Recorded: May 1970
- Studio: De Lane Lea Studios
- Genre: Hard rock; boogie rock; heavy metal
- Length: 3:28
- Label: Harvest (UK); Warner Bros. (US)
- Songwriters: Ritchie Blackmore; Ian Gillan; Roger Glover; Jon Lord; Ian Paice
- Producer: Deep Purple

Deep Purple singles chronology
"Hallelujah" (1969)	"Black Night" (1970)	"Strange Kind of Woman" (1971)

Official audio
- "Black Night" (1995 Remaster) on YouTube

"Black Night" is a song by the English hard rock band Deep Purple, released as a single in June 1970. "Black Night" became a hit in August 1970 peaking at No. 1 on UK New Musical Express and Melody Maker charts, while reaching No. 2 on the UK singles chart, and remains Deep Purple's highest charting UK single. It also topped the chart in Switzerland, and is one of only two singles from the band to chart in Ireland, peaking at No. 4, thus making it the group's only Irish Top 10 hit. It was later included on the 25th anniversary version of their 1970 studio album, Deep Purple in Rock.

== Writing process and recording ==
Once Deep Purple in Rock had been completed, EMI asked for a suitable single to be recorded to help promote the album. Though Roger Glover states that Ricky Nelson's 1962 hard rocking arrangement of the George Gershwin song "Summertime" was the basis for the Mk II Deep Purple single "Black Night", it is also similar to Blues Magoos's 1966 psychedelic hit song "(We Ain't Got) Nothin' Yet". In the BBC documentary Heavy Metal Britannia, keyboardist Jon Lord supports Glover's statement about the song's origin, stating "Black Night was nicked from the bass line in Ricky Nelson's Summertime" and then proceeds to play the bassline riff on his grand piano.

== Live performances ==
"Black Night" made its way into the setlist soon after release, generally as the first encore. It was not played in full after Ian Gillan and Roger Glover left the band in 1973, but snippets were often played by Ritchie Blackmore as part of his improvisations. On the reformation of Deep Purple in 1984, it returned as part of the main set list. The song is featured on many Deep Purple live albums.

== Charts ==
Weekly chart performance for "Black Night"
Chart (1970–71)	Peak position
Australia (Kent Music Report)	14
Austria (Ö3 Austria Top 40)	4
Belgium (Ultratop 50 Flanders)	6
Belgium (Ultratop 50 Wallonia)	1
Canada (RPM)	67
Finland (Suomen virallinen lista)	34
Ireland (IRMA)	4
Italy (Musica e dischi)	16
Netherlands (Singles Top 100)	8
New Zealand (Listener)	13
Norway (VG-lista)	2
South Africa (Springbok)	6
Switzerland (Schweizer Hitparade)	1
UK Singles (OCC)	2
US Billboard Hot 100	66
West Germany (Official German Charts)	2

== Personnel ==
- Ian Gillan – vocals
- Ritchie Blackmore – guitars
- Roger Glover – bass
- Ian Paice – drums
- Jon Lord – organ
