= California Jamming =

Live album by Deep Purple
- Released: 27 May 1996
- Recorded: 6 April 1974
- Genre: Hard rock, Heavy metal
- Length: 73:26 (Original edition); 78:48 (Remastered edition)
- Label: Purple
- Producer: Deep Purple

Deep Purple live albums chronology
King Biscuit Flower Hour Presents: Deep Purple in Concert (1995)	California Jamming (1996)	Mk III: The Final Concerts (1996)

Professional ratings
Review scores
Source	Rating
AllMusic	3/5 stars

California Jamming is a live album by English hard rock band Deep Purple, recorded in 1974 and originally released in 1996. It was re-released as a remastered edition, titled Just Might Take Your Life, in 2003 with the complete concert including the missing track "Lay Down, Stay Down".

The album is a live recording of Deep Purple's infamous appearance at the California Jam Festival on 6 April 1974, which was televised by ABC-TV in prime time. It was one of the first to feature their third line-up, which included vocalist David Coverdale and bassist/vocalist Glenn Hughes. At the end of the show, guitarist Ritchie Blackmore first attacked one of the network's video cameras (which had been getting between him and the audience) with his guitar, and then had his amplifiers doused with gasoline and set on fire, which caused an explosion.

Most of this concert was broadcast over 4 weekends in April 1974 on KLOS-FM ABC-TV Stereo Simulcast, along with other California Jam artists.

== Releases ==
Deep Purple's performance at the California Jam was first released as an audio album in 1996 as California Jamming, though one song, "Lay Down, Stay Down", was missing. In 2003, the album was reissued as Just Might Take Your Life, with "Lay Down, Stay Down" restored.

The first video release of this concert was on videotape and Laserdisc in 1981, under the title California Jam in Japan and the UK. It was released on DVD in 2005 as Live in California 74.

== Track listing ==
1996 original release
No.	Title	Writers	Length
1.	"Burn"	Ritchie Blackmore, David Coverdale, Glenn Hughes, Jon Lord, Ian Paice	6:21
2.	"Might Just Take Your Life"	Blackmore, Coverdale, Hughes, Lord, Paice	4:41
3.	"Mistreated"	Blackmore, Coverdale	10:13
4.	"Smoke on the Water"	Blackmore, Ian Gillan, Roger Glover, Lord, Paice	8:26
5.	"You Fool No One" "The Mule"	Blackmore, Coverdale, Hughes, Lord, Paice; Blackmore, Gillan, Glover, Lord, Paice	18:42
6.	"Space Truckin'"	Blackmore, Gillan, Glover, Lord, Paice	25:13

2003 remastered edition
No.	Title	Length
1.	"Burn"	6:20
2.	"Might Just Take Your Life"	4:49
3.	"Lay Down, Stay Down" (Blackmore, Coverdale, Hughes, Lord, Paice)	4:45
4.	"Mistreated"	10:24
5.	"Smoke on the Water"	8:55
6.	"You Fool No One/The Mule"	19:08
7.	"Space Truckin'"	25:12

== Personnel ==
Deep Purple

- Ritchie Blackmore – guitars
- Jon Lord – organ, synthesizer
- Ian Paice – drums
- David Coverdale – lead vocals
- Glenn Hughes – bass, vocals
