= Live in California 74 =

Video by Deep Purple
- Released: November 21, 2005
- Recorded: April 6, 1974
- Genre: Hard rock Heavy metal
- Length: 117:00 (DVD); 85:58, 1974 concert 13:23, Alt camera angles 10:18, Super 8 mm film 7:20, Archive preview
- Label: EMI – Eagle Rock Entertainment
- Producer: Drew Thomson T2 Media; Tony Edwards DP (0)

Deep Purple video chronology
Live in Concert 72/73 (1972)	Live in California 74 (2005)	Rises Over Japan (1975)

Live in California 74 is a live DVD of the first California Jam concert performance from Deep Purple released in 2005. It was recorded and aired live by ABC-TV on 6 April 1974 at the Ontario Motor Speedway near Los Angeles, California. This concert was one of the first ever music concerts issued on videotape and laser disc in 1981 under the title California Jam in Japan and the UK.

This is the first official release on DVD of the complete concert. "Lay Down, Stay Down" was not included on the original video release. The camera angles are also different from the original 1981 release, from which two songs are provided as bonus items.

The first four songs are from the newly released album Burn. Other songs are from the Made in Japan setlist. "Smoke on the Water", "Space Truckin'" and also "Lazy" and "The Mule", which are played as intro and outro during "You Fool No One".

Deep Purple continued to perform concerts worldwide, including an appearance at the 1974 'California Jam', a televised concert festival that also included many other prominent bands. At the moment Deep Purple were due to appear, Ritchie Blackmore locked himself in his dressing room and refused to go onstage. Previous performers had finished early, and it was still not sunset, the time at which the band had originally been scheduled to start. Blackmore felt this would dull the effect of the band's light show. After ABC brought in a sheriff to arrest him, Blackmore agreed to perform. At the culmination of the performance, he destroyed several of his guitars and threw one of his amplifier stacks off the edge of the stage. He also struck one of the ABC cameras five times with a guitar and, in recorded footage, can be seen arranging for his road crew to set off a pyrotechnic device in one of his amplifiers, creating a large fireball that was quickly extinguished. The band quickly exited the venue by helicopter, avoiding fire marshals, police officers and ABC executives.

== Track listing ==
1. "Intro" - 1:27
2. "Burn" (Ritchie Blackmore, Jon Lord, Ian Paice, David Coverdale) - 7:30
3. "Might Just Take Your Life" (Blackmore, Lord, Paice, Coverdale) - 5:54
4. "Lay Down, Stay Down" (Blackmore, Lord, Paice, Coverdale) - 5:11
5. "Mistreated" (Blackmore, Coverdale) - 12:12
6. "Smoke on the Water" (Blackmore, Ian Gillan, Roger Glover, Lord, Paice) - 8:54
7. "You Fool No One" (Blackmore, Lord, Paice, Coverdale) - 19:07
8. "Space Truckin' " (Blackmore, Gillan, Glover, Lord, Paice) - 25:39

=== Bonus tracks ===
1. "Burn" - 8:21
2. "Might Just Take Your Life" - 5:02

=== Archive preview ===
Live in Concert 72/73

1. "Highway Star" (Blackmore, Gillan, Glover, Lord, Paice) - 7:27

== Personnel ==
Deep Purple

- Ritchie Blackmore: guitars
- David Coverdale: lead vocals
- Glenn Hughes: bass, vocals
- Jon Lord: organ, keyboards
- Ian Paice: drums

== Accolades ==
Publication	Country	Accolade	Year	Rank
Classic Rock	United Kingdom	"Classic Rock DVD of the Year 2005"	2006	10

(*) designates unordered lists.

== Certifications ==
Region	Certification	Certified units/sales
Argentina (CAPIF)	Gold	4,000^{^}
France (SNEP)	Gold	10,000^{*}
^{*} Sales figures based on certification alone.^{^} Shipments figures based on certification alone.
