= Phoenix Rising (Deep Purple album) =

Phoenix Rising (Coverdale • Hughes • Bolin • Paice • Lord)

Live album by Deep Purple
- Released: 11 May 2011
- Recorded: Live on 15 December 1975 at the Budokan, Tokyo, Japan & on 27 February 1976 at Long Beach Arena, Los Angeles, CA
- Genres: Hard rock, heavy metal
- Length: 70:13 (CD) 142:00 (DVD)
- Label: Edel
- Producers: Deep Purple (CD) Drew Thompson & Tony Edwards (DVD)

Deep Purple Video chronology
| History, hits & highlights '68–'76 (2009) | Phoenix Rising (Coverdale • Hughes • Bolin • Paice • Lord) (2011) | Live at Montreux 2011 (2011) |

Phoenix Rising is a combo CD/DVD live album by the Mark IV line-up of Deep Purple, released in May 2011. It includes rare live tracks from Mk IV history, Rises Over Japan, a 30 minute concert film directed by Tony Klinger, Gettin' Tighter, a new 80-minute documentary about the band's 1975/1976 tour, and some extras.

== Overview ==
The concert film Rises Over Japan was made at Budokan Hall on 15 December 1975. The concert was released on LP in an incomplete form as Last Concert in Japan in 1977 and the whole concert was issued in 2001 as This Time Around: Live in Tokyo. The footage was shot professionally with multiple cameras on 16mm film. Despite this, for many years only very poor quality bootleg copies from an obscure Japanese VHS release circulated among fans and collectors. Finally, after over 36 years the concert was restored from the original 31 minute print and released as a bonus feature on the Phoenix Rising Blu-ray Disc in 2011, complete with the original stereo sound mix and a new 5.1 surround sound mix.

In May 2012, Phoenix Rising won German Leserwahl award as the Best Music Blu-ray.

== Track listing ==
=== CD ===
The Official Soundtrack and More – Rare Live Tracks from MKIV History
| No. | Title | Recording venue and date | Length |
|---|---|---|---|
| 1. | "Burn" | Long Beach Arena, 27 February 1976 | 8:09 |
| 2. | "Getting Tighter" | Budokan, 15 December 1975 | 15:04 |
| 3. | "Love Child" | Budokan, 15 December 1975 | 4:23 |
| 4. | "Smoke on the Water" (including "Georgia") | Budokan, 15 December 1975 | 9:29 |
| 5. | "Lazy" (includes drum solo) | Long Beach Arena, 27 February 1976 | 11:41 |
| 6. | "Homeward Strut" | Long Beach Arena, 27 February 1976 | 5:44 |
| 7. | "You Keep on Moving" | Budokan, 15 December 1975 | 5:44 |
| 8. | "Stormbringer" | Long Beach Arena, 27 February 1976 | 9:49 |

=== DVD and Blu-Ray ===
- Deep Purple Rises Over Japan (30 minute concert)
1. "Burn" (Ritchie Blackmore, David Coverdale, Glenn Hughes, Jon Lord, Ian Paice)
2. "Love Child" (Tommy Bolin, Coverdale)
3. "Smoke on the Water" (Blackmore, Ian Gillan, Roger Glover, Lord, Paice)
4. "You Keep on Moving" (Coverdale, Hughes)
5. "Highway Star" (Blackmore, Gillan, Glover, Lord, Paice)
- Gettin' Tighter - The Untold Story of the 1975/1976 MKIV World Tour (80 minute music documentary)
- Extras
1. Jakarta, December 1975 – Interview with Jon Lord & Glenn Hughes
2. Come Taste the Band – Electronic Press Kit

== Personnel ==
Deep Purple

- Tommy Bolin – guitars, vocals
- David Coverdale – lead vocals
- Glenn Hughes – bass, vocals
- Jon Lord – keyboards, organ, backing vocals
- Ian Paice – drums, percussion

== Charts ==
| Chart (2011) | Peak position |
|---|---|
| Germany | 22 |
| Norway | 38 |
| Austria | 50 |
| Switzerland | 61 |
| UK | 188 |
