= History, Hits & Highlights '68–'76 =

Video by Deep Purple
- Released: June 3, 2009
- Recorded: 1968–1976
- Genre: Hard rock, heavy metal
- Length: Disc one: 152:21; Disc two: 140:42
- Label: Eagle Vision

Deep Purple chronology
Around the World Live (2008)	History, Hits & Highlights '68–'76 (2009)	Phoenix Rising (2011)

History, Hits & Highlights '68–'76 is a 2 disc DVD release by Deep Purple.

This is vol. 3 in a series of DVD archive releases aimed to provide Deep Purple fans with DVDs rounding up as much rare footage from the 1968-1976 era as possible. The vol. 3 Archive DVDs contains a large collection of individual performances from TV around Europe, as well as rounding up some of the longer video segments known to exist plus an introduction to the band's history.

Live in Concert 72/73 and Live in California 74 are vol. 1 and vol. 2 in the archive series.

Despite being released in 2009, much of the widescreen material on the disc is non-anamorphic.

== Track listing ==
=== Disc one ===
==== HISTORY ====
1. "History" (7:14 - 1968-1970)
2. "History" (6:30 - 1971-1972)
3. "History" (7:01 - 1973-1976)

==== HITS ====
1. "Help!" (5:24 - Danish TV 1968)
2. "Hush" (4:13 - Playboy After Dark 1968)
3. "Wring That Neck" (3:19 - Canadian TV 1969)
4. "Hallelujah" (3:40 - Beat Club 1969)
5. "Mandrake Root" (12:27 - South Bank Summer 1970)
6. "Speed King" (4:15 - WDR Vicky Leandros 1970)
7. "Black Night" (3:13 - Top of the Pops 1970)
8. "Child in Time" (9:35 - Doing Their Thing 1970)
9. "Lazy" (11:01 - Copenhagen 1972)
10. "Strange Kind of Woman" (4:01 - Top of the Pops 1971)
11. "Fireball writing session" (2:59 - ABC TV Australia 1971)
12. "Fireball" (3:30 - Disco ZDF 1971)
13. "Demon's Eye" (10:09 - RBB Germany 1971)
14. "No No No" (7:20 - Beat Club 1971)
15. "Into the Fire" (4:09 - RBB Germany 1971)
16. "Never Before" (3:39 - promo 1972)
17. "Highway Star" (6:06 - Beat Club 1971)
18. "Smoke On the Water" (5:19 - Hofstra 1973)
19. "Burn" (6:14 - Leeds Polytechnic Project 1974)
20. "Mistreated" (10:20 - California Jam 1974)
21. "Love Child" (4:20 - Tokyo 1975)
22. "You Keep On Moving" (6:13 - Tokyo 1975)

=== Disc two ===
==== HIGHLIGHTS ====
1. "And the Address" (2:57 - Playboy After Dark 1968)
2. "Wring That Neck" (25:01 - Jazz Bilzen 1969)
3. "Wring That Neck" (10:58 - 'Pop Deux' Paris 1970)
4. "Mandrake Root" (14:33 - 'Pop Deux' Paris 1970)
5. "Black Night" (3:10 - Promo clip 1970)
6. "No No No" (rehearsals take one) (7:36 - Beat Club 1971)
7. "No No No" (rehearsals take two) (7:40 - Beat Club 1971)
8. "'Je Nuit’ French TV 1974" (3:09 - INA France 1974)
9. "Burn" (6:46 - Leeds Polytechnic Project 1974)
10. "Interview" (20:56 - Leeds Polytechnic Project 1974)
11. "Space Truckin’" (12:36 - Leeds Polytechnic Project 1974)
12. "New Zealand TV Documentary" (5:43 - New Zealand TV 1975)
13. "Interview" (14:12 - New Zealand TV 1975)
14. "Smoke On the Water" (3:04 - New Zealand TV 1975)
15. "Tony Edwards french TV interview 1976" (2:14 - French TV 1976)

== Personnel ==
- Mk 1: 1968-1969 - Ritchie Blackmore, Rod Evans, Jon Lord, Ian Paice, Nick Simper
- Mk 2: 1969-1973 - Ritchie Blackmore, Ian Gillan, Roger Glover, Jon Lord, Ian Paice
- Mk 3: 1973-1975 - Ritchie Blackmore, David Coverdale, Glenn Hughes, Jon Lord, Ian Paice
- Mk 4: 1975-1976 - Tommy Bolin, David Coverdale, Glenn Hughes, Jon Lord, Ian Paice
