= Mk III: The Final Concerts =

Live album by Deep Purple
- Released: 5 August 1996
- Recorded: in Graz, Austria & Paris in April 1975
- Genre: Heavy metal, hard rock
- Label: Connoisseur Collection (Mk III: The Final Concerts) or Navarre (Archive Alive)
- Producer: Deep Purple

Deep Purple live albums chronology
| California Jamming (1996) | Mk III: The Final Concerts (1996) | Live at the Olympia '96 (1997) |

Professional ratings
Review scores
| Source | Rating |
|---|---|
| AllMusic | 3/5 stars |

MK III: The Final Concerts, alternatively entitled Archive Alive, is a live album by Deep Purple, recorded during the band's 1975 European tour in support of the Stormbringer album. It was released in 1996.

This double CD release is culled from the final performances from Deep Purple MK III featuring Ritchie Blackmore before he left to launch his new band Rainbow with singer Ronnie James Dio. The album features for the most part material from the last concert of the tour held at the Palais des Sports, Paris 7 April 1975, with a few tracks taken from two shows in Graz, Austria, 3 and 4 April.

== History ==
At the time of the taping of the shows, the rest of the band was unaware of Blackmore's decision to leave the band by tour's end. Managers decided to tape the last 3 shows (Paris, Graz and Saarbrücken) in order to have some product available for release in the event of the band splitting up.

After the end of the tour, and facing the prospect of the end of the band, Jon Lord mentioned to the press the upcoming release of a double live set consisting of performances from the last European tour. However, as the band decided to carry on, the plans for the release were scrapped.

In 1976, after the definitive breakup of the band, the single disc Made in Europe live album was released, using some of the material previously mentioned by Lord (from the Saarbrücken show), but apparently none of the material included on this release. Made in Europe was met with mixed reactions, as some argued that it failed to capture the energy that the band displayed live. Additionally, some resented what they felt was a healthy amount of studio editing.

Blackmore's lack of enthusiasm, as well as band tension onstage, are fairly evident on some of the tracks: Blackmore unexpectedly loses his way on the intro for "Mistreated" and he seems totally surprised by Lord's solo on "Lady Double Dealer" (the studio version of this song lacks a keyboard solo).

The alternate takes of "Mistreated" and "You Fool No One" on disc two are from the Graz shows, and although the liner notes mention "technical problems" on the Paris tapes as the justification for their inclusion, it is more likely that their inclusion has more to do with mistakes by the band.

Strangely, the alternate take of "You Fool No One" lacks Ian Paice's trademark drum solo, even after being announced by David Coverdale.

During the intro jam for "You Fool No One" Blackmore played riffs from the songs "Still I'm Sad" and "Man on the Silver Mountain" from Rainbow's first LP Ritchie Blackmore's Rainbow, which had already been recorded only weeks before these shows.

== Track listing ==
Disc 1
| No. | Title | Length |
|---|---|---|
| 1. | "Burn" (Ritchie Blackmore, David Coverdale, Jon Lord, Ian Paice) | 7:33 |
| 2. | "Stormbringer" (Blackmore, Coverdale) | 4:38 |
| 3. | "Gypsy" (Blackmore, Coverdale, Glenn Hughes, Lord, Paice) | 5:40 |
| 4. | "Lady Double Dealer" (Blackmore, Coverdale) | 3:53 |
| 5. | "Mistreated" (Blackmore, Coverdale) | 12:38 |
| 6. | "Smoke on the Water" (Blackmore, Ian Gillan, Roger Glover, Lord, Paice) | 10:17 |
| 7. | "You Fool No One" (Blackmore, Coverdale, Lord, Paice) | 13:24 |

Disc 2
| No. | Title | Length |
|---|---|---|
| 8. | "Space Truckin'" (Blackmore, Gillan, Glover, Lord, Paice) | 19:54 |
| 9. | "Going Down/Highway Star" (Don Nix/Blackmore, Gillan, Glover, Lord, Paice) | 15:13 |

Bonus tracks: Graz show
| No. | Title | Length |
|---|---|---|
| 10. | "Mistreated" | 14:13 |
| 11. | "You Fool No One" | 12:43 |

- Tracks 1, 2, 8, 10 and 11 are from Graz show, all others from Paris show.
- The intro to "Smoke on the Water" includes an excerpt from "Lazy".
- Track 7 includes an Ian Paice drum solo and "The Mule".
- Track 11 includes "The Mule"; the drum solo has been edited out.

== Personnel ==
Deep Purple

- Ritchie Blackmore – guitars
- David Coverdale – lead vocals
- Glenn Hughes – bass, Vocals
- Jon Lord – keyboards
- Ian Paice – drums
