= Made in Europe =

Live album by Deep Purple
- Released: November 1976
- Recorded: 4 April 1975 in Graz, Austria, 5 April 1975 in Saarbrücken, Germany and 7 April 1975 in Paris, France
- Genres: Hard rock, heavy metal
- Length: 45:47
- Labels: EMI/Purple (UK); Warner Bros. (US)
- Producers: Deep Purple & Martin Birch

Deep Purple live albums chronology
Made in Japan (1972)	Made in Europe (1976)	Last Concert in Japan (1977)

Made in Europe is a 1976 live album released by Deep Purple, recorded on the final dates in April 1975 before Ritchie Blackmore left the group. It was released in November 1976, after the group had broken up. It is the band's third live album. They tried to gain the same success as they did with 1972's Made in Japan, hence the title, but it didn't perform as well commercially.

== Recording ==
Made in Europe features songs recorded in concert on 4 April in Graz, Austria, 5 April in Saarbrücken, Germany, and 7 April 1975 at Palais des Sports in Paris, France with the Rolling Stones Mobile Studio. According to the liner notes included on Mk III: The Final Concerts, though, the material featured on Made in Europe came, for the most part, from the Saarbrücken show. The album is said to have experienced extensive studio editing and/or overdubbing of crowd noise and applause. Certainly there is a tape-loop of applause, given away by a whistling fan during the last recording of Stormbringer.

The songs featured on the album are from Deep Purple's Burn and Stormbringer albums.

In 1990, the album was remastered and re-released in the US by Metal Blade Records with distribution by Warner Bros.

This record, which had been out of print in the US, was re-released by Friday Music label on 31 July 2007 (along with Stormbringer and Come Taste the Band). While the label's website claims that the album has been digitally remastered, it is unclear which tapes were used as a source for this release.

The Graz and Paris concerts, of which some of the content for this release is sourced, have been released in full (for unexplained reasons, the drum solo from the Graz concert is missing) by Deep Purple (Overseas) Limited and Ear Music.

In 2014, a "super deluxe" boxset of the album was announced, promising to contain the entire Saarbrücken show for the first time, as well as a new MK 3 documentary movie. However, as of April 2026, no news or updates have been made about its release.

== Reception ==
Professional ratings
Review scores
Source	Rating
AllMusic	2.5/5 stars
Select	3/5 medals

== Track listing ==
All tracks are written by Ritchie Blackmore and David Coverdale except where noted.

Side one
No.	Title	Studio album	Length
1.	"Burn" (Blackmore, Coverdale, Glenn Hughes, Jon Lord, Ian Paice)	Burn (1974)	7:32
2.	"Mistreated" (interpolating "Rock Me Baby)" (Joe Josea, B.B. King)	Burn (1974)	11:32
3.	"Lady Double Dealer"	Stormbringer (1974)	4:15

Side two
No.	Title	Studio album	Length
4.	"You Fool No One" (Blackmore, Coverdale, Hughes, Lord, Paice)	Burn (1974)	16:42
5.	"Stormbringer"	Stormbringer (1974)	5:38

== Personnel ==
Deep Purple

- Ritchie Blackmore – guitars
- David Coverdale – lead vocals
- Glenn Hughes – bass, vocals
- Jon Lord – Hammond organ, keyboards
- Ian Paice – drums

Additional Personnel

- Produced by Deep Purple and Martin Birch
- Engineered by Mick Mckenna, Tapani Tapanainen and Martin Birch
- Mixed by Ian Paice and Martin Birch

== Charts ==
Chart (1976)	Peak position
German Albums (Offizielle Top 100)	10
Italian Albums (Musica e Dischi)	12
Japanese Albums (Oricon)	19
New Zealand Albums (RMNZ)	32
Spanish Albums (AFYVE)	17
Swedish Albums (Sverigetopplistan)	25
UK Albums (Official Charts)	12
US Billboard 200	148
