= Live in Concert 1972/73 =

Live in Concert 72/73

Video by Deep Purple
- Released: July 25, 2005
- Recorded: March 1, 1972; May 29, 1973
- Genre: Hard rock Heavy metal
- Length: 127:00 (DVD); 97:19, 1972 concert 22:22, 1973 concert 7:31, 1974 bonus (Burn)
- Label: EMI
- Producer: Drew Thomson T2 Media; Tony Edwards DP (0)

Deep Purple video chronology
Concerto for Group and Orchestra (1969)	Live in Concert 72/73 (2005)	Live in California 74 (1974)

Scandinavian Nights - Live in Denmark 1972

Live in Concert 72/73 is a live DVD from Deep Purple, released in 2005. The DVD was certified Gold on August 3, 2007 by the RIAA, after selling 50,000 copies in the US. The performance was recorded at KB Hallen in Copenhagen, Denmark in 1972, but not released until 1987 in Japan, under the title Machine Head Live 1972, and in Europe three years later under the title Scandinavian Nights (Live in Denmark 1972).

It is the only full concert filmed (in black and white) of the Mk II lineup in this era and features a rare live version of "Fireball". The DVD release also features three tracks from 1973, filmed during a US concert in New York City at Hofstra University in Hempstead, Long Island, in colour. It features the only known official 1970's video recording of "Smoke on the Water", performed by the Mark II lineup, aside from some recovered footage of it being performed in Tokyo on August 17, 1972, which was later released to the public on May 16, 2016.

== Copenhagen - March 1972 ==
All songs written by Ritchie Blackmore, Ian Gillan, Roger Glover, Jon Lord and Ian Paice except where indicated.

1. "Highway Star" - 7:27
2. "Strange Kind of Woman" - 9:09
3. "Child in Time" - 17:27
4. "The Mule" - 9:20
5. "Lazy" - 11:06
6. "Space Truckin'" - 24:44
7. "Fireball" - 4:04
8. "Lucille" (Al Collins, Richard Penniman) - 6:25
9. "Black Night" - 6:29

== New York - May 1973 ==
1. "Strange Kind of Woman" - 6:18
2. "Smoke on the Water" - 5:20
3. "Space Truckin'" - 10:43

== Bonus Track ==
California Jam 1974 Bonus Vision

13. "Burn" (Blackmore, Lord, Paice, David Coverdale) - 7:31

== Personnel ==
- Ritchie Blackmore: guitars
- Ian Gillan: vocals, congas, maracas
- Roger Glover: bass, tambourine on "Strange Kind Of Woman"
- Jon Lord: organ, keyboards
- Ian Paice: drums

== Additional notes ==
- Live in Concert 72/73 is Vol. 1 in a series of DVD archive releases aimed to provide Deep Purple fans with DVDs rounding up as much rare footage from the 1968-1976 era as possible. Vol. 2 is Live in California 74 released at the end of 2005.
- A bit of swearing was cut out at the beginning of "Space Truckin'".

== Certifications ==
Region	Certification	Certified units/sales
Australia (ARIA) Album certification	Gold	35,000^{^}
Australia (ARIA) Video certification	Gold	7,500^{^}
France (SNEP)	Gold	10,000^{*}
United States (RIAA)	Gold	50,000^{^}
^{*} Sales figures based on certification alone.^{^} Shipments figures based on certification alone.
