= This Time Around: Live in Tokyo =

Live album by Deep Purple
- Released: September 2001
- Recorded: 15 December 1975
- Venue: Nippon Budokan (Tokyo)
- Genre: Hard rock, heavy metal
- Length: 125:37
- Label: Purple (UK)

Deep Purple live albums chronology
Live at the Rotterdam Ahoy (2001)	This Time Around: Live in Tokyo (2001)	The Soundboard Series (2001)

Professional ratings
Review scores
Source	Rating
Allmusic	link

This Time Around: Live in Tokyo is a live album by Deep Purple. After the band's demise in 1976, a live album called Last Concert in Japan was released in 1977. It was compiled from a show the band did in Tokyo on 15 December 1975. It was heavily edited and, coming on the heels of their previous Japanese-recorded album Made in Japan, it failed to deliver, and was never released neither in UK nor in the US. In 2001, the complete show was released as This Time Around: Live in Tokyo '75.

== Track listing ==
Disc one
No.	Title	Writer(s)	Length
1.	"Burn"	Ritchie Blackmore, David Coverdale, Jon Lord, Ian Paice	8:08
2.	"Lady Luck"	Jeff Cook, Coverdale	2:58
3.	"Love Child"	Tommy Bolin, Coverdale	4:29
4.	"Gettin' Tighter"	Bolin, Glenn Hughes	16:02
5.	"Smoke on the Water/Georgia on My Mind"	Blackmore, Ian Gillan, Roger Glover, Lord, Paice / Hoagy Carmichael, Stuart Gorrell	9:31
6.	"Wild Dogs"	Bolin, John Tesar	6:05

Disc Two
No.	Title	Writer(s)	Length
1.	"I Need Love"	Bolin, Coverdale	5:47
2.	"Soldier of Fortune"	Blackmore, Coverdale	1:47
3.	"Jon Lord solo"	Lord	9:43
4.	"Lazy" (also contains a drum solo)	Blackmore, Gillan, Glover, Lord, Paice	13:07
5.	"This Time Around"	Hughes, Lord	3:38
6.	"Owed to G"	Bolin	3:29
7.	"Tommy Bolin guitar solo"	Bolin	7:09
8.	"Drifter"	Bolin, Coverdale	4:55
9.	"You Keep on Moving"	Coverdale, Hughes	5:59
10.	"Stormbringer"	Blackmore, Coverdale	8:51
11.	"Highway Star"	Blackmore, Gillan, Glover, Lord, Paice	7:30

== Personnel ==
Deep Purple

- Tommy Bolin – guitars, lead vocals on "Wild Dogs"
- David Coverdale – lead vocals
- Glenn Hughes – bass guitar, lead and backing vocals
- Ian Paice – drums
- Jon Lord – keyboards, backing vocals

== See also ==
- Rises Over Japan
