= Bright Shark =

Bright Shark is a thriller novel written by Robert Ballard and Tony Chiu. The plot centers on the recent rediscovery of an Israeli submarine (the INS Dakar) and its top secret cargo, code named Bright Shark. Now to keep the secret an undersea weapon will be deployed to bury the secret at the cost of global disaster.
