= Rises Over Japan =

- Original poster
- Directed by: Tony Klinger
- Produced by: Martin Birch
- Starring: Deep Purple
- Edited by: Clive Smith; Tony Klinger
- Music by: Deep Purple
- Distributed by: Warner Bros. Pictures
- Release date: March 1985
- Running time: 31 minutes
- Language: English

Rises Over Japan is a concert film by the Mark IV of Deep Purple, directed by Tony Klinger and released in 1985.

This Japanese film includes 5 songs from a concert at Budokan Hall on December 15, 1975. The audio of the very same concert was released in an incomplete form as Last Concert in Japan in 1977 and the whole concert was issued in 2001 as This Time Around: Live in Tokyo.

The footage was shot professionally with multiple cameras on 16mm film, despite this, for many years only very poor quality bootleg copies from an obscure Japanese VHS release circulated among fans and collectors. Finally, after over 35 years the concert was restored from the original 31 minute print and released as a feature on the Deep Purple: Phoenix Rising Blu-ray Disc in 2011, complete with the original stereo sound mix and a new 5.1 surround sound mix.

== Track listing ==
1. "Burn" (Blackmore, Coverdale, Lord, Paice)
2. "Love Child" (Coverdale, Tommy Bolin)
3. "Smoke on the Water" (Ritchie Blackmore, Ian Gillan, Roger Glover, Jon Lord, Ian Paice)
4. "You Keep on Moving" (David Coverdale, Glenn Hughes)
5. "Highway Star" (Blackmore, Gillan, Glover, Lord, Paice)

== Personnel ==
Deep Purple

- Tommy Bolin - guitars, vocals
- David Coverdale - lead vocals
- Glenn Hughes - bass, vocals
- Jon Lord - keyboards, organ, backing vocals
- Ian Paice - drums, percussion

== Production ==
- Tony Klinger: Director, editor.
- Martin Birch: Film & record producer, engineer, recorder.
- Clive Smith: Film editor.
