= Full Circle (2008 film) =

- Directed by: Tony Klinger; Arnon Manor
- Narrated by: Rick Zieff
- Release date: 13 January 2008
- Running time: 87 min
- Language: English
- Budget: $1,000,000 (est)

Full Circle is a 2008 full-length documentary film about the INS Dakar, an Israeli Sea Corps submarine that disappeared in 1968, the wreckage of which was found in 1999.

The film was co-directed by Tony Klinger and Arnon Manor, and narrated by Rick Zieff.

The movie, which took ten years to make, premiered in the UK on 13 January 2008, in a charity showing in aid of World Jewish Relief.
