= Tony Klinger =

British film producer and director (born 1950)

- Born: 29 January 1950 (age 76); Hackney, London
- Occupations: Writer, filmmaker, international executive, academic
- Website: www.tonydklinger.com

Tony Klinger (born 29 January 1950) is a British filmmaker, author and media executive. He began his career as an assistant director on the TV series The Avengers in the 1960s, later directing several rockumentaries and continuing to work across various media roles.

Klinger is the son of film producer Michael Klinger, with whom he worked on the 1971 crime thriller Get Carter, starring Michael Caine.

== Early life and education ==
Klinger was born at Hackney Salvation Army Hospital. By the age of 9, he had decided to pursue a career in filmmaking. While attending Harrow High School, he won writing competitions and co-founded an underground school magazine called Fanfare. At 18, he began developing scripts and producing short films.

== Career ==
Klinger has held various role in the media industry, including assistant director, editor, and senior production roles on the action-adventure films Gold (1974) and Shout at the Devil (1976). He directed rock documentaries featuring Deep Purple (Deep Purple Rises Over Japan and The Butterfly Ball) and The Who, including the 1979 documentary The Kids Are Alright.

Klinger has been president or chief executive for several media production, sales and distribution companies in the UK and USA, including Acton Communications & Entertainment Inc., Small Giant Media Ltd., and Production TLMH Ltd. He was chief executive of TLMH until the end of 2006.

At Bournemouth Film School, he served as a lecturer for undergraduate programs, as well as creator and course director for their Kickstart course. He was course leader for the MA Film Production and BA Foundation Degree courses at the Northern Film Schools and was the director of the Media Production Centre at the University of East London.

Klinger has served on international boards such as The Association of Media Practice Educators (AMPE) and The Audition for Hollywood Company. He co-founded the Screen Commission Northants and served as Patron of The UK Film School Charity and the NEL Creative and Cultural Strategy Board, where he represented the digital and creative sectors.

2008 saw Klinger premiere his film, Full Circle.

Klinger's book, Twilight of the Gods, recalling the making of the film The Kids Are Alright, was published in 2009.

In 2010, Klinger launched bCreative, a social networking website for those who wish to work in the creative arts.

His documentary film Mister Producer, about his late father, Michael Klinger, was screened in 2021.

In 2012 Klinger directed music videos for Honest John Plain featuring The Pretenders, Hanoi Rocks and Mott the Hoople amongst others. He also shot the material for the upcoming psychic stars, Hide & Peel who are soon to hit the circuit in both the United States and UK.

His play A Tired Heart & The Big C premiered in 2015.

Klinger founded www.give-get-go.com in 2016. Klinger launched his new company GGG a film making fun opportunity for all sections of society who want a quick film making opportunity and "Give-Get-Go" a Community Outreach Project to facilitate training, education and fun for all sections of society who want to have film making experiences of every type.

Klinger's novel Under God's Table was published in May 2017.

Tony Klinger was awarded The Lifetime Achievement Award at the Romford Film Festival on 28 May 2018. His film about his late father, The Man Who Got Carter, premiered on 3 November 2018.

During 2019, Tony produced and directed the documentary film Solo2Darwin with Paul Martin, served as executive producer on the feature-length documentary Sisters, and launched Tony Klinger Coaching.

In 2020, Gonzo Publishers published the second editions of The Butterfly Boy and The Who and I (formerly titled Twilight of the Gods).

In 2021, Klinger presented, and co-produced the film, Dirty, Sexy and Totally Iconic, celebrating the 50th anniversary of his father's film Get Carter. He worked with Rob Fairhurst, Wayne Roberts and the team at AR Media in Northampton.

2025 will see his novel, Alsatia- The Search for Treasure, and his reference books How to Get Your Movie Made by Someone Who Knows and "How to Get Into the Movie Business" published.

2025 www.tonyklingeronlinecoaching.com will launch.

Tony Klinger is also a public speaker giving talks, speeches or lectures on a variety of themes.

== Publications ==
2020 The Butterfly Boy (second edition including new material)

2018	"The Who and I"- The second edition with updates of "Twilight of the Gods"
2017	"Under God's Table" – Writer – May 2017
2011	"The Butterfly Boy" – A novel published early 2013; 2013
2009	"Twilight of the Gods" A book about making the film "The Kids are Alright" with The Who rock group. first published in hardback in 2009

=
