= INS Dakar =

Lost Israeli submarine

- INS Dakar in the 1968 configuration

History

Israel
- Name: INS Dakar
- Ordered: 1942, as HMS Totem
- Builder: H.M. Dockyard Devonport
- Laid down: 22 October 1942
- Launched: 29 September 1943
- Acquired: Purchased in 1965
- Commissioned: 10 November 1967
- Identification: Pennant number: 77-צ
- Fate: Sunk on or shortly after 25 January 1968

General characteristics
- Displacement: 1,290 tons surfaced; 1,560 tons submerged
- Length: 276 ft 6 in (84.28 m)
- Beam: 25 ft 6 in (7.77 m)
- Draught: 12 ft 9 in (3.89 m) forward; 14 ft 7 in (4.45 m) aft
- Propulsion: Two shafts; Twin diesel engines 2,500 hp (1.86 MW) each; Twin electric motors 1,450 hp (1.08 MW) each
- Speed: 15.5 knots (28.7 km/h) surfaced; 9 knots (20 km/h) submerged
- Range: 4,500 nmi (8,300 km) at 11 kn (20 km/h) surfaced
- Test depth: 300 ft (91 m) max
- Complement: 61
- Armament: 6 internal forward-facing torpedo tubes; 2 external forward-facing torpedo tubes; 2 external amidships rear-facing torpedo tubes; 1 external rear-facing torpedo tubes; 6 reload torpedoes; QF 4 inch (100 mm) deck gun; 3 anti-aircraft machine guns

INS Dakar (Hebrew: אח"י דקר) was a diesel–electric submarine in the Israeli Navy. The vessel, a modified World War II British T-class submarine, had previously been HMS Totem of the Royal Navy. She was purchased by Israel from the Government of the United Kingdom in 1965 as part of a three T-class submarine deal.

After leaving the UK on her maiden journey as INS Dakar, the submarine and her entire 69-man crew were lost en route to Israel on 25 January 1968. Despite extensive searches over the course of three decades, her wreckage was not found until 1999, when it was located between the islands of Cyprus and Crete at a depth of approximately 3,000 m (9,800 ft). The submarine's conning tower was salvaged and is on display outside the Clandestine Immigration and Naval Museum in Haifa.

The exact cause of Dakar's sinking remains unknown. It was one of four submarine disappearances in 1968; the others were those of the French submarine Minerve, the Soviet submarine K-129, and the U.S. submarine USS Scorpion.

== Early career ==
HMS Totem was built as a group 3 variant of the British T-class submarine; these were constructed during World War II at HM Dockyard Devonport. She was launched on 28 September 1943 and commissioned in early 1945. After the end of World War II, Totem, along with the other surviving group 3 boats, was equipped with submarine snorkels to allow for longer periods of operation underwater. Between 1951 and 1953, Totem was one of eight British Navy submarines to be converted to the "Super T" design, which allowed the vessel to travel at higher and quieter underwater speeds.

== Purchase by Israel ==
In 1965, Totem was purchased by Israel, along with two of her T-class sister boats, Truncheon and Turpin. The former Totem was commissioned into the Israeli Navy at Portsmouth, England on 10 November 1967 as INS Dakar (דקר, English: Swordfish), under the command of Lieutenant-Commander Ya'acov Ra'anan. She then headed to Iceland to conduct sea and dive trials. Late in 1967, Dakar returned to Portsmouth; she left for Israel on 9 January 1968.

Dakar's first port call after leaving the UK was Gibraltar, on the morning of 15 January. She departed at midnight on 16 January with the intention of crossing the Mediterranean Sea on snorkel. The original schedule was for the submarine to enter her new home base at Haifa on 2 February. During her voyage, she was making excellent speed, averaging over 8 kn (15 km/h; 9.2 mph), and Commander Ra'anan radioed Haifa to request entering port ahead of schedule. He was ordered to enter on 29 January. Later, Ra'anan requested to enter a day earlier, on 28 January. This request was denied, as the welcoming ceremony could not be rescheduled.

== Loss ==
At 06:10 on 24 January 1968 Dakar transmitted her position, 34.16°N 26.26°E, just east of Crete. Over the next 18 hours she sent three control transmissions which did not include her position. Her final broadcast was at 00:02 25 January, after which no further transmissions were received.

On 26 January the British Admiralty reported the submarine was missing and gave the last known position as 100 miles (160 km) west of Cyprus. An international search and rescue operation began, including units from Israel, the United States, Greece, Turkey, Britain and Lebanon. Although the Israeli Navy in Haifa began broadcasting calls to commercial vessels to be on the look out for Dakar, Israeli officials would not admit the submarine was missing.

On 27 January, a radio station in Nicosia, Cyprus received a distress call on the frequency of Dakar's emergency buoy, apparently from south-east of Cyprus, but no further traces of the submarine were found. On 31 January, all non-Israeli forces abandoned their search at sunset. Israeli forces continued the search for another four days, ceasing at sundown on 4 February 1968.

Israel denied that Dakar sank as the result of hostile action. It stated that Dakar was involved in crash diving exercises on her return voyage and was probably lost as a result of a mechanical failure. On 25 April 1968, Vice Admiral Avraham Botzer, commander of the Israeli Navy, stated that Dakar sank on 24 January 1968, two days before being reported missing, due to "technical or human malfunctioning" and not "foul play".

== Searches and discovery ==
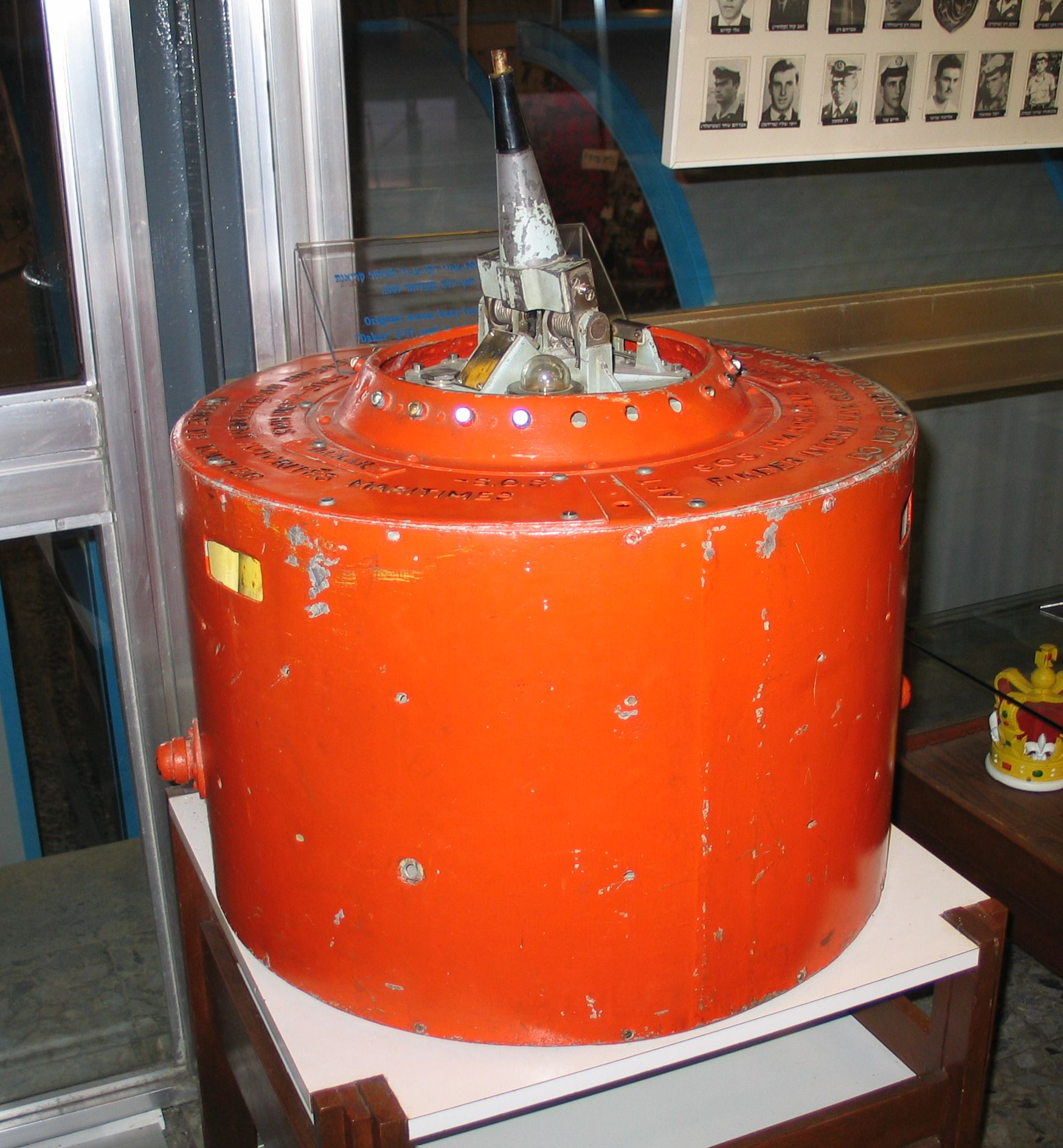
Dakar's emergency buoy in the Clandestine Immigration and Naval Museum in Haifa

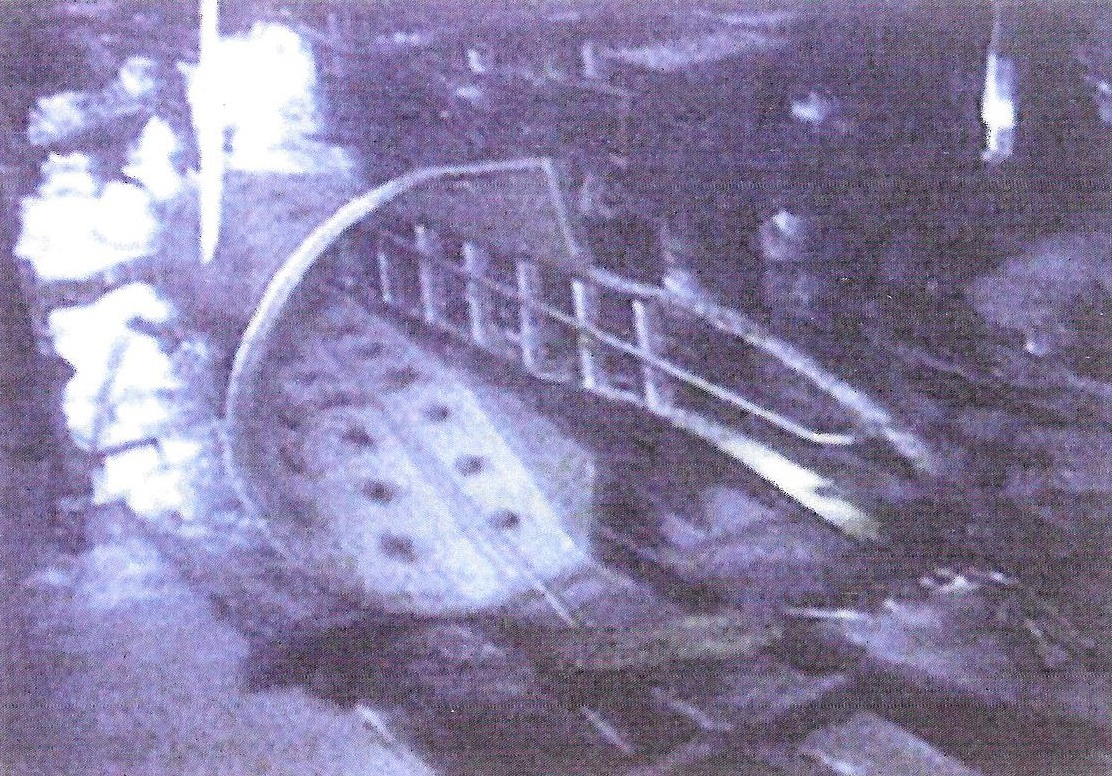
Bridge ladder of the Dakar

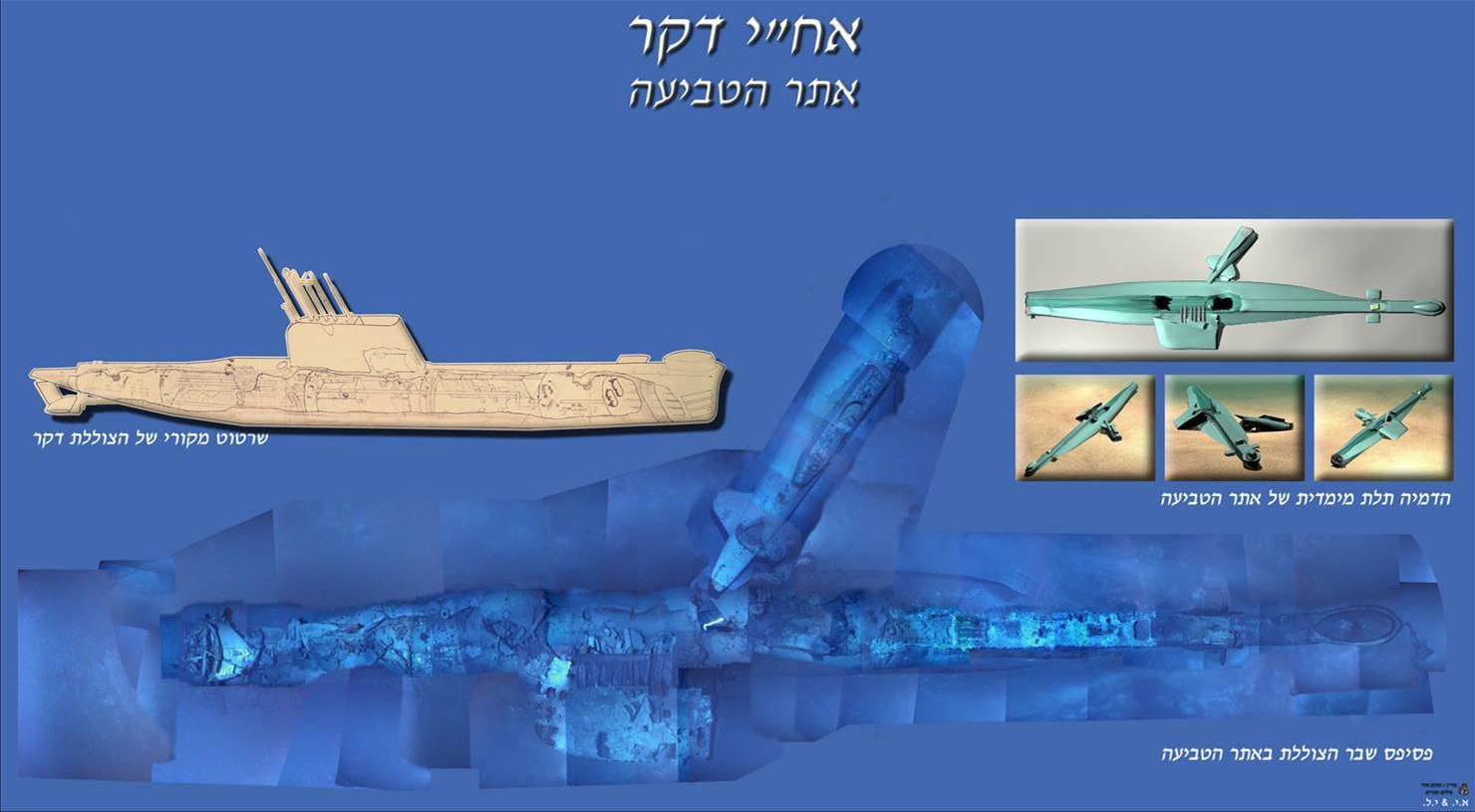
The wreckage of the Dakar

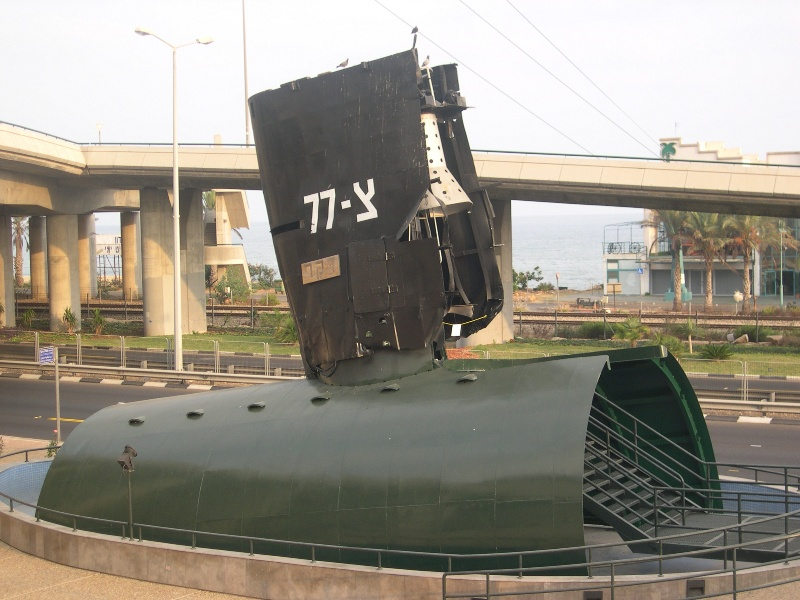
The salvaged conning tower from Dakar outside Haifa's Naval Museum.

On 9 February 1969, more than a year after Dakar went missing, a fisherman found her stern emergency buoy marker washed up on the coast of Khan Yunis, a town southwest of Gaza. British T-class submarines had two such buoy markers, bow and stern, secured behind wooden doors in cages under the deck and attached to the submarine with metal cables 200 meters (660 ft) long.

Experts who examined the 65 cm (26 in) of cable attached to the buoy made several inaccurate determinations. These conclusions – that the buoy had remained attached to the submarine for most of the preceding year until the cable broke, that Dakar rested in depth between 150 and 326 meters (492 and 1,070 ft), and that she was 50–70 nmi (93–130 km) off her planned route – misled searchers for decades. It was not until April 1999, after some 25 failed expeditions, that a search effort was concentrated along the original route.

On 17 January 1970, the Egyptian newspaper Al Akhbar reported that Dakar had been sunk by an Egyptian warship with depth charges. The Egyptian story was told in a 2 July 2005 interview by Asharq Al-Awsat with General Mohamed Azab (a major at that time):

On 23 January 1968, the Egyptian frigate, Assyout, left Alexandria base in a training mission for the naval academy. After completing the training assignment and during the return journey to the base, students noticed the periscope of an alien submarine in Egyptian waters, about two miles (3 km) off Alexandria. The Egyptian commander was informed and the decision was taken to attack the unknown submarine. However, the submarine made a hasty dive and the Egyptian ship lost track of it. General Azab reported the story to his commanders and mentioned that there is a probability that the submarine had crashed into the seabed. However, the story was not believed by the higher Egyptian commanders and there was not sufficient evidence to start a search process. General Azab mentioned that the submarine may have crashed into the seabed due to the shallow depth of water in that region, about 36 meters, while it needed at least 40 meters to dive. It appears that the submarine commander took the risk.

The Israeli government stated there was no evidence to substantiate the Egyptian unofficial claims.

During the 1980s the Israelis, using a salvage vessel with Egyptian liaison officers, conducted three searches for Dakar in waters north of Sinai and another search off the Greek island of Rhodes. In August 1986, the U.S. Navy committed a P-3 Orion and an S-3 Viking to search Egyptian waters near al-Arish. In October 1998, Israel began running advertisements in newspapers in Turkey, Egypt, France, Greece and Russia, offering rewards of up to $300,000 for any information on the fate of Dakar.

On 24 May 1999 a joint U.S.–Israeli search team using information received from U.S. intelligence sources and led by Thomas Kent Dettweiler, a subcontractor from American Nauticos Corporation, detected a large body on the seabed between Crete and Cyprus, at a depth of some 3,000 meters (9,800 ft). On 28 May the first video pictures were taken by the remote-operated vehicle Remora II, making it clear that Dakar had been found. She rests on her keel, bow to the northwest. Her conning tower was snapped off and fallen over the side. The stern of the submarine, with the propellers and dive planes, broke off aft of the engine room and rests beside the main hull.

During October 2000 a survey of the Dakar wreckage and the wreckage site was undertaken by Nauticos corporation and the Israeli Navy. Some artifacts were recovered, including the submarine's bridge, the boat's gyrocompass, and many small items.

The exact cause of the loss remains unknown, but it appears that no emergency measures had been taken before Dakar dived rapidly through her maximum depth, suffered a catastrophic hull rupture, and continued her plunge to the bottom. The emergency buoy was released by the violence of the hull collapse, and drifted for a year before washing ashore.

== Later developments ==
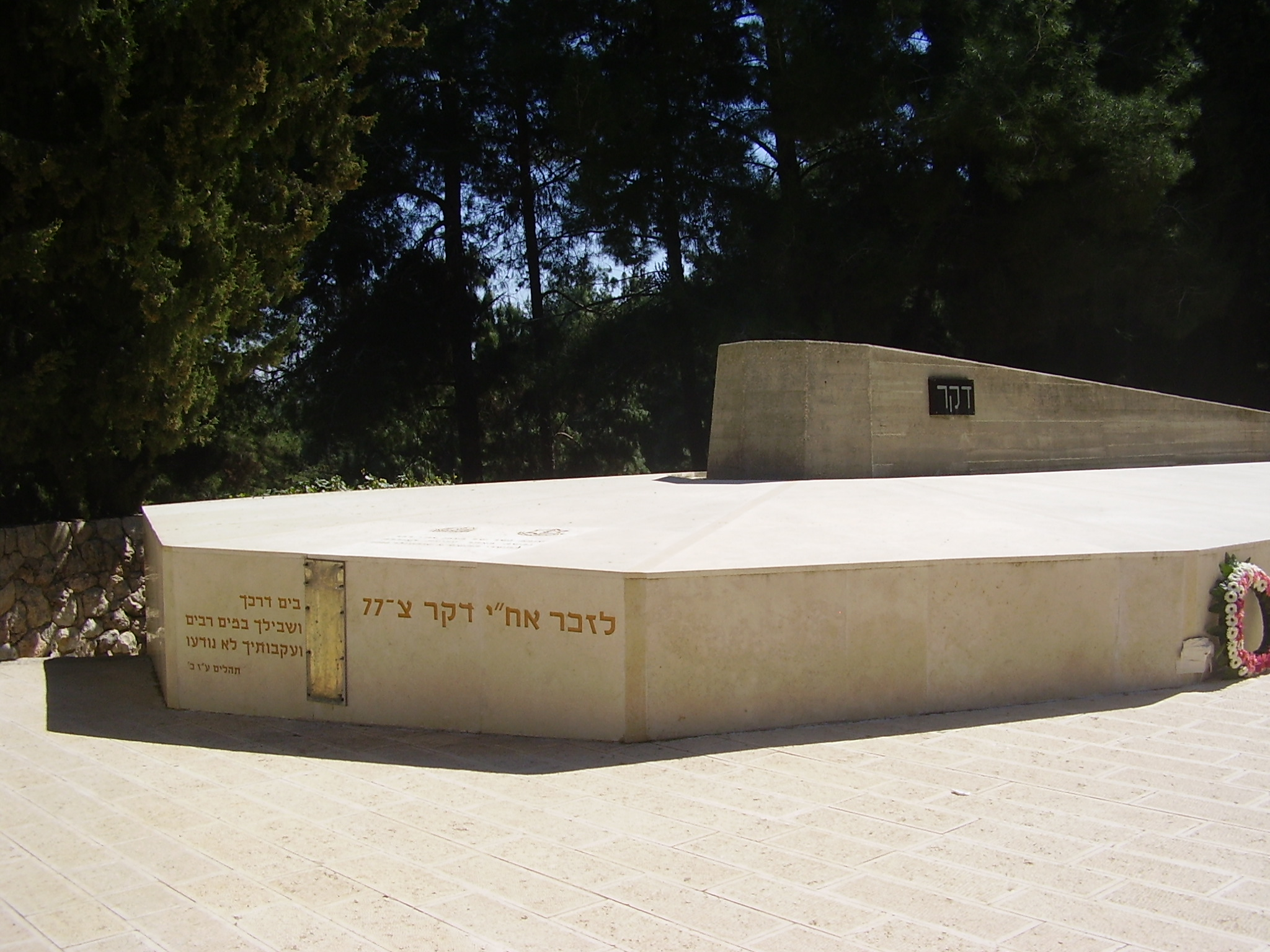
Memorial for INS Dakar

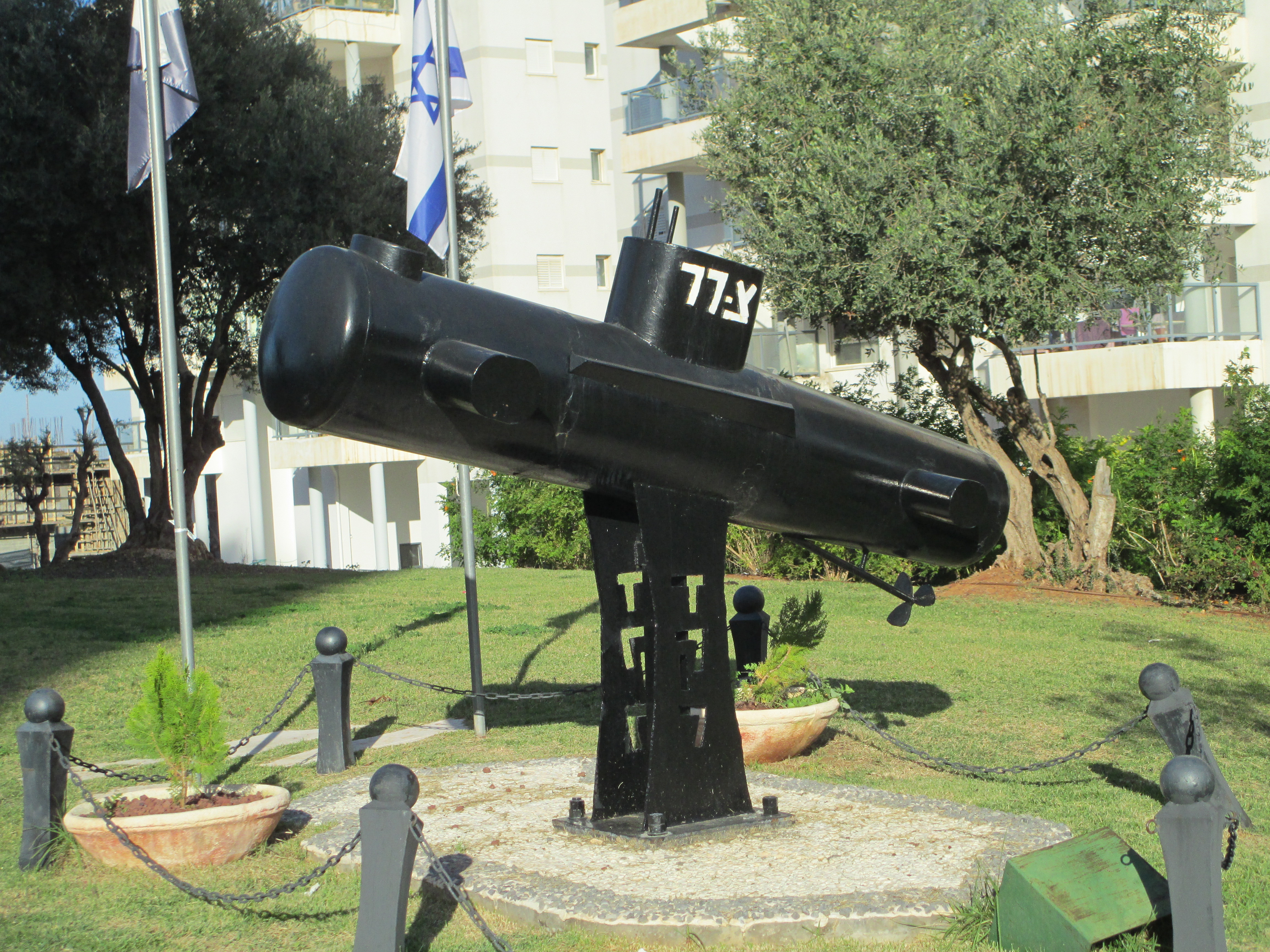
Dakar Park in Giv'at Shmuel

A memorial designed by architect David Brutzkus was dedicated in 1971 at the National Military and Police cemetery in Mount Herzl in Jerusalem. It is inscribed with a Hebrew Bible verse from Psalm 77:19: "Your path led through the sea, your way through the mighty waters, though Your footprints were not seen."

Dakar's bridge and forward edge of her sail are now a memorial display in the Naval Museum in Haifa.

The recovery of any still-existing remains of the crew members has been considered. This would permit their Jewish burial in Israel as Judaism does not recognize burial at sea and requires burial in earth. To date, crew members' families have held a ceremony in a ship over the submarine's remnants. The Rabbinical authorities had to solve complicated problems of Jewish law before the crew members' wives could be declared officially widows, so that they could remarry.

In 2008, a film was released, entitled Full Circle, a documentary about the search for the wreckage. In May 2009, a book was published by Nauticos president David W. Jourdan entitled, Never Forgotten: The Search and Discovery of Israel's Lost Submarine Dakar. This book chronicles the history of the submarine, the story of the families of the 69 lost sailors, and the events leading to the discovery in 1999.

In 2013, on the 45th anniversary of the Dakar's loss, Israel declassified documents revealing that Israeli officials privately feared that the submarine had been sunk by the Soviet Navy. Among the papers included were the records of a 27 January 1968 cabinet meeting in which Israeli Navy commander Shlomo Erell told the ministers that it was unlikely Egypt had sunk the submarine and that "there is the possibility that the sub was downed, without prior intent, by the Soviets. It's possible they thought the sub was going to attack them, but this is just surmise." Weeks later, Erell prepared a paper listing three possible reasons for the loss: technical or human error, military action by the Soviets, or a crash between the submarine and another vessel in the water.

On 1 September 2015 it was reported that the previously classified reports on the loss of Dakar and the subsequent search were released to the families of the submarine's crew.

In 2018 the Navy proposed naming their newest submarine Dakar in tribute to the original vessel. After the families of the Dakar's crew protested, the name was changed to Dragon, which includes the Hebrew letters used in the word Dakar.

== In popular culture ==
- Bright Shark is a novel written by Robert Ballard and Tony Chiu; it describes the discovery of INS Dakar by an American research vessel. Israel and the USSR join forces to preserve the submarine's secret – at the price of direct confrontation with the U.S.
