= Last Concert in Japan =

Live album by Deep Purple
- Released: 16 March 1977 (Japan)
- Recorded: 15 December 1975
- Venues: Nippon Budokan, Tokyo
- Genres: Heavy metal, hard rock
- Length: 43:57
- Label: Warner
- Producers: Deep Purple & Martin Birch

Deep Purple live albums chronology
Made in Europe (1976)	Last Concert in Japan (1977)	Deep Purple in Concert (1980)

Professional ratings
Review scores
Source	Rating
AllMusic	1.5/5 stars

Last Concert in Japan is an album by Deep Purple released in March 1977 in Japan and in June 1978 in Europe. Dedicated to Tommy Bolin, it records the last Japanese concert of the Mark IV-lineup that included Bolin. It was recorded on 15 December 1975 at the Tokyo Budokan and achieved gold certification in Japan. While the original release only included select tracks, the complete show was released in 2001 as This Time Around: Live in Tokyo.

== Background ==
The performance drew 14,000 people, an attendance record for the Budokan Hall. Parts of the concert were also recorded on 16mm film and included in the video Rises Over Japan, released in Japan in 1985.

The recording was substantially edited to fit a single LP. The complete concert was remastered and restored for This Time Around: Live in Tokyo, released in 2001. In addition to including a large portion of the set omitted from the original release, the 2001 re-release restored the show's original sound quality, which was compromised when a hurriedly mastered audio track meant for a potential video release was used to hasten the original release.

The album's original cover incorrectly stated that it included a live version of "Woman from Tokyo", when it included only a short jam on its main riff, performed during Jon Lord's organ solo. This displeased many Deep Purple fans, who assumed the misinformation was done to boost sales.

In a 1995 interview, Glenn Hughes called Last Concert in Japan an "awful record". He said it "should never have been released" because "Tommy couldn't play", as Bolin had taken drugs the night before and fallen asleep on his left arm for eight hours.

== Track listing ==
Side one
No.	Title	Length
1.	"Burn" (Ritchie Blackmore, David Coverdale, Glenn Hughes, Jon Lord, Ian Paice)	7:05
2.	"Love Child" (Tommy Bolin, Coverdale)	4:46
3.	"You Keep On Moving" (Coverdale, Hughes)	6:16
4.	"Wild Dogs" (Bolin, John Tesar)	6:06

Side two
No.	Title	Length
5.	"Lady Luck" (Coverdale, Jeff Cook)	3:11
6.	"Smoke on the Water" (Blackmore, Ian Gillan, Roger Glover, Lord, Paice)	6:24
7.	"Soldier of Fortune" (Blackmore, Coverdale)	2:22
8.	"Woman from Tokyo/Jon Lord Solo" (Blackmore, Gillan, Glover, Lord, Paice)	4:01
9.	"Highway Star" (Blackmore, Gillan, Glover, Lord, Paice)	6:50

Bonus CD tracks
No.	Title	Length
1.	"Gettin' Tighter"
2.	"This Time Around"
3.	"Stormbringer"
4.	"Georgia on My Mind"

== Personnel ==
Deep Purple

- Jon Lord – keyboards, Hammond organ
- Ian Paice – drums, percussion
- David Coverdale – lead vocals
- Glenn Hughes – bass, vocals
- Tommy Bolin – guitars, lead vocals on "Wild Dogs"

Additional Personnel

- Produced by Deep Purple and Martin Birch
- Engineered by Martin Birch
- Assistant engineer: Shigeo Matsumoto

== Charts ==
Chart (1977)	Peak position
Japanese Albums (Oricon)	15

== Certifications ==
Region	Certification	Certified units/sales
Japan (RIAJ) original release	Gold	100,000^{^}
Japan (RIAJ) 1989 release	Gold	100,000^{^}
^{^} Shipments figures based on certification alone.
