= Burn (Deep Purple album) =

Studio album by Deep Purple
- Released: 15 February 1974
- Recorded: November 1973
- Studios: Rolling Stones Mobile Studio, Montreux
- Genres: Hard rock; heavy metal; blues rock
- Length: 41:37
- Labels: Purple; Warner Bros. (US & Canada)
- Producer: Deep Purple

Deep Purple chronology
Who Do We Think We Are (1973)	Burn (1974)	Stormbringer (1974)

Reissued cover
- 30th Anniversary Edition cover

Singles from Burn
- 1. "Might Just Take Your Life" Released: 4 March 1974; 2. "Burn" Released: March 1974 (Japan)

Burn is the eighth studio album by English rock band Deep Purple, released on 15 February 1974, through Purple Records internationally, and Warner Bros. Records in North America. This album was the recording debut of David Coverdale, the band's new vocalist. The group's Mark III line-up for their recording debut included Coverdale, Glenn Hughes (joining from Trapeze) on bass and vocals, Ritchie Blackmore on guitar, Jon Lord on keyboards, and Ian Paice on drums.

Burn mostly consists of hard rock and blues in a similar vein to that of the group's preceding albums, particularly Machine Head, but there was an additional element of funk rock, which would become more prominent in the later albums of the Mark III–IV era. The album has received favourable reviews and accolades but there were mixed reactions shortly after its release. Burn charted in 13 countries, including reaching number three in the UK and number nine in the US. Followed by a successful tour, internal tensions would start to erupt during the recording of their follow-up album, resulting in Blackmore's departure in early 1975. Burn received a reissue in 2004, featuring remastered and remixed versions along with a previously unreleased track.

== Background ==
In the early 1970s, Deep Purple was the best-selling group in the world, particularly in North America. Their 1973 album Who Do We Think We Are was commercially successful, though the tour supporting it was cut short. Tensions between then-lead singer Ian Gillan and guitarist Ritchie Blackmore escalated, resulting in Gillan leaving the group on 29 June 1973 in Osaka, Japan, after their tour had concluded. Gillan described the Who Do We Think We Are recording sessions as elusive, prompting him to announce he was leaving the band. At the time, they were able to dissuade him from quitting. However, in early December 1972, he wrote management a letter declaring that he wanted to leave on 30 June 1973; the decision was made "not impulsive[ly] but [after] at least six months of thought". Gillan also predicted in his letter that the group would eventually disband after his departure. Bassist Roger Glover had also planned to leave the band due to his song ideas being rejected. Eventually, Blackmore decided to stay with the group on the condition that Glover was replaced, as he thought the band had become stagnant. Glover felt this was underserved and hurtful, and decided to quit at the same time as Gillan. His departure was announced the second week of July. Later, he took over as head of A&R at Purple Records and focused mostly on production.

Jon Lord had called the end of Mark II while the band was at their peak: "the biggest shame in rock and roll; God knows what we would have done over the next three or four years. We were writing so well." With Gillan and Glover out of the group, the rest of the members took a five-month hiatus to start searching for a new vocalist. A misleading headlining article came up into the picture about their split, which was confirmed false when Hughes replaced Glover at that time. Blackmore took the lead in instructing the personnel line-up during the search.

=== Hughes and Coverdale introduction: Mark III line-up ===
According to Paice, Glover told him and Lord a few months before his official termination that he wanted to leave the band, so they had started to drop in on Trapeze shows. During their promotional tour in April 1973, Blackmore, Lord, and Paice went on to see Trapeze at the Whisky a Go Go in Los Angeles. There, they complimented then-bassist, Glenn Hughes about his style. Hughes, mistakenly, thought the Deep Purple musicians were expressing their admiration for Trapeze but not for Hughes himself. Hughes was offered the job but declined at first. By the end of the following month, Paice was frustrated at the instability due to Glover's upcoming departure, so he approached Hughes in New York and persuaded Hughes to join the band as vocalist and bassist. He was introduced as a new bassist and vocalist at the same time Gillan and Glover departed.

It was decided that Hughes would sing on the upcoming album. However, Blackmore wanted a vocal soloist in the band with a more masculine voice, and Lord and Paice also agreed to Blackmore's proposal to add more two-part vocal elements to the band's music. Eventually, an agreement was made that Hughes would sing more on later tracks, gradually increasing on following albums (Stormbringer and Come Taste the Band).

However, despite disagreement about Hughes' exact singing role, they considered themselves working as a four-piece group but settled on the idea of having a solo lead singer. They needed a new lead vocalist with a more mature tone, to replace Gillan. Lord affirmed that they had a "golden" opportunity to have two singers in the band. However, as time continued, there was no official word on the replacement, except Paul Rodgers, from Free, who was the only person approached for the job. Although having good relations with the band, Paice affirmed that Rodgers would sometimes turn down offers from "people he respects and admires". At that same time, Rodgers had just formed Bad Company, so he declined the offer. "They did ask", Rodgers recalled, "and I spoke to all of them at length about the possibility. Purple had toured Australia with Free's final lineup. I didn't do it because I was very much into the idea of forming Bad Company." Blackmore was disappointed as he wanted to take the band's music in a blues direction. John Lawton (who would later become the singer of Uriah Heep) was also a candidate but refused, due to a press leak that talked about getting the job offer from the band.

With no upcoming candidates for a lead singer role, the band was desperate to find Gillan's successor. Promotional audition posters for a replacement singer were produced and the band found themselves buried in demo tapes from aspiring singers at the band's management offices in London. Some singers who auditioned included Jess Roden, Graham Bell, Gary Pickford-Hopkins, and Steve Parsons (Snips).

Twenty-one-year-old David Coverdale from Saltburn saw an advert in Melody Maker that said the band was holding auditions for a lead singer, and was considering unknowns. Coverdale, who fronted his band The Government, had opened up for Deep Purple in 1969 at Bradford University after Gillan and Glover had just joined. Coverdale and Lord met together on the road and became good friends but hadn't had any recent contact until Gillan's departure. Coverdale was asked to send a demo and a photo of himself. During the recording of the demo tapes, Coverdale said that he was "very drunk" at that time while singing tunes from Harry Nilsson and Bill Withers ("Everybody's Talkin'" and "Lonely Town, Lonely Street") and Joe Cocker; he later referenced it as the worst demo tape he had recorded. (The demo tape could be heard decades later on the 2023 reissue of Whitesnake's The Purple Album.) For the photo, Coverdale obtained a younger version of himself as a Boy Scout.

Paice received Coverdale's demo tape from the management office and was impressed with his vocal technique and told Lord and Blackmore he found the lead singer the band had envisioned. In mid-August 1973, Coverdale auditioned for the band at Scorpio Sound Studios. He then received a call a week later from Tony Edwards that he was welcomed into the band. On 23 September, a day after his 22nd birthday, the band held a press conference to announce Coverdale's recruitment as the next official lead singer of Deep Purple.

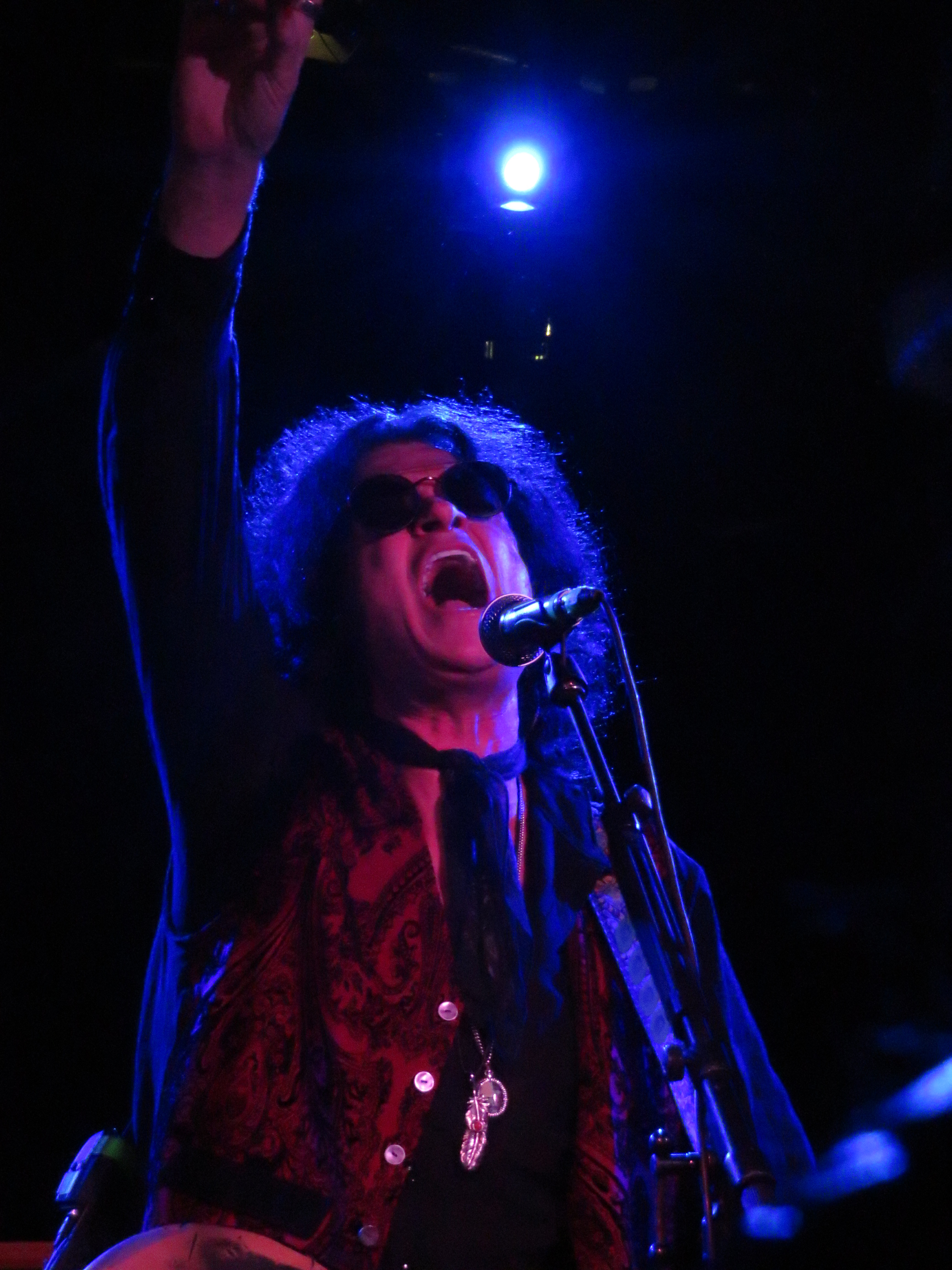
Former Trapeze's Glenn Hughes (performing in 2017) bassist joined the group as Glover's replacement on the same day the departure was announced.

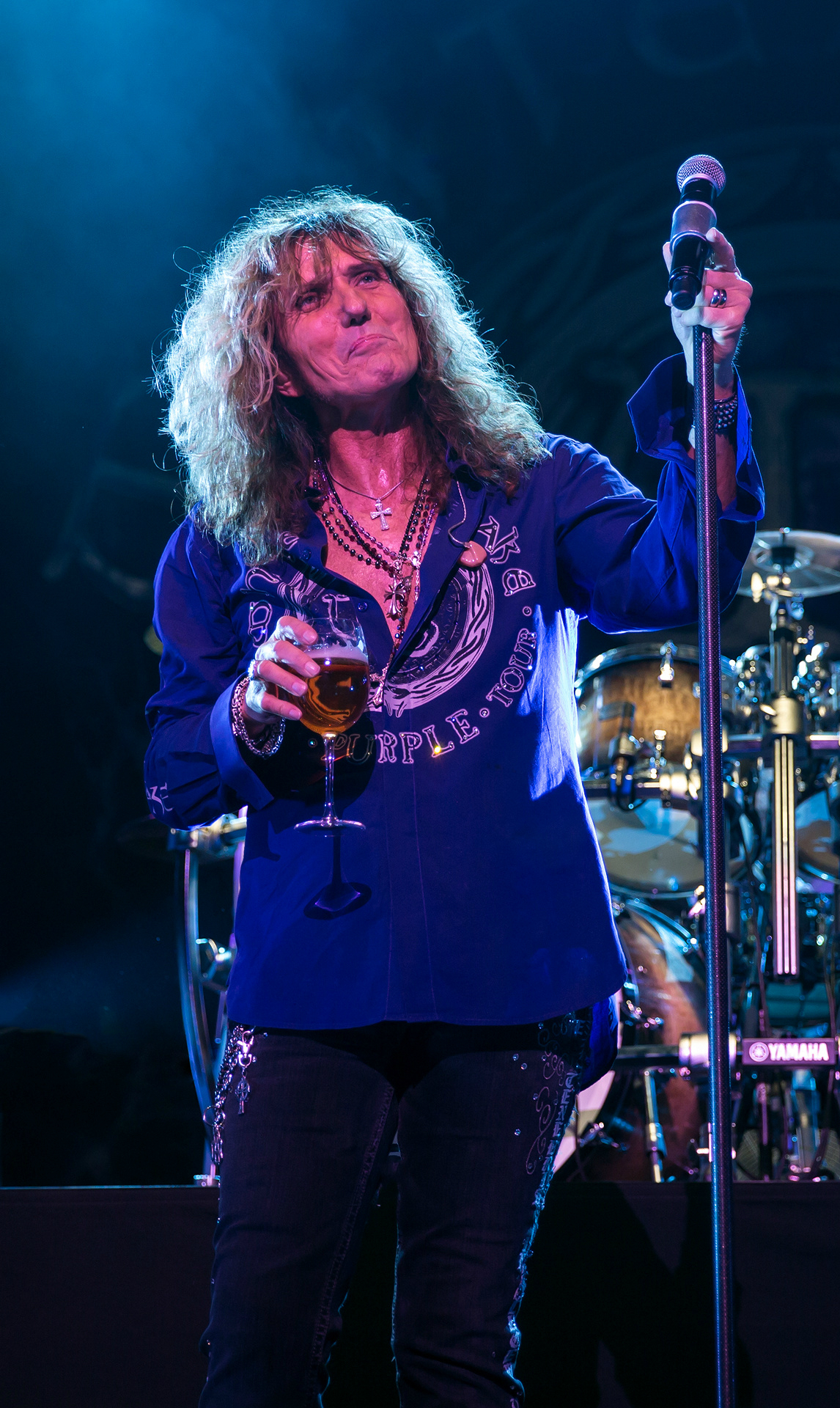
David Coverdale (pictured in 2015 with Whitesnake) joined the band shortly thereafter Hughes' announcement.

Before the new line-up was announced, however, the band's management, John Coletta told Coverdale to correct his strabismus, resulting in him wearing contact lenses instead of glasses. He was then also prescribed a course of amphetamine-based weight-loss drugs that exhausted him while recording sessions of Burn. Coverdale was also asked to shave his mustache and groom his Edgar Broughton hairstyle to a certain length. Lastly, Coletta insisted that Coverdale change his name, but he gently refused. Coverdale told Classic Rock that from his experience, he looked just fine as a rockstar. He referred to Coletta's demands that he change his appearance as Coletta's "paranoid" opinion.

Blackmore was very excited about the new line-up, taking it as a "blues-commercial pop" approach. On the way that he envisioned the 'Mark III' Deep Purple sound, he commented:

"You could say a Beatles-feel with a hard rock backing is the basic thing. We expect a vocalist to take on the part of a lead instrument and that's why we're quite knocked out with matey (Coverdale) there. Who knows? After the LP, I might be saying he's a shitty vocalist as well. I'm not going to say he's the best vocalist in the world but when we heard him, we thought, "Christ he's good". There are now two other guys involved, so it makes it more or less a new band to me. It's not Deep Purple anymore, although it's still the same name. Really, it's a completely different band".

== Production and composition ==
At the beginning of 9 September 1973, the yet-incomplete 'Mark III' line-up commenced two weeks of writing material and rehearsal in Clearwell Castle at Gloucestershire. Blackmore was very satisfied with the rehearsals and found most of the songs playable live. "Smoke On The Water" was also rehearsed as the band's "national anthem", which Lord recalled, found "a new way of doing it". At the end of the two-week period, around half an hour's worth of new music was ready to be recorded. At that same time, Coverdale's introduction was made to the press.

Blackmore and Paice flew to Europe to search for a new recording location for the upcoming album but were unsuccessful. Ultimately, they settled on recording entirely at the Rolling Stones Mobile Studio in Montreux, Switzerland, where the group previously recorded Machine Head.

On 3 November 1973, the Mark III line-up flew to Montreux to commence the official recording. The band worked with producer and engineer Martin Birch, who had worked with the group since the recording of Deep Purple in Rock four years earlier. Burn features performances from Blackmore, Coverdale, Hughes, Paice and Lord. However, this time they were recording on the top floor of the new Convention Centre, giving them the advantage of recording in a soundproof room. Recordings began on 8 November. Despite Coverdale's limited experience in the studio, the recording went on smoothly, laying down the tracks at about one song per day. Five of the multi-track versions of the song "Lay Down, Stay Down", "Sail Away", "Might Just Take Your Life", and "'A' 200" (collectively titled "Racing Cloth") were dated 8 November, then proceeded with two multi-tracks, "Mistreated" and "What's Going On Here", recorded on 12 November, and the final two tracks, "You Fool No One" and "Burn", recorded on 14 November.

The band members agreed that Coverdale was very confident despite the lack of experience in the studio. "We had a good time recording that album," Lord claimed, "David had always been a very self-confident man and if he was overawed to be working with us, it only showed when we were talking between ourselves over a beer later, never during the actual recording." Birch agreed, saying "It was a much happier recording session than Who Do We Think We Are, everybody wanted to get down and work together. David was very nervous because he'd never recorded before."

When the recording for the album concluded, the band flew back to London to have Birch mix the record at Gillan's studio, Kingsway Recorders. Birch made certain Paice's drums levels were normalized, while Blackmore made sure his own guitar was audible in the mix while being aided by assistant engineer Tapani Tapanainen. However, during the mixing of "Mistreated", Coverdale and Hughes recorded a dozen vocal tracks for the final chorus towards the end of the song. In Blackmore's view, the backing vocals overlapped the guitar solo, so the vocal stems were muted throughout the process. Coverdale was upset about the change and felt that the drama created by overlapping vocal tracks had been almost completely lost.

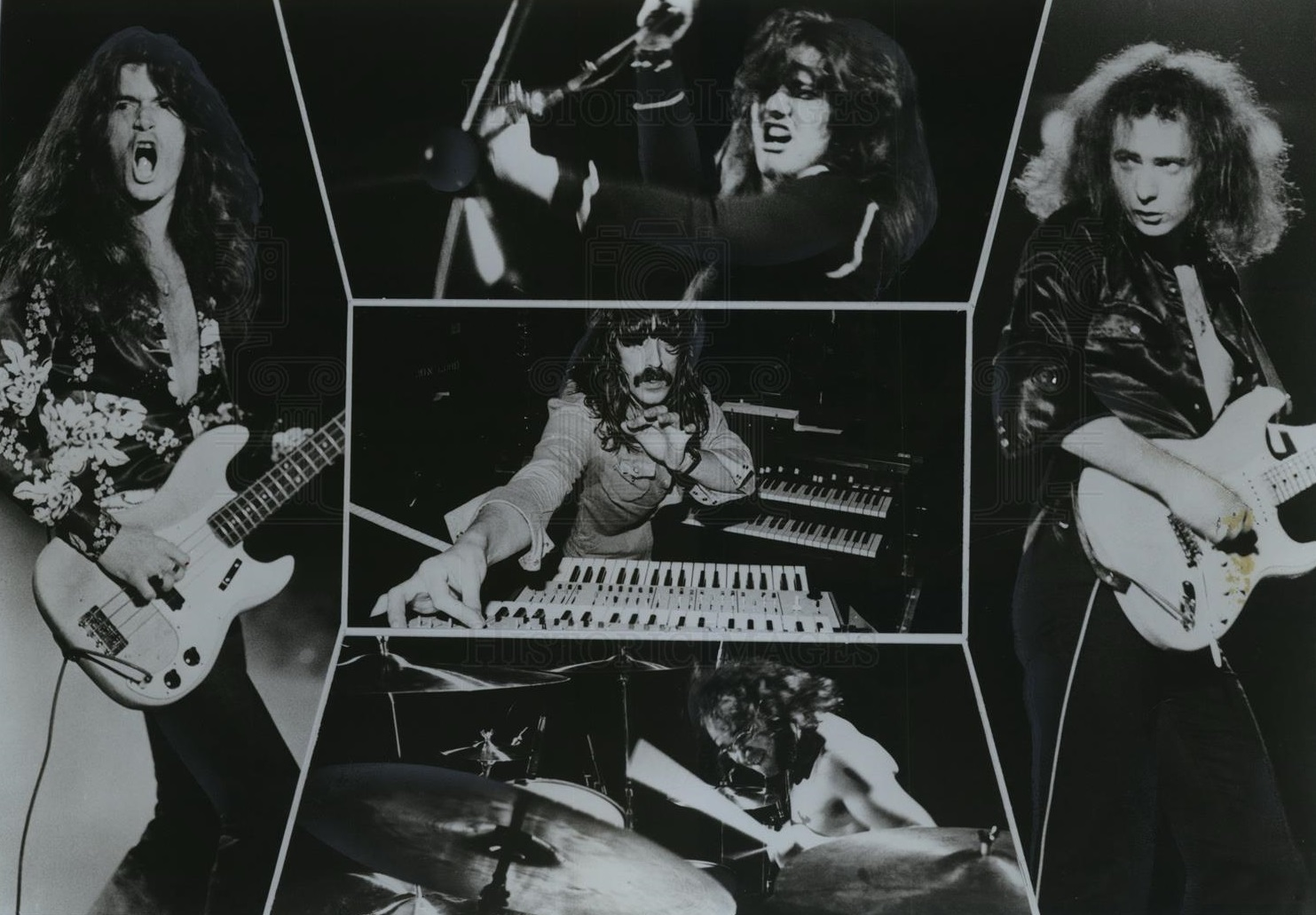
Collage of Deep Purple Mark III in 1974, with Glenn Hughes (left), David Coverdale (top), Jon Lord (middle), Ian Paice (bottom), Ritchie Blackmore (right).

After the album had been mixed and was ready to be mastered, the band started to perform as a warm-up set in Europe. They set out rehearsals in early December 1973 to start doing a six-show setlist their debut originally being planned in Aarhus, Denmark. However, when the plane carrying the group and some of their equipment unknowingly arrived late in Denmark, the Aarhus show was cancelled; around 4,000 were in attendance. Their next gig, at K.B. Hallen arena in Copenhagen on 9 December 1973, marked the actual first Mark III live debut. Coverdale recalled the event, describing it as "nervous" and challenging for the new line-up, given that the band had not toured for six months.

After their first gig concluded, the band celebrated at a local club until 4 in the morning. They were booked to Rosenberg Studios but arrived late as Coverdale stayed back at his hotel room sleeping from the previous night. Lord reportedly led the session to lay out the tracks, while Coverdale prepared a set of lyrics. The sessions got off to a slow start, according to Lord, there was nonsense among with the previous night the band had attended a local club. On the contrary, Coverdale was still exhausted from the other night, so he preferred not to sing on that track except doing chorus lines with Glenn. There, the sessions resulted in a composition that was later named, "Coronarias Redig". The band later left the studio by 6:30 in the evening as it had already been booked for someone else.

At that following day, the group went en-route to Sweden, where they received a gold certification disc from EMI. On that same day, they played at the Scandinavium. After the concert, they returned to Copenhagen to sign records and autographs.

On 13 December 1973, a press conference was held to announce the final shows of the promotional warm-up tour. The latter went on to Brussels (Belgium), Festhalle Frankfurt, Frankfurt (Germany), then concluded with the show on 17 December at Innsbruck (Austria). Later that month, the band toured only five concerts across France and Germany. The second promotional tour was abruptly cut short when Lord was hospitalized with acute appendicitis. He later recovered within three weeks from the surgery he received. The tour was originally planned to begin in the United States in February but was pushed back until March.

=== Music and lyrics ===
Purple's hard-rock sound incorporated elements of soul and funk, which would become much more prominent on the follow-up album, Stormbringer. There was a huge influence of boogie-oriented rock sound which is made in the same way it follows suit with soul and funk. For the first time, it features a more mainstream blues tone approach to their albums since Coverdale's introduction, although Blackmore wanted to give a new sound with different methods of genres. Lord said that the biggest difference between Burn and the previous albums is in the vocal parts, which the band did "in a completely different way". According to Lord, the song sounds much more liberated on the album than before:

”It had been rehearsed and thought about in advance, unlike those albums where we just jammed in the studio until the song was born. Now the only song like that was the instrumental ("'A' 200"), and that was only because I wanted to use a synthesiser.”

In previous albums, all members of the band had been automatically credited as composers. But this approach was changed by Blackmore, who was tired of dividing the royalties into five parts, even when the others had little involvement in the composition. "Everyone should get what they do," Blackmore stated. However, the new practice was followed only in the songs "Sail Away", "Mistreated" (credited to Blackmore and Coverdale) and "'A' 200" (credited to Blackmore, Lord, and Paice). Hughes participated in song-writing but was cheated out of his credits due to unexpired contractual obligations. However, the 30th-anniversary edition of the album credited Hughes in all the tracks except "Sail Away", "Mistreated", "'A' 200" and bonus track "Coronarias Redig".

The opening "Burn" is one of the highlights of the album. Allmusic's Eduardo Rivadavia cites it as one of the band's best opening tracks, along with “Highway Star” from Machine Head. Paice's drumming is strongly featured. The riff is borrowed from George Gershwin's "Fascinating Rhythm", and there are influences from classical music. Lord took the solos on the Hammond organ, closing in with more classical-influenced synthesisers. David Coverdale wrote four different lyrics for the song, as he sometimes had trouble writing lyrics that pleased Blackmore. Blackmore wanted the songs to deal with such topics as demonology and mythology, and to avoid rock clichés such as bands, hotels, and touring life, arguing that no one is interested in listening to plumbers' stories about plumbing or bankers talking about finance. According to Coverdale, during recording in Montreux, he spent all night writing u to six different lyrics, with Blackmore choosing which was used for the recording. Coverdale viewed them as "science fiction" poems.

"As we were discussing the arrangement, I remember that Glenn Hughes was crawling around behind the drum kit. It was a very bizarre situation. Somebody had sent him a package in the mail, and he'd taken the contents without even checking to find out what they were. He kept asking me over and over whether his head was expanding. Ian (Paice) eventually had to take him for a walk in the garden." – Ritchie Blackmore

Paul Stanley of Kiss was inspired by "Burn" to write "I Stole Your Love" (the opening track of Love Gun).

"Might Just Take Your Life" starts as a mid-paced song with a funky blues tone, with an organ chord progression by Lord, inserted as a solo intro. Coverdale explained that the track was influenced by The Band's "Chest Fever" based on a blues-oriented sound. From its lyrical context, according to Coverdale, it was meant for a group of people who have laughed at him and Hughes at their backs when they first thought of joining the group in 1973. The arrangement sets off without a guitar solo, alongside a key change, and a tambourine was added to the percussion mix. Lord finishes it off with the Hammond organ solo arrangement nearly at the end of the track. Blackmore's guitar solo was in the mix but sounded inaudible due to an overlay of the organ solo and other instruments.

"Lay Down, Stay Down", the third track of the album, was the first to be finished in the studio. It has funk and rock and roll influences and prominently features Paice's drums, cowbell and tambourine. At first the song had a slightly different arrangement and its working title was "That's Alright". Coverdale claimed that the composition had the alternate working title of "Shit Fuck Cack Wank"; according to him, "Glenn Hughes and I would wrap our golden tonsils around those swear-words throughout rehearsals until I came up with 'Lay Down, Stay Down' – wherever the fuck that came from. I suppose it was like all those Elvis lyrics, looking for trouble and stuff – that was a cracker." Paice said it his favourite track on the album.

"Sail Away" is written with a funk-bluesier sound that is even compared with Led Zeppelin's "Trampled Under Foot" (released one year later). At first, Coverdale sang the parts so low that he wasn't satisfied with the results, but when the finished song was later listened to in the studio, with Coverdale's re-recorded vocal tracks, it sounded exceptional, getting what he wanted. It was first played on a tape of a cymbal played in reverse, in order to achieve an effect. Blackmore also uses the Synthi Hi-Fli guitar synthesiser in the song to play its "lyrical and haunting fade-out solo" with a slide guitar. Lord also plays the song with the synthesiser which is also replicated to the tone of Stevie Wonder, which the band was originally inspired on that track by its rhythm from Wonder's song, "Superstition".

"You Fool No One" was inspired by Paice's drumming pattern and is the only track on which Coverdale and Hughes sang together. Paice made repeated attempts to create drumming base track in the studio, and became angry with he others, claiming there were unable to keep up, and threatened to walk out. According to Hughes, Paice's pattern was partially inspired by John Bonham of Led Zeppelin.

"What's Goin' On Here" starts off with a 28-bar verse, becoming a 32-bar in the final verse, with Lord playing piano and Blackmore playing slide guitar in the chorus. Coverdale and Hughes again sang mostly equal parts. According to Coverdale, the song was based on Jimi Hendrix's "Highway Chile."

"Mistreated" is a slow-rolling blues, sung by Coverdale alone, and the longest track on the album. According to the 30th-anniversary booklet, the song had been written by Blackmore a few years before and had been considered for the Who Do We Think We Are album, but was shelved until Coverdale wrote lyrics for it.

During the studio recording for "Mistreated", most of the instrumental tracks were recorded from 11 p.m. to 7:30 a.m. When it was time for Coverdale to hear his own vocal parts after the first playback, he found it to be very mediocre which upset him, demanding it to be perfect for the next take. "It was so bad I just sat down and cried because I wanted it to be so good," Coverdale remembered the following night. The next night followed another session and Coverdale took a second try to attempt to get the perfect voice he wanted on the record. Coverdale admitted the pressure he was going through during the recording, although he was very timid at that time. Blackmore’s solo near the end of the song was at first layered heavily by Coverdale and Hughes’ chorus vocals, making it extremely hard to hear the solo. As a result, the stems that aided the vocals were deleted, which again upset Coverdale. Although Coverdale took the chorus vocals as nearly fantastic as it was, he admitted on Blackmore's argument that he can't have too many vocal recordings, otherwise it would disorient the guitar's sound.

"'A' 200" is an instrumental composition that was played to a 'Bolero' rhythm. Originally composed by Lord, Paice, and Blackmore, this was the only instrumental without vocals, with the exception of "Coronarias Redig", to be performed by the 'Mark III' line-up. The multi-tracked synthesisers were all performed by Lord as the lead keyboardist. Blackmore, feeling that he was not required to be on the track chimed in on a guitar solo right before the song ended with the synths works panned across the audio channels. It was not clear where the "'A'" on the track was conceived, but fans speculated it as a work of science fiction, which Coverdale denied. However, a lice treatment shampoo product that had the name "A-200" was conceived by Lord and used as a song title, according to the 30th-anniversary booklet notes.

"Coronarias Redig" was previously issued as the non-album single B-Side of "Burn". Originally recorded on 10 December 1973 at Rosenborg Studios in Copenhagen, soon after their first 'Mark III' line-up touring had ended, it was the only track to be omitted from the album. It follows as another instrumental track incorporating Lord's organ. Coverdale fell asleep in the studio and lost his voice, preventing the addition of any lead vocals; instead Blackmore played a long guitar solo over the melody line. Coverdale and Glenn Hughes sang a few chorus lines. While in the studio, the band was unable to come up with a title, but engineer Freddy Hanssen gave the song the working title "Skidefuld" (drunk), which was later re-worded to "Drunk at the revolution". The song was remixed and featured on the 30th-anniversary edition of the album.

== Release and promotion ==
Burn was released on 15 February 1974 by EMIPurple in Europe and Warner Bros. in North America. It debuted at number seventeen on 2 March, then peaked at number three the following week on their UK native, holding its spot for twenty-three weeks, and by July 1974, it had been certified gold by the BPI for sales of over 100,000 copies in the UK. In the US, the album reached number three on the Billboard 200, marking its appearance for 30 weeks, and was eventually certified gold by the RIAA in 20 March for sales of 500,000 units in the country, later would be certified platinum. Overall, the album charted in 13 countries, cracking the top spot in Austria, Denmark, Germany, and Norway, while receiving gold certification levels in France, Germany, and Sweden.

Some record pressings have the translated album title in some countries; in Argentina, it was named "Quemar", while in Uruguay, it was named "Arde".

Two singles were released, all of which charted. "Might Just Take Your Life" charted at number 95 on the US Billboard Hot 100 singles chart, number 84 in Canada, and number 55 in the UK. "Burn" did not reach the US singles chart but charted at number five on the Bubbling Under Hot 100 chart, and in 1978, charted at number 45 in the UK. In many interviews, the band wanted to put out the appropriate tracks as singles, but in this case, took word from the record label's advice. Coverdale explained that "Sail Away" was originally envisioned to be a single but Warner Bros. said that "Might Just Take Your Life" was more commercial.

== Touring ==
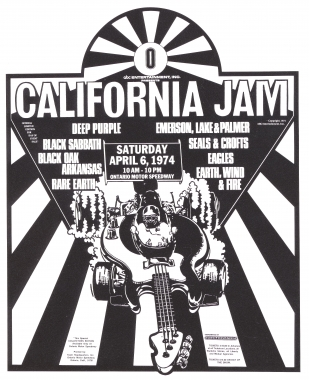
Deep Purple co-headlined the California Jam in 1974. They played to over 300,000 people at the Ontario Motor Speedway in Ontario, Southern California.

Mark III embarked on a US spring tour that started in Detroit on 3 March 1974. Although the tour was sold out in record time, due to the new line-up and playing style, the band at the first concerts received mixed reactions from the audience. Hughes' cocaine usage started to affect his performance throughout the tour. The group later continue on to include shows at Madison Square Garden, New York, on 13 March, and Nassau Coliseum four days later. The band co-headlined (with Emerson, Lake & Palmer) the California Jam festival at Ontario Motor Speedway in Ontario, Southern California, on 6 April 1974. Attracting over 300,000 fans, the festival also included 1970s rock giants Black Sabbath, Eagles and Earth, Wind & Fire. Portions of the show were telecast on ABC Television in the US, exposing the band to a wider audience. During the show, Blackmore struck one of the cameras five times with a guitar and set off a pyrotechnic device in one of his amplifiers, creating a large fireball that was quickly extinguished. The band quickly exited the venue by helicopter, avoiding fire marshals, police officers, and ABC executives. In the end, Deep Purple only had to replace a $5,000 camera ($32,763.49 in 2025). California Jam has even been considered the highlight of Deep Purple's career, as the band has not performed for such a large audience since then. A month later, the band's 22 May performance at the Gaumont State Cinema in Kilburn, London, was recorded and later released in 1982 as Live in London. The tour ended at Coventry on 29 May 1974.

== Cover art ==
The album cover features burning candles that resemble the faces of the band members photographed by Fin Costello. He took the photo quickly, as it was just to give the band an idea of his idea, but unbeknownst to him, it ended up being the album cover. Years later, Costello reshot the cover for Kerrang! for an article in the magazine.

On the back cover, the same candles are extinguished and partially melted, and the band members' faces are in the background. The tracklist and technical data of the disc are also marked on the cover.

The original candles have not been for sale, but another, unused set of candles has been up for auction. At the turn of the millennium, there were copies graded as low quality on the market, which were also advertised on the internet.

== Reception ==
Professional ratings
Review scores
Source	Rating
AllMusic	4.5/5 stars
Blogcritics	(favourable)
Christgau's Record Guide	C+
Rolling Stone	(unfavourable)

In 2004, Burn was remastered and released with bonus tracks. "Coronarias Redig" was recorded during the Burn recording sessions, used only as a B-side for the "Might Just Take Your Life" single in 1974. It appears as a bonus track (in remixed form) on the anniversary edition re-release. The 2004 remix version of "Burn" was later used in Guitar Hero: Warriors of Rock.

In 2005, an unauthorised documentary about the album was produced as part of "The Ultimate Critical Review" series. It featured a brand new interview with Glenn Hughes.

=== Legacy ===
In a retrospective review for AllMusic, Eduardo Rivadavia said:

The phenomenal title track started things off at full throttle, actually challenging the seminal "Highway Star" for the honor of best opener to any Deep Purple album, while showcasing the always impressive drumming of Ian Paice. The fantastic slow-boiling blues of "Mistreated"'s greatness qualifies it for the highest echelons of hard rock achievement, and therefore ranks as an essential item in the discography of any self-respecting music fan.

== Track listings ==
All tracks are written by Ritchie Blackmore, David Coverdale, Jon Lord and Ian Paice (except as noted)^{[†]}; all lead vocals by Coverdale and Glenn Hughes, except "Mistreated" by Coverdale.

Side one
No.	Title	Writer(s)	Length
1.	"Burn"		6:00
2.	"Might Just Take Your Life"		4:36
3.	"Lay Down, Stay Down"		4:15
4.	"Sail Away"	Blackmore, Coverdale	5:48

Side two
No.	Title	Writer(s)	Length
1.	"You Fool No One"		4:47
2.	"What's Goin' On Here"		4:55
3.	"Mistreated"	Blackmore, Coverdale	7:25
4.	"'A' 200"	Blackmore, Lord, Paice	3:51

30th Anniversary Edition bonus tracks
No.	Title	Writer(s)	Length
9.	"Coronarias Redig" (2004 remix)	Blackmore, Lord, Paice	5:30
10.	"Burn" (2004 remix)		6:00
11.	"Mistreated" (2004 remix)	Blackmore, Coverdale	7:28
12.	"You Fool No One" (2004 remix)		4:57
13.	"Sail Away" (2004 remix)	Blackmore, Coverdale	5:37

† All writing was officially written by Blackmore, Coverdale, Lord and Paice, except as noted. Glenn Hughes had participated in most of the songwriting, but was not credited on any tracks in the original 1974 pressing. This was largely made due to unexpired contractual obligations with Ritchie Blackmore, particularly with his publishing contract, which resulted Glenn being cheated out of his songwriting credits. Glenn was credited as a songwriter on the whole album except "Sail Away" and "Mistreated" based from a 2004 reissue. However, on some future pressings since 2004, Glenn's publishing credits were featured in some of the songs but was left out completely. This was made to change recently in a 2018 podcast interview that Hughes settled his dispute in royalties from his songwriting credits with the band.

== Personnel ==
Credits are adapted from the album's liner notes.

Deep Purple

- Ritchie Blackmore – guitar
- David Coverdale – vocals
- Glenn Hughes – bass guitar, vocals
- Jon Lord – keyboards
- Ian Paice – drums

Technical

- Deep Purple – producer, mixing
- Martin Birch – engineer, mixing
- Tapani Tapanainen – assistant engineer

Design

- Nesbit, Phipps and Froome – artwork
- Fin Costello – sleeve photography
- Candle Makers Supplies – candles

Reissue

- Koh Sakai – reissued sleeve notes (Japanese version only)
- Tony Edwards – executive producer
- Matthew Tait – remixing (at Metropolis Studios, London)
- Peter Mew – remastering (at Abbey Road Studios, London)
- Simon Robinson – research, coordination
- Nigel Young – sleeve notes, material
- Jorgen Angel – photography
- Ian Dickson – photography
- Easy On The Eye – artwork remastering, design

== Charts ==
=== Weekly charts ===
Chart (1974)	Peak position
Australian Albums (Kent Music Report)	7
Austrian Albums (Ö3 Austria)	1
Canada Top Albums/CDs (RPM)	7
Danish Albums (Hitlisten)	1
Dutch Albums (Album Top 100)	7
Finnish Albums (The Official Finnish Charts)	5
French Albums (SNEP)	4
German Albums (Offizielle Top 100)	1
Italian Albums (Musica e Dischi)	3
Japanese Albums (Oricon)	11
Norwegian Albums (VG-lista)	1
Spanish Albums (AFYVE)	8
UK Albums (Official Charts)	3
US Billboard 200	9

Chart (2020)	Peak position
UK Rock & Metal Albums (Official Charts)	9

=== Year-end charts ===
Year-end chart performance for Burn
Chart (1974)	Position
Australian Albums (Kent Music Report)	23
German Albums (Offizielle Top 100)	5

== Certifications ==
Region	Certification	Certified units/sales
France (SNEP)	Gold	100,000^{*}
Germany (BVMI)	Gold	150,000
Sweden (GLF)	Gold	50,000^{^}
United Kingdom (BPI)	Gold	100,000^{^}
United States (RIAA)	Gold	500,000^{^}
^{*} Sales figures based on certification alone.^{^} Shipments figures based on certification alone.

== Release history ==
Release formats for Burn
Region	Date	Label	Format	Catalogue	Notes
Europe	15 February 1974	EMI/Purple	LP, Cass, 8-track	TPS-3505	
North America; Japan	15 February 1974	Warner Bros.	LP, Cass, 8-track	W 2766; P-8419W	
Japan	21 December 1987	Warner Bros.	CD	4 988014 360135; 32XD-899	First released on CD formats in Japan.
Europe; United States	1989	Warner Bros.; Purple	CD	CDP 792611 2 (Europe); 0 7599-27283-2 4 (US)	Released on CD formats worldwide.
Europe	24 September 2004	EMI/Purple	CD, LP	7243 4 73621 2 4	30th-anniversary release.
United States; Japan	2005	Rhino; Warner Bros.	CD	0 8122 74641 2 7; WPCR-12019	30th-anniversary release in the US and Japan.
Various	8 April 2016	Universal/Purple; Rhino	Streaming; Digital download		

== Accolades ==
Accolades for Burn
Publication	Country	Accolade	Year	Rank
Classic Rock	United Kingdom	100 Greatest British Rock Albums Ever	2006	27
