= California Jam =

1974 one-day rock music festival

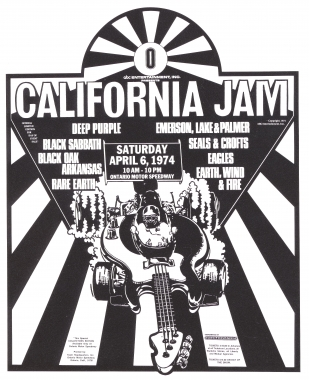
- California Jam 1974
- Genre: Hard rock, progressive rock, heavy metal
- Dates: April 6, 1974
- Locations: Ontario, California, USA
- Founders: ABC Entertainment, Sandy Feldman and Leonard Stogel
- Attendance: 250,000 (tickets sold)

California Jam (also known as Cal Jam) was a rock music festival co-headlined by Deep Purple and Emerson, Lake & Palmer, held at the Ontario Motor Speedway in Ontario, California, on April 6, 1974. It was produced by ABC Entertainment, Sandy Feldman and Leonard Stogel. Pacific Presentations, a Los Angeles–based concert company headed by Sepp Donahower and Gary Perkins, coordinated the event, booked all the musical talent and ran the advertising campaign. Don Branker worked for Leonard Stogel and was responsible for concert site facilitation, toilets, fencing and medical. The California Jam attracted 250,000 paying music fans. The festival set what were then records for the loudest amplification system ever installed, the highest paid attendance, and highest gross in history. It was one of the last of the original wave of rock festivals, as well as one of the most well-executed and financially successful, and presaged the era of media consolidation and the corporatization of the rock music industry.

== Performers ==
In order of appearance

- Rare Earth
- Earth, Wind & Fire
- Eagles, joined by Jackson Browne
- Seals and Crofts
- Black Oak Arkansas
- Black Sabbath
- Deep Purple
- Emerson, Lake & Palmer

The event was MC'd by New York DJ Don Imus.

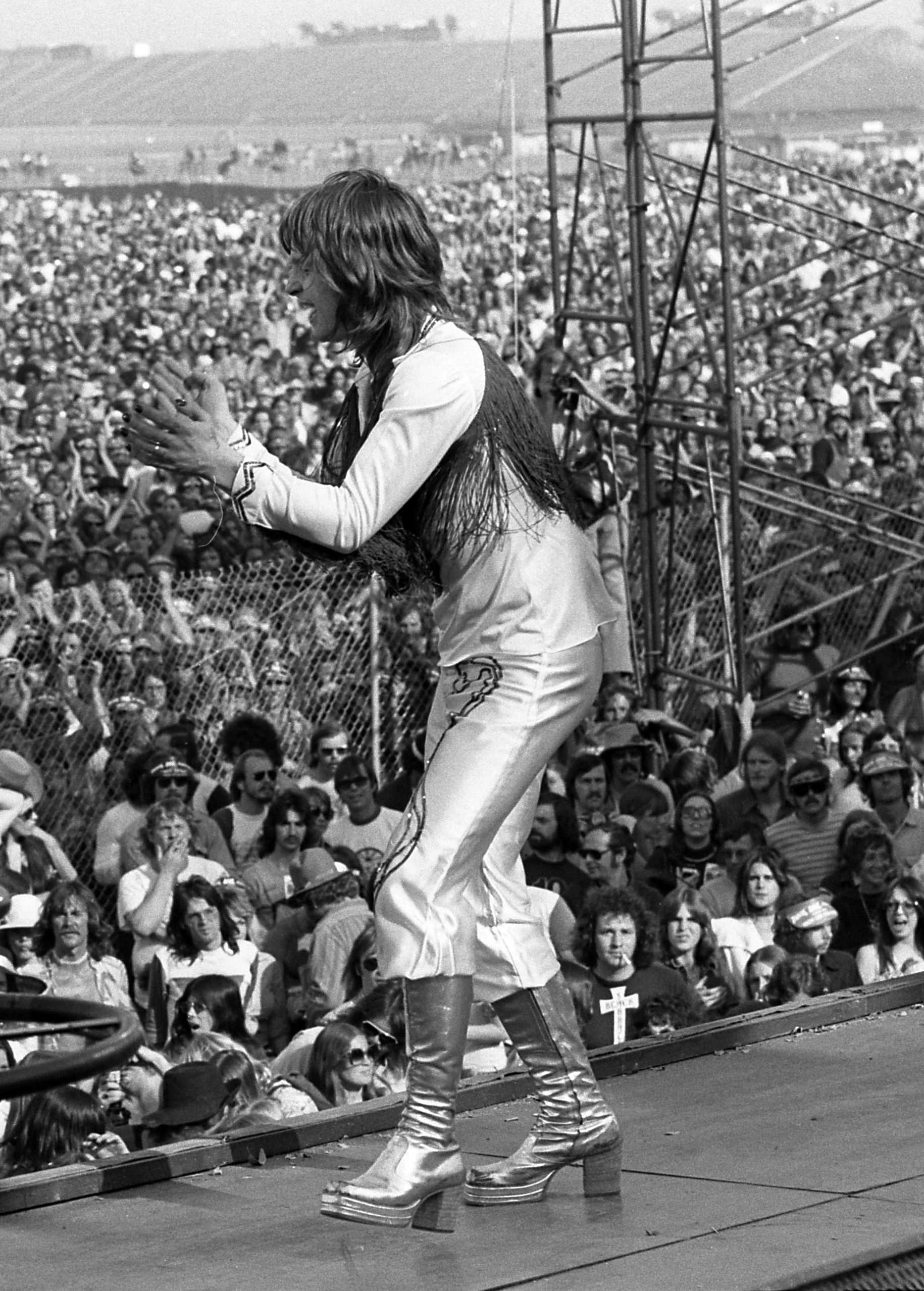
Ozzy Osbourne performing with Black Sabbath at California Jam

Deep Purple's performance was one of the first with their third line-up, which included vocalist David Coverdale and vocalist/bassist Glenn Hughes. Deep Purple was given the choice of when to go on stage, and chose sunset, thus pushing Emerson, Lake & Palmer to the last performance. Having assumed that, as with all festivals, the show would run late, they nonetheless delayed their appearance even when the festival ran ahead of schedule. Angry organizers tried to force Purple onstage, and threatened to cancel their performance. A quick thinking announcer told the crowds that Deep Purple would be on "soon". The band made concertgoers wait nearly an hour until near dusk. Guitarist Ritchie Blackmore said the agreement was always for Purple to go on stage at dusk, and that the promoters were violating that signed agreement. In spite of this delay, the show did not end up running late. At the end of Purple's set, Blackmore threw a guitar and a small speaker monitor into the audience, and suddenly attacked one of the network's video cameras (the camera had been getting between the guitarist and the audience) with a guitar. Later on, a mishap with a pyrotechnic effect caused one of Blackmore's amplifiers to explode, which briefly set the stage on fire. Purple left the concert area by helicopter to avoid a possible confrontation with Ontario fire marshals and ABC-TV executives. The damage to the ABC video camera, estimated to be $10,000, was settled by the band's managers.

The weather on the day of the Cal Jam concert was unusually warm for April. At one point in the late afternoon, thousands of plastic gallon jugs were handed out to the audience, who were able to fill the jugs up at the many drinking fountains set up on the grounds. During the prolonged delay waiting for Deep Purple to hit the stage, restless concert goers began tossing their water jugs in the air. More and more of the audience joined in, until the air above the crowd was filled with hundreds of water jugs flying around, spraying water over the audience.

Deep Purple's performance, along with some of the performances by other bands, was broadcast on TV and radio nationwide in the US. It was at this festival that the footage of Keith Emerson playing a grand piano spinning end-over-end 50 feet above the ground was taken.

For the Eagles' set, Jackson Browne was deputized for absent guitarist Don Felder, whose wife was giving birth to their first child.

Circus reported that Emerson, Lake & Palmer were "angry with the Deep Purple boys, who refused to come onstage until darkness fell. ELP subsequently couldn't begin their set until after one a.m."

== Attendance and technology ==
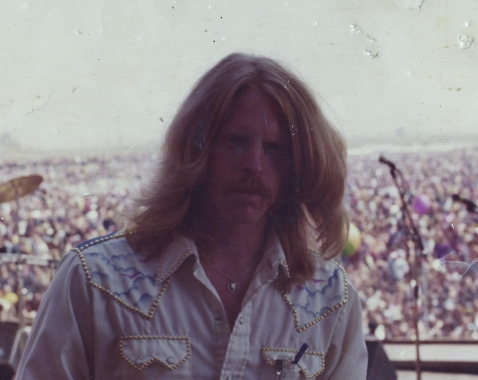
Organizer Don Branker

The concert set a record for the largest paid attendance at such an event. (Although more people attended the festival at Woodstock in New York, only a few thousand had purchased tickets.) Circus reported that there were "more than 175,000 paid admissions" and that "the price was $10 in advance or $15 at the gate".

Another record established at California Jam was for the largest (most powerful) concert sound system ever assembled. This arose from the demands of Deep Purple, who were identified as the "loudest band in the world" by the Guinness Book of World Records. Tycobrahe Sound Company combined the touring systems of Purple, Black Oak Arkansas, Black Sabbath, Earth Wind and Fire, and Rare Earth (each manufactured by Tycobrahe), plus 16 feet (4.9 m) bass horns from Phoenix Sound and a complete array of folded bass horns from Flag Systems. Total power was 54,000 watts RMS, provided by a number of BFA-2000 amplifiers, manufactured by Tycobrahe. Circus commented on "two 50 feet high speaker towers" that transmitted Black Oak Arkansas singer Jim Dandy's "hot and nasty growl to swarms of people spread clear across the speedway".

The Goodyear Blimp hovering overhead was a first for a music festival. Deep Purple arrived in their own chartered jet, the Starship, with the band's name painted on the sides. This was the first time a major band arrived specifically for a music festival in their own aircraft.

Another first was the setting of the stage sets for each band on rails, allowing rapid changeover to the next band, thus eliminating delays and allowing the rock festival to run on time; in fact, ahead of time.

Emerson, Lake and Palmer's touring sound system was set up about half a mile from the stage and timed with a tape delay to coincide with the sound from the stage.

== Broadcast, telecast and record releases ==
Unlike other rock festivals such as Woodstock, the concert was not planned for release as a film or sound recording. However, the ABC television network (which was also a sponsor of the concert) broadcast several portions of the show as part of its In Concert series several months later. The audio portion of the show was also broadcast in stereo on FM radio stations, an early example of simulcasting. KLOS FM (then owned and operated by ABC) promoted and broadcast the concert around Los Angeles.

Deep Purple's California Jam performance was the first full-length music concert recording to be released and sold on video tape in the early 1980s.

Several performances from the show were eventually released on CD and video, both in bootleg and authorized form. One of the more notable bootleg recordings was from a fan who tried to pass off his recordings of a recording from the radio broadcast as something he created. His web site was shut down after he tried selling his unauthorized products without creative approval from the artists involved and the producers of the festival.

Authorized releases include:

- California Jamming, CD of Deep Purple's performance (also released under different titles)
- Live in California 74, DVD of Deep Purple's performance
- Beyond the Beginning, Emerson, Lake & Palmer DVD including 44 minutes of their California Jam performance

== Cultural impact ==
A sequel concert, California Jam II, was held March 18, 1978.

== Book ==
A special limited edition photo book of 1,000 copies (some with band autographs and purple vinyl) was compiled by Simon Robinson and released as Deep Purple at The California Jam and published by Rufus Stone Limited Editions in 2013.

== See also ==
- List of historic rock festivals
- List of jam band music festivals
