= The Mule (song) =

Song by Deep Purple

from the album Fireball
- Released: July 1971
- Recorded: January 1971; Olympic Studios in London
- Genre: Hard rock; progressive rock
- Length: 5:21
- Label: EMI (UK); Warner Bros. Records (US)
- Songwriters: Ritchie Blackmore, Ian Gillan, Roger Glover, Jon Lord, Ian Paice
- Producer: Deep Purple

"The Mule" is a song by English hard rock band Deep Purple, and was originally released on their 1971 album Fireball. The song became famous for its live performance, which would always feature a drum solo by Ian Paice.

Ian Gillan introduces "The Mule" as "It's all about Lucifer and some of his friends, most of whom are sitting around here somewhere tonight." (From the Live in Concert 1972/73 DVD), however on his website he also states "Yes, the Mule was inspired by Asimov." The reference is to the character of The Mule, in the Foundation series by Isaac Asimov, specifically in Foundation and Empire.

== Studio version ==
The song opens with the sound of a tambourine being shaken quickly. This lasts for the first 10 seconds, before guitarist Ritchie Blackmore, bassist Roger Glover, keyboardist Jon Lord, and Paice begin playing the song. The opening guitar riff, resembling a fanfare, lasts for the first minute of the song. Soon, vocalist Ian Gillan begins singing about the "Mule" ("Just another slave for the Mule"). The last 3 1/2 minutes are instrumental, consisting of solos by Blackmore and Lord.

AllMusic writes "The Mule" is perhaps Purple's finest instrumental.

Recording accident

Roger Glover remembers:

In an effort to achieve a phlanging effect the tape had been reversed and was in the "record" mode... Half the drums had been erased from the middle to the end of the song. The drums used for the recording had been packed and were on their way to Europe for the next tour dates. A kit was hastily rented and Ian had to overdub new drums onto half the song.

== Live performances ==
"The Mule" was played by Deep Purple during their 1971, 1972 and 1973 tours, and was recorded live for the Made in Japan album in August 1972. During this live performance, and most others, Paice played a 6-minute drum solo. On the recording heard on Made in Japan, Gillan starts the song by saying:

"Alright...everything up here...please. And a bit more monitor if ya got it."

[guitar noise] "Ah?" [echoing kettle drum] Ritchie Blackmore can faintly be heard saying, "You want everything louder than everything else?" then Gillan saying,

"Yeah, can I have everything louder than everything else...alright...ha ha"

And ends it with:

"Ian Paice on drums! YES!"

The opening guitar riff is repeated at the end of the song. Though the song was never played live between 1973 and 1976, Blackmore played the song's guitar riff after Paice's drum solo, which was moved to "You Fool No One". A snippet of the song appears in an improvisation on the album Live in Europe 1993.

== Personnel ==
- Ian Gillan – vocals
- Ritchie Blackmore – guitar
- Roger Glover – bass
- Jon Lord – organ
- Ian Paice – drums
