= Purple Records =

- Parent company: Universal Music Group
- Founded: 1971
- Founder: John Coletta; Tony Edwards
- Defunct: 1979
- Status: Inactive
- Genre: Hard rock
- Country of origin: United Kingdom

Purple Records was a record label established in 1971 by Deep Purple's management. Their releases were distributed by EMI and now by Universal Music Group after the EMI acquisition. The label was run until 1979. Until 1974 the label was used for Deep Purple releases, band members' solo work and releases by other artists signed to the label. From 1974 a decision was made to release only Deep Purple and members' solo work on the imprint and a subsidiary label, Oyster, was established for other work (including that of ex-band members such as Ian Gillan and Ritchie Blackmore and their new projects, the Ian Gillan Band and Ritchie Blackmore's Rainbow). In 1997 Simon Robinson, from RPM Records, established a second label, releasing rare and previously unissued recordings. Although Universal continues to use the original logo, Robinson designed a new logo for his label.

== 1971–1979 released artists ==
- Deep Purple
- David Coverdale
- Jon Lord
- Roger Glover & Friends
- Tony Ashton
- Hard Stuff
- Rupert Hine
- The Bumbles
- Silverhead
- Jon Pertwee
- Yvonne Elliman
- Carol Hunter
- Michael Des Barres
- Tucky Buzzard
- Curtiss Maldoon
- Gnasher
- Elf
- Marlon

== See also ==
- Lists of record labels
