= Tony Edwards (manager) =

English music manager and music producer

- Born: Maurice Anthony Edwards; 30 June 1932; London
- Died: November 11, 2010 (aged 78); London
- Spouse(s): Judy Moyens (m. 1966), Manuela King (m. 1984)

Tony Edwards (30 June 1932 – 11 November 2010) was an English business entrepreneur and manager of bands including Deep Purple, Toyah Willcox and Johnny Clegg.

== Biography ==
Edwards was born into an affluent family in the clothing industry in 1932, spent his childhood between London and Brighton. His Bar Mitzvah was celebrated at the Royal Pavilion. By the mid-1960s, Edwards found himself disillusioned with the clothing business. Concurrently working for his mother's company, he endeavored to secure a television appearance for Ayshea, a model-turned-singer, on the show Ready Steady Go! In 1966, he formed a connection with the show's producer, Vicki Wickham.

Through Wickham, Edwards encountered Chris Curtis, who left a lasting impression on him. In the subsequent year, Curtis reached out to Edwards, proposing that he take on the role of his manager, with the persuasive argument, "Brian is dead: you can be the next Brian Epstein," thereby suggesting a transition from the clothing industry to music management.

== Deep Purple ==
Edwards, who provided the financial backing for the venture, utilized his personal shareholdings in the family business as collateral to fund the necessary equipment, living expenses, and rent. Despite not fully grasping the musical style being developed, he placed his trust in the artistic vision of the musicians, valuing their expertise over his own initial reactions.

"I financed the concept. All my personal shareholdings in the family business were there as collateral for financing equipment, subsistence, rents. I don't think I was familiar with the sort of music they were creating. I was rather aghast, but I believed in artistic integrity and felt they knew better than I did".

In pursuit of his ambitions, Edwards brought on board John Coletta, a designer with an advertising background, and Ron Hire, to establish HEC Enterprises. This move was instrumental in the formation and launch of the band Roundabout. The group settled in a farmhouse in Hertfordshire, where they developed a sound deeply influenced by Vanilla Fudge, an American band renowned for their elaborate cover songs. Edwards' investment in a demo recording garnered attention from Parlophone and Tetragrammaton. Both labels were eager to promote a British band, leading to significant promotion of Shades of Deep Purple, the debut album of the band, now renamed as Deep Purple.

Ian Paice, the drummer and sole continuous member of the band through its various line-ups, reflected on the early tumultuous days of Deep Purple, recognizing Edwards as a stabilizing presence amidst the frenetic and often volatile music industry.

Edwards remained as the manager of the band until their acrimonious split in 1976.

== Work with other bands ==
The dissolution of Tetragrammaton in 1970 prompted Edwards to secure a deal with Warner Brothers in the United States and to establish Purple Records under the EMI group in 1971. The label achieved success with the release of "The Butterfly Ball and the Grasshopper's Feast" by Roger Glover & Guests in 1974. Another act under Edwards' management, the singer-songwriter duo Curtiss Maldoon, gained prominence when their song "Sepheryn" was reinterpreted by Clive Maldoon's niece, Christine Leach, and William Orbit, eventually becoming the title track of Madonna's 1998 album Ray Of Light.

In 1977, Edwards co-founded Safari Records with John Craig, who had previously been involved with Oyster Records, a label associated with Ritchie Blackmore's Rainbow and the Strawbs. Safari Records made headlines by signing Wayne County, a New York punk scene figure and transsexual artist, along with the British band The Electric Chairs. The group's release, the "Blatantly Offensive EP," soared to the top of the independent music chart.

The label also supported the punk band The Boys and their holiday-themed side project, The Yobs. Matt Dangerfield, the guitarist for The Boys, reminisced about Edwards as a remarkable figure from the classic era of the music business, recalling his distinctive appearance at a Marquee Club performance during the peak of the punk movement, clad in a tweed cape and deerstalker hat, reminiscent of Sherlock Holmes.

Under Edwards' guidance, the artist Toyah Willcox transitioned from an independent music favorite to being named the Best Female Singer at the British Rock & Pop Awards in 1982. Safari Records was known for its diverse and unconventional catalog, which included a punk-country rendition of Kenny Rogers' "Ruby, Don't Take Your Love To Town" performed by Gary Holton, and "Scatterlings of Africa" by Juluka, a South African band notable for its racially integrated lineup, led by Johnny Clegg.

== Death ==
Edwards died on November 11, 2010 at the London Clinic, aged 78. At his funeral, the Deep Purple song, "You Keep On Moving" from Come Taste the Band was played, and Jon Lord represented the band.

Deep Purple guitarist, Ritchie Blackmore wrote about him:

"Tony was the man behind the scenes for Deep Purple. He was instrumental to the existence and sustenance of the band and its music from its inception to present day. Tony’s insight and intuitiveness were unparalleled in the music business. He will be thought of often and missed greatly. Without Tony Edwards there would be no Deep Purple".
