= John Coletta =

English music manager and music producer

John Louis Coletta (4 April 1931 – 9 July 2006) was an English music manager and music producer. He managed Deep Purple, Whitesnake, Rainbow, Praying Mantis and others.

He started his career by taking the Teacher's Diploma in Art at Brighton College of Art, where he specialised in typography, graphics and illustration.

He was an integral part of the management of Deep Purple from 1968 to 1976, often touring with them. After the group split up, he managed David Coverdale's Whitesnake for many years. In later years, he lived in Spain and was involved with concert promotion there until he became ill in 2005.
