= Burn (Deep Purple song) =

- The 1974 US single

Single by Deep Purple

from the album Burn
- B-side: "Might Just Take Your Life" (Japan); "Coronarias Redig" (US)
- Released: March 1974 (Japan); May 1974 (US)
- Recorded: November 1973; Montreux, Switzerland
- Studio: Rolling Stones Mobile Studio
- Genre: Hard rock; Heavy metal
- Length: 6:05 (album version); 4:33 (single edit)
- Label: Warner Bros. (US)
- Songwriters: David Coverdale; Ritchie Blackmore; Jon Lord; Ian Paice
- Producer: Deep Purple

Deep Purple singles chronology
| "Might Just Take Your Life" (1974) | "Burn" (1974) | "You Can't Do It Right" (1974) |

Alternative cover
- Artwork for the Japanese single

"Burn" is a song by English rock band Deep Purple. It was released on the album of the same name in 1974. In the US and Japan it was also released as the second single by the Mark III lineup, after "Might Just Take Your Life".

== History ==
"I came up with the riff on the spur of the moment while we were jamming. Jon (Lord, keyboard player) took a tape home a few days later, and his wife at the time pointed out the similarity to the standard 'Fascinating Rhythm'. Maybe subconsciously I was playing that, but it worked very well… It still sounds great whenever I hear it. But it's funny because there's a mistake right at the end: a big 'klonk' on my guitar. At the time, I'd wanted to overdub it; it sounded like I'd caught my fingers in the strings. But everybody said it sounded natural, so it was left on there." – Ritchie Blackmore

"Burn" served as the band's concert opener for two years, taking over from "Highway Star". It opened Deep Purple's televised set at the California Jam festival two months after its release, on 6 April 1974.

After Purple's 1976 split, Coverdale formed his Whitesnake, which over the years featured Purple members Jon Lord and Ian Paice, and performed Deep songs from the lineups he was part of, Mark III and IV, such as "Burn", "Mistreated", "Might Just Take Your Life" and "Stormbringer".

After the Deep Purple 1984 reunion, the song was no longer played, as Mark II vocalist Ian Gillan would not sing songs from the Mark III and IV eras. The band did perform "Burn" live in 1991, during the time in which Gillan was briefly replaced by Joe Lynn Turner. Purple also played the "Burn" riff during "Speed King" medley in live performances in 1993.

Glenn Hughes has regularly performed "Burn" live, both as a solo artist and with the band Black Country Communion.

In a Billboard interview, Eddie Van Halen named "Burn" one of his all-time favourite guitar riffs.

Ian Paice's drumming on the track, which unusually but seamlessly integrates fills during the verses, has also earned praise from critics and reviewers. Steve Newton (Ear of Newt) states, "'Burn' kicked off with a killer guitar riff and transformed into a six-minute monster of virile vocals and Hammond organ-infused '70s boogie-rock. But the thing that always blew me away most about the song was Paice’s amazingly solid yet swinging drumwork. His phenomenal skinbashing on that track is definitely bless-worthy."

== Song structure ==
Songwriting is credited to Blackmore, Lord, Paice and Coverdale.

Both David Coverdale (all verses & chorus) and Glenn Hughes (chorus & bridge) sing lead vocals on "Burn". Ritchie Blackmore (guitar) and Jon Lord (organ, synthesizer) both have solos in the full-length version of the song. Blackmore's solo follows the first two verses and the bridge, while Lord's is between the second bridge and third verse. Lord uses both the Hammond organ and ARP Odyssey synthesizer in his solo.

== Charts ==
Weekly chart performance for "Burn”
| Chart (1974) | Peak position |
|---|---|
| US Bubbling Under Hot 100 (Billboard) | 5 |

== Personnel ==
- Ritchie Blackmore – guitars
- David Coverdale – vocals
- Glenn Hughes – bass guitar, vocals
- Jon Lord – Hammond organ, ARP Odyssey
- Ian Paice – drums
