= Creation =

Creation or The Creation or Creations, may refer to:

== Arts and entertainment ==
=== Film ===
- Creation (1916 film), possibly the first feature-length animated film in history
- Creation (1922 film), a British silent drama
- Creation (unfinished film), 1931
- Creation (2009 film), about Charles Darwin

=== Literature ===
- Creation (novel), by Gore Vidal, 1981
- The Creation, a 2006 book by E. O. Wilson
- "The Creation", a 1927 poem by James Weldon Johnson in God's Trombones

=== Music ===
- Creation Records, a record label created in 1983
- The Creation (Haydn), a 1798 oratorio by Joseph Haydn
- Creation, a movement by Nathaniel Shilkret in the Genesis Suite, 1945

==== Bands ====
- Creation (American band), a teen musical group
- Creation (Japanese band), formed as Blues Creation
- Creations (band), Australian Christian band
- The Creation (band), an English rock band

==== Albums ====
- Creation (John Coltrane album), 1965
- Creation (Branford Marsalis album), 2001
- Creation (Keith Jarrett album), 2015
- Creation (Archie Roach album), 2013
- Creation (The Pierces album), 2014
- Creation, a 1975 album by Japanese band Creation
- Creation, a 2005 album by Leslie Satcher
- Cre/ation, a volume of The Early Years 1965–1972 by Pink Floyd
- Creation (Seven Lions EP), 2016
- Creation (Yorushika EP), 2021

==== Songs ====
- "Creation" (William Billings), a hymn tune
- The Creation, 1954, an orchestral song by Wolfgang Fortner
- "Creation", a 1994 song by The Creation
- "Creation", a 1976 song by Joe Higgs
- "Creation", a 1965 song by Jonathan King
- "Creation", a song by The Pierces from the 2014 album Creation,
- "Creation", a song by Zion I from the 2000 album Mind Over Matter

=== Other uses in arts and entertainment ===
- Création, a 1940 ballet by Shirō Fukai
- Creation (video game), unreleased
- Creation Books, British book publishing company

== Other uses ==
- Creationism, the religious belief that nature originated with supernatural acts of divine creation
- Creation myth, a symbolic narrative of the origin of the world and how people first came to inhabit it

== See also ==
- Create (disambiguation)
- Creativity (disambiguation)
- Creator (disambiguation)
- Creation of the world (disambiguation)
- Artifact (disambiguation)
- Existence (disambiguation)
- Generate (disambiguation)
- Origin (disambiguation)
- Creatio ex nihilo, the concept that matter was created by a divine being out of nothing
- Creatio ex materia, the notion that the universe was formed out of eternal, pre-existing matter
- Creator deity, responsible for the creation of everything that exists
- Creation Festival, in the United States
- Creation Ministries International, a Christian organization
- Creation Museum, in Kentucky, US
- Creation science
- Creationism (literary movement)
- The Creation of Adam or The Creation of Man, a fresco painting by Michelangelo on the Sistine Chapel ceiling
- Genesis creation narrative, the biblical account of creation
