= Creative =

Creative is an adjective describing people and things that have creativity.

Creative can also refer to:

- "Creative" (song), a 2008 single from Leon Jackson's album Right Now
- Creative director, an occupation
- Creative Labs, a brand owned by Creative Technology
- Creative Technology, a multimedia equipment manufacturer
- Creative mode in a sandbox game, e.g.:
  - Fortnite Creative
  - Minecraft § Creative mode

== See also ==
- Creativity (disambiguation)
- - Creative age, also known as the Imagination age, hypothesized to succeed the Information age
  - Creative agency
  - Creative class, a proposed socioeconomic category
  - Creative Commons, a non-profit organization devoted to expanding the range of creative works available for others to build upon
  - Creative destruction, an economic term
  - Creative industries, economic activities which are concerned with the generation or exploitation of knowledge and information
  - Creative nonfiction, a literary genre
  - Creative writing
