= Akhbar Makkah =

Book on the history of Mecca in the 9th century

Akhbār Makkah
- Author: al-Azraqī
- Original title: Akhbār Makkah wa-mā jāʼa fīhā min al-Āthār
- Language: Arabic
- Genre: History
- Publication place: 9th-century Abbasid Caliphate

Akhbār Makkah wa-mā jāʼa fīhā min al-Āthār (Arabic: أخبار مكة وما جاء فيها من الآثار, romanized: Reports of Mecca and the Monuments which came about it) also simplified to just Akhbār Makkah, is a book written by the 9th-century Muslim scholar Al-Azraqi. The book chronicles the history of the city of Mecca from ancient to more contemporary times.

== Contents ==
Akhbar Makkah describes the history of the city of Mecca, from way back to the times of pre-Islamic Arabia until the Umayyad and early Abbasid periods, as well as a glimpse at life in Mecca in the 9th century. It provides detailed information regarding the construction and history of the Kaaba as well as the Masjid al-Haram and other historical places in the city. Aside from landmarks and various sights in the city, the author also describes the rituals associated with holy places; both pre-Islamic and Islamic rituals.

== Editions ==
The original manuscripts in Arabic is stored in the Leiden University Library. The manuscripts have been published into a modern book, of which there are a few editions:

- A 14th-century reproduction of the manuscript in Arabic that is dated to 13 June 1374 which includes two illustrations of the Kaaba and the Masjid al-Haram under Abbasid rule. It was present in the collection of Sotheby's until it was auctioned off on the 26 April 2024.
- al-Azraqī (1969). Akhbār Makkah wa-mā jāʼa fīhā min al-Āthār. Dār al-Andalus lil-Nashr.
- al-Azraqī (1983). Akhbār Makkah wa-mā jāʼa fīhā min al-Āthār. Dār al-Andalus lil-Nashr.
- al-Azraqī (2004). Akhbār Makkah wa-mā jāʼa fīhā min al-Āthār. Cairo, Egypt: Maktabat al-Thaqāfah al-Dīnīyah. ISBN 9789773411275.
- al-Azraqī (2005). Akhbār Makkah wa-mā jāʼa fīhā min al-Āthār. Jeddah, Saudi Arabia: ‘Abd al-Maqṣūd Muḥammad Sa‘īd Khūjah.

In 1858–1861, a four-volume German translation by the orientalist scholar Ferdinand Wüstenfeld was published in Leipzig.

== See also ==
- Al-Azraqi
- Al-Alam (book)
