= Create =

To create is to make a new person, place, thing, or phenomenon. The term and its variants may also refer to:

- Creativity, phenomenon whereby something new and valuable is created
- Character development in acting

== Art, entertainment, and media ==
- "Create" (song), 2021 single by Gen Hoshino
- Create (TV network), an American public television network consisting of lifestyle and human interest programming from the libraries of PBS and American Public Television
- Create (video game), a 2010 video game published by EA

== Brands and enterprises ==
- Create (nightclub), an entertainment venue in Los Angeles

== Computing and technology ==
- Chicago Region Environmental and Transportation Efficiency Program, a proposed improvement to the rail lines in the Chicago area
- Create, read, update and delete, create is one of the four basic functions of persistent storage identified in the acronym CRUD
  - CREATE (SQL), a statement in SQL
- iRobot Create, a hobbyist robot based on the iRobot Roomba platform

== Organizations and programs ==
- Create Project, a web-based community focused on communication and sharing between Free and Open Source Creative applications
- Create (charity), a UK creative arts charity
- Create Lithuania, native name Kurk Lietuvai, a Lithuanian government agency.

== Transportation ==
- Chicago Region Environmental and Transportation Efficiency Program, a series of projects to improve rail lines in the Chicago area

== See also ==
- Creation (disambiguation)
