= Zurah =

Pilgrimage site in Islamic cosmology

In Islamic cosmology, Zurah, also known as Bait al-Makmur (Arabic: البيت المعمور, romanized: Al-Baytul Ma'mur) is a pilgrimage site that was originally built by Adam. It was lifted into the fourth level of Jannah during the time of Noah when the Flood occurred. It was the precursor to the Kaaba.
