= Creator =

Creator or The Creator may refer to:

== Film and television ==
- Creator (film), a 1985 film starring Peter O'Toole, Vincent Spano, Mariel Hemingway, and Virginia Madsen
- The Creator (1999 film), a French film written and directed by and starring Albert Dupontel
- The Creator (2023 film), an American science fiction film directed by Gareth Edwards
- The Creators (film), a 2012 South African documentary film
- "The Creator" (Luke Cage), an episode of Luke Cage

== Literature ==
- Creators (comics), fictional sorcerers in Marvel Comics
- Creators (Guyver), characters in the manga Bio Booster Armor Guyver
- "The Creator" (novelette), a 1935 sci-fi short story by Clifford D. Simak
- The Creator (poetry collection), a 2000 compilation by Dejan Stojanović
- The Creators (book), a 1992 history book by Daniel Boorstin
- The Creator (Sword of Truth), in Terry Goodkind's fantasy novel series

== Music ==
- Creator (album), a 1988 album by The Lemonheads
- "Creator", a 2018 song by Front Line Assembly from WarMech
- "The Creator", a 1991 song by Pete Rock & C.L. Smooth
- "Creator" (song), a 2008 song by Santigold

== Religion ==
- Creator deity, a deity responsible for the creation of the Earth, world, and universe
- Great Spirit, or similar deity in Native American religions is often known as "The Creator"
- Fatir or The Creator, 35th Sura of the Qur'an
- Creator, an adherent of Creativity

== Other uses ==
- Tyler, the Creator (born 1991), American rapper
- Creator Classic, golf tournament
- Content creator, of media content
  - Television show creator, the person who developed a significant part
- Creator (horse), a racehorse

== See also ==
- Kreator, a German thrash metal band
- Creation (disambiguation)
