= Kaaba =

Building at the center of Masjid al-Haram

The Kaaba
- الكعبة
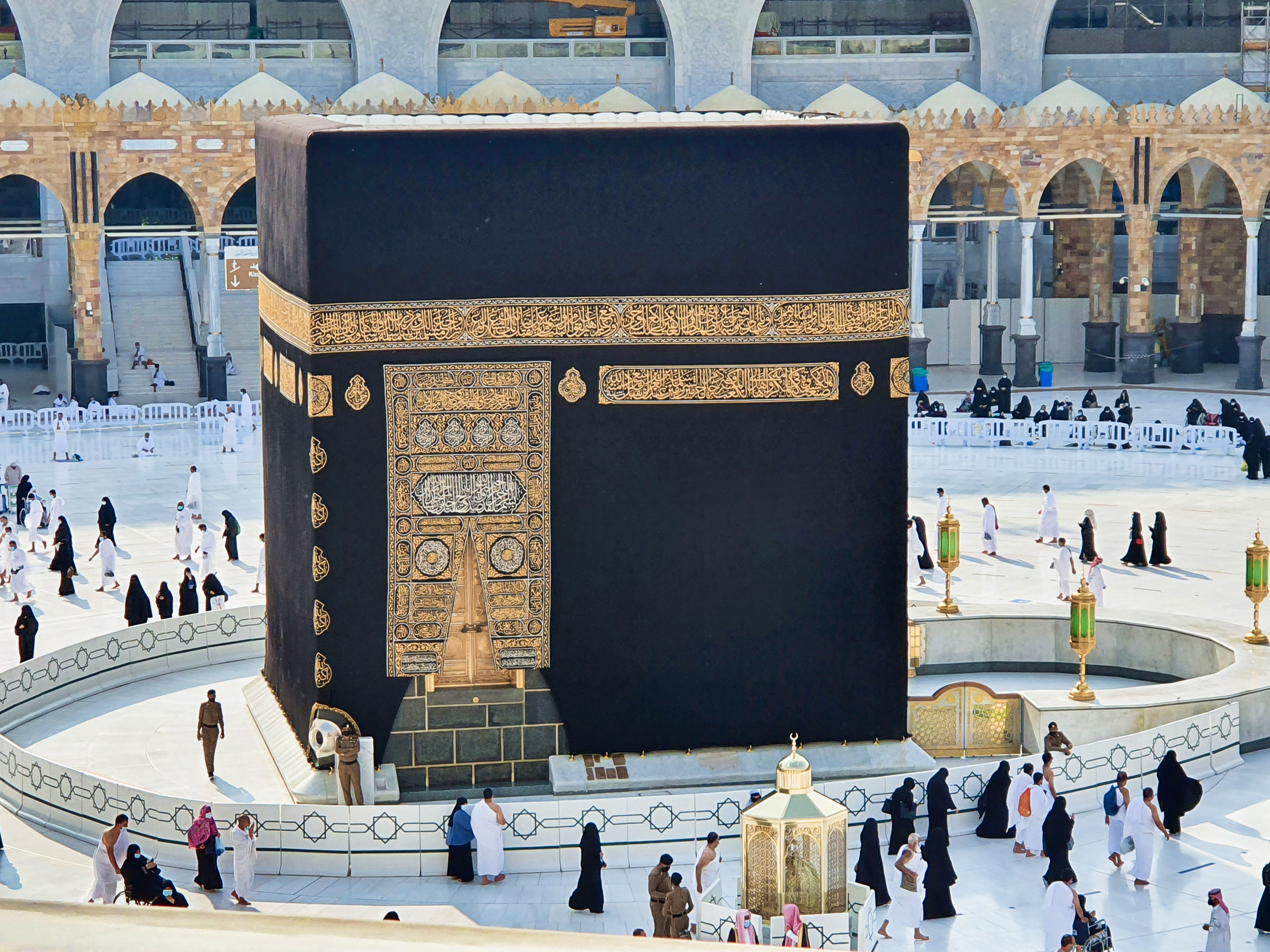

- Location of the Kaaba in Saudi Arabia

Religion
- Affiliation: Islam
- Rite: Tawaf
- Ecclesiastical or organisational status: Mosque
- Leadership: Abdul-Rahman Al-Sudais: (President of the Affairs of the Two Holy Mosques)
- Status: Active

Location
- Location: Great Mosque of Mecca, Mecca, Mecca Province, Hejaz
- Country: Saudi Arabia
- Interactive map of area around the Kaaba
- Administration: The Agency of the General Presidency for the Affairs of the Two Holy Mosques
- Coordinates: 21°25′21″N 39°49′34″E

Architecture
- Type: Temple
- Established: Pre-Islamic era

Specifications
- Length: 12.86 m (42 ft 2 in)
- Width: 11.03 m (36 ft 2 in)
- Height (max): 13.1 m (43 ft 0 in)
- Materials: Stone; marble; limestone

The Kaaba (Arabic: الكعبة, romanized: al-Kaʿba, lit. 'the Cube'), (Note: ALA-LC: al-Kaʽbah; DMG: al-Kaʽba; Wehr: al-kaʽba Arabic pronunciation: [alˈkaʕba]) also spelled Kaʽba, Kaʽbah or Kabah, sometimes referred to as al-Kaʽba al-Musharrafa (Arabic: الكعبة المشرفة, lit. 'the Honored Ka'ba'), (Note: ALA-LC: al-Kaʻbah al-Musharrafah; DMG: al-Kaʿba al-Mušarrafa; Wehr: al-kaʿba al-mušarrafa Arabic pronunciation: [alˈkaʕba‿lmuˈʃarrafa]) is a stone building at the center of Islam's most important mosque and holiest site, the Masjid al-Haram in Mecca, Saudi Arabia. It is considered by Muslims to be the Baytullah (Arabic: بيت اللَّٰه, lit. 'House of God') and determines the qibla (Arabic: قبلة, lit. 'direction of prayer') for Muslims around the world.

According to Islamic tradition, the Kaaba was rebuilt several times throughout history, most famously by Ibrahim and his son Ismail, when he returned to the valley of Mecca several years after leaving his wife Hajar and Ismail there upon Allah's command. The current structure was built after the original building was damaged by a fire during the siege of Mecca by the Umayyads in 683 CE. Circling the Kaaba seven times anti-clockwise, known as tawaf (Arabic: طواف, romanized: ṭawaaf), is a fard rite for the completion of the hajj and umrah pilgrimages. The area around the Kaaba where pilgrims walk is called the mataaf.

In early Islam, Muslims faced in the general direction of Al-Aqsa Mosque in Jerusalem as the qibla in their prayers before changing the direction to face the Kaaba, believed by Muslims to be a result of a Quranic verse revelation to Muhammad. The Kaaba and the mataaf are surrounded by pilgrims every day of the Islamic year, except the 9th of Dhu'l-Hijja, known as the Day of Arafah, on which the cloth covering the structure, known as the Kiswah (Arabic: كسوة, romanized: kiswa, lit. 'Cloth'), is changed. However, the most significant increase in their numbers is during Ramadan and the hajj, when millions of pilgrims gather for tawaf. According to the Saudi Ministry of Hajj and Umrah, 6,791,100 external pilgrims arrived for the Umrah pilgrimage in 1439 AH (2017/2018 CE).

== Etymology and pre-Islamic usage ==
In Arabic, the literal meaning of the word Ka'ba (Arabic: كعبة) is cube. Therefore, the most popular etymology has been that the Kaaba was named after its kaʿb form. Some have questioned that the cubic sense of kaʿb is pre-Islamic, seeking etymologies elsewhere. One disputed hypothesis suggests that the name "Kaaba" is related to the southern Arabian or Ethiopian word "mikrab", signifying a temple. Another relates it to Kʿbt, which is related to the Kaaba of Najran. (See for a word with similar pronunciation: Qubba)

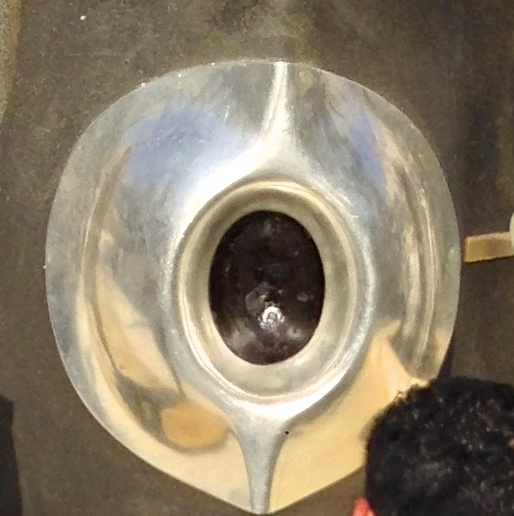
The Black Stone is seen through a portal in the Kaaba.

In the pre-Islamic religions of Arabia -spanning from the Levant to Yemen, numerous deities —such as, Al-Lat, Dhu al-Khalasa, and al-Uzza (also occasionally referred to as Chaabou), Dushara, Dhu Samawi etc.— were represented by aniconic cubic stone carvings or by cubic structures regarded as the abodes of these deities; furthermore, the existence of "sacred/haram zones" surrounding these sanctuaries and the widespread use of the name "Ka'b" to denote such sanctity, is well-established. They are primarily known from the Arabian Peninsula, with some exception such as Kaaba of Zoroaster. The Black Stone of the Kaaba has been compared to pre-Islamic religious stones called baetyls, which were often black, thought to be of meteorite origins, and venerated in houses or temples of worship for a particular deity. There was a "Red Stone", in the Kaaba of the South Arabian city of Ghaiman; and the "White Stone" in the Kaaba of al-Abalat (near modern-day Tabalah). Grunebaum, in Classical Islam, points out that the experience of divinity of that period was often associated with the fetishism of stones, mountains, special rock formations, or "trees of strange growth."

Although the cultural heritage of the pagan era was largely eradicated during Islam's struggle to establish Islamic monotheism, historical research has uncovered traces of some sanctuaries that were significant enough to rival the Kaaba in Mecca; nevertheless, the belief that there has always been only one Kaaba has become deeply ingrained in Muslim literary and religious tradition. Today, the Kaaba and the Masjid al-Haram in Mecca are identified as the direction of prayer; however, an archaeological document found in the Taif region suggests that this view is anachronistic from the perspective of traditional Islamic historiography, as a stone inscription discovered there dates the construction of the Masjid al-Haram to the year 78 AH. Furthermore, a Quranic verse recounting Muhammad's night journey —an event often presented today as a miracle— to the Masjid al-Aqsa offers clues suggesting that the *Masjid al-Haram* mentioned in the Quran might differ from the one located in Mecca. Surah Al-Isra 17:1:

Glory be to the One Who took His servant by night from Masjid al-Haram to the Masjid al-Aqsa whose surroundings We have blessed, so that We may show him some of Our signs. Indeed, He alone is the All-Hearing, All-Seeing

== History ==
=== Mythologies ===
According to mythological accounts, prior to the creation of the earth, the Divine Throne, Arsh rested upon the waters. Allah sent forth a wind to create a dome at the site of the Kaaba; the earth was created beneath this dome, and stabilized with mountains. Mount Abu Qubays was the first mountain placed upon the earth, and the other mountains spread across the earth from Abu Qubays. Another tradition holds that a thousand years before the creation of the earth, the Kaaba was a white essence resting upon the waters, supported by two angels who were glorifying Allah. The earth was spread out and expanded beneath this essence, and the Kaaba was established as the center of the earth.

A comparative analysis of these narratives reveals that many myths associated with the Kaaba—such as the primordial ocean, the axis mundi, and the omphalos—are motifs shared with other cultures, and it can uncover their possible origins in older cultures.

=== Before Muhammad ===
In pre-Islamic Arabic poetry attributed to Zuhayr ibn Abi Sulma, the builders of the Kaaba are said to be the Quraysh and Jurhum tribes. Christian J. Robin argues that the Kaaba may have become prominent in the last decades of the 6th century in the aftermath of the military defeat of Abraha by the Quraysh. However, Peter Webb, based on pre-Islamic poetry, argues that the Kaaba was never a prominent site of pilgrimage and that it largely played a local role in Western Arabia as opposed to a pan-Arabian one.

In Islamic cosmology, the Zurah pilgrimage site was the precursor to the Kaaba. According to Islamic tradition, the pre-Islamic Kaaba was a site of worship for various Arabian Bedouin tribes, who would make pilgrimage once every lunar year, setting aside their tribal feuds. The Kaaba hosted 360 pagan idols (potentially one representing each day of the year) including sculptures and paintings before Islam, notably including a statue of Hubal, the principal idol of Mecca, paintings of angels, of Ibrahim holding divination arrows, and of Isa (Jesus) and his mother Maryam (Mary), which Muhammad spared. Undefined decorations, money and a pair of ram's horns were recorded to be inside the Kaaba. The pair of ram's horns were said to have belonged to the ram sacrificed by Ibrahim in place of his son Ismail as held by Islamic tradition. Islamic tradition traces the polytheism of the Kaaba to the descendants of Ishmael who settled around the Zamzam Well and gradually turned it away from its original monotheist practice during the time of Abraham. The Book of Idols by Hisham ibn al-Kalbi describes the origins of idolatry at the Kaaba: about 400 years before the birth of Muhammad, a man named 'Amr ibn Luhay, who descended from Qahtan and was the king of Hijaz, placed an idol of Hubal on the roof of the Kaaba. This idol was one of the chief deities of the ruling Quraysh tribe. The idol was made of red agate and shaped like a human, but with the right hand broken off and replaced with a golden hand. When the idol was moved inside the Kaaba, it had seven arrows in front of it, which were used for divination. To maintain peace among the perpetually warring tribes, Mecca was declared a sanctuary where no violence was allowed within 30 km (20 mi) of the Kaaba. This combat-free zone allowed Mecca to thrive not only as a place of pilgrimage, but also as a trading center. A king named Tubba' is considered the first one to have a door be built for the Kaaba according to sayings recorded in Al-Azraqi's Akhbar Makka.

Alfred Guillaume, in his translation of the Ibn Ishaq's seerah, says that the Kaaba itself might be referred to in the feminine form. Circumambulation was often performed naked by men and almost naked by women. It is disputed whether Allah and Hubal were the same deity or different. According to a hypothesis by Uri Rubin and Christian Robin, Hubal was only venerated by Quraysh and the Kaaba was first dedicated to Allah, a supreme god of individuals belonging to different tribes, while the pantheon of the gods of Quraysh was installed in the Kaaba after they conquered Mecca a century before Muhammad's time.

==== Ptolemy and Diodorus Siculus ====
Writing in the Encyclopedia of Islam, Wensinck identifies Mecca with a place called Macoraba mentioned by Ptolemy. G. E. von Grunebaum states: "Mecca is mentioned by Ptolemy. The name he gives it allows us to identify it as a South Arabian foundation created around a sanctuary." In Meccan Trade and the Rise of Islam, Patricia Crone argues that the identification of Macoraba with Mecca is false and that Macoraba was a town in southern Arabia in what was then known as Arabia Felix. A 2018 study revisited the arguments for Macoraba and found them unsatisfactory.

Based on an earlier report by Agatharchides of Cnidus, Diodorus Siculus mentions a temple along the Red Sea coast, "which is very holy and exceedingly revered by all Arabians". Edward Gibbon believed that this was the Kaaba. However, Ian D. Morris argues that Gibbon had misread the source: Diodorus puts the temple too far north for it to have been Mecca.

Marinus of Tyre (70-130) explicitly mentions that the Arabs showed devotion to a “quadrangular stone”, likely referring to the Black Stone of the Kaaba, giving evidence that it was venerated centuries before Islam.

==== In the Quran ====
In the Qur'an, from the era of the life of Muhammad, the Kaaba is mentioned by the following names:

- al-Bayt (Arabic: ٱلْبَيْت, lit. 'the house') in 2:125 by Allah^{[Quran 2:125]}
- Baytī (Arabic: بَيْتِي, lit. 'My House') in 22:26 by Allah^{[Quran 22:26]}
- Baytik al-Muḥarram (Arabic: بَيْتِكَ ٱلْمُحَرَّم, lit. 'Your Inviolable House') in 14:37 by Ibrahim^{[Quran 14:37]}
- al-Bayt al-Ḥarām (Arabic: ٱلْبَيْت ٱلْحَرَام, lit. 'The Sacred House') in 5:97 by Allah^{[Quran 5:97]}
- al-Bayt al-ʿAtīq (Arabic: ٱلْبَيْت ٱلْعَتِيق, lit. 'The Ancient House') in 22:29 by Allah^{[Quran 22:29]}

The Qur'an contains several verses regarding the origin of the Kaaba. It states that the Kaaba was the first House of Worship for mankind, and that it was built by Ibrahim and Ismail on Allah's instructions:

Verily, the first House (of worship) appointed for mankind was that at Bakkah (Makkah), full of blessing, and a guidance for mankind.

— Quran, Surah Al Imran (3), Ayah 96

Behold! We gave the site, to Ibrahim, of the (Sacred) House, (saying): "Associate not anything (in worship) with Me; and sanctify My House for those who compass it round, or stand up, or bow, or prostrate themselves (therein in prayer)."

— Quran, Surah Al-Hajj (22), Ayah 26

And remember Ibrahim and Ismail raised the foundations of the House (With this prayer): "Our Lord! Accept (this service) from us: For Thou art the All-Hearing, the All-knowing."

— Quran, Al-Baqarah (2), Ayah 127

Ibn Kathir, in his famous exegesis (tafsir) of the Quran, mentions two interpretations among the Muslims on the origin of the Kaaba. One is that the temple was a place of worship for mala'ikah (angels) before the creation of man. Later, a house of worship was built on the location and was lost during the flood in Nuh (Noah)'s time and was finally rebuilt by Ibrahim and Ismail as mentioned later in the Quran. Ibn Kathir regarded this tradition as weak and preferred instead the narration by Ali ibn Abi Talib that although several other temples might have preceded the Kaaba, it was the first Bayt Allah ('House of God'), dedicated solely to him, built by his instruction, and sanctified and blessed by him, as stated in Quran 22:26-29. A hadith in Sahih al-Bukhari states that the Kaaba was the first masjid on Earth, and the second was Al-Aqsa in Jerusalem.

Narrated Abu Dhar: I said, "O Allah's Messenger (ﷺ)! Which mosque was first built on the surface of the earth?" He said, "Al- Masjid-ul-,Haram (in Mecca)." I said, "Which was built next?" He replied "The mosque of Al-Aqsa ( in Jerusalem) ." I said, "What was the period of construction between the two?" He said, "Forty years." He added, "Wherever (you may be, and) the prayer time becomes due, perform the prayer there, for the best thing is to do so (i.e. to offer the prayers in time).

— Sahih al-Bukhari 3366

While Abraham was building the Kaaba, an angel brought to him the Black Stone which he placed in the eastern corner of the structure. Another stone was the Maqam Ibrahim, the Station of Abraham, where Abraham stood for elevation while building the structure. The Black Stone and the Maqam Ibrahim are believed by Muslims to be the only remnants of the original structure made by Abraham, as the remaining structure had to be demolished and rebuilt several times over history for its maintenance. After the construction was complete, God enjoined the descendants of Ismail to perform an annual pilgrimage: the Hajj and the Qurban, sacrifice of cattle. The vicinity of the temple was also made a sanctuary where bloodshed and war were forbidden.^{[Quran 22:26-33]}

=== During Muhammad's lifetime ===
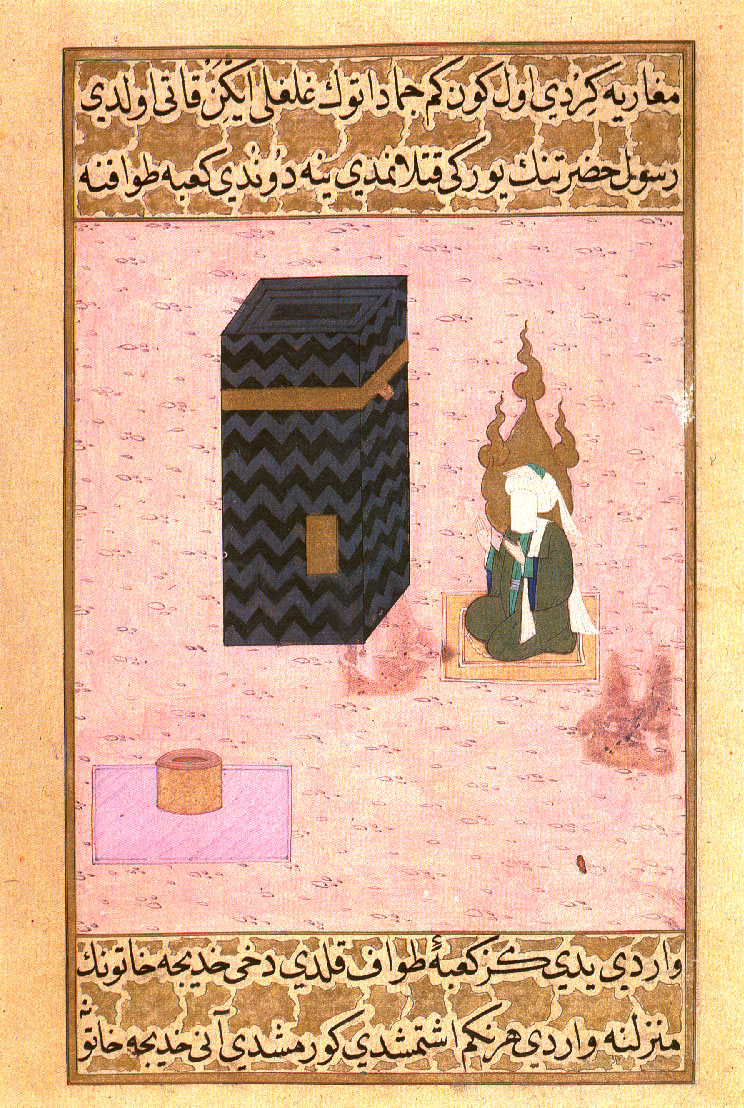
"Muhammad at the Ka'ba" from the Siyer-i Nebi. Muhammad is shown with veiled face, c. 1595 CE.

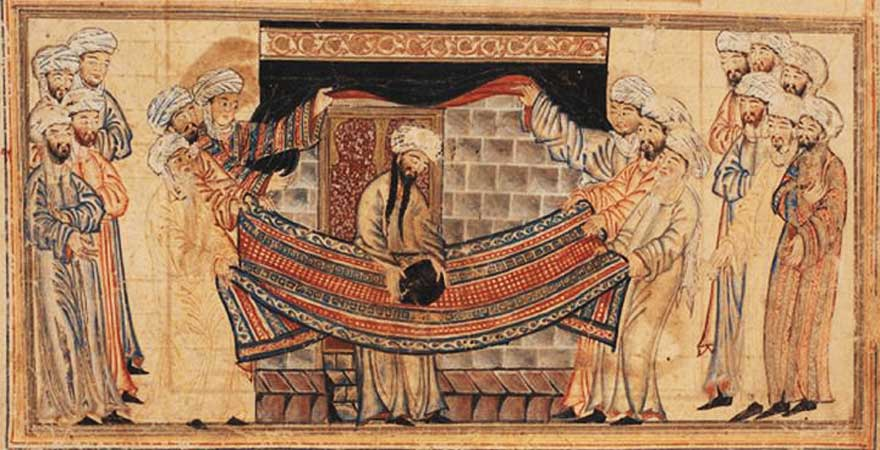
Miniature from Jami' al-tawarikh, 706 AH (1306/1307 CE), depicting Muhammad and others moving the black stone into the Kaaba

During Muhammad's lifetime (570–632 CE), the Kaaba was considered a holy site by the local Arabs. Muhammad took part in the reconstruction of the Kaaba around 600 CE, after its structure was weakened by a fire, and then damaged by a subsequent flood. Sources including Ibn Ishaq's Sirat Rasūl Allāh, one of the biographies of Muhammad (as reconstructed and translated by Guillaume), as well as Al-Azraqi's chronicle of Mecca, describe Muhammad settling a quarrel between the Meccan clans as to which clan should set the Black Stone in its place. According to Ishaq's biography, Muhammad's solution was to have all the clan elders raise the cornerstone on a cloak, after which Muhammad set the stone into its final place with his own hands. The timber for the reconstruction of the Kaaba was purchased by Quraysh from a Byzantine ship that had been wrecked on the Red Sea coast at Shu'aybah. The work was undertaken by a Coptic Egyptian carpenter from the same ship, called Baqum (باخوم Pachomius), the name indicates an Egyptian Origin, The name Pachomius means "eagle" or "falcon", It comes from the Coptic word "akhōm" (eagle/falcon), which originally meant "divine image" in Middle Egyptian. Financial constraints during this rebuilding caused Quraysh to exclude six cubits from the northern part of the Kaaba. This portion is what is currently known as Al-Hateem الحطيم or Hijr Ismail حجر اسماعيل.

Muhammad's Isra' is said to have taken him from the Kaaba to the Masjid al-Aqsa and heavenwards from there.

Muslims initially considered Jerusalem as their qibla, or prayer direction, and faced toward it while offering prayers; however, pilgrimage to the Kaaba was considered a religious duty though its rites were not yet finalized. During the first half of Muhammad's time as a prophet while he was at Mecca, he and his followers were severely persecuted which eventually led to their migration to Medina in 622 CE. In 624 CE, Muslims believe the direction of the qibla was changed from the Masjid al-Aqsa to the Masjid al-Haram in Mecca, with the revelation of Surah Al-Baqara 2:144. In 628 CE, Muhammad led a group of Muslims towards Mecca with the intention of performing the Umrah, but was prevented from doing so by the Quraysh. He secured a peace treaty with them, the Treaty of Hudaybiyyah, which allowed the Muslims to freely perform pilgrimage at the Kaaba from the following year.

At the culmination of his mission, in 630 CE, after the allies of the Quraysh, the Banu Bakr, violated the Treaty of Hudaybiyyah, Muhammad conquered Mecca. His first action was to remove statues and images from the Kaaba. According to reports collected by Ibn Ishaq and al-Azraqi, Muhammad spared a painting of Mary and Jesus, and a fresco of Ibrahim.

Narrated Abdullah: When the Prophet entered Mecca on the day of the conquest, there were 360 idols around the Kaaba. The Prophet started striking them with a stick he had in his hand and was saying, "Truth has come and Falsehood has vanished..." (Qur'an 17:81)

— Muhammad al-Bukhari, Sahih al-Bukhari, Book 59, Hadith 583

Al-Azraqi further conveys how Muhammad, after he entered the Kaaba on the day of the conquest, ordered all the pictures erased except that of Maryam:

Shihab (said) that the Prophet (peace be upon him) entered the Kaaba on the day of the conquest, and in it was a picture of the angels (mala'ika), among others, and he saw a picture of Ibrahim and he said: "May Allah kill those representing him as a venerable old man casting arrows in divination (shaykhan yastaqsim bil-azlam)." Then he saw the picture of Maryam, so he put his hands on it and he said: "Erase what is in it [the Kaaba] in the way of pictures except the picture of Maryam."

— al-Azraqi, Akhbar Mecca: History of Mecca

After the conquest, Muhammad restated the sanctity and holiness of Mecca, including its Great Mosque (Masjid al-Haram), in Islam. He performed the Hajj in 632 CE called the Hujjat ul-Wada' ("Farewell Pilgrimage") since Muhammad prophesied his impending death on this event.

After Muhammad's conquest of Mecca, it is said that the 360 idols of the Kaaba were destroyed. The Kaaba became a site for the veneration of Allah only, identified as the same God as that of other monotheists. The Kaaba continued to be a site of annual pilgrimage, and Muslims would perform the Salat prayer facing Al-Aqsa Mosque in Jerusalem, as instructed by Muhammad, and turning their backs on the pagan associations of the Kabah.

=== After Muhammad ===
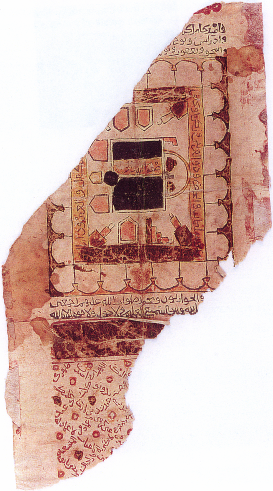
One of the oldest depictions of the Kaaba from a blockprinted Hajj certificate, early 1200s Ayyubid Syria

The Kaaba has been repaired and reconstructed many times. The structure was severely damaged by a fire on 3 Rabi' I 64 AH (Sunday 31 October 683 CE), during the first siege of Mecca in 683 in the war between the Umayyads and 'Abdullah ibn al-Zubayr, an early Muslim who ruled Mecca for many years between the death of ʿAli and the consolidation of power by the Umayyads. 'Abdullah rebuilt it to include the hatīm. He did so on the basis of a tradition (found in several hadith collections) that the hatīm was a remnant of the foundations of the Abrahamic Kaaba, and that Muhammad himself had wished to rebuild it so as to include it.

The Kaaba was bombarded with stones in the second siege of Mecca in 692, in which the Umayyad army was led by al-Hajjaj ibn Yusuf. The fall of the city and the death of 'Abdullah ibn al-Zubayr allowed the Umayyads under 'Abd al-Malik ibn Marwan to finally reunite all the Islamic possessions and end the long civil war. In 693 CE, 'Abd al-Malik had the remnants of al-Zubayr's Kaaba razed, and rebuilt it on the foundations set by the Quraysh. The Kaaba returned to the cube shape it had taken during Muhammad's time. Its basic shape and structure have not changed since then.

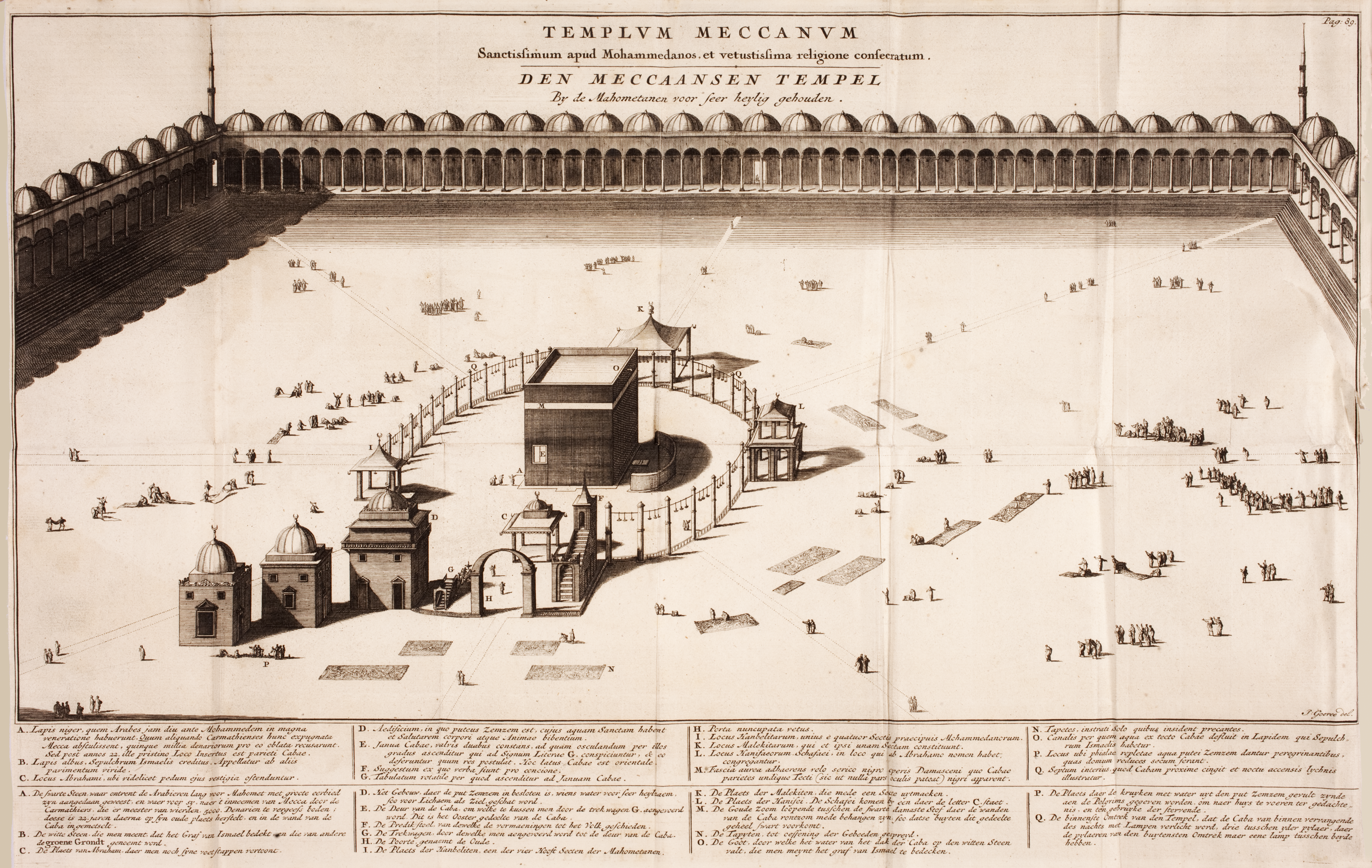
View of the Kaaba, 1718. Adriaan Reland: Verhandeling van de godsdienst der Mahometaanen

During its history, the Black Stone at the Kaaba has been struck and smashed by a stone fired from a catapult, it has been smeared with excrement, stolen and ransomed by the Qarmatians and smashed into several fragments.

During the Hajj of 930 CE, the Shi'ite Qarmatians attacked Mecca under Abu Tahir al-Jannabi, defiled the Zamzam Well with the bodies of pilgrims and stole the Black Stone, taking it to the oasis in Eastern Arabia known as al-Aḥsāʾ, where it remained until the Abbasids ransomed it in 952 CE.

The earliest depiction of the Kaaba seems to have been in the mosaics of the Great Umayyad Mosque of Damascus (705-15), perhaps near the mihrab or qibla wall. However, this image does not survive. Almost four centuries later in 1093-1095 a monumental depiction of Mecca was carved on a slab in Mosul. In 1193, the Kaaba was depicted on an illustrated Hajj certificate, representing the earliest known image of the Kaaba which was circulated, these would only become more popular over the next half century. These typically show Mecca from above, but in the early 18th century a more slanted and less flattened view began to emerge.

After heavy rains and flooding in 1626, the walls of the Kaaba collapsed and the Mosque was damaged. The same year, during the reign of Ottoman Emperor Murad IV, the Kaaba was rebuilt with granite stones from Mecca, and the Mosque was renovated.

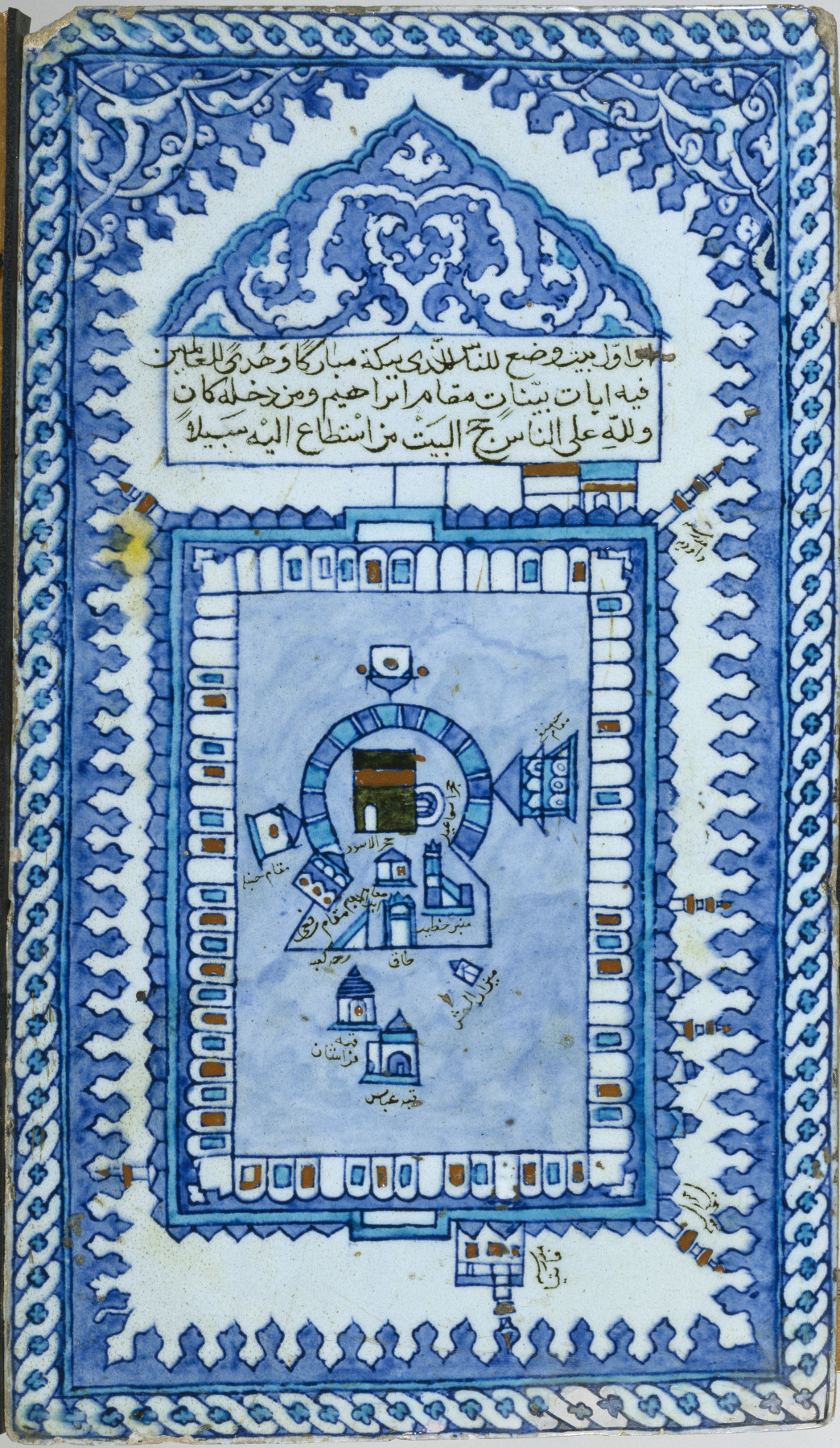
Ottoman tiles representing the Kaaba in the 17th century

In 1916, after Hussein bin Ali had launched the Great Arab Revolt, during the Battle of Mecca between Arab and Ottoman forces, the Ottoman troops bombarded the city and hit the Kaaba, setting fire to the protective veil. This incident was later exploited by the propaganda of the Great Arab Revolt to attempt to demonstrate the impiety of the Ottomans and the legitimacy of the revolt as a holy war.

On 15 March 1935, three armed men from Oman attacked and tried to assassinate King Ibn Saud during his performance of Hajj. He survived the attack unhurt, through the intervention of the crown prince, and the three attackers were killed by bodyguards.

The Kaaba is depicted on the reverse of 500 Saudi riyal and 2000 Iranian rial banknotes.

Al-Azraqi provided the following narrative on the authority of his grandfather:

I have heard that there was set up in al-Bayt (referring to the Kaaba) a picture (Arabic: تمثال, romanized: Timthal, lit. 'Depiction') of Maryam and 'Isa. ['Ata'] said: "Yes, there was set in it a picture of Maryam adorned (muzawwaqan); in her lap, her son Isa sat adorned."

— al-Azraqi, Akhbar Mecca: History of Mecca

The Kaaba came to be considered the axis mundi (world center), with the Gate of Heaven directly above it. The Kaaba marked the location where the sacred world intersected with the profane; the embedded Black Stone was a further symbol of this as a meteorite that had fallen from the sky and linked heaven and earth.

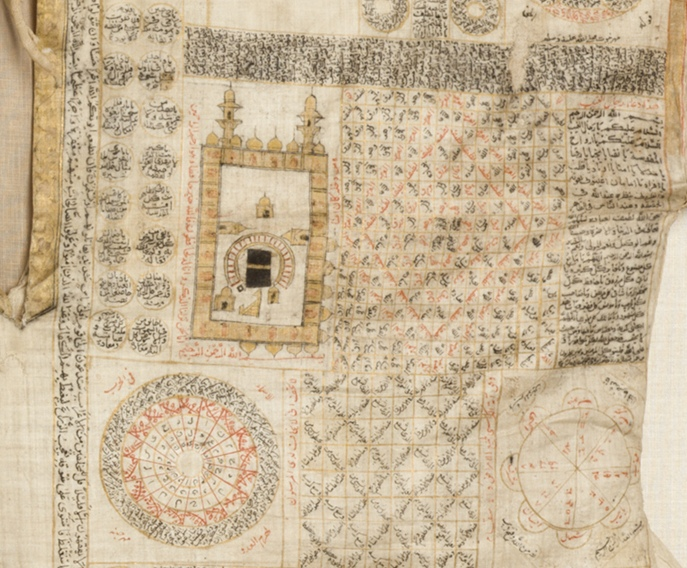
The Kaaba and Masjid al-Haram depicted on a talismanic shirt, 16th or early 17th century

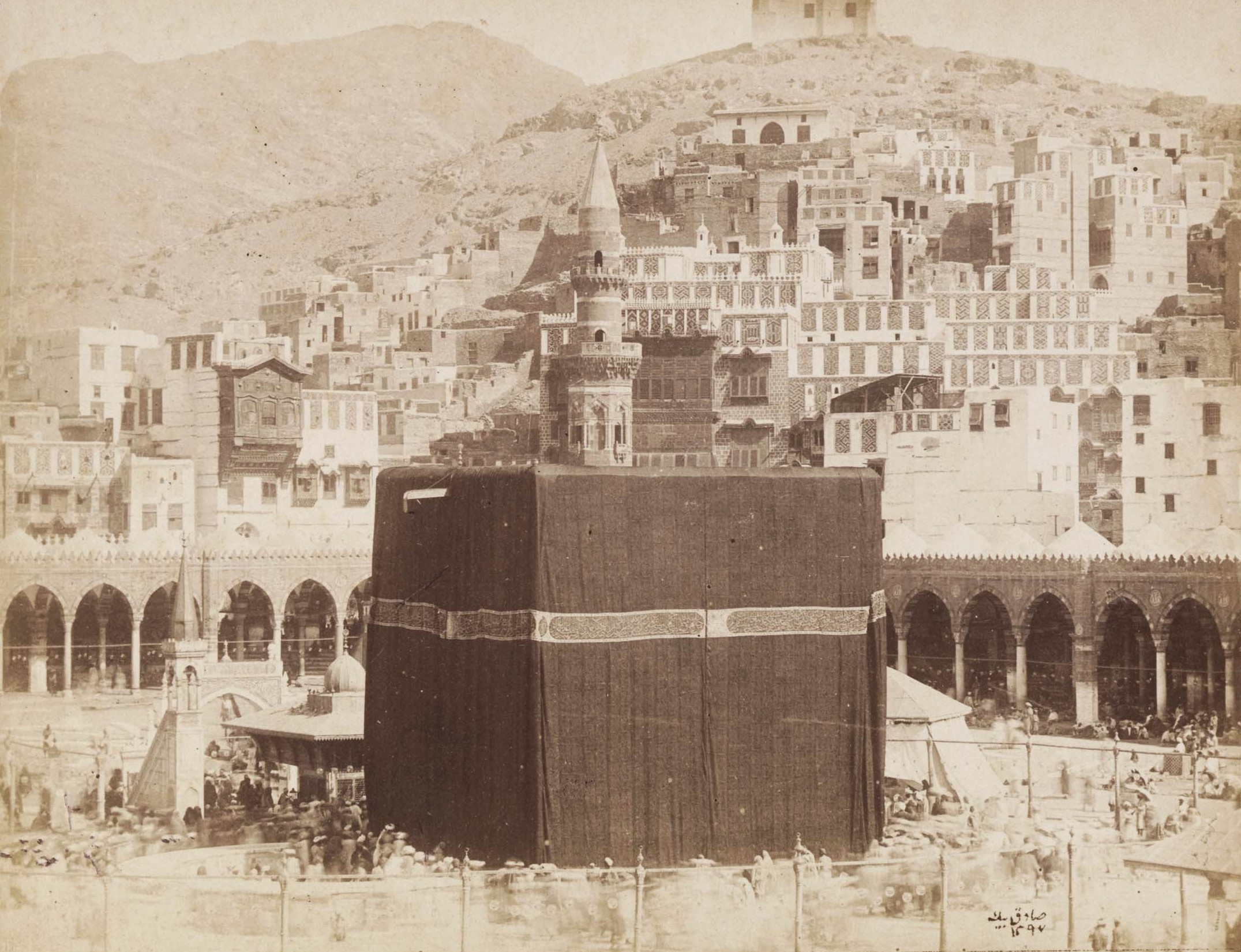
Photographed in 1880 by Muhammad Sadiq

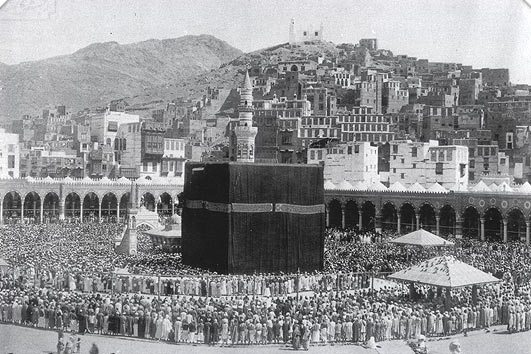
In 1907

=== In non-Islamic literature ===
The Khuzistan Chronicle is a short Nestorian (Christian origin) chronicle written no later than the 660s CE covers the history up to the Arab conquest and gives an interesting note on Arabian geography. The section covering the geography starts with a speculation about the origin of the Muslim sanctuary in Arabia:

Regarding the K'bta (Kaaba) of Ibrahim, we have been unable to discover what it is except that, because the blessed Abraham grew rich in property and wanted to get away from the envy of the Canaanites, he chose to live in the distant and spacious parts of the desert. Since he lived in tents, he built that place for the worship of God and for the offering of sacrifices. It took its present name from what it had been, since the memory of the place was preserved with the generations of their race. Indeed, it was no new thing for the Arabs to worship there, but goes back to antiquity, to their early days, in that they show honor to the father of the head of their people.

According to the Asatir, a 10th-century work of Samaritan literature, Ismail and his eldest son Nebaioth built the Kaaba as well as the city of Mecca."

=== Opinions of some Western writers ===
Patricia Crone and Tom Holland have cast doubt on the claim that Mecca was a major historical trading outpost. Other scholars such as Glen Bowersock disagree and assert that it was. Crone later on disregarded some of her theories. She argues that Meccan trade relied on skins, hides, manufactured leather goods, clarified butter, Hijazi woollens, and camels. She suggests that most of these goods were destined for the Roman army, which is known to have required colossal quantities of leather and hides for its equipment.

== Architecture and interior ==
The Kaaba is a cuboid-shaped structure made of stones. It is approximately 15 m (49 ft 3 in) high with sides measuring 12 m (39 ft 4 in) × 10.5 m (34 ft 5 in) wide. (Note: Hawting states 10 m (32 ft 10 in).) Inside the Kaaba, the floor is made of marble and limestone. The interior walls are clad with tiled, white marble halfway to the roof, with darker trimmings along the floor. The floor of the interior stands about 2 m (6 ft 7 in) above the ground area where tawaf is performed.

The wall directly adjacent to the entrance of the Kaaba has six tablets inlaid with inscriptions, and there are several more tablets along the other walls. Along the top corners of the walls runs a black cloth embroidered with gold Qur'anic verses. Caretakers anoint the marble cladding with the same scented oil used to anoint the Black Stone outside. Three pillars (some erroneously report two) stand inside the Kaaba, with a small altar or table set between one and the other two. Lamp-like objects (possible lanterns or crucible censers) hang from the ceiling. The ceiling itself is of a darker colour, similar in hue to the lower trimming. The Bāb ut-Tawbah—on the right wall (right of the entrance) opens to an enclosed staircase that leads to a hatch, which itself opens to the roof. Both the roof and ceiling (collectively dual-layered) are made of stainless steel-capped teak wood.

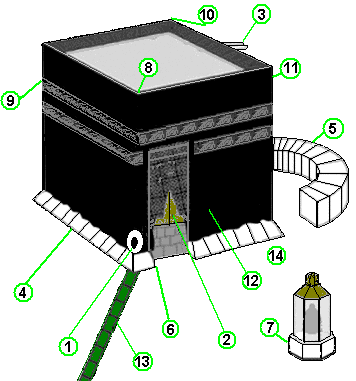

A technical drawing of the Kaaba showing dimensions and elements

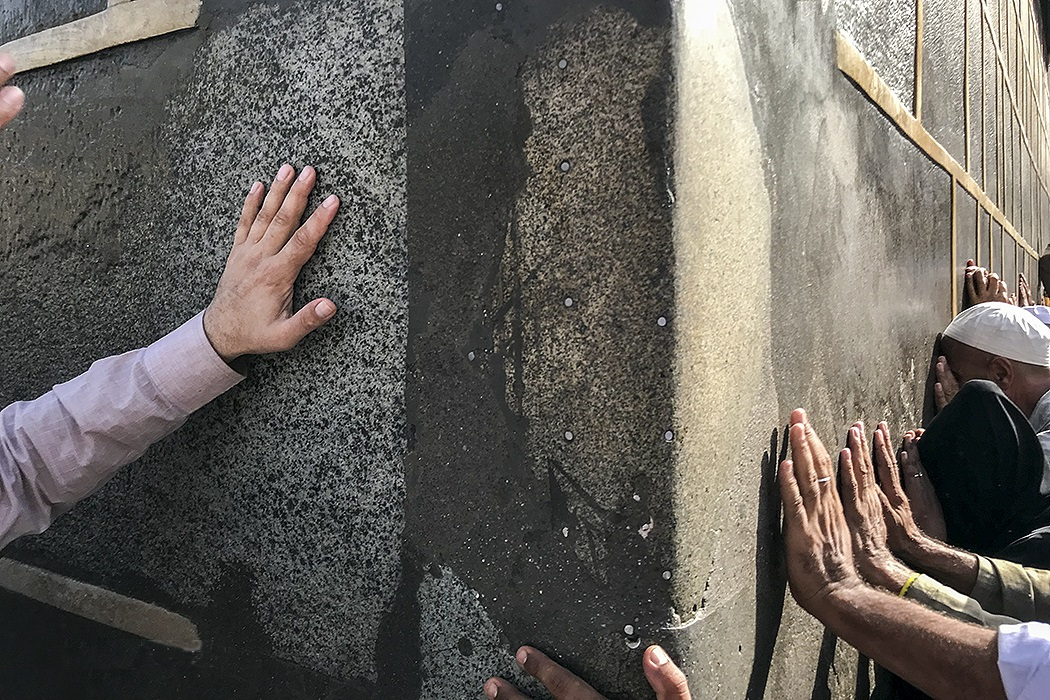
Rukn al-Yamani (The Yemeni Corner)

Each numbered item in the following list corresponds to features noted in the diagram image.

1. The Ḥajar al-Aswad (Arabic: الحجر الأسود, romanized: al-Hajar al-Aswad, lit. 'The Black Stone'), is located on the Kaaba's eastern corner. It is the location where Muslims start their circumambulation of the Kaaba, known as the tawaf.
2. The entrance is a door set 2.13 m (7 ft 0 in) above the ground on the north-eastern wall of the Kaaba, called the Bāb ar-Raḥmah (Arabic: باب الرحمة, romanized: Bāb ar-Raḥmah, lit. 'Door of Mercy'), that also acts as the façade. In 1979, the 300 kg (660 lb) gold doors made by artist Ahmad bin Ibrahim Badr, replaced the old silver doors made by his father, Ibrahim Badr, in 1942. There is a wooden staircase on wheels, usually stored in the mosque between the arch-shaped gate of Banū Shaybah and the Zamzam Well. The oldest surviving door dates back to 1045 AH (1635–6 CE).
3. The Mīzāb ar-Raḥmah, commonly shortened to Mīzāb or Meezab is a rain spout made of gold. Added when the Kaaba was rebuilt in 1627, after a flood in 1626 caused three of the four walls to collapse.
4. This slant structure, covering three sides of the Kaaba, is known as the Shadherwaan (Arabic: شاذروان) and was added in 1627 along with the Mīzāb ar-Raḥmah to protect the foundation from rainwater.
5. The Hatīm (also romanized as hateem) and known as the Hijr Ismail, is a low wall that was part of the original Kaaba. It is a semi-circular wall opposite, but not connected to, the north-west wall of the Kaaba. It is 1.31 m (4 ft 3 1/2 in) in height and 1.5 m (4 ft 11 in) in width, and is composed of white marble. The space between the hatīm and the Kaaba was originally part of the Kaaba, and is thus not entered during the tawaf.
6. al-Multazam, the roughly 2 m (6 1/2 ft) space along the wall between the Black Stone and the entry door. It is sometimes considered pious or desirable for a pilgrim to touch this area of the Kaaba, or perform dua here.
7. The Station of Ibrahim (Maqam Ibrahim) is a glass and metal enclosure with what is said to be an imprint of Ibrahim's feet. Ibrahim is said to have stood on this stone during the construction of the upper parts of the Kaaba, raising Ismail on his shoulders for the uppermost parts.
8. The corner of the Black Stone. It faces very slightly southeast from the center of the Kaaba. The four corners of the Kaaba roughly point toward the four cardinal directions of the compass.
9. The Rukn al-Yamani (Arabic: الركن اليمني, romanized: ar-Rukn al-Yamani, lit. 'The Yemeni Corner'), also known as Rukn-e-Yamani or Rukn-e-Yemeni, is the corner of the Kaaba facing slightly southwest from the center of the Kaaba.
10. The Rukn ush-Shami (Arabic: الركن الشامي, romanized: ar-Rukn ash-Shami, lit. 'The Levantine Corner'), also known as Rukn-e-Shami, is the corner of the Kaaba facing very slightly northwest from the center of the Kaaba.
11. The Rukn al-'Iraqi (Arabic: الركن العراقي, romanized: ar-Rukn al-'Iraqi, lit. 'The Iraqi Corner'), is the corner that faces slightly northeast from the center of the Kaaba.
12. Kiswah, the embroidered covering. Kiswa is a black silk and gold curtain which is replaced annually during the Hajj pilgrimage. Two-thirds of the way up is the hizam, a band of gold-embroidered Quranic text, including the Shahada, the Islamic declaration of faith. The curtain over the door of the Kaaba is especially ornate and is known as the sitara or burqu'. The hizam and sitara have inscriptions embroidered in gold and silver wire, including verses from the Quran and supplications to Allah.
13. Marble stripe marking the beginning and end of each circumambulation.

Note: The major (long) axis of the Kaaba has been observed to align with the rising of the star Canopus toward which its southern wall is directed, while its minor axis (its east–west facades) roughly align with the sunrise of summer solstice and the sunset of winter solstice.

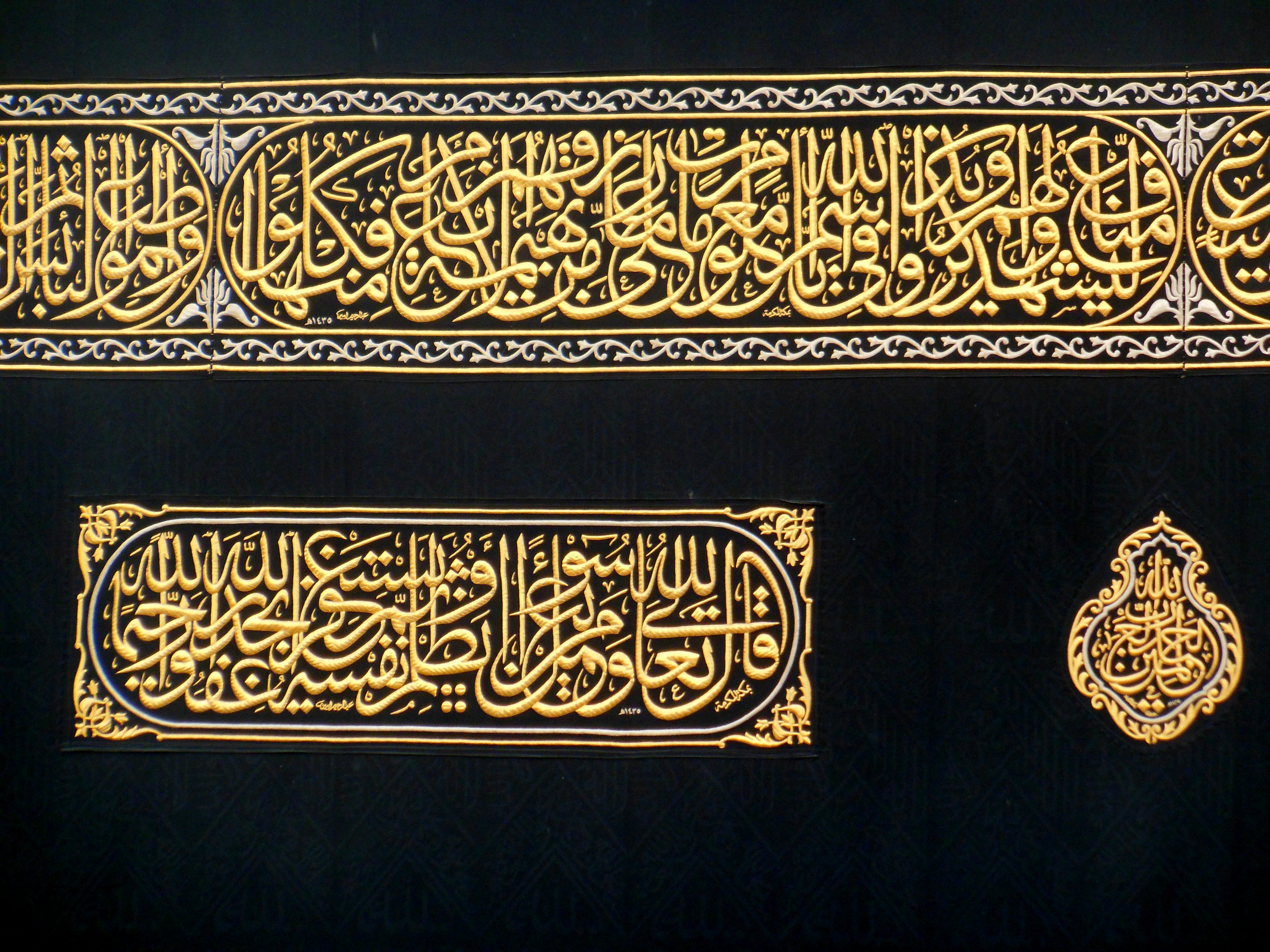
Textile cover of the Kaaba (called Kiswah) with Islamic inscriptions calligraphed in Arabic with golden threads

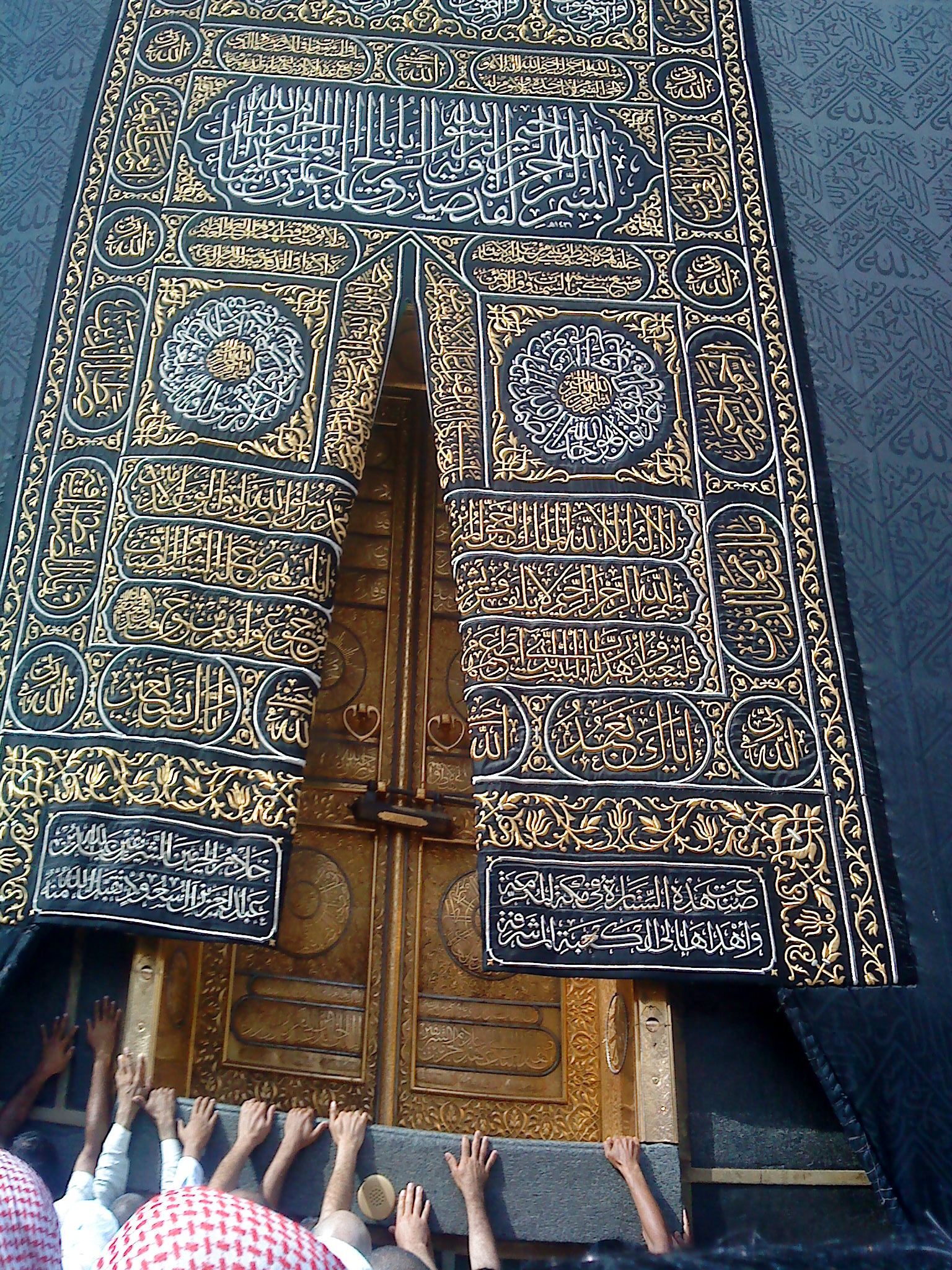
The Bāb at-Tawbah, "Door of Repentance"

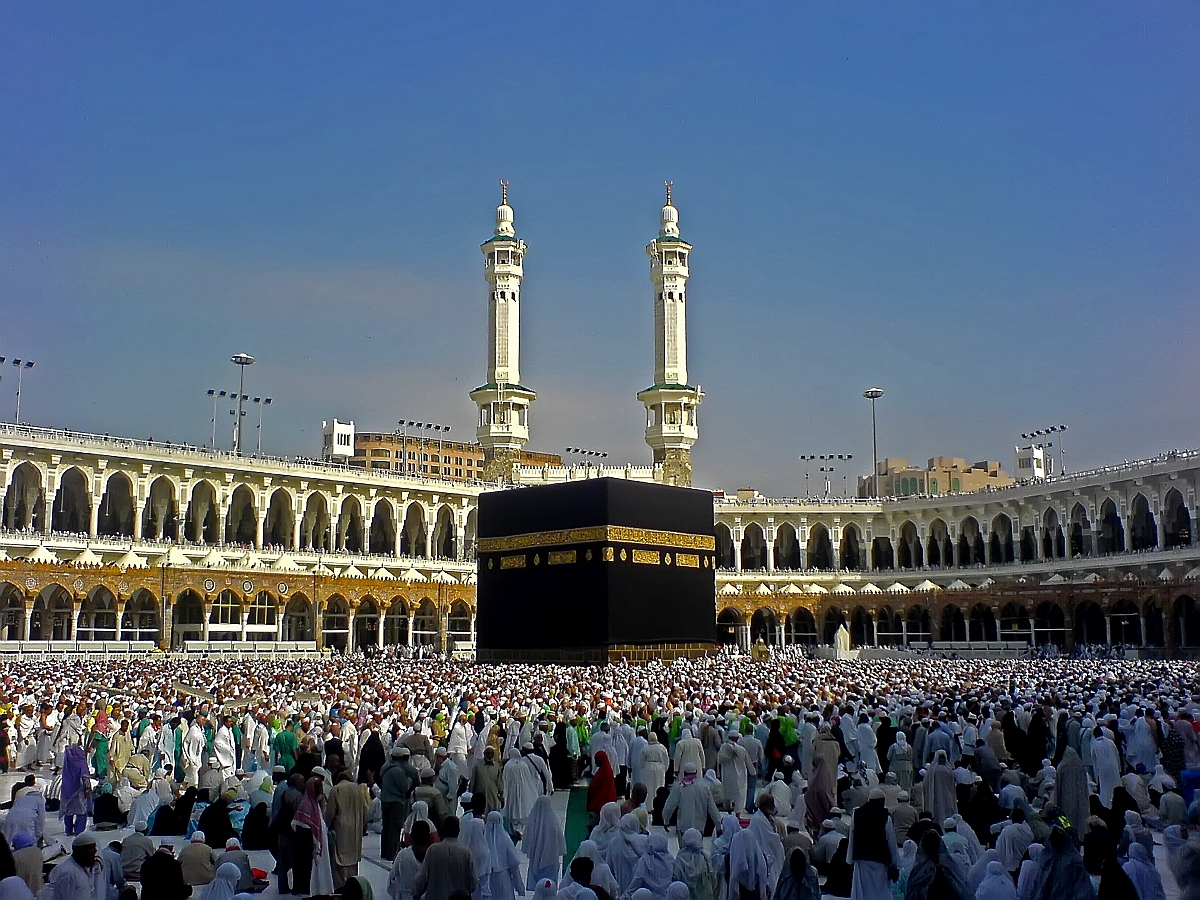
The Kaaba with the signature minarets. A similar view is printed on the obverse side of 500-riyal (approximately 133 USD) notes in Saudi Arabia.

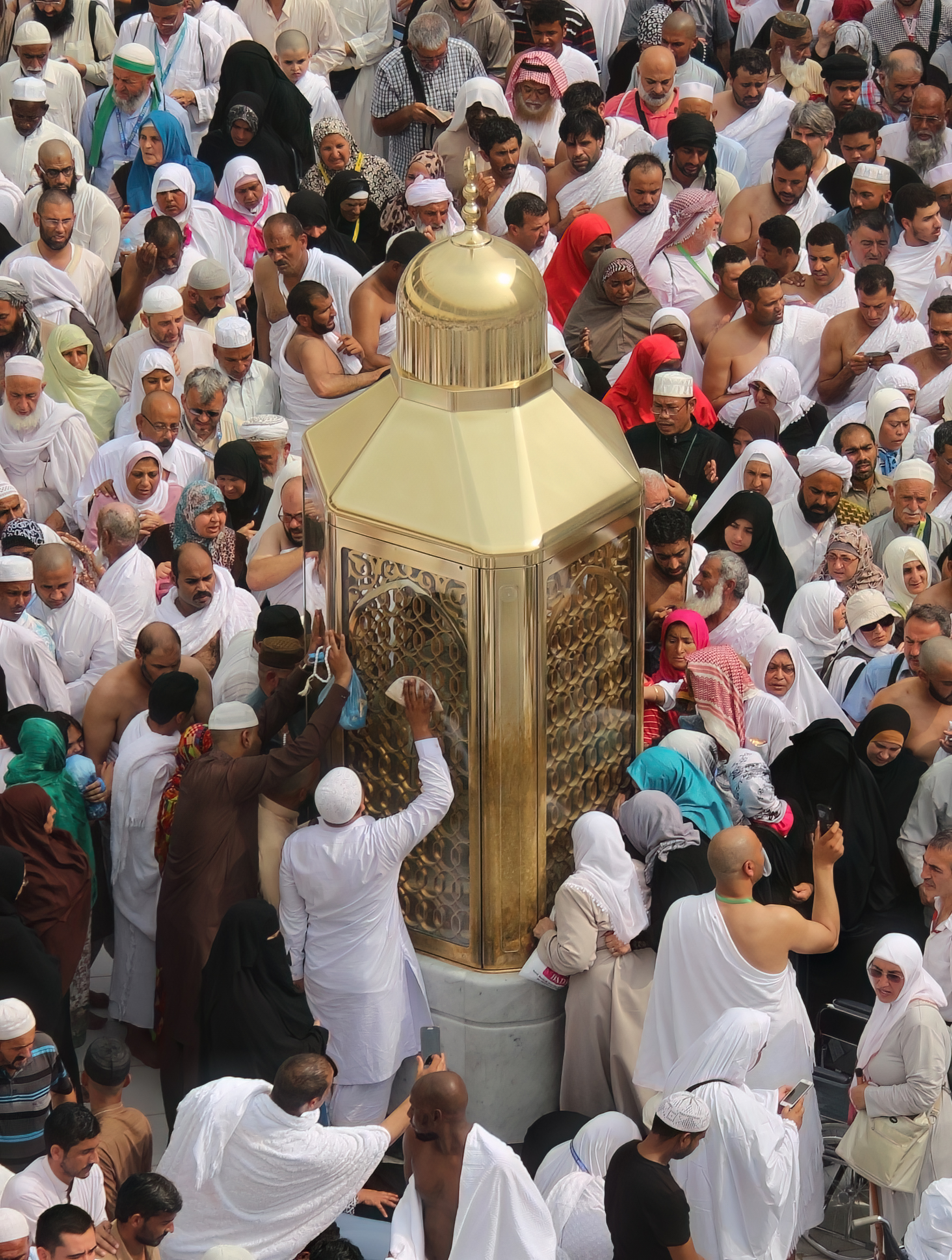
The Station of Ibrahim (Maqam Ibrahim)

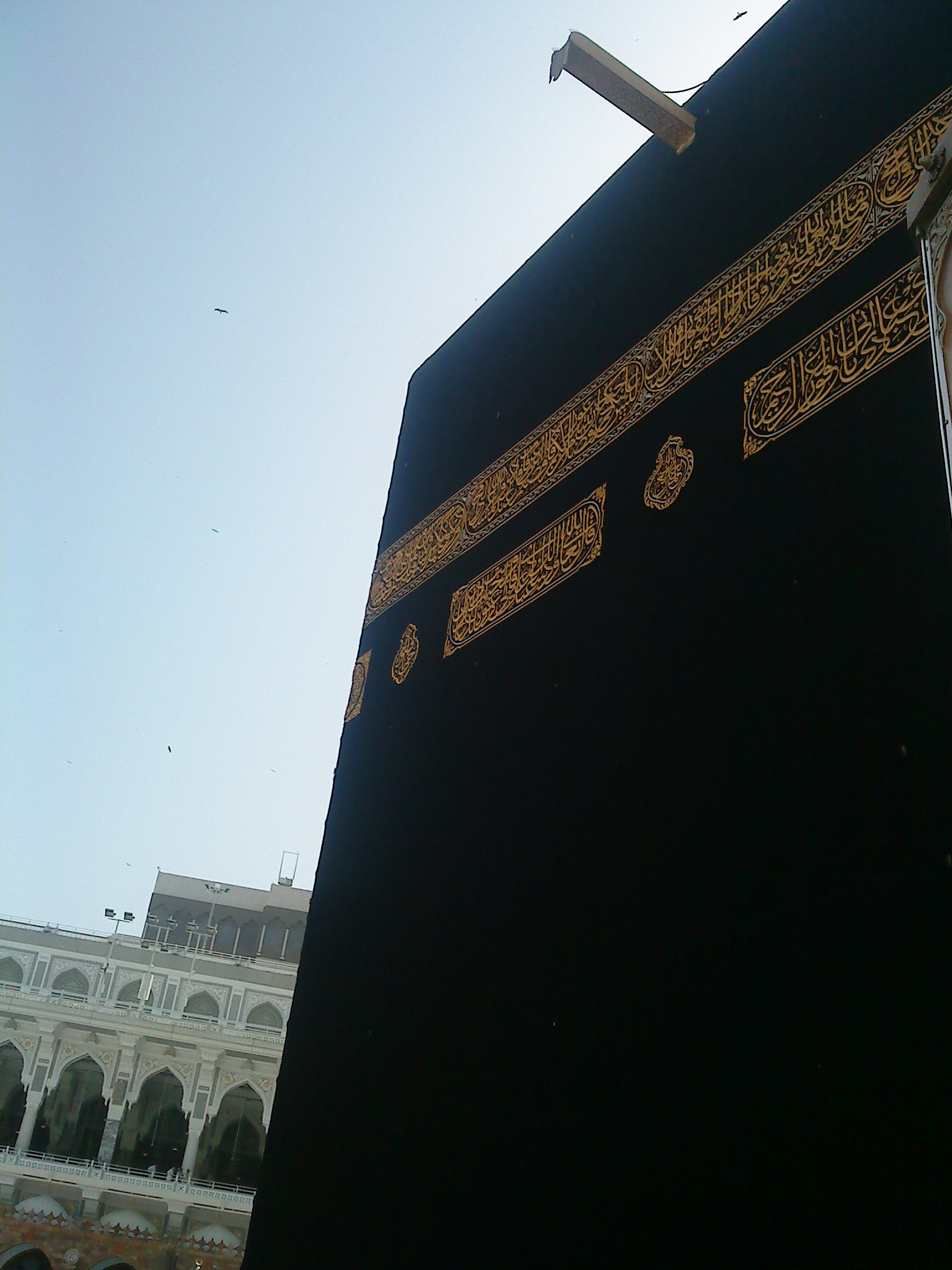
The Mīzāb al-Raḥmah

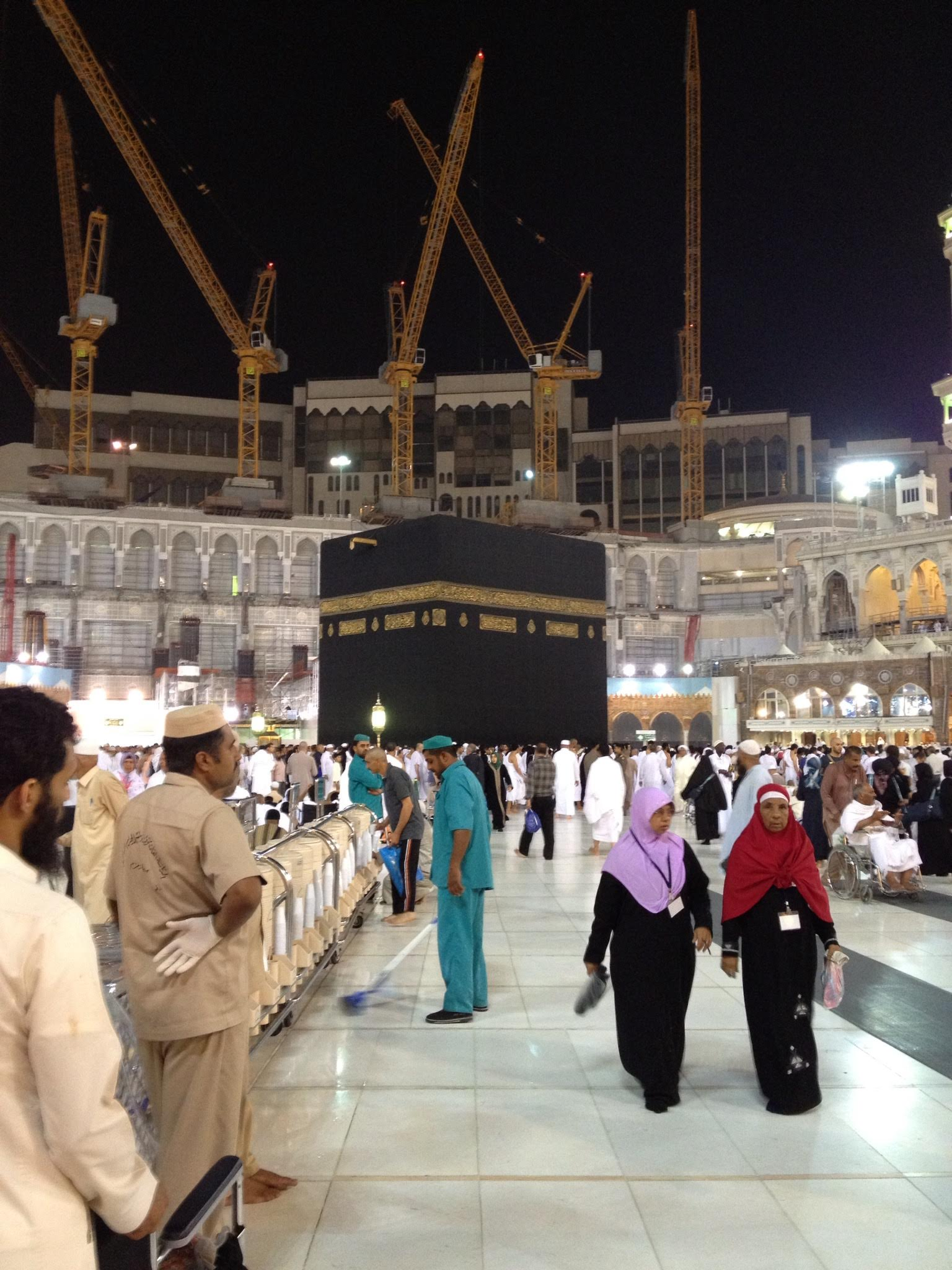
The Kaaba during an expansion phase in 2013

== Written marble documents inside the Kaaba ==
Inside the Kaaba, there were nine engraved marble stones, all written in the Thuluth script, except for one which is written in prominent Kufic script. In the eastern wall between the door and the Gate of Repentance another document was added by the custodian of the Two Holy Mosques at the time Fahd of Saudi Arabia, regarding his expansion of the mosque, thus bringing the number of documents to ten, all of which are inscribed on white marble.

Islamic sanctities received great attention from the Circassian sultans during the period in which they ruled the Islamic world (784–924 AH, 1382–1517 CE), with the Kaaba receiving significant attention. Of the ten marble slabs chronicling the architectural contributions of various rulers to Al-Masjid al-Haram, two of the slabs pertain to Circassian sultans.

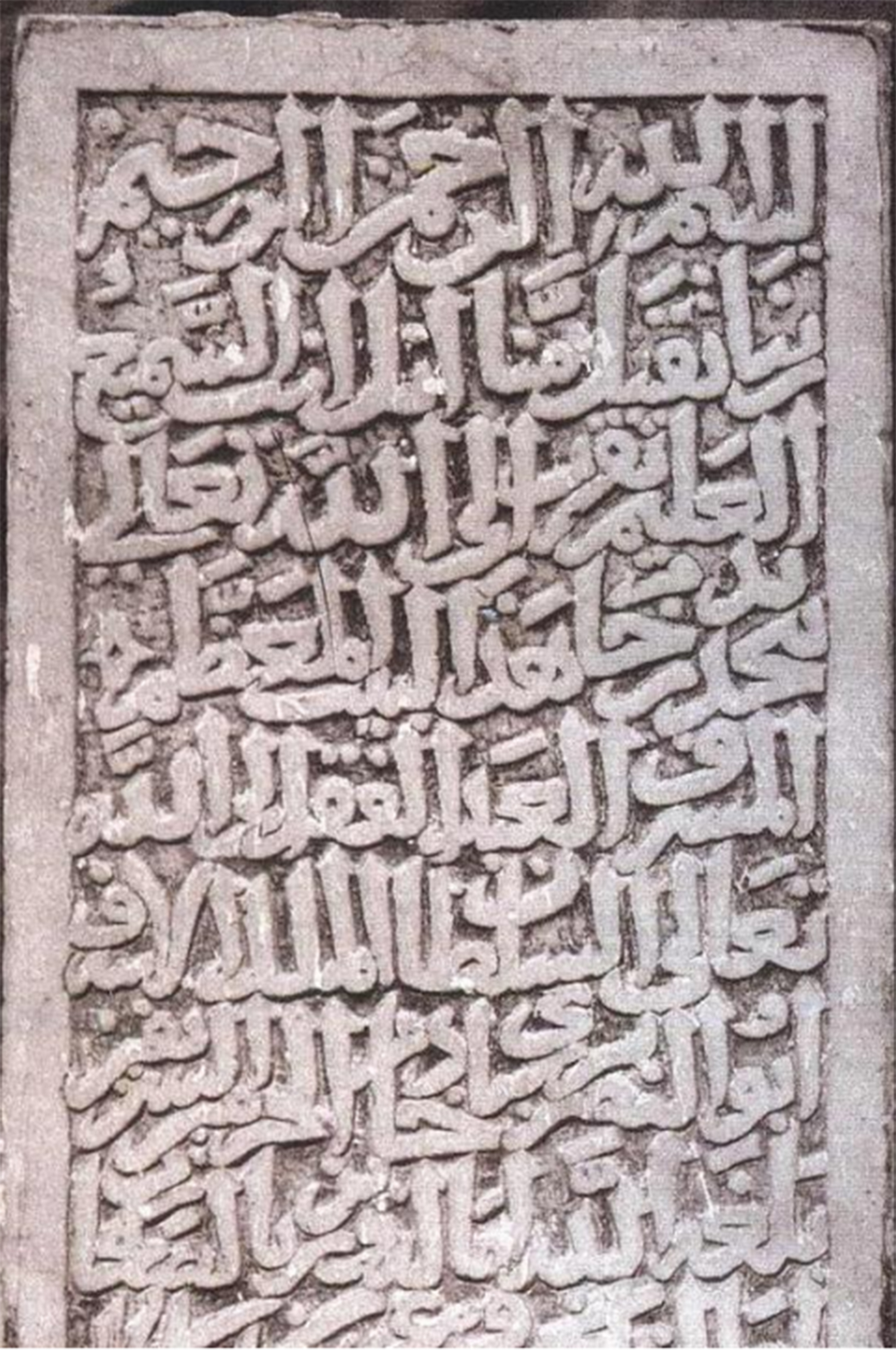
Sultan Barsbay inscription on the slab in Kaaba

One of these two records the achievements of one of the most notable circassians, Sultan Barsbay. The document, dated to 1423 (CE), attests to a wide reconstruction and restoration process in the mosque by the Sultan. The inscription on the slab reads:

بسم الله الرحمن الرحيم ربنا تقبل منا انك انت السميع العليم تقرب الى الله تعالى بتجديد رخام هذا البيت المعظم المشرف العبد الفقير الى الله تعالى السلطان الملك الاشرف ابو النصر برسباي خادم الحرمين الشريفين بلغه الله اماله و زين بالصالحات اعماله بتاريخ سنة ست و عشرين و ثمان مئه

This translates to:

"In the name of God, the Most Compassionate, the Most Merciful. Our Lord, accept from us that you are the All-Hearing, the All-Knowing. Draw nearer to God Almighty by renewing the marble of this noble and honorable house. The poor servant of God Almighty, the honorable Sultan King Abu al-Nasr Barsbay, Custodian of the Two Holy Mosques. May God reach his hopes and adorn his deeds with good deeds. The year eight hundred and twenty-six AH"

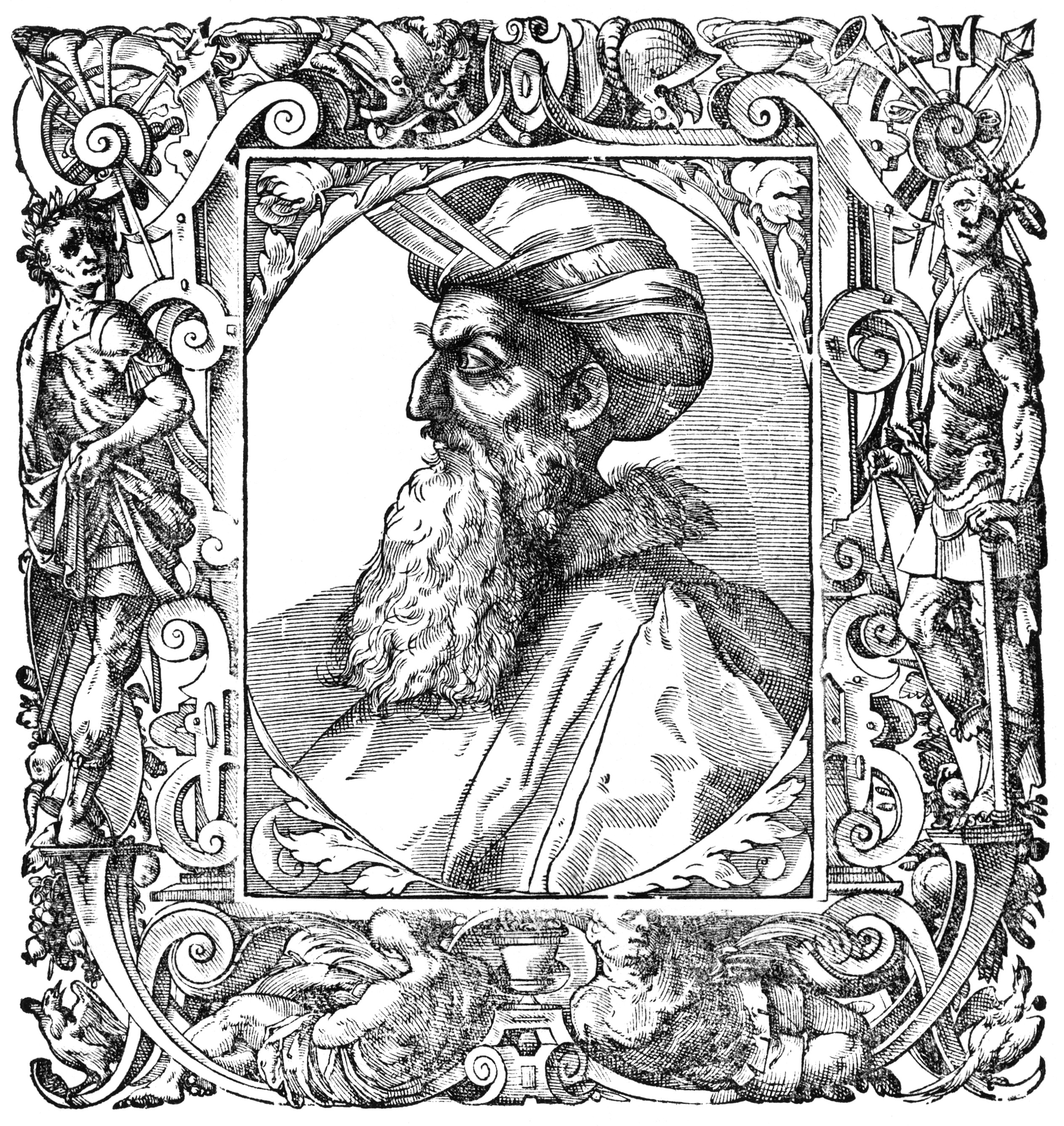
The Circassian Sultan Barsbay

The other of the two circassian slabs is dedicated to Barsbays son, Sultan Qaitbay, known for his great architectural achievements throughout the Islamic world. Dated to 1479 (CE), the document attests to a wide reconstruction and restoration process undertaken by Sultan Qaitbay for Al-Masjid Al-Haram.

The inscription reads:

بسم الله الرحمن الرحيم ربنا تقبل منا انك انت السميع العليم أمر بتجيد ترخيم داخل البيت مولانا السلطان الأشرف أبو النصر قايتباي خلد الله ملكه يارب العالمين بتاريخ مستهل رجب الفرد عام أربع و ثمانين و ثمانمائة من الهجرة

Which translates to:

"In the name of God, the Most Compassionate, the Most Merciful. Our Lord, accept from us that You are the All-Hearing, the All-Knowing. He commanded the perfection of melodious chanting inside the house. Our Lord, the honorable and victorious Sultan Qaytbay, may God immortalize his kingdom, Lord of the worlds, on the first of the month of Rajab in the year eight hundred and eighty-four AH."

== Significance in Islam ==
The Kaaba is the holiest site in Islam, and is often called by names such as the Bayt Allah (Arabic: بيت الله, romanized: Bayt Allah, lit. 'House of Allah'). and Bayt Allah al-Haram (Arabic: بيت الله الحرام, romanized: Bayt Allah il-Haram, lit. 'The Sacred House of Allah').

=== Tawaf ===
Pilgrims perform Tawaf around the Kaaba during Umrah (video)

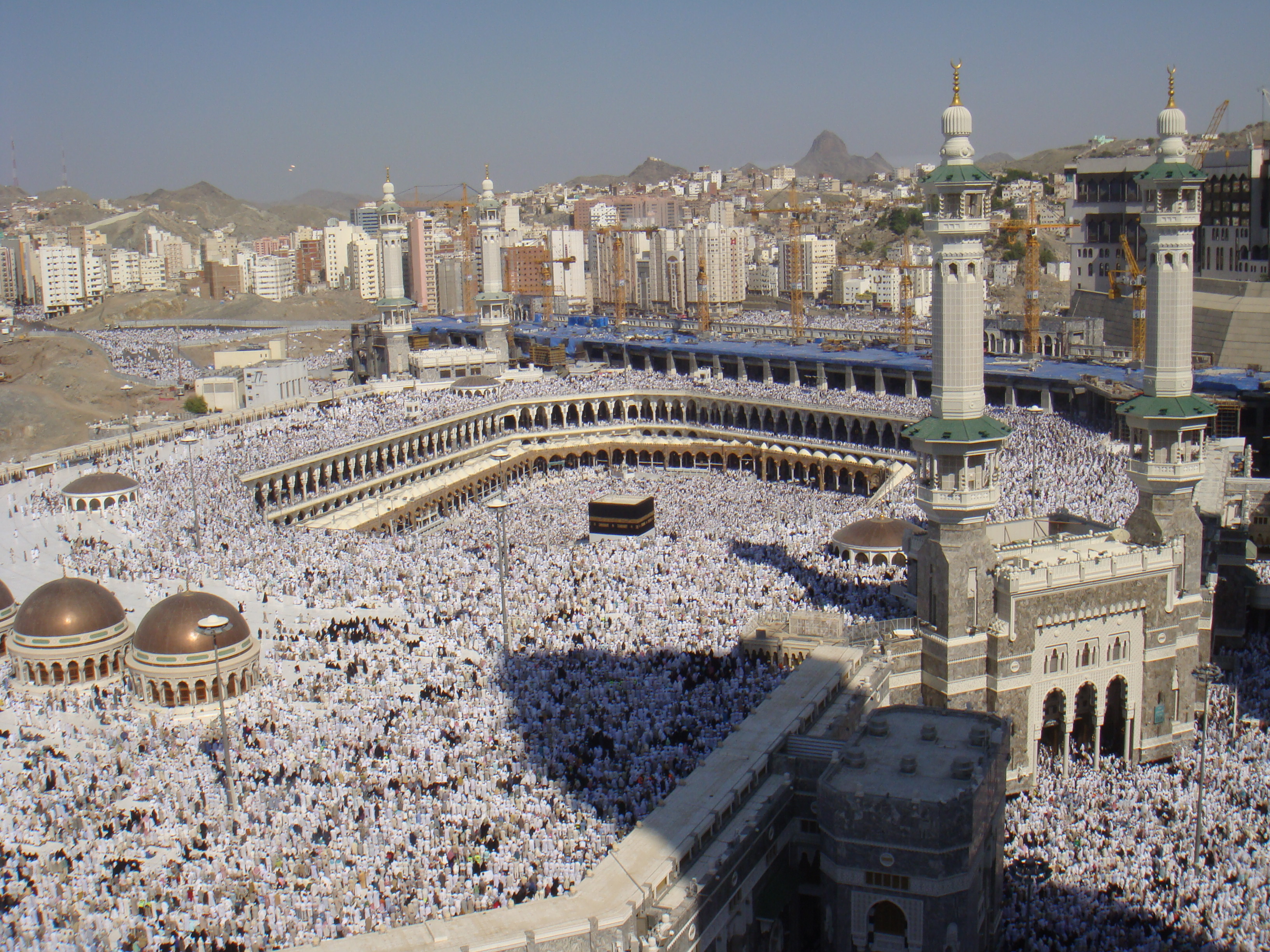
The Kaaba and the Masjid Al-Haram during Hajj, 2008

Ṭawāf (Arabic: طَوَاف, lit. 'going about') is one of the Islamic rituals of pilgrimage and is compulsory during both the Hajj and Umrah. Pilgrims go around the Kaaba (the most sacred site in Islam) seven times in a counterclockwise direction; the first three at a hurried pace on the outer part of the Mataaf and the latter four times closer to the Kaaba at a leisurely pace. The circling is believed to demonstrate the unity of the believers in the worship of the One God, as they move in harmony together around the Kaaba, while supplicating to God. To be in a state of Wudu (ablution) is mandatory while performing tawaf as it is considered to be a form of worship ('ibadah).

Tawaf begins from the corner of the Kaaba with the Black Stone. If possible, Muslims are to kiss or touch it, but this is often not possible because of the large crowds. They are also to chant the Basmala and Takbir each time they complete one revolution. Hajj pilgrims are generally advised to "make ṭawāf" at least twice – once as part of the Hajj, and again before leaving Mecca.

The five types of ṭawāf are:

- Ṭawāf al-Qudūm (arrival ṭawāf) is performed by those not residing in Mecca once reaching the Holy City.
- Ṭawāf aṭ-Ṭaḥīyah (greeting ṭawāf) is performed after entering al-Masjid al-Haram at any other times and is Mustahabb.
- Ṭawāf al-'Umrah (Umrah ṭawāf) refers to the ṭawāf performed specifically for Umrah.
- Ṭawāf al-Wadā' ("farewell ṭawāf") is performed before leaving Mecca.
- Ṭawāf az-Zīyārah (ṭawāf of visiting), Ṭawāf al-'Ifāḍah (ṭawāf of compensation) or Ṭawāf al-Ḥajj (Hajj ṭawāf) is performed after completing the Hajj.

The Tawaf has its origins in the religion of the Najranite pagans, who walked around the Kaaba in an act of devotion to their creator god, Allah (not to be confused with the monotheistic god of Islam by the same name). This practice was adopted by Mohammad after some reform.

=== As the Qibla ===
The Qibla is the direction faced during prayer. The direction faced during prayer is the direction of the Kaaba, relative to the person praying. Apart from praying, Muslims generally consider facing the Qibla while reciting the Quran to be a part of good etiquette. Today, with the exception of certain heterodox groups stating that God cannot be assigned a place, such as the Druze, Nusayris, Alevis, and Nizari Ismailis, Muslims of all sects perform their prayers facing the Kaaba in Mecca. Historically, one major objection was the Qarmatians, a now-defunct syncretic Shia sect which rejected the Kaaba as the qibla; in 930, they sacked Mecca and for a time took the Kaaba's Black Stone to their centre of power in al-Ahsa, with the intention of starting a new era in Islam.

== Cleaning ==
The building is opened biannually for the ceremony of "The Cleaning of the Sacred Kaaba" (Arabic: تنظيف الكعبة المشرفة, romanized: Tanzif al-Ka'bat al-Musharrafah, lit. 'Cleaning of the Sacred Cube'). The ceremony takes place on the 1st of Sha'baan, the eighth month of the Islamic calendar, around thirty days before the start of the month of Ramadan and on the 15th of Muharram, the first month. The keys to the Kaaba are held by the Banī Shaybah (Arabic: بني شيبة) tribe, an honor bestowed upon them by Muhammad. Members of the tribe greet visitors to the inside of the Kaaba on the occasion of the cleaning ceremony.

The Governor of the Makkah Province and accompanying dignitaries clean the interior of the Kaaba using cloths dipped in Zamzam water scented with oud perfume. Preparations for the washing start a day before the agreed date, with the mixing of Zamzam water with several luxurious perfumes including Tayef rose, 'oud and musk. Zamzam water mixed with rose perfume is splashed on the floor and is wiped with palm leaves. Usually, the entire process is completed in two hours.

== Events related to the Kaaba ==
According to Shia Muslims, Ali ibn Abi Talib was born inside the Kaaba, though the majority of Sunni scholars reject this and maintain that Hakim ibn Hizam was the only person who was born inside the Kaaba.

== See also ==
- Glossary of Islam
- Outline of Islam
- Al-Masjid an-Nabawi
- Bayt al-Mawlid, the house where Muhammad is believed to have been born
- List of largest mosques
- List of mosques in Saudi Arabia
- Miscellaneous Symbols and Pictographs (Unicode block), which contains a pictogram for the Kaaba, U+1F54B 🕋 KAABA

== Bibliography ==
- Armstrong, Karen (1997). Jerusalem: One City, Three Faiths. HarperCollins. ISBN 9780345391681.
- Armstrong, Karen (2000). Islam: A Short History. Random House Publishing. ISBN 0-8129-6618-X.
- Atbuosh, Mohammed A. (2025). "South Arabian etymology for the Meccan Kaʿbah". Bulletin of the School of Oriental and African Studies. 88 (1). Cambridge University Press on behalf of SOAS University of London: 71–81. doi:10.1017/S0041977X24000429. ISSN 1474-0699.
- Crone, Patricia (2004) [1987]. Meccan Trade and the Rise of Islam (PDF). Piscataway, New Jersey: Gorgias. ISBN 1-59333-102-9.
- Daftary, Farhad (2007). The Isma'ilis: Their History and Doctrines. Cambridge: Cambridge University Press. ISBN 978-1-139-46578-6.
- Durand, Jean-Marie (2019). "Le Culte Des Bétyles Dans La Documentation Cunéiforme DʾÉpoque Amorrite" (PDF). In Römer, Thomas; Gonzalez, Hervé; Marti, Lionel (eds.). Représenter dieux et hommes dans le Proche-Orient ancien et dans la Bible. pp. 15–37.
- Finster, Barbara (2010). "Arabia in Late Antiquity: An Outline of the Cultural Situation in the Peninsula at the Time of Muhammad" (PDF). In Neuwirth, Angelika; Sinai, Nicolai; Marx, Michael (eds.). The Qur'an in Context. Historical and Literary Investigations into the Qur'anic Milieu. Brill. pp. 61–114.
- Hawting, G. R. (2003). "Kaʿba". Encyclopaedia of the Qurʾān. Vol. 3: J-O. pp. 75–80.
- Ibn Ishaq, Muhammad (1955). Sirat Rasul Allah [The Life of Muhammad]. Translated by Guillaume, Alfred. Oxford: Oxford University Press. ISBN 9780196360331 (reprint)
- Mohamed, Mamdouh N. (1996). Hajj to Umrah: From A to Z. Amana Publications. ISBN 0-915957-54-X.
- Mubarakpuri, Safiur Rahman (1976). Ar-Raheeq Al-Makhtum [The Sealed Nectar] (PDF) (in Arabic). Translated by Diab, Issam. Archived from the original (PDF) on 24 March 2018.
- Peterson, Andrew (1997). Dictionary of Islamic Architecture. London: Routledge.
- Robin, Christian J. (2015). "Ḥimyar, Aksūm, and Arabia Deserta in Late Antiquity. The Epigraphic Evidence". In Fisher, Greg (ed.). Arabs and Empires before Islam. Oxford University Press. pp. 127–171.
- von Grunebaum, G. E. (1970). Classical Islam: A History 600 A.D. to 1258 A.D.. Aldine Publishing Company. ISBN 978-0-202-30767-1.
- Webb, Peter (2023). "The Hajj Before Muhammad: The Early Evidence in Poetry and Hadith". Millennium. 20 (1): 33–63. doi:10.1515/mill-2023-0004. hdl:1887/3674390.
- Wensinck, A. J. & Jomier, J. (1978). "Ka'ba". In van Donzel, E.; Lewis, B.; Pellat, Ch. & Bosworth, C. E. (eds.). The Encyclopaedia of Islam, Second Edition. Volume IV: Iran–Kha. Leiden: E. J. Brill. pp. 317–322. ISBN 978-90-04-05745-6. OCLC 758278456.
- [1915] The Book of History, a History of All Nations From the Earliest Times to the Present, Viscount Bryce (Introduction), The Grolier Society.
