= Al-Azraqi =

9th-century Islamic commentator and historian

Muhammad ibn 'Abd Allah Al-Azraqi
- Born: 9th century Mecca, Abbasid Caliphate
- Died: 9th century Mecca, Abbasid Caliphate
- Occupations: Historian, Islamic commentator

Academic work
- Era: Islamic Golden Age
- Main interests: History of Mecca, Islamic history
- Notable works: Kitab Akhbar Makka (Book of Reports about Mecca)
- Notable ideas: Detailed accounts of the pre-Islamic and early Islamic Ka'aba

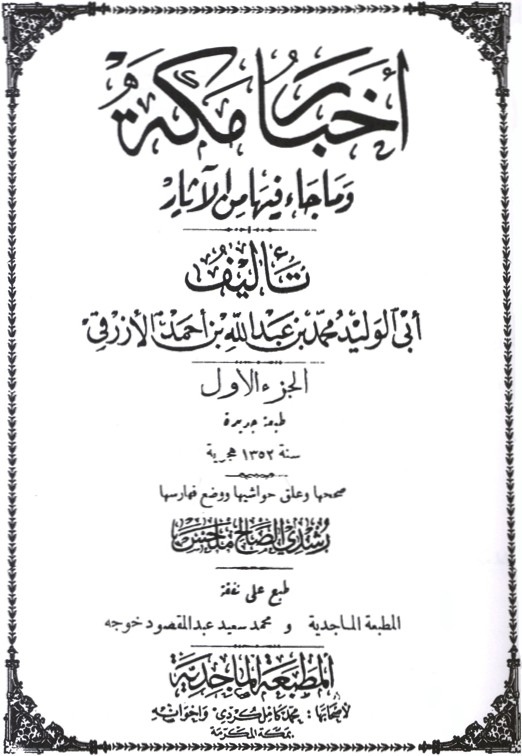
كتاب أخبار مكة, Al-Azraqi's Book of Reports

Muhammad ibn 'Abd Allah Al-Azraqi (Arabic: محمد بن عبد الله الأزرقي) was a 9th-century Islamic commentator and historian, and author of the Book of Reports about Mecca (Kitab Akhbar Makka).

Al-Azraqi was from a family who lived in Mecca for hundreds of years. He gave information on the design and layout of the pre-Islamic Ka'aba at Mecca after its rebuilding following a fire in 603 AD until its possession by Muhammad in 630 AD. The contents included a statue of Hubal, the principal male deity of Mecca, and a number of other pagan items, which were destroyed in 630 as idolatrous. They also included a pair of ram’s horns said to have belonged to the ram sacrificed by Abraham in place of his son, Ismail, and a painting (probably a fresco) of Jesus and Mary. According to one report in his work, Muhammad spared these items, which survived until the destruction by the Umayyads in 683. Al-Azraqi is silent on the fate of the images of trees that are known also to have decorated the interior of the Ka'aba, pictures of which formed part of the mosaic decoration on the walls of al-Qalis Church, Sanaa, and were later to emerge in the Umayyad mosaics in the Dome of the Rock, the Prophet's Mosque in Medina, and the Great Mosque of Damascus.

The key manuscript of Akhbar Makka is Leiden, University Library, Or.424. The only printed edition is volume one of Die Chroniken der Stadt Mekka, ed. by Ferdinand Wüstenfeld, 4 vols (Leipzig 1858-61), vol. 1, vol. 2, vol. 3, vol. 4.
