= Hajj certificates =

Documents attesting completion of the Hajj

Hajj certificates are documents attesting that a person has completed the Hajj, the Islamic pilgrimage to Mecca. They have served both as testimony of the performance of pilgrimage rites and as personal or family mementos. The tradition is known from the 5th century AH/11th century CE and continued in manuscript and printed forms into the modern period. Their contents and decoration vary by period and place, ranging from text-only attestations to illustrated scrolls showing pilgrimage routes and holy sites.

== History ==
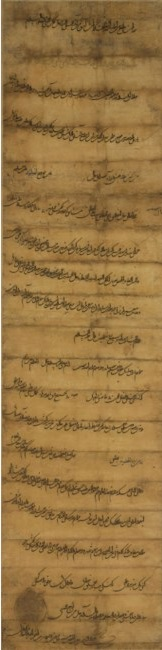
A text-only pilgrimage attestation from Safavid Iran

Hajj certificates formed part of a broader Islamic practice of recording and commemorating pilgrimage. Historical examples were written on paper, parchment or fabric, and some were kept or displayed in homes, mosques and madrasas as reminders of the holy sites of Islam. Qatar National Library describes a certificate dated 1690 as certifying its owner's visits to holy sites and identifying the pilgrim as a hat-maker from Mashhad, Iran.

The production and circulation of certificates expanded in later centuries. By the early 20th century, colourful lithographed certificates had become popular, and some examples combined depictions of the holy shrines in Mecca, Medina and Jerusalem. The growth of printed certificates was associated with publishing houses in Mecca, Medina and Cairo, reflecting their wider commercial production and circulation among pilgrims.

== Form and contents ==
Hajj certificates were commonly made on paper and could be embellished with coloured inks, watercolours, gold, silver and calligraphy. Many examples include the pilgrim's name, place of origin and a record of the rites or sites visited during the pilgrimage. Some certificates are primarily textual, while others contain extensive illustrations.

Illustrated certificates often depict the journey to Mecca and the holy places visited by pilgrims, including the Kaaba, the Masjid al-Haram and the Prophet's Mosque in Medina. In some examples, the Kaaba and the surrounding mosque are shown from a two-dimensional or bird's-eye perspective, with the Kaaba placed at the centre of the composition and shown with details such as the Black Stone and its door. Some certificates also include sites associated with Shia devotion in addition to the principal Hajj locations.

== Proxy pilgrimage certificates ==
Some certificates record a pilgrimage performed by proxy. In such cases, a person who had already completed the Hajj could perform it on behalf of another person who was unable to undertake the journey, and the certificate would state that the pilgrimage had been completed for that person. Examples include certificates issued for individuals who commissioned another pilgrim to perform the Hajj on their behalf.

== Modern certificates ==
The use of Hajj certificates has continued in modern forms, including digital certificates. In 2023, Gulf News reported that Saudi Arabia's Ministry of Hajj and Umrah allowed pilgrims to obtain Hajj completion certificates online through the Nusuk application, with users able to select a certificate design through the app.

== Examples ==
Historical pilgrimage certificates

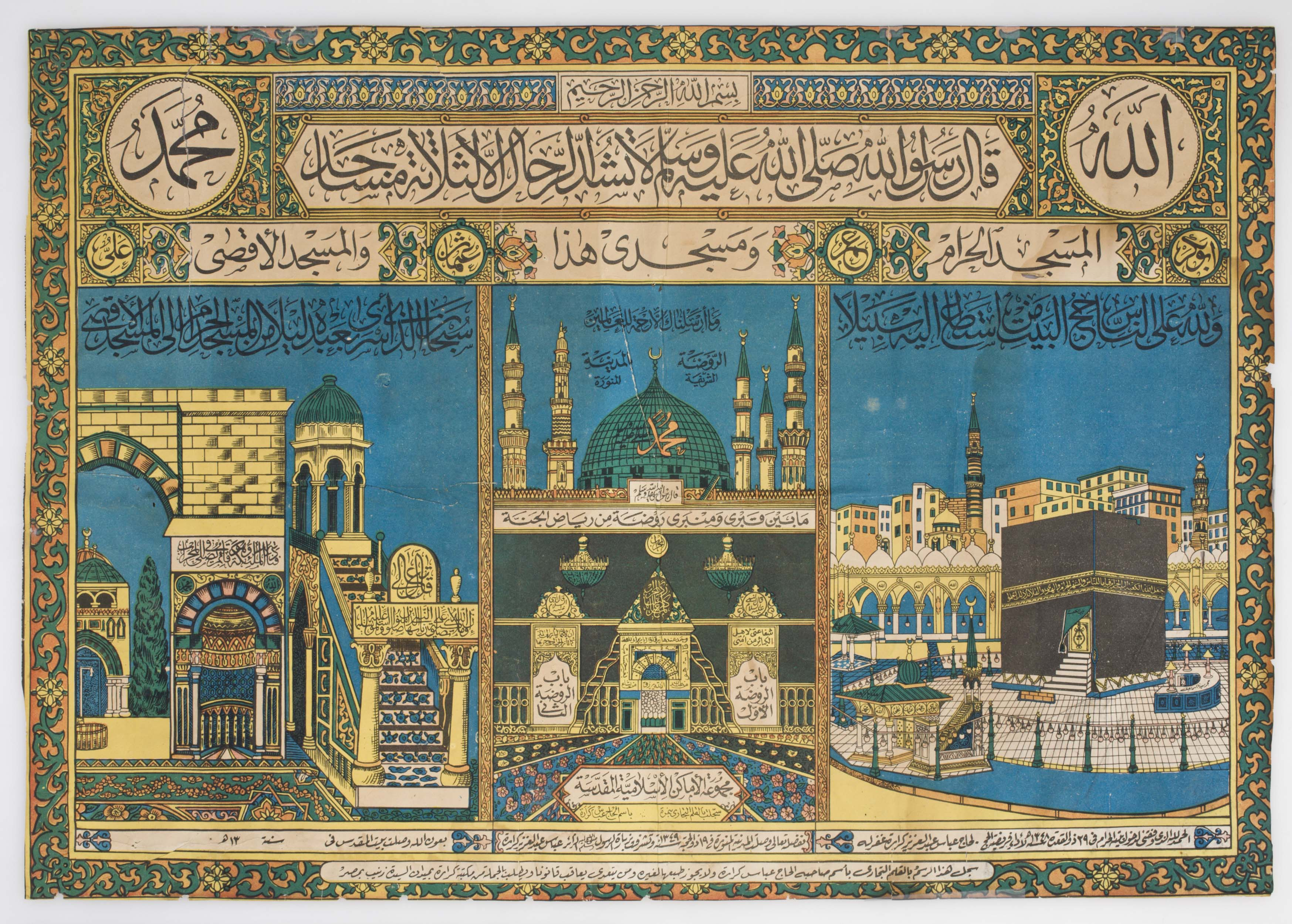
A blue and gold Hajj certificate

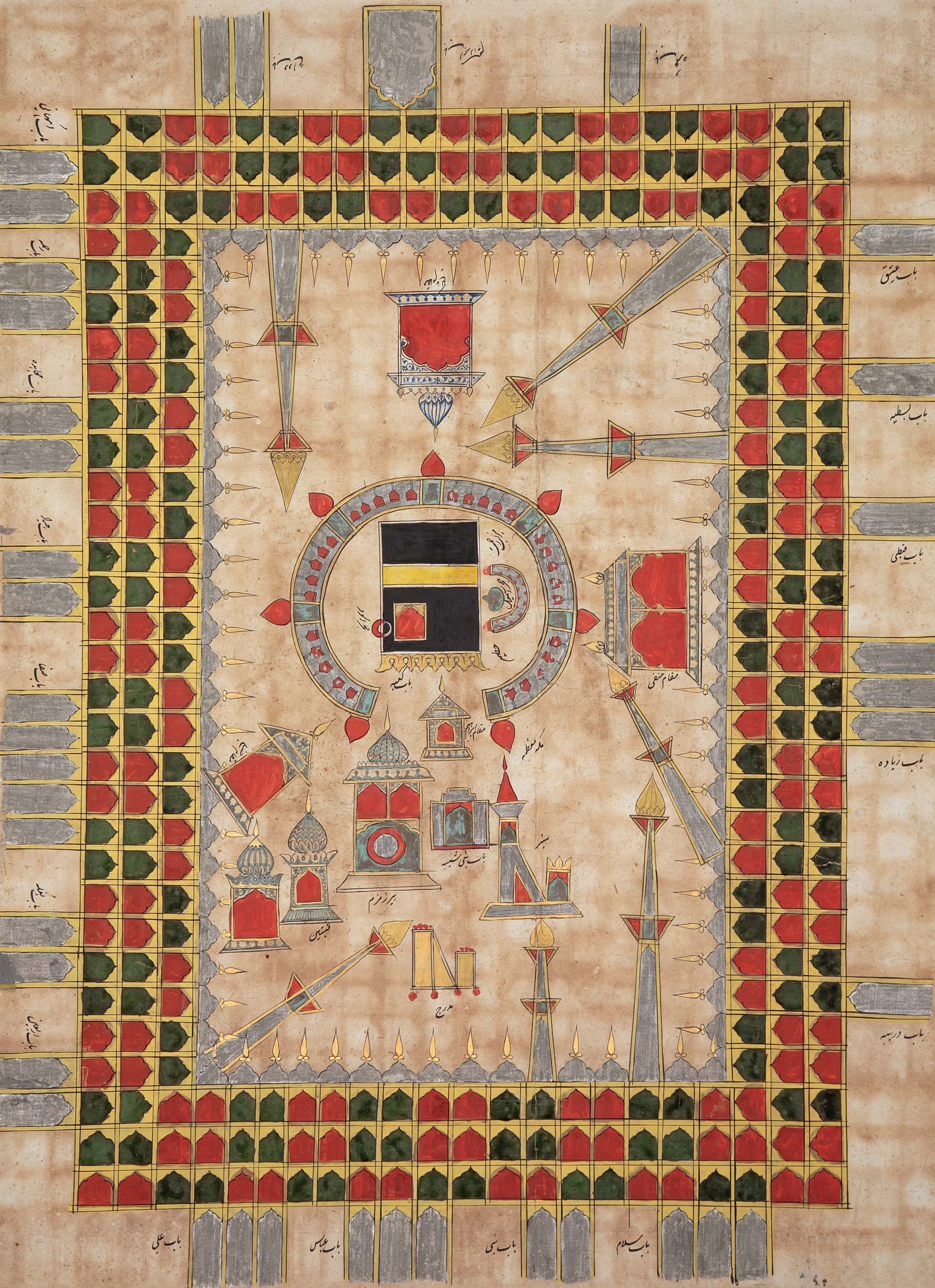
A Hajj certificate from the 17th or 18th century, created at Mecca
