= Create (charity) =

- Formation: July 7, 2003; 23 years ago
- Founded: July 7, 2003
- Type: Not-for-profit
- Purpose: Young hospital patients; disabled children and adults; young and adult carers; schoolchildren (and their teachers) in areas of deprivation; vulnerable older people; young and adult prisoners (and their families); and marginalised children and adults
- Headquarters: City of London, London, United Kingdom
- Region served: UK
- Key people: Nicky Goulder MBE, Founding Chief Executive
- Revenue: £1,058,636
- Website: www.createarts.org.uk

Create is a UK creative arts charity (registered charity number 1099733) based in London and Manchester, which offers creative workshops and arts experiences led by professional artists in community settings, schools, day centres, prisons and hospitals.

The charity works with eight priority groups: children in care and care leavers; disabled children and adults; schoolchildren (and their teachers) in areas of deprivation; vulnerable older people; young and adult carers; young and adult prisoners; oung patients; other marginalised children and adults (including LGBTQ+ young people, homeless people, refugees and asylum seekers, survivors of modern slavery).

Patrons include: choreographer/director Sir Matthew Bourne OBE, writer Esther Freud, musician Dame Evelyn Glennie, composer/TV presenter Howard Goodall CBE, Royal Academician Ken Howard OBE, writer/ex-prisoner Erwin James, choreographer Shobana Jeyasingh CBE, pianist Nicholas McCarthy, writer/broadcaster/art historian Tim Marlow OBE, and writer/actress/comedian Isy Suttie.

== History ==
Create was founded on 7 July 2003 from the dining room table of Chief Executive, Nicky Goulder MBE, with the aim of empowering lives through the creative arts. Prior to this, Nicky was Chief Executive of the Orchestra of St John's. In 2013, Nicky won the Clarins Most Dynamisante Woman of the Year Award, which recognises "the action and commitment of inspirational British women who work tirelessly to help underprivileged or sick children across the globe."

Create has won more than 115 awards since 2012, including Charity Times's "Charity of the Year: with an income of less than £1 million" in 2020, and "Digital Transformation of the Year" in 2021.

In 2021/22, Create ran 981 workshops, delivering 13,439 contact hours with 1,367 disadvantaged and vulnerable children and adults.

Since 2003, Create has run 12,057 workshops, delivering 330,943 contact hours with more than 41,500 participants. Projects have been delivered across England, Scotland and Wales. Projects connect, empower, inspire and upskill participants, raising aspirations, reducing isolation and enhancing wellbeing. Each is rigorously evaluated to assess impact.

== Selection of Projects ==
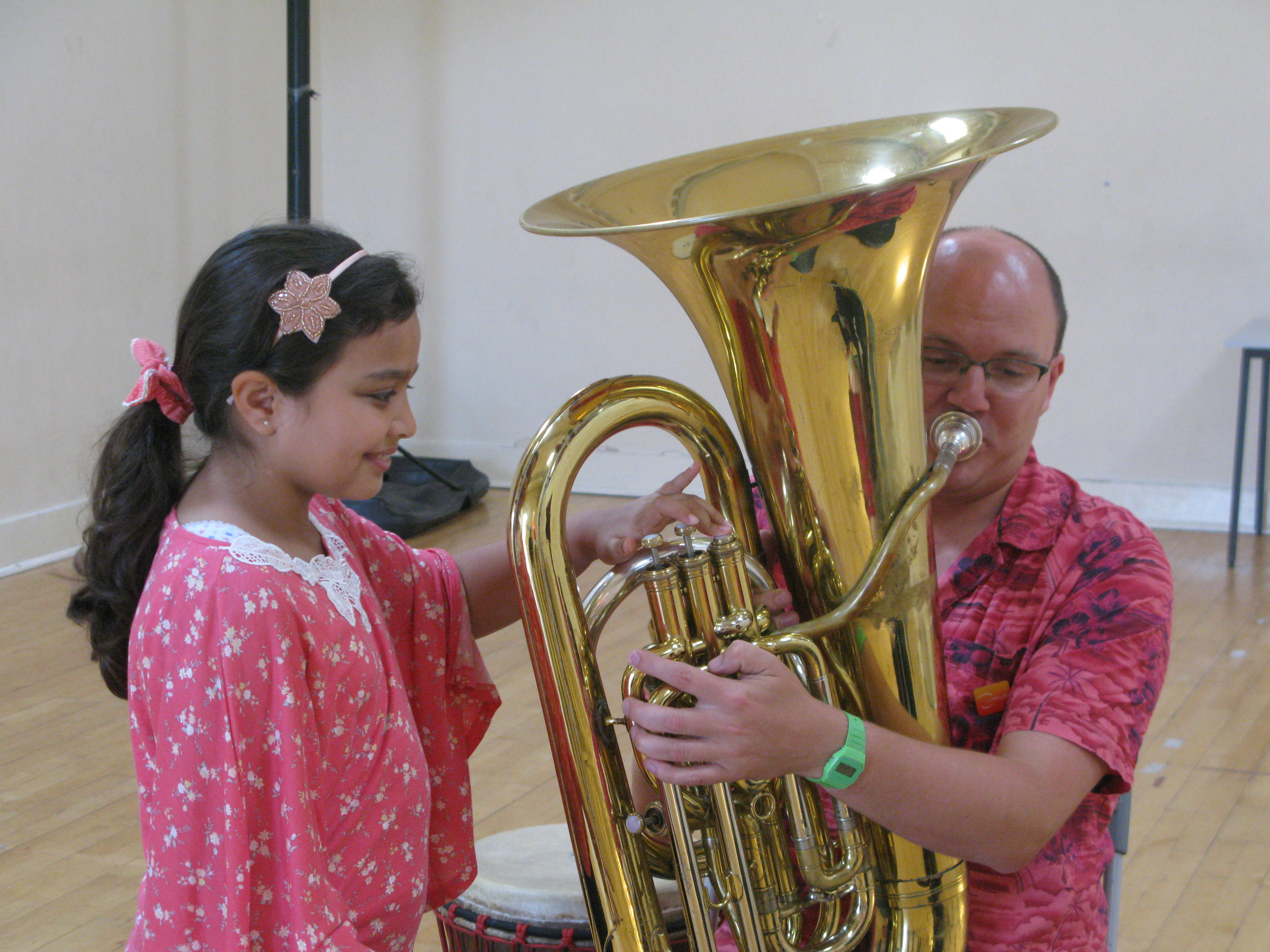
A young carer explores musical instruments at an inspired:arts workshop

- art:links is a cross-arts project which brings together vulnerable older people in day centres and care homes for friendship, self-expression and creative release, reducing isolation.
- art:space and inspired:arts use film-making, photography, music, drama, creative writing and visual art to enable young carers to take time away from their caring responsibilities.
- change:matters educates and upskills young carers across the UK on the topic of money and family finances through the creative arts.
- creative:connection tackles disability prejudice, bringing disabled and non-disabled young people together to make visual art, music, film and more.
- Inside Stories enables prisoners to write, record, illustrate and set to music their own stories for their children, while My Dad's In Prison gives prisoners a chance to write a children's book that promotes understanding of having a parent in prison.

== Awards ==
- Winner: 104 Koestler Awards since 2012
- Winner: Charity Times Awards 2021 ~ Digital Transformation of the Year
- Winner: Charity Times Awards 2020 ~ Charity of the Year: with an income of less than £1 million
- Winner: Legal Week CSR Innovation (Collaboration) (Ashurst/Create) 2020
- Winner: Children & Young People Now 2019 ~ Young Carers Award
- Winner: Charity Awards 2017 ~ Arts, Culture and Heritage Award
- Winner: East End Community Foundation ~ Smooth Sailing Award 2017
- Winner: Foundation for Social Improvement ~ Small Charity Big Impact Award 2017
- Highly Commended: Children and Young People Now 2017 ~ Young Carers Award
- Highly Commended: Children and Young People Now 2017 ~ Youth Justice Award
- Highly Commended: Children and Young People Now 2017 ~ Youth Work Award
- Winner: Children and Young People Now 2016 ~ Arts and Culture Award
- Winner: Creative Vision Award 2016
- Winner: Charity Times Awards 2015 ~ PR Team of the Year: with an income of less than £1 million
- Special Commendation: Royal Society for Public Health's Arts and Health Awards for Inside Stories (2013)
- Winner: Business in the Community's South East Local Impact Award for art:space presented to sponsor British Land (2013)
- The Lord Mayor's Dragon Award for Social Inclusion for creative:u~turn presented to sponsor Reed Smith (2012)
