= Exist =

Exist or exists may refer to:

- Existence
- eXist, an open source database management system built on XML
- Existential quantification, in logic and mathematics (symbolized by ∃, read "exists")
  - &exist; (or &Exists;), the HTML code for the existential quantifier symbol
- Energetic X-ray Survey Telescope, a proposed hard X-ray imaging all-sky deep survey mission
- Exist (album), a studio album by Exo
- Exi(s)t, a studio album by Reflections
- Exist!, a studio album by Alexandros
- Exists (band), formerly Exist, a Malaysian band
- Exists (film), a 2014 horror film
- XIST (gene) X inactive specific transcript, a gene which inactivates extra copies of X-chromosomes.

== See also ==
- Existentialism
- Existence (disambiguation), for other meanings of "existence" and "existential"
- Exit (disambiguation)
- XIST
