= Children & Young People Now =

- Editor: Derren Hayes
- Frequency: Fortnightly
- Circulation: 18,000 (2008)
- First issue: September 2007
- Company: MA Business & Leisure
- Country: United Kingdom
- Based in: London
- Language: English
- Website: www.cypnow.co.uk
- ISSN: 1755-8093

Children & Young People Now is a magazine and website resource covering policy issues and best practice for all professionals working to improve the life chances of children, young people and families in the United Kingdom.

Launched in 2007, Children & Young People Now is the result of the merging of Children Now, which was produced in association with the National Children's Bureau, and sister magazine Young People Now.

The title also runs a number of conferences as well as the annual Children & Young People Now Awards, which recognise and reward individuals and teams across 23 categories.

The editor of Children & Young People Now is Derren Hayes.

The magazine and associated websites were acquired in October 2011 by the Mark Allen Group from the previous owner Haymarket Media Business.
