= Creation of the world =

Creation of the world may refer to:

- Formation and evolution of the Solar System
- Cosmogony, any theory about the creation of the universe
- Creation myth, any symbolic narrative of how the earth or the universe came to exist
- Genesis creation narrative, the creation myth of Judaism and Christianity
- Creation of the World (Raphael), a 1516 mosaic
- The Creation of the World and Other Business, a 1972 play by Arthur Miller
- La création du monde, a 1923 ballet composed by Darius Milhaud

== See also ==
- Earth's Creation, a 1994 painting by Emily Kame Kngwarreye
- The Creation of the Universe, a 2008 album by Metal Machine Trio
- Creation (disambiguation)
