= Existence (disambiguation) =

Existence is a philosophical concept in metaphysics and ontology.

Existence may also refer to:

- Existence (Dark Suns album)
- Existence (Beto Vázquez Infinity album)
- "Existence" (The X-Files), a 2001 television episode
- eXistenZ, a 1999 horror science-fiction film
- The Existence, a 2004 EP release by Forever Changed
- Existence, a novel by David Brin
- The 14, a 1973 British film also released as Existence and The Wild Little Bunch
- Existence, a music project founded by Margot Reisinger

Existential can mean "relating to existence" or "relating to existentialism". It is used in particular to refer to:

- Existential quantification, in logic and mathematics (symbolized by ∃)
- Existential clause, in linguistics
- Existential crisis
- Existential fallacy
- Existential humanism
- Existential forgery
- Existential risk
- Existential therapy
- Existential graph
- Existential phenomenology

== See also ==
- Exist (disambiguation)
