= Creativity (disambiguation) =

Creativity refers to the invention or origination of any new thing (a product, solution, artwork, literary work, joke, etc.) that has value.

Creativity may also refer to:

- Creativity (magazine)
- Creativity (process philosophy)
- Creativity (religion), a white-separatist organization
  - Creativity Alliance
  - Creativity Movement
- Creativity, Action, Service, an educational programme
- Creativity techniques
- Creative Technology, a computer products manufacturer
- "Creativity" (Don't Hug Me I'm Scared), an episode of Don't Hug Me I'm Scared
