= List of Wishbone Ash members =

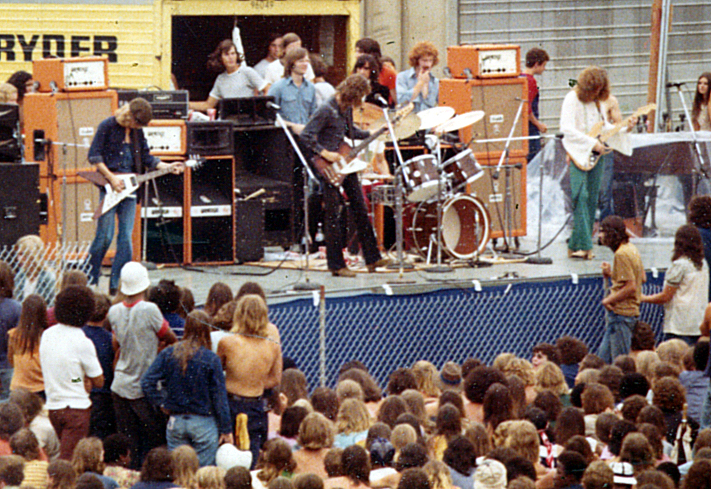
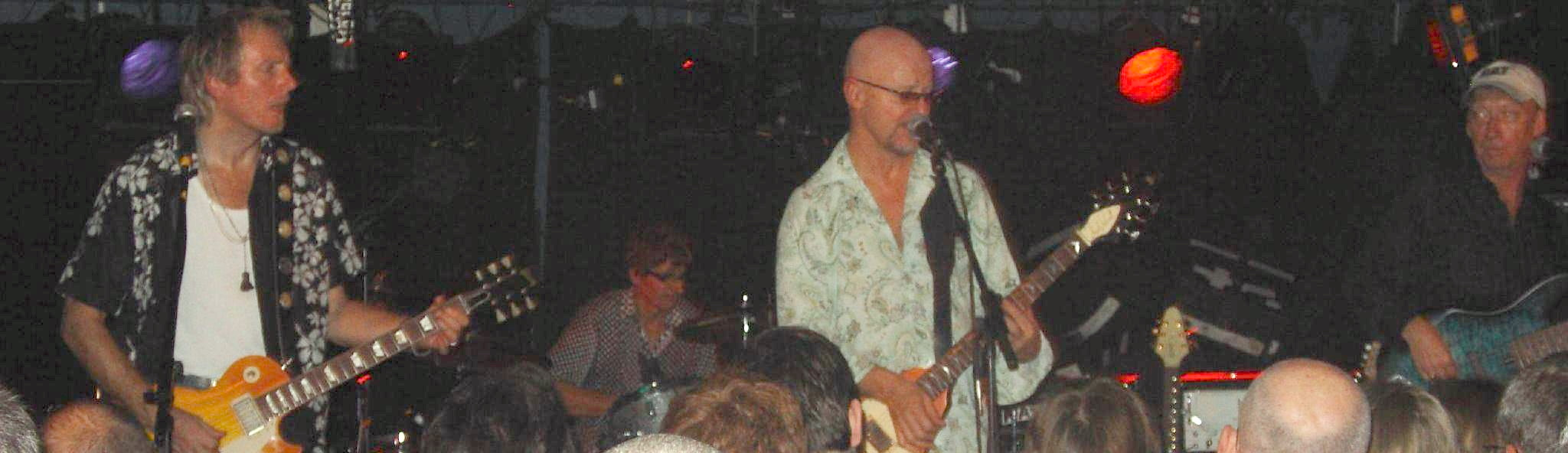
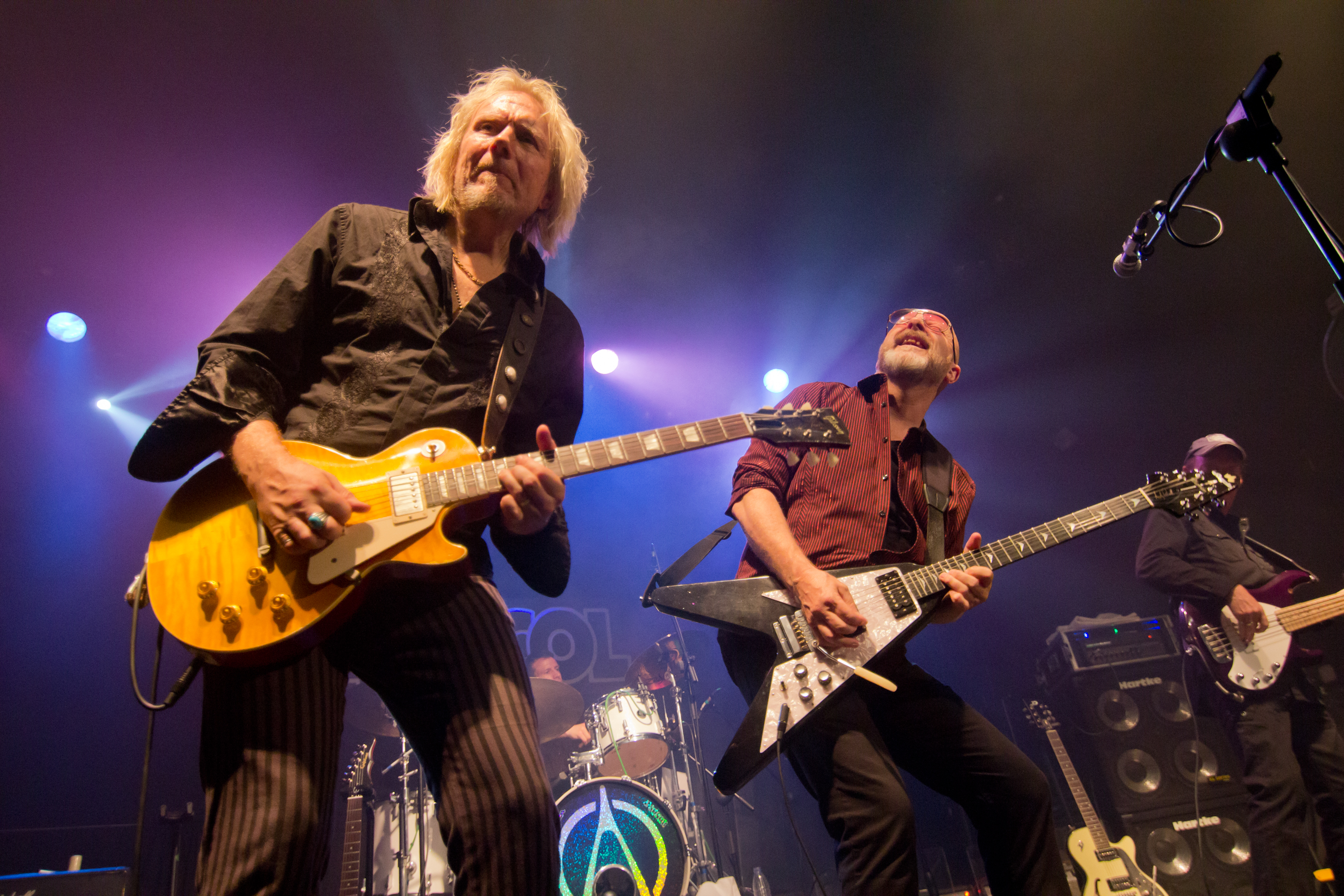
Three lineups of Wishbone Ash in 1972 (top), 2006 (middle) and 2015 (bottom).

Wishbone Ash are an English hard rock band from Torquay, Devon. Formed in October 1969, the group originally included bassist and lead vocalist Martin Turner, guitarists and vocalists Andy Powell and Ted Turner, and drummer Steve Upton. The band currently consists of Powell, alongside bassist Bob Skeat (since 1997), guitarist Mark Abrahams (since 2017) and drummer Windsor McGilvary (since 2026).

== History ==
Their first lineup change came in the spring of 1974, when Ted Turner was replaced by former Home guitarist Laurie Wisefield. Martin Turner had also left by 1980, with John Wetton replacing him for the 1981 album Number the Brave. After Wetton left to form Asia in early 1981, Trevor Bolder joined Wishbone Ash and remained until 1983, when he returned to his previous band Uriah Heep. Bolder was replaced by former Trapeze bassist and vocalist Mervyn Spence. Wisefield was replaced by Jamie Crompton in late 1985, and Andy Pyle replaced Spence in 1986.

In 1987, Martin and Ted Turner returned as part of an original lineup reformation for former manager Miles Copeland's I.R.S. No Speak instrumental album series, to which they contributed Nouveau Calls at the end of the year. Powell was left as the sole remaining constant member of Wishbone Ash by mid-1990, when Upton left the group and retired from the music business. He was replaced briefly by Robbie France and later in the year by Ray Weston, both of whom featured on the 1991 release Strange Affair. Shortly after the album's release, Martin Turner was fired from the group on 1 October 1991, with Pyle returning to take his place. Ted Turner was the final original member of the band to leave in early 1994, with bassist Pyle and drummer Weston following him in leaving the group shortly after.

Powell rebuilt the band with the addition of guitarist Roger Filgate, bassist Tony Kishman and drummer Mike Sturgis. Martin Turner briefly returned for the group's 25th anniversary tour in 1995 and began working on new material, before leaving for a third and final time. After the release and touring of Illuminations, Filgate, Kishman and Sturgis were replaced by Mark Birch, Bob Skeat and Weston, respectively. Birch remained until 2001, when he was replaced by Finnish guitarist Ben Granfelt. After the studio album Bona Fide and live release Almighty Blues: London & Beyond, Granfelt left in 2004 after playing his final show on 30 October. He was replaced by another Finnish guitarist, Jyrki "Muddy" Manninen. Long-term drummer Weston left for a second time in early 2007 due to tiring of touring, with Joe Crabtree taking his place. on 9 May 2017, when Mark Abrahams replaced Manninen as their ninth guitarist. In 2022 Crabtree left the band and was replaced by Mike Truscott.

== Members ==
=== Current ===
Image	Name	Years active	Instruments	Release contributions
	Andy Powell	1969–present	guitar; vocals; mandolin	all Wishbone Ash releases
	Bob Skeat	1997–present	bass; backing vocals; occasional keyboards	all Wishbone Ash releases from Trance Visionary (1997) onwards
	Mark Abrahams	2017–present	guitar	Coat of Arms (2020)
	Windsor McGilvary	2026–present	drums; backing vocals; percussion	None

=== Former ===
Image	Name	Years active	Instruments	Release contributions
	Steve Upton	1969–1990	drums; percussion	all Wishbone Ash releases from Wishbone Ash (1970) to Here to Hear (1989)
	Martin Turner	1969–1980; 1987–1991; 1995–1996	bass; vocals; keyboards	all Wishbone Ash releases from Wishbone Ash (1970) to Live Dates 2 (1980); Hot Ash Live (1981); Nouveau Calls (1987); Here to Hear (1989); Strange Affair (1991)
	Ted Turner	1969–1974; 1987–1993	guitar; vocals; banjo	all Wishbone Ash releases from Wishbone Ash (1970) to Live Dates (1973), and from Nouveau Calls (1987) to Live in Chicago (1992)
	Laurie Wisefield	1974–1985	guitar; vocals; banjo	all Wishbone Ash releases from There's the Rub (1974) to Raw to the Bone (1985)
	John Wetton	1980–1981 (died 2017)	bass; vocals; keyboards	Number the Brave (1981)
	Trevor Bolder	1981–1983 (died 2013)	bass; vocals	Twin Barrels Burning (1982)
	Mervyn Spence	1983–1986	bass; vocals	Raw to the Bone (1985)
	Jamie Crompton	1985–1987; 1988 (touring)	guitar; backing vocals	none
	Andy Pyle	1986–1987; 1991–1994	bass; vocals	Live in Chicago (1992)
	Robbie France	1990 (died 2012)	drums	Strange Affair (1991)
	Ray Weston	1990–1994; 1997–2007	drums; percussion	Strange Affair (1991); Live in Chicago (1992); all Wishbone Ash releases from Trance Visionary (1997) to Live in Hamburg (2007)
	Roger Filgate	1994–1997	guitar; backing vocals; bass; keyboards (studio)	Live in Geneva (1995); Illuminations (1996)
	Mike Sturgis	1994–1997	drums	Live in Geneva (1995); Illuminations (1996)
	Tony Kishman	1994–1995; 1996–1997	bass; vocals	Live in Geneva (1995); Illuminations (1996)
	Mark Birch	1997–2001	guitar; vocals	all Wishbone Ash releases from Trance Visionary (1997) to Live Dates 3 (2001)
	Ben Granfelt	2001–2004	guitar; vocals	Bona Fide (2002); Almighty Blues: London & Beyond (2004)
	Muddy Manninen	2004–2017	guitar; vocals	all Wishbone Ash releases from Live on XM Satellite Radio (2005) to Live at Metropolis 16/05/15 (2015)
	Joe Crabtree	2007–2022	drums; percussion; backing vocals	all Wishbone Ash releases from The Power of Eternity (2007) to Coat of Arms (2020)
	Mike Truscott	2022–2025	drums; percussion	Live Dates Live (2023); Live in Cologne (2025)

== Lineups ==
Period	Members	Releases
October 1969 – June 1974	Martin Turner – vocals, bass; Andy Powell – guitar, vocals; Ted Turner – guitar, vocals; Steve Upton – drums, percussion	Wishbone Ash (1970); Pilgrimage (1971); Argus (1972); Live from Memphis (1972); Wishbone Four (1973); Live Dates (1973); First Light (2007)
June 1974 – November 1980	Martin Turner – vocals, bass; Andy Powell – guitar, vocals; Laurie Wisefield – guitar, vocals; Steve Upton – drums, percussion	There's the Rub (1974); Locked In (1976); New England (1976); Front Page News (1977); No Smoke Without Fire (1978); Live in Tokyo (1979); Just Testing (1980); Live Dates 2 (1980)
November 1980 – April 1981	Andy Powell – guitar, vocals; Laurie Wisefield – guitar, vocals; John Wetton – bass, keyboards, vocals; Steve Upton – drums, percussion	Number the Brave (1981)
April 1981 – April 1983	Andy Powell – guitar, vocals; Laurie Wisefield – guitar, vocals; Trevor Bolder – bass, vocals; Steve Upton – drums, percussion	Twin Barrels Burning (1982)
April 1983 – December 1985	Mervyn Spence – vocals, bass; Andy Powell – guitar, vocals; Laurie Wisefield – guitar, vocals; Steve Upton – drums, percussion	Raw to the Bone (1985)
December 1985 – February 1986	Mervyn Spence – vocals, bass; Andy Powell – guitar, vocals; Jamie Crompton – guitar, backing vocals; Steve Upton – drums, percussion	none
February 1986 – July 1987	Andy Powell – guitar, vocals; Jamie Crompton – guitar, backing vocals; Andy Pyle – bass; Steve Upton – drums, percussion	none
July 1987 – July 1990	Martin Turner – vocals, bass, keyboards; Andy Powell – guitar, vocals; Ted Turner – guitar, vocals; Steve Upton – drums, percussion	Nouveau Calls (1987); Here to Hear (1989)
July – November 1990	Martin Turner – vocals, bass, keyboards; Andy Powell – guitar, vocals; Ted Turner – guitar, vocals; Robbie France – drums	Strange Affair (1991) – three tracks
November 1990 – October 1991	Martin Turner – vocals, bass, keyboards; Andy Powell – guitar, vocals; Ted Turner – guitar, vocals; Ray Weston – drums, percussion	Strange Affair (1991)
October 1991 – January 1994	Andy Powell – guitar, vocals; Ted Turner – guitar, vocals; Andy Pyle – bass; Ray Weston – drums, percussion	The Ash Live in Chicago (1992)
Early 1994 – October 1995	Tony Kishman – vocals, bass; Andy Powell – guitar, vocals; Roger Filgate – guitar; Mike Sturgis – drums	Live in Geneva (1995)
October 1995 – January 1996	Martin Turner – vocals, bass; Andy Powell – guitar, vocals; Roger Filgate – guitar; Mike Sturgis – drums	none
January 1996 – 1997	Tony Kishman – vocals, bass; Andy Powell – guitar, vocals; Roger Filgate – guitar; Mike Sturgis – drums	Illuminations (1996)
1997 – May 2001	Andy Powell – guitar, vocals; Mark Birch – guitar, vocals; Bob Skeat – bass, backing vocals; Ray Weston – drums, percussion	Trance Visionary (1998); Psychic Terrorism (1998); Bare Bones (1999); Live Dates 3 (2000)
May 2001 – October 2004	Andy Powell – guitar, vocals; Ben Granfelt – guitar, vocals; Bob Skeat – bass, backing vocals; Ray Weston – drums, percussion	Bona Fide (2002); Almighty Blues: London & Beyond (2004)
October 2004 – April 2007	Andy Powell – guitar, vocals; Muddy Manninen – guitar, backing vocals; Bob Skeat – bass, backing vocals; Ray Weston – drums, percussion	Live on XM Satellite Radio (2005); Clan Destiny (2006); Live in Hamburg (2007)
April 2007 – May 2017	Andy Powell – guitar, vocals; Muddy Manninen – guitar, vocals; Bob Skeat – bass, backing vocals; Joe Crabtree – drums, percussion	Power of Eternity (2007); Argus "Then Again" Live (2008); Elegant Stealth (2011); Blue Horizon (2014)
May 2017 – February 2022	Andy Powell – guitar, vocals; Mark Abrahams – guitar; Bob Skeat – bass, backing vocals; Joe Crabtree – drums, percussion	Coat of Arms (2020)
February 2022 – December 2025	Andy Powell – guitar, vocals; Mark Abrahams – guitar; Bob Skeat – bass, backing vocals; Mike Truscott – drums, percussion	Live Dates Live: 1973-2023 (2023); Live in Cologne (2025)
January 2026 – present	Andy Powell – guitar, vocals; Mark Abrahams – guitar; Bob Skeat – bass, backing vocals; Windsor McGilvary – drums, backing vocals, percussion	None to date
