= Wishbone Ash discography =

- Studio albums: 24
- Live albums: 12
- Compilation albums: 10
- Tribute albums: 2
- Singles: 20

This is the complete discography of the rock band Wishbone Ash. Over the years they have released 24 studio albums, 12 live albums, 10 compilation albums and 20 singles. No single reached the UK charts.

== Albums ==
=== Studio albums ===
| Year | Title | Peak chart positions | | | | | Certifications |
| Year | Title | US | UK | GE | AUS | CAN | Certifications |
|---|---|---|---|---|---|---|---|
| 1970 | Wishbone Ash | - | 29 | - | - | - | - |
| 1971 | Pilgrimage | 174 | 14 | - | - | - | - |
| 1972 | Argus | 169 | 3 | - | 49 | - | BPI: Gold |
| 1973 | Wishbone Four | 44 | 12 | - | 44 | 41 | - |
| 1974 | There's the Rub | 88 | 16 | 43 | 67 | 100 | BPI: Silver |
| 1976 | Locked In | 136 | 36 | - | - | - | - |
| 1976 | New England | 154 | 22 | 35 | - | - | - |
| 1977 | Front Page News | 166 | 31 | - | - | - | - |
| 1978 | No Smoke Without Fire | - | 43 | - | - | - | - |
| 1980 | Just Testing | 179 | 41 | 51 | - | - | - |
| 1981 | Number the Brave | - | 61 | - | - | - | - |
| 1982 | Twin Barrels Burning | - | 22 | - | - | - | - |
| 1985 | Raw to the Bone | - | - | - | - | - | - |
| 1987 | Nouveau Calls | - | - | - | - | - | - |
| 1989 | Here to Hear | - | - | - | - | - | - |
| 1991 | Strange Affair | - | - | - | - | - | - |
| 1996 | Illuminations | - | - | - | - | - | - |
| 1998 | Trance Visionary (Electronic) | - | - | - | - | - | - |
| 1998 | Psychic Terrorism (Electronic) | - | - | - | - | - | - |
| 1999 | Bare Bones (Acoustic versions) | - | - | - | - | - | - |
| 2002 | Bona Fide | - | - | - | - | - | - |
| 2006 | Clan Destiny | - | - | - | - | - | - |
| 2007 | The Power of Eternity | - | - | - | - | - | - |
| 2011 | Elegant Stealth | - | - | - | - | - | - |
| 2014 | Blue Horizon | - | - | 74 | - | - | - |
| 2020 | Coat of Arms | - | - | 22 | - | - | - |

=== Other albums ===
| Year | Title |
|---|---|
| 2007 | First Light (archival recording prior to recording of debut album) |

=== Live albums ===
| Year | Title | Peak chart positions | | | Certifications |
| Year | Title | US | UK | CAN | Certifications |
|---|---|---|---|---|---|
| 1972 | Live from Memphis live 1972 | - | - | - | - |
| 1973 | Live Dates (Recorded in June 1973 (Croydon, Newcastle, Reading and Portsmouth)) | 82 | - | 86 | BPI: Silver |
| 1979 | Live in Tokyo (Recorded live in Tokyo on 10 and 15 November 1978) | - | - | - | - |
| 1980 | Live Dates 2 | - | 40 | - | - |
| 1981 | Hot Ash (Recorded In England 1980) | 192 | - | - | - |
| 1991 | BBC Radio 1 Live in Concert (Recorded for the BBC at the Paris Theatre 25 May 1972) | - | - | - | - |
| 1992 | The Ash Live in Chicago (Recorded by Metromobile on January 24 & 25 1992 at Easy Street, Glenview, Chicago, Illinois) | - | - | - | - |
| 1995 | Live at the BBC | | | | |
| 1996 | Live in Geneva (Recorded at the Rock Heroes Festival, Geneva, 1995) | - | - | - | - |
| 1997 | Wishbone Ash on Air (BBC Radio 1 and Old Grey Whistle Test recordings 1971, 1972, 1977) | - | - | - | - |
| 1997 | Live - Timeline | - | - | - | - |
| 1999 | The King Will Come - Live | - | - | - | - |
| 2001 | Live Dates 3 (Recorded at Le Plan, Ris Orangis - Paris, France on October 22, 1999) | - | - | - | - |
| 2002 | Live in Bristol | - | - | - | - |
| 2002 | Tracks | - | - | - | - |
| 2003 | Tracks 2 | - | - | - | - |
| 2003 | Almighty Blues: London and Beyond | - | - | - | - |
| 2004 | Time Was... The Live Anthology (Re-packaging of Live -Timeline and The King Will Come - Live) | - | - | - | - |
| 2005 | Live on XM Satellite Radio (Recorded on November 22, 2004) | - | - | - | - |
| 2007 | Tracks 3 | - | - | - | - |
| 2008 | Live in Hamburg (Recorded Live in Hamburg, Germany on 23.01.2007) | - | - | - | - |
| 2008 | Argus "Then Again" Live (Recorded live on May 6, 2008, before a studio audience at the XM Satellite Radio Studios in Washington DC) | - | - | - | - |
| 2009 | 40 Live in London (Recorded at Shepherd's Bush Empire, London, June 2009) | - | - | - | - |
| 2010 | Road Works, Vol. 1: Live at the Grand | - | - | - | - |
| 2012 | Road Works, Vol. 2: Live in Hamburg | - | - | - | - |
| 2013 | Road Works, Vol. 3: Live in Germany | - | - | - | - |
| 2014 | Road Works, Vol. 4: Live at Ashcon '14 | - | - | - | - |
| 2015 | Live at the Metropolis | - | - | - | - |
| 2017 | Raw to the Bone at the BBC | - | - | - | - |
| 2018 | Road Works, Vol. 5: Live in Sacramento | - | - | - | - |
| 2019 | Road Works, Vol. 6: Live in Japan | - | - | - | - |
| 2019 | Live at Glasgow Apollo 77 | - | - | - | - |
| 2019 | Live at Rockpalast (Recorded live in 1976 in Cologne, Germany) | - | - | - | - |
| 2021 | Live at Portsmouth 1980 | - | - | - | - |
| 2021 | Live from California to Kawasaki (Re-packaging of Road Works, Vol. 5: Live in Sacramento and Road Works, Vol. 6: Live in Japan) | - | - | - | - |
| 2022 | Living Proof, Live Recordings 1976-1980 | - | - | - | - |
| 2023 | Live Dates Live | - | - | - | - |
| 2024 | Wishlist | - | - | - | - |
| 2025 | At the BBC 1970-1988 | - | - | - | - |

=== Compilation albums ===
| Year | Title |
|---|---|
| 1977 | Classic Ash |
| 1977 | The Original Wishbone Ash |
| 1981 | The Best of Wishbone Ash |
| 1993 | Time Was: The Wishbone Ash Collection |
| 1994 | The Very Best of Wishbone Ash: Blowin' Free |
| 1997 | The Best of Wishbone Ash |
| 1997 | Distillation |
| 1999 | Millennium Collection |
| 2001 | Blowin' Free: An Introduction to Wishbone Ash |
| 2003 | The Collection |
| 2003 | Warriors |
| 2004 | Backbones |
| 2004 | Lost Pearls |
| 2005 | Mystery Man |
| 2008 | Tough |
| 2008 | Tender |
| 2010 | Sometime World - An MCA Travelogue |
| 2013 | The Essential Collection |
| 2018 | The Vintage Years 1970-1991 |

== Singles ==
| Year | Title | Album | B-Side |
|---|---|---|---|
| 1971 | "Blind Eye" | Wishbone Ash | "Queen of Torture" |
| 1972 | "No Easy Road"* | Wishbone Four | "Blowin' Free" |
| 1973 | "So Many Things to Say" | Wishbone Four | "Rock and Roll Widow" |
| 1974 | "Hometown" | There's the Rub | "Persephone" |
| 1975 | "Silver Shoes" | There's the Rub | "Persephone" |
| 1976 | "Outward Bound" | New England | "Lorelei" |
| 1977 | "Phoenix" | Non-album single | "Blowin' Free" / "Jail Bait" |
| 1977 | "Front Page News" | Front Page News | "Diamond Jack" |
| 1977 | "Goodbye Baby, Hello Friend" | Front Page News | "Come In from the Rain" |
| 1978 | "You See Red" | No Smoke Without Fire | "Bad Weather Blues" (live) |
| 1979 | "Come On" | Non-album single | "Fast Johnny" |
| 1980 | "Living Proof" | Just Testing | "Jail Bait" (live) |
| 1980 | "Helpless (Live)" | Live Dates 2 | "Blowin' Free" (live) |
| 1981 | "Underground" | Number the Brave | "My Mind Is Made Up" |
| 1981 | "Get Ready" | Number the Brave | "Kicks on the Street" |
| 1982 | "Engine Overheat" | Twin Barrels Burning | "Genevieve" |
| 1982 | "No More Lonely Nights" | Twin Barrels Burning | "Streets of Shame" |
| 1988 | "In the Skin" | Nouveau Calls | "Tangible Evidence" |
| 1989 | "Cosmic Jazz" | Here to Hear | "T-Bone Shuffle" |
| 2010 | "Reason to Believe" | Elegant Stealth | |

- Note: "No Easy Road" was rerecorded in 1973 for the "Wishbone Four" album. The original single, recorded in 1972, is a different version.

== Tribute and cover albums ==
| Year | Title |
|---|---|
| 2000 | Y2WA |
| 2005 | Wishbone Ish |
