= Hipgnosis =

English art design group

The logotype for Led Zeppelin, designed by Hipgnosis in 1973

Hipgnosis were an English art design group, based in London, that specialised in creating album cover artwork for rock musicians and bands. Their commissions included work for Pink Floyd, Def Leppard, T. Rex, the Pretty Things, Black Sabbath, Wishbone Ash, UFO, 10cc, Bad Company, Led Zeppelin, AC/DC, Scorpions, the Nice, Paul McCartney & Wings, the Alan Parsons Project, Yes, Genesis, Peter Gabriel, Electric Light Orchestra, Rainbow, Styx and Al Stewart.

Hipgnosis consisted primarily of Cambridge natives Storm Thorgerson and Aubrey Powell, and later Peter Christopherson. The group dissolved in 1983, though Thorgerson worked on album designs until his death in 2013. Powell has worked with Paul McCartney and the Who in film and video production, and as the creative director for both Pink Floyd and their lead guitarist David Gilmour. Christopherson went on to produce music videos for many bands and shot some of the earliest promotional photography for the Sex Pistols, but worked primarily as an electronic musician in the bands Throbbing Gristle, Psychic TV and Coil until his death in 2010.

== History ==
In 1968, Thorgerson and Powell were approached by their friends in Pink Floyd to design the cover for the group's second album, A Saucerful of Secrets. This led to additional work for EMI, including photos and album covers for the Pretty Things, Free, Toe Fat and the Gods. Being film and art school students, they were able to use the darkroom at the Royal College of Art, but when they completed school, they had to set up their own facilities. They built a small darkroom in Powell's bathroom, but shortly thereafter, in early 1970, rented space and built a studio located at 6 Denmark Street.

When first starting out, Powell and Thorgerson adopted their name from graffiti they found on the door to their apartment. Thorgerson said they liked the word, not only for punning on "hypnosis", but for possessing "a nice sense of contradiction, of an impossible co-existence, from Hip = new, cool, and groovy, and gnosis, relating to ancient learning".

Hipgnosis gained major international prominence in 1973 with their cover design for Pink Floyd's The Dark Side of the Moon. The final design was one of several versions prepared for the band to choose from, but according to drummer Nick Mason, the 'prism/pyramid' design was the immediate and unanimous choice. The record itself became one of the biggest-selling and longest-charting albums of all time, and the cover has since been hailed as one of the best of all time (VH1 rated it as No. 4 in 2003). After that, the firm became highly sought-after and did many covers for high-profile bands and artists such as Led Zeppelin, Genesis, UFO, Black Sabbath, Peter Gabriel, the Alan Parsons Project, and Yes. They also designed the cover for a UK paperback edition of Douglas Adams's The Hitchhiker's Guide to the Galaxy (Adams would describe Thorgerson as "The best album designer in the world"), as well as the original UK hardcover edition of Norman Spinrad's Bug Jack Barron.

Peter Christopherson joined Hipgnosis as an assistant in 1974 and later became a full partner. The firm employed many assistants and other staff members over the years, including freelance designers and illustrators Richard Evans, George Hardie, and Richard Manning.

Hipgnosis did not have a set fee for designing an album cover but instead asked the artists to "pay what they thought it was worth".

== Style ==
Hipgnosis's approach to album design was strongly photography-oriented, and they pioneered the use of many innovative visual and packaging techniques. In particular, Thorgerson and Powell's surreal, elaborately manipulated photos (utilizing darkroom tricks, multiple exposures, airbrush retouching, and mechanical cut-and-paste techniques) were a film-based forerunner of what would, much later, be called photoshopping. Hipgnosis mainly used Hasselblad medium format cameras for their work.

Hipgnosis covers were noted for their quirky humour, such as the cover for the Pink Floyd double-LP compilation A Nice Pair (1973), which featured an array of visual puns. Another example was the 1974 album There's the Rub for Wishbone Ash using a picture of a cricketer and ball.

Such humour once angered Jimmy Page of Led Zeppelin, when Hipgnosis created a visual pun based on "(tennis) racquet"/"(noise) racket" for the 1973 album Houses of the Holy. Hipgnosis almost lost Led Zeppelin as a client as a result.

Another trademark was that many of their cover photos visually related to the album's lyrics, often depicting puns or double meanings of words in the album title. Since both Powell and Thorgerson were film students, they often used models and staged the photos in a highly theatrical manner. Hipgnosis covers rarely featured artists' photos on the outside, and most were in a gatefold cover format to provide ample space for their imagery.

Many of Hipgnosis's covers also featured pen and ink logos and illustrations designed to appear high-tech (often by graphic designer George Hardie), stickers, fancy inner sleeves, and other packaging bonuses. One of the extras created by Hipgnosis was the specially printed inner sleeve for Led Zeppelin's In Through the Out Door (1979) LP, which was black and white but turned to colour when dampened with water (tying in with the main cover's photographic theme).

== Catalogue ==
Year	Artist	Album
1968	Pink Floyd	A Saucerful of Secrets
1968	Alexis Korner	A New Generation of Blues
1968	The Gods	Genesis
1968	Pepe Jaramillo	Till There Was You
1968	The Aynsley Dunbar Retaliation	The Aynsley Dunbar Retaliation
1969	Pink Floyd	More
1969	The Gun	Gun Sight
1969	The Gods	To Samuel a Son
1969	Pink Floyd	Ummagumma
1969	Panama Limited Jug Band	Panama Limited Jug Band
1969	Humble Pie	Town and Country
1969	Island Records artists	You Can All Join In
1970	The Greatest Show on Earth	Horizons
1970	Pink Floyd	Atom Heart Mother
1970	Quatermass	Quatermass
1970	The Pretty Things	Parachute
1970	The Greatest Show on Earth	The Going's Easy
1970	Syd Barrett	The Madcap Laughs
1970	The Nice	Five Bridges
1970	Toe Fat	Toe Fat
1970	Cochise	Cochise
1970	Harvest Records artists	Picnic – A Breath of Fresh Air
1970	Panama Limited	Indian Summer
1970	Sounds Nice	Love at First Sight
1970	Gravy Train	Gravy Train
1970	Syd Barrett	Barrett
1970	The Aynsley Dunbar Retaliation	Remains to Be Heard
1970	Argent	Ring of Hands
1970	Jackson Heights	King Progress
1970	Twink	Think Pink
1970	Probe Records artists	Handle With Care
1971	T. Rex	Electric Warrior
1971	Toe Fat	Toe Fat Two
1971	Trees	On the Shore
1971	Marvin, Welch & Farrar	Marvin, Welch & Farrar
1971	The Nice	Elegy
1971	Pink Floyd	Meddle
1971	Electric Light Orchestra	The Electric Light Orchestra
1971	Audience	House on the Hill
1971	Edgar Broughton Band	Edgar Broughton Band
1971	Wishbone Ash	Pilgrimage
1971	Climax Blues Band	Tightly Knit
1971	Tear Gas	Tear Gas
1971	Stackridge	Stackridge
1971	Daddy Longlegs	Oakdown Farm
1971	The Masters Apprentices	Master's Apprentices
1971	John Williams	Changes
1971	Pink Floyd	The Piper at the Gates of Dawn (Italian reissue)
1971	Rory Gallagher	Rory Gallagher
1972	Flash	Flash
1972	Wishbone Ash	Argus
1972	The Nice	Autumn '67 – Spring '68
1972	Fumble	Fumble
1972	The Hollies	Distant Light
1972	Renaissance	Prologue
1972	Edgar Broughton Band	Inside Out
1972	Audience	Lunch
1972	The Pretty Things	Freeway Madness
1972	Pink Floyd	Obscured by Clouds
1972	Emerson, Lake & Palmer	Trilogy
1972	Blue Mink	A Time of Change
1972	Roger Cook	Meanwhile...Back at the World
1972	Glencoe	Glencoe
1972	Danta	Danta
1972	The Hollies	Romany
1972	Olivia Newton-John	Olivia
1972	Labi Siffre	Crying Laughing Loving Lying
1973	Electric Light Orchestra	ELO 2
1973	Pink Floyd	The Dark Side of the Moon
1973	Roger Cook	Minstrel in Flight
1973	Electric Light Orchestra	On the Third Day
1973	Edgar Broughton Band	Oora
1973	Al Stewart	Past, Present and Future
1973	Argent	In Deep
1973	Led Zeppelin	Houses of the Holy
1973	Audience	You Can't Beat 'Em
1973	Roy Harper	Lifemask
1973	Renaissance	Ashes Are Burning
1973	Wishbone Ash	Wishbone Four
1973	Wishbone Ash	Live Dates
1973	Flash	Out of Our Hands
1973	Various artists	Music from Free Creek
1973	Humble Pie	Thunderbox
1973	Vinegar Joe	Rock 'n Roll Gypsies
1973	Babe Ruth	Amar Caballero
1973	Pink Floyd	A Nice Pair
1973	Public Foot the Roman	Public Foot the Roman
1973	The Shadows	Rockin' with Curly Leads
1974	Sharks	Jab It in Yore Eye
1974	Uno	Uno
1974	Genesis	The Lamb Lies Down on Broadway
1974	Wishbone Ash	There's the Rub
1974	Nazareth	Rampant
1974	Renaissance	Turn of the Cards
1974	Roy Harper	Valentine
1974	Peter Frampton	Somethin's Happening
1974	Roy Harper	Flashes from the Archives of Oblivion
1974	Bad Company	Bad Company
1974	Blue Mink	Fruity
1974	Fumble	Poetry in Lotion
1974	Syd Barrett	Syd Barrett
1974	10cc	Sheet Music
1974	The Pretty Things	Silk Torpedo
1974	UFO	Phenomenon
1974	Cyril Havermans	Mind Wave
1974	The Hollies	Hollies
1974	Sweet	Desolation Boulevard
1975	UFO	Force It
1975	The Pretty Things	Savage Eye
1975	Pink Floyd	Wish You Were Here
1975	Bad Company	Straight Shooter
1975	Renaissance	Scheherazade and Other Stories
1975	Roy Harper	HQ
1975	Edgar Broughton Band	A Bunch of 45s
1975	The Greatest Show on Earth	The Greatest Show on Earth
1975	10cc	The Original Soundtrack
1975	The Pretty Things	S. F. Sorrow / Parachute, double reissue (UK version only)
1975	Al Stewart	Modern Times
1975	Wings	Venus and Mars
1975	Alberto y Lost Trios Paranoias	Alberto y Lost Trios Paranoias
1975	Caravan	Cunning Stunts
1975	Sassafras	Wheelin 'n' Dealin
1975	Bob Sargeant	First Starring Role
1975	Strife	Rush
1975	The Winkies	The Winkies
1975	Solution	Cordon Bleu
1975	Dave Edmunds	Subtle as a Flying Mallet
1975	The Shadows	Specs Appeal
1976	AC/DC	Dirty Deeds Done Dirt Cheap (International edition)
1976	Golden Earring	To the Hilt
1976	Montrose	Jump on It
1976	Kevin Coyne	Heartburn
1976	Wings	Wings at the Speed of Sound
1976	Al Stewart	Year of the Cat
1976	The Alan Parsons Project	Tales of Mystery and Imagination
1976	Black Sabbath	Technical Ecstasy
1976	Genesis	A Trick of the Tail
1976	10cc	How Dare You!
1976	Led Zeppelin	The Song Remains the Same
1976	Led Zeppelin	Presence
1976	Brand X	Unorthodox Behaviour
1976	Wings	Wings over America
1976	Jon Anderson	Olias of Sunhillow
1976	Nazareth	Close Enough for Rock 'n' Roll
1976	UFO	No Heavy Petting
1976	Wishbone Ash	New England
1976	Genesis	Wind & Wuthering
1976	John Miles	Stranger in the City
1976	The Hollies	Russian Roulette
1977	Wishbone Ash	Front Page News
1977	Justin Hayward	Songwriter
1977	UFO	Lights Out
1977	The Alan Parsons Project	I Robot
1977	10cc	Deceptive Bends
1977	Roy Harper	Bullinamingvase
1977	Brand X	Moroccan Roll
1977	Brand X	Livestock
1977	Sammy Hagar	Sammy Hagar
1977	Al Stewart	The Early Years
1977	Sammy Hagar	Musical Chairs
1977	Bad Company	Burnin' Sky
1977	Pink Floyd	Animals
1977	Electric Light Orchestra	The Light Shines On
1977	Peter Gabriel	Peter Gabriel (I) (aka "Car")
1977	Yes	Going for the One
1977	Fabulous Poodles	Mirror Stars
1977	Steve Harley & Cockney Rebel	Face to Face: A Live Recording
1977	Hawkwind	Quark, Strangeness and Charm
1977	Space	Deliverance
1977	Status Quo	Live!
1977	Strawbs	Deadlines
1977	The Moody Blues	Caught Live + 5
1977	Paul McCartney (as "Percy 'Thrills' Thrillington")	Thrillington
1977	Wishbone Ash	Classic Ash
1978	Manset	2870
1978	Pezband	Laughing in the Dark
1978	Be-Bop Deluxe	Drastic Plastic
1978	Richard Wright	Wet Dream
1978	David Gilmour	David Gilmour
1978	Styx	Pieces of Eight
1978	Wings	Wings Greatest
1978	Todd Rundgren	Back to the Bars
1978	XTC	Go 2
1978	Robin Trower	Caravan to Midnight
1978	Yes	Tormato
1978	Genesis	…And Then There Were Three…
1978	Wishbone Ash	No Smoke Without Fire
1978	Peter Gabriel	Peter Gabriel (II) (aka "Scratch")
1978	Al Stewart	Time Passages
1978	The Alan Parsons Project	Pyramid
1978	Black Sabbath	Never Say Die!
1978	Renaissance	A Song for All Seasons
1978	Synergy	Cords
1978	UFO	Obsession
1978	10cc	Bloody Tourists
1978	The Motors	Approved by the Motors (version 2)
1978	John Miles	Zaragon
1978	Hot Chocolate	Every 1's a Winner
1978	The Walker Brothers	Nite Flights
1978	Wings	London Town
1978	Gerry Rafferty	Gerry Rafferty
1978	Novalis	Vielleicht Bist Du Ein Clown?
1979	UFO	Strangers in the Night
1979	Scorpions	Lovedrive
1979	The Alan Parsons Project	Eve
1979	Bad Company	Desolation Angels
1979	The Dukes	The Dukes
1979	Edgar Broughton Band	Parlez-Vous English (as the Broughtons)
1979	10cc	Greatest Hits 1972–1978
1979	Led Zeppelin	In Through the Out Door
1979	Brand X	Product
1979	Manfred Mann's Earth Band	Angel Station
1979	Gary Brooker	No More Fear of Flying
1979	Steve Hillage	Live Herald
1979	Godley & Creme	Freeze Frame
1979	U.K.	Danger Money
1979	Mick Taylor	Mick Taylor
1979	Ashra	Correlations
1979	Ralph McTell	Slide Away the Screen
1979	Throbbing Gristle	20 Jazz Funk Greats
1979	Judie Tzuke	Welcome to the Cruise
1979	Wings	Back to the Egg
1979	Synergy	Games
1980	The Michael Schenker Group	The Michael Schenker Group
1980	The Pretty Things	Cross Talk
1980	Brand X	Do They Hurt?
1980	Mike Rutherford	Smallcreep's Day
1980	10cc	Look Hear?
1980	Peter Gabriel	Peter Gabriel (III) (aka "Melt")
1980	Scorpions	Animal Magnetism
1980	UFO	No Place to Run
1980	John Wetton	Caught in the Crossfire
1980	Wishbone Ash	Just Testing
1980	Leo Sayer	Living in a Fantasy
1980	The Police	De Do Do Do, De Da Da Da
1980	Wishbone Ash	Live Dates 2
1981	UFO	The Wild, the Willing and the Innocent
1981	Pink Floyd	A Collection of Great Dance Songs
1981	Rainbow	Difficult to Cure
1981	Nick Mason	Fictitious Sports
1981	Roger Taylor	Fun in Space
1981	Def Leppard	High 'n' Dry
1981	Yumi Matsutoya	Sakuban Oaisimashō
1981	Herman Rarebell	Nip in the Bud
1981	Cozy Powell	Tilt
1981	Rick Wakeman	1984
1982	John McLaughlin	Music Spoken Here
1982	Paul McCartney	Tug of War
1982	Rainbow	Straight Between the Eyes
1982	The Alan Parsons Project	Eye in the Sky
1982	Bad Company	Rough Diamonds
1982	Led Zeppelin	Coda
1983	Rainbow	Bent Out of Shape
1983	Yumi Matsutoya	Voyager
1983	Prototype	Prototype
