= Live Dates 2 =

Live album by Wishbone Ash
- Released: 20 October 1980
- Recorded: November 18, 1976 – June 4, 1980
- Genre: Rock
- Length: 80:54
- Label: MCA
- Producers: John Sherry, Wishbone Ash

Wishbone Ash chronology
| Just Testing (1980) | Live Dates 2 (1980) | Number the Brave (1981) |

Live Dates 2 is the third live album by rock band Wishbone Ash. The album was recorded partly on dates between 1976 and 1980, including the tour in support of the album Just Testing. It peaked at No. 40 in the UK Albums Chart.

The first 25,000 copies of this album were a double album, with six extra bonus tracks. Subsequent copies of the album contained only tracks one to six. The sleeve only lists the tracks on the first album along with their recording locations:

- Hull City Hall ("Doctor")
- Bristol Colston Hall ("Living Proof", "The Way Of The World")
- Wolverhampton Civic Hall ("Runaway", "Helpless")
- London Hammersmith Odeon ("F.U.B.B.")

The tracks on side one were recorded in 1980 and those on side two in 1978. Dates for the bonus LP are not listed.

The album was also released as two single LPs with the titles Live Dates 2 and Live Dates 2, Else Tapes.

== Track listing ==
Side one
| No. | Title | Original album | Length |
|---|---|---|---|
| 1. | "Doctor" | Wishbone Four | 5:47 |
| 2. | "Living Proof" | Just Testing | 5:55 |
| 3. | "Runaway" | New England | 3:15 |
| 4. | "Helpless" | Just Testing | 3:56 |

Side two
| No. | Title | Original album | Length |
|---|---|---|---|
| 1. | "F.U.B.B." | There's the Rub | 9:52 |
| 2. | "The Way Of The World" | No Smoke Without Fire | 10:25 |

Side three
| No. | Title | Original album | Length |
|---|---|---|---|
| 1. | "Lorelei" | New England | 6:28 |
| 2. | "Persephone" | There's the Rub | 8:38 |
| 3. | "(In All of My Dreams) You Rescue Me" | New England | 6:59 |

Side four
| No. | Title | Original album | Length |
|---|---|---|---|
| 1. | "Time Was" | Argus | 6:49 |
| 2. | "Goodbye Baby, Hello Friend" | Front Page News | 5:30 |
| 3. | "No Easy Road" | Wishbone Four | 7:20 |

== Personnel ==
Wishbone Ash

- Martin Turner - bass, vocals
- Andy Powell - guitar, vocals
- Laurie Wisefield - guitar, vocals
- Steve Upton - drums

Technical

- Produced by: John Sherry, Wishbone Ash
- Recorded at Apollo - Glasgow (19 November 1976), City Hall - Sheffield (18 October 1977), Marquee Club - London (19 October 1977), Hammersmith Odeon - London (25 October 1978), Colston Hall - Bristol, England (27 October 1978), Colston Hall - Bristol (16 February 1980), City Hall - Hull (1 June 1980), Civic Hall - Wolverhampton (4 June 1980)

== Charts ==
| Chart (1980) | Peak position |
|---|---|
| UK Albums (Official Charts) | 40 |
