= Live from Memphis (album) =

Live album by Wishbone Ash
- Released: 1972
- Recorded: 21 August 1972
- Genre: Hard rock • progressive rock
- Length: 32:17
- Producer: Wishbone Ash

Wishbone Ash chronology
Argus (1972)	Live from Memphis (1972)	Wishbone Four (1973)

Live from Memphis is a live promotional recording by rock band Wishbone Ash. The promotional recording featured only a few tracks and was only released in America. The entire EP was included as bonus tracks on the 2002 remastered version of Argus (1972).

== Track listings ==
=== Side one ===
1. "Jail Bait" – 4:57
2. "The Pilgrim" – 10:10

=== Side two ===
1. "Phoenix" – 17:05 (also included as bonus track on 1992 US release of Live Dates)

== Personnel ==
Wishbone Ash

- Andy Powell – guitar, vocals
- Ted Turner – guitar, vocals
- Martin Turner – bass guitar, vocals
- Steve Upton – drums
