= Joe Crabtree =

English drummer

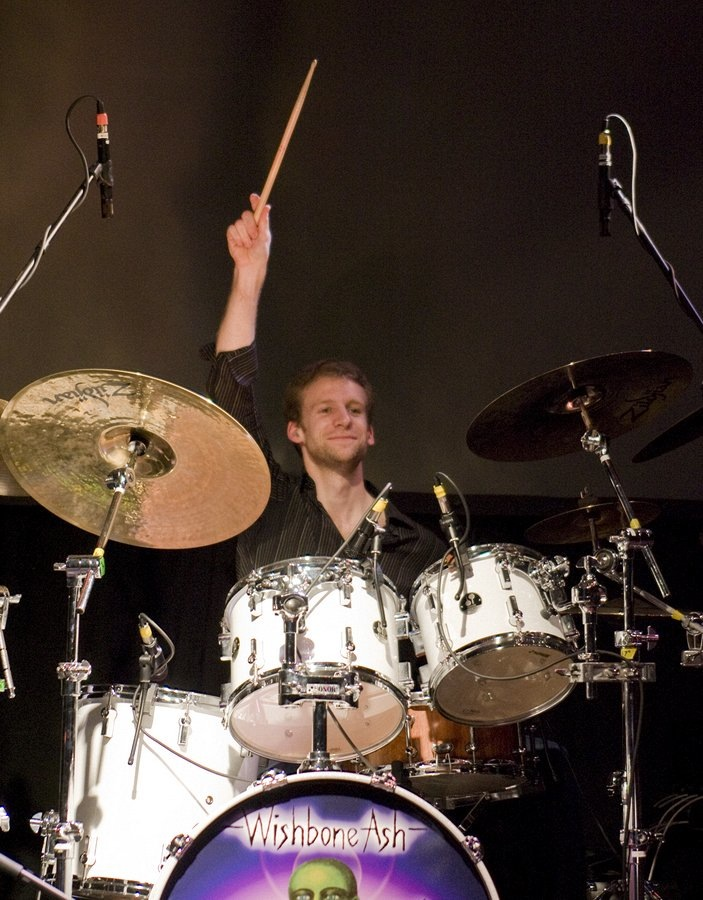
- Crabtree with Wishbone Ash

Background information
- Born: Joseph Crabtree; 21 September 1979 (age 46); Burnley, England
- Genres: Rock; alternative; jazz; funk
- Occupations: Musician; arranger; producer
- Instruments: Drums; percussion; guitar; bass; flute
- Years active: 1990s–present
- Formerly of: Wishbone Ash; Pendragon; the David Cross Band; Bedspace; Elena; Upsetta
- Website: Official website, Online Drum School

Joe Crabtree (born 21 September 1979) is an English rock drummer. He is a former member of Wishbone Ash and is also known for his work with Pendragon and the David Cross Band.

== Early life ==
The son of Mark Crabtree of Burnley-based professional audio equipment manufacturer AMS Neve, Joe lived in nearby Read and was educated at Clitheroe Royal Grammar School. Crabtree began his drumming career at age 11 studying with a local self-taught drummer, Harry Hindle. It was while studying with Hindle that Crabtree was first introduced to the drumming of Dave Weckl via his instructional video The Next Step. Crabtree cites this as a defining moment in his understanding of what was possible on the drums.

He started playing live shows at age 14, and began teaching drums to local drummers at age 15. Having taken up guitar at age 12, he also taught guitar to beginner students for a number of years.

While studying physics at Durham University between 1998 and 2000, Crabtree wrote and recorded with original band Breakmaus. Breakmaus recorded two self-released albums, That White Door and Arrested, and made an appearance on Sky TV on the show Where It's At. Crabtree also played with many cover bands, small jazz bands, and the university big band while studying at Durham.

Moving to London in 2004, Crabtree continued his drum studies with London musician Bob Armstrong, whose former students include Oasis's Alan White, and The Who's Zak Starkey.

== Professional career ==
After moving to London in 2004, Crabtree played and recorded with numerous original bands, including a stint with Goldie co-writer Tim Philbert's original project Upsetta.

In 2005, Crabtree joined former King Crimson member David Cross in the David Cross Band, which toured Japan, Italy and the UK resulting in the recording of Alive in the Underworld.

Bass player Mick Paul recommended Crabtree to Colosseum guitarist James Litherland to play with 1970s folk band Jade for a reunion show.

Litherland in turn passed Crabtree's name to "Sunshine of Your Love" lyricist Pete Brown, who then recommended Crabtree for the Xanda Howe band. In 2006, Crabtree joined Xanda Howe for a short tour along with Malcolm Bruce (son of Jack Bruce), with whom he later recorded.

Also between 2006 and 2008, Crabtree became a member of Pendragon and completed two European tours, appearing on the DVDs And Now Everybody to the Stage and Jewel - Past and Presence.

== Wishbone Ash ==
Crabtree performing on tour with Wishbone Ash.

Crabtree joined Wishbone Ash in 2007 for the Power of Eternity album and subsequent tour, replacing previous drummer Ray Weston.

He co-wrote songs on the Elegant Stealth and Blue Horizon albums, the latter of which he co-produced and contributed a guitar solo to the song "Take It Back".

He appears on the live DVDs Live in London, Live in Paris, and the rockumentary This Is Wishbone Ash as well as the live albums Argus Live, recorded live for SiriusXM radio, and the Roadworks series of releases.

As of 2017, Crabtree has played over 1,000 shows with Wishbone Ash in 29 countries, including an arena tour of South Africa along with Deep Purple and Uriah Heep.

In 2022 Crabtree was replaced by Mike Truscott.

== Teaching ==
Having taught private students for many years, Crabtree began a short stint teaching at the Academy of Contemporary Music before having to leave in 2007 when the Wishbone Ash touring schedule coincided with term time.

Inspired by how much he learned from DCI music videos, Crabtree set up an online drum school, JoeCrabtree.com, in 2006. The school has attracted more than 2,000 students, and his YouTube channel of drum lessons has garnered more than 5 million views. Outside of his own channels, Crabtree creates educational videos for the drumstick manufacturer Vic Firth's website.

Crabtree also contributes articles to Modern Drummer and provides regular "Joe Knows" columns to Drumhead Magazine.

== Software development ==
Crabtree also creates musical software.

== Discography ==
=== Wishbone Ash ===
Wishbone Ash Discography

Albums

- The Power Of Eternity (2007)
- Elegant Stealth (2011)
- Blue Horizon (2014)
- Coat of Arms (2020)

Live albums

- Argus "Then Again" Live (2008, live album)
- Roadworks 1 (2010, live album)
- Roadworks 2 (2011, live album)
- Roadworks 3 (2013, live album)
- Roadworks 4 (2014, live album)
- Roadworks Boxset (2015)
- Live in London - 40th Anniversary (2009)

Compilation albums

- Tough (2008, compilation album)
- Tender (2008, compilation album)

DVDs

- Live in London - 40th Anniversary (2009)
- Live in Paris (2016)
- This Is Wishbone Ash (2010)

Singles

- "Reason To Believe" (2011)
- "We Stand as One" (2020)
- "Back in the Day" (2020)

=== Pendragon ===
DVDs

- And Now Everybody To The Stage (2006)
- Past and Presence (2007)

=== David Cross Band ===
Albums

- Alive in the Underworld (2008, live)

== Equipment ==
Crabtree uses and endorses Sonor drums, Evans drum heads, Zildjian cymbals, Vic Firth sticks, Porter and Davies drum thrones, Sensaphonics in ear monitors and Tunerfish Lug Locks.
