= Standing in the Rain =

Standing in the Rain may refer to:

- A song by James Gang from Bang
- A song by Billy Talent from Billy Talent
- "Standing in the Rain", a John Paul Young song, 1977
- A song by Electric Light Orchestra from their 1977 double album Out of the Blue - listed as "Standin' In The Rain"
- A song by Action Bronson, Mark Ronson, and Dan Auerbach from Suicide Squad: The Album
- A song by Al Green from Lay It Down
- A song written by Ted Turner on the 1991 Wishbone Ash album Strange Affair
