= Tony Kishman =

American multi-instrumentalist

- Birth name: Anthony Kishman
- Born: Tucson, Arizona, United States
- Genres: Rock, hard rock
- Occupation(s): Musician, actor, producer, recording artist
- Instrument(s): Vocals, bass guitar, guitar, piano
- Years active: 1970s–present
- Website: http://www.liveandletdieshow.com

Tony Kishman is an American vocalist, bassist, pianist & guitarist, most noted for his work with Wishbone Ash and the musical Beatlemania.

== Early career ==
Kishman began his musical career playing in cover bands in the Tucson, Arizona area. While playing lead guitar in a band in South California, his booking agent – Fred Cisneros – suggested he audition for the US Beatlemania show. He passed the audition, and played Paul McCartney in the show between 1978 and 1983.

== Wishbone Ash ==
Following the end of the show, Kishman moved to England where he was introduced to Andy Powell. In 1994 he was asked to join the band as bassist and vocalist, and subsequently appeared on the band's Illuminations and Live in Geneva albums.

== Post-Wishbone Ash ==
In 1997, Kishman left Wishbone Ash to pursue different musical projects. He has returned to performing as Paul McCartney in Twist and Shout, an American Beatles tribute band.

Kishman is now a current band member with the critically acclaimed Classical Mystery Tour and Live and Let Die: The Music of Paul McCartney.
