= Mark Birch (musician) =

English guitarist

- Born: Kidderminster, Worcestershire, England
- Genres: Rock, hard rock
- Occupations: Singer-songwriter, musician
- Instruments: Guitar, vocals
- Years active: 1990s–present

Mark Birch is an English guitarist, best known for his work with rock band Wishbone Ash.

== Musical career ==
Birch spent much of his musical career gigging in the West Midlands, including playing in bands with Neville MacDonald of Skin. In the late 1990s, bandmate Bob Skeat recommended Birch to Andy Powell when a guitarist vacancy appeared. Birch joined Wishbone Ash in 1997, performing on the Trance Visionary, Psychic Terrorism, and Bare Bones albums. He toured extensively with the band, performing lead vocals on songs such as "Persephone" and "Phoenix", before leaving in 2001.

== Post-Wishbone Ash ==
In 2001, Birch left Wishbone Ash to follow a career in web design.
