= Backbones (album) =

Live album by Wishbone Ash
- Released: 25 October 2004
- Genre: Hard rock, rock
- Label: Talking Elephant

Wishbone Ash chronology
Almighty Blues: London and Beyond (2003)	Backbones (2004)	Lost Pearls (2004)

Professional ratings
Review scores
Source	Rating
Classic Rock	3/5 stars

Backbones is a 2004 live compilation album released by Wishbone Ash. The album's third disc contains live and acoustic versions of previously unreleased material.

== Track listing ==
=== Disc one ===
1. "Mountainside"
2. "Top of the World"
3. "Wait Out the Storm"
4. "No Joke"
5. "On Your Own"
6. "Wings of Desire"
7. "Errors of My Way"
8. "Master of Disguise"
9. "Everybody Needs a Friend"
10. "Living Proof"
11. "Almighty Blues"
12. "Faith Hope and Love"
13. "Ancient Remedy"
14. "Come Rain Come Shine"

=== Disc two ===
1. "Lifeline"
2. "Living Proof"
3. "Insomnia"
4. "You See Red"
5. "Throw Down the Sword"
6. "Time Was"
7. "Real Guitars Have Wings"
8. "Sometime World"
9. "Blowin’ Free"
10. "Hard on You"
11. "Is Justice Done"
12. "Sheriff of Sherwood"

=== Disc three ===
1. "Strange Affair"
2. "The King Will Come"
3. "Hard Times"
4. "Interview with Andy Powell
