= Live in Geneva =

Live in Geneva may refer to:

- Live in Geneva (Wishbone Ash album), 1995
- Live in Geneva (Merzbow album), 2005
