= New England (Wishbone Ash album) =

1976 studio album

Studio album by Wishbone Ash
- Released: October 1976
- Studio: Laurel Edge, Connecticut; Criteria Sound Studios, Miami
- Genre: Rock, hard rock
- Length: 37:02
- Label: MCA & Atlantic (US)
- Producer: Ron Albert, Howard Albert

Wishbone Ash chronology
Locked In (1976)	New England (1976)	Classic Ash (1977)

Professional ratings
Review scores
Source	Rating
AllMusic	3/5 stars

New England is the seventh studio album by rock band Wishbone Ash released only seven months after Locked In. It was a success compared to Locked In but still did not chart as high as most of their previous albums. It peaked at No. 22 in the UK Albums Chart. This album marked the "Americanization" of Wishbone Ash, as the band relocated from England to the Northeastern United States (New England) for tax purposes.

New England contained an even balance of hard rock songs and breezy, soft rock ballads, the latter of which would see further exploration from Wishbone Ash on their next studio album, Front Page News.

== Track listing ==
All songs written and composed by Martin Turner, Andy Powell, Laurie Wisefield and Steve Upton; except "Candlelight" by Martin Turner, Andy Powell, Laurie Wisefield, Steve Upton and Ted Turner.

=== Side one ===
1. "Mother of Pearl" – 4:25
2. "(In All of My Dreams) You Rescue Me" – 6:09
3. "Runaway" – 3:14
4. "Lorelei" – 5:20

=== Side two ===
1. "Outward Bound" – 4:48
2. "Prelude" – 1:13
3. "When You Know Love" – 5:43
4. "Lonely Island" – 4:23
5. "Candlelight" – 1:47

== Personnel ==
Wishbone Ash

- Martin Turner – bass, lead vocals
- Andy Powell – electric and acoustic guitars, backing vocals, mandolin
- Laurie Wisefield – electric and slide guitars, backing vocals
- Steve Upton – drums

Additional personnel

- Nelson "Flaco" Padron – percussion

== Charts ==
Chart (1976)	Peak position
German Albums (Offizielle Top 100)	35
UK Albums (OCC)	22
US Billboard 200	154
