= Number the Brave =

1981 studio album by Wishbone Ash

Studio album by Wishbone Ash
- Released: April 1981
- Recorded: Late 1980
- Studio: Criteria Studios, Miami, FL.
- Genre: Hard rock
- Length: 40:29
- Label: MCA
- Producer: Nigel Gray

Wishbone Ash chronology
Live Dates 2 (1980)	Number the Brave (1981)	The Best of Wishbone Ash (1981)

Professional ratings
Review scores
Source	Rating
Allmusic	2/5 stars

Number the Brave is the 11th studio album by rock band Wishbone Ash. It is the first album in the band's history recorded without founding bassist/vocalist Martin Turner. Turner was replaced (for this album only) by John Wetton, formerly of King Crimson and Uriah Heep. Also featured on Number the Brave was singer Claire Hamill as a backing vocalist, who would join Wishbone Ash on the 1981 tour to promote the album. Following "Vas Dis" on Pilgrimage and "Helpless" on Just Testing, the album featured only the third cover version released by the band on a studio album, Smokey Robinson's "Get Ready", previously a hit for The Temptations.

The album peaked at No. 61 on the UK Albums Chart.

== Track listing ==
=== Original UK release ===
==== Side one ====
1. "Loaded" (Laurie Wisefield/Steve Upton/Andy Powell) – 4:10
2. "Where Is the Love" (Upton/Wisefield/Powell) – 3:17
3. "Underground" (Powell/Wisefield/Upton) – 4:13
4. "Kicks on the Street" (Upton/Wisefield/Powell) – 4:14
5. "Open Road" (Upton/Wisefield/Powell) – 5:16

==== Side two ====
1. "Get Ready" (Smokey Robinson) – 3:14
2. "Rainstorm" (Wisefield/Upton/Powell) – 4:51
3. "That's That" (John Wetton) – 3:03
4. "Roller Coaster" (Wisefield/Powell/Upton) – 3:18
5. "Number the Brave" (Powell/Upton/Wisefield) – 4:53

=== Original US release ===
==== Side one ====
1. "Get Ready"
2. "Where Is the Love"
3. "That's That"
4. "Roller Coaster"
5. "Number the Brave"

==== Side two ====
1. "Loaded"
2. "Underground"
3. "Rainstorm"
4. "Kicks on the Street"
5. "Open Road"

== Personnel ==
Wishbone Ash

- Andy Powell – vocals (tracks 2, 3, 4, 5, 6, 10), guitar
- Laurie Wisefield – vocals (tracks 1, 7, 9), guitar, slide guitar
- Steve Upton – drums
- John Wetton – bass guitar, keyboards, lead vocal (8)

Additional personnel

- Claire Hamill – backing vocals
- Gasper Lawal – percussion

Production

- Nigel Gray – producer
- Penny Gibbons – coordinator
- Howard Barrett – equipment
- John Sherry – management
- Cream – sleeve design

== Charts ==
Chart (1981)	Peak position
UK Albums (OCC)	61
