= Tender (Wishbone Ash album) =

Compilation album by Wishbone Ash
- Released: 18 May 2008
- Genre: Rock
- Label: Talking Elephant

Wishbone Ash chronology
Tough (2008)	Tender (2008)	Argus "Then Again" Live (2008)

Tender is a compilation album by British rock artists Wishbone Ash, released in May 2008 by the Talking Elephant label. It features mellow songs by the band and complements the album Tough, featuring a compilation of rock numbers, that was released at the same time.

== Track listing ==
1. "Top of the World"
2. "The Ring"
3. "Faith Hope and Love"
4. "Loose Change"
5. "Dreams Outta Dust"
6. "Disappearing"
7. "The Raven"
8. "Everybody Needs a Friend"
