= Just Testing =

Studio album by Wishbone Ash
- Released: 18 January 1980
- Recorded: March–August 1979
- Studio: Surrey Sound Studios, Leatherhead, England; except "Helpless" at Kingsway Recorders, London
- Genre: Hard rock
- Length: 38:00
- Label: MCA
- Producer: Martin Turner; John Sherry; Wishbone Ash

Wishbone Ash chronology
Live in Tokyo (1979)	Just Testing (1980)	Live Dates 2 (1980)

Singles from Just Testing
- 1. "Living Proof/Jail Bait" Released: 1980; 2. "Helpless/Living Proof" Released: 1980

Professional ratings
Review scores
Source	Rating
AllMusic	2/5 stars

Just Testing is the tenth studio album by the British rock band Wishbone Ash, released on 18 January 1980 by MCA Records. Recorded primarily at Surrey Sound Studios in England, it was the last to feature the original lead vocalist and bass guitarist Martin Turner until the release of Nouveau Calls (1987). The track "Helpless" is only the second cover version released by the band on a studio album, the previous one being "Vas Dis" on Pilgrimage.

The album reached number 43 in the UK Albums Chart.

== Track listing ==
All tracks are written by Martin Turner, except where noted.

Side one
No.	Title	Writer(s)	Length
1.	"Living Proof"	Laurie Wisefield, Claire Hamill	5:44
2.	"Haunting Me"		4:34
3.	"Insomnia"		5:10
4.	"Helpless"	Paul Kendrick	4:03

Side two
No.	Title	Writer(s)	Length
5.	"Pay the Price"		3:35
6.	"New Rising Star"		3:58
7.	"Master of Disguise"	Andy Powell	4:26
8.	"Lifeline"	Turner, Powell, Wisefield, Steve Upton	6:29
Total length:			38:00

1998 remastered edition bonus tracks
No.	Title	Writer(s)	Length
9.	"Come On"	Chuck Berry	3:23
10.	"Fast Johnny"	Turner, Powell, Wisefield, Upton	4:04
11.	"Blowin' Free" (live)	Powell, Upton, Ted Turner, Turner	6:34
12.	"Helpless" (live)	Kendrick	3:46
Total length:			55:43

== Personnel ==
=== Wishbone Ash ===
- Andy Powell – electric and acoustic guitars, backing vocals
- Laurie Wisefield – electric and acoustic guitars, backing vocals
- Martin Turner – lead vocals, bass guitar, acoustic guitar, backing vocals; co-producer
- Steve Upton – drums and percussion

=== Additional musicians ===
- Claire Hamill – vocals (on "Living Proof", "Pay the Price" and "Master of Disguise")
- Ian Kew – organ (on "Master of Disguise")

=== Technical personnel ===
- John Sherry – co-producer
- Martin Moss – engineer
- Bob Broglia – engineer
- Colin Elgie – sleeve design
- Hipgnosis – photography and art direction

== Charts ==
Chart (1980)	Peak position
German Albums (Offizielle Top 100)	51
UK Albums (OCC)	41
US Billboard 200	179
