= Tough (Wishbone Ash album) =

Compilation album by Wishbone Ash
- Released: 18 May 2008
- Genre: Rock
- Label: Talking Elephant

Wishbone Ash chronology
Power of Eternity (2007)	Tough (2008)	Tender (2008)

Tough is a compilation album by British rock artists Wishbone Ash, released in May 2008 by the Talking Elephant label. It features rock numbers by the band and complements the album Tender, featuring a compilation of mellow tunes, that was released at the same time.

== Track listing ==
1. "Mountainside"
2. "Wait Out The Storm"
3. "Almighty Blues"
4. "Changing Tracks"
5. "Ancient Remedy"
6. "Eyes Wide Open"
7. "The Power"
8. "Healing Ground"
9. "In Crisis"
