= No Smoke Without Fire =

1978 studio album by Wishbone Ash

Studio album by Wishbone Ash
- Released: 6 October 1978
- Recorded: June–August 1978
- Studio: De Lane Lea, London, England
- Genre: Hard rock
- Length: 40:58
- Label: MCA
- Producer: Derek Lawrence

Wishbone Ash chronology
Front Page News (1977)	No Smoke Without Fire (1978)	Live in Tokyo (1979)

Professional ratings
Review scores
Source	Rating
Allmusic	2.5/5 stars

No Smoke Without Fire is the ninth studio album by English rock band Wishbone Ash. It was the first album since 1972's Argus to be produced by Derek Lawrence. The album peaked at No. 43 in the UK Albums Chart.

== Track listing ==
All songs written and composed by Laurie Wisefield except where noted.

=== Side one ===
1. "You See Red" – 6:03
2. "Baby the Angels Are Here" (Martin Turner) – 4:44
3. "Ships in the Sky" – 3:02
4. "Stand and Deliver" – 7:35

=== Side two ===
1. "Anger in Harmony" (Andy Powell, Wisefield, Turner) – 5:00
2. "Like a Child" (Turner) – 4.53
3. "The Way of the World (Part 1)" – 4:09
4. "The Way of the World (Part 2)" – 5:32

1998 remastered edition bonus tracks
No.	Title	Writer(s)	Length
9.	"Firesign"	Martin Turner	5:05
10.	"Time and Space" (remix)	Martin Turner	6:00
11.	"Lorelei" (live)	Andy Powell, Steve Upton, Laurie Wisefield, Martin Turner	6:00
12.	"Come in from the Rain" (live)	Martin Turner	4:55
13.	"Bad Weather Blues" (live)	Steve Upton, Andy Powell, Martin Turner, Laurie Wisefield	8:00

== Personnel ==
Wishbone Ash

- Martin Turner – bass guitar, vocals
- Andy Powell – guitar, vocals
- Laurie Wisefield – guitar, vocals
- Steve Upton – drums

Production

- Derek Lawrence – producer
- Rafe McKenna – engineer
- Peter Wandless – assistant engineer
- Hipgnosis – cover design, photography
- Colin Elgie – graphics
- Richard Draper – cover model
- Peter Christopherson – cover model

== Charts ==
Chart (1978)	Peak position
UK Albums (OCC)	43
