= Live Dates =

Live album by Wishbone Ash
- Released: November 1973
- Recorded: 17–24 June 1973
- Genres: Progressive rock, hard rock
- Length: 81:46
- Label: MCA
- Producer: Wishbone Ash

Wishbone Ash chronology
Wishbone Four (1973)	Live Dates (1973)	There's the Rub (1974)

Professional ratings
Review scores
Source	Rating
Allmusic	4/5 stars

Live Dates is a live album by the British rock band Wishbone Ash released in November 1973.

Following the release of the album, founding member Ted Turner left the band.

== Recording ==
The album features 11 tracks, 10 of which originally featured on the band's first four albums. The one new track was a cover of the Jimmy Reed blues standard "Baby What You Want Me to Do".

The tracks were recorded in June 1973 at Croydon Fairfield Halls, Reading University, Newcastle City Hall, and Portsmouth Guildhall using the Rolling Stones Mobile Studio.

In 2023, the band's other guitarist Andy Powell said, "We had made a name for ourselves as a dynamic live act, so it only made sense to capture the energy and vibrancy of our shows on a live album. Fortunately, the record company funded the costly Rolling Stones Mobile recording truck, so we were able to record several shows during our U.K. tour and compile the most powerful moments on Live Dates." Also in 2023, Wishbone Ash undertook a 50th anniversary tour celebrating the album, and recorded and released Live Dates Live, as a tribute to the original Live Dates.

Band founder and original bass guitarist Martin Turner also celebrated the 50th anniversary of the album in 2023, by touring across the UK. He had previously released a double live album New Live Dates in 2016, which also featured Ted Turner.

Live Dates charted at number 86 in Canada in February 1974. It is certified silver (60,000 sales) by the BPI in the UK.

== Track listing ==
Side one

1. "The King Will Come" (Note: Recorded at Croydon Fairfield Halls on 17 June 1973) – 7:58
2. "Warrior" (Note: Recorded at Newcastle City Hall on 24 June 1973) – 5:42
3. "Throw Down the Sword" – 6:01

Side two

1. "Rock 'n Roll Widow" (Note: Recorded at Reading University on 23 June 1973) – 6:06
2. "Ballad of the Beacon" – 5:21
3. "Baby What You Want Me to Do" (Note: Recorded at Portsmouth Guildhall on 21 June 1973) – 7:48

Side three

1. "The Pilgrim" – 9:17
2. "Blowin' Free" – 5:28
3. "Jail Bait" – 4:40

Side four

1. "Lady Whiskey" – 6.13
2. "Phoenix" – 17:12

== Personnel ==
- Andy Powell – guitar, vocals
- Ted Turner – guitar, vocals
- Martin Turner – bass, vocals
- Steve Upton – drums

== Charts ==
Chart (1973)	Peak position
Canada Top Albums/CDs (RPM)	86
US Billboard 200	82

== Certifications ==
Region	Certification	Certified units/sales
United Kingdom (BPI)	Silver	60,000^{^}
^{^} Shipments figures based on certification alone.
