= Elegant Stealth =

2011 studio album by Wishbone Ash

Studio album by Wishbone Ash
- Released: 25 November 2011
- Studio: Cross Stix Studios, Lancashire, England
- Genre: Progressive rock, hard rock
- Length: 65:52
- Label: ZYX
- Producer: Andy Powell, Tom Greenwood

Wishbone Ash chronology
Argus "Then Again" Live (2008)	Elegant Stealth (2011)	Blue Horizon (2014)

Professional ratings
Review scores
Source	Rating
Classic Rock	7/10 stars

Elegant Stealth is the 21st studio album from rock band Wishbone Ash and the culmination of two years of writing and recording sessions. The songs featured on the band's 2012 tour of Europe.

The album features guest artists Don Airey (Deep Purple / Ozzy Osbourne / Black Sabbath) and Pat McManus (Mama's Boys / Celtus / Pat McManus Band).

All songs were recorded at Cross Stix Studios, Lancashire, England on AMS Neve genesys by Tom Greenwood except for "Reason to Believe" and "Man with No Name" which were recorded by Stephan Ernst (also at Cross Stix). Both of these recordings were mixed at Separate Sounds Studios in Nuremberg, Germany.

== Track listing ==
All songs composed by Andy Powell, Muddy Manninen, Bob Skeat and Joe Crabtree, except where noted

1. "Reason to Believe" – 4:21
2. "Warm Tears" – 5:02
3. "Man with No Name" – 4:18
4. "Can't Go It Alone" (Pat McManus) – 5:39
5. "Give It Up" (Powell) – 5:07
6. "Searching for Satellites" – 6:02
7. "Heavy Weather" – 6:40
8. "Mud-slick" (Manninen) – 4:14
9. "Big Issues" – 7:42
10. "Migrant Worker" – 5:13
11. "Invisible Thread" – 11:34

"Invisible Thread" includes a hidden track after approx. one minute of silence: "Reason to Believe – Remix by Al Carson"

== Personnel ==
=== Wishbone Ash ===
- Andy Powell – guitar, lead and backing vocals
- Muddy Manninen – guitar, backing vocals, Hammond organ
- Bob Skeat – bass, backing vocals
- Joe Crabtree – drums, percussion

=== Additional musicians ===
- Don Airey – Hammond B3 organ on "Mud-slick"
- Pat McManus – fiddle on "Can't Go It Alone"
