= Locked In (album) =

1976 studio album by Wishbone Ash

Studio album by Wishbone Ash
- Released: 12 March 1976
- Studios: Atlantic Studios, New York City, US
- Genres: Rock, soft rock
- Length: 36:58
- Labels: MCA and Atlantic Records U.S.
- Producer: Tom Dowd

Wishbone Ash chronology
There's the Rub (1974)	Locked In (1976)	New England (1976)

Professional ratings
Review scores
Source	Rating
AllMusic	1.5/5 stars

Locked In is the sixth studio album by the rock band Wishbone Ash, and their second with guitarist Laurie Wisefield, who had joined the band in 1974. It was also the first Wishbone Ash album to feature original tracks not credited to the whole group, with four of the tracks credited to either one or two members.

The album peaked at No. 36 on the UK Albums Chart in April 1976, their lowest UK chart placing to date.

The album is considered by many – critics, fans and the band themselves – to be one of the weaker entries in their extensive catalog. The band frequently place the blame on producer Tom Dowd, who insisted the band play much quieter in the studio, removing much of the energy of their performances. The band had switched U.S. distribution from MCA Records to Atlantic Records for this and the next release, New England.

== Track listing ==
All songs composed by Wishbone Ash, except where noted

1. "Rest in Peace" – 6:44
2. "No Water in the Well" (Laurie Wisefield) – 3:47
3. "Moonshine" – 3:35
4. "She Was My Best Friend" (Martin Turner) – 3:52
5. "It Started in Heaven" (Wisefield, Steve Upton) – 3:22
6. "Half Past Lovin'" – 5:32
7. "Trust in You" – 5:06
8. "Say Goodbye" (Turner, Wisefield) – 5:00

== Personnel ==
Wishbone Ash

- Martin Turner – bass, vocals
- Andy Powell – guitars, vocals
- Laurie Wisefield – guitars, vocals
- Steve Upton – drums

with:

- Pete Wood – keyboards
- Cissy Houston, Sylvia Shemwell and Eunice Peterson – backing vocals on tracks 4 and 5

== Production ==
- Producer – Tom Dowd
- Recordists – Geoff Daking and Jay Borden
- Mixdown – Geoff Daking, Jay Borden and Bobby Warner
- Album art direction – Alan Sussman and Bob Defrin
- Album cover illustration – Chris Corey
- Album backliner photography – David Gahr

== Charts ==
Chart (1976)	Peak position
UK Albums (Official Charts)	36
US Billboard 200	136
