= Howard Albert =

Printmaker and musician

- Born: 1911
- Died: 2004 (aged 92–93)
- Known for: Printmaking

Howard Albert (1911–2004) was a printmaker, musician, and composer. He attended the Art Institute of Chicago in the late 1930s. He also studied printmaking with Stanley William Hayter at Atelier 17 in New York. Hayter's studio was a workshop for other artists such as Picasso and Miró.

In the 1930-1940s, Albert worked for a radio station in Chicago. Albert founded a printmaking organization called the Pauper's Press where he taught during the 1960s–70s. He was a master of engraving, etching, and woodblock printing. His subjects often included figures, abstraction, typography, and eroticism. In the 1980s, he moved to Berkeley, California. Albert died in Berkley in 2004.
