= Twin Barrels Burning =

1982 album by Wishbone Ash

Studio album by Wishbone Ash
- Released: 8 October 1982
- Studio: The Sol, Cookham, Berkshire; Surrey Sound, Leatherhead, England (track 4)
- Genre: Hard rock
- Length: 38:57
- Label: AVM Records
- Producer: Wishbone Ash, Ashley Howe, Stuart Epps (track 4 produced by Nigel Gray and Stuart Epps)

Wishbone Ash chronology
The Best of Wishbone Ash (1981)	Twin Barrels Burning (1982)	Raw to the Bone (1985)

Professional ratings
Review scores
Source	Rating
AllMusic	2.5/5 stars

Twin Barrels Burning is the twelfth studio album by British rock band Wishbone Ash. It was recorded at Sol Studios and released in 1982. It was the highest charting Wishbone Ash album since 1976, reaching No. 22 in the UK Albums Chart. Conversely, it was the final album to appear in that listing to date.

It is the only Wishbone Ash album to feature Uriah Heep bassist Trevor Bolder, who was a member of the band for two years (April 1981 – April 1983)

== Track listing ==
All tracks are written by Laurie Wisefield, Steve Upton and Andy Powell.

Side one
No.	Title	Length
1.	"Engine Overheat"	4:03
2.	"Can't Fight Love"	3:59
3.	"Genevieve"	3:34
4.	"Me and My Guitar"	3:58
5.	"Hold On"	4:48

Side two
No.	Title	Length
1.	"Streets of Shame"	4:34
2.	"No More Lonely Nights"	5:12
3.	"Angels Have Mercy"	3:50
4.	"Wind Up"	4.59

== Personnel ==
=== Wishbone Ash ===
- Andy Powell – guitar, lead and backing vocals
- Laurie Wisefield – guitar, lead and backing vocals
- Trevor Bolder – bass guitar, backing vocals, lead vocals on track 5
- Steve Upton – drums

=== Additional personnel ===
- Allan Townsend – synthesizer on "Hold On"

=== Production ===
- Ashley Howe, Stuart Epps – producers, engineers
- Nigel Gray – producer and engineer on track 4
- John Sherry – executive producer
- Ian Harris – sleeve design and art

== Charts ==
Chart (1982)	Peak position
UK Albums (OCC)	22
