= Blue Horizon (Wishbone Ash album) =

Studio album by Wishbone Ash
- Released: 21 February 2014
- Genre: Rock
- Length: 59:02
- Label: Solid Rockhouse
- Producer: Tom Greenwood, Andy Powell & Joe Crabtree

Wishbone Ash chronology
Elegant Stealth (2011)	Blue Horizon (2014)	Coat of Arms (2020)

Blue Horizon is the twenty-second studio album by rock band Wishbone Ash, released by Solid Rock Records on Intergroove in 2014.

It features the dual lead guitars of Powell and Muddy Manninen. It was produced by Tom Greenwood, Andy Powell and Joe Crabtree.

Blue Horizon has received a number of positive reviews.

== Track listing ==
1. "Take It Back" (Aynsley Powell) - 6:01
2. "Deep Blues" (Muddy Manninen / Ian Harris, Andy Powell, Joe Crabtree) - 5:28
3. "Strange How Things Come Back Around" (Roger Filgate) - 6:01
4. "Being One" (Manninen, Crabtree, Tom Greenwood / Harris, Crabtree, Greenwood, Andy Powell) - 5:07
5. "Way Down South" (Harris, Andy Powell) - 6:45
6. "Tally Ho!" (Manninen / Harris) - 4:46
7. "Mary Jane" (Manninen / Harris) - 4:38
8. "American Century" (Aynsley Powell / Andy Powell, Crabtree) - 5:07
9. "Blue Horizon" (Manninen / Harris) - 7:45
10. "All There Is to Say" (Pat McManus, Wishbone Ash / Andy Powell) - 7:24

== Personnel ==
=== Wishbone Ash ===
- Andy Powell - guitar, lead vocals
- Muddy Manninen - guitar, backing vocals; lead vocals on "Mary Jane"
- Bob Skeat - bass, backing vocals
- Joe Crabtree - drums, percussion, backing vocals; guitar solo (outro) on "Take It Back".

=== Additional musicians ===
- Pat McManus - fiddle on "Take It Back" and "All There Is to Say", bouzouki on "All There Is to Say"
- Lucy Underhill - backing vocals on "Strange How Things Come Back Around", additional vocals on "American Century"
- Richard Young - percussion on "Strange How Things Come Back Around"
- Tom Greenwood - organ on "Blue Horizon"

== Charts ==
Chart (2014)	Peak position
German Albums (Offizielle Top 100)	74
UK Independent Albums (OCC)	45
