= Trance Visionary =

1998 album by Wishbone Ash

Studio album by Wishbone Ash
- Released: April 1998
- Genre: Electronic, trance
- Length: 61:54 (87:10 with bonus CD)
- Label: Invisible Hands Music
- Producer: Mike Bennett

Wishbone Ash chronology
Illuminations (1996)	Trance Visionary (1998)	Live Timeline (1997)

Trance Visionary is an electronic-based dance studio album by rock band Wishbone Ash recorded during 1996. Their 18th overall. It features techno and dance collaborations between band leader Andy Powell and electronica guru Mike Bennett.

The album received mixed reactions among Wishbone Ash fans upon its release but became a hit in underground dance circles: several of the songs appeared on the Top 100 dance charts in the United Kingdom. It featured Powell alongside brand new members guitarist Mark Birch and bassist Bob Skeat, as well as returning drummer Ray Weston.

Early editions featured a "Limited Edition Bonus CD" featuring 4 remixes of tracks on the album.

== Track listing ==
1. "Numerology" - 6:54
2. "Wonderful Stash" - 7:17
3. "Heritage" - 3:07
4. "Interfaze" - 0:29
5. "Powerbright (Black & White Screen)" - 4:11
6. "Remnants of a Paranormal Menagerie" - 1:25
7. "Narcissus Visionary" - 7:57
8. "Trance Visionary" - 6:47
9. "Flutterby" - 5:35
10. "Banner Headlines" - 5:02
11. "The Loner" - 2:37
12. "Powerbright Volition" - 1:45
13. "Gutterfly" - 1:24
14. "Wronged by Righteousness" - 7:24

Bonus CD

1. "Heritage (Remix)" - 5:09
2. "Powerbright" - 4:53
3. "Dub - Visionary" - 6:04
4. "Wronged by Righteousness (Remix)" - 9:10

== Personnel ==
Wishbone Ash

- Andy Powell – guitar, vocals
- Mark Birch – guitar, vocals
- Bob Skeat – bass
- Ray Weston – drums

== Charts ==
Chart (1998)	Peak position
UK Independent Albums (OCC)	47
