= Coat of Arms (Wishbone Ash album) =

Studio album by British rock band Wishbone Ash

Studio album by Wishbone Ash
- Released: 28 February 2020
- Recorded: Late 2019
- Studio: Cross Stix Studios, Lancashire, England
- Genre: Rock
- Length: 58:51
- Label: Steamhammer/SPV

Wishbone Ash chronology
Blue Horizon (2014)	Coat of Arms (2020)

Singles from Coat of Arms
- 1. "We Stand as One" Released: 10 January 2020

Coat of Arms is the 23rd studio album by British rock band Wishbone Ash. It was released on 28 February 2020 by SPV GmbH on Steamhammer. It is also the final Wishbone Ash studio album to feature longtime drummer Joe Crabtree, who left the band in January 2022 to be replaced by Mike Truscott.

== Track listing ==
Coat of Arms track listing
No.	Title	Writer(s)	Length
1.	"We Stand as One"	Andy Powell, Aynsley Powell, Mark Abrahams	4:15
2.	"Coat of Arms"	Andy Powell, Aynsley Powell	7:55
3.	"Empty Man"	Andy Powell, Pauline Powell, Mark Abrahams	5:16
4.	"Floreana"	Andy Powell, Aynsley Powell, Mark Abrahams	5:14
5.	"Drive"	Andy Powell, Pauline Powell, Mark Abrahams, Aynsley Powell, Joe Crabtree	4:55
6.	"It's Only You I See"	Andy Powell, Pauline Powell, Mark Abrahams, Aynsley Powell	7:35
7.	"Too Cool for AC"	Andy Powell, Pauline Powell, Mark Abrahams, Aynsley Powell	4:50
8.	"Back in the Day"	Andy Powell, Pauline Powell, Aynsley Powell	4:46
9.	"Déjà-Vu"	Andy Powell, Pauline Powell, Mark Abrahams, Aynsley Powell	4:07
10.	"When the Love Is Shared"	Andy Powell, Pauline Powell, Aynsley Powell	4:21
11.	"Personal Halloween"	Andy Powell, Pauline Powell, Mark Abrahams	5:37
Total length:			58:51

== Charts ==
Sales chart performance for Coat of Arms
Chart (2020)	Peak position
German Albums (Offizielle Top 100)	22
Polish Albums (ZPAV)	50
Scottish Albums (OCC)	39
Swiss Albums (Schweizer Hitparade)	26
UK Independent Albums (OCC)	9
US Top Album Sales (Billboard)	97
