= There's the Rub =

1974 studio album by Wishbone Ash

Studio album by Wishbone Ash
- Released: November 1974
- Recorded: August – September 1974
- Studios: Criteria Recording Studios, Miami, Florida, US
- Genre: Hard rock
- Length: 38.40
- Label: MCA
- Producer: Bill Szymczyk

Wishbone Ash chronology
Live Dates (1973)	There's the Rub (1974)	Locked In (1976)

Professional ratings
Review scores
Source	Rating
Allmusic	3/5 stars
Christgau's Record Guide	D+

There's the Rub is the fifth studio album by rock band Wishbone Ash. It is the first album to feature guitarist-vocalist Laurie Wisefield, who would be a major part of the band's creative direction for the next 11 years. It also marked a change in sound. It was the band's first album to be recorded in America and was produced by Bill Szymczyk. Although the trademark twin guitars were still evident, the album had a more "American" feel with a smoother production sound. After the disappointing critical response to the previous studio album, Wishbone Four, reviews for There's The Rub were much more positive.

The title is taken from Shakespeare's Hamlet; "To sleep—perchance to dream: ay, there's the rub."

The track "F.U.B.B." caused controversy upon the album's release because of the acronym's meaning ("Fucked Up Beyond Belief"). Moreover, the haunting ballad "Persephone" would go on to become one of the band's most popular live songs. The lyric of "Lady Jay" is based on the Dartmoor folk legend about Kitty Jay.

The cover art designed by Hipgnosis shows a cricketer rubbing (in effect, polishing) a cricket ball on his trousers, leaving a mark – a common practice by fast bowlers who do so to make one side of the leather ball shinier than the other. This helps the ball to swing as it travels through the air after being bowled, so making it harder for the batsman to play it.

The album peaked at No. 16 in the UK Albums Chart.

== Track listing ==
All songs composed by Wishbone Ash

1. "Silver Shoes" – 6:35
2. "Don't Come Back" – 5:08
3. "Persephone" – 7:00
4. "Hometown" – 4:46
5. "Lady Jay" – 5.49
6. "F.U.B.B." – 9:22

== Personnel ==
Wishbone Ash

- Martin Turner – bass, lead vocals
- Andy Powell – acoustic and electric guitars, backing vocals, mandolin
- Laurie Wisefield – acoustic, electric and steel guitars, backing vocals, banjo
- Steve Upton – drums, percussion

Additional personnel

- Albhy Galuten – organ (3), synthesizers (3)
- Nelson Flaco Padron – congas (6)

== Charts ==
Chart (1974–75)	Peak position
Australian Albums (Kent Music Report)	67
Canada Top Albums/CDs (RPM)	100
German Albums (Offizielle Top 100)	43
New Zealand Albums (RMNZ)	28
UK Albums (Official Charts)	16
US Billboard 200	88

== Certifications ==
Region	Certification	Certified units/sales
United Kingdom (BPI)	Silver	60,000^{^}
^{^} Shipments figures based on certification alone.
