= Laurie Wisefield =

British musician

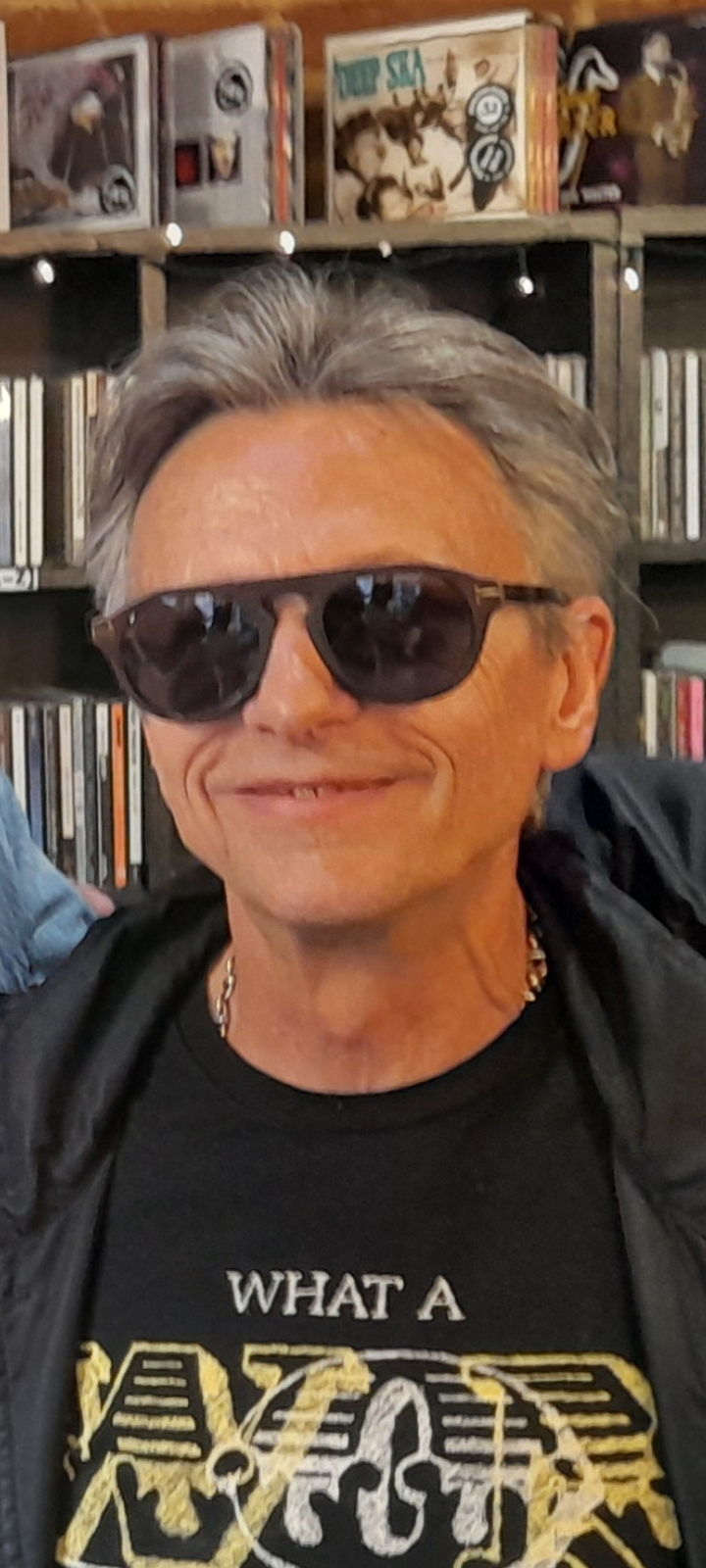
- Wisefield in 2024

Background information
- Born: Laurence Mark Wisefield; 27 August 1952 (age 73); London, England
- Genres: Rock; hard rock; progressive rock; art rock
- Occupation: Musician
- Instruments: Guitar; vocals
- Years active: 1970s–present
- Member of: Snakecharmer
- Formerly of: Wishbone Ash; Home
- Website: lauriewisefield.com

Laurence Mark Wisefield (born 27 August 1952) is an English guitarist and vocalist, best known for his contributions to Wishbone Ash during the 1970s and 1980s.

== Early life ==
Wisefield took up guitar when he was eight after his grandfather bought him an acoustic guitar for £6. He studied art at college and worked as a jewellery designer after graduating.

== Career ==
Prior to his stint in Wishbone Ash, Wisefield performed with the progressive rock band, Home. The group released three albums through Columbia Records between 1971 and 1974. Another member of Home, Cliff Williams, went on to find fame with AC/DC.

Wisefield joined Wishbone Ash prior in May 1974 to their album There's the Rub. He eventually left in December 1985 following the release of Raw to the Bone. Following his departure from Wishbone Ash, Wisefield went on to perform with Tina Turner, Joe Cocker and Roger Chapman. He joined Tina Turner as a member of her touring band in 1987, performing with her for fourteen months.

In 2002, Wisefield joined the musical cast of We Will Rock You. As well as performing live with the musical, Wisefield appeared on the 2002 cast recording, and accompanied the performance at the 2002 Party at the Palace to celebrate the Golden Jubilee of Elizabeth II. Wisefield is currently a member of the band Snakecharmer, along with ex-members of Whitesnake and Thunder.

== Discography ==
=== With Home ===
- Pause for a Hoarse Horse (1971)
- Home (1972)
- The Alchemist (1973)

=== With Wishbone Ash ===
- There's the Rub (1974)
- Locked In (1976)
- New England (1976)
- Front Page News (1977)
- No Smoke Without Fire (1978)
- Just Testing (1980)
- Number the Brave (1981)
- Twin Barrels Burning (1982)
- Raw to the Bone (1985)

=== With Snakecharmer ===
- Snakecharmer (2013)
- Second Skin (2017)
