= Wishbone Four =

1973 studio album by Wishbone Ash

Studio album by Wishbone Ash
- Released: 11 May 1973
- Recorded: February – March 1973
- Studios: Olympic and Apple, London, England
- Genre: Rock • hard rock • folk rock
- Length: 43.56
- Label: MCA
- Producer: Wishbone Ash

Wishbone Ash chronology
Live from Memphis (1972)	Wishbone Four (1973)	Live Dates (1973)

Professional ratings
Review scores
Source	Rating
Allmusic	4/5 stars

Wishbone Four is the fourth studio album by British rock band Wishbone Ash, released in 1973. It was a departure from their previous album, Argus, in that it lacked that recording's overall cohesion and atmosphere and the loose conceptual framework of a stately, pastoral and warring medieval England. Containing only hints of the extended twin-lead guitar harmonies, Wishbone Four's stylistic variety found its footing in acoustic folk elements in half of the eight-song set ("Ballad of the Beacon", "Everybody Needs a Friend", "Sorrel" and "Sing Out the Song"), two aggressive and melodic starters on each side of the vinyl release (Side 1: So Many Things to Say" and Side 2: "Doctor"), and the band's first use of horns on the semi-autobiographical "rave-up" touring song "No Easy Road".

Although the sombre, sensitive and rather more fragile acoustic songs contained the wistful intro elements that featured on the previous album, the lead guitars lacked the slow climb of the band's trademark duelling crescendos and energetic fretwork expected from the band at the time, tending to a more subtle and subdued interplay on the longer tracks. Wishbone Four was popular among fans upon its release as it implied musical growth and a willingness to experiment in the band's divergence of a successful formula (similar at the time to the effect of Led Zeppelin III's contrast to that band's previous efforts).

Wishbone Four was also the first release not produced by Derek Lawrence but by the band themselves. There's the Rub, the band's next and fifth studio album, was the first album to feature guitarist-vocalist Laurie Wisefield, who would be a major part of the band's creative direction for the next 11 years, as founding member Ted Turner left the band after the subsequent Wishbone Four tour.

The album peaked at No. 12 in the UK Albums Chart.

== Track listing ==
Music by Wishbone Ash;
Lyrics by Martin Turner, except "Rock 'n Roll Widow" by Steve Upton.

1. "So Many Things to Say" – 5:00
2. "Ballad of the Beacon" – 4.58
3. "No Easy Road" – 3:40
4. "Everybody Needs a Friend" – 8:53
5. "Doctor" – 5.48
6. "Sorrel" – 5:35
7. "Sing Out the Song" – 4:21
8. "Rock 'n Roll Widow" – 5:41

== Personnel ==
Wishbone Ash

- Ted Turner – lap-steel, 12 string, acoustic and electric guitars, backing vocals, lead vocals on "Rock N Roll Widow"
- Andy Powell – acoustic and electric guitars, backing vocals, lead vocals on "Ballad Of The Beacon"
- Martin Turner – bass guitar, lead vocals
- Steve Upton – drums and percussion

Additional personnel

- George Nash – keyboards on "Everybody Needs a Friend"
- Graham Maitland – piano on "No Easy Road"
- Phil Kenzie, Dave Coxhill and Bud Parks – horn section on "No Easy Road"

== Charts ==
Chart (1973)	Peak position
Australian Albums (Kent Music Report)	44
Canada Top Albums/CDs (RPM)	41
Finnish Albums (The Official Finnish Charts)	26
Norwegian Albums (VG-lista)	13
UK Albums (Official Charts)	12
US Billboard 200	44

== Certifications ==
Region	Certification	Certified units/sales
United Kingdom (BPI)	Silver	60,000^{^}
^{^} Shipments figures based on certification alone.
