= Argus (album) =

1972 album by Wishbone Ash

Studio album by Wishbone Ash
- Released: 28 April 1972
- Recorded: January–March 1972
- Studios: De Lane Lea, London, England
- Genre: Progressive rock • folk rock • hard rock
- Length: 44:43 76:55 (2002 reissue)
- Label: Decca/MCA
- Producer: Derek Lawrence

Wishbone Ash chronology
Pilgrimage (1971)	Argus (1972)	Live from Memphis (1972)

Argus is the third album by the British rock band Wishbone Ash, released on 28 April 1972. It is their most commercially and critically successful album, peaking at No. 3 in the UK Albums Chart.

== Recording ==
Although not intended as a concept album, the album is themed around the medieval period and Greek mythology, particularly on the second side. The album features a blend of progressive rock, folk, and hard rock, and is considered a landmark album in the progression of twin-lead guitar harmonisation, later adopted by bands such as Thin Lizzy, Judas Priest and Iron Maiden. The sound engineer on Argus was Martin Birch, who also worked with Deep Purple, later with Black Sabbath, Iron Maiden and other hard rock bands. The bulk of the lyrics were provided by bassist/lead vocalist Martin Turner, although all members are credited with the music and arrangements. The album was produced by Derek Lawrence.

== Artwork ==
The album cover was designed by Storm Thorgerson and Aubrey "Po" Powell of the album cover design company Hipgnosis, and it features a warrior overlooking a landscape at the Gorges du Verdon in Provence, France as a spaceship emerges. The warrior's costume was borrowed from the wardrobe of Ken Russell’s 1971 film The Devils. Thorgerson and Powell had intended for the warrior to be holding a sword as well as a spear, and had rented the sword used in Roman Polanski's film Macbeth, also from 1971. However, while they were selecting a location for the shoot, the sword was stolen, so the photographs were taken without it. The person dressed as the warrior was an assistant at Hipgnosis, Bruce Atkins.

It is rumoured that the warrior is the main inspiration for the character design of Darth Vader in Star Wars. Andy Powell acknowledged this rumour although he could not confirm if it is true. The cover also prompted Jimmy Page of Led Zeppelin to contact Hipgnosis and ask them to design the cover for their 1973 album Houses of the Holy.

== Release ==
Argus was released on vinyl record on 28 April 1972. It was later released on CD in 2002, featuring a remix (by Martin Turner) of the original album as well as the three live tracks from the EP Live from Memphis promotional EP, recorded in the studios of WMC-FM.

In 2007, a 2-CD deluxe edition of Argus was released in Europe by Island Records. This included the 1972 mix as well as additional BBC Session tracks.

In 2008, Martin Turner released a new studio recording of Argus entitled Argus Through the Looking Glass. Wishbone Ash released a live version of the album, Argus "Then Again" Live.

== Critical reception ==
Professional ratings
Review scores
Source	Rating
AllMusic	4/5 stars
SputnikMusic	5/5 stars

Argus was named "Album of the Year" in the 1972 year-end issue of Sounds.

William Ruhlmann of AllMusic gave the album a rating of 4 out of 5 stars, praising the instrumentation and writing that "it set up the commercial breakthrough enjoyed by the band's next album, Wishbone Four, but over the years it came to be seen as the quintessential Wishbone Ash recording, the one that best realized the group's complex vision."

== Influence ==
In an interview with Guitar World in 2011, Steve Harris from Iron Maiden said "I think if anyone wants to understand Maiden's early thing, in particular the harmony guitars, all they have to do is listen to Wishbone Ash's Argus album."

== Track listing ==
All lyrics are written by Martin Turner except "Time Was" (Martin Turner and Ted Turner) and "Leaf and Stream" (Steve Upton). All lead vocals were performed by Martin Turner with Andy Powell, unless otherwise noted; all music is composed by Wishbone Ash

Side one
No.	Title	Lead vocals	Length
1.	"Time Was"	T. Turner, M. Turner	9:42
2.	"Sometime World"		6:55
3.	"Blowin' Free"	M. Turner, Powell, T. Turner	5:17

Side two
No.	Title	Lead vocals	Length
1.	"The King Will Come"		7:06
2.	"Leaf and Stream"	M. Turner	3:55
3.	"Warrior"		5:53
4.	"Throw Down the Sword"		5:55

Note: track timings on the gatefold sleeve of early editions are incorrect. For example, "Time Was" is listed as 9:00 and not the correct 9:42.

=== First reissue bonus tracks ===
Music by Wishbone Ash;
Lyrics by Martin Turner.

1. "No Easy Road" – 3:36

=== Live From Memphis EP bonus tracks ===
All songs composed by Wishbone Ash.

1. "Jail Bait" – 4:57
2. "The Pilgrim" – 10:10
3. "Phoenix" – 17:05

=== 2007 deluxe edition ===
Disc one

1. "Time Was"
2. "Sometime World"
3. "Blowin' Free"
4. "The King Will Come"
5. "Leaf and Stream"
6. "Warrior"
7. "Throw Down the Sword"
8. "No Easy Road"
9. "The Pilgrim" (live in Memphis 1972)
10. "Phoenix" (live in Memphis 1972)

Disc two

1. "Time Was" (BBC in concert session 1972)
2. "Blowin' Free" (BBC in concert session 1972)
3. "Warrior" (BBC in concert session 1972)
4. "Throw Down the Sword" (BBC in concert session 1972)
5. "King Will Come" (BBC in concert session 1972)
6. "Phoenix" (BBC in concert session 1972)
7. "Blowin' Free" (BBC session 1972)
8. "Throw Down The Sword" (BBC session 1972)

== Personnel ==
Wishbone Ash

- Martin Turner – bass guitar, vocals
- Andy Powell – lead (track 1, 2 [second passage], 3, 5, 6, 7), harmony lead, rhythm and acoustic guitars (stereo left), vocals
- Ted Turner – lead (track 2 [first passage], 3 [quiet passage], 4 and 6 [quiet passage]), slide (track 3), harmony lead, rhythm and acoustic guitars (stereo right), vocals
- Steve Upton – drums (all tracks except 5), percussion

Additional personnel

- John Tout – organ on "Throw Down The Sword"

== Charts ==
Chart (1972)	Peak position
Australian Albums (Kent Music Report)	49
Norwegian Albums (VG-lista)	21
UK Albums (Official Charts)	3
US Billboard 200	169

Chart (2023–2026)	Peak position
Greek Albums (IFPI)	34
Scottish Albums (Official Charts)	53
UK Independent Albums (Official Charts)	21
UK Rock & Metal Albums (Official Charts)	10

== Certifications ==
Region	Certification	Certified units/sales
United Kingdom (BPI)	Gold	100,000^{^}
^{^} Shipments figures based on certification alone.
