= Front Page News =

1977 studio album by Wishbone Ash

Studio album by Wishbone Ash
- Released: October 7, 1977
- Genres: Rock, soft rock
- Length: 42:01
- Label: MCA
- Producers: Ron Albert, Howard Albert

Wishbone Ash chronology
Classic Ash (1977)	Front Page News (1977)	No Smoke Without Fire (1978)

Front Page News is the eighth album by rock band Wishbone Ash. It peaked at No. 31 in the UK Albums Chart.

== Critical reception ==
Professional ratings
Review scores
Source	Rating
AllMusic	3/5 stars

The Leader-Post deemed the album "stylish and polished" and "gentle, light rock."

== Track listing ==
All songs written and composed by Martin Turner, Andy Powell, Laurie Wisefield and Steve Upton; except where noted.

Side one

1. "Front Page News" – 5:08
2. "Midnight Dancer" – 4:24
3. "Goodbye Baby Hello Friend" (Wisefield) – 3:51
4. "Surface to Air" (Turner) – 4:49
5. "714" (Wisefield) – 3:19

Side two

1. "Come in from the Rain" (Turner) – 4:38
2. "Right or Wrong" (Turner) – 2:50
3. "Heart-Beat" (Turner) – 4:21
4. "The Day I Found Your Love" – 4:27
5. "Diamond Jack" – 4:17

== Personnel ==
- Martin Turner – bass guitar, lead vocals except "Goodbye Baby Hello Friend"
- Andy Powell – lead, rhythm and acoustic guitars, mandolin, vocals
- Laurie Wisefield – lead, 12 string and rhythm guitars, lead vocal on "Goodbye Baby Hello Friend"
- Steve Upton – drums

== Charts ==
Chart (1977)	Peak position
UK Albums (Official Charts)	31
US Billboard 200	166
