= Martin Turner =

English musician (born 1947)

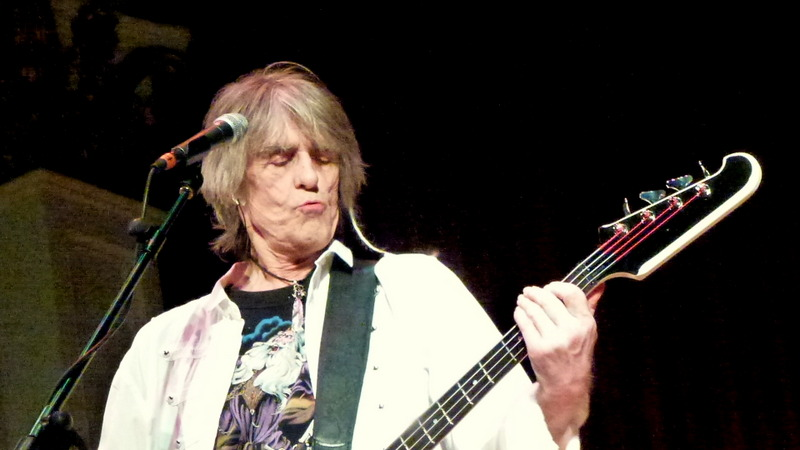
- Turner performing in 2015

Background information
- Born: Martin Robert Turner; 1 October 1947 (age 79); Torquay, Devon, England
- Genres: Rock; hard rock; progressive rock; art rock
- Occupations: Singer–songwriter; musician
- Instruments: Bass guitar; vocals
- Years active: 1963–present
- Labels: Dirty Dog Discs, Mystic
- Website: www.martinturnermusic.com

Turner's voice
recorded February 2014

Martin Robert Turner (born 1 October 1947) is an English musician best known for his time as the bass guitarist, lead vocalist and a founding member of the rock band, Wishbone Ash. Turner is now the lead singer and bassist for "Martin Turner Ex-Wishbone Ash".

== Early life ==
Turner was born in Torquay. He started playing guitar as a child and switched to bass at age fourteen. Turner formed his first band, The Torinoes, in 1963 with his brother Glenn.

== Career ==
=== The Empty Vessels ===
By 1966, the band had formed into The Empty Vessels and included Steve Upton on drums. In 1969, Empty Vessels released their only single "My Son John / Low Toby", which was released on the German label, Metronome and produced by Guy Fletcher. They also briefly toured as "Tanglewood" before disbanding.

=== Wishbone Ash ===
In 1969, his brother Glenn left the trio and Turner and Upton were briefly a duo. Writing both guitar and bass, Turner would translate his vocal harmonies on guitar, which inspired him to include the twin guitar sound the band is best known for, leading him to hire Andy Powell and Ted Turner (not related to Martin) in 1969.

With this four-member lineup, the band changed their name to Wishbone Ash. Turner remained with them until 1980, during which time he was a songwriter and creative force within the band. He played on their first ten albums, which includes the album Argus to which he also contributed vocals as well as the bulk of the album's lyrics.

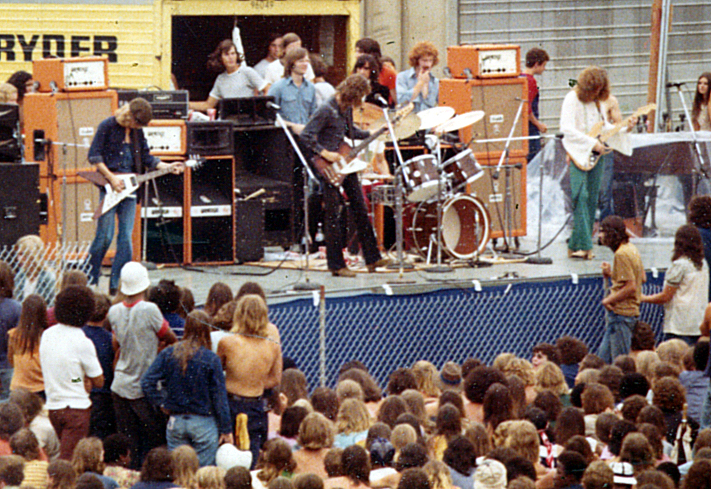
Wishbone Ash in America 1972 Turner is front and centre

In 1980, a decision by the rest of Wishbone Ash to introduce a frontman led to Turner parting company with Wishbone Ash. The frontman never appeared and Turner was replaced by John Wetton, who was formerly with King Crimson, Uriah Heep, Family and Roxy Music

In 1987 the original quartet reformed, and Turner produced and performed on the albums Nouveau Calls, Here to Hear and Strange Affair as well as undertaking worldwide touring with the band between 1988 and 1991. In late 1991 Wishbone Ash decided to continue without Turner. He did, however, perform with Wishbone Ash again on several occasions, including the band's 25th anniversary celebrations in 1995–96, and the Ashcon event in November 1997. He has also been involved in the mixing and remastering of several back catalogue, compilation and archival Wishbone Ash CD titles.

In 1996, Turner released Walking the Reeperbahn, featuring material spanning the years 1981–1996.

=== Martin Turner's Wishbone Ash ===
In 2005, he formed a new band, Martin Turner's Wishbone Ash, to perform Wishbone Ash music. Their debut release, titled New Live Dates Vol.1 was released in 2006, followed by New Live Dates Vol. 2 in 2007. Both featured a guest appearance by original Wishbone Ash member Ted Turner.

Martin Turner's Wishbone Ash later released Argus: Through The Looking Glass, a 2008 re-recording of Wishbone Ash's album, and Life Begins Tour, a 2CD/DVD recording of a performance at Leicester Y Theatre in March 2010.

In 2013 Andy Powell took Turner to court in the UK over the name of his band. Turner had been out of Wishbone Ash since the 1990s and had resigned ownership of the band name. Powell believed the two Wishbone Ash names were causing confusion in the market and he wanted Turner to change his band name so it was clear Turner was a former member of Wishbone Ash and not fronting a spinoff of the group. Turner claimed that he wanted the registration to be declared invalid. Powell won the court case and Turner changed the name of his band to "Martin Turner Ex-Wishbone Ash", as it is still known today.

In 2015 Turner produced a new album, Written in the Stars, which reached number 16 in the UK Independent Breakers chart. In 2018, Turner's live album, Beauty of Chaos – Live at the Citadel reached number 35 in the UK Rock & Metal Chart.

In 2025 he is still touring and performing classic Wishbone Ash songs from the back catalogue under the name "Martin Turner Ex Wishbone Ash". His current band consists of guitarists Danny Willson (former member of Showaddywaddy) and Misha Nikolic. Sonny Flint (son of Hughie Flint) played drums with the band from June 2022 until his departure in November 2024. Tim Brown rejoined on drums in 2025, but passed away in August 2026. He was replaced by original MTWA drummer Rob Hewins.

=== Solo work and production ===
Turner went on to a career in studio management and record production in the 1980s and also formed his own band The Wolfgang (also known as Bamboo and Martin Turner's Stolen Face). The Wolfgang recorded new material, some of which was later reworked into new Wishbone Ash songs after he rejoined the band, while other songs appeared on Turner's solo album, Walking The Reeperbahn, in 1996.

Turner penned his first autobiography, Martin Turner No Easy Road : My Life and Times with Wishbone Ash and beyond, which details Turner's career in Wishbone Ash.

== Instruments ==
Turner was known for playing a Jetglo Rickenbacker 4001 bass guitar during Wishbone Ash's early albums by 1972. Martin had by the release of their third album Argus been playing a Gibson Thunderbird bass guitar. He has also regularly performed with a Hamer bass, and a white model of the Gibson Thunderbird which he bought from Peter Overend Watts of Mott the Hoople.

== Discography ==
Wishbone Ash

- Wishbone Ash (1970)
- Pilgrimage (1971)
- Argus (1972)
- Wishbone Four (1973)
- There's the Rub (1974)
- Locked In (1976)
- New England (1976)
- Front Page News (1977)
- No Smoke Without Fire (1978)
- Just Testing (1980)
- Nouveau Calls (1987)
- Here to Hear (1989)
- Strange Affair (1991)

Studio albums:

- Walking the Reeperbahn (1996)
- Argus Through the Looking Glass (2008)
- Written in the Stars (2015) as 'Martin Turner, founding original member of Wishbone Ash'

Live-recordings:

- New Live Dates Volume 1 (2006)
- New Live Dates Volume 2 (2007)
- Life Begins 2CD (2011)
- The Garden Party - A Celebration of Wishbone Ash Music 2CD (2014)

Recorded live at Liscombe Park Buckinghamshire, 31 August 2012

- The Beauty of Chaos (2018)

DVDs

- The Life Begins Tour (Live in Leicester 2010) (2011)

Other

- "My Son John / Low Toby" (1969 single with The Empty Vessels)
