= Ted Turner (guitarist) =

British guitarist (b. 1950)

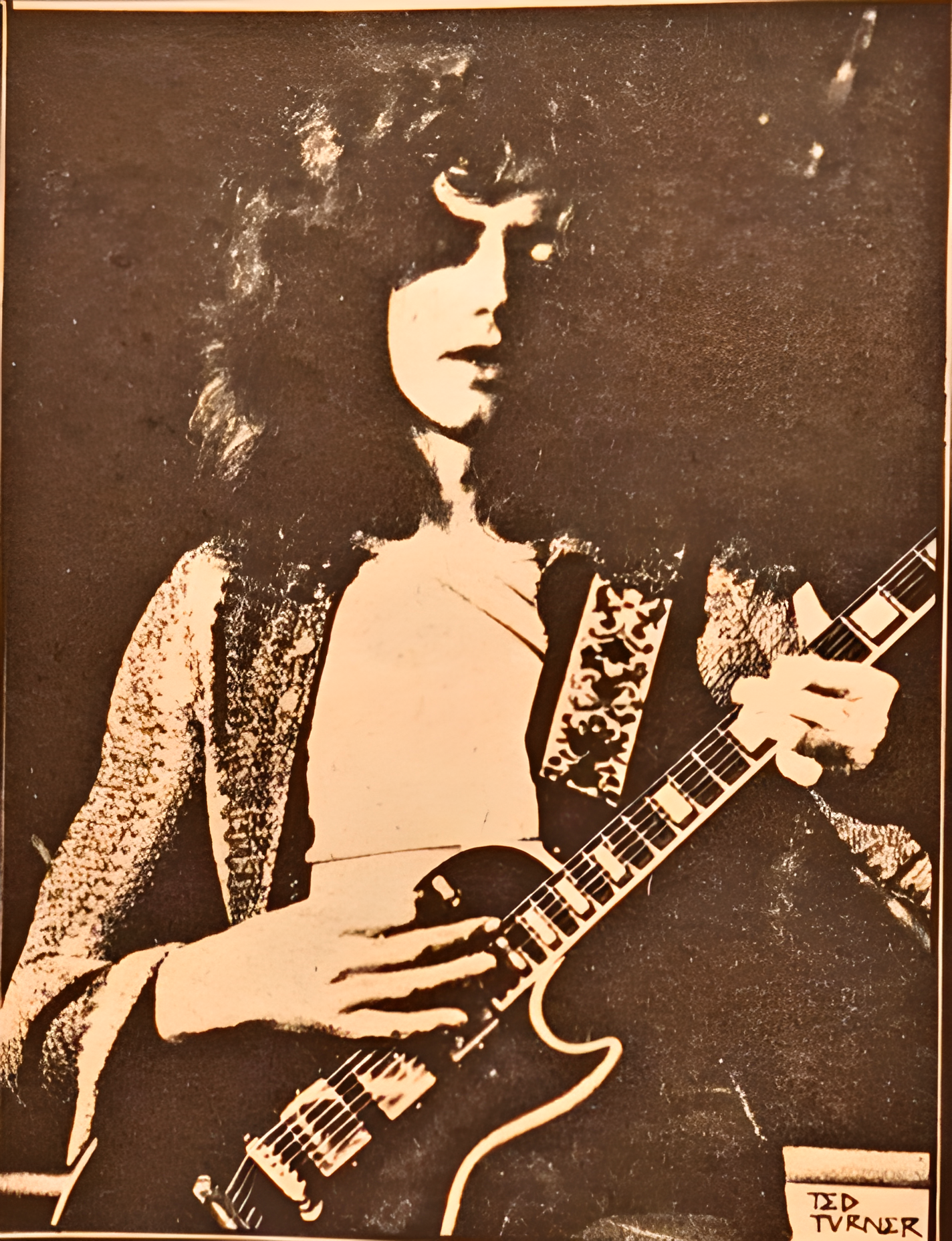
- Turner in 1969

Background information
- Born: David Alan Turner; 2 August 1950 (age 75); Birmingham, England
- Genres: Rock, progressive rock, blues, art rock, new age soul
- Occupation: Musician
- Instruments: Guitar, vocals
- Years active: 1969–present
- Website: tedturnerandmajella.com

David Alan "Ted" Turner (born 2 August 1950) is an English guitarist and vocalist, best known for his work with the rock band Wishbone Ash, in which he was famed for his twin lead guitar instrumental arrangements with Andy Powell. Turner also contributed lap steel guitar to a variety of Wishbone Ash recordings.

== Early life ==
David Alan Turner was born in Sheldon a small area in east Birmingham. His family located to Lydney, Gloucestershire but returned to Birmingham when Turner was eight. He started playing guitar at age sixteen, inspired by the British blues scene and cited Peter Green of Fleetwood Mac, and the band Cream as influences. Turner lived in South Yardley until he was 19 years old, when he moved to London to work as a professional musician.

== Career ==
Prior to Wishbone Ash, Turner played with the Birmingham band, King Biscuit. In 1969, he unsuccessfully auditioned to join Colosseum.

Turner joined Wishbone Ash in 1969 after answering an advertisement in an issue of Melody Maker magazine published by Martin Turner. He and Andy Powell became known for their twin lead guitar playing. Extensive touring followed, whilst also recording the albums Wishbone Ash, Pilgrimage, and Argus. He left the band after their fourth album, Wishbone Four, in 1974.

In 1971, Turner was invited to play on John Lennon's Imagine, on "Crippled Inside" and "How Do You Sleep", playing acoustic guitar on both tracks. Other sessions included those for Cilla Black, George Harrison and Al Stewart.

After leaving Wishbone Ash, Turner moved to the United States and spent most of the late 1970s and early 1980s performing in local bands.

In 1980, Turner returned to England and did studio work with Stewart Copeland, Gene October, and Brian James. The next year found him once again in the United States, where he married and formed a new band called Choice. Choice featured Greg Cook (guitars, keyboards, and vocals), Robbie Hewlett (bass guitar) and Bobby Dean Wickland (drums). In 1982, Turner joined Joey Molland's Badfinger and toured the country with them.

From 1983 to 1985, Turner was involved in various recording projects. In 1985 he moved to Chicago, recorded with various artistes including Sugar Blue.

In 1987, he rejoined Wishbone Ash and with them recorded Nouveau Calls for Miles Copeland III's No Speak label. In the spring of 1988, the original Wishbone Ash toured England and Europe for the first time in 15 years, and in the autumn of that year, Turner and Andy Powell were invited to join Copeland's Night of the Guitar Tour. That group included such guitarists as Randy California, Peter Haycock, Steve Howe, Steve Hunter, Robby Krieger, Leslie West, Alvin Lee and Jan Akkerman.

Turner sometimes appears as a special guest in "Martin Turner Ex-Wishbone Ash", a version of the band fronted by original Wishbone Ash lead singer/bassist Martin Turner (no relation), including in 2012 in Birmingham to celebrate 40 years since the release of the original band's debut album Wishbone Ash.

He and his wife Majella have released two albums, Better Together (2017) and Divine Timing (2020).

== Personal life ==
In 1994, his eleven year-old son Kipp was killed by a drunk driver in Scottsdale, Arizona. A campaign by Ted and his family led to a change in the Arizona sentencing laws for drunk drivers. He married his wife Majella, an English singer and actress, in February 2014. They lived together in Phoenix, Arizona before moving to Sedona, Arizona in June 2023.

== Recognition ==
He has been voted one of Rolling Stone's 'Top Twenty Rock Guitarists of All Time', and named by Traffic magazine as "one of the most important guitarists in rock history".

== Discography ==
Wishbone Ash

- Wishbone Ash (1970)
- Pilgrimage (1971)
- Argus (1972)
- Wishbone Four (1973)
- Nouveau Calls (1987)
- Here to Hear (1989)
- Strange Affair (1991)

Solo

- Eclektic Value (2010)

With Majella Turner

- Better Together (2017)
- Divine Timing (2020)
