= Wishbone Ash =

British rock band

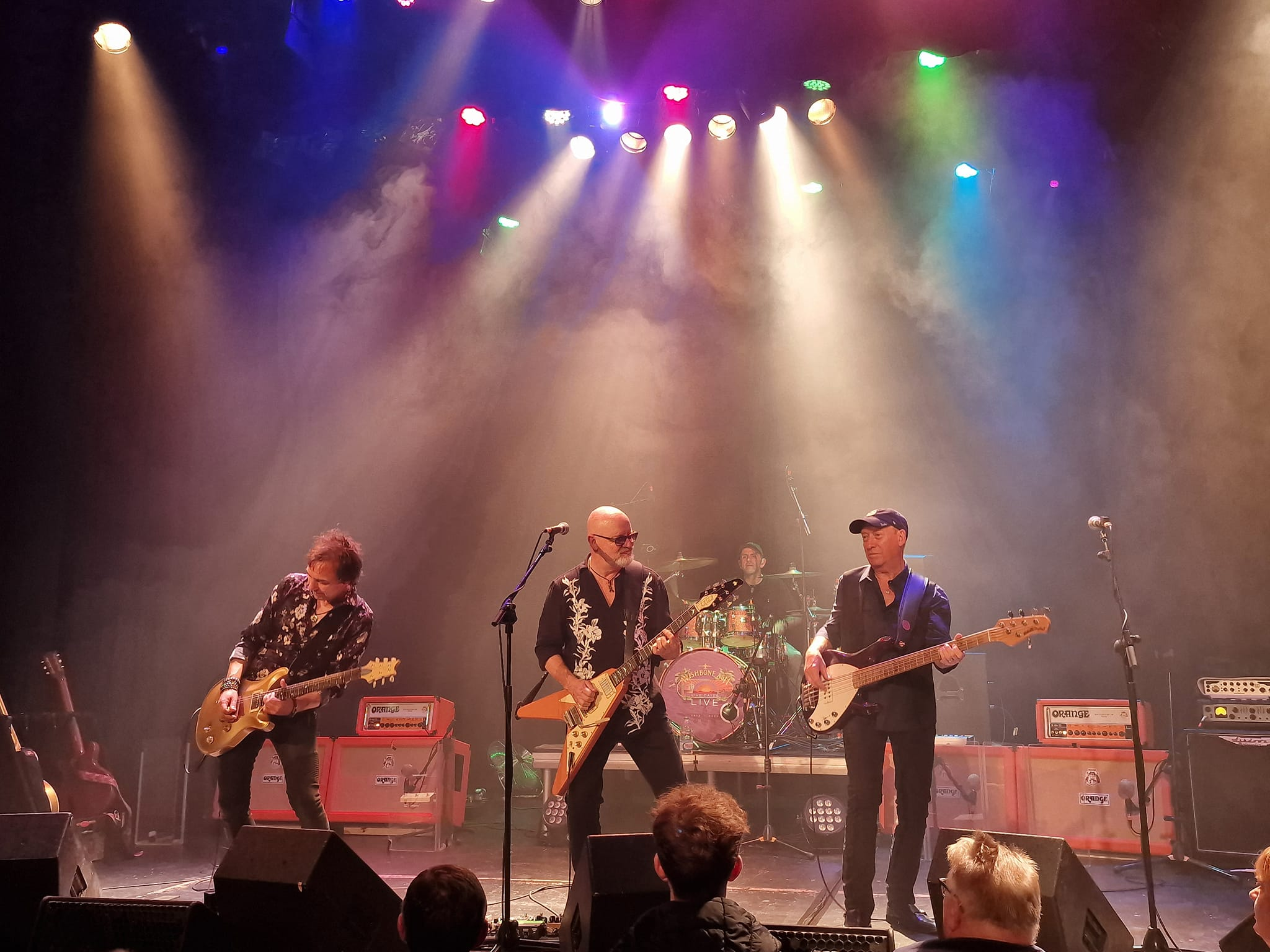
- Wishbone Ash in Pontardawe, 2023

Background information
- Origin: Torquay, Devon, England
- Genres: Hard rock; blues rock; folk rock; progressive rock; jazz fusion
- Years active: 1969–present
- Labels: MCA; AVM; Neat; IRS; Invisible Hands Music; Permanent; Talking Elephant; Decca; Steamhammer/SPV
- Members: Andy Powell; Bob Skeat; Mark Abrahams; Windsor McGilvray
- Past members: Ted Turner; Martin Turner; Steve Upton; Laurie Wisefield; List of Wishbone Ash members
- Website: www.wishboneashofficial.com

Wishbone Ash are a British rock band who achieved success in the early to mid-1970s.

Wishbone Ash are noted for their extensive use of harmony twin lead guitars, which had been attracting electric blues bands since Jeff Beck and Jimmy Page had played together in the Yardbirds in 1966. Their contributions helped Andy Powell and Ted Turner to be voted "Two of the Ten Most Important Guitarists in Rock History" (Traffic magazine 1989). Melody Maker (1972) described Powell and Turner as "the most interesting two-guitar team since the days when Beck and Page graced The Yardbirds". Several notable bands have cited Wishbone Ash as an influence, including Eagles, Judas Priest, Iron Maiden, Van Halen, Lynyrd Skynyrd, Thin Lizzy, Metallica, Dream Theater, Overkill and Opeth.

Formed in Torquay, Devon in 1969 out of the ashes of the trio The Empty Vessels (originally known as The Torinoes, later briefly being renamed Tanglewood in 1969), which had been formed by Wishbone Ash's founding member and creative force Martin Turner (lead vocals and bass guitar) in 1963 and complemented by Steve Upton (drums and percussion) in 1966. Wishbone Ash formed when Martin Turner and Steve Upton set up auditions for a guitarist and subsequently ended up with two guitarists because they could not decide between the two. So as a result, guitarists/vocalists Andy Powell and Ted Turner completed the original Wishbone Ash line-up. In 1974 Ted Turner left the band, and was replaced by Laurie Wisefield. The band continued on with strong critical and commercial success until 1980. There followed line-ups featuring former bass players from King Crimson (John Wetton), Uriah Heep (Trevor Bolder) and Trapeze (Mervyn Spence). Wisefield left in 1985. In 1987, however, the original line-up reunited for several albums – Nouveau Calls, Here to Hear and Strange Affair – until 1990, when Upton quit the band. After Martin Turner was replaced in 1991, the band recorded The Ash Live in Chicago, before Ted Turner left again in January 1994. This left Andy Powell as the sole remaining original founding member of Wishbone Ash to continue the band on into the future.

== History ==
=== Formation and rise to fame (1969–1980) ===
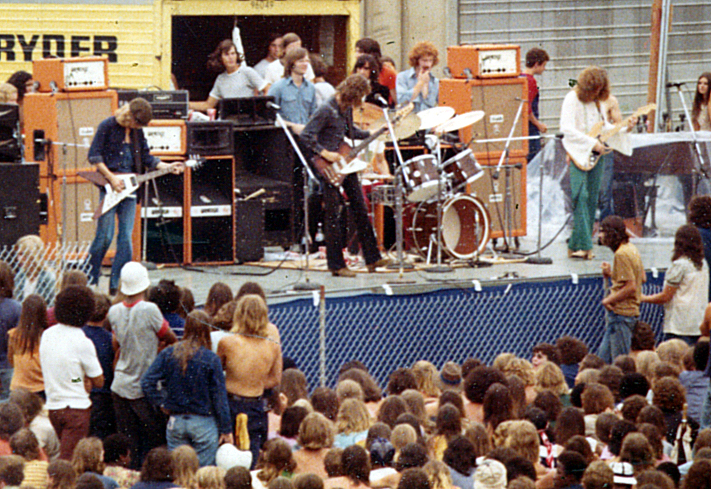
Wishbone Ash on stage in Charlotte, North Carolina, US, in 1972

Wishbone Ash was formed in October 1969 by bass guitarist Martin Turner and drummer Steve Upton. When Tanglewood's original guitarist, Martin's brother Glenn Turner, left the trio and returned to his native Devon, their manager, Miles Copeland III, advertised for a guitar player and also for a keyboard player. After an extensive search for a guitarist, the band could not decide between the final two candidates, Andy Powell and Ted Turner (no relation to Martin). It was suggested that they try both guitar players "just to see what it sounds like". Differing from the twin lead sound of Southern rock pioneer The Allman Brothers Band, Wishbone Ash included strong elements of progressive rock, and also of folk and classical music. After the band members wrote several suggested band names on two sheets of paper, Martin Turner picked one word from each list – 'Wishbone' and 'Ash'.

In early 1970, the band secured an opening spot for Deep Purple. Its guitarist, Ritchie Blackmore, later recommended Wishbone Ash to producer Derek Lawrence, as well as helping them secure a record deal with Decca/MCA Records.

The band's debut album, Wishbone Ash, was released in December 1970. One year later, the group released Pilgrimage and the band peaked commercially in 1972 with Argus, their highest placed entry in the UK Albums Chart (#3). The album was voted by the readers of Sounds as the "best rock album of the year", also "Top British Album" (Melody Maker). The band were getting international acclaim for their live performances as they gained popularity around the world.

Wishbone Ash had now begun to play major arenas as headliners. Wishbone Four (1973) was the band's first record without producer Derek Lawrence, as the band decided to produce the album themselves, and in December 1973 the band released a double live album, Live Dates. There had already been an album released called Wishbone Ash Live in Memphis, which was a promo to FM radio stations but never sold in stores.

In May 1974 guitarist Ted Turner, burned out by the group's constant touring, decided to leave the band. After replacing Turner with guitarist Laurie Wisefield (ex-Home), the band relocated to the US and recorded There's the Rub (1974).

Locked In (1976), produced by Tom Dowd, saw the band moving towards US soft-rock territory and the group began touring with a keyboard player, Graham Maitland, who had previously guested with the group on a few shows and contributed to Wishbone Four.

1976's New England returned to the traditional Wishbone Ash style and Front Page News (1977) was the band's last album of this period that was recorded in the US. By 1978, after years of experimental albums, the band decided to return to its roots with No Smoke Without Fire, the first to be produced by Derek Lawrence since Argus in 1972. The album contained mainly songs written by Laurie Wisefield and Martin Turner.

The band spent six months making the next album, Just Testing, which was released in February 1980. Pressured by MCA to make more commercial music, Andy Powell, Laurie Wisefield and Steve Upton expressed to bassist/vocalist Martin Turner that they planned to recruit a lead singer/frontman, thus restricting Martin Turner's duties to bass guitar only. Turner felt unable to support such plans and described the position he was being put in as "untenable". Following a band meeting at his house in October 1980 (just prior to the release of their Live Dates 2 album), Martin Turner parted company with the band. Ironically, the band never recruited the proposed frontman and Turner, in his 2012 autobiography, described the situation as "constructive dismissal". However this was not a view held by the rest of the remaining band members or the then management.

=== Line-up changes (1981–1986) ===
Turner was replaced by bassist and vocalist John Wetton, formerly of Family, King Crimson, Roxy Music, Uriah Heep and U.K. Number the Brave was released in April 1981 and featured Wetton's lead vocals on just one song, although during album sessions he had offered songs such as "Here Comes the Feeling" that would eventually sell millions when released on Asia's 1982 debut album. Discouraged, Wetton did not continue with Wishbone Ash beyond the album sessions and instead co-founded Asia.

Wetton was replaced on the Number the Brave tour by the former Uriah Heep bassist Trevor Bolder. Also joining the band was female backing vocalist, Claire Hamill, who had sung on both the Just Testing and Number the Brave albums.

In 1982, after Hamill's departure, the band experimented with heavy metal on the Twin Barrels Burning album. It became the highest charting Wishbone Ash album in years (UK #22).

Bolder left the group to rejoin Uriah Heep in April 1983, to be replaced by bassist/vocalist Mervyn Spence (ex-Trapeze). The group continued with a rock side on 1985's Raw to the Bone, which became the first Wishbone Ash album not to make the charts. Not long after, Wisefield left after serving as guitarist in the band for eleven years, going on to a varied career that would include work with Tina Turner, Joe Cocker, Roger Chapman, Jeff Wayne and the Queen musical We Will Rock You. He was replaced by Jamie Crompton, who in turn was succeeded briefly in 1986 by Phil Palmer, after which, Crompton returned. Early in 1986, Mervyn Spence quit as well, to be replaced by ex-Kinks bassist Andy Pyle.

=== Reunions and departures (1987–1994) ===
At the start of 1987, I.R.S. Records founder and original Wishbone manager Miles Copeland III began a series of albums entitled No Speak, which featured all instrumental music. To launch the label successfully, Copeland needed a big name band that would bring publicity to the project. Copeland approached the four founding members of Wishbone Ash about having the original line-up record an all-instrumental album. Beginning in May 1987, for the first time in fourteen years, Andy Powell and Steve Upton joined forces with Martin Turner and Ted Turner to record the album.

In the meantime, previously booked concerts were covered by the Powell/Upton/Crompton/Pyle lineup, including a show in May 1987 in Sun City in South Africa, where the band had been advised that they would be playing to a 50/50 multi-racial audience. But when this did not occur, the band returned to the UK and wrote to the United Nations expressing their regret at playing the show and their support of the anti-apartheid cause.

The year of 1987 concluded with appearances in the Soviet Union in December, after which Crompton and Pyle stepped aside as the original foursome put out Nouveau Calls, And the original line-up's tour of 1988 was a huge success, as the band played large venues for the first time since the late 1970s. The original Wishbone Ash lineup performed onstage for the first time since February 1974, playing the first concert of their reunion at Folkestone Leas Cliffe Hall in February 1988. Due to a late arrival from Chicago due to immigration problems, Ted Turner had missed tour rehearsals, so Jamie Crompton was brought back to play with the band during the first few weeks of the tour for the first part of the show, with Ted brought on mid-set. In August 1989 the band released a reunion album with vocals entitled Here to Hear, featuring mainly songs written by Ted and Martin Turner.

In 1990 when the band went back into the studio to record the follow-up to Here to Hear, they were shocked when founding member Upton, the band's drummer for their entire career, announced his retirement from the music industry. They enlisted drummer Robbie France, but replaced him with Ray Weston when it was determined that personal conflicts between France and Martin Turner could not be resolved. Strange Affair was released in May 1991, featuring mainly songs written by Andy Powell and Ted Turner.

Later in 1991, the band decided to continue without founding member Martin Turner, with the bassist/vocalist being replaced by returnee Andy Pyle, who had been in the band years earlier. The band toured throughout 1992/93, releasing the live album The Ash Live in Chicago, which had been recorded at two shows at a venue called Easy Street in the Chicago area back in January 1992, with guest keyboardist Dan C. Gillogly. And bassist Brad Lang filled in for Pyle for a BBC date in May 1992 and again that August for a handful of shows. January 1994 saw the second and final departure of Ted Turner. Following Turner's departure, Pyle and Weston also left the band.

=== Reunion years to present (1995–present) ===
At this stage Andy Powell was the only original member left in Wishbone Ash. Powell enlisted guitarist/songwriter Roger Filgate, bassist/vocalist Tony Kishman and drummer Mike Sturgis. The new line-up debuted on a short UK/European tour in spring 1995. But by the time of the band's 25th anniversary tour in the fall of 1995, Tony Kishman was finding touring difficult due to other performing engagements in the United States. Founding member Martin Turner replaced him on bass and vocals for the duration of that tour, plus Festival in Budapest on June 30, 1996 and additional tour dates in October 1996, before Kishman returned to tour and record lead vocals for the band's next album, Illuminations, which was released in November 1996 and featured the Powell/Filgate/Kishman/Sturgis line-up. Powell relied on fan donations and outside assistance to help finance the album.

On 13 November 1997 guitarist Chris Auld filled in for Filgate at a Wishbone Ash show in Bradford, but at that year's end, Filgate, Kishman and Sturgis all departed, so in late 97, Powell brought former drummer Weston back into the fold, along with new members guitarist Mark Birch and bassist Bob Skeat. Wishbone Ash then went on to release two electronic dance albums on UK indie label Invisible Hands Music. The albums contained electronic beats blended with Wishbone Ash guitar riffs. Trance Visionary was the first of the pair, spawning a 12" single of four mixes that reached number 38 on the UK dance chart. Psychic Terrorism followed.

The band then released an acoustic album of classic and new songs entitled Bare Bones before hitting the road in 2000 to celebrate their 30th anniversary. A filmed show was held at Shepherd's Bush Empire in London, where the band welcomed special guests Wisefield and Hamill as well as other friends for a star-studded concert that resulted in Live Dates 3 and a live DVD.

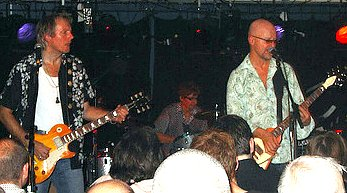
Wishbone Ash performing in Aberdeen, Scotland on 28 October 2006

In 2001 Mark Birch was replaced by Finnish guitarist Ben Granfelt. The band then hit the road for their most extensive touring schedule in years. Wishbone Ash returned to the studio in 2002 for the Bona Fide album and 2003 saw the band touring across the world with Savoy Brown, playing their largest number of American dates since the 1980s.

Ben Granfelt left the band in 2004 to continue working on his solo career and Granfelt's mentor, Muddy Manninen, joined the band. By late 2006, the band released a new studio album entitled Clan Destiny but in 2007, longtime drummer Ray Weston left the band, stating that he was tired of constant touring and wanted to concentrate on different things. He was replaced by Joe Crabtree, known for his work with Pendragon and King Crimson violinist David Cross. In late 2007, the band put out Power of Eternity; their first with new member Joe Crabtree.

On 25 November 2011 Wishbone Ash released their 23rd album, the well received Elegant Stealth, which is also the first album to be recorded by the same line up as the predecessor since 1989.

In 2013 a court case relating to a trade mark infringement and the use of the name 'Martin Turner's Wishbone Ash' was decided. The court ruled in favour of Andy Powell with the comprehensive judgement forming a clear history of the band since its inception.

On 19 February 2014 the 24th studio album Blue Horizon was released. The reviews for this album were generally very positive. As of 2014 this line-up of the band, having been together since 2007, became the longest-lasting line-up of Wishbone Ash in the group's history and on 16 May 2015 they recorded a live to vinyl album at Metropolis Studios.

On 21–23 May 2015 Wishbone Ash recorded the DVD Live in Paris at Le Triton in France. The performance included additional percussion and guitar contributions from Andy's son Aynsley Powell.

In May 2017 it was announced that Mark Abrahams, a long time Wishbone Ash fan, would be joining to cover guitar duties. Abrahams is a guitarist who previously owned Vision Guitars, a guitar shop in Castleford, West Yorkshire, England.

On 24 September 2019 it was announced that Wishbone Ash were signed to Steamhammer/SPV and released Coat of Arms, their first studio album in six years, on 28 February 2020. The album's lead single, "We Stand as One", was premiered on to the band's 50th anniversary in autumn 2019 and had been released on 10 January 2020. The second single "Back in the Day" was released on 7 February 2020. The album cover was created by a heraldry artist Olaf Keller in the Regal Coat of Arms design studio.

For some dates on their 2021 tour, drummer Windsor McGilvray subbed for Joe Crabtree, then Mike Sturgis rejoined the band in place of Crabtree, after which Mike Truscott became Wishbone Ash's official drummer in February 2022.

In August 2023 the band announced the release of a live album, Live Dates Live.

In January 2026 drummer McGilvray replaced Mike Truscott.

== Martin Turner ex Wishbone Ash ==
Martin Turner began touring in 2004 with "Martin Turner's Wishbone Ash", performing material by the classic line ups of the band. Occasionally Ted Turner and Laurie Wisefield have joined his group on stage as guests. He published his autobiography in 2012.

In 2013 Andy Powell took legal action to protect the Wishbone Ash registered trademark and prevent Martin Turner from using his chosen group name. The court ruled in favour of Andy Powell and Martin Turner's application to appeal was refused. Since then he has toured and recorded with his band as "Martin Turner ex Wishbone Ash".

== Special events ==
Wishbone Ash have developed two group gatherings, AshCon in the UK and AshFest in the United States. These began in 1994 and have developed into gatherings of the 'faithful' and have since become annual fixtures.

== Personnel ==
Current members

- Andy Powell – guitar, vocals (1969–present)
- Bob Skeat – bass, backing vocals (1997–present).
- Mark Abrahams – guitar (2017–present)
- Windsor McGilvray – drums, backing vocals (2026–present)

== Discography ==
Studio albums

- Wishbone Ash (1970)
- Pilgrimage (1971)
- Argus (1972)
- Wishbone Four (1973)
- There's the Rub (1974)
- Locked In (1976)
- New England (1976)
- Front Page News (1977)
- No Smoke Without Fire (1978)
- Just Testing (1980)
- Number the Brave (1981)
- Twin Barrels Burning (1982)
- Raw to the Bone (1985)
- Nouveau Calls (1987)
- Here to Hear (1989)
- Strange Affair (1991)
- Illuminations (1996)
- Trance Visionary (1998) (electronic re-recordings)
- Psychic Terrorism (1998) (electronic re-recordings)
- Bare Bones (1999) (acoustic re-recordings)
- Bona Fide (2002)
- Clan Destiny (2006)
- Power of Eternity (2007)
- Elegant Stealth (2011)
- Blue Horizon (2014)
- Coat of Arms (2020)
