= Andy Powell =

English guitarist and singer-songwriter (b. 1950)

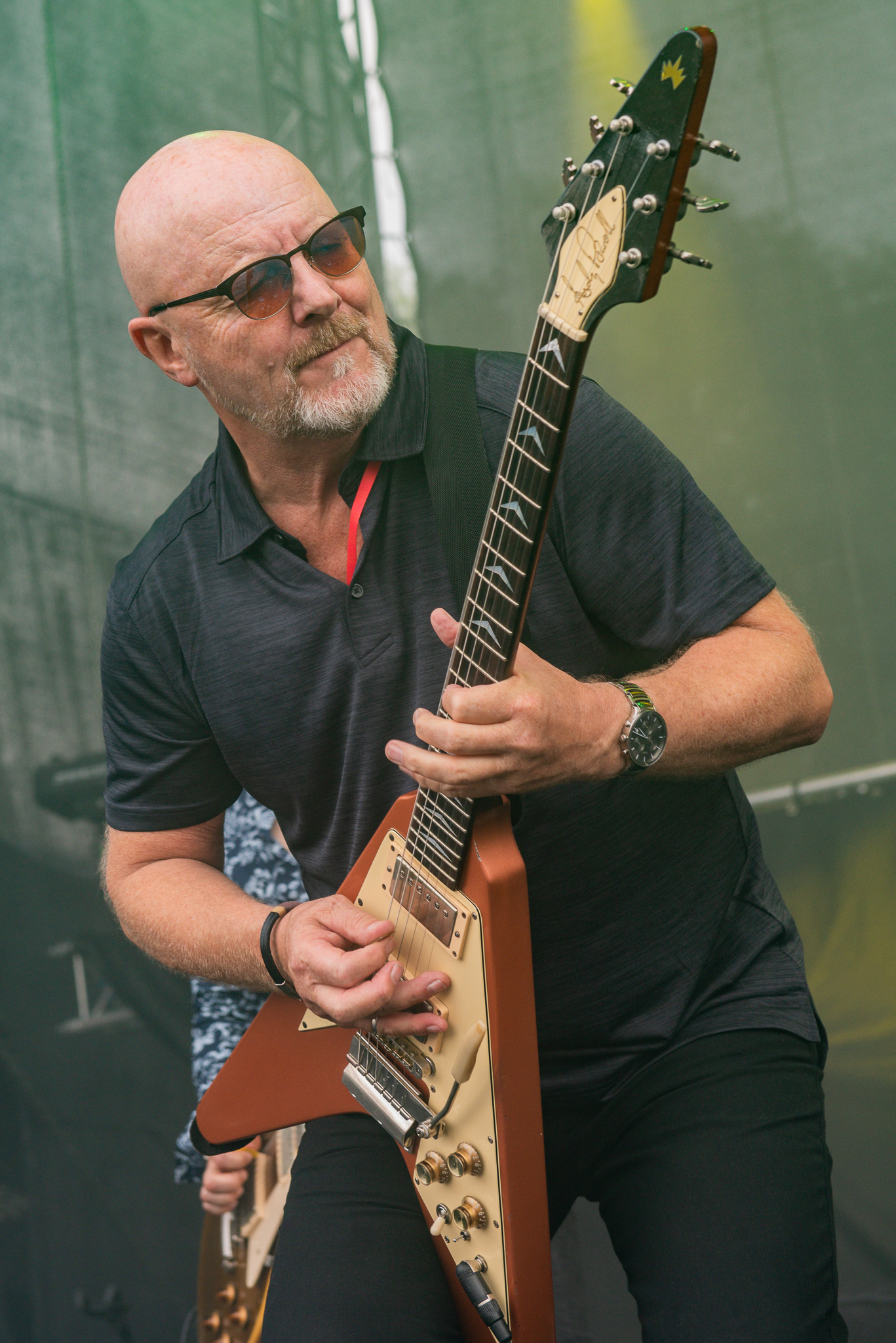
- Powell performing in 2018

Background information
- Born: Andrew Powell; 19 February 1950 (age 76); London, England
- Genres: Rock, hard rock, progressive rock, art rock
- Occupations: Singer–songwriter, musician
- Instruments: Guitar, mandolin, vocals
- Years active: 1963–present
- Labels: MCA, AVM, Neat, IRS, Permanent, Talking Elephant
- Member of: Wishbone Ash

Andrew Powell (born 19 February 1950) is an English guitarist, singer and songwriter. He is a founding member of the British band Wishbone Ash, whose use of twin lead guitars was influential. He was voted in the top 100 greatest guitarists by Rolling Stone magazine. Powell's trademark guitar is a 1967 Gibson Flying V.

== Early life ==
Powell was born in the East End of London and grew up in the new town of Hemel Hempstead, some 25 miles (40 km) north-west of London. He first played guitar at the age of 11, inspired by rock and beat bands such as The Shadows. Starting from age twelve and throughout his teenage years Powell played in many rock/soul groups.

== Career ==
=== Wishbone Ash ===
Powell joined Wishbone Ash in 1969 after answering an advertisement placed in Melody Maker by singer/bassist Martin Turner. The band is known for their twin lead guitar sound made by Powell and Ted Turner. When Powell relocated to the US in the mid-1990s, he relocated the band there. Today Powell is the only original member of Wishbone Ash.

In 2013 he took Martin Turner to court when he began touring in the UK under the name "Martin Turner's Wishbone Ash". Turner had not been a member of Wishbone Ash since the mid 1990s and had resigned ownership of the band name. Powell believed the two Wishbone Ash names were causing confusion in the market and he wanted Turner to change his band name so it was clear Turner was a former member of Wishbone Ash and not fronting a spinoff of the group. Turner claimed that he wanted the registration to be declared invalid. Powell won the court case and Turner changed the name of his band to "Martin Turner Ex-Wishbone Ash".

In 2016 Powell released his autobiography, entitled Eyes Wide Open: True Tales of a Wishbone Ash Warrior.

=== Other appearances ===
Powell guest featured on two albums by the band Renaissance, Ashes are Burning and Turn of the Cards. He has also composed and guest appeared on albums for the American band Utopia, starting with Adventures in Utopia in 1979 and ending with Last of the New Wave Riders in 2003.

== Personal life ==
Powell left England around 1980 as a "tax exile", and since then has mainly lived in Redding, Connecticut, US with his wife Pauline. They have three children. His wife Pauline accompanies the band on tour and oversees their merchandise and their son, Aynsley, helped co-produce the band's 2020 album Coat of Arms.

== Guitar ==
Powell's trademark guitar is a 1967 Gibson Flying V and in 2024 in collaboration with Tatalias Custom Guitars released the limited edition "Andy Powell Signature 67 V Guitar", a red painted guitar made to match the exact model Powell has used throughout his entire career.

== Discography ==
Wishbone Ash

- Wishbone Ash (1970)
- Pilgrimage (1971)
- Argus (1972)
- Wishbone Four (1973)
- There's the Rub (1974)
- Locked In (1976)
- New England (1976)
- Front Page News (1977)
- No Smoke Without Fire (1978)
- Just Testing (1980)
- Number the Brave (1981)
- Twin Barrels Burning (1982)
- Raw to the Bone (1985)
- Nouveau Calls (1987)
- Here to Hear (1989)
- Strange Affair (1991)
- Illuminations (1996)
- Trance Visionary (1998)
- Psychic Terrorism (1998)
- Bare Bones (1999)
- Bona Fide (2002)
- Clan Destiny (2006)
- Power of Eternity (2007)
- Elegant Stealth (2011)
- Blue Horizon (2014)
- Coat of Arms (2020)

Other

- Lonely People — Eddy Arnold — 1972
- Ashes Are Burning — Renaissance — 1973
- Turn of the Cards — Renaissance — 1974
- Adventures in Utopia — Utopia — 1979
- An Evening with Utopia — Utopia — 1983
- Secrets of Flying — Johnny Kemp — 1987
- Helleborine — Shelleyan Orphan — 1987
- Gonna Getcha — Blue Law — 1995
- City In My Head — Utopia — 1999
- Then You Can Tell Me Goodbye — Eddy Arnold — 2000
- Last of the New Wave Riders — Utopia — 2003
- No Second Troy — No Second Troy — 2005
- Handmade — Ben Granfelt Band — 2014
- Ultra Pop — Vance Westlake
