= Storm Thorgerson =

English graphic designer

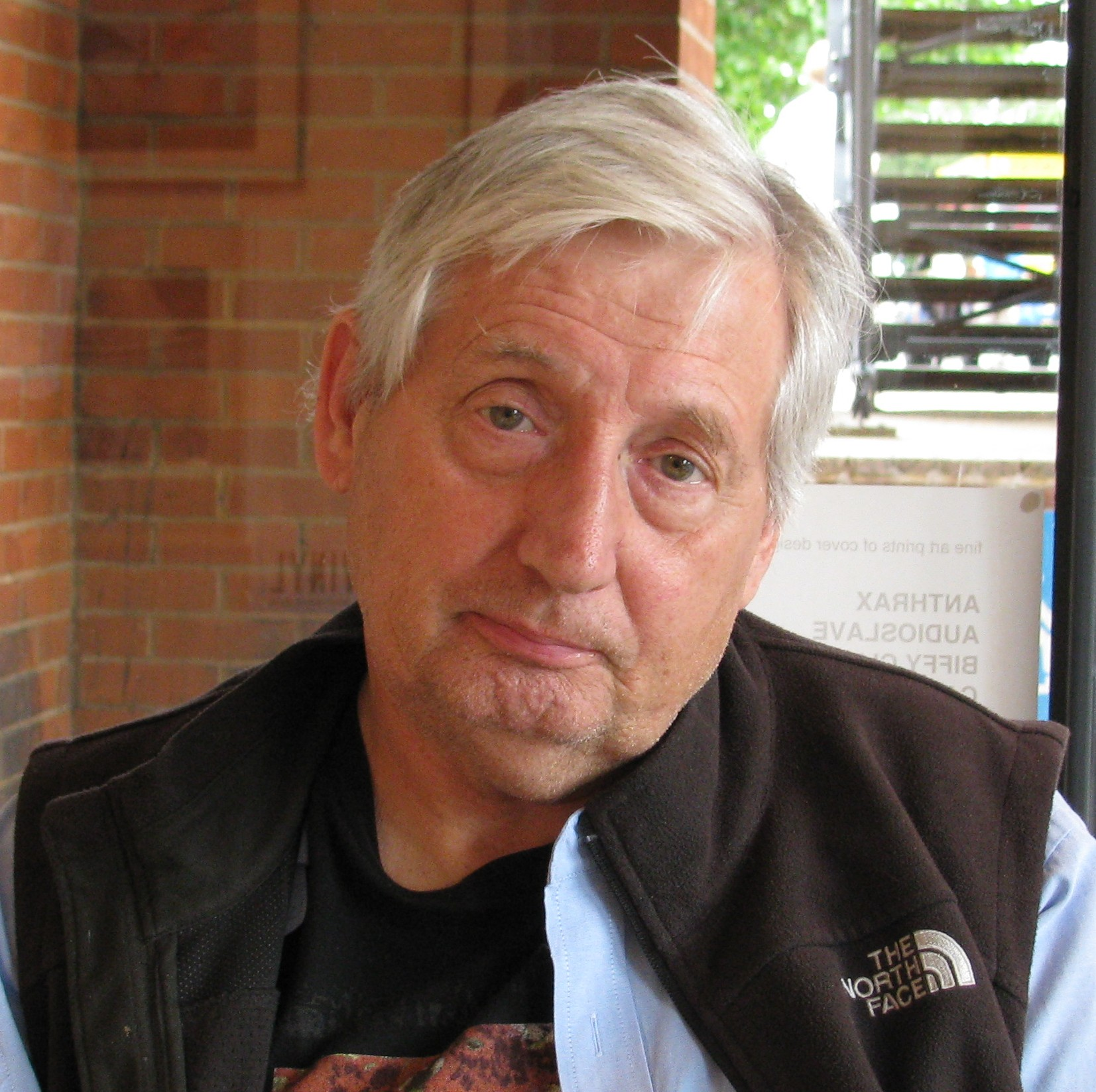
- Thorgerson in 2010
- Born: Storm Elvin Thorgerson; 28 February 1944; Potters Bar, Middlesex, England
- Died: 18 April 2013 (aged 69); London, England
- Years active: 1968−2013
- Known for: Graphic designer; music video director

Storm Elvin Thorgerson (28 February 1944 – 18 April 2013) was an English art director and music video director. He is best known for closely working with the group Pink Floyd through most of their career, and also created album or other art for 10cc, the Alan Parsons Project, Black Sabbath, Catherine Wheel, the Cranberries, Led Zeppelin, the Mars Volta, Muse, and Phish.

== Early life ==
Thorgerson, who was of Norwegian descent, was born in Potters Bar, Middlesex (now part of Hertfordshire). He attended Summerhill School, Brunswick Primary School in Cambridge, and the Cambridgeshire High School for Boys with Pink Floyd founders Syd Barrett, who was in the year below him, and Roger Waters, who was in the year above him. Thorgerson and Waters played rugby together at school, while Thorgerson's mother Vanji and Waters' mother Mary were close friends. He studied English and Philosophy at the University of Leicester, graduating with a Bachelor of Arts degree with Honours, before studying Film and Television at the Royal College of Art, where he graduated with a Master of Arts degree.

He was a teenage friend of Pink Floyd guitarist David Gilmour and best man at Gilmour's wedding to Polly Samson in 1994.

== Career ==
In 1968, along with Aubrey Powell, he founded the graphic art group Hipgnosis, and between them they designed many famous single and album covers, with Peter Christopherson joining them for their later commissions. In 1983, following the dissolution of Hipgnosis, Thorgerson and Powell formed Greenback Films, producing music videos. In the early nineties, Thorgerson inaugurated Storm Studios along with Peter Curzon—a loose group of freelancers. The line up included Rupert Truman (photographer), Finlay Cowan (designer and illustrator), Daniel Abbott (designer and artist), Lee Baker (creative retoucher and designer), and Jerry Sweet (designer) along with Thorgerson's personal assistants, Laura Truman (prints), and Charlotte Barnes.

Perhaps Thorgerson's most famous designs are those for Pink Floyd. His design for The Dark Side of the Moon has been called one of the greatest album covers of all time. Designed by Thorgerson and Hipgnosis, the artwork for the cover itself was drawn by George Hardie, a designer at NTA Studios. Many of Thorgerson's designs are notable for their surreal elements. He often places objects out of their traditional contexts, especially with vast spaces around them, to give them an awkward appearance while highlighting their beauty. To quote Thorgerson, "I like photography because it is a reality medium, unlike drawing which is unreal. I like to mess with reality ... to bend reality. Some of my works beg the question [sic] of is it real or not?"

Over the years, Thorgerson and his team designed and released several books about their work. The first, published in 1989, was titled Classic Album Covers of 60s. The Gathering Storm – A Quartet in Several Parts was the final book Thorgerson worked on with his team and it was completed just before his death in April 2013. The book was released in September 2013 and includes album covers artwork, photographs, and anecdotes, spanning five decades from his early work with Hipgnosis through to StormStudios.

In 2013, Prog Magazine renamed its Grand Design Award after Thorgerson. It is now known as the Storm Thorgerson Grand Design Award and will be given to the designer of the year's best-packaged product. Thorgerson had won the 2012 award for his continued work with Pink Floyd.

== Death and legacy ==
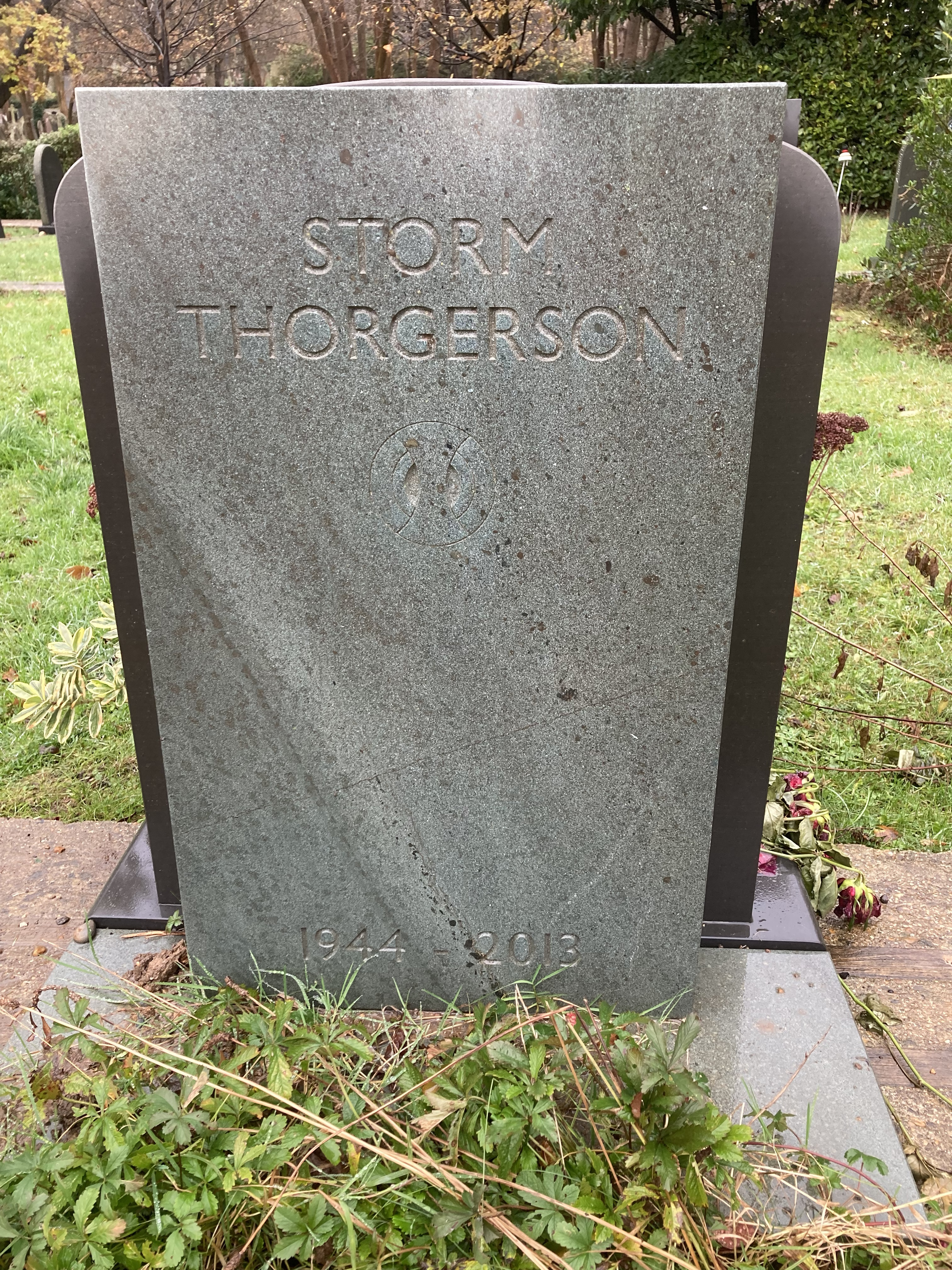
Thorgerson's grave

In 2003, Thorgerson suffered a stroke, from which he was partially paralysed. He was later diagnosed with an undisclosed form of cancer which eventually led to his death in London on 18 April 2013, at the age of 69. He is buried on the eastern side of Highgate Cemetery.

After Thorgerson's death, David Gilmour released a statement describing him as "a constant force in my life, both at work and in private, a shoulder to cry on, and a great friend". A post on the official Pink Floyd website called him a "graphic genius". Pink Floyd drummer Nick Mason said that he was a "tireless worker right up to the end".

In 2015, a film documentary, Taken by Storm, was released on DVD and web streaming. Another documentary, titled Squaring the Circle (The Story of Hipgnosis), focused on the legacy of the Hipgnosis studio, was released in 2022.

== Works ==
=== Album cover designs (1968–2014) ===
- 10cc
  - Sheet Music (1974)
  - The Original Soundtrack (1975)
  - How Dare You! (1976)
  - Deceptive Bends (1977)
  - Bloody Tourists (1978)
  - Greatest Hits 1972–1978 (1979)
  - Look Hear? (1980)
  - Windows in the Jungle (1983)
  - Mirror Mirror (1994)
  - Clever Clogs (2008)
  - Tenology (2012)
- AC/DC
  - Dirty Deeds Done Dirt Cheap (1976) (international edition)
- Airwaves
  - Next Stop (1979)
- Alan Parsons
  - Try Anything Once (1993)
  - On Air (1996)
  - The Time Machine (1999)
  - A Valid Path (2004)
- The Alan Parsons Project
  - Tales of Mystery and Imagination (1976)
  - I Robot (1977)
  - Pyramid (1978)
  - Eve (1979)
  - Eye in the Sky (1982)
  - Ammonia Avenue (1984)
- The Almighty
  - Just Add Life (1996)
- Al Stewart
  - Past, Present and Future (1973)
  - Modern Times (1975)
  - Year of the Cat (1976)
  - The Early Years (1977)
  - Time Passages (1978)
- Amazulu
  - "Mony Mony" (single) (1987)
  - "Wonderful World, Beautiful People" (single) (1987)
- The Amplifetes
  - Where Is the Light (2013)
- Another Animal
  - Another Animal (2007)
- The Answer
  - New Horizon (2013)
- Anthrax
  - Stomp 442 (1995)
- A.P. and the Heath
  - Bleak Future (EP) (2013)
- Argent
  - Ring of Hands (1971)
  - In Deep (1973)
- Ashra
  - Correlations (1979)
- Audience
  - The House on the Hill (1971)
  - Lunch (1972)
  - You Can't Beat 'em (1973)
- Audioslave
  - Audioslave (2002)
- The Aynsley Dunbar Retaliation
  - The Aynsley Dunbar Retaliation (1968)
  - Doctor Dunbar's Prescription (1969)
  - To Mum, From Aynsley & the Boys (1969)
  - Remains to Be Heard (1970)
- Bad Company
  - Bad Company (1974)
  - Straight Shooter (1975)
  - Burnin' Sky (1977)
  - Desolation Angels (1979)
  - Rough Diamonds (1982)
- Barclay James Harvest
  - Welcome to the Show (1990)
- Be-Bop Deluxe
  - Drastic Plastic (1978)
- Biffy Clyro
  - Puzzle (2007)
    - "Saturday Superhouse" (2007)
    - "Living is a Problem Because Everything Dies" (2007)
    - "Folding Stars" (2007)
    - "Machines" (2007)
  - Only Revolutions (2009)
    - "That Golden Rule" (2009)
    - "The Captain" (2009)
    - "Lonely Revolutions" (2010)
  - Opposites (2013)
    - "Black Chandelier" (2013)
    - "Biblical" (2013)
    - "Opposite" (2013)
    - "Victory Over the Sun" (2013)
    - "Similarities" (2014)
- Black Sabbath
  - Technical Ecstasy (1976)
  - Never Say Die! (1978)
- Blinker the Star
  - August Everywhere (1999)
- Blue Mink
  - A Time of Change (1972)
  - Fruity (1974)
- Brand X
  - Unorthodox Behaviour (1976)
  - Moroccan Roll (1977)
  - Livestock (1977)
  - Product (1979)
  - Do They Hurt? (1980)
- Bruce Dickinson
  - Skunkworks (1996)
- Bunk Dogger
  - First Offence (1978)
- Catherine Wheel
  - Chrome (1993)
  - Happy Days (1995)
  - Like Cats and Dogs (compilation) (1996)
  - Adam And Eve (1997)
  - Wishville (2000)
- Caravan
  - Cunning Stunts (1975)
- Cozy Powell
  - Tilt (1981)
- The Cranberries
  - Bury the Hatchet (1999)
  - Beneath the Skin – Live in Paris DVD (2001)
  - Wake Up and Smell the Coffee (2001)
  - Stars: The Best of 1992–2002 (2002)
- The Cult
  - Electric (1987) (credited on the picture sleeve as "Art Direction by Storm Thorgerson")
- Cochise
  - Cochise (1970)
- Danny Wilson
  - Bebop Moptop (1989)
- David Gilmour
  - David Gilmour (1978)
  - About Face (1984)
  - David Gilmour in Concert DVD (2002)
- De Blanc
  - De Blanc (1983)
- Def Leppard
  - High 'n' Dry (1981)
- Deepest Blue
  - Late September (2004)
- Disco Biscuits
  - Planet Anthem (2010)
- Dream Theater
  - Falling into Infinity (1997)
  - "Once in a LIVEtime" (1998)
  - "5 Years in a Livetime" (1998)
- The Dukes
  - The Dukes (1979)
- Edgar Broughton Band
  - Edgar Broughton Band (1971)
  - Inside Out (1972)
  - Oora (1973)
  - A Bunch of 45s (1975)
  - Parlez-Vous English (1979)
- Electric Light Orchestra
  - The Electric Light Orchestra (1971)
  - ELO 2 (1973)
  - On the Third Day (1973)
  - The Light Shines On (1977)
- Ellis, Beggs, & Howard
  - Homelands (1989)
- Ethnix
  - Your Way (2001)
  - 13 (2002)
- Europe
  - Secret Society (2006)
- Fabulous Poodles
  - Mirror Stars (1978)
- Flash
  - Flash (1972)
  - Out of Our Hands (1973)
- Foreigner
  - 4 (Labels only) (1981)
- Fox
  - Blue Hotel (1977)
- Gary Brooker
  - No More Fear of Flying (1979)
- Godley & Creme
  - Freeze Frame (1979)
- The Gods
  - Genesis (1968)
  - To Samuel a Son (1969)
- Genesis
  - The Lamb Lies Down on Broadway (1974)
  - A Trick of the Tail (1976)
  - Wind & Wuthering (1976)
  - ...And Then There Were Three... (1978)
- Gentlemen Without Weapons
  - Transmissions (1988)
- The Greatest Show on Earth
  - Horizons (1970)
  - The Going's Easy (1970)
  - The Greatest Show on Earth (1975)
- Greg Friedman
  - Can't Talk Now (2013)
- Gun
  - Gun Sight (1969)
- goodbyemotel
  - If (2014)
- Goose
  - Synrise (2012)
- Healing Sixes
  - Enormosound (2002)
- Heavy Metal Kids
  - Kitsch (1977)
- Helloween
  - Pink Bubbles Go Ape (1991)
- Herman Rarebell
  - Nip in the Bud (1981)
- Humble Pie
  - Town and Country (1969)
  - Thunderbox (1974)
- Human Sexual Response
  - Fig. 14 (1980)
- Ian Dury and The Blockheads
  - Mr. Love Pants (1998)
- John Wetton
  - Caught in the Crossfire (1980)
- Jon Anderson
  - Olias of Sunhillow (1976)
- Kansas
  - In the Spirit of Things (1988)
- Katia and Marielle Labèque
  - Gladrags (1983)
- Kennedy
  - Kreisler (1998) (Unused artwork)
- Korda Marshall
  - Now We Breathe (2015)
- Led Zeppelin
  - Presence (1976)
  - The Song Remains the Same (1976)
  - In Through the Out Door (1979)
  - Coda (1982)
- Leisure Cruise
  - Leisure Cruise (2014)
- Leo Sayer
  - Living in a Fantasy (1980)
- Life
  - Life After Death (1974)
- London Posse
  - "London Posse" (single) (1987)
- Machineri
  - Machineri (2012)
- The Mars Volta
  - De-Loused in the Comatorium (2003)
    - "Inertiatic ESP" single (2003)
    - "Televators" single (2003)
  - Frances the Mute (2005)
    - "The Widow" single (2005)
  - Amputechture (2006) (original artwork)
- Marvin, Welch & Farrar
  - Marvin, Welch & Farrar (1971)
  - Second Opinion (1971)
- Megadeth
  - Rude Awakening DVD (2002)
- Mick Taylor
  - Mick Taylor (1979)
- Midnight Flyer
  - Midnight Flyer (1981)
- Mike Oldfield
  - Earth Moving (1989)
    - Earth Moving single (1989)
- Mike Rutherford
  - Smallcreep's Day (1980)
- Moodswings
  - Psychedelicatessen (1997)
- The Moody Blues
  - Caught Live + 5 (1977)
- Muse
  - Absolution (2003)
    - "Hysteria" single (2003)
    - "Butterflies and Hurricanes" single (2004)
  - Black Holes and Revelations (2006)
  - "Uprising" single (2009)
- Nazareth
  - Rampant (1974)
  - Hair of the Dog (1975)
  - Close Enough for Rock 'n' Roll (1976)
- Neil Ardley
  - Harmony of the Spheres (1978)
- The Nice
  - Five Bridges (1970)
  - Elegy (1971)
  - Autumn '67 – Spring '68 (1972)
- Nick Mason
  - Fictitious Sports (1981)
- O.A.R.
  - Stories of a Stranger (2005)
- The Offspring
  - Splinter (2003)
- Paul McCartney
  - Tug of War (1982)
- Peter Gabriel
  - Peter Gabriel (1977) ("Car")
  - Peter Gabriel (1978) ("Scratch")
  - Peter Gabriel (1980) ("Melt")
- Pendulum
  - Immersion (2010)
- Phish
  - Slip Stitch and Pass (1997)
- The Pineapple Thief
  - Someone Here Is Missing (2010)
- Pink Floyd
  - A Saucerful of Secrets (1968)
  - More (1969)
  - Ummagumma (1969)
  - Atom Heart Mother (1970)
  - Meddle (1971)
  - Obscured by Clouds (1972)
  - The Dark Side of the Moon (1973)
  - A Nice Pair (1973)
  - Wish You Were Here (1975)
  - Animals (1977)
  - A Collection of Great Dance Songs (1981)
  - A Momentary Lapse of Reason (1987)
  - Delicate Sound of Thunder (1988)
  - Shine On (1992)
  - The Division Bell (1994)
  - P*U*L*S*E (1995), including the blinking LED light that was featured in early CD packaging.
  - Relics re-release (1996)
  - Is There Anybody Out There? The Wall Live 1980–81 (2000)
  - Echoes: The Best of Pink Floyd (2001)
  - Oh, by the Way (2007)
  - The Best of Pink Floyd: A Foot in the Door (2011)
- The Plea
  - The Dreamers Stadium (2012)
- The Police
  - "De Do Do Do, De Da Da Da" (single) (1980)
- Powderfinger
  - Golden Rule (2009)
- Pretty Things
  - Parachute (1970)
  - Freeway Madness (1972)
  - Silk Torpedo (1974)
  - Savage Eye (1976)
  - Cross Talk (1980)
- Program the Dead
  - Program The Dead (2005)
- Quatermass
  - Quatermass (1970)
- Queen
  - Greatest Hits (1981) (Unused artwork)
  - "Las Palabras de Amor (The Words of Love)" (single) (1982)
- Rainbow
  - Difficult to Cure (1981)
  - Straight Between the Eyes (1982)
  - Bent Out of Shape (1983)
- Ragga and the Jack Magic Orchestra
  - Ragga and the Jack Magic Orchestra (1997)
- Ralph McTell
  - Slide Away the Screen (1979)
- Red Hot Chili Peppers
  - Stadium Arcadium (2006) (unused)
- Renaissance
  - Prologue (1972)
  - Ashes Are Burning (1973)
  - Turn of the Cards (1974)
  - Scheherazade and Other Stories (1975)
  - A Song for All Seasons (1978)
- Rick Wakeman
  - 1984 (1981)
- Rick Wright
  - Wet Dream (1978)
  - Broken China (1996)
- Rival Sons
  - Pressure & Time (2011)
- Robert Plant
  - The Principle of Moments (1983)
  - "Big Log" (single) (1983)
- Roger Chapman
  - "The Drum" (single) (1987)
- Roger Taylor
  - Fun in Space (1981)
- Roy Harper
  - Lifemask (1973)
  - Valentine (1974)
  - Flashes from the Archives of Oblivion (1974)
  - HQ (1975)
  - Bullinamingvase (1977)
- Sammy Hagar
  - Sammy Hagar (1977)
  - Musical Chairs (1977)
- Saxon
  - Destiny (1988)
- Scorpions
  - Lovedrive (1979)
  - Animal Magnetism (1980)
  - Blackout (1982) (Unused artwork)
- The Shadows
  - Rockin' with Curly Leads (1973)
  - Specs Appeal (1975)
- Shpongle
  - Ineffable Mysteries from Shpongleland (2009)
  - Live in Concert at the Roundhouse London 2008 (2009)
- Slow Earth
  - Latitude and 023 (2013)
- Steve Hillage
  - Green (1978)
  - Live Herald (1979)
- Steve Miller Band
  - Bingo! (2010)
  - Let Your Hair Down (2011)
- Strawbs
  - Deadlines (1977)
- Styx
  - Pieces of Eight (1978)
  - Cyclorama (2003)
- Syd Barrett
  - The Madcap Laughs (1970)
  - Barrett (1970)
  - Syd Barrett (1974)
  - An Introduction to Syd Barrett (2010)
- Toe Fat
  - Toe Fat (1970)
  - Toe Fat 2 (1971)
- Tony Carey
  - Some Tough City (1984)
- Thornley
  - Come Again (2004)
  - Tiny Pictures (2009)
- Throbbing Gristle
  - 20 Jazz Funk Greats (1979)
  - Heathen Earth (1980)
- Thunder
  - Laughing on Judgement Day (1992)
  - Behind Closed Doors (1995)
- T. Rex
  - Electric Warrior (1971)
- Twink
  - Think Pink (1970)
- UFO
  - Phenomenon (1974)
  - Force It (1975)
  - No Heavy Petting (1976)
  - Lights Out (1977)
  - Obsession (1978)
  - Strangers in the Night (1979)
  - No Place to Run (1980)
  - The Wild, the Willing and the Innocent (1981)
  - Making Contact (1983)
  - Headstone: The Best Of UFO (1983)
- UK
  - Danger Money (1979)
- Umphrey's McGee
  - Safety in Numbers (2006)
  - The Bottom Half (2007)
- Uno
  - Uno (1974)
- Villainy
  - Mode. Set. Clear. (2012)
- Voyager
  - Halfway Hotel (1979)
  - Act of Love (1980)
- Wax
  - American English (1987)
  - A Hundred Thousand in Fresh Notes (1989)
- Ween
  - The Mollusk (1997)
- Wishbone Ash
  - Pilgrimage (1971)
  - Argus (1972)
  - Wishbone Four (1973)
  - Live Dates (1973)
  - There's the Rub (1974)
  - New England (1976)
  - Classic Ash (1977)
  - Front Page News (1977)
  - No Smoke Without Fire (1978)
  - Just Testing (1980)
  - Live Dates 2 (1980)
- Wings
  - Band on the Run (1973)
  - Venus and Mars (1975)
  - Wings at the Speed of Sound (1976)
  - Wings over America (1976)
  - London Town (1978)
  - Wings Greatest (1978)
  - Back to the Egg (1979)
- The Wombats
  - This Modern Glitch (2011)
- XTC
  - Go 2 (1978)
- Yes
  - Going for the One (1977)
  - Tormato (1978)
- Yumi Matsutoya
  - Sakuban Oaisimashō (1981)
  - Voyager (1983)
  - Train Of Thought (VHS film) (1984)
  - "Setsugekka" (single) (2003)
- Younger Brother
  - Last Days of Gravity (2007)
  - Vaccine (2011)
- Yourcodenameis:milo
  - Rapt. Dept. (2005)
  - 17 (2005)
  - Ignoto (2005)

=== Music videos ===
- 10cc – "The Power of Love" (1982)
- Paul Young – "Wherever I Lay My Hat (That's My Home)" (1983)
- Rainbow – "Street of Dreams" (1983)
- Robert Plant – "Big Log" (1983)
- Yes – "Owner of a Lonely Heart" (1983)
- Intaferon - "Get Out of London" (1983)
- Kevin Kitchen – "Tight Spot" (1984)
- David Gilmour – "Blue Light" (1984)
- David Gilmour – "All Lovers Are Deranged" (1984)
- Nik Kershaw – "Wouldn't It Be Good" (1984)
- Nik Kershaw – "The Riddle" (1984)
- Nik Kershaw – "Wide Boy (1984)
- Nik Kershaw – "Don Quixote" (1985)
- Barry Gibb – "Now Voyager" (1985)
- Belouis Some – "Imagination" (1985)
- Belouis Some – "Some People" (1985)
- Glass Tiger – "Thin Red Line" (1985)
- Glass Tiger – "Someday" (1985)
- Ministry – "Over the Shoulder" (1985)
- The Cult – "Love Removal Machine" (1987)
- Pink Floyd – "Learning to Fly" (1987)
- Pink Floyd – "The Dogs of War" (1987)
- Eight Seconds – "Sincere" (1987)
- Wax – "Bridge to Your Heart" (1987)
- Wax – "American English" (1987)
- Wax – "In Some Other World" (1988)
- Anderson Bruford Wakeman Howe – "Brother of Mine" (1989)
- Bruce Dickinson – "Tattooed Millionaire" (1990)
- Bruce Dickinson – "All the Young Dudes" (1990)
- Helloween – "Kids of the Century" (1991)
- Alan Parsons – "Turn It Up" (1993)
- Pink Floyd – "High Hopes" (1994)
- Richard Wright – "Night Of a Thousand Furry Toys" (1996)

=== Books ===
- Thorgerson, S. and Dean, R. (eds), Album Cover Album. A&W Visual Library, New York & Dragon's World, Limpsfield, 1977. ISBN 0891040854, 0905895002, 0905895452, 0905895010. Republished by Harper Design / Collins Design and Ilex Publishing, 2008. ISBN 978-0061626951, 978-1905814404.
- Dean, R. and Howells, D. (compilers) and Thorgerson, S. (ed.), Album Cover Album, Volume 2. A&W Visual Library, New York & Dragon's World, Limpsfield, 1982. ISBN 0891043128, 0905895711.
- Dean, R. and Thorgerson, S. (compilers), Album Cover Album, Volume 5. Dragon's World / Paper Tiger, Limpsfield, 1989. ISBN 1850280770, 0823075168.
- Oliver, V., Thorgerson, S. and Dean, R. (compilers), Album Cover Album, Volume 6. Paper Tiger, Limpsfield, 1992. ISBN 1850282137.
- Thorgerson, S. and Christopherson, P. (eds), "Hands Across The Water" - Wings Tour USA. Photographs by Hipgnosis. Dragon's World, Limpsfield and Reed Books, Los Angeles, 1978. ISBN 090589510X, 0891695001.
- Thorgerson, S., compiled by Hipgnosis and George Hardie. The Work of Hipgnosis - "Walk Away René". Paper Tiger / Dragon's World, Limpsfield, 1978. ISBN 0891041052, 0891041044, 0905895088.
- Thorgerson, S. et al., The Photo Designs of Hipgnosis: The Goodbye Look. Vermilion, London, 1982. ISBN 0091506417.
- Thorgerson, S., Classic Album Covers of the 60s. Paper Tiger, London, 1989. ISBN 185028086X, 0831714786, 1843402505, 0681045507, 1843405490.
- Thorgerson, S. and Powell, A., 100 Best Album Covers - The Stories Behind The Sleeves. Dorling Kindersley, London, 1999. ISBN 0751307831, 0751307068, 078944951X, 1552093913.
- Mind Over Matter: The Images of Pink FLoyd:
  - Thorgerson, S. and Curzon, P., 1st ed., Sanctuary Publishing, London, 1997. ISBN 1860742068, 1860742246.
  - Thorgerson, S. and Curzon, P., 2nd ed., Sanctuary Publishing, London, 2000. ISBN 1860742688.
  - Thorgerson, S. and Curzon, P., 3rd ed., Sanctuary Publishing, London, 2003. ISBN 1860748333.
  - Thorgerson, S. and Curzon, P., 4th ed., Omnibus Press, London, 2007. ISBN 978-1846097638.
  - Thorgerson, S., 5th ed., Omnibus Press, London, 2015. ISBN 978-1783056217.
- Thorgerson, S., Curzon, P. and Crossland, J., Eye Of The Storm: The Album Graphics of Storm Thorgerson. Sanctuary, London, 1999. ISBN 1860742580, 1860742599.
- Thorgerson, S. and Curzon, P., Taken By Storm: The Album Art of Storm Thorgerson: A Retrospective. Omnibus Press, London, 2007. ISBN 978-1846096679.
- Thorgerson, S. and Powell, A., For The Love of Vinyl: The Album Art of Hipgnosis. PictureBox, New York, 2008. ISBN 978-0981562216.
- Curzon, P. and Thorgerson, S., The Raging Storm - The Album Graphics of StormStudios. De Milo and StormStudios, 2011. ISBN 978-0957005402, 978-0957005419.
- Truman, R. and Thorgerson, S., Riding Along in my Automobile: The American Cars of Cuba. De Milo and StormStudios, London, 2012. ISBN 978-0957005426.
- Thorgerson, S., The Gathering Storm - A Quartet in Several Parts: The Album Art of Storm Thorgerson. De Milo and StormStudios, London, 2013. ISBN 978-0957005433, 978-1608876785.
- Powell, A., Hipgnosis Portraits. Thames & Hudson, 2014. ISBN 978-0500517635.
- Powell, A. (foreword by P. Gabriel), Vinyl. Album. Cover. Art - The Complete Hipgnosis Catalogue. Thames & Hudson, 2017. ISBN 978-0500519325.
