= Fresh Wine for the Horses =

Studio album by Rob Dickinson
- Released: 12 September 2005
- Recorded: 2003–04 at Oulton Broad, Suffolk, England; New York City, Los Angeles, USA
- Genre: Alternative rock
- Length: 49:36; 52:41 (reissued edition)
- Label: Sanctuary
- Producers: David Rolfe, Paul Umbach, Greg Collins, Rob Dickinson

Professional ratings
Review scores
Source	Rating
AllMusic	4/5 stars
PopMatters	(6/10)
Stylus Magazine	C+

Fresh Wine for the Horses is the debut studio album by English singer-songwriter Rob Dickinson. Released in 2005, it features tracks that Dickinson wrote while a member of Catherine Wheel but never made it onto official releases, as well as new material written since the band's breakup in 2000. The album received mixed reviews from the media, but was met with enthusiastic approval by longtime fans of the band. The release was supported by a tour of small venues across the United States and Canada, where Dickinson performed intimate acoustic sets comprising both Catherine Wheel and solo material. In 2008, the album was reissued in a two disc edition, accompanied by an EP of acoustic versions of Catherine Wheel tracks titled Nude. There was also a slight changing of the original release tracklisting, with the addition of a previously unreleased song called "The End of the World".

== Track listings ==
=== Original Version ===
1. "My Name Is Love" – 4:08
2. "Oceans" – 4:19
3. "The Night" – 4:17
4. "Mutineer" (Warren Zevon) – 1:02
5. "Intelligent People" – 5:20
6. "Handsome" – 5:16
7. "Bathe Away" – 4:07
8. "The Storm" – 3:38
9. "Bad Beauty" – 5:30
10. "Don't Change" – 5:42
11. "Towering and Flowering" / "Mutineer" (reprise) – 6:17

=== 2008 Reissue ===
1. "My Name Is Love" – 4:01
2. "Oceans" – 4:19
3. "The End of the World" – 5:14
4. "Bathe Away" – 3:31
5. "Intelligent People" – 4:52
6. "The Storm" – 3:36
7. "Handsome" – 4:53
8. "Bad Beauty" – 5:22
9. "Towering & Flowering" – 4:37
10. "The Night" – 4:33
11. "Don't Change" – 5:46
12. "Mutineer" – 1:57

Nude

- Acoustic EP included with 2008 reissue
1. "Black Metallic" – 5:12
2. "Crank (Catherine Wheel song)" – 4:07
3. "Ma Solituda" – 4:39
4. "Show Me Mary" – 3:21
5. "The Nude" – 4:09
6. "I Want to Touch You" – 3:13

== Billie Eilish cover ==
In 2019 Billie Eilish covered "The End of the World" (a song included in the 2008 reissue) for Phil Taggart's Chillest Show on Radio 1 Piano Sessions. NME magazine wrote that «If the actual apocalypse happened to be soundtracked by this tranquil cover of Dickinson by the O’Connell siblings, we’d probably be OK with that.».

== Personnel ==
Musicians

- Rob Dickinson – vocals, guitar, piano, organ, harmonica, drums
- David Rolfe – guitar, piano, bass guitar, drums
- Greg Collins – bass guitar
- Paul Umbach – guitar, bass guitar, drums
- Tim Friese-Greene – bass guitar
- Marty Willson-Piper – guitar
- Brian Futter – guitar, vocals
- David Lavita – guitar
- Lawrence Katz – guitar
- Bruce Witken – upright bass
- Neil Sims – drums, percussion
- Bill Lefler – drums
- Ryan Macmillan – drums
- Bryan Mcleod – drums
- Butch – drums
- Tracy Bonham – violin
- Mike Farrel – trumpet, organ
- Peter Adams – keyboards
- Dick Robinson Spiritual Suite, Lonnie Love, April Hoffman – backing vocals

Production

- Rob Dickinson – producer
- David Rolfe – producer, mixing
- Paul Umbach – producer
- Greg Collins – producer
- Ross Hogarth – mixing
- Jennifer Broussard – photography
