= Brox =

Brox is a surname. It is found in Germany, Norway, Sweden, the United States and England, among other countries.

Notable people with the surname include:

- Brox Sisters, American trio of singing sisters, popular in the 1920s and early 1930s
- Jane Brox (born 1956), American author, specializes in non-fiction works
- John Brox (1910–1995), American farmer and politician, served in the Massachusetts House of Representatives
- Kyla Brox (born Stockport, Greater Manchester, England), blues and soul singer from a musical family
- Ottar Brox (born 1932), Norwegian authority in social science and a politician for the Socialist Left Party
- Richard Brox (born 1964) German best-selling author and literary prize winner
- Victor Brox (1940–2023), blues musician from Manchester, England
