= Adam and Eve (Catherine Wheel album) =

Studio album by Catherine Wheel
- Released: 29 July 1997
- Recorded: 1996–1997
- Studio: AIR and Metropolis, London; Machine Works, Vancouver
- Length: 62:44
- Label: Mercury
- Producer: GGGarth; Bob Ezrin; Rob Dickinson

Catherine Wheel chronology
Like Cats and Dogs (1996)	Adam and Eve (1997)	Wishville (2000)

Singles from Adam and Eve
- 1. "Delicious" Released: 4 November 1997; 2. "Ma Solituda" Released: 16 February 1998; 3. "Broken Nose" Released: 20 April 1998

Adam and Eve is the fourth studio album by English alternative rock band Catherine Wheel. It was released on 29 July 1997 by Mercury Records. This was the band's last album to feature original bassist Dave Hawes, also the last to featured the original line-up.

The album peaked at No. 11 on the Billboard Top Heatseekers and No. 178 on the Billboard 200.

== Background ==
Bassist Dave Hawes said of the album "Adam And Eve is my personal favourite album. I think we were at our musical peak and Rob and Brian were writing amazing tunes. Add in Bob Ezrin as an executive producer and hey, presto! He produced Lou Reed's Berlin album (a top 5 album of mine), and I think he added some of that magic dust to A and E."

The album cover, designed by Hipgnosis artist Storm Thorgerson, features naked people in rows of boxes. The A.V. Club named the cover one of the hardest to look at, while Gigwise named it one of the 50 sexiest album covers.

== Reception ==
Professional ratings
Review scores
Source	Rating
AllMusic	4/5 stars
Pitchfork	4.5/10

Response from music critics was generally positive. The Big Takeover magazine named Adam and Eve its "Album of the Year" for 1997, with Radiohead's OK Computer at No. 2. The same site's James Broscheid said that the album was "the band's watershed moment" and that the album was "absolutely brilliant (and 1997's finest!)".

== Track listing ==
=== Album ===
All songs written by Rob Dickinson and Brian Futter.

1. (Intro) – 1:23
2. "Future Boy" – 5:15
3. "Delicious" – 5:10
4. "Broken Nose" – 5:20
5. "Phantom of the American Mother" – 5:43
6. "Ma Solituda" – 5:12
7. "Satellite" – 5:14
8. "Thunderbird" – 6:39
9. "Here Comes the Fat Controller" – 5:31
10. "Goodbye" – 7:02
11. "For Dreaming" – 7:15
12. (Outro) – 3:00

=== Singles ===
"Delicious" (1997)

Europe CD single

1. "Delicious" – 4:22
2. "Future Boy" – 5:15
3. "Judy Staring at the Sun" (with Tanya Donelly) – 4:01
4. "Heal" – 6:13

UK 10" vinyl single

1. "Delicious" – 4:22
2. "Eat My Dust You Insensitive Fuck" – 8:07
3. "Crank" (Live) – 3:55
4. "Texture" (Live) – 5:23

UK CD single

1. "Delicious" – 4:22
2. "Future Boy" – 5:15
3. "Judy Staring at the Sun" (with Tanya Donelly)" – 4:49
4. "Heal" – 6:13

"Broken Nose" (1997)

1. "Broken Nose" (Single Version) – 4:19
2. "Crank" (Live) – 4:25
3. "Texture" (Live) – 4:49
4. "Black Metallic" (Live) – 11:04

UK CD single

1. "Broken Nose" (Live) – 5:03
2. "Flower to Hide" (Live) – 4:50
3. "Heal" (Live) – 7:09
4. "I Want to Touch You" (Live) – 5:50

UK 7" vinyl single

1. "Broken Nose"
2. "Little Muscle" (Live)

"Ma Solituda" (1998)

UK CD single

1. "Ma Solituda" – 4:22
2. "Delicious" (Single Version) – 4:15
3. "Descending Babe" – 6:26
4. "Paranoia" – 4:49

UK 7" vinyl single

1. "Ma Solituda" – 4:20
2. "Kill Rhythm" (Live) – 5:13

UK CD single 2

1. "Ma Solituda" (Tim Friese-Greene Mix) – 4:58
2. "Delicious" (Live) – 4:32
3. "Willing to Wait" – 5:22
4. "Lucifer" – 4:27

== Personnel ==
Credits per album liner notes.

Catherine Wheel

- Rob Dickinson – vocals, guitar
- Brian Futter – lead guitar, backing vocals
- Dave Hawes – bass guitar
- Neil Sims – drums, percussion

Additional musicians

- Tim Friese-Greene – organ, piano
- Pete Whittaker – organ, piano on "Here Comes the Fat Controller"
- Martin Ditcham – additional percussion
- Audrey Riley – cello, string arrangements
- Dick Robinson – vibraphone, harmonica, glockenspiel, thumb piano, Variophon

Production

- GGGarth – producer
- Bob Ezrin – producer
- Rob Dickinson – producer
- Tim Friese-Greene – production thanks
- Randy Staub – engineer, mixing
- Jon Bailey – assistant engineer at AIR Studios
- Anthony Lycenko – assistant engineer and additional recording at Metropolis Studios, digital editing
- Gary Winger – engineer at Machine Works Studios
- Darren Grahn – mixing assistant engineer, digital editing
- Doug Sax – mastering
- Storm Thorgerson – cover artwork
- Peter Curzon – cover artwork
- Julien Mills – cover artwork
- Sam Brooks – cover artwork
- Tony May – photography
