= Black Metallic =

Single by Catherine Wheel

from the album Ferment
- B-side: "Crawling All Over Me"; "Let Me Down Again"; "Saccharine"
- Released: 11 November 1991
- Genre: Shoegaze; gothic rock; neo-psychedelia
- Length: 7:18
- Label: Fontana
- Songwriters: Rob Dickinson, Brian Futter
- Producer: Catherine Wheel

Catherine Wheel singles chronology
"Painful Thing" (1991)	"Black Metallic" (1991)	"Balloon" (1992)

"Black Metallic" is the debut single by English alternative rock band Catherine Wheel, released on 11 November 1991 by Fontana Records. It was later included on the band's 1992 debut studio album Ferment.

The song "broke, and betrothed Catherine Wheel to the American public", hitting No. 9 on Billboard's Modern Rock Tracks chart and earning "massive attention" due to the band's yearlong American tour and heavy rotation of the song's video on MTV. "Black Metallic" also reached No. 68 on the UK Singles Chart.

== Reception ==
AllMusic critic Amy Hanson said that "Black Metallic" "could probably be counted in the ranks of ballad -- albeit one with a droning guitar and a subsonic wailing that cudgeled the listener over the head, at the same time as caressing them to ecstasy," and noted, "With a deeply textured guitar drone and wallop to lead the way, and backed by a forcefully lazy drum beat, Rob Dickinson's vocals, which he renders quite tender here, play beautifully off the noise behind in an ebb and flow which drains to nothing by the end of the song -- a seven-minute epic".

== Track listing ==
No.	Title	Length
1.	"Black Metallic"	7:16
2.	"Crawling Over Me"	5:39
3.	"Let Me Down Again"	3:17
4.	"Saccharine"	5:49

== Charts ==
Chart	Peak position
UK Singles (Official Charts)	68
US Alternative Airplay (Billboard)	9
