= Like Cats and Dogs =

Compilation album by Catherine Wheel
- Released: 9 September 1996
- Recorded: 1991–1996
- Studios: Britannia Row, Konk, The Lockup, Maison Rouge, Ridge Farm, Rockfield, The Roundhouse, Wessex
- Genres: Alternative rock, shoegaze
- Length: 77:54
- Labels: Mercury, Fontana
- Producers: Catherine Wheel, John Lee

Catherine Wheel chronology
Happy Days (1995)	Like Cats and Dogs (1996)	Adam and Eve (1997)

Professional ratings
Review scores
Source	Rating
AllMusic	4/5 stars
The A.V. Club	unfavourable

Like Cats and Dogs is a compilation album by English alternative rock band Catherine Wheel, released 9 September 1996 by Fontana Records in the UK and Mercury Records in the US. The album includes an alternate version of "Heal" from Happy Days (retitled "Heal 2"), several outtakes and B-sides spanning the band's career, and cover versions of songs originally by Pink Floyd and Rush. The Rush song "Spirit of Radio" had been recorded earlier in the year for a CD entitled "Spirit of the edge Vol. 2" (copyright 1996 Mercury/Polydor Records) which was put out by Toronto radio station CFNY-FM, for which the song had originally been written. The original Vinyl version of the album was released as a double 10" gatefold set with alternate artwork and an extra track "Pleasure" exclusive to this release, following "Wish You Were Here" as track A3. The vinyl version of the album omits the hidden track 13 medley from the CD version.

Bassist Dave Hawes said of the album:

I am very proud of our B-sides and really think Like Cats and Dogs is a great album in itself and not just a collection of B-sides. In my younger days I was an avid record buyer and would often be disappointed when playing the B-side of a phenomenal A-side. A lot of bands would just put a "throwaway" track on; usually a song that wasn’t strong enough for an album and I don't think we ever did that. I seem to remember recording our B-sides separately to doing our albums which I think was a good idea so to keep the focus on whatever album we were recording at the time.

== Track listing ==
All tracks are written by Rob Dickinson and Brian Futter, except "Wish You Were Here" by David Gilmour and Roger Waters, and "The Spirit of Radio" by Geddy Lee, Alex Lifeson and Neil Peart.

No.	Title	Source	Length
1.	"Heal 2"	Outtake from Happy Days (1995)	5:09
2.	"Wish You Were Here" (Pink Floyd cover)	Previously unreleased; an earlier version from a November 1993 XFM Radio session was the b-side to "Show Me Mary"	3:28
3.	"Mouthful of Air"	B-side of "Show Me Mary" 12-inch single (1993)	2:42
4.	"Car"	B-side of "Show Me Mary" CD single part 1 (1993)	6:42
5.	"Girl Stand Still"	B-side of "Show Me Mary" CD single part 1 (1993)	8:08
6.	"Saccharine" (remix)	B-side of "Black Metallic" single (1991)	6:04
7.	"Backwards Guitar" (remix)	B-side of "Judy Starting at the Sun" single (1995)	5:10
8.	"Tongue Twisted" (remix)	B-side of "Crank" CD single part 2 (1993)	5:41
9.	"These Four Walls"	B-side of "Show Me Mary" CD single part 2 (1993)	5:21
10.	"High Heels"	B-side of "Show Me Mary" 12-inch single (1993)	3:35
11.	"Harder Than I Am"	Outtake from Chrome (1993)	4:15
12.	"La La Lala La" (remix)	B-side of "Crank" CD single part 1 (1993)	10:44
13.	"Something Strange" "Angelo Nero" "The Spirit of Radio" (Rush cover)	B-side of "Crank" CD single part 1 (1993); B-side of "Judy Starting at the Sun" single (1995); Previously unreleased	10:55

== Personnel ==
Musicians

- Rob Dickinson – guitar, vocals
- Brian Futter – guitar
- Dave Hawes – bass guitar
- Neil Sims – drums, percussion

Production

- Gil Norton – producer (1, 2, 7, 8, 11, 12)
- Rob Dickinson – producer (1, 2)
- Catherine Wheel – producer (3–5, 9, 10)
- John Lee – producer (3–5, 9, 10), engineer (3–6, 9–11)
- Tim Friese-Greene – producer (6)
- Paul Corkett – engineer (1, 2, 7, 8, 12)
- Clif Norrell – mixing (1–2)
- Bob Ludwig – mastering
- Storm Thorgerson – design
- Finlay Cowan – design
- Peter Curzon – design
- Tim Hale – photography
- Tony May – photography
- Rupert Truman – photography
- Richard Manning – illustrations
- Julien Mills – illustrations
