= Downhearted (disambiguation) =

"Downhearted" is a 1980 song by Australian surf rock band Australian Crawl.

Downhearted may also refer to:

== Music ==
- Downhearted (album), 2002, by Charon

=== Songs ===
- "Downhearted", 1953, by Eddie Fisher
- "Downhearted", 1964, also known as "How Blue Can You Get", by B. B. King
- "Downhearted", 1970, from Remains to Be Heard by Aynsley Dunbar Retaliation
- "Downhearted", 1982, by Solution
- "Downhearted", 2015, from Pink Cloud by Pegboard Nerds
- "Downhearted", 2016, by Molly Burch
- "Downhearted", 2022, by Before the Dawn
