= Ferment (album) =

Studio album by Catherine Wheel
- Released: 9 June 1992
- Recorded: 1991–1992
- Studios: Monnow Valley Studio, Rockfield, Wales
- Genres: Shoegaze; alternative rock; dream pop; neo-psychedelia
- Length: 57:10
- Label: Fontana
- Producers: Tim Friese-Greene; John Lee

Catherine Wheel chronology
| Painful Thing (1991) | Ferment (1992) | Chrome (1993) |

Singles from Ferment
- 1. "Black Metallic" Released: 11 November 1991; 2. "Balloon" Released: 27 January 1992; 3. "I Want to Touch You" Released: 6 April 1992

Ferment is the debut studio album by English alternative rock band Catherine Wheel, released in 1992 by Fontana Records. Produced by Tim Friese-Greene and John Lee, the album combined aspects of shoegazing, alternative rock and neo psychedelia. Ferment is the only album to contain the neo psychedelia element of the band's discography. Their next album, Chrome, produced with famed alternative rock producer Gil Norton, shifted the musical direction of the band. While Ferment was originally not all that successful in the charts, the album continues to be well received by critics and fans, even 30 years after its release.

== Promotion and release ==
Four songs from the album – "Shallow", "I Want to Touch You", "She's My Friend" and "Salt" – had previously appeared on independently released 12" EPs, and were re-recorded for inclusion on the album.

The album's lead single, "Black Metallic", reached No. 9 on the Billboard Modern Rock Tracks chart and its video earned heavy rotation on MTV.

Limited numbers of the UK version came with a three-track live EP, recorded at Bath Moles Club on 6 November 1991.

The album was reissued in March 2010, containing bonus tracks (including the 1992 30th Century Man EP and both sides of the "Balloon" single) and extensive sleeve notes.

== Reception ==
Professional ratings
Review scores
| Source | Rating |
|---|---|
| AllMusic | 4.5/5 stars |
| Select | 4/5 |

PopMatters described Ferment as "the band's most unique record". Trouser Press wrote: "With soaring choruses and producer Tim Friese-Greene's shimmering textures, the entire album—both delicate and demonstrative—sparkles and smolders."

In 2016, Pitchfork ranked the album at No. 23 on its list of "The 50 Best Shoegaze Albums of All Time", with reviewer Ben Cardew commenting that "a good half of the songs on Ferment [...] are enduring shoegaze-disco classics, while 'Black Metallic', in its full seven-minute glory, makes a strong claim to being the genre's 'Stairway to Heaven'." In 2017, Paste ranked the album at No. 6 on its list of "10 Shoegaze Albums for People Who Don't Like Shoegaze". Chris Ott, also of Pitchfork, described Ferment as "the unknowing inheritor of an American shoegaze fanbase that had grown steadily through word of mouth, mixtapes and the tireless efforts of The Cure, who first made dream-pop bankable here."

== Track listing ==
All tracks are written by Rob Dickinson and Brian Futter.

| No. | Title | Length |
|---|---|---|
| 1. | "Texture" | 4:19 |
| 2. | "I Want to Touch You" | 4:40 |
| 3. | "Black Metallic" | 7:18 |
| 4. | "Indigo Is Blue" | 5:31 |
| 5. | "She's My Friend" | 4:16 |
| 6. | "Shallow" | 3:28 |
| 7. | "Ferment" | 5:10 |
| 8. | "Flower to Hide" | 4:43 |
| 9. | "Tumbledown" | 4:08 |
| 10. | "Bill and Ben" | 4:09 |
| 11. | "Salt" | 5:26 |

Bonus track on US edition
| No. | Title | Length |
|---|---|---|
| 12. | "Balloon" | 3:56 |

Bonus 12" with vinyl LP
| No. | Title | Length |
|---|---|---|
| 1. | "Shallow" | 3:27 |
| 2. | "I Want to Touch You" | 5:58 |

Side B
| No. | Title | Length |
|---|---|---|
| 1. | "Salt" | 6:39 |

== Singles ==
- "She's My Friend" 28 January 1991
  - 12" vinyl
    1. "She's My Friend" – 4:29
    2. "Upside Down" – 3:13
    3. "Wish" – 3:10
    4. "Salt" – 3:54
- "Painful Thing" 30 May 1991
  - 12" vinyl, CD
    1. "Shallow" – 3:27
    2. "Spin" – 2:44
    3. "Painful Thing" – 3:59
    4. "I Want to Touch You" – 5:05
- "Black Metallic" 11 November 1991
  - CD, 12" vinyl
    1. "Black Metallic" – 7:16
    2. "Crawling Over Me" – 5:39
    3. "Let Me Down Again" – 3:17
    4. "Saccharine" – 5:49
  - 7" vinyl
    1. "Black Metallic (Edit)" – 4:09
    2. "Let Me Down Again" – 3:17
  - US promo CD
    1. "Black Metallic" – 7:16
    2. "Black Metallic (UK Edit)" – 4:09
    3. "Black Metallic (KROQ Edit)" – 5:30
    4. "Let Me Down Again" – 3:17
- "Balloon" 27 January 1992
  - CD
    1. "Balloon (Edit)" – 3:56
    2. "Intravenous" – 3:31
    3. "Let Me Down Again (Live)" – 3:06
    4. "Painful Thing (Live)" – 6:21
  - 12" vinyl
    1. "Balloon" – 4:14
    2. "Intravenous" – 3:31
    3. "Let Me Down Again (Live)" – 3:06
    4. "Painful Thing (Live)" – 6:21
  - 7" vinyl
    1. "Balloon (Edit)" – 3:56
    2. "Intravenous" – 3:31
- "I Want to Touch You" 6 April 1992
  - CD
    1. "I Want to Touch You (Remix)" – 4:35
    2. "Ursa Major Space Station" – 5:04
    3. "Collideoscopic" – 4:07
    4. "Our Friend Joey" – 1:30
  - 12" vinyl 1
    1. "I Want to Touch You (Remix)" – 4:35
    2. "Dead Girl Friend" – 4:27
    3. "Ursa Major Space Station" – 5:04
    4. "Half Life" – 3:53
  - 12" vinyl 2
    1. "I Want to Touch You (Original Demo)" – 5:04
    2. "Black Metallic (Original Demo)" – 4:04
    3. "Wish (Original Demo)" – 3:09
  - 7" vinyl
    1. "I Want to Touch You (Remix)" – 4:35
    2. "Ursa Major Space Station" – 5:04
- "30 Century Man" 29 December 1992
  - CD, 12" vinyl
    1. "30 Century Man" (Scott Walker cover) – 5:19
    2. "Free of Mind" – 3:33
    3. "That's When I Reach for My Revolver" (Mission of Burma cover) – 4:07
    4. "Don't Want to Know If You Are Lonely" (Hüsker Dü cover) – 3:31

== Personnel ==
Catherine Wheel

- Rob Dickinson – guitar, vocals
- Brian Futter – guitar, vocals
- Dave Hawes – bass
- Neil Sims – drums, percussion

Technical

- Tim Friese-Greene – producer
- John Lee – producer, engineer
- Tim Palmer – mixing
- Alastair Thain – photography

== Charts ==
Chart performance for Ferment
| Chart (1992) | Peak position |
|---|---|
| UK Albums (Official Charts) | 36 |
