= Chrome (Catherine Wheel album) =

Studio album by Catherine Wheel
- Released: 20 July 1993
- Recorded: 1993
- Studio: Britannia Row (Fulham, London)
- Genre: Shoegaze; grunge; alternative rock
- Length: 53:46
- Label: Fontana; Mercury
- Producer: Gil Norton

Catherine Wheel chronology
Ferment (1992)	Chrome (1993)	Happy Days (1995)

Singles from Chrome
- 1. "Crank" Released: 28 June 1993; 2. "Show Me Mary" Released: 27 September 1993; 3. "The Nude" Released: 1994 (promo only)

Chrome is the second studio album by English alternative rock band Catherine Wheel, released on 20 July 1993 by Fontana Records in the United Kingdom and Mercury Records in the United States. It was produced by Gil Norton, who would later go on to produce Catherine Wheel's next album, Happy Days. The lead single, "Crank", reached No. 5 on Billboard's Modern Rock Tracks chart.

While not all that successful commercially, Chrome has been well received by critics and fans alike.

== Background ==
Chrome was intended by the band to be a departure into more hard rock territory when compared to their debut, Ferment. Bassist Dave Hawes explained, "The main thing I remember when going to record Chrome was that we didn't just want to make Ferment 2. And through continually touring between Ferment and going into record Chrome we had evolved into a harder sounding band. It just seemed a natural process and so Chrome turned into a harder sounding album and I think Gil Norton was the perfect producer for us at that point of time. We went in with the songs well-rehearsed and I really enjoyed recording Chrome especially doing it in Britannia Row Studios where Joy Division had recorded Closer (a personal favourite band and album of mine)".

The album cover photo was shot in an indoor swimming pool by Storm Thorgerson of the Hipgnosis design company. In 1999, the cover of this album appeared as the cover of the Hipgnosis/Thorgerson retrospective book Eye of the Storm: The Album Graphics of Storm Thorgerson (Sanctuary Publishing). The CD version was also available in a limited-edition version with a shiny chrome-looking cover with embossed writing on it.

The track "Ursa Major Space Station" was named after a guitar effects pedal, while "Fripp" was named after King Crimson guitarist Robert Fripp.

== Promotion and release ==
Chrome peaked at No. 26 on the Billboard Heatseekers Albums chart. It was supported by the single "Crank", a No. 5 Modern Rock Tracks hit.

Music videos were filmed for singles "Crank", "Show Me Mary" and "The Nude". The video for "Crank" featured the band playing in a hotel elevator and lobby to a motley cast of hotel guests, with several scenes emulating the persecution, death, and resurrection of Jesus; "Show Me Mary" had the band being driven around in a taxi; "The Nude" featured the smearing of wet clay across the body of a nude female art model.

Catherine Wheel embarked on tours with Slowdive, Chapterhouse and INXS, among others, to promote this album.

== Music ==
The album is characterized by its "gentle, blushing form of aggression," and its tracks have been described as "harsh and menacing," as well as "celestial and full of dread." According to Brad Nelson of Pitchfork, "It’s a considerably more focused record [than Ferment], both in songwriting and the visibility of its instrumentation; Norton sharpens what Ferment intentionally blurred, dragging a whirling shoegaze design around cleaner guitar tones and Rob Dickinson’s honeyed vocals. Every chord on Chrome is a crisp, metallic clang trapped in a halo of hazy and seductive noise, a membrane through which the individual notes branch like nerves. [...] Where many shoegaze bands would resign themselves to 2-3 monochromatic notes, Dickinson’s vocal melodies are dynamic, vivid, and exhibit an astral quality; they burn, shimmer, and glow against these songs. It’s as if Chrome were imported from another history of alt-rock, one more textured and romantic."

== Reception ==
Professional ratings
Review scores
Source	Rating
AllMusic	4.5/5 stars
Entertainment Weekly	B+
NME	7/10
Q	3/5 stars

Melody Maker described Chrome as "a tighter, more robust affair" than Ferment and "perhaps the ultimate Catherine Wheel album". NME called it "a triumph".

In Trouser Press, Jack Rabid wrote that the album "combines songwriting prowess with more raging playing, pop tunes gone kablooey and a huge bonfire sound with a faint metal edge." Writing in The Rough Guide to Rock, Anna Robinson was less favourable, describing much of the album's material as "comparatively lightweight" compared to Ferment.

"Crank" was included in PopMatters' 2010 list of the "Top 200 Tracks of the 1990s". In 2016, Chrome was placed 9th in Pitchfork's list of "The 50 Best Shoegaze Albums of All Time". Chris Ott, also of Pitchfork recommends the album for those exploring "the alt-rock and shoegaze landscapes of the 1990s."

== Track listing ==
All tracks are written by Rob Dickinson and Brian Futter.

No.	Title	Length
1.	"Kill Rhythm"	3:51
2.	"I Confess"	3:56
3.	"Crank"	3:45
4.	"Broken Head"	4:43
5.	"Pain"	6:31
6.	"Strange Fruit"	3:06
7.	"Chrome"	3:53
8.	"The Nude"	3:51
9.	"Ursa Major Space Station"	5:09
10.	"Fripp"	7:34
11.	"Half Life"	4:08
12.	"Show Me Mary"	3:19

== Singles ==
- "Crank" (28 June 1993)
  - UK 12" vinyl picture disc
    1. "Crank" – 3:46
    2. "Black Metallic" (Peel Session 1991) – 7:55
    3. "Painful Thing" (Peel Session 1991) – 5:52
  - Netherlands CD single
    1. "Crank" – 3:45
    2. "Come Back Again" – 4:24
  - UK CD single 1
    1. "Crank" – 3:45
    2. "La La Lala La" – 5:26
    3. "Pleasure" – 5:22
    4. "Tongue Twisted" – 4:50
  - UK CD single 2
    1. "Crank" – 3:45
    2. "La La Lala La" – 5:26
    3. "Something Strange" – 1:46
  - UK CD single 3
    1. "Crank" – 3:45
    2. "Pleasure" – 5:22
    3. "Tongue Twisted" – 4:50
  - UK cassette single (same two tracks on each side)
    1. "Crank" – 3:45
    2. "Come Back Again" – 4:24
- "Show Me Mary" (27 September 1993)
  - UK CD single 1
    1. "Show Me Mary" – 3:22
    2. "These Four Walls" – 5:22
    3. "Smother" – 7:09
  - UK CD single 2
    1. "Show Me Mary" – 3:23
    2. "Car" – 6:44
    3. "Girl Stand Still" – 8:09
  - US promo CD single
    1. "Show Me Mary (Scott Litt Remix)" – 3:18
    2. "Wish You Were Here" (Pink Floyd cover) – 2:56
  - UK 12" vinyl single, vinyl promo single and promo CD single
    1. "Show Me Mary" – 3:19
    2. "High Heels" – 3:35
    3. "Mouth Full of Air" – 2:42
  - UK 7" vinyl single
    1. "Show Me Mary" – 3:23
    2. "Flower to Hide (Live)" – 5:03
- "The Nude" (1994)
  - UK promo CD single
    1. "The Nude (Scott Litt Remix)" – 4:05

== Personnel ==
Catherine Wheel

- Rob Dickinson – vocals, guitar
- Brian Futter – guitar, vocals
- Dave Hawes – bass guitar
- Neil Sims – percussion
- Tim Friese-Greene – Hammond organ

Technical

- Gil Norton – production
- John Lee – production, engineering

== Charts ==
Chart (1993)	Peak position
UK Albums (OCC)	58
US Heatseekers Albums (Billboard)	26
