= Wishville =

Studio album by The Catherine Wheel
- Released: 23 May 2000
- Recorded: 1999
- Studios: Helioscentric Studio, Rye, East Sussex, England
- Genre: Alternative rock
- Length: 40:29
- Label: Columbia
- Producer: Tim Friese-Greene

The Catherine Wheel chronology
| Adam and Eve (1997) | Wishville (2000) |

Singles from Wishville
- 1. "Sparks Are Gonna Fly" Released: 2000

Wishville is the fifth and final studio album by English alternative rock band Catherine Wheel, released 23 May 2000 by Columbia Records. It was the band's only album not to feature bassist Dave Hawes, who was fired prior to its recording. Without a permanent bassist, the band focused on guitar-centered hard rock arrangements. The album's only single was "Sparks Are Gonna Fly".

== Release ==
Wishville was also released in a deluxe edition featuring special packaging and a second CD of live recordings, recorded live 11 July 2000 in New York.

== Reception ==
Professional ratings
Aggregate scores
| Source | Rating |
|---|---|
| Metacritic | 54/100 |
Review scores
| Source | Rating |
| AllMusic | 1.5/5 stars |
| Pitchfork | 1.7/10 |
| Dotmusic | 8/10 |
| Wall of Sound | 67/100 |

Wishville was met with "mixed or average" reviews from critics. At Metacritic, which assigns a weighted average rating out of 100 to reviews from mainstream publications, this release received an average score of 83, based on 12 reviews.

A negative review came from AllMusic, which wrote: "You'd be hard pressed to get the Catherine Wheel of 1992 or even 1997 to do more than sneeze at the majority of the album. Most of these songs wouldn't have seen the mixing process at any earlier point in their career. [...] Though the record contains some of the most spartan arrangements the band has composed, much of it seems forced and awkward. The lyrics are no help, containing Rob Dickinson's weakest songwriting." Pitchfork's review was highly negative, describing it as "absolutely terrible, a total abomination".

== Track listing ==
1. "Sparks Are Gonna Fly" – 4:16
2. "Gasoline" – 4:22
3. "Lifeline" – 4:29
4. "What We Want to Believe In" – 4:50
5. "All of That" – 4:40
6. "Idle Life" – 4:26
7. "Mad Dog" – 4:04
8. "Ballad of a Running Man" – 4:50
9. "Crème Caramel" – 4:32

Deluxe edition bonus disc

1. "Lifeline" – 4:56
2. "Crank" – 3:37
3. "Fripp" – 7:22
4. "Ma Solituda" (with Andrew Montgomery of Geneva on Vocals) – 5:45
5. "Heal" – 7:21
6. "Future Boy" – 7:40
7. "Intravenous"/"Little Muscle" – 8:00

=== Singles ===
- "Gasoline"
  - US promo CD single
    1. "Gasoline" – 4:22
- "Sparks Are Gonna Fly"
  - UK promo CD single
    1. "Sparks Are Gonna Fly" (Radio Edit) – 3:44
    2. "Sparks Are Gonna Fly" (Danny Saber Remix) – 4:33
  - US promo CD single with tracks from previous albums
    1. "Sparks Are Gonna Fly" (Album Edit) – 3:47
    2. "Sparks Are Gonna Fly" (Radio Edit) – 3:43
    3. "Delicious" – 4:15
    4. "Judy Staring at the Sun" – 3:57
    5. "Waydown" – 3:14
    6. "Crank" – 3:46
    7. "Black Metallic" – 7:18

== Personnel ==
Musicians

- Rob Dickinson – vocals, guitar, bass
- Brian Futter – guitar, bass, vocals
- Neil Sims – bass, percussion, drums, loops, vocals
- Tim Friese-Greene – organ, piano
- Sara Lee – vocals

Production

- Rob Dickinson – producer
- Jason Corsaro – engineer
- Mike Shipley – mixing
- Storm Thorgerson – cover art
- Peter Curzon – cover art
- Stephen Stickler – photography
- Rupert Truman – photography
