= Correlations (album) =

Studio album by Ashra
- Released: 1979
- Recorded: 1978, Berlin and Frankfurt
- Genre: Electronic, new-age
- Length: 42:16
- Label: Virgin, Ariola, MG. ART (Complete edition)
- Producer: Ashra

Ashra chronology
Blackouts (1978)	Correlations (1979)	Belle Alliance (1980)

Professional ratings
Review scores
Source	Rating
Allmusic	3/5 stars

Correlations is the third studio album by the German electronic music group Ashra, released in 1979. It is the first Ashra album to feature a full band; the first two albums under the name had actually been Manuel Göttsching solo albums.

The album features a cover designed by Storm Thorgerson of Hipgnosis.

In 2008, the album was reissued as a limited 5-CD box set under the title Correlations Complete. This release includes the original album, the previously released 3-CD set The Making Of and the previously unreleased original mix, titled Phantasus.

== Track listing ==
Original album

No.	Title	Length
1.	"Ice Train"	7:40
2.	"Club Cannibal"	5:24
3.	"Oasis"	3:46
4.	"Bamboo Sands"	5:40
5.	"Morgana da Capo"	5:29
6.	"Pas de Trois"	8:58
7.	"Phantasus"	5:11

Correlations Complete edition

Disc two
No.	Title	Length
1.	"Ice Train"	5:51
2.	"Phantasus"	5:52
3.	"Bamboo Sands"	5:40
4.	"Springtime"	3:43
5.	"Club Cannibal"	5:49
6.	"Morgana da Capo"	5:21
7.	"Pas de Trois"	8:45

Disc three
No.	Title	Length
1.	"Paradise Express"	46:11
2.	"After the Flood"	6:44
3.	"Steamer"	15:25

Disc four
No.	Title	Length
1.	"Promotion"	15:20
2.	"Tempus Fungi"	22:10
3.	"Donna Wetter"	26:57
4.	"D'accord"	4:40

Disc five
No.	Title	Length
1.	"A Scottish Flavour"	10:01
2.	"Pas de Trois"	39:15
3.	"No Angel No Cry"	7:30
4.	"Ice Train"	4:20
5.	"The Formula"	12:44

== Personnel ==
- Manuel Göttsching: Guitar, keyboards, synthesizer
- Harald Grosskopf: Drums, percussion, synthesizer
- Lutz Ulbrich: Guitar, keyboards
