= Singer Vehicle Design =

American automotive company

- Industry: Automotive
- Founded: 2009
- Headquarters: Los Angeles, CA, USA
- Key people: Rob Dickinson (founder) Mazen Fawaz (CEO)
- Products: Automobiles
- Website: http://singervehicledesign.com

Singer Vehicle Design is an American company that specializes in restoring and modifying Porsche 911s. It was founded by Rob Dickinson in 2009, who is also known as former frontman and guitarist of the English rock band Catherine Wheel. The company is based in Los Angeles, California.

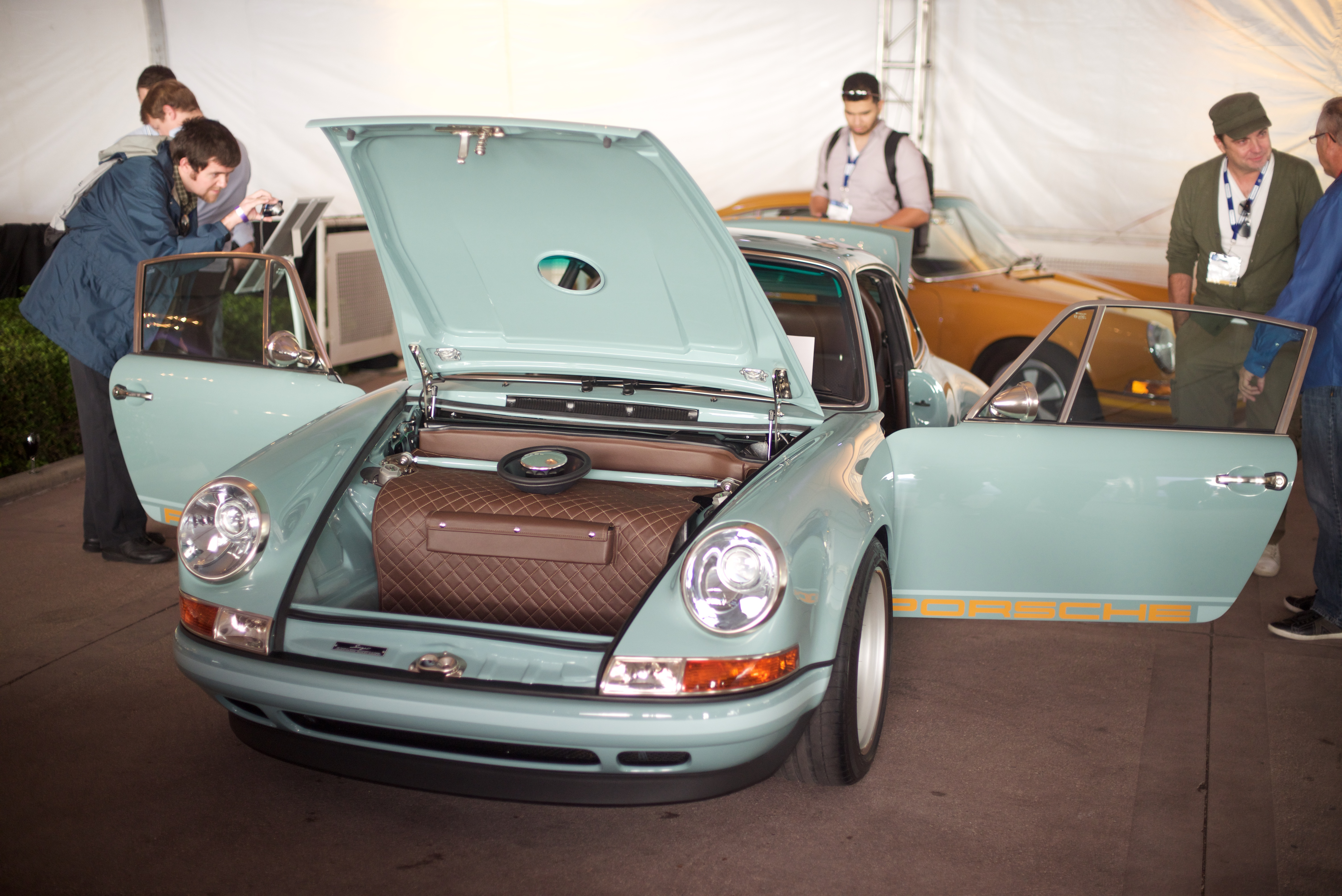
Rob Dickinson (on the right) with a Singer 911

== Name ==
The name "Singer Vehicle Design" pays homage to Porsche engineer Norbert Singer as well as acknowledging Dickinson's previous career as a vocalist.

== Models ==
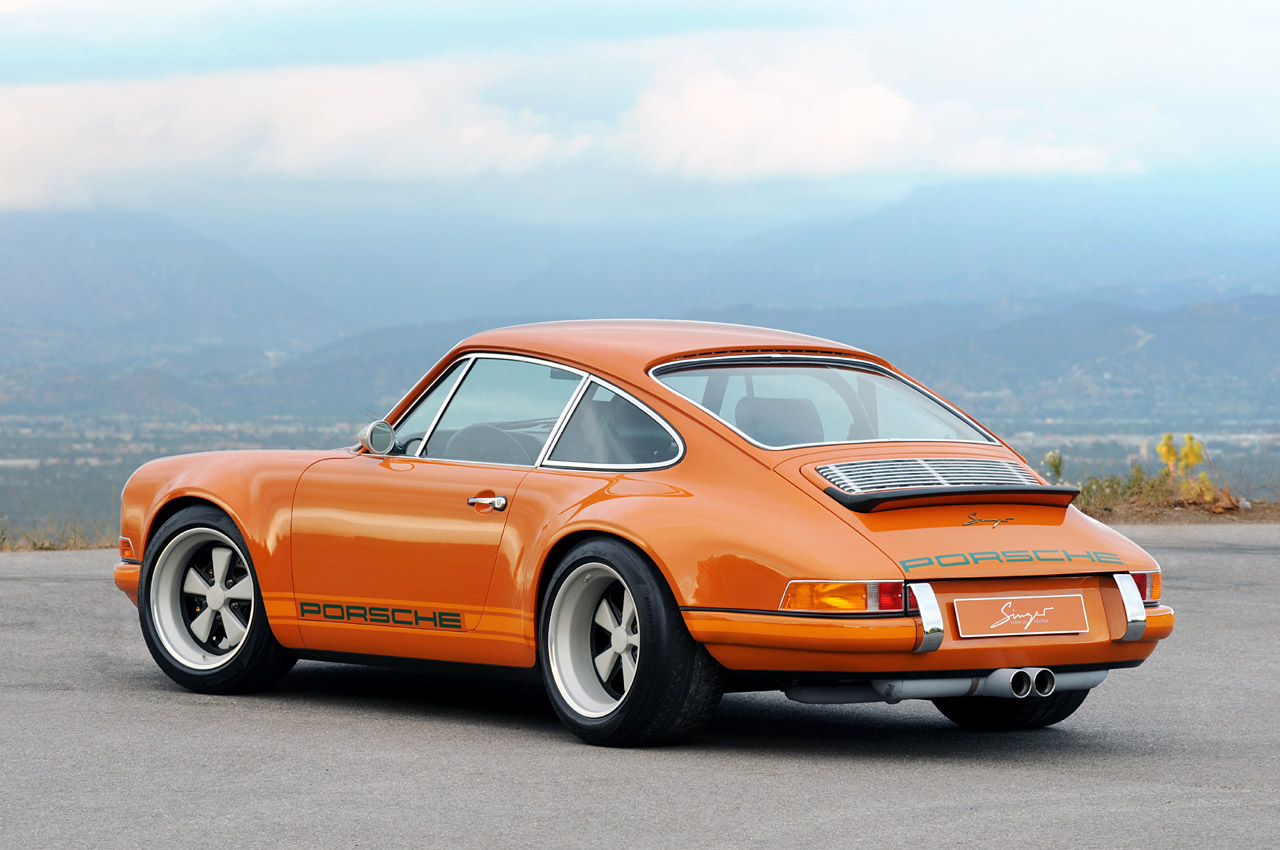
Porsche 911 Reimagined by Singer at the 2009 Pebble Beach Concours d'Elegance

=== Classic Study ===
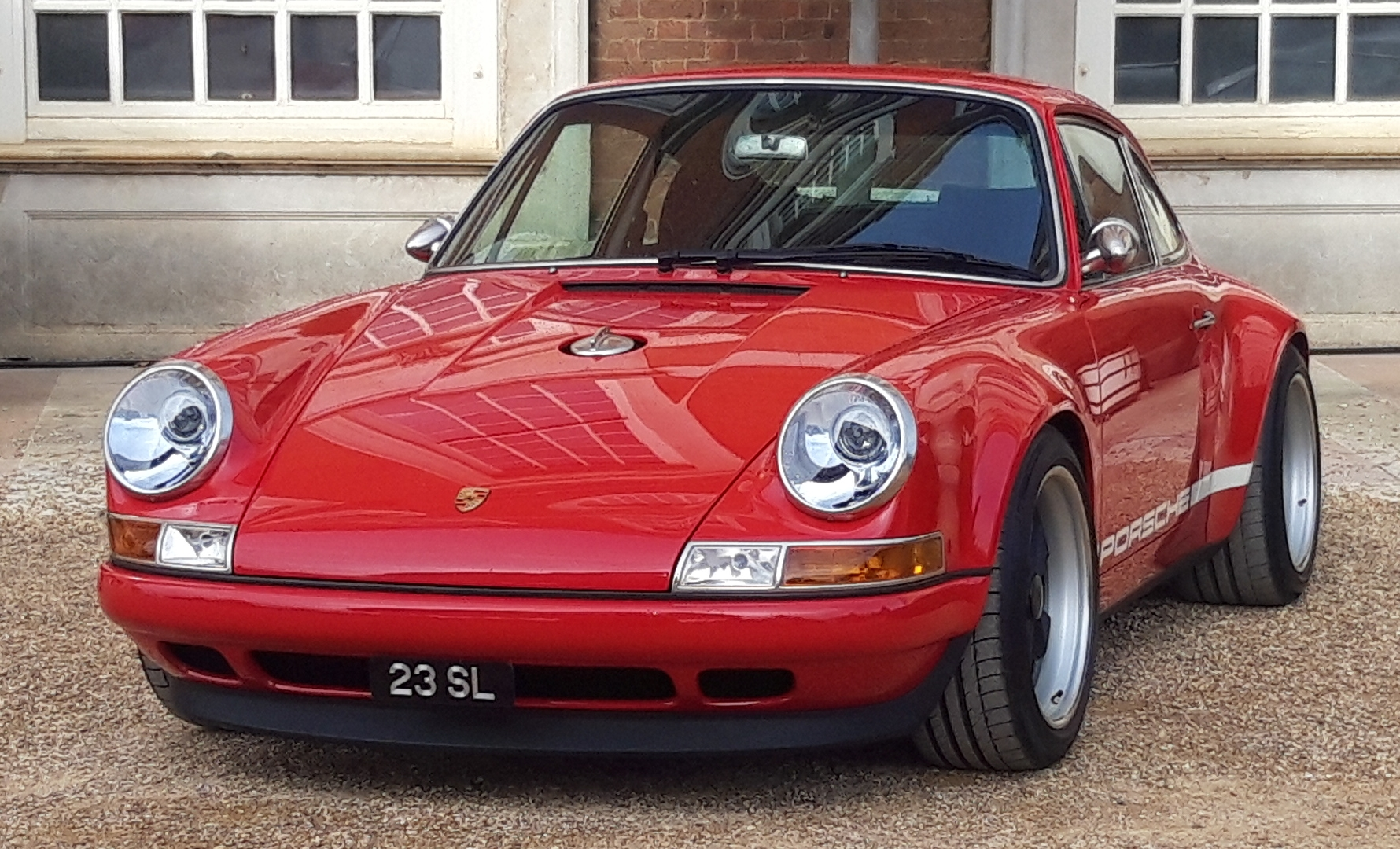
Singer Classic Study

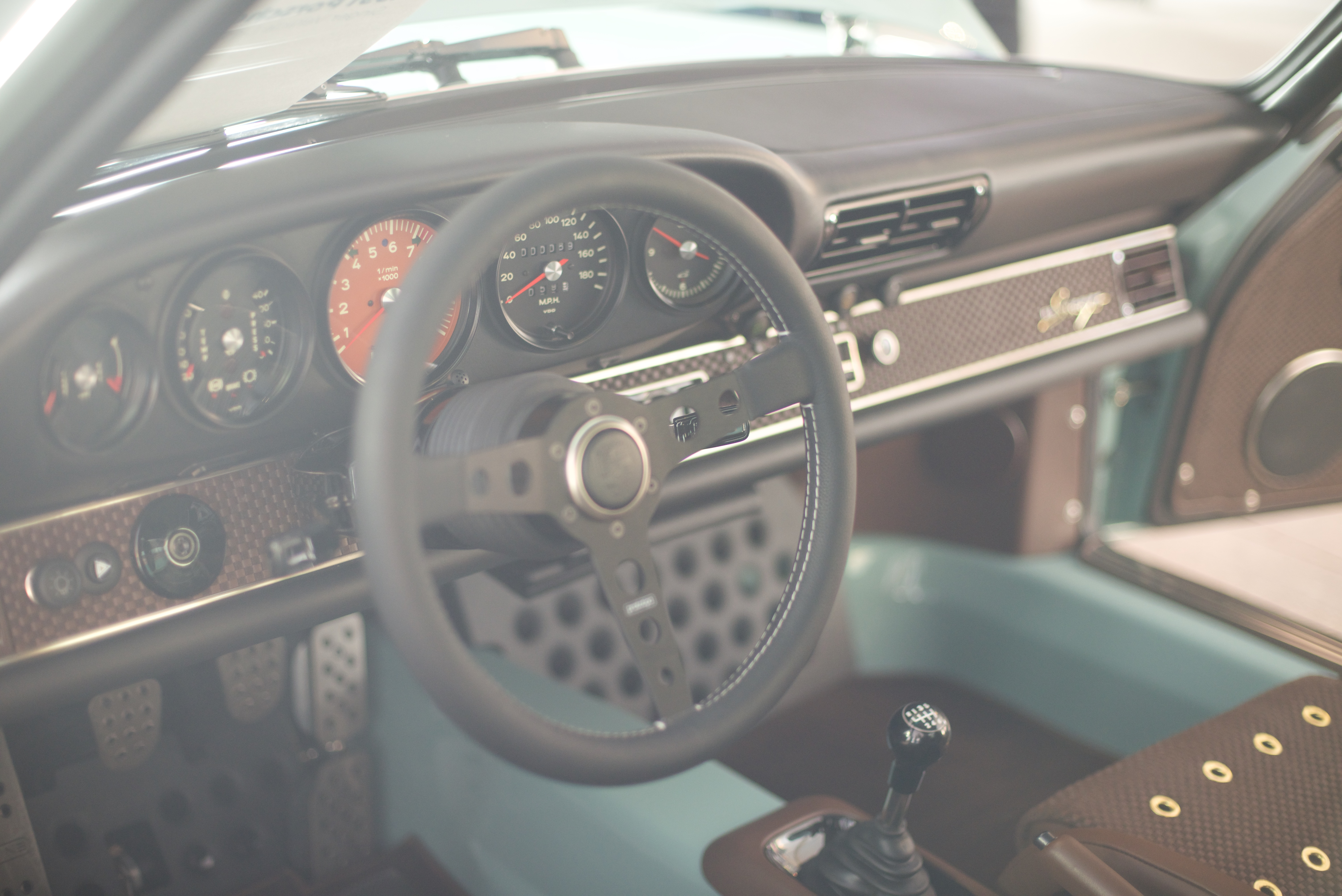
Singer Classic Study Interior

The company's main product is a "re-imagined" 911, which is a heavily modified coupe or targa Porsche 964. Singer's most well-known and sole model for 9 years, was originally simply known as the "Porsche 911 Reimagined by Singer". After the introduction of other models, it began to be referred to as the "Classic Study" model.

Much of the bodywork is replaced with carbon fiber body panels and the engine is reworked by engine manufacturers such as Cosworth, Ed Pink Racing Engines and Williams to produce significantly more power. The long hood of the Porsche 911 classic replaces the shorter hood of the Porsche 964. Relocated fuel filler and oil filler caps are a nod to historic Porsche race cars, and many of the components are bespoke and/or motorsports-grade. The tachometer is often colored in Singer Orange and displays values up to 11, a reference to the up to 11 meme (though engine redline is 7,200 RPM, with 7,300 RPM limiter).

The price of a 911 re-imagined by Singer starts at over $475,000. Examples have sold at auction for well over $1 million.

=== Dynamics & Lightweighting Study ===
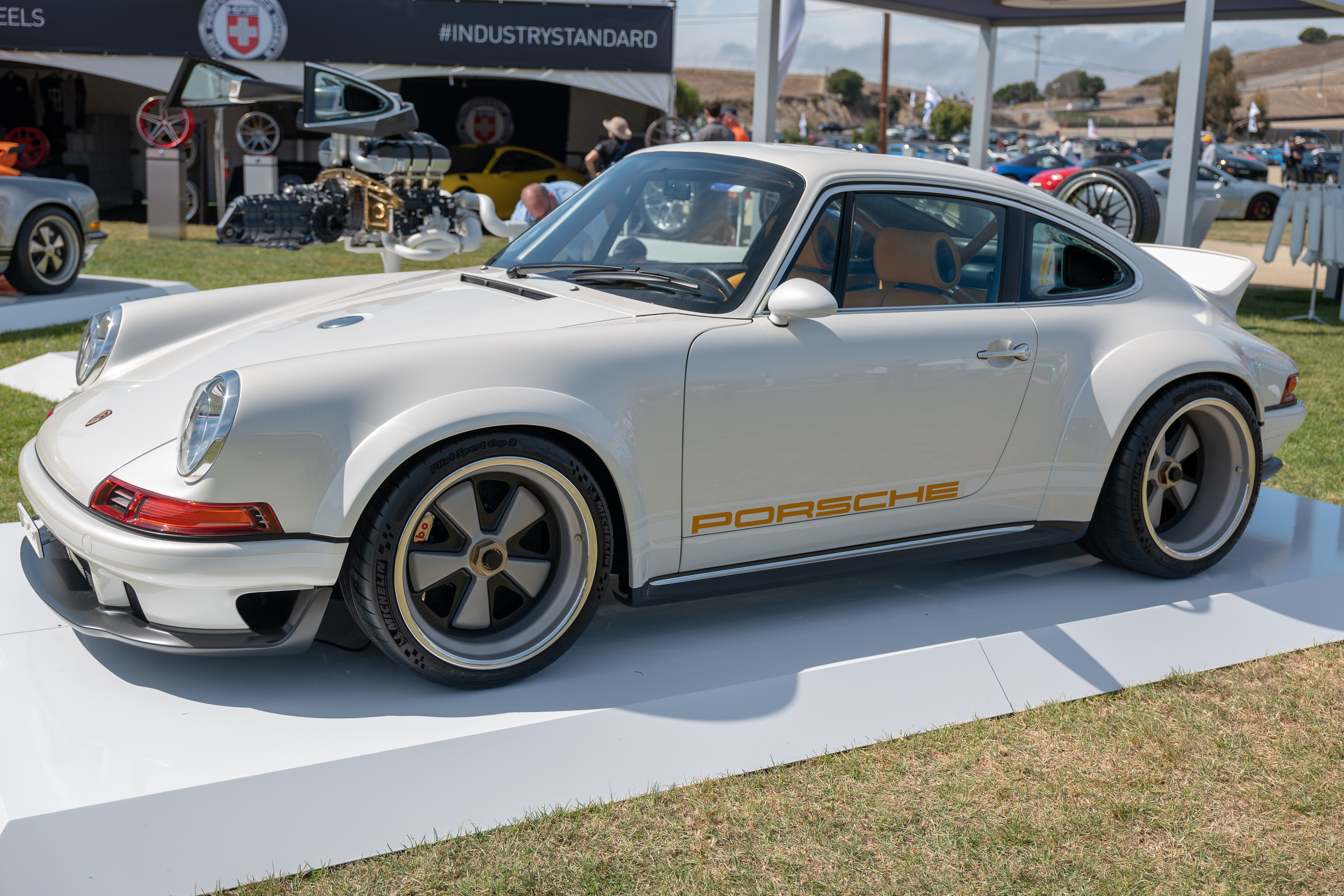
Singer DLS

Introduced in 2018 in partnership with Williams Advanced Engineering, the Dynamics & Lightweighting Study (DLS) features an all carbon fiber body with widened fenders, highly-tuned chassis and suspension engineering, and specially tuned motor built in partnership with Hanz Mezger.

=== All-terrain Competition Study ===
Singer released the All-terrain Competition Study (ACS) in January 2021 in collaboration with Richard Tuthill of Tuthill Porsche, who specializes in rallying and safari-style Porsche 911s. The ACS is a special client request offered in two versions, for both off-road and tarmac rallying. Even as a client commissioned model, Singer announced the readiness to build for other clients as well. The ACS is Singer's first off-road and rally intended model, inspired by Porsches used in rally racing such as the 911 SC/RS, 953, and 959, but with an all-original and heavily modified design by Singer and Tuthill.

Singer ACS

The chassis is heavily reinforced, and features carbon fiber bodywork. The ACS has a twin-turbocharged 3.6-liter flat-six paired to a five-speed sequential race transmission and permanent all-wheel drive system, with three differentials. Singer rates the engine's output at 450 hp and 420 ft-lb of torque, but with tunability for different outputs catered for use in different environments. The suspension features eight total dampers, each five-way adjustable, with long suspension travel and increased ride height. The ACS interior features competition-spec bucket seats and full roll cage, with typical Singer infotainment and comfort equipment.

The Singer ACS is priced at over $1 million.

Porsche AG objected to Singer's usage of Porsche branding on the All-terrain Competition Study in March 2021, as Porsche had no direct involvement in the creation of the heavily-modified car based on their 911. Singer then removed the ACS from its website and social media.

=== Turbo Study ===
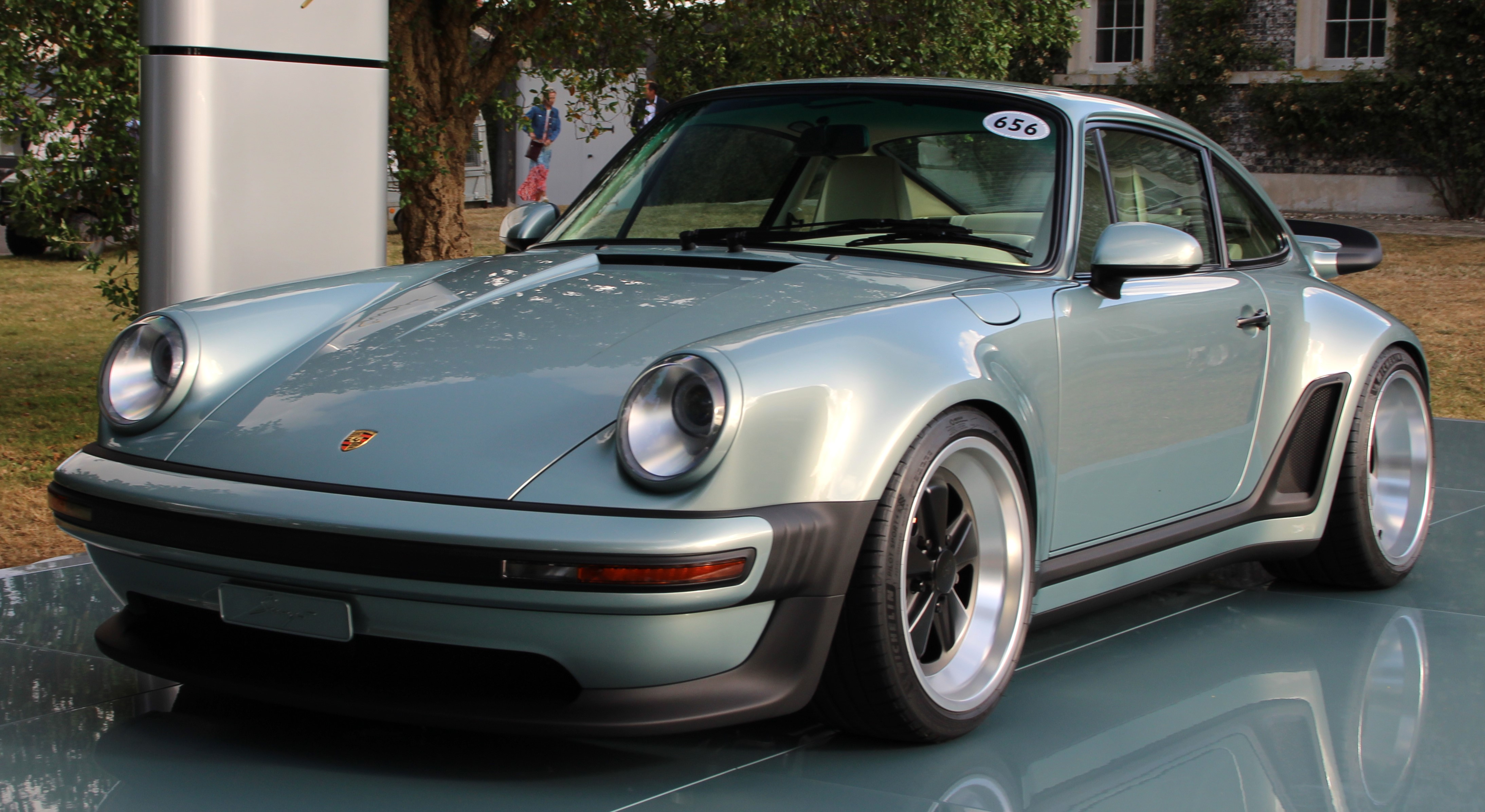
Singer Turbo Study

In June 2022, Singer unveiled the Turbo Study, their first turbocharged model to celebrate the Porsche 930 Turbo based on a 964 chassis. It features a 3.8L twin turbocharged, intercooled flat-six producing either 450 hp in the standard trim or 510 hp in the sports focused trim. Power is sent through a 6-speed manual transmission and rear-wheel-drive drivetrain. The suspension is touring-focused, and it features carbon-ceramic brakes. It also features modern amenities such as electrically adjustable and heated seats. The Turbo Study was later debuted at the 2022 Goodwood Festival of Speed, with first deliveries in 2024. A slant-nose version was made available with a maximum of 25 vehicles to be produced.

=== Dynamics & Lightweighting Study – Turbo ===
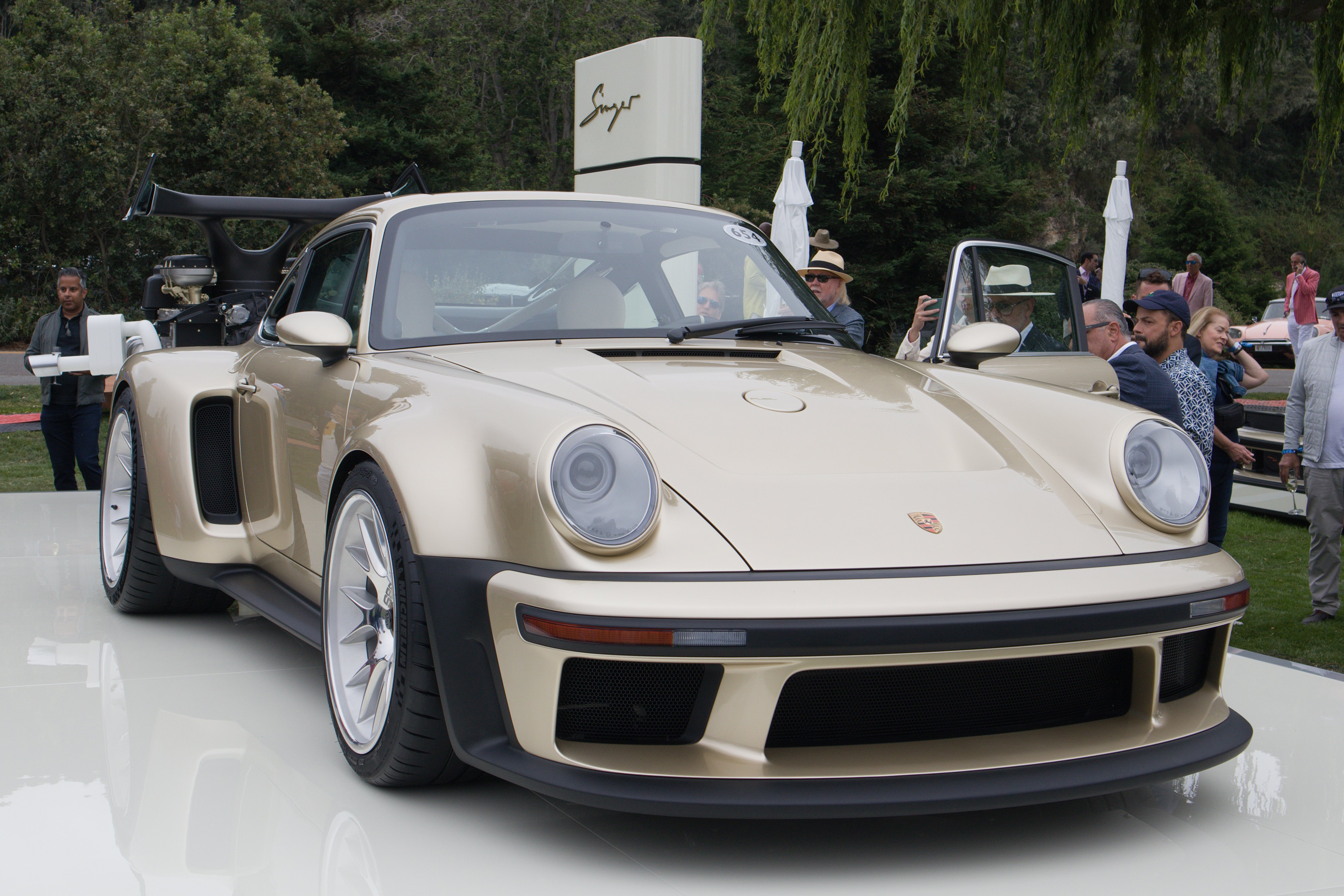
Singer DLS Turbo

In June 2023, Singer presented the turbocharged variant of the DLS, entitled the Dynamics & Lightweighting Study – Turbo (DLS Turbo). It is also based on the 964 chassis, with production limited to 99 vehicles The DLS Turbo features more aggressive and race-inspired body styling, in homage to the Porsche Type 934/5. The DLS Turbo has a 3.8L, 4-valves per cylinder flat-six with twin turbochargers, electric wastegates, air-to-water intercooling and a horizontally mounted, electrically powered fan. This engine produces over 700 HP at more than 9000 rpm.

== Other products ==
Singer has also begun selling wrist watches.
