= Painful Thing =

EP by Catherine Wheel
- Released: May 1991
- Recorded: 1991
- Genre: Alternative rock, shoegazing
- Length: 15:09
- Label: Wilde Club
- Producer: Simon Davey

Catherine Wheel chronology
| She's My Friend (1991) | Painful Thing (1991) | Ferment (1992) |

Professional ratings
Review scores
| Source | Rating |
|---|---|
| AllMusic | 3.5/5 stars |

Painful Thing is an EP by English alternative rock band Catherine Wheel, released in May 1991 on Wilde Club Records. The EP was mixed by Simon Davey at Purple Rain Studios in Norfolk.

The EP was released on CD and 12" vinyl and limited to 2,000 copies of each.

The songs were later rerecorded for the band's debut studio album, Ferment (1992).

== Track listing ==
All songs written by Catherine Wheel.

1. "Shallow" – 3:24
2. "Spin" – 2:42
3. "Painful Thing" – 3:58
4. "I Want to Touch You" – 5:05

== Personnel ==
Catherine Wheel

- Rob Dickinson – vocals, guitar
- Brian Futter – vocals, guitar
- Dave Hawes – bass
- Neil Sims – drums, percussion

Technical personnel

- Simon Davey – mixing
- Alastair Thain – photography
