= Squaring the Circle (The Story of Hipgnosis) =

- Official film poster
- Directed by: Anton Corbijn
- Written by: Trish D Chetty
- Produced by: Trish D Chetty; Ged Doherty; Colin Firth
- Cinematography: Stuart Luck; Martijn Van Broekhuizen
- Edited by: Andrew Hulme
- Release dates: September 2022 (Telluride); July 14, 2023 (United Kingdom)
- Running time: 101 minutes
- Country: United Kingdom
- Language: English

Squaring the Circle (The Story of Hipgnosis) is a 2022 British documentary film, directed by Anton Corbijn, about music album art design studio Hipgnosis.

== Synopsis ==
The documentary follows the history of the Hipgnosis studio, from its beginnings in 1968. The studio was founded by Storm Thorgerson and Aubrey "Po" Powell, who were associates of Pink Floyd and were commissioned to design the cover for the album A Saucerful of Secrets. The film describes the production of several classic album covers by Hipgnosis through the 1970s by artists including Led Zeppelin, Peter Gabriel, Paul McCartney and Wings, 10cc, and others; plus several more covers for Pink Floyd. Several notable musicians are interviewed in the film, discussing the Hipgnosis process of designing their album covers.

The film focuses on Thorgerson and Powell's experimental photography methods and unconventional designs, and the influence they had on rock album covers throughout the era. Powell was interviewed extensively for the film, and also spoke on behalf of Thorgerson who died in 2013. Reviewers noted the influence of director Anton Corbijn's own knowledge of photography and graphic design. The film also includes interviews with modern fans of the classic album covers created by Hipgnosis, including Noel Gallagher. The documentary ends in the late 1970s as punk rock made the elaborate album covers designed by Hipgnosis less fashionable, with Thorgerson and Powell moving into video production and other artistic projects.

== Reception ==
On review aggregator website Rotten Tomatoes, the film holds an approval rating of 92% based on 49 reviews, with an average rating of 7.4/10. The website's consensus reads: "Squaring the Circle remains an informative primer on The Story of Hipgnosis." Metacritic, which uses a weighted average, assigned the film a score of 76 out of 100, based on 18 critics, indicating "generally favorable" reviews.
