= Blackouts (Ashra album) =

Studio album by Manuel Göttsching, Ashra
- Released: 1978
- Recorded: September 1977, Berlin, Germany
- Genre: Berlin School, rock
- Length: 47:01
- Label: Virgin Records
- Producer: Manuel Göttsching

Manuel Göttsching, Ashra chronology
New Age of Earth (1976)	Blackouts (1978)	Correlations (1979)

Professional ratings
Review scores
Source	Rating
Allmusic	4/5 stars

Blackouts is a solo album by German musician Manuel Göttsching, released in 1978. It was originally released as an Ashra album, but the 2012 reissue of the album is credited solely to Göttsching, who wrote and performed it on electric guitar and keyboards.

== Track listing ==
All songs composed by Manuel Göttsching.

No.	Title	Length
1.	"77 Slightly Delayed"	6:46
2.	"Midnight On Mars"	6:51
3.	"Don't Trust The Kids"	3:15
4.	"Blackouts"	4:36
5.	"Shuttle Cock"	8:29
6.	"Lotus Parts 1-4"	16:56

== Personnel ==
Manuel Göttsching – guitars, keyboards, sequencer
