= Crank (Catherine Wheel song) =

Single by Catherine Wheel

from the album Chrome
- Released: 28 June 1993
- Genre: Alternative rock
- Length: 3:45
- Label: Fontana
- Songwriters: Rob Dickinson, Brian Futter
- Producer: Gil Norton

Catherine Wheel singles chronology
"30 Century Man" (1992)	"Crank" (1993)	"Show Me Mary" (1993)

"Crank" is a song by English alternative rock band Catherine Wheel, released 28 June 1993 by Fontana Records. It was the first single from their 1993 album Chrome. The song remains one of the most popular songs from Catherine Wheel.

The song reached No. 66 on the UK Singles Chart and No. 5 in the US on Billboard's Modern Rock Tracks chart.

== Track listing ==
  - UK 12" vinyl picture disc
    1. "Crank" – 3:46
    2. "Black Metallic" (Peel Session 1991) – 7:55
    3. "Painful Thing" (Peel Session 1991) – 5:52
  - Netherlands CD single
    1. "Crank" – 3:45
    2. "Come Back Again" – 4:24
  - UK CD single 1
    1. "Crank" – 3:45
    2. "La La Lala La" – 5:26
    3. "Pleasure" – 5:22
    4. "Tongue Twisted" – 4:50
  - UK CD single 2
    1. "Crank" – 3:45
    2. "La La Lala La" – 5:26
    3. "Something Strange" – 1:46
  - UK CD single 3
    1. "Crank" – 3:45
    2. "Pleasure" – 5:22
    3. "Tongue Twisted" – 4:50
  - UK cassette single (same two tracks on each side)
    1. "Crank" – 3:45
    2. "Come Back Again" – 4:24

== Personnel ==
Catherine Wheel

- Rob Dickinson – vocals, guitar
- Brian Futter – vocals, guitar
- Dave Hawes – bass
- Neil Sims – drums, percussion

== Charts ==
Chart (1993)	Peak position
UK Singles (Official Charts)	66
US Alternative Airplay (Billboard)	5
