= New Age of Earth =

- Cover art of the 1977 Virgin edition

Studio album by Ashra
- Released: 1976 (Isadora); 1977 (Virgin)
- Recorded: March–June 1976
- Genre: Ambient, new-age, electronic, space music
- Length: 47:40
- Label: Isadora, Virgin

Ashra chronology
New Age of Earth (1976)	Blackouts (1978)

Professional ratings
Review scores
Source	Rating
Allmusic	4.5/5 stars

New Age of Earth is a solo album by Manuel Göttsching. While originally released under Göttsching's name and Ash Ra Tempel in 1976, the releases that followed in 1977 and onward were under the name Ashra. It was the first album to be released under the name Ashra. Although a solo album by Manuel Göttsching recorded after the dissolution of his band Ash Ra Tempel, Ashra later evolved into a full band. It was released in 1976 on Isadora Records. New Age of Earth has been listed as one of the Top 25 Most Influential Ambient Albums of All Time. In 2016, Pitchfork ranked it #31 on their list of the 50 Best Ambient Albums of All Time.

== Music ==
Mark Richardson of Pitchfork said: "Backgrounding his guitar work and focusing on synthesizers, Göttsching crafts a new kind of space music, one that feels less about traveling through the cosmos and more about what it might feel like to contemplate existence while meditating on another planet."

== Track listing ==
1. Sunrain – 7:26
2. Ocean of Tenderness – 12:36
3. Deep Distance – 5:46
4. Nightdust – 21:50

== Personnel ==
- Manuel Göttsching - Farfisa Compact, Farfisa Syntorchestra, EMS Synthi A, EKO Computerhythm, Gibson SG Guitar
