= Happy Days (album) =

Studio album by Catherine Wheel
- Released: 6 June 1995
- Recorded: 1994
- Studio: Ridge Farm, Britannia Row, The Green House, Front Row, Nomis, Wessex Sound, The Crypt, The Church, Ft. Apache
- Genre: Hard rock; post-grunge
- Length: 62:13
- Label: Mercury, Fontana
- Producer: Gil Norton, Rob Dickinson

Catherine Wheel chronology
Chrome (1993)	Happy Days (1995)	Like Cats and Dogs (1996)

Singles from Happy Days
- 1. "Judy Staring at the Sun" Released: May 1995; 2. "Waydown" Released: 24 July 1995; 3. "Little Muscle" Released: 1995 (promo only)

Professional ratings
Review scores
Source	Rating
AllMusic	2.5/5 stars
Entertainment Weekly	A

Happy Days is the third studio album by English alternative rock band Catherine Wheel. It was released 6 June 1995 by Fontana Records in the UK and Mercury Records in the US. Like its predecessor, Chrome, it was produced by Gil Norton.

"Judy Staring at the Sun" featured guest vocals by Tanya Donelly. On the single mix, Donelly performed the song's chorus and second verse; on the album, however, her vocals appeared only in the chorus, and all verses were sung by Rob Dickinson. The single peaked at No. 22 on the Billboard Modern Rock Tracks chart; second single "Waydown" peaked at number 15 on the Modern Rock chart and number 24 on the Modern Rock Tracks chart.

The album peaked at No. 5 on the Billboard Top Heatseekers chart, and was also the band's first album to chart on the Billboard 200, peaking at No. 163.

== Track listing ==
All tracks written by Rob Dickinson and Brian Futter.

1. "God Inside My Head" – 3:52
2. "Waydown" – 3:14
3. "Little Muscle" – 3:04
4. "Heal" – 6:13
5. "Empty Head" – 3:12
6. "Receive" – 3:35
7. "My Exhibition" – 2:27
8. "Eat My Dust You Insensitive Fuck" – 8:06
9. "Shocking" – 3:58
10. "Love Tips Up" – 3:55
11. "Judy Staring at the Sun" – 3:56
12. "Hole" – 3:49
13. "Fizzy Love" – 3:34
14. "Glitter" – 4:10 (exclusive to vinyl edition, UK, and Australian CD edition)
15. "Kill My Soul" – 5:10

== Personnel ==
- Rob Dickinson – guitar, lead vocals
- Brian Futter – guitar, vocals
- Dave Hawes – bass
- Neil Sims – drums, percussion
- Tanya Donelly – vocals on "Judy Staring at the Sun"
- Tim Friese-Greene – organ, keyboards
- Audrey Riley – strings, cello
- Mark Feltham – harmonica

Technical

- Rob Dickinson – producer
- Gil Norton – producer
- Paul Corkett – producer, engineer

== Singles ==
- "Judy Staring at the Sun" (1995)
  - Fontana CW CD 8, 852 307-2 (UK CD single)
    1. "Judy Staring at the Sun" – 3:55
    2. "God Inside My Head" – 3:51
    3. "Glitter" – 4:06
    4. "Capacity to Change" – 4:13
  - Fontana CW 8, 852 307-0 (UK 10" vinyl single)
    1. "Judy Staring at the Sun" – 3:55
    2. "God Inside My Head" – 3:51
    3. "Waydown (Live)"
    4. "Crank (Live)"
  - Fontana CW DD 8, 852 309-2 (Australian CD single)
    1. "Judy Staring at the Sun" – 3:55
    2. "God Inside My Head" – 3:51
    3. "Backwards Guitar" – 5:07
    4. "Angelo Nero" – 4:21
  - Fontana CDP 1496, CDP 1496 (UK promo CD single)
    1. "Judy Staring at the Sun" (with Tanya Donelly on vocals) – 3:57
    2. "Judy Staring at the Sun" – 3:57
- "Little Muscle" (1995)
  - Fontana CDP 1525 (UK promo CD single)
    1. "Little Muscle" – 3:04
- "Waydown" (1995)
  - Fontana CW CD 7, 856 933-2 (UK CD single)
    1. "Waydown" – 3:16
    2. "Show Me Mary (XFM Radio Session)" – 3:23
    3. "Kill Rhythm (XFM Radio Session)" – 3:58
  - Fontana CW 7, 856 819-0 (UK 10" vinyl single)
    1. "Waydown" – 3:15
    2. "Crank (XFM Radio Session)" – 3:50
    3. "Wish You Were Here (XFM Radio Session)" (Pink Floyd cover) – 2:48
  - Fontana 852 016-2 (Europe CD single)
    1. "Waydown" – 3:15
    2. "Show Me Mary (XFM Radio Session)" – 3:21
  - Fontana 852 017-2 (Europe CD single)
    1. "Waydown" – 3:15
    2. "Crank (XFM Radio Session)" – 3:49
    3. "Broken Head (XFM Radio Session)" – 5:41
    4. "Chrome (XFM Radio Session)" – 3:54
  - Fontana CW DD 7, 856 819-2 (UK CD single)
    1. "Waydown" – 3:15
    2. "Broken Head (XFM Radio Session)" – 5:41
    3. "Chrome (XFM Radio Session)" – 3:54
  - Fontana CDP 1432, CDP 1432 (US promo CD single)
    1. "Waydown" – 3:14
