= Ashra (band) =

German musical ensemble (founded 1976)

- Also known as: @shra
- Origin: Berlin, Germany
- Genres: Krautrock; electronic music; ambient; kosmische
- Years active: 1976–1998, 2012
- Labels: Isadora; Polydor. Virgin; Ariola; Navigator; Série Poème; Think Progressive; MG.ART; Caroline
- Past members: Manuel Göttsching; Harald Grosskopf; Lutz Ulbrich; Steve Baltes
- Website: Official site

Ashra was a musical ensemble founded by German Manuel Göttsching in 1976, initially to facilitate his solo career although other members were included later on. The band's name is an abbreviation of the name of Göttsching's previous band, Ash Ra Tempel. The name was changed as Göttsching's music became less psychedelic and more oriented towards electronica.

== History ==
Ash Ra Tempel played their last concert in February 1973, their final album Starring Rosi was recorded later that year (featuring future Ashra member Harald Grosskopf). At the demise of Ash Ra Tempel, Göttsching remained musically inactive until 1975 when he released his debut solo album Inventions for Electric Guitar. This album introduced the effects he would later make use of in his work as Ashra, but in a much more basic form. Later that year Göttsching was commissioned to record a film soundtrack. The resulting album was released in 1993 as Le Berceau de Cristal under the Ash Ra Tempel name, despite the fact that none of the other original members of that band feature. Instead, Göttsching was backed by former Agitation Free guitarist Lutz "Lüül" Ulbrich, who would go on to collaborate with Gottsching as Ashra.

The following year Göttsching made his debut as Ashra, releasing New Age of Earth on Isadora Records. This would become perhaps Ashra's most popular album. All instruments are played by Göttsching. A second Göttsching-only Ashra album was released in 1977: Blackouts.

In 1979, the third Ashra album was released. Correlations featured Lutz Ulbrich on guitar and keyboards as well as ex-Wallenstein and Cosmic Couriers drummer Harald Grosskopf who had played drums on Ash Ra Tempel's final album. The band released one further album (Belle Alliance) with this line up.

In 1981, they performed in "Musical Express", a program of the Spanish television network TVE. In this same program they played a jam session together with Neuronium (Michel Huygen, Carlos Guirao, Santi Picó, Miguel Guillamat) and Teddy Bautista.

In the mid-1980s, the trio recorded Tropical Heat, although the album would only be released in 1991. In 1990 the duo of Göttsching and Ulbrich released Walkin' the Desert. The band's next album is 1998's Sauce Hollandaise, a live album released and recorded in the Netherlands, now out of print. For this album the trio of Göttsching, Grosskopf and Ulbrich were joined by Steve Baltes who would also feature in the @shra series, the first of which was also released in 1998. This series embraces a more techno-oriented sound. As of 2011, @shra is the band's last new recording to be released. Göttsching died in December 2022.

== Discography ==
Recording dates are given in italics while release dates are in regular style.

=== Studio albums ===
- 1976/1977 – New Age of Earth (1976) (re-released in 2008 under Göttsching's name)
- 1978 – Blackouts (1977) (re-released in 2008 under Göttsching's name)
- 1979 – Correlations (1978) (Five disc expanded edition (Correlations Complete) including The Making Of album released in 2008)
- 1980 – Belle Alliance (1979) (Two disc expanded edition (Belle Alliance Plus) released in 2008)
- 1990 – Walkin' the Desert (1988)
- 1991 – Tropical Heat (1985-1986)

=== Live albums ===
- 1998 – Sauce Hollandaise (1997) (live album)
- 1998 – @shra (1997) (re-released in 2008 along with @shra Vol. 2 as @shra + @shra Vol. 2)
- 2002 – @shra Vol. 2 (1997) (re-released in 2008 along with @shra as @shra + @shra Vol. 2)

=== Compilations ===
- 1996 – Sunrain: The Virgin Years (1976-1979)
