= Norbert Singer =

German automotive engineer

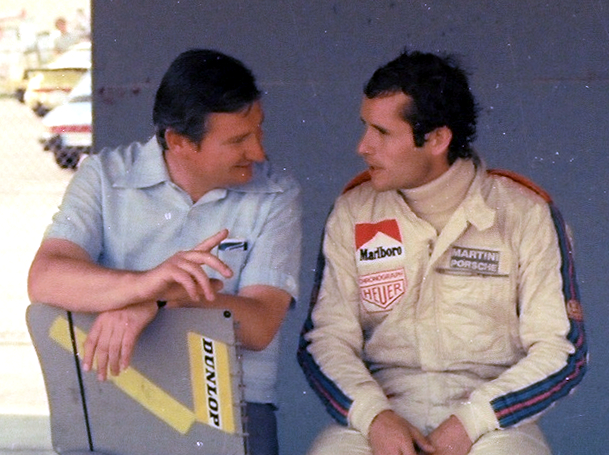
Singer (left) meeting with Jacky Ickx at the Österreichring in 1976

Norbert Singer (born 16 November 1939) is a German automotive engineer. He has played a key role in every one of Porsche’s 16 overall race victories between 1970 and 1998 at the 24 Hours of Le Mans.

Singer was born in Eger (Cheb), which is today part of the Czech Republic, but was part of the German Sudetenland, in 1939.

Singer joined the racing department of the Porsche company in Stuttgart in March 1970. The young engineer from the Technical University of Munich was soon given the job of cooling the gearboxes of the powerful 917 racers which had broken down in 1969. His first task was successful and the Porsche 917 dominated the event in 1970 as well as in 1971, the first year Singer attended the great race.

Singer was involved in the 911 Carrera RSR and RSR Turbo 2.1 from 1972 to 1974 Singer was then given the task of developing the Porsche 911 road car for racing, and in doing so he created eventually what is the most successful customer race car that Porsche produced: the Porsche 935 which won at the 1979 24 Hours of Le Mans outright, notable for a modified 15-year-old road car design.

Following this, Singer designed the bodywork of the Porsche 956 and 962 Group C cars which won 7 24 Hours of Le Mans titles and three Manufacturers’ and two teams’ World Championships between 1982 and 1986 In the 1990s, Singer engineered the Porsche WSC open sports car which claimed two victories in 1996 and 1997.

He oversaw the Porsche 911 GT1 project which finally put the 911's engine into the middle, something that he'd wanted to do since the 935. The 911 GT1 achieved Porsche's 16th victory at Le Mans.

Singer subsequently retired from Porsche's racing department in 2004 and took up a role with the FIA monitoring performance in endurance racing. He continued to support customer teams at races until 2010, and lectures at university about engineering.

Singer was a consultant on the Dynamics and Lightweighting Study, a modified version of the 964 which was produced by Singer Vehicle Design, a company whose name is partly an homage to his work on 911s.

== Bibliography ==
- Wilfried Müller & Norbert Singer (10 December 2020). Norbert Singer – My Racing Life with Porsche 1970–2004. Sportfahrer Verlag. ISBN 978-3945390108.
