= Kyla Brox =

English blues and soul singer

Kyla Brox (born Stockport, Greater Manchester, England) is a blues and soul singer from a musical family.

== Early life ==
Her father was blues singer Victor Brox and her mother is Annette Brox, the 'maid by the fire' in the original Jesus Christ Superstar.

== Career ==
Brox first sang with her father Victor onstage at the Band on the Wall in Manchester in 1992, at the age of 12. She joined his regular touring group the following year. The core of the Kyla Brox Band go back to this unit, nominally the Victor Brox Blues Train, but known informally as 'the child slavery band' because of the extreme youth of the players. As well as Brox, the group contained bassist Danny Blomeley (aged 13), and drummer Phil Considine.

In 2000, she accompanied her father on an extensive tour of Australia. Danny Blomeley had left the Blues Train two years earlier to travel the world, and promised to find Victor some dates in Australia.

Back in Manchester in 2001, Brox and Blomeley formed a duo, occasionally augmented by old members of ‘the child slavery band’, and the line-up finally settled into the Kyla Brox Band - Brox (vocals, flute); Marshall Gill (guitar); Tony Marshall (saxophones); Danny Blomeley (bass) and Phil Considine (drums). The Kyla Brox Band started playing in North West pubs and clubs.

The Kyla Brox Band toured Australia in 2003, 2004 and 2007, the same year they made their US debut.

== Discography ==
=== Solo ===
- 2007 - Gone (Pigskin Records)
- 2009 - Grey Sky Blue (Pigskin Records)
- 2009 - Coming Home (as The Kyla Brox Band, Pigskin Records)
- 2014 - Live... At Last (Pigskin Records)
- 2016 - Throw Away Your Blues (Pigskin Records)
- 2019 - Pain & Glory (Pigskin Records)

=== With Victor Brox ===
- 1998 - Kyla Jane & Victor with the Brox Gang
- 2000 - Darwin Night Train, as Victor Brox Blues Train
- 2001 - Belly Shiver (Bridgetown Blues), credited as Victor and Kyla Brox
- 2009 - Frog in Mah Pocket!, credited to Victor 'Pur & Dur' & Kyla 'Raving Jane' Brox

== Quotes ==
- "Her breathing control is superb but, more than this… Kyla's vocal is natural and very clean… with a depth of feeling…" - Blues Matters
- "An authentic soul diva… sensitive, sexy, and with infinite reserves of sassiness" - City Life
