= Remains to Be Heard =

Remains To Be Heard

Studio album by Aynsley Dunbar Retaliation
- Released: May 1970
- Genre: Blues rock
- Length: 44:30
- Label: Liberty
- Producer: Victor Brox

Aynsley Dunbar Retaliation chronology
Retaliation (1969)	Remains To Be Heard (1970)

Remains To Be Heard is a 1970 album credited to (The) Aynsley Dunbar Retaliation, but with minor participation by Dunbar himself. The group proper had disbanded by then. Former lead vocalist Victor Brox assembled it under management suggestion.

== Track listing ==
- All titles published by Lupus Music.
1. "Invitation To A Lady" (Victor Brox, John Morshead, Victor Dmochowski, Aynsley Dunbar) 4:03
2. "Blood On Your Wheels" (Brox, Morshead, Dmochowski, Dunbar) 5:20
3. "Downhearted" (Brox, Morshead, Dmochowski, Dunbar) 6:12
4. "Whistlin' Blues" (Brox) 2:55
5. "Keep Your Hands Out" (Brox) 4:02
6. "Sleepy Town Sister" (Brox) 4:18
7. "Fortune City" (Brox) 4:04
8. "Put Some Love On You" (Brox) 3:40
9. "Bloody Souvenir" (Brox) 4:28
10. "Toga" (Brox) 5:10

== Personnel ==
The Aynsley Dunbar Retaliation

- Annette Brox - vocals on tracks 4, 6–10
- Victor Brox - vocals, piano, organ, percussion
- John Morshead - rhythm and lead guitar
- Alex Dmochowski - bass
- Aynsley Dunbar - drums, percussion on tracks 1–3, 5
