= Catherine Wheel (band) =

English alternative rock band, 1990–2000

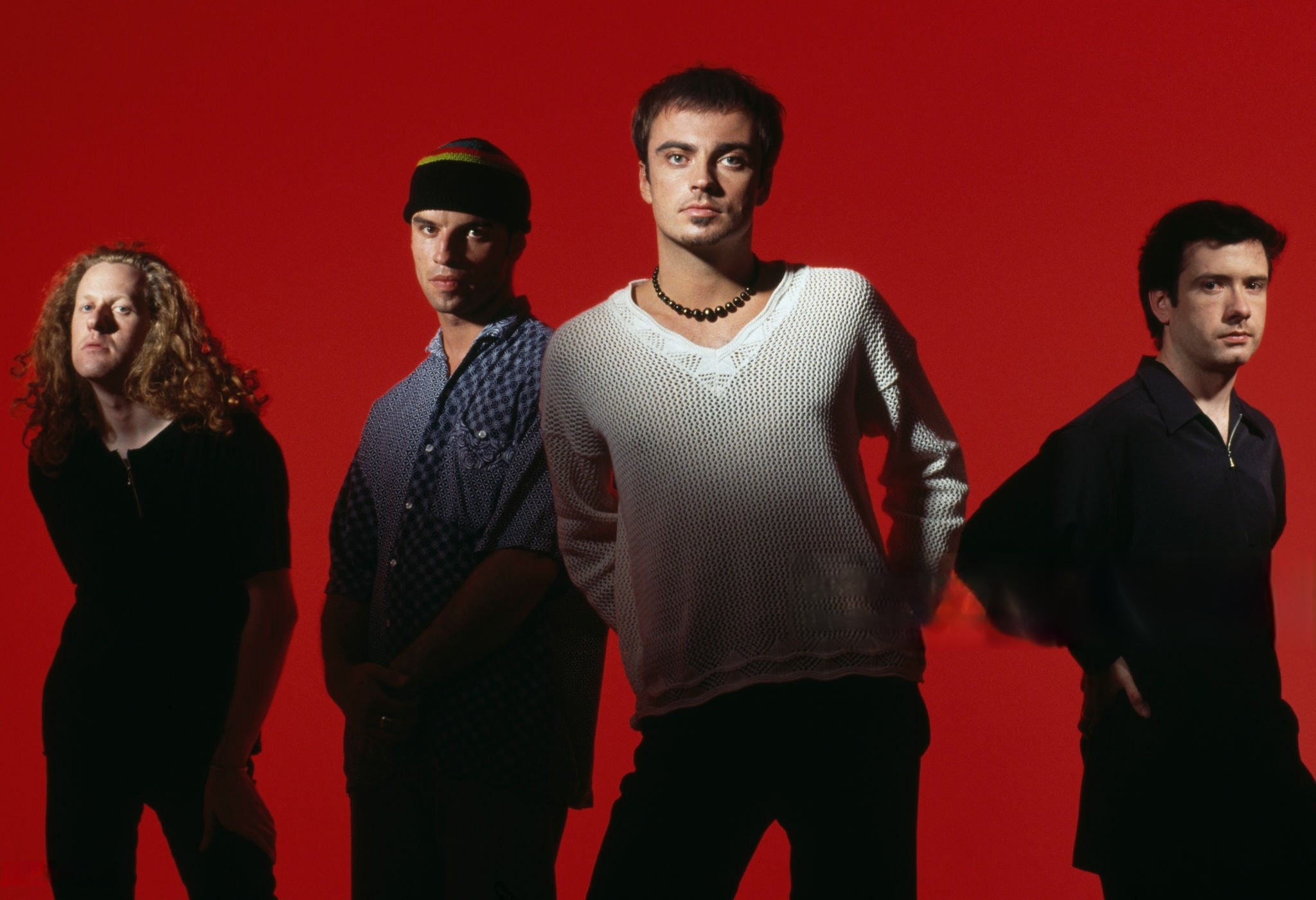
- L-R Brian Futter, Neil Sims, Rob Dickinson and Dave Hawes, 1995

Background information
- Origin: Great Yarmouth, England, United Kingdom
- Genres: Alternative rock; shoegaze
- Years active: 1990–2000
- Labels: Wilde Club; Fontana; Mercury; Columbia; Chrysalis
- Past members: Rob Dickinson; Brian Futter; Dave Hawes; Neil Sims; Ben Ellis

Catherine Wheel were an English alternative rock band from Great Yarmouth and Lowestoft. The band was active from 1990 to 2000, releasing five full-length albums in their career, embarking on many lengthy tours and experiencing fluctuating levels of commercial success. Their early music was associated with the shoegazing scene, but gradually evolved to a more aggressive style influenced by hard rock and metal. Initially receiving attention and success after releasing their debut album Ferment in 1992, the band achieved peak success with the release of "Crank" and their album Chrome in 1993. The band also achieved minor success with other albums, including Happy Days, which featured a popular song "Judy Staring at the Sun" as a collaboration with Tanya Donelly.

== History ==
Catherine Wheel formed in 1990, comprising singer-guitarist Rob Dickinson (cousin of Iron Maiden's Bruce Dickinson), guitarist Brian Futter, bassist Dave Hawes, and drummer Neil Sims. Hawes had previously played in a Joy Division-influenced band called Eternal. They took their moniker from the firework known as the Catherine wheel, which in turn had taken its name from the medieval torture device of the same name. The band was sometimes included in the shoegazing scene, characterized by bands that made extensive use of guitar feedback and droning washes of noise, as well as their continuous interaction with extensive numbers of effects pedals on the stage floor.

The band performed a Peel session in early 1991 while still unsigned; two 12" vinyl EPs were released on the Norwich-based Wilde Club Records, named after the regular weekly Wilde Club gigs run by Barry Newman at Norwich Arts Centre. They signed to major-label Fontana Records after being courted by both Creation Records and the Brian Eno-run label Opal Records. The band's debut album, 1991/92's Ferment, made an immediate impression on the music press and introduced Catherine Wheel's second-biggest US hit, "Black Metallic", as well as the moderate hit "I Want to Touch You". The album features re-recorded versions of some of the Wilde Club-issued EPs. "Black Metallic" was later featured in the film S. Darko.

The more aggressive Chrome followed in 1993, produced by Gil Norton. With this album, the band began to shed its original shoegazing tag, while still making skillful use of atmospherics, such as on the song "Fripp". In a 2007 interview, Rob Dickinson said that members of Death Cab for Cutie and Interpol told him that without this album, their bands "wouldn't exist."

1995's Happy Days saw the band delving further into metallic hard rock, which alienated a portion of their fanbase, even as it increased their exposure in the United States during the post-grunge era. The single "Waydown", and especially its plane-crash themed video, received heavy play in the US. A more sedate strain of rock known as Britpop was taking over in the UK, causing Catherine Wheel to continue to have greater success abroad than at home.

The B-sides and outtakes collection, Like Cats and Dogs, came out the following year, revealing a quieter, more contemplative side of the band, spanning the previous five years. This carried over into Adam and Eve in 1997, wherein the band scaled back the sonic force of their sound from its Happy Days levels, with clean playing on some songs that featured extensive use of keyboards and acoustic guitars. Alternately, songs like "Satellite" and "Here Comes the Fat Controller" were lush and orchestral in scope.

In 2000, Catherine Wheel re-emerged with a new record label, a new bassist (Ben Ellis); a modified name (The Catherine Wheel); and a new album, Wishville. After mixed reviews, record company turmoil and lacklustre sales, the band went on a hiatus. In January 2022, the band began updating a new Instagram account, suggesting that the band had reformed in some capacity. However, Dickinson reported in 2024 that the Instagram account was to promote several EPs being brought to streaming services and that he had not seen his bandmates since the band's 2000 breakup. Dickinson also stated his belief the band would reunite in the future.

In March 2010, Ferment was re-released, containing bonus tracks and extensive sleeve notes.

== Post-Catherine Wheel work ==
Futter and Sims have an ongoing project called 50 ft Monster. Ellis was in a band called Serafin, and went on to play with Iggy Pop. After working with/ playing live with Tracy Bonham for several years, Dickinson released a solo album in 2005 called Fresh Wine for the Horses. Dickinson retired from recording and founded a Porsche restoration company called Singer Vehicle Design in 2009.

== Band members ==
Final line-up

- Rob Dickinson – lead vocals, guitars (1990–2000)
- Brian Futter – guitars, backing vocals (1990–2000)
- Ben Ellis – bass guitar (1999–2000)
- Neil Sims – drums, percussion, backing vocals (1990–2000)

Past members

- Dave Hawes – bass guitar (1990–1999)

== Discography ==
Studio albums

- Ferment (1992) – No. 36 UK
- Chrome (1993) – No. 58 UK
- Happy Days (1995) – No. 163 US, No. 41 CAN
- Adam and Eve (1997) – No. 53 UK, No. 178 US, No. 75 CAN
- Wishville (2000) – No. 30 CAN

EPs

- She's My Friend (1991)
- Painful Thing (1991) – No. 5 UK Indie Chart
- The Norfolk Remasters - She's My Friend (2023)

Compilation albums

- Like Cats and Dogs (1996) – No. 36 Heatseekers (US), No. 45 CAN

Singles

Year	Title	Peak chart positions				Album
Year	Title	UK	Canada Alt	US Alt	US Rock	Album
1991	"Black Metallic"	68	–	9	–	Ferment
1992	"Balloon"	59	–	–	–	Non-album single
1992	"I Want to Touch You"	35	–	20	–	Ferment
1992	"30 Century Man"	47	–	–	–	Non-album single
1993	"Crank"	66	–	5	–	Chrome
1993	"Show Me Mary"	62	–	–	–	Chrome
1995	"Waydown"	67	5	15	24	Happy Days
1995	"Judy Staring at the Sun"	–	10	22	–	Happy Days
1996	"Heal 2"	–	18	–	–	Like Cats and Dogs
1997	"Delicious"	53	12	–	–	Adam and Eve
1998	"Ma Solituda"	53	–	–	–	Adam and Eve
1998	"Broken Nose"	48	–	–	–	Adam and Eve
2000	"Sparks Are Gonna Fly"	–	–	37	–	Wishville

Catherine Wheel music videos
Year	Song	Director	Notes
1992	"Black Metallic"	Barry Magurie	7" version
1992	"I Want to Touch You"	Miles Aldridge	Tim Palmer remix
1993	"Crank"	Geoff Everson	2 versions: towards the end of the original version Rob is spinning on a spiked wheel while the censored version cuts away to shots of Brian and Dave
1993	"Show Me Mary"	Melodie McDaniel	Scott Litt remix
1994	"The Nude"	Elizabeth Baily	Scott Litt remix
1995	"Waydown"	Mark Pellington	
1995	"Eat My Dust You Insensitive Fuck"	Stephen Dorff	LP version; starring Summer Phoenix
1995	"Judy Staring at the Sun"	Nick Egan	featuring Tanya Donelly; MTV edited the words "smacked" and "vein"
1997	"Delicious"	Mark Adcock	
1998	"Ma Solituda"	Karen Lamond	
2000	"Sparks Are Gonna Fly"	Dean Karr	
