= Victor Brox =

English blues musician (1941–2023)

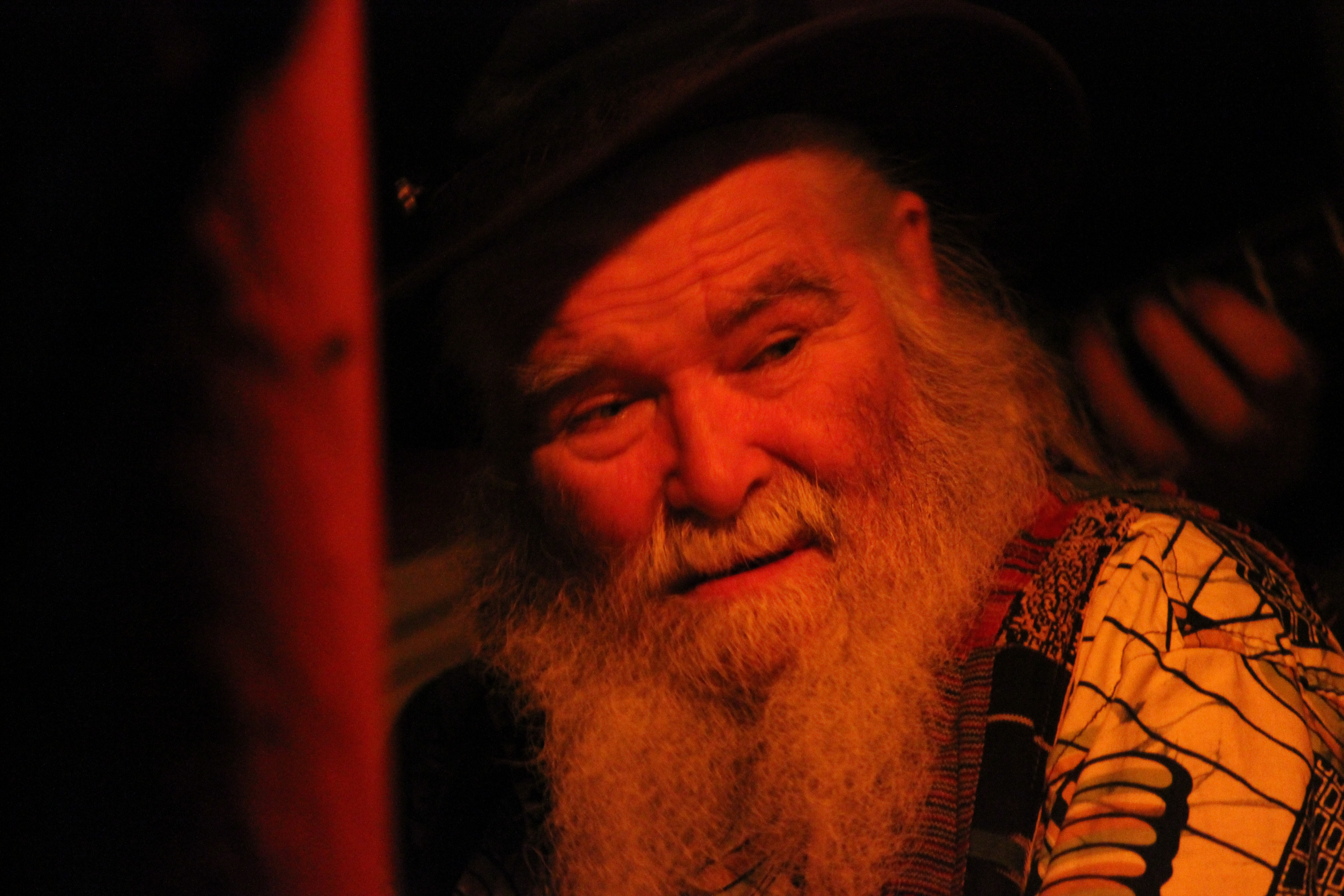
Brox in 2012

Victor Brox (5 May 1941 – 20 February 2023) was an English blues musician.

== Early life and career ==
Born in Ashton-under-Lyne, Lancashire, he attended St Mary's in Droylsden, and William Hulme's Grammar School where he played trombone in the school cadet force band. He studied philosophy at St David's College Lampeter from 1959 to 1962. Brox played a variety of musical instruments including horns, keyboards and guitar, as well as singing.

Brox was described by Jimi Hendrix and Tina Turner as their favourite white blues singer, and he wrote the anthemic song "Warning" on Black Sabbath's first album. Though continuing to perform with the Victor Brox Blues Train, he is most widely known for his performance as Caiaphas on the original recording of Jesus Christ Superstar (1970) and for his collaborations.

Over the course of his career Brox worked with Eric Clapton, Jimi Hendrix, Ritchie Blackmore and Ian Gillan of Deep Purple, Screaming Lord Sutch, Charlie Mingus, Memphis Slim, Dr. John, Aynsley Dunbar, Graham Bond, Alexis Korner, John Mayall, Country Joe McDonald, Peter Bardens, Keith Moon, Dave Wood and Andy Long.

Brox was the lead singer of The Aynsley Dunbar Retaliation in which he also played keyboards (usually the organ), and sometimes the cornet.

Brox appeared as a "look-alike" of Leonardo da Vinci in the film Ever After (uncredited, 1998).

== Personal life and death ==
Brox died on 20 February 2023, at the age of 81.

His daughter Kyla Brox is also a blues musician.
