= Rob Dickinson =

British musician (born 1965)

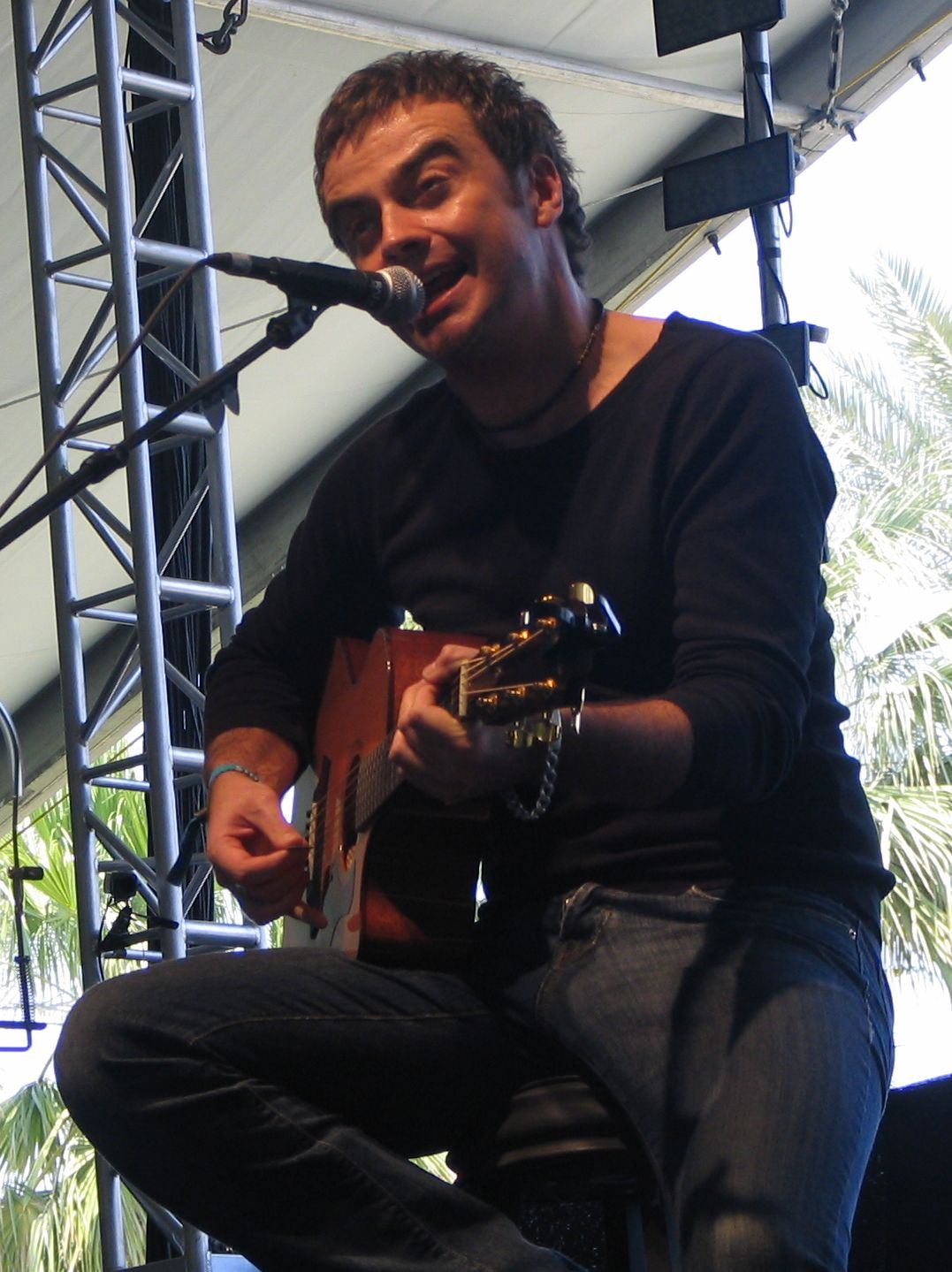
- Rob Dickinson playing live at the 2006 Coachella Valley Music and Arts Festival

Background information
- Born: Robert Dickinson; 23 July 1965 (age 61); Norwich, Norfolk, England
- Genres: Alternative rock, shoegazing
- Occupations: Musician, singer-songwriter, record producer, automobile restorer / modifier
- Instruments: Vocals, guitar, bass, keyboards, drums, harmonica
- Years active: 1985–present
- Labels: Wilde Club, Fontana, Mercury, Columbia, Chrysalis, Sanctuary
- Website: MySpace Facebook: The Catherine Wheel

Robert Dickinson (born 23 July 1965) is a British musician and auto restorer. He came to prominence as the singer for English alternative rock group Catherine Wheel, active 1990 to 2000. Dickinson was raised in Norfolk, England, and is the paternal cousin of Iron Maiden frontman Bruce Dickinson. He is now a solo artist and in 2009 founded Singer Vehicle Design, which performs restoration and modification of client vehicles.

== Career ==
While a member of Catherine Wheel from 1990 to 2000, Dickinson co-wrote and sang lead vocals on several hit singles. The group disbanded after the 2000 release of Wishville.

Dickinson contributed vocals to two tracks on Life Begins Again, a 2005 album by The Jimmy Chamberlin Complex. Later that year Dickinson's solo debut album was released as Fresh Wine for the Horses. The album includes tracks written by Dickinson while a member of Catherine Wheel, as well as newer material. The release was supported by a tour of small venues across the United States and Canada, where Dickinson performed intimate acoustic sets. Dickinson ultimately moved to United States in the same year.

In February 2006, he discussed his new solo record and his career with Catherine Wheel in an interview with Auralgasms.com prior to his solo set in Ferndale, Michigan.

At the invitation of Marty Willson-Piper of The Church, Dickinson toured the US with The Church during July and August 2006, opening each show and joining the band on stage for two encores.

On 10 June 2008, Fresh Wine for the Horses was re-released by Universal/Fontana with the new song "The End of the World" and a bonus disc, "Nude", which features Dickinson's re-workings of six Catherine Wheel songs including "Black Metallic" and "Crank".

His song "The Storm" was featured on an episode of Discovery's series Deadliest Catch.

== Discography ==
=== Solo ===
- Fresh Wine for the Horses (2005)

=== Guest appearances ===
- Provided vocals on the singles Life Begins Again and Love Is Real on the 2005 album Life Begins Again by The Jimmy Chamberlin Complex
- Provided vocals on the single Where We Are on the 2007 album Act 2: The Blood and the Life Eternal by Neverending White Lights
- Provided vocals on the singles Always and The Unbreakable on the 2010 album These Hopeful Machines by BT
- Provided vocals on the 2010 cover single Mercy Street by Spotlight Floodlight, originally recorded by Peter Gabriel for the 1986 album So

=== Videography ===
- "Oceans" (2005), directed by Mike Hodgkinson

== Singer Vehicle Design ==
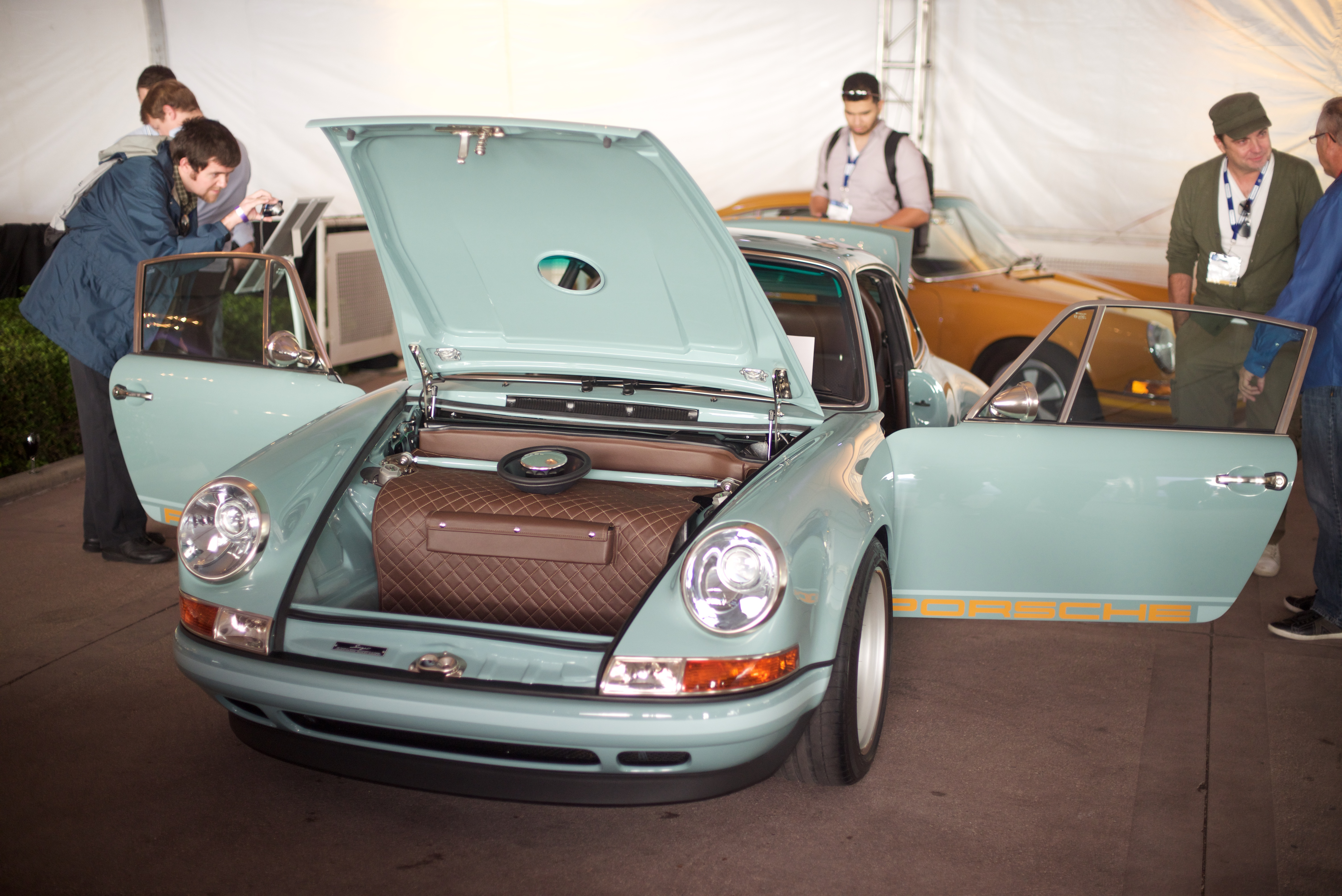
Rob Dickinson (on the right) with a 911 restored by Singer Vehicle Design

In 2009, Dickinson founded Singer Vehicle Design, which restores and modifies the 964 generation of the Porsche 911. The company, located in Los Angeles, California, was named both in honor of Porsche engineer Norbert Singer, and Dickinson's other career as a vocalist.
