= Purple Passages =

Compilation album by Deep Purple
- Released: September 1972 (US)
- Recorded: 1968–1969
- Genres: Psychedelic rock, progressive rock, hard rock
- Length: 69:12
- Label: Warner Bros.
- Producer: Derek Lawrence

Deep Purple compilations chronology
Purple Passages (1972)	Mark I & II (1973)

Singles from Purple Passages
- 1. "Hush" Released: October 1972

Purple Passages is a 1972 double-LP compilation album by Deep Purple released in North America, Venezuela, and Japan only, featuring material originally released in 1968 and 1969 by the Mark I lineup of the band on the Tetragrammaton label. It features classics such as "Hush" and "Kentucky Woman". It was issued in Japan on compact disc in 1993.

This compilation included some alternate mixes of "The Bird Has Flown" and "Why Didn't Rosemary?", with the former having a clean intro instead of a fade-in on the album version. It also included the final Purple Mk. I single "Emmaretta" for the first time on LP. Original lead singer Rod Evans went on to front the popular 1970s band Captain Beyond.

== Track listing ==
=== Side one ===
1. "And the Address" (Blackmore/Lord) – 4.53
2. "Hey Joe" (trad., arr. Lord/Evans/Simper/Paice/Blackmore) – 6.57
3. "Hush" (Joe South) – 4.20
4. "Emmaretta" (Lord/Blackmore/Evans) – 2.58

=== Side two ===
5. "Chasing Shadows" (Lord/Paice) – 5.31
6. "The Bird Has Flown" (Evans/Blackmore/Lord) – 5.30
7. "Why Didn't Rosemary?" (Blackmore/Lord/Evans/Simper/Paice) – 5.00

=== Side three ===
8. "Hard Road (Wring That Neck)" (Blackmore/Lord/Simper/Paice) – 5.11
9. "The Shield" (Blackmore/Evans/Lord) – 6.02
10. "Mandrake Root" (Blackmore/Evans/Lord) – 6.03

=== Side four ===
11. "Kentucky Woman" (Neil Diamond) – 4.44
12. "April" (Blackmore/Lord) – 12.03

== Credits ==
=== Deep Purple ===
- Rod Evans – lead vocals
- Ritchie Blackmore – guitars
- Jon Lord – organ, keyboards, backing vocals
- Nick Simper – bass guitar, backing vocals
- Ian Paice – drums

== Charts ==
Chart (1972)	Peak position
Canada Top Albums/CDs (RPM)	52
US Billboard 200	57

Chart (1975)	Peak position
Japanese Albums (Oricon)	60

== Certifications ==
Region	Certification	Certified units/sales
United States (RIAA)	Gold	500,000^{^}
^{^} Shipments figures based on certification alone.
