= Mark I & II =

Compilation album by Deep Purple
- Released: December 1973
- Recorded: 1968–1972
- Genre: Psychedelic rock; progressive rock; hard rock; heavy metal
- Length: 78:04
- Label: Purple
- Producer: Derek Lawrence, Deep Purple

Deep Purple compilations chronology
Purple Passages (1972)	Mark I & II (1973)	24 Carat Purple (1975)

Mark I & II is a 1973 compilation album by Deep Purple, released by EMI's German subsidiary Electrola. It contains material originally released between 1968 and 1973. This double LP was released after Ian Gillan and Roger Glover had left Deep Purple in June 1973. This compilation was mainly a European release, but was also released in various overseas territories, like Australia and New Zealand.

This is the first album to feature the single A-sides "Emmaretta", "Black Night", and "Strange Kind of Woman", the B-side "When a Blind Man Cries", and the single edit of "Woman from Tokyo". "Highway Star" is the Made in Japan live version.

== Track listing ==
All songs written by Ritchie Blackmore, Ian Gillan, Roger Glover, Jon Lord and Ian Paice except where indicated.

=== Mark I ===
Side one

1. "Hush" (Joe South) – 4.22
2. "Mandrake Root" (Ritchie Blackmore/Rod Evans/Jon Lord) – 6.03
3. "Why Didn't Rosemary?" (Blackmore/Lord/Evans/Nick Simper/Ian Paice) – 4.56
4. "Hey Joe" (Billy Roberts) – 7.21

Side two

5. "Wring That Neck" (Blackmore/Lord/Simper/Paice) – 5.11
6. "Emmaretta" (Lord/Blackmore/Evans) – 2.58
7. "Help!" (Lennon/McCartney) – 6.02
8. "Chasing Shadows" (Lord/Paice) – 5.31

=== Mark II ===
Side three

9. "Black Night" – 3.29
10. "Speed King" – 5.49
11. "Strange Kind of Woman" – 4.00
12. "Into the Fire" – 3.29
13. "When a Blind Man Cries" – 3.29

Side four

14. "Smoke on the Water" – 5.49
15. "Woman from Tokyo" – 2.44
16. "Highway Star" – 6.46

== Personnel ==
Mark I

- Rod Evans – lead vocals
- Ritchie Blackmore – guitars
- Jon Lord – organ, backing vocals
- Nick Simper – bass, vocals
- Ian Paice – drums

Mark II

- Ian Gillan – lead vocals
- Ritchie Blackmore – guitars
- Jon Lord – keyboards, organ
- Roger Glover – bass, vocals
- Ian Paice – drums, percussion

== Charts ==
Chart (1974)	Peak position
German Albums (Offizielle Top 100)	18
