= Legs Diamond (disambiguation) =

Legs Diamond was a gangster in Philadelphia and New York.

Legs Diamond may also refer to:

- Legs Diamond (musical), a 1988 musical written by Peter Allen
- Legs Diamond (band), an American rock and roll band
  - Legs Diamond (album)

== See also ==
- Legz Diamond, an American guitarist from Detroit, Michigan
