= And the Address =

Deep Purple song

Song by Deep Purple

from the album Shades of Deep Purple
- Released: July 1968
- Recorded: 11 May 1968
- Length: 4:38
- Label: Tetragrammaton (US); Parlophone (UK)
- Songwriter(s): Ritchie Blackmore, Jon Lord
- Producer(s): Derek Lawrence

"And the Address"

Song by Deep Purple

from the album Whoosh!
- Released: 7 August 2020
- Length: 3:35
- Label: earMUSIC
- Songwriter(s): Ritchie Blackmore, Jon Lord
- Producer(s): Bob Ezrin

"And the Address" is a song by English group Deep Purple. It appears on their debut Shades of Deep Purple and on their 2020 album Whoosh!.

== Early history ==
The song is the very first composed by the band. It was written by Ritchie Blackmore and Jon Lord before the formation of the group, but the two knew that they would get a band together soon, as they had been hired by musician Chris Curtis to get something started. This was because Curtis had met Lord whilst on the hunt for some session-players. Lord soon learned about a young guitarist named Ritchie Blackmore, apparently of exceptional talent, from bassist Nick Simper who would also join Deep Purple.

== Composition ==
The duo's cooperation with Curtis didn't work though, as the latter tended to be much too directorial and supposedly "in charge". Lord and Blackmore continued to work together, as they enjoyed playing together. Soon they were on the hunt for other musicians so they could start a band. In December 1967, at Jon Lord's home in London, he and Blackmore discussed the possibilities for a potential project together. It was at this time they began writing some tunes: "And the Address", then "Mandrake Root" (initially another instrumental which would eventually have lyrics added).

The song itself opens with an organ intro and four power chords, followed by a main theme repeated twice. This is followed by guitar solo, main theme, organ solo, and the main theme to close.

== Recording and continuation ==
After the band's lineup was fulfilled, they began recording the album Shades of Deep Purple in May. "And the Address" was the first song to be recorded, on 11 May 1968. After the release of the album, the song was played at many live shows, and it would be played until the release of The Book of Taliesyn, later in 1968. This newer album featured another instrumental, "Wring That Neck", also called "Hard Road" in the US. This instrumental would prove more popular than "And the Address", and therefore it was dropped in favor of the newcomer at live shows. "Wring That Neck" has stayed on Deep Purple's set-lists even to the present day. "And the Address" has almost never been played in concert after 1968, but its opening four power chords would later serve as an introduction to the Mk. II song "Speed King" when it was played live.

== Whoosh! ==
A rerecorded version of the track appeared on Deep Purple's 2020 album Whoosh!. The only musician both recordings had in common was drummer Ian Paice.
