= Deep Purple (album) =

1969 studio album by Deep Purple

- Cover art. Picture shown: "The Garden of Earthly Delights" (right panel) by Hieronymus Bosch (c. 1503), on the bottom part: Ritchie Blackmore, Rod Evans, Nick Simper, Jon Lord and Ian Paice.

Studio album by Deep Purple
- Released: June 1969
- Recorded: January–March 1969
- Studios: De Lane Lea, Kingsway, London
- Genres: Hard rock; psychedelic rock; progressive rock
- Length: 44:34
- Labels: Tetragrammaton (US); Harvest (UK)
- Producer: Derek Lawrence

Deep Purple chronology
| The Book of Taliesyn (1968) | Deep Purple (1969) | Concerto for Group and Orchestra (1969) |

Remastered re-issue cover

Deep Purple, also referred to as Deep Purple III, is the third studio album by the English rock band Deep Purple, released in June 1969 on Tetragrammaton Records in the United States, but not until September 1969 on Harvest Records in the United Kingdom. Its release was preceded by the single "Emmaretta" and by a long tour in the UK, whose dates were interspersed between the album's recording sessions.

The music of this album is mostly original and a combination of progressive rock, hard rock and psychedelic rock, but with a harder edge and with the guitar parts in more evidence than in the past. This was due both to the growth of guitarist Ritchie Blackmore as a songwriter and to the conflicts within the band over the fusion of classical music and rock proposed by keyboard player Jon Lord and amply implemented in the band's previous releases.

The band started their second US tour in April 1969 with little support from their almost-bankrupt American label and without an album to promote, because of a delay in the manufacturing of the new LP. During the tour, Deep Purple showed a remarkable progress as performers and a musical direction more oriented towards a heavier and louder sound than before. Doubts about the compatibility of vocalist Rod Evans with the hard rock music that other band members wanted to pursue brought about the decision to search for a substitute, which was found in Ian Gillan of the band Episode Six. Gillan had formed a songwriting duo with Episode Six's bassist Roger Glover, who was also invited to join Deep Purple and replace Nick Simper. The band's new line-up, identified as Mark II, debuted live in London on 10 July 1969.

This was the least commercially successful of the three albums released by the band's Mark I line-up, and was ignored by critics upon its release. Modern reviews are generally positive, and remark on the variety of styles within the album and the boldness of the song arrangements.

== Background ==
In late 1968, Deep Purple had embarked on a successful first US tour to promote their second album The Book of Taliesyn, and returned home on 3 January 1969. The band was considered an underground act in the United Kingdom, but word of their success in America had influenced their reputation at home, as they gradually rose in popularity and request. However, their releases had yet to make an impact in the UK, where their second single, a cover of Neil Diamond's "Kentucky Woman", had not charted and was retired after six weeks, after having peaked at No. 38 in the United States and No. 21 in Canada.

Deep Purple's American label Tetragrammaton Records pressured the band to make a single to match the success of their hit "Hush", and the band had tried to satisfy that request while still in the US for the last dates of their tour; they recorded some covers in a New York studio in December 1968, without worthwhile results. The musicians had come up with much more complex original material for their second album, and making a song that would easily fit the three-minute range was apparently becoming difficult.

A few days after their US tour, Deep Purple settled in with their usual producer Derek Lawrence at De Lane Lea Studios in Kingsway, London, already used for The Book of Taliesyn sessions, to compose and record new songs and solve the new single problem. The song "Emmaretta" (named after the musical Hair cast member Emmaretta Marks, whom singer Rod Evans had met in the US) was composed for that purpose and recorded on 7 January 1969, after four takes. The heavier and more experimental song "The Bird Has Flown" was arranged and recorded later on the same day and was chosen as the B-side for the US release. The instrumental "Wring That Neck" from their previous album was the B-side of the British edition of "Emmaretta", which was issued in February 1969 and promoted by Deep Purple in their first full UK tour. This was the first time that a Deep Purple release appeared in the UK before the US. The tour started in Birmingham on 6 February with a concert broadcast by BBC Radio 1, and went on as a series of one-nighters in clubs and colleges across the country during February and March. Deep Purple's greater visibility and their declared interest in the British public induced local music magazines to print a few articles on them. However, after keyboard player and spokesperson Jon Lord publicly stated that they would play large arenas for £2500 per show in America then come home and only be able to book small venues paying £150 a night, typical headlines were "Purple won't starve for an ideal" and "They lose £2350 a night working in Britain".

== Writing and recording ==
The band's management organized the spare time from the UK tour to record new songs for a third album over the course of February and March 1969 at De Lane Lea Studios, with Lawrence as producer and Barry Ainsworth as sound engineer. The pressure of the multiple engagements left the band very little time for composition and most of the tracks were written and rehearsed in the studio. Deep Purple was the band's third album to be recorded, even though they had been together for less than one year. According to Nick Simper: "Recording was always a problem. We were always short of material, purely because of our schedule. The fact that we were always being chased by Tetragrammaton for material, we never had the luxury like most bands do now of saying, 'hang on fellas, we need a little bit of down time to just think about stuff and try and be creative.'" Added Blackmore: "That really bugs me...going to the studio, 'right, you gotta turn out an LP, boys.' You know, 'here we go, you gotta write a song...today.' It’s just ridiculous."

The musicians were now starting to fully endeavour to write original material and found ideas for seven songs, more than on either of their first two albums. Musical and lyrical inspiration came from very disparate sources. The opener "Chasing Shadows" was based on African rhythms created by drummer Ian Paice with lyrics inspired by one of Jon Lord's nightmares. The baroque "Blind" was written by Lord and largely performed on harpsichord. The short instrumental "Fault Line" was inspired by an earthquake that the band had experienced while in Los Angeles and featured Paice's drum patterns reversed and double tracked. "Fault Line" served as an intro to the blues rocker "The Painter". Roman Polanski's movie Rosemary's Baby, which the band members had watched together at a cinema, was the main inspiration for the blues-based "Why Didn't Rosemary?" The song's lyrics pose the question, "Why didn't Rosemary ever take the pill?". "April" was a tune written by guitarist Ritchie Blackmore about his birthday month before the recording sessions had begun; it was later augmented with a long middle section of classical music written by Lord, becoming the album's 12-minute-plus final track and Deep Purple's longest ever studio recording. The only cover song on the album is the Donovan-penned ballad "Lalena", which had been a Top 40 single for its author in the US in the autumn of 1968.

The first new song to be publicly performed was titled "Hey Bop a Re Bop", which aired on the Top Gear radio show on 14 January 1969. It was broadcast again on 11 February before being reworked and becoming the psychedelic blues song "The Painter".

Although most recording dates are lost, it is known that the band recorded two songs on 17 February. "Lalena" and most of "April" were recorded on 28 February, while a new version of "The Bird Has Flown", retitled "Bird Has Flown", was put on tape on 28 March. The orchestral part of "April" played by hired musicians was the last recording for the yet-unnamed album, which was mixed and delivered by the end of March.

== Musical style ==
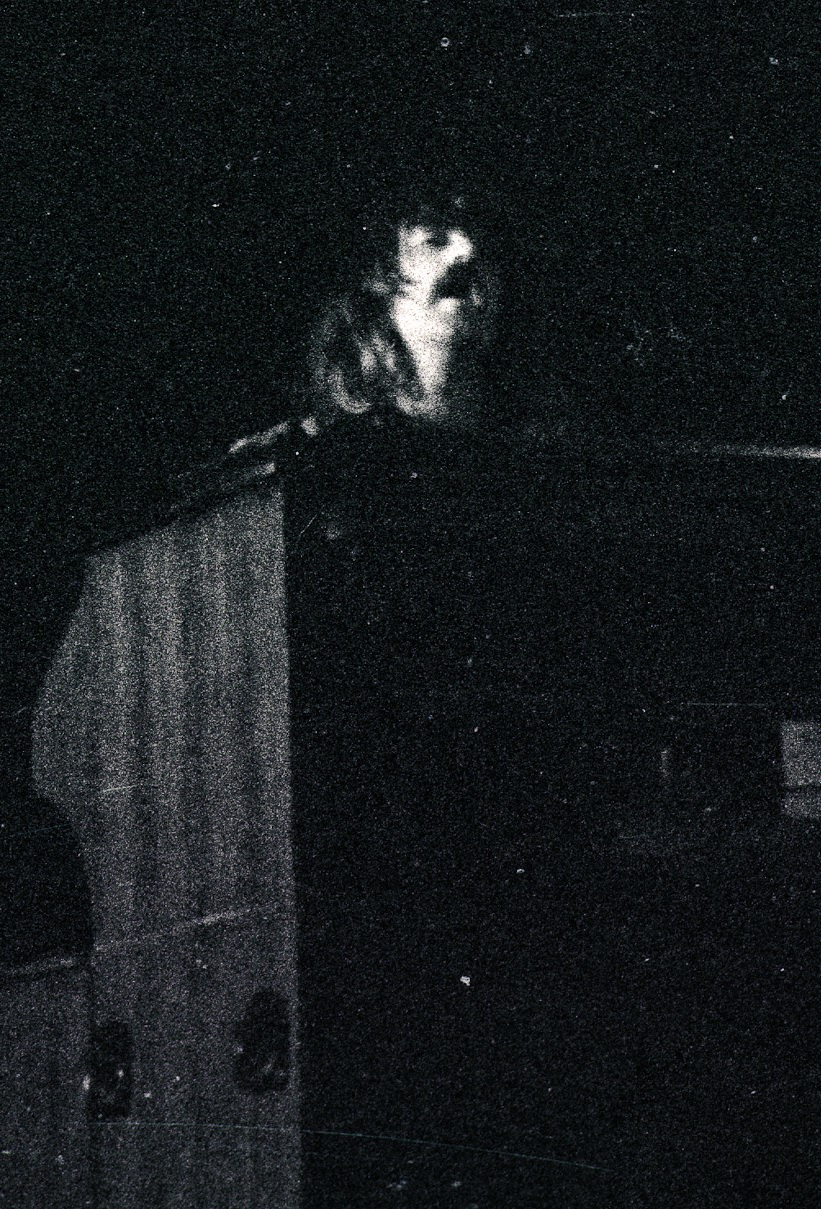
Jon Lord was Deep Purple's spokesperson and the only band member with whom their managers talked.

As is the case with most of the material on their previous two albums, the songs of Deep Purple mix elements of progressive rock, hard rock and psychedelic rock, but this time in a darker and more baroque atmosphere. Perhaps in response to British audiences craving more blues-based rock, the band also incorporated a 12-bar blues structure on the songs "The Painter" and "Why Didn't Rosemary?" "Emmaretta" is a pop rock song written to be a commercial single, but the sound of the album is heavier and more guitar-oriented than previous works, similar to how the band sounded live during this period.

By the third album, certain people were hiding themselves away creating stuff in secret, purely because they didn't want anybody to share in the finances.

— Nick Simper

Lord had been the main writer on the first two albums and his classical music upbringing and interest in fusing classical and rock had profoundly influenced the direction taken by the band. Blackmore compared the organ-heavy mix of those releases to the works of British progressive rock band the Nice, who featured Keith Emerson on keyboards. On Deep Purple Lord still had a great influence, which found maximum expression in the harpsichord-flavoured "Blind" and in the orchestral section of "April", an original piece for choir and string quartet that he composed despite being hard at work in writing and arranging his Concerto for Group and Orchestra. Lord's dominance waned some in this release as more writing and performing space was given to Blackmore, who delivered his longest and, for some critics, best guitar solos to date. Critics also remark Paice's progress as performer, especially on the "tribal" opening track "Chasing Shadows" where he had his first chance at songwriting. Bass player Nick Simper later stated that "there was a lot of pressure from Jon Lord to do this kind of semi-classical stuff [and] we didn't actually rebel against it until the third album."

Psychedelic rock had been another main influence in the first two Deep Purple albums, but it was rapidly going out of fashion; the musicians ceased their exploration of the genre in this album with songs such as "The Painter" and "Bird Has Flown", dedicating themselves completely to the trendier hard rock genre in the following studio releases.

== Cover art ==
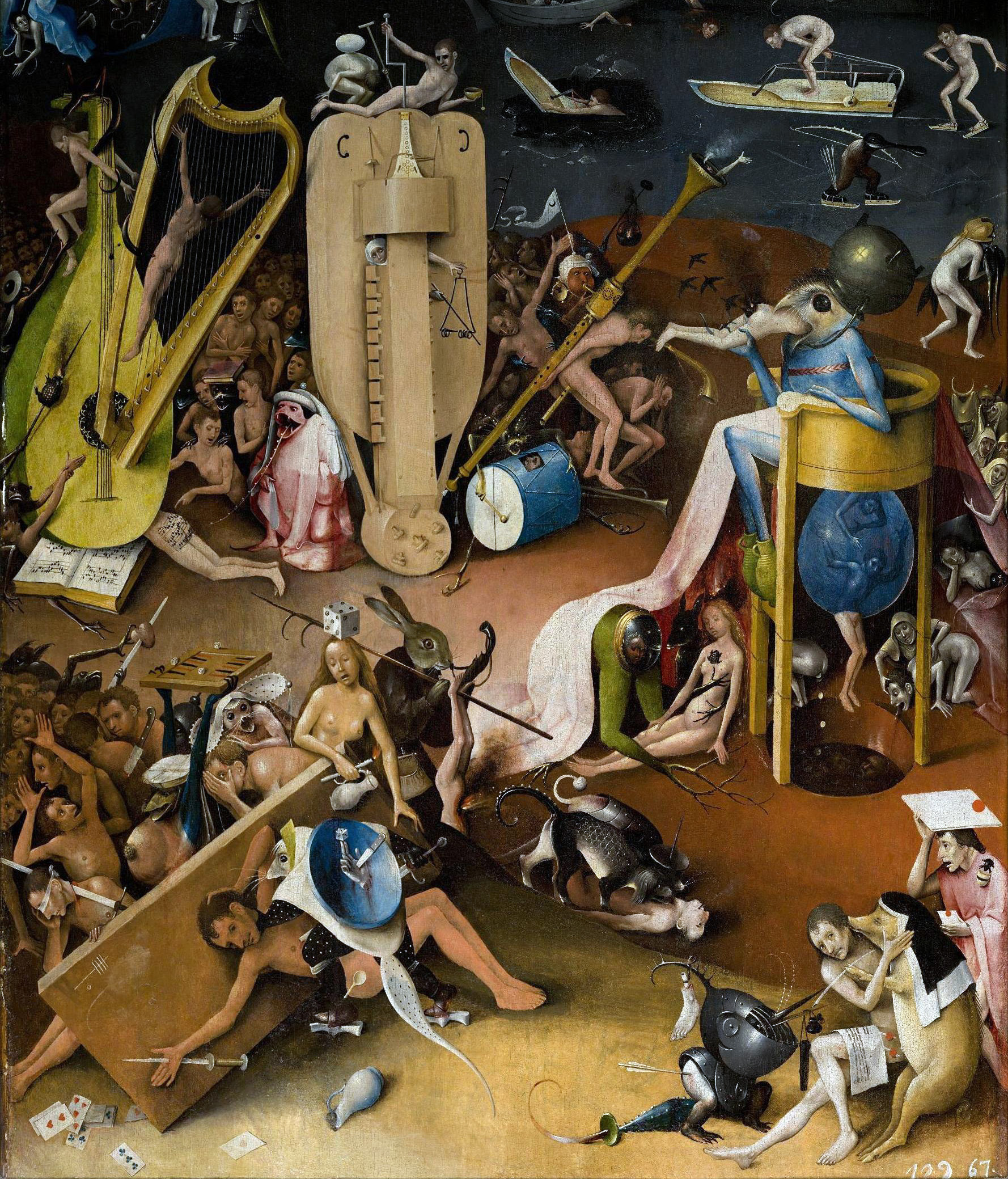
A detail of the right panel of the triptych The Garden of Earthly Delights painted in the late 15th century by Dutch master Hieronymus Bosch, depicting Hell in a highly symbolic fashion.

Tetragrammaton issued the album in a stark gatefold sleeve, wrapped around with a segmented illustration from Hieronymus Bosch's painting The Garden of Earthly Delights. The label ran into difficulty over the use of the Museo del Prado-owned painting, which was incorrectly perceived in the US as being anti-religious, featuring immoral scenes, and was thus rejected or poorly stocked by many record shops. The original painting is in colour, although it appeared on the LP in monochrome due to a printing error for the original layout, and the band opted to keep it that way. Another section of the same Bosch painting (in colour) had been used as an album cover two years earlier, by Pearls Before Swine on their debut One Nation Underground.

== Release and promotion ==
Tetragrammaton Records had been active only for a year, but was on the brink of bankruptcy in the US. Its initial solid financial foundation had been quickly eroded by expensive promotional campaigns and by failed commercial strategies. Deep Purple were the label's most successful artist, but the band had not been able to produce another hit single like "Hush" and their latest release "Emmaretta", out just in time for their second US tour in April 1969, was also largely unsuccessful and failed to affect the US charts. The label's financial distress caused a delay in the printing of Deep Purple, which was released in the US only in June 1969, after the band had returned home having completed their US tour.

In the UK, "Lalena" and "The Painter" were performed live on 24 June 1969 at a BBC Radio session. The album was released in the UK in September 1969 on EMI's sub-label Harvest Records, around the same time as the much-hyped event Concerto for Group and Orchestra held at the Royal Albert Hall in London. At that time Deep Purple's line-up had already changed. The album was distributed in Canada and Japan in October 1969 by Polydor Records.

Deep Purple was reissued very few times and only in Europe, often in a set with the two other albums recorded by the Mark I line-up. The only other international reissue of the album is the Remastered 2000 CD edition by EMI, which contains versions of "The Bird Has Flown", "Emmaretta" and live performances taken from BBC Radio sessions as bonus tracks. All the songs were digitally remastered by Peter Mew at Abbey Road Studios in London.

== Touring ==
While the band was recording the new album and touring in the UK, their managers at HEC Enterprises had found an agreement for Deep Purple to support the Rolling Stones in their upcoming US tour during Spring 1969, the first in three years and a certain sold-out event. Unfortunately, the Rolling Stones decided to spend more time at Olympic Studios in London to record their album Let It Bleed and postponed their tour. Thus, in early April 1969 Deep Purple were on their way back to the US to start off a two-month coast-to-coast tour as headliners which, similarly to what had happened in Britain, brought them mainly to small clubs and colleges. This time their trek also touched Canada, where their albums were distributed by Polydor Records.

Upon arrival on US soil, Deep Purple found out that Tetragrammaton had not yet found the resources to manufacture their now finished album and could offer very little financial support to the tour. Contrary to what happened in the past, when the American label had spent much money in advance for promotion and people who saw the band on the road could find stacks of LPs and singles for sale at every concert, this time the single "Emmaretta" and the band's back-catalogue remained sitting on store shelves. In fact, the band experienced some economic limitations during the tour and asked their manager John Coletta to fly back home, so the hotel bills would be reduced. Coletta later commented on how 1969 was a wasted year for Deep Purple in America.

Even though their most recent single was doing poorly, Deep Purple maintained a reputation as a fine live act in the US. The band had now begun to develop their stage presence into something grander, going in a louder and heavier direction and focusing more and more on the instrumental interplay between Blackmore and Lord. In particular the latter had found a way to short-circuit the original Leslie speakers of his Hammond C-3 organ and connect the instrument directly into the stacks of Marshall amps, obtaining a roaring sound and matching the guitar in loudness.

It wasn't until Led Zeppelin came along that we had a direction.

— Ritchie Blackmore

Despite having turned into a highly proficient band on stage, things were starting to heat up internally, with band members getting more vocal about the direction they wanted the music to go, as well as being dissatisfied with their treatment financially. Simper remarked in later interviews, "Once we started making money, the friendships went out the window." He further noted that Blackmore was particularly peeved that Lord and Evans were earning royalties above and beyond the other band members because they had composed the B-side of the "Hush" single ("One More Rainy Day"). Meanwhile, Lord and Blackmore were tired of being identified as a "clone of Vanilla Fudge" and were starting to yearn for a sharper, rawer and overall heavier sound, similar to that introduced in Led Zeppelin's debut album, which had become a great success on both sides of the Atlantic, after its release in January 1969. They felt that Rod Evans, with his tender, smooth voice, would not be able to cope with louder, more aggressive material. Evans had also expressed reservations about his permanence in the band and voiced his wish to permanently move to the US. Tensions were also high with bassist Nick Simper, whose playing style was considered, in Paice's words, "stuck in the late '50s and early '60s" by the other band members and unfit for the new musical direction they wanted to pursue. On the other hand, Simper sided with Blackmore against Lord's excessive influence in the band's songwriting and was critical of classical music getting in the way of harder rock. As a result of those tensions, communication between band members was at a minimum during the tour. It was in May that Lord and Blackmore agreed on changing the line-up, shifting out Evans. They talked their ideas over with drummer Paice, gaining his agreement to the line-up change. Coletta was surprised when he heard the trio's news, advising them to keep quiet about it until the tour was completed and they had returned home.

=== Line-up changes ===
Back in England in early June, the decision taken had to be kept secret until the promotional tour for the British release of The Book of Taliesyn was completed. Meanwhile, the search for a new singer to replace Evans began and Blackmore asked for help in this task from his old acquaintance Mick Underwood, at the time drummer of the British rock band Episode Six. Underwood recommended Episode Six singer Ian Gillan, whom Blackmore and Lord contacted at a London gig. Gillan, who did not see a future in his then current band, was enthusiastic about joining Deep Purple and involved bassist Roger Glover, with whom he formed a songwriting duo. According to Simper, his replacement by Glover was initially not planned and was due to the creative togetherness of the two Episode Six members. Gillan convinced the reluctant Glover to audition for Deep Purple and the two soon found themselves torn between the new band, which gladly welcomed both of them, and obligations with Episode Six for the completion of a UK tour. Evans, Simper and Episode Six's management were kept unaware of these events and of the fact that the new line-up was already active in writing and rehearsing new songs. In between gigs all over the country, Deep Purple had rehearsed the song "Hallelujah" with Evans and Simper to be released as a new single, but it was recorded in secret on 7 June by the fresh Mark II line-up at De Lane Lea Studios instead, with Glover still acting as a session musician. The final show of the Mark I lineup was in Cardiff on 4 July 1969, and the Mark II lineup debuted live at The Speakeasy Club in London on 10 July. The final show played by Gillan and Glover with Episode Six was in Little Bardfield on 26 July 1969. The single "Hallelujah" was released in late July in the US and the UK and featured an edited version of "April" as B-side, the final original appearance on vinyl of the Mark I formation.

After his dismissal, Evans left for the US with his wife and resurfaced in 1971 as lead singer in the American progressive rock band Captain Beyond. Simper sued Deep Purple's management for breaking his contract, and the dispute was settled economically out of court. He later formed the rock band Warhorse.

The music of the album Deep Purple was played only during the tours of 1969 and never performed again by other line-ups, though Simper played songs from the first three Deep Purple albums with the tribute band Nasty Habits in Europe in 2010.

== Commercial and critical reception ==
Professional ratings
Review scores
| Source | Rating |
|---|---|
| AllMusic | 4.5/5 stars |
| PopMatters | 6/10 |
| Collector's Guide to Heavy Metal | 7/10 |

Deep Purple was practically ignored by the music press in the US upon its release in June 1969 and bounced up and down on the Billboard 200 chart for a few weeks, peaking at No. 162 and not coming close to the success of its two predecessors. Tetragrammaton's financial problems were partially to blame, for promotion was lackluster, but the lack of a hit single to be aired on FM radio or a tour in support of the album were also important factors.

In the UK, the single "Emmaretta" did not convince critics and buying public and failed to chart. At the time of release, Deep Purple was generally ignored by the British music press, more focused on the eventful Concerto for Group and Orchestra than on an album by an extinct line-up. The album was a slow seller in Europe, but eventually was certified Gold in Germany in 1990.

Modern reviews are generally positive. AllMusic's Bruce Eder calls the album "one of the most bracing progressive rock albums ever, and a successful vision of a musical path that the group might have taken but didn't", remarking how Deep Purple succeeded in combining "heavy metal's early, raw excitement, intensity, and boldness with progressive rock's complexity and intellectual scope." Jedd Beaudoin of PopMatters appreciates in his review the heavier sound of the songs and notices how "Evans sounds more and more out of place in a band that was increasingly more comfortable with stretching itself beyond the confines of pure pop pieces", like in the track "April", which he considers not only "the most ambitious thing on the entire record, but also arguably the best." David Bowling, in his Blogcritics column, reviews the album as "the least satisfying of their three early career releases, although it can also be considered their most adventurous" for its "meandering through a number of different styles and sounds." However, considering the growth shown by Blackmore and Lord as performers in this release, he concludes that it is "a fitting conclusion to the band's formative years." Martin Popoff praised the album for being "stronger, more aggressive and much better recorded" than "either of the first two records", showing the original work of "a strangely soulful psych band distinguished", with the exception of singer Evans, "by its hard-hitting players".

== Legacy ==
The track "April" served as inspiration for the music written for The Legend of Zelda, an action-adventure game released in 1986 for the Nintendo Entertainment System. The inspiration is most clearly heard in the "Title Theme" and "Dungeon Theme". Koji Kondo, the composer of the game, has confirmed that he draws inspiration from many 1970s rock bands, including Deep Purple.

== Track listing ==
All credits adapted from the original releases.

Side one
| No. | Title | Writer(s) | Length |
|---|---|---|---|
| 1. | "Chasing Shadows" | Jon Lord, Ian Paice | 5:34 |
| 2. | "Blind" | Lord | 5:26 |
| 3. | "Lalena" (Donovan cover) | Donovan Leitch | 5:05 |
| 4. | "Fault Line" (instrumental) | Ritchie Blackmore, Nick Simper, Lord, Paice | 1:46 |
| 5. | "The Painter" | Lord, Blackmore, Rod Evans, Paice, Simper | 3:51 |

Side two
| No. | Title | Writer(s) | Length |
|---|---|---|---|
| 6. | "Why Didn't Rosemary?" | Blackmore, Lord, Evans, Simper, Paice | 5:04 |
| 7. | "Bird Has Flown" | Evans, Blackmore, Lord | 5:36 |
| 8. | "April" | Blackmore, Lord | 12:10 |

Remastered CD edition bonus tracks
| No. | Title | Writer(s) | Length |
|---|---|---|---|
| 9. | "Bird Has Flown" (Alternate A-side version) | Lord, Evans, Blackmore | 2:54 |
| 10. | "Emmaretta" (Studio B-side) | Lord, Evans, Blackmore | 3:00 |
| 11. | "Emmaretta" (BBC Top Gear session, 14 January 1969) | Lord, Evans, Blackmore | 3:09 |
| 12. | "Lalena" (BBC radio session; 24 June 1969) | Leitch | 3:33 |
| 13. | "The Painter" (BBC radio session; 24 June 1969) | Blackmore, Evans, Lord, Simper, Paice | 2:18 |

== Personnel ==
Deep Purple

- Rod Evans – lead vocals
- Ritchie Blackmore – guitars
- Nick Simper – bass guitar, backing vocals
- Jon Lord – organ, backing vocals; claves on "Chasing Shadows"; harpsichord on "Blind"; piano, string and woodwind arrangement on "April"
- Ian Paice – drums; timbales, maracas, and cowbell on "Chasing Shadows"; timpani on "April"

Additional musicians

- Unidentified musicians: two flutes, two oboes, one cor Anglais, two clarinets, two violins, one viola, and two cellos on "April"

Production

- Deep Purple – liner notes
- Derek Lawrence – producer, mixing
- Barry Ainsworth – engineer
- Michael Savino – art director
- David Anthony – photographer
- Hieronymus Bosch – cover paintings
- Peter Mew – restoring and remastering at Abbey Road Studios, London (2000)
