= Shades of Deep Purple =

1968 studio album by Deep Purple

- UK album cover. From top to bottom: Nick Simper, Jon Lord, Ritchie Blackmore, Rod Evans, Ian Paice.

Studio album by Deep Purple
- Released: 17 July 1968
- Recorded: 11–13 May 1968
- Studios: Pye, London
- Genres: Psychedelic rock; progressive rock; pop rock; hard rock
- Length: 43:33
- Labels: Tetragrammaton (US); Parlophone (UK)
- Producer: Derek Lawrence

Deep Purple chronology
Shades of Deep Purple (1968)	The Book of Taliesyn (1968)

Singles from Shades of Deep Purple
- 1. "Hush" Released: 21 June 1968

Shades of Deep Purple is the debut album by the English rock band Deep Purple, released in July 1968 on Tetragrammaton in the United States and in September 1968 on Parlophone in the United Kingdom. The band, initially called Roundabout, was the idea of former Searchers drummer Chris Curtis, who recruited Jon Lord and Ritchie Blackmore before leaving the project. The Mk. I line-up of the band was completed by vocalist/frontman Rod Evans, along with bassist Nick Simper and drummer Ian Paice, in March 1968.

After about two months of rehearsals, Shades of Deep Purple was recorded in only three days in May 1968 and contains four original songs and four covers, thoroughly rearranged to include classical interludes and sound more psychedelic. Stylistically, the music is close to psychedelic rock and progressive rock, two genres with an ever-growing audience in the late 1960s.

The album was not well received in the UK, where it sold very few copies and did not chart. In North America, on the other hand, it was a success, reaching number 24 on the US Billboard 200 and number 19 on the Canadian RPM chart. The single "Hush", an energetic rock track written by Joe South and originally recorded by Billy Joe Royal, became very popular at the time, reaching number 4 on the US Billboard Hot 100 chart. The good sales of the album and the intense radio play of the single contributed largely to the attention Deep Purple would get in their early US tours and also during the 1970s. Modern reviews of the album are generally positive and consider Shades of Deep Purple an important piece in the history of Deep Purple.

== Background ==
When Deep Purple's first line-up came together in 1967, there was a moment of transition for the British music scene. Beat was still popular, especially in dance halls and outside the capital, but the tastes of young people buying records and filling up the clubs was rapidly changing in favour of blues rock, progressive rock and psychedelic rock. New bands like The Moody Blues, Procol Harum, and The Nice were pioneers in combining classical music with rock, using complex and daring arrangements. At the same time, psychedelia was making strides in the hedonistic swinging London society, where bands like Pink Floyd, The Pretty Things, The Jimi Hendrix Experience, Traffic and Cream experimented with different forms of drug-induced rock music, in line with the hippie subculture coming from the USA. Many well-known acts, including The Beatles, The Rolling Stones and The Who, were influenced by the changing feel and added many elements of progressive and psychedelic rock to their albums of that period.

During this time of great creativity for the British musical scene in the summer of 1967, Chris Curtis, former drummer of the beat band The Searchers, contacted London businessman Tony Edwards to find financing for a new group he was putting together, to be called Roundabout. The name meant that the group would contain a revolving cast of non-permanent members getting on and off the stage like a musical roundabout, with only Curtis as mainstay and singer. Impressed with the plan, Edwards agreed to finance and manage the venture with two business partners, Ron Hire and John Coletta, and the three of them founded Hire-Edwards-Coletta (HEC) Enterprises.

(Chris Curtis) is a strange guy, but he's so eccentric, he's a really good bloke.(...) I think he got into drugs and started to get silly, unfortunately, for he did get everyone together. It was his band. For what it was worth a very important person: without Chris Curtis it would not have happened.

— Ritchie Blackmore

In September 1967, the first successful Roundabout recruitment was Curtis' flatmate, the classically trained Hammond organ player Jon Lord; he had most notably played with The Artwoods, a band led by Art Wood, brother of future Rolling Stones guitarist Ronnie Wood, and featuring Keef Hartley. At that time, Lord was playing in a band backing the successful pop vocalists The Flower Pot Men called The Garden, which also included bassist Nick Simper and drummer Carlo Little. Simper and Little were alerted by Lord of the Roundabout project and remained in standby for an eventual involvement. They recommended to Lord the guitarist Ritchie Blackmore, whose playing Chris Curtis had appreciated when his band The Searchers had played at the Star-Club in Hamburg, Germany. Blackmore had been a member of The Outlaws and had played as a session and live musician with many beat, pop and rock acts, including Screaming Lord Sutch and the Savages, where he had met Little. Curtis contacted Blackmore to audition for the new group and persuaded him to move from Hamburg, where he was hanging out in local clubs. The guitarist came back to England for good to join the group in December 1967. Meanwhile, Curtis' erratic behaviour and his sudden loss of interest in the project he had started slowed down any development, forcing his financiers, HEC Enterprises, to drop him and entrust Lord and Blackmore with the task of filling out the rest of the band.

Lord signed up as bassist his friend Simper, whose fame at the time came from his membership in the rock and roll group Johnny Kidd & The Pirates and for having survived the car crash in 1966 that killed Kidd. The line-up of Roundabout was completed by drummer Bobby Woodman, recruited by Blackmore. Dave Curtiss, an acquaintance of Woodman, was at first considered as singer, but he left to fulfill previous commitments. According to Simper, Ian Gillan, the singer of the band Episode Six, was also contacted for an audition, but declined the offer.

== Early development ==
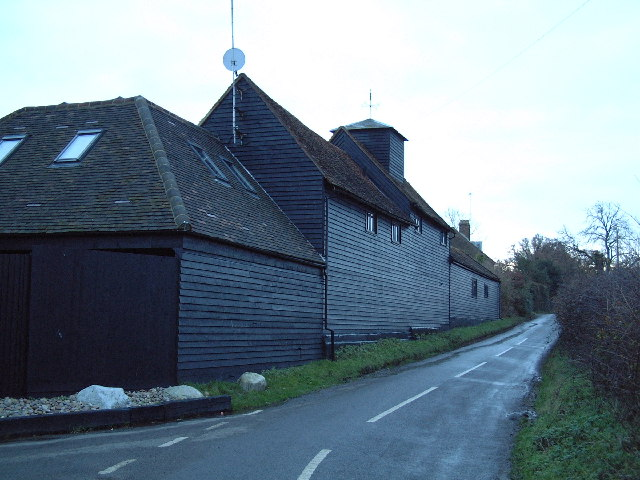
Deeves Hall was rented by Tony Edwards as residence for the band and equipped with stacks of Marshall amps and new instruments.

Roundabout moved into Deeves Hall, a rented old farmhouse near the village of South Mimms, Hertfordshire in late February 1968. There, while waiting for the arrival of new musical instruments and equipment, they continued the search for a singer through an advertisement in the British music paper Melody Maker. Rod Stewart was among the dozens of aspiring vocalists that were considered for the auditions, but was not up to the standards the band required. They chose Rod Evans instead, who was already the singer of the club band The Maze. Evans brought along after the audition his 19-year-old bandmate Ian Paice, a drummer whom Blackmore recognised from his days in Hamburg. They quickly improvised an audition for Paice and he was chosen on the spot to replace Woodman behind the drum kit. Woodman was unhappy with the direction the band was heading and the other members thought that he was not suited for their sound.

The first rehearsals of what would be known as the Mk. I line-up of Deep Purple involved mostly jamming and some work on the instrumentals "And the Address" and "Mandrake Root", which Blackmore and Lord had written earlier that year. Mandrake Root was also the name of an earlier band that Blackmore had been trying to form in Germany, before being contacted by Roundabout's management. After the two instrumentals, the first proper song to be arranged was "Help!", a Beatles cover that Chris Curtis wanted to include in an eventual album. Evans wrote some lyrics for "Mandrake Root" and reduced to one the number of instrumental tracks. Having arranged and rehearsed the first three songs, the musicians focused their attention on "I'm So Glad", a song by Skip James which had earlier been covered by Cream and The Maze. The next addition during rehearsals was "Hey Joe", a song originally, but disputably, written by Billy Roberts and mistakenly credited to Deep Purple on original releases of the album. The main inspiration for the new arrangement of the song was the 1966 hit version by American guitarist Jimi Hendrix, but the track length was stretched with the inclusion of classical-influenced instrumental sections. The band also selected a pop rock song called "Hush", written by Joe South for Billy Joe Royal the previous year, which Blackmore had heard while in Germany.

== Recording ==
With a possible set list shaping up during rehearsals, Blackmore convinced a friend of his, Derek Lawrence, to be the band's producer. They had met years before, when both worked for producer Joe Meek and Lawrence ran an independent production company that recorded singles for release in the United States. Lawrence had many contacts in the US and was present at some of Roundabout's sessions, remaining impressed.

Through Lawrence, HEC Enterprises contacted the new American record label Tetragrammaton Records, which was looking for a British band to work with. HEC arranged for the band to cut some demos for the American label in late March and early April at Trident Studios in London. They taped two of their previously developed songs, "Hush" and "Help!", as well as two new songs: "Love Help Me" had already been developed before Evans and Paice joined, while "Shadows" was quickly written and arranged by the band for those recording sessions. Lawrence also played the demo of "Help!" to the British recording company EMI, which offered a deal for distribution in Europe with its sub-label Parlophone. All the demos, with the exception of "Shadows", were sent to Tetragrammaton for approval.

The recording of the demos was followed by a short promotional tour of eight dates in Denmark and Sweden through April and May, booked as Roundabout by a friend of Lord. The band name was changed at this time, after Blackmore suggested the title of his grandmother's favourite song, "Deep Purple" by Peter DeRose. Deep Purple played their first gig at the venue of Vestpoppen - a club set up on Parkskolen - a school and youthclub on 76 Parkvej in Taastrup, Denmark on 20 April 1968 and the live set comprised all the new songs and the cover of "Little Girl", originally by John Mayall and Eric Clapton. When they returned to England, Tetragrammaton confirmed the decision to sign the band. This was a saving grace, because HEC had spent nearly all their budget for promotion and equipment. The band relocated to Highleigh Manor, in Balcombe, West Sussex, because Deeves Hall was no longer available.

While the band was on tour, some studio time had been booked and on Saturday, 11 May 1968, Deep Purple went into Pye Studios at ATV House in London. There, with Lawrence producing and Barry Ainsworth acting as engineer, they recorded the recently gigged material using a four-track tape machine. It was custom in those years, especially for debut bands, to have small production budgets, which allowed very limited time in the recording studio. Under these conditions it was difficult to do many overdubs and the songs were recorded live in one or two takes. "And the Address" and "Hey Joe" were cut first, followed by "Hush" and "Help!" later the first day. On Sunday, "Love Help Me", "I'm So Glad" (with a classical music prelude entitled "Happiness") and "Mandrake Root" were recorded. Finally, on Monday, 13 May, "One More Rainy Day" was cut, completing the recording of the album. Sound effects extracted from a BBC album were added as transitions between songs during mixing, which was completed later the same day.

== Release ==
The finished album was taken to Tetragrammaton's representatives in London, who approved its release. After the final approval, the band members were dressed in fashionable costumes at the Mr. Fish Emporium, where they did a photo-shoot. The resulting shots were shipped with the master tapes to America where Tetragrammaton began production and distribution of the album. The cover design by Les Weisbrich allegedly cost half a million dollars.

The single "Hush" was released overseas in June 1968 and it turned out to be a huge success, garnering the band considerable attention and peaking at No. 4 on the US charts and at No. 2 on the Canadian charts. The label's reluctance to release "Help!" as the promotional single and instead go for "Hush", proved ingenious. Widely distributed and hyped, the song was played on radios all over the US, particularly the West Coast, and the band's fame grew considerably. The album was released in the United States in July 1968 and reached No. 24 on the Billboard Pop Chart.

Deep Purple – Hush
"Hush" was chosen as the lead single from the album and was a top 5 hit in the US and Canada.

"Hush" was released in the UK in late July, but it did not attract much interest. In August, an appearance on British TV at the David Frost Show to lip-sync the song was shot with the roadie Mick Angus standing in for an unavailable Blackmore. However, their presence on TV did not help the sales of the single in the UK and made Parlophone postpone the release of the album.

The band recorded some radio sessions for the John Peel's Top Gear radio show on BBC, but otherwise, England in general was not their priority. Those recordings recently resurfaced and are included in the compilation album BBC Sessions 1968–1970. Shades of Deep Purple was finally released in the United Kingdom with much simpler cover art in September 1968 and went almost unnoticed there. Jon Lord, in an interview with the magazine Beat Instrumental, reflected on the scarce receptivity of England to his group and on how lucky the band was to be signed to an American label that gave Deep Purple "far greater freedom both financially and artistically" than they "could ever have got with a British company", which "as a rule won't spend any time or effort with you until you're an established name".

A monaural pressing of the album was released in the UK and Europe, which was simply a fold-down of the stereo mix.

Shades of Deep Purple was reissued many times all over the world, often in a set with the two following albums recorded by the Mk. I line-up. Besides the original issues, the most significant version of the album is the Remastered CD edition released in 2000 by EMI, which contains as bonus tracks previously unreleased recordings from the first demos in April 1968 and from TV show appearances. All the songs were digitally remastered and restored by Peter Mew at Abbey Road Studios in London. In 2004, several tracks were remixed from the 4-track masters, cutting off the sound effects used as transitions in the original edition. These were released on a CD called "The Early Years".

== Musical style ==
Deep Purple's members were experienced musicians with different musical backgrounds: Lord had trained in classical music and had played in jazz and blues rock ensembles, Blackmore and Simper came from session work in pop rock, Paice and Evans from beat bands. However, no one was an accomplished songwriter. The only one with experience in musical composition was Lord, who wrote the arrangements and the bulk of the music for the first album, with some guitar riffs added by Blackmore. The album shows the potential of the band but does not focus on a distinct sound. Identifiable on the album are the musical styles which were developing in the UK in that period and that influenced the young musicians in Deep Purple, a mix of psychedelic rock, progressive rock, pop rock and hard rock. The latter is most evident in Blackmore's guitar parts.

Traces of the heavy sound that would mark the production of Deep Purple's "Mk. II" line-up (when Evans and Simper were replaced by Gillan and Roger Glover) can already be heard in the opening instrumental "And the Address" and in "Mandrake Root". The main riff of the latter is very similar to the one in the song "Foxy Lady", a testimony of Blackmore's admiration for Jimi Hendrix. The other original compositions, the ballad "One More Rainy Day" and "Love Help Me", are pop rock songs that enhance the commercial appeal of the album, but are considered by critics less interesting than the cover songs.

We loved Vanilla Fudge – they were our heroes.

— Ritchie Blackmore

The use of so many cover songs to fill up the album was a common feature at the time, because of the short time given to bands for songwriting and for the rushed schedules of production. The songs covered in the album were all treated with new arrangements to be considerably longer and sound more grandiose than the originals, in an attempt to emulate the American rock band Vanilla Fudge, which many Deep Purple members admired. "Hush" and "Help!" are clear examples of the "Vanilla Fudge style of slowing a song down and bluesing it up" to get a more psychedelic sound. The sound of the band was also heavily influenced by classical music: "I'm So Glad" is introduced by "Prelude: Happiness", featuring an electric arrangement inspired by the first movement of Nikolai Rimsky-Korsakov's symphonic suite Scheherazade; the cover of "Hey Joe" was arranged inserting parts taken from the Miller's Dance, suite no. 2, part 2 of El sombrero de tres picos ballet by Manuel de Falla, on a rhythm reminiscent of the Boléro by Maurice Ravel.

== Touring ==
Deep Purple's live shows were from the start very loud and hard rocking and their stage set included stacks of custom purple vinyl Marshall amps and fancy dresses. The dualism between Blackmore's flamboyant guitar playing, which he had honed in many years of daily practice and experimented on tour with Sutch, and Lord's rocking Hammond solos was still in an embryonic stage, but it would soon become an integral part of the band's dynamics.

Deep Purple debuted at The Roundhouse Theatre in London on 6 July 1968, opening for The Byrds, before The Gun and The Deviants. Their performance was badly received by the audience and by other attending musicians, including Mick Jagger. In spite of this, the band went on playing their live set in local pubs and festivals, but were received coldly and ignored by the press. In an interview with Melody Maker, Ian Paice explained that their lack of touring and promotion in England was due to the low wages they were offered and to the fact that they had very few danceable numbers to attract audience. He stressed that "we make a point of warning promoters that we are not a dancing group."

Waiting to start their first US tour and in need of new material to be offered on the American market and to beef up their live show, the band returned to the studio with producer Derek Lawrence to record their second album, The Book of Taliesyn, in August 1968. The new album was recorded before the release of Shades of Deep Purple in the UK.

By October, Deep Purple set off to the States to start their US tour. The success of "Hush" was a giant boost in America and from their first gigs they received all the attention they had not been given in England. The first dates were at The Inglewood Forum on 18 and 19 October 1968, supporting Cream in their farewell tour. A recording of those live performances was released in 2002 with the title Inglewood – Live in California. The band played at many different locations, including festivals and bars, and made several TV appearances, including Playboy After Dark and even The Dating Game where, in addition to the band performing, Jon Lord appeared as a contestant. While the Playboy After Dark episode has survived in the archives, the Dating Game episode is now lost.

The songs of this album were performed regularly by the Mk. I formation of Deep Purple, but only "Hush", "Help!" and "Hey Joe" found space for a limited time in the live shows of the Mk. II line-up in 1969. However, "Mandrake Root", in an expanded and mainly instrumental version, was a staple in Mk. II live shows up until 1972, and the instrumental sections of the song survived even longer, being annexed to live versions of the Machine Head recording "Space Truckin'". The opening chords of "And the Address" were used into the Mk. II era as an introduction to the song "Speed King". "Hush" was re-recorded in 1988 and is still an integral part of the live set of the current formation of the band.

== Critical reception ==
Professional ratings
Review scores
Source	Rating
AllMusic	4/5 stars
PopMatters	6/10
Collector's Guide to Heavy Metal	6/10

Reception of the album and the band in their home country was generally negative. Despite being presented as a "polished commercial group" in their radio appearances, Deep Purple's stage excesses and success in the US did not make a good impression on British audiences. The Deviants frontman and later journalist Mick Farren described Deep Purple's music as "a slow and pompous din, somewhere between bad Tchaikovsky and a B-52 taking off on a bombing run". They were also criticised for being too American and the "poor man's Vanilla Fudge". As Brian Connolly of Sweet recalled, "they were so out of place that you really felt sorry for them."

By contrast, in the US the band was often introduced as "the English Vanilla Fudge" and massive radio coverage of their songs granted success for both the album and tour. Ian Paice said of their success in the US versus their lack of it back home, "We have been given proper exposure over there. The Americans really know how to push records."

Decades later, modern critical reviews of the album are generally positive. Bruce Eder of AllMusic considers Shades of Deep Purple, despite some flaws, "a hell of an album" and praises the "infectious ... spirit of fun" of the disc, which has "much more of a '60s feel than we're accustomed to hearing from this band". Blogcritics contributor David Bowling states that Shades of Deep Purple "was a creative and very good debut album", which combines "psychedelic music with hard rock and early progressive rock into a pleasant but disjointed whole". PopMatters review of the three albums of the Mk. I line-up considers them "both respectable and consistent", although Evans' voice is "perhaps more suited to heavy pop rather than heavy rock". Canadian journalist Martin Popoff described this early incarnation of Deep Purple as a "hard psych band", more committed to the music than other contemporaries and already capable of creating "a noise that definitetly foretold of things to come."

In an Observer Music Monthly Greatest British Albums poll, keyboard player Rick Wakeman chose Shades of Deep Purple as his favourite British record of all time.

== Track listing ==
All credits adapted from the original releases.

Side one
No.	Title	Writer(s)	Length
1.	"And the Address" (instrumental)	Ritchie Blackmore, Jon Lord	4:38
2.	"Hush"	Joe South	4:24
3.	"One More Rainy Day"	Lord, Rod Evans	3:40
4.	"Prelude: Happiness"/"I'm So Glad"	Blackmore, Evans, Lord, Ian Paice, Nick Simper/Skip James	7:19

Side two
No.	Title	Writer(s)	Length
5.	"Mandrake Root"	Blackmore, Evans, Lord	6:09
6.	"Help!"	Lennon–McCartney	6:01
7.	"Love Help Me"	Blackmore, Evans	3:49
8.	"Hey Joe"	Billy Roberts	7:33

Remastered CD edition bonus tracks
No.	Title	Writer(s)	Length
9.	"Shadows" (album outtake)	Lord, Evans, Simper, Blackmore	3:39
10.	"Love Help Me" (instrumental version)	Blackmore, Evans	3:30
11.	"Help" (alternate take)	Lennon–McCartney	5:24
12.	"Hey Joe" (BBC Top Gear session, 14 January 1969)	Roberts	4:06
13.	"Hush" (live US TV, 1968)	South	3:53

== Personnel ==
=== Deep Purple ===
- Rod Evans – lead vocals
- Ritchie Blackmore – guitar
- Nick Simper – bass guitar, backing vocals
- Jon Lord – organ, backing vocals
- Ian Paice – drums

=== Production ===
- Derek Lawrence – production, mixing
- Barry Ainsworth – engineering
- Les Weisbrich – graphic design
- Peter Mew – restoring and remastering at Abbey Road Studios, London (2000)

== Charts ==
=== Album ===
Chart performance for Shades of Deep Purple
Chart (1968)	Peak position
Canada Top Albums/CDs (RPM)	19
US Billboard 200	24

=== Singles ===
"Hush"

Chart (1968)	Peak position
Australian Singles (Kent Music Report)	27
Canada Top Singles (RPM)	2
Switzerland (Schweizer Hitparade)	7
US Billboard Hot 100	4

== Release history ==
Release history and formats for Shades of Deep Purple
Date	Label	Format	Country	Catalog	Notes
17 July 1968	Tetragrammaton	LP	US	T 102	Original stereo release.
September 1968	Parlophone	LP	UK	PMC 7055	Original mono release.
September 1968	Parlophone	LP	UK	PCS 7055	Original stereo release.
1969	Parlophone	LP	UK	PCS 7055	
1970	Parlophone	LP	UK	PCS 7055. Repress of UK LP.	
1977	Harvest	LP	UK	SHSM 2016	Reissue with alternative cover
1977	Warner Bros.	LP	Japan	P-10332-W	Reissue
November 1987	Harvest	LP	UK	SHSM 2016/OC 054-04 175	Reissue with alternative cover
1988	Passport	CD, Cassette	US	SHSM 2016/OC 054-04 175	First US CD release. Pulled from vinyl LP with EQ added.
1988	Passport	LP	US	PB3606	
1989	Parlophone	CD	UK	CDP 7 92407 2. Original UK release. UK master was used with vinyl-sourced fixes.	
1990	Creative Sounds	CD	US	CSL 6021. Repress of the US Passport CD.	
1991	Warner Bros.	CD	Japan	CSL 6021. Made from Japanese copy of US master.	
1996	Creative Sounds, Power Sound 2001	CD	US	PSSR 6021-2/6021-2. Another repressing of the Passport CD.	
10 October 1996	Warner Bros.	CD	Japan	WPCR-861	
1997	Parlophone	LP	UK	7243 8 21453 1 8	
24 June 1998	Deep Purple Overseas	CD	Japan	TECW-21717	
21 August 1999	Deep Purple Overseas	CD	Japan	TECW-21864	
2000	Eagle Records	CD	US	ER202242	Reissue with the original US cover and five bonus tracks. Remastered from the original master by Peter Mew with added noise reduction.
2000	Spitfire Records	CD	US	SPT-CD-15062	US release of Eagle Records edition. Reissue with the original US cover and five bonus tracks. Remastered from the original master by Peter Mew with added noise reduction.
2000	EMI	CD	UK & Europe	7243 4 98336 2 3	Reissue with the original UK cover and five bonus tracks. Remastered from the original master by Peter Mew with added noise reduction.
21 March 2003	Purple, Vap	CD	Japan	VPCK-85320	
14 February 2006	Tetragrammaton	LP	US	T-102 - Pirate edition of US release.	
2007	Tetragrammaton	LP	US	T-102 - Another Pirate edition of the US release.	
23 July 2008	Victor	CD	Japan	VICP-64302	
14 December 2011	Victor	CD	Japan	VICP-75020	
19 February 2014	Victor	CD	Japan	VICP-75126	Reissue of the original mono release.
19 April 2014	Parlophone	CD	UK	PMCR 7055	Reissue of the original mono release.
2014	Parlophone	CD	Europe	PMCR 7055	Reissue of the original mono release.
8 June 2015	Parlophone	LP	UK & Europe	PCSR 7055	Reissue of the original stereo release.
