= Inglewood – Live in California =

Live album by Deep Purple
- Released: 2002
- Recorded: 18 October 1968
- Venues: The Forum, Los Angeles, California
- Genre: Hard rock
- Length: 48:00
- Label: Purple

Deep Purple live albums chronology
Live in Paris 1975 (2001)	Inglewood – Live in California (2002)	Space Vol 1 & 2 (2004)

Inglewood: Live in California is a live album by Deep Purple. It was recorded in Los Angeles on 18 October 1968, as the supporting band for Cream, at their Farewell Tour. One of the very few live recordings featuring the Mark I lineup, it was finally released in 2002 on Purple Records.

== Notes on the source recording ==
The source of this recording is the mono audio track of a primitive open-reel video recording made by Purple's US label at the time, Tetragrammaton Records. The video recording was made from the audience with a (then) state-of-the-art Sony 1/2 inch reel-to-reel videotape recorder and portable camera, with an open air microphone to capture the sound. The black and white picture quality of the video was poor, but the audio was quite acceptable. When Warner Bros. Records took over Tetragrammaton's roster in 1970, the original half-inch video tape reel was discarded. It was rescued and after many years, was acquired by the fan organization The Deep Purple Appreciation Society. The audio portion was transferred and remastered for this CD release.

== Track listing ==
No.	Title	Writer(s)	Length
1.	"Hush"	Joe South	4:44
2.	"Kentucky Woman"	Neil Diamond	5:01
3.	"Mandrake Root"	Rod Evans, Ritchie Blackmore, Jon Lord	10:10
4.	"Help"	Lennon–McCartney	6:19
5.	"Wring That Neck"	Blackmore, Nick Simper, Lord, Ian Paice	6:40
6.	"River Deep, Mountain High"	Phil Spector, Jeff Barry, Ellie Greenwich	9:44
7.	"Hey Joe"	Billy Roberts	7:57

== Personnel ==
- Ritchie Blackmore – guitars
- Rod Evans – lead vocals
- Jon Lord – keyboards, backing vocals
- Ian Paice – drums, percussion
- Nick Simper – bass guitar, backing vocals
