= The Book of Taliesyn =

1968 studio album by Deep Purple

- Cover art by John Vernon Lord

Studio album by Deep Purple
- Released: December 1968
- Recorded: 1 August - 10 October 1968
- Studios: De Lane Lea, Kingsway, London
- Genres: Psychedelic rock; progressive rock; hard rock
- Length: 43:57
- Labels: Tetragrammaton (US); Harvest (UK)
- Producer: Derek Lawrence

Deep Purple chronology
Shades of Deep Purple (1968)	The Book of Taliesyn (1968)	Deep Purple (1969)

Singles from The Book of Taliesyn
- 1. "Kentucky Woman" Released: October 1968; 2. "River Deep – Mountain High" Released: January 1969

Remastered re-issue cover

The Book of Taliesyn is the second studio album by the English rock band Deep Purple, recorded only three months after Shades of Deep Purple and released by Tetragrammaton Records in December 1968, during their first US tour. The name for the album was taken from the 14th-century Book of Taliesin.

The structure of the album is similar to that of their first, with four original songs and three rearranged covers; however, the tracks are longer, the arrangements more complex and the sound more polished than on Shades of Deep Purple. The music style is a mix of psychedelic rock, progressive rock and hard rock, with several inserts of classical music arranged by the band's keyboard player Jon Lord.

Deep Purple's American record label aimed for a hippie audience, which was very influential in the US at the time, but the chart results of the album and singles were not as high as expected. This setback did not hinder the success of the three-month US tour, when the band played in many important venues and festivals and received positive feedback from audiences and the press. Deep Purple were still an underground band which played in small clubs and colleges in the United Kingdom, largely ignored by the media and the public. The British record company EMI did not release The Book of Taliesyn until June 1969, on the new underground prog rock sub-label Harvest Records, and the album did not chart. Even the release of the new single "Emmaretta" and new dates in the UK in summer 1969 did not increase album sales or the popularity of Deep Purple in the UK. Perception of the album has changed in later years and it has been reviewed more favourably.

== Background ==
My main complaint about Deep Purple is that when we did get some success, which was very, very quickly after we started, we were just worked to death by the management and the record company.

— Nick Simper (1998)

Deep Purple were booked for a long tour in the United States, starting in October 1968, as a result of the unexpected success in the US and Canada of their first album Shades of Deep Purple, fronted by the hit single "Hush". The single, released in June, had reached No. 4 in the US Singles Chart and No. 2 in Canada and was the main reason for their sudden popularity overseas. The situation was quite the opposite at home, where the band had been heavily criticized by the media and audiences.

In July, band and crew relocated from West Sussex to London. Their management rented a house at 13 Second Avenue, Acton Vale, which was used as living quarters and to prepare for the upcoming US tour when they were not away for gigs or promotion. Guitarist Ritchie Blackmore went to live there with his German fiancée Babs Hardie.

Executives at Tetragrammaton Records, Deep Purple's American label, thought it would be more profitable to have a new album to promote during the US tour, besides the already successful Shades of Deep Purple. Moreover, the eight tracks recorded in May for Deep Purple's debut album and performed live in the British gigs of July and August were deemed insufficient for their shows as headliners in the US. For these reasons, they were pushed back into the studio just a couple of months before the tour began, even though their debut album had not been released in the United Kingdom yet.

== Composition and recording ==
The request of the record label to record a new album only three months after their debut found the band unprepared, because the intense activity after the release of Shades of Deep Purple had left very little time for writing and rehearsing new songs. Under pressure, the musicians eventually came up with four lengthy original compositions, but to fill up the new album they reworked and expanded three cover songs, following again the example of the American band Vanilla Fudge, which many band members admired. The first was "Kentucky Woman", a hit single for Neil Diamond in 1967 which Deep Purple performed live at a BBC session in August. Though the song was written by Diamond, Deep Purple's version musically leans toward the style of Mitch Ryder's recording of "Devil with a Blue Dress On". The second cover was "River Deep – Mountain High", a single released by Ike & Tina Turner in 1966. Finally, the 1965 Beatles song "We Can Work It Out" was chosen after Paul McCartney himself had reportedly expressed appreciation for Deep Purple's version of "Help!"

On the first of August 1968, Deep Purple entered De Lane Lea Studios in Kingsway, London, with producer Derek Lawrence and sound engineer Brian Aintsworth, who had both worked on their previous album. Tetragrammaton's advance of $250,000 had been used to book two weeks in the studio, a time which covered songwriting, rehearsals and recording sessions. Time was granted in larger amount than for the making of Shades of Deep Purple in May, feeding the band's ambition of coming up with better original material than their previous effort.

Deep Purple recorded "Shield" and "Anthem" on the first day. On the first song Ian Paice plays a complex drum pattern which sounds like a repeated clash of glass objects, while the second one required a string quartet for the baroque style interlude in the middle. The following days they proceeded with the composition and recording of "Exposition/We Can Work It Out" and of the original track "Listen, Learn, Read On" (a song that mentions the album title "The Book of Taliesyn" in the lyrics). On 19 August, they concluded these sessions with the recording of "Kentucky Woman" and of the heavy and up-tempo instrumental "Wring That Neck", which came out from a tight collaboration between Blackmore and bass player Nick Simper. The name "Wring That Neck" comes from a phrase the band used when they were playing live, describing the bassist or guitarist really bursting at their instruments to create a hard noise (i.e., squeezing, or "wringing", the neck of the guitar). Another instrumental called "Playground" was written and recorded on 18 August, but the lyrics were never completed and it was eventually discarded. "River Deep - Mountain High" was always intended as the final track, so its recording was postponed until the other tracks were finished. The musicians’ perfectionism required extra time to complete the track and it was taped only on 10 October, a long time after the planned deadline for studio recording.

The mixing was supposed to be overseen by the band members, but their schedule in October was so tight that Lawrence did it without them. This dismayed the band at first, but the sound turned out cleaner, heavier and more polished than on their debut. The tapes were mixed in both mono and stereo, but the mono tapes were trashed, as neither Tetragrammaton nor EMI, Deep Purple's British label, had any use for them.

== Release ==
Original French "River Deep, Mountain High" single cover from 1969

The album was released in the United States in December 1968, during the American tour. The American label insisted on changing the title of the instrumental "Wring That Neck", considered too violent, to "Hard Road". The track was used as the B-side of the single "Kentucky Woman", issued in October 1968. The Book of Taliesyn reached No. 54 in the US chart and No. 48 in the Canadian chart. The single peaked at No. 38 in the US and received much airplay, but did not replicate the success of "Hush".

We were big business in America, EMI did nothing; they were stupid old guys.

— Nick Simper

In an attempt to improve sales of the album, a shorter and heavily edited version of "River Deep - Mountain High" was released as a single exclusively in the United States and Canada in January 1969, with "Listen, Learn, Read On" as the B-side. It reached No. 53 and No. 42, respectively, in the two countries and was not a success, charting lower than "Kentucky Woman". The album was distributed in Canada (in 1968) and Japan (in June 1969) by Polydor Records.

EMI delayed the release of the album in the UK to June 1969, after the band had come back from the US and set up a proper tour of their home country. By that time, the band had already recorded and released their third album Deep Purple in the US, and recorded a single with a new line-up. The Book of Taliesyn was the first release by Harvest Records, a new sub-label which EMI executives had devised as an outlet for British underground progressive rock groups. "Kentucky Woman", with "Wring That Neck" as B-side, was the only single released in the UK in December 1968, but it was retired after only six weeks. Just as had happened with Shades of Deep Purple the year before, both album and single received little promotion and were widely overlooked, selling much less in the UK than overseas.

The Book of Taliesyn was reissued many times all over the world, often in a set with the two other albums recorded by the Mk. I line-up. Besides the original issues, the most significant version of the album is the Remastered CD edition of 2000 by EMI, which contains previously unreleased recordings taken from the sessions of August and December 1968 and from TV shows appearances as bonus tracks. All the songs were digitally remastered by Peter Mew at Abbey Road Studios in London. Other notable re-releases of the album include a white vinyl collector's edition issued in 2015 for a Record Store Day.

== Musical style ==
The musical style of The Book of Taliesyn is a mix of progressive rock, psychedelic rock and hard rock and different observers think that in this album the band is more mature and in greater control of its own means of expression. Critics highlight how the compositions are generally longer and more complex than in their debut album. Deep Purple biographer Dave Thompson writes that a dark mood permeates The Book of Taliesyn with little indulgence to pop rock, citing influences of the American band the Doors in the original tracks written for this album.

Deep Purple – Kentucky Woman
The cover of Neil Diamond's "Kentucky Woman" was the first song taken from the album and issued as a single. It was arranged with the sound of American rocker Mitch Ryder in mind.

The influence of keyboard player Jon Lord's classical music upbringing is felt strongly in all the tracks, but this time he was not the main person responsible for songwriting and arrangements, which are considered by critics Deep Purple's first real group effort. Lord's interest in mixing rock and classical music would culminate in late 1969 with his Concerto for Group and Orchestra suite, but he already defined Deep Purple as a symphonic rock band in a 1968 interview. Nick Simper complained about Lord's excessive influence in composition and arrangements in a 1983 interview, which he said "resulted in a lack of direction for the band." "Anthem" is perhaps the band's deepest venture into classical music on a regular studio album, with its baroque-style interlude reminiscent of a Bach fugue written by Lord and performed using Mellotron and string quartet. A similar approach can be found on King Crimson's debut album, released a year later. Rearranged excerpts from the second movement of Beethoven's Symphony No. 7 and Tchaikovsky's Ouverture-Fantasy "Romeo and Juliet" are in the instrumental intro "Exposition", while "River Deep, Mountain High" is introduced by the notes of "Also sprach Zarathustra", written in 1896 by Richard Strauss and very popular after its inclusion in the film 2001: A Space Odyssey, screened earlier in 1968.

"Wring that Neck" and "Kentucky Woman" show more traces of the heavier music that the band would embrace in their 70s albums with the Mk.II line-up. Blackmore's guitar work is generally praised by critics. However, in a recent interview, the guitarist defined the album as "lame" and remembered that he had not yet found his own style of guitar playing at the time of recording.

The lyrics written by the band's singer Rod Evans are very functional to the music and the marketing Deep Purple's record label was building up for the American hippie audience. Evans took inspiration for the fantasy-themed "Listen, Learn, Read On", which contains lyrical reference to the album's title, from the 14th-century Welsh manuscript Book of Taliesin, a collection of poems attributed to the 6th-century poet Taliesin. The title and cover art of the album were also inspired by the manuscript. Instead psychedelia and its rituals play a large part in the lyrics of "Shield". Simper thinks that Evans' lyrics are "far better than anything ... has ever been written in other line ups, in Deep Purple."

== Cover art ==
Cover art and sleeve notes convey Tetragrammaton's decision to aim the album at the vast American hippie audience, which was very influential in the US at the time. The notes in particular were written in a mystical tone, evoking the bard Taliesyn as a spiritual guide and comparing listening to the songs to an exploration in the band members' souls. The original cover was drawn in pen, ink and color by the British illustrator and author John Vernon Lord, who coincidentally appears to share the same name as Deep Purple's keyboard player. The Book of Taliesyn was the only record cover John Vernon Lord ever designed and, according to the artist's recent retrospective book Drawing upon Drawing, the original artwork was never returned. In his book, John Vernon Lord remembers the assignment received from his agency Saxon Artists:

The agent gave me the title saying that the art director wanted a 'fantasy Arthurian touch' and to include hand lettering for the title and the musicians' names. I mainly drew from The Book of Taliesin, which is a collection of poems, said to be written by the sixth century Welsh bard Taliesin.

The fee for the job was £30, minus 25% for the agent. John Vernon Lord was, until 1999, Professor of Illustration at the University of Brighton.

== Touring ==
Deep Purple arrived in California on 15 October 1968 and their first public appearance on American soil was at The Dating Game TV show on ABC on 17 October. They were the first rock band to perform on the show, where Jon Lord was one of the contestants. The next two days the band played live in the US for the first time as supporting act of Cream in their Goodbye tour. The concerts were held at the Inglewood Forum near Los Angeles, California, in front of more than 16,000 people each night. Recordings of those live shows were issued in 2002 as Inglewood – Live in California. The next gig at San Diego was the last one supporting Cream, whose management apparently did not appreciate the cheerful reaction of the audience to Deep Purple and dropped them. After a resulting week of inactivity, their American manager succeeded in setting up a tour which included the San Francisco International Pop Festival and venues on the West Coast. This opportunity was very useful for the young musicians, who as headliners could lengthen their live shows up to 90 minutes and gained much needed experience on the road. This was particularly true for Blackmore, who developed and extended his guitar solos, incorporating more improvisations.

The tour was a success and Deep Purple's popularity in the US received another boost from a TV appearance at Playboy After Dark alongside Hugh Hefner on 23 October 1968. The band had become a much requested act and more dates were added on the East Coast till the end of the year, including a two nights gig at the Fillmore East with Creedence Clearwater Revival and the James Cotton Blues Band, and Christmas holiday shows at the famous Electric Circus club in New York.

In late December, the band managers Tony Edwards and John Coletta booked some studio time in New York to record a new single, after the relative failure of "Kentucky Woman" and "River Deep, Mountain High". The band recorded a cover of Mike Condello's song "Oh No" and tried "Lay Lady Lay" by Bob Dylan and "Glory Road" by Neil Diamond, without satisfying results. The record label did not publish those recordings, but a surviving take of "Oh No" sourced from Nick Simper's own acetate can be heard on the 2000 remastered edition of The Book of Taliesyn. The track on the remaster is titled "Oh No No No", but Ben E. King is misattributed as the original artist while "Russell/Leander" are mistakenly credited for songwriting.

The band returned in England on 3 January 1969 and went straight into De Lane Lea Studios to record new songs. The recording sessions were interspersed with gigs and lasted from January to March; most of the songs ended up in their eponymous album, which would be released by Tetragrammaton in the US only in June 1969.

Deep Purple debuted the new single "Emmaretta", new material and new takes on songs from their released albums at BBC sessions for the Top Gear radio show on 14 January. The song "Hey Bop a Re Bop" played at those sessions would later become "The Painter". Starting on the first of February the band went on tour in Denmark and the UK, with gigs in colleges and small clubs. In an interview, the band commented that in comparison with what they earned in America "they were actually losing a couple of thousand pounds every night they played in Britain." The last UK gig was on 22 March and on 1 April 1969 the band was again on tour in the US, despite the lack of a new album to promote. It was at this time that Blackmore and Lord decided to change Deep Purple's musical style, veering towards straight hard rock, which led to Evans and Simper's dismissal in July.

When The Book of Taliesyn was finally released in the UK in June 1969 a few more dates in the band's home country were added to promote the album release, even if the Mk.II line-up with new members Ian Gillan and Roger Glover was already rehearsing and recording new material in secret.

Songs from this album were performed regularly by the Mk. I line-up. The exceptions were "Exposition/We Can Work It Out" and "Anthem", whose complex arrangements could not be easily reproduced in a live setting. The Mk. II formation performed "Kentucky Woman" in their first shows, but dropped it from the set list together with the few other songs from the first three albums, in favour of new material. Only the instrumental "Wring That Neck" remained a staple of Deep Purple's performances for a couple of years, working as a frame for Blackmore and Lord's long improvisations and coming back in the set list of the current line-up in the 2000s.

== Reception ==
Professional ratings
Review scores
Source	Rating
AllMusic	3.5/5 stars
PopMatters	6/10
Collector's Guide to Heavy Metal	5/10

Deep Purple's albums and singles were almost completely ignored in the UK, a fact that puzzled American reporters. In an interview, Simper tried to explain their lack of success in their home country, saying that the British audience was more interested in a fancy presentation than music and that blues rock "was becoming very big" at the time in England. John Peel, head of the Top Gear radio show, who had met the band in 1968 and had great expectations for The Book of Taliesyn, was not too pleased with the final result:

The group have done some fine things for Radio One and they excite when they play live. I don't understand where this record went wrong, it is all too restrained somehow. They recorded "Wring That Neck" much better for a recent Top Gear.

American reviewers were enthusiastic about Deep Purple's live performances and the lack of a new successful single apparently did not ruin the positive perception of the band in the US, to the point that they were often addressed as an American band. Band members even thought about transferring their residence to the United States, but abandoned the idea when they learned that the 21-year-old Paice could be drafted for the Vietnam War.

Modern reviews of the album go from positive to mixed. Joe Viglione of AllMusic compares Deep Purple's production to Vanilla Fudge's, underlining how the two bands covered songs from the same authors and used similar arrangements. He writes that on The Book of Taliesyn Deep Purple veered more towards progressive rock than their American counterparts, combining meaningful lyrics and "innovative musical passages". On the contrary, PopMatters criticizes the "Spinal Tapish" lyrics and the lack of hit material on the album with the exception of "Wring That Neck", considered "perhaps the first real Deep Purple composition." Blogcritics reviewers stress how the original material, and "Wring That Neck" in particular, "stands the test of time well". However, Greg Barbrick finds "Jon Lord’s classical leanings (...) a bit too much" on tracks like "Exposition" and "Anthem", where they "threaten to derail the proceedings". Canadian journalist Martin Popoff in his Collector's Guide to Heavy Metal described the album's sound as a mix of hard rock and psychedelic rock usually associated with bands such as Mad River and The 13th Floor Elevators. He found The Book of Taliesyn very similar in structure and just "a bit darker, more bombastic and theatrical" than its predecessor, and considered the song "Shield" a "buried gem".

== Track listing ==
All credits adapted from the original releases.

Side one
No.	Title	Writer(s)	Length
1.	"Listen, Learn, Read On"	Ritchie Blackmore, Jon Lord, Rod Evans, Ian Paice	4:05
2.	"Wring That Neck" (instrumental; titled "Hard Road" in the USA)	Blackmore, Lord, Nick Simper, Paice	5:13
3.	"Kentucky Woman" (Neil Diamond cover)	Neil Diamond	4:44
4.	": Exposition"/"We Can Work It Out; " (The Beatles cover)	Blackmore, Lord, Simper, Paice; Lennon–McCartney	7:06

Side two
No.	Title	Writer(s)	Length
5.	"Shield"	Lord, Blackmore, Evans	6:06
6.	"Anthem"	Lord, Evans	6:31
7.	"River Deep, Mountain High" (Ike & Tina Turner cover)	Jeff Barry, Ellie Greenwich, Phil Spector	10:12

Remastered CD edition bonus tracks
No.	Title	Writer(s)	Length
8.	"Oh No No No" (studio outtake, original title "Oh No", December 1968)	Mike Condello	4:25
9.	"It's All Over" (BBC Top Gear session; 14 January 1969)	Bert Berns (aka Bert Russell), Mike Leander	4:14
10.	"Hey Bop a Re Bop" (BBC Top Gear session; 14 January 1969)	Blackmore, Evans, Lord, Paice	3:31
11.	"Wring That Neck" (BBC Top Gear session; 14 January 1969)	Blackmore, Simper, Lord, Paice	4:42
12.	"Playground" (remixed instrumental studio outtake; 18 August 1968)	Blackmore, Simper, Lord, Paice	4:29

== Personnel ==
=== Deep Purple ===
- Rod Evans – lead vocals
- Ritchie Blackmore – guitars
- Jon Lord – Hammond organ, backing vocals, string arrangement on "Anthem"
- Nick Simper – bass guitar, backing vocals
- Ian Paice – drums, temple blocks

=== Production ===
- Derek Lawrence – producer, mixing
- Barry Ainsworth – engineer
- Peter Mew – restoring and remastering at Abbey Road Studios, London (2000)

== Charts ==
Album

Chart (1969)	Peak position
Canada Top Albums/CDs (RPM)	48
US Billboard 200	54

Singles

Kentucky Woman

Chart (1969)	Peak position
Canada Top Singles (RPM)	21
US Billboard Hot 100	38

River Deep, Mountain High

Chart (1969)	Peak position
Canada Top Singles (RPM)	42
US Billboard Hot 100	53
