= Hush (Billy Joe Royal song) =

1967 single by Billy Joe Royal

- Cover of the 1967 Norway single

Single by Billy Joe Royal

from the album Billy Joe Royal featuring Hush
- B-side: "Watching from the Bandstand"
- Released: September 1967
- Recorded: 12 July 1967
- Genre: Swamp rock
- Length: 2:30
- Label: Columbia
- Songwriter: Joe South
- Producer: Joe South

Billy Joe Royal singles chronology
"These Are Not My People" (1967)	"Hush" (1967)	"Storybook Children" (1968)

"Hush" is a song written by American songwriter and pop musician Joe South, for singer Billy Joe Royal. The song was a #14 hit by Somebody's Image (an Australian band fronted by Russell Morris) in 1967; Morris re-released a new recording with his band The Rubes in 1980. It was also recorded by Deep Purple in 1968, Blue Swede in 1975, and by Kula Shaker in 1997. These groups each had Hot 100 hits with their versions.

== Billy Joe Royal version ==
Billy Joe Royal recorded "Hush" on 12 July 1967 in Nashville with Barry Bailey, future lead guitarist for the Atlanta Rhythm Section, on guitar. Joe South, Royal's regular songwriter/producer, was travelling to Nashville with Royal and writing "Rose Garden" in the car. Royal didn't like it, so South wrote "Hush" for him while leaning on the dashboard. Royal did record "Rose Garden" for his album Billy Joe Royal featuring Hush, though didn't release it as a single. In 1971, "Rose Garden" become an international hit for Lynn Anderson, and was South's most successful song. Royal later regretted not liking the song.

Although it sold more than Royal's previous six single releases, only two of which had ranked on the Billboard Hot 100, his recording of "Hush" had only limited success. It was a minor hit in most markets, peaking on the Hot 100 at #52, with a Canadian pop chart peak of #45. The qualified success of "Hush" was nevertheless sufficient to allow for the release of Royal's second album Billy Joe Royal featuring Hush.

"Hush" did afford Billy Joe Royal a one-off hit on the European continent, reaching #12 on the German singles chart and becoming a Top Ten hit in Belgium (#1), the Netherlands (#5) and Switzerland (#2).

A promo clip for Billy Joe Royal's release of the song was filmed at the boardwalk amusement park and outskirts of an unidentified Southern beach town.

== Deep Purple version ==
"Hush"
- Cover of the 1968 UK single

Single by Deep Purple

from the album Shades of Deep Purple
- B-side: "One More Rainy Day"
- Released: 21 June 1968 (UK); July 1968 (US)
- Recorded: May 1968
- Studio: Pye, London
- Genre: Psychedelic pop; hard rock; blues rock
- Length: 4:24
- Label: Parlophone (UK); Tetragrammaton (US)
- Songwriter: Joe South
- Producer: Derek Lawrence

Deep Purple singles chronology
"Hush" (1968)	"Kentucky Woman" (1968)

Audio sample
- file; help

"Hush"
- Cover of the 1988 German single

Single by Deep Purple

from the album Nobody's Perfect
- B-side: "Dead or Alive" (live); "Bad Attitude" (live)
- Released: 31 May 1988
- Recorded: 26 February 1988
- Studio: Pye, London
- Genre: Psychedelic pop; hard rock; blues rock
- Length: 3:32
- Label: Polydor (UK); Mercury (US)
- Songwriter: Joe South

Deep Purple singles chronology
"Call of the Wild" (1987)	"Hush" (1988)	"King of Dreams" (1990)

The song was subsequently recorded by English hard rock band Deep Purple, the lead singer of which at the time was Rod Evans, for their 1968 debut album Shades of Deep Purple. Group member Ritchie Blackmore having heard the Billy Joe Royal original while living in Hamburg: "It was a great song [which] would be a good song [for] our act, if we could come up with a different arrangement...We [recorded] the whole song in two takes." The track became the group's first hit single, peaking at number 4 on the Hot 100 on 21–28 September 1968, number 16 in Italy in late 1968, and number 2 in Canada, while going largely unnoticed in the United Kingdom. Cash Box called it a "psychedelicized reversion of the time-back Billy Joe Royal song," saying that the instrumental work and tailoring of the rock song all point to sheer force". Record World described it as "a rollicking, contemporary ditty."

In 1968, Deep Purple performed live on Hugh Hefner's Playboy After Dark TV series. The band opened the episode playing the instrumental "And the Address". After Hefner heard a ghost story from Jon Lord and had a guitar lesson from Ritchie Blackmore, Deep Purple performed "Hush" which is available in the Playboy After Dark -2nd Collection 2007 DVD release and the 2000 CD-reissue of the Shades of Deep Purple album.

In celebration of the band's 20th anniversary, Deep Purple re-recorded the song in 1988 for their album Nobody's Perfect. The track was released as a single and reached number 62 on the UK singles chart and number 44 on the US Hot Mainstream Rock chart. Ian Gillan, who had replaced Rod Evans as lead singer of Deep Purple in 1969, admitted being "uneasy" about having recorded the song, saying that the only person he wanted to hear perform the song was Evans (who at that point was no longer involved in music).

"Hush" is one of five songs originally recorded with the band's original vocalist Rod Evans and bassist Nick Simper that Deep Purple have performed with their replacements Ian Gillan and Roger Glover later on. Others are "Mandrake Root", also from Shades of Deep Purple, "Kentucky Woman", from the album The Book of Taliesyn from 1968 and "Bird Has Flown", from the album Deep Purple from 1969. The instrumental "Wring That Neck" from The Book of Taliesyn was also a regular part of the band's setlist into the early 1970s. The instrumental "And the Address" from the debut album was re-recorded for the 2020 album "Whoosh" with Ian Paice the only musician present on both versions.

=== Personnel ===
1968 Deep Purple version

- Ritchie Blackmore – guitar
- Rod Evans – lead vocals
- Nick Simper – bass guitar, backing vocals
- Ian Paice – drums
- Jon Lord – Hammond organ, backing vocals

1988 Deep Purple version

- Ritchie Blackmore – guitar
- Ian Gillan – vocals, harmonica
- Roger Glover – bass guitar
- Ian Paice – drums
- Jon Lord – organ, keyboards

=== Charts ===
Deep Purple version
Chart (1968)	Peak position
Canada RPM	2
Italy (Musica e dischi)	13
New Zealand (Listener)	6
Switzerland (Swiss Hitparade)	7
US Billboard Hot 100	4

== Other versions ==
- The song's composer Joe South recorded "Hush" in 1968 for his second album Games People Play.
- British singer Kris Ife released a version in December 1967 (MGM Records single)
- Tommy Körberg recorded "Hush" for his 1968 album Nature Boy, credited to Tom.
- Merrilee Rush recorded "Hush" for her 1968 album Angel of the Morning.
- Love Affair recorded "Hush" for their 1968 album The Everlasting Love Affair.
- A 1973 single release of "Hush" by Jeannie C. Riley, from her album Just Jeannie, reached #51 on the Billboard C&W chart.
- For his 1987 album Ringolevio, Little Bob recorded a modernized and dynamited version "Hush".
- Swiss band Gotthard included a cover on their self-titled 1992 debut album. They also performed the song live with Deep Purple's Jon Lord as guest special at the Zermatt Unplugged Festival in 2008.
- Jenny Rock, a Canadian artist, recorded a French adaptation version in 1970 entitled Mal (produced by Michel Pagliaro).
- Kula Shaker recorded a version which peaked at #2 in the UK Charts in 1997 and was used on the soundtrack for I Know What You Did Last Summer and the marketing for Kingsman: The Secret Service.
- The Partridge Family performed a version on their TV series, with David Cassidy on vocals.
- Milli Vanilli recorded a version on their debut album All or Nothing in 1988.
- Complex recorded a version for their debut self-titled studio album in 1970.
- Funky Junction recorded a version of "Hush" on their only album Funky Junction Play a Tribute to Deep Purple in 1973. The band featured Phil Lynott, Eric Bell, and Brian Downey from Thin Lizzy.
- Captain Jack covered "Hush" on the Eurodance album Party Warriors, released in Europe in 2003.
- Johnny Hallyday recorded a version "Mal" in 1968 which appeared on several b-singles through Europe. It also appeared on the album "Jeune Hommes"
