= Live in Paris 1975 =

2001 live album by Deep Purple

Live album by Deep Purple
- Released: 5 April 2001
- Recorded: at Palais des Sports, Paris, 7 April 1975
- Genre: Hard rock, heavy metal
- Length: 107:30
- Label: Purple
- Producer: Deep Purple

Deep Purple live albums chronology
The Soundboard Series (2001)	Live in Paris 1975 (2001)	Inglewood – Live in California (2001)

Professional ratings
Review scores
Source	Rating
Deep Purple Appreciation Society	link
Allmusic	link
Sputnikmusic	4.0/5 stars

Live in Paris 1975 is a live album by the English hard rock band Deep Purple, recorded in 1975 at the Palais des Sports in Paris. It was meant to be released before the 1975 Come Taste the Band album, but was not released until 2001 by Purple Records.

In early 1975, the guitarist Ritchie Blackmore recorded his first album, Ritchie Blackmore's Rainbow with Rainbow and decided to leave Deep Purple. This made the band's show in Paris on 7 April 1975 a historic moment in their long career, marking Blackmore's final appearance with the band until the band reformed in 1984.

The set took in tracks from Burn, Stormbringer and Machine Head/Made in Japan, and featured the band's Mk III line up for the last time. It was also the last time Deep Purple ever played the songs "The Gypsy", "Lady Double Dealer", "Mistreated" and "You Fool No One" live, though Rainbow and Whitesnake have played "Mistreated" in concert, and Whitesnake played "Lady Double Dealer" on their early concerts.

In 2012, a double CD entitled Paris 1975 was released. This has the same tracks, with an added near-half-hour interview with Coverdale, Hughes and Paice, but there is an edit on the introduction of "Burn" (minus 1 minute)

== Track listing ==
Disc One
No.	Title	Writer(s)	Length
1.	"Burn"	Ritchie Blackmore, David Coverdale, Jon Lord, Ian Paice	9:46
2.	"Stormbringer"	Blackmore, Coverdale	5:12
3.	"The Gypsy"	Blackmore, Coverdale, Glenn Hughes, Lord, Paice	6:11
4.	"Lady Double Dealer"	Blackmore, Coverdale	4:35
5.	"Mistreated"	Blackmore, Coverdale	12:49
6.	"Smoke on the Water"	Blackmore, Ian Gillan, Roger Glover, Lord, Paice	11:10
7.	"You Fool No One"	Blackmore, Coverdale, Lord, Paice	19:30

Disc Two
No.	Title	Writer(s)	Length
8.	"Space Truckin'"	Blackmore, Gillan, Glover, Lord, Paice	21:21
9.	"Going Down"	Don Nix	5:19
10.	"Highway Star"	Blackmore, Gillan, Glover, Lord, Paice	11:33

2003 & 2008 Japanese Papersleeve Release

Disc One
No.	Title	Length
1.	"Introduction"	1:54
2.	"Burn"	7:50
3.	"Stormbringer"	5:12
4.	"The Gypsy"	6:11
5.	"Lady Double Dealer"	4:35
6.	"Mistreated"	12:49
7.	"Smoke on the Water"	11:10
8.	"You Fool No One"	19:30

Disc Two
No.	Title	Length
9.	"Space Truckin'"	21:21
10.	"Going Down"	5:19
11.	"Highway Star"	11:33

2012 Deep Purple (Overseas) Live Series

Disc One
No.	Title	Length
1.	"Burn"	8:37
2.	"Stormbringer"	5:15
3.	"The Gypsy"	6:08
4.	"Lady Double Dealer"	4:26
5.	"Mistreated"	12:57
6.	"Smoke on the Water"	10:23
7.	"You Fool No One"	19:27

Disc Two
No.	Title	Length
8.	"Space Truckin'"	21:24
9.	"Going Down"	5:17
10.	"Highway Star"	11:35
11.	"1975 Interview With David Coverdale, Glenn Hughes & Ian Paice"	23:19

== Personnel ==
Deep Purple

- Ritchie Blackmore – guitars
- David Coverdale – lead vocals
- Glenn Hughes – bass guitar, lead and backing vocals
- Jon Lord – organ, keyboards, backing vocals
- Ian Paice – drums, percussion
