= Whoosh =

Whoosh may refer to:

- Whoosh, branding for high-speed rail service in Indonesia
- Whoosh (Duck Dodgers), a fictional character from the animated TV series Duck Dodgers
- Whoosh!, a 2020 album by Deep Purple
- Whoosh, a 1996 EP by Doctor Rockit
- Whoosh, a sculpture by Kate Davis at the Langdon Park DLR station, London, England
- Whoosh! Lonnie Johnson's Super-Soaking Stream on Inventions, a 2016 children's biography of Lonnie Johnson, by Chris Barton and Don Tate
- "Whoosh" salute, a tradition at the University of Texas at Dallas

== See also ==
- FlyWhoosh, a defunct UK airline
