= Pilgrimage (Wishbone Ash album) =

Studio album by Wishbone Ash
- Released: 17 September 1971
- Recorded: May 1971
- Studios: De Lane Lea Studios, London
- Genre: Progressive rock • hard rock • jazz fusion • folk rock
- Length: 39:30
- Label: Decca/MCA
- Producer: Derek Lawrence

Wishbone Ash chronology
Wishbone Ash (1970)	Pilgrimage (1971)	Argus (1972)

Professional ratings
Review scores
Source	Rating
AllMusic	4/5 stars

Pilgrimage is the second studio album by the rock band Wishbone Ash. The album focuses more on folk and acoustic music as opposed to the blues rock sound that dominated the first album. The album also contains the instrumental jazz workout "Vas Dis" as well as moodier, slower instrumentals such as "Alone" and "Lullaby".

The album sold well, reaching no. 14 in the UK Albums Chart, but the band reached their creative and commercial peak with their next studio release, Argus.

== Recording and composition ==
Following the band's debut album Wishbone Ash, they had toured extensively and felt they had improved their musical skills as a result, but had not been able to devote much time to writing new material. Therefore, Pilgrimage is largely composed of older songs that had not been used on Wishbone Ash.

"Vas Dis" was an old Jack McDuff jazz piece that Wishbone Ash had been performing live for some time as an exercise in turning a jazz number into a rock tune. The band rehearsed it in the studio, not realising that producer Derek Lawrence was recording, and it was this rehearsal take that appeared on the album.

"The Pilgrim" was composed largely by bass guitarist Martin Turner, consisting of two different pieces of music joined together. The first, slow part features one of the band's guitarists Ted Turner soloing while the other, Andy Powell, plays along with the bassline. The second, faster part reverses the guitarists' roles, with Powell soloing and Ted Turner playing along with the bass riff.

The live favourite "Jailbait" was composed "in about ten minutes" at a pub in Exeter, and came about as a joint band effort through jamming together. As the vocalist on this song, Ted Turner wrote a few lines of a lyric, which he completed with the help of drummer Steve Upton in about half an hour.

"Alone" dated from pre-Wishbone Ash days, having been performed by Martin Turner and Steve Upton's previous band The Empty Vessels. An early version of the song had been recorded by Wishbone Ash during a session at Advision Studios in 1970, but the band had chosen not to re-record it for their debut album, and it was shelved along with two other songs in favour of "Phoenix". This early version was later included on First Light, an album consisting of all the recordings made at Advision. "Alone" was revived during the Pilgrimage sessions and re-recorded as a six-minute song with vocals, but Lawrence felt that Martin Turner's vocal was unsuitable as "a bit too choirboy-ish, and not rock 'n' roll enough". He suggested cutting out the vocal parts, turning the song into a short instrumental. Turner reluctantly agreed and the rest of the band approved, although Turner later thought the whole song might have been better suited to the band's next album, Argus. The full version of the song was eventually released on the box set Distillation.

"Alone" was followed on Pilgrimage by another instrumental, "Lullaby", which was composed mostly by Powell and Ted Turner. The band decided to record it without drums, and considered leaving the bass guitar out as well, although ultimately a bass part was added.

"Valediction" was composed mostly by Powell, who also sang lead vocals, with Martin Turner providing a vocal harmony. Ted Turner added the reggae-style ending to the song.

The last track on the album, "Where Were You Tomorrow", was a live recording of a performance in Leicester shortly after the rest of the album had been recorded. It was a standard blues rock song running at over ten minutes, and was basically a jam with all the band members contributing. The lyric was composed with the help of the band's then-manager, Miles Copeland III, who also provided the song's title. A studio recording, with which the band were not particularly satisfied at the time, was later released on the anthology Time Was.

== Track listing ==
All tracks are written by Martin Turner, Steve Upton, Ted Turner and Andy Powell, except where noted.

Side one
No.	Title	Writer(s)	Length
1.	"Vas Dis"	Jack McDuff	4:39
2.	"The Pilgrim"		8:25
3.	"Jail Bait"		4:35
4.	"Alone"		2:20

Side two
No.	Title	Length
5.	"Lullaby"	2:55
6.	"Valediction"	6:11
7.	"Where Were You Tomorrow" (live at De Montfort Hall, Leicester on June 14, 1971)	10:25

Bonus track
No.	Title	Length
8.	"Jail Bait" (live)	4:54

Note: some issues incorrectly list "Alone" as being 2:55.

== Personnel ==
Wishbone Ash

- Andy Powell – guitar, backing vocals, lead vocals on "Where Were You Tomorrow"
- Ted Turner – guitar, backing vocals, lead vocals on "Jail Bait"
- Martin Turner – bass, lead vocals
- Steve Upton – drums

== Charts ==
Chart (1971–72)	Peak position
UK Albums (Official Charts)	14
US Billboard 200	174
