= Wishbone Ash (album) =

Studio album by Wishbone Ash
- Released: 4 December 1970
- Recorded: September 1970
- Studios: De Lane Lea Studios, London, England
- Genre: Hard rock • blues rock • progressive rock
- Length: 41:57
- Label: Decca/MCA
- Producer: Derek Lawrence

Wishbone Ash chronology
Wishbone Ash (1970)	Pilgrimage (1971)

Professional ratings
Review scores
Source	Rating
AllMusic	3/5 stars

Wishbone Ash is the first studio album by Wishbone Ash. It peaked at number 29 in the UK Albums Chart in January 1971.

== Background ==
The band opened for Deep Purple in early 1970. Deep Purple guitarist Ritchie Blackmore was jamming during the band's soundcheck, when Wishbone guitarist Andy Powell joined in and began jamming with Blackmore. After the show, Blackmore recommended that MCA Records sign the band. Deep Purple producer Derek Lawrence produced this album, which features elements of blues, jazz, progressive rock, and psychedelic improvisation.. The first side contains three uptempo tracks along with the ballad "Errors Of My Way" which, unusually for a rock song, was written in 12/8 time. Side two contains two lengthy tracks featuring long instrumental passages, the second of which, "Phoenix", was to become a live favourite often stretching in excess of 17 minutes, for example on their Live From Memphis EP and the Live Dates album.

== Track listing ==
All tracks are written by Martin Turner, Ted Turner, Steve Upton, Andy Powell

Side one
No.	Title	Length
1.	"Blind Eye"	3:40
2.	"Lady Whiskey"	6:08
3.	"Errors of My Way"	6:56
4.	"Queen of Torture"	3:20

Side two
No.	Title	Length
5.	"Handy"	11:30
6.	"Phoenix"	10:23

"Blind Eye" and "Queen of Torture" were released on 7" single, MCA MK5061 (Decca 32826 in US) (February 1971)

== Personnel ==
Wishbone Ash

- Andy Powell - lead guitar, backing vocals, harmony vocals on "Errors Of My Way"
- Ted Turner - lead guitar, lead vocals on "Blind Eye"
- Martin Turner - bass, lead vocals
- Steve Upton - drums

Guest appearance

- Matthew Fisher - piano

== Charts ==
Chart (1971)	Peak position
UK Albums (Official Charts)	29
