= A Diamond Is a Hard Rock =

Studio album by Legs Diamond
- Released: September 1977
- Studios: Cherokee, Los Angeles, California
- Genre: Hard rock
- Label: Mercury
- Producer: Eddie Leonetti

Legs Diamond chronology
Legs Diamond (1977)	A Diamond Is a Hard Rock (1977)	Fire Power (1978)

Professional ratings
Review scores
Source	Rating
AllMusic	4.5/5 stars

A Diamond Is a Hard Rock is the second album by the American rock band Legs Diamond.

== Track listing ==
No.	Title	Length
1.	"Diamond Is a Hard Rock"
2.	"Waiting"
3.	"Long Shot"
4.	"Woman"
5.	"Jailbait"
6.	"I Think I Got It"
7.	"Evil"
8.	"Live A Little"
9.	"Flyin' Too High"

2018 Rock Candy Records CD version bonus tracks

1. "High School Queen" (Demo)
2. "Teaser" (Demo)
3. "It Takes More Soul (To Rock & Roll)" (Demo)
4. "Stumbler" (Demo)
5. "Showtime In Chicago" (Demo)
6. "Evil" (Demo)

== Personnel ==
Legs Diamond

- Rick Sanford – lead vocals, flute, percussion
- Roger Romeo – lead guitar, lead vocals
- Michael Prince – rhythm guitar, keyboards, vocals
- Michael "Diamond" Gargano – bass guitar
- Jeff Poole – drums, percussion

Production

- Eddie Leonetti – producer
- Lee Decarlo – engineer
