= Whoosh! =

Studio album by Deep Purple
- Released: 7 August 2020
- Studios: Tracking Room, Nashville; Anarchy, Nashville; Ocean Way, Nashville; Noble Street, Toronto; Henson, Hollywood
- Genres: Hard rock; progressive rock
- Length: 51:29
- Label: earMusic
- Producer: Bob Ezrin

Deep Purple chronology
Infinite (2017)	Whoosh! (2020)	Turning to Crime (2021)

Singles from Whoosh!
- 1. "Throw My Bones" Released: 20 March 2020; 2. "Man Alive" Released: 30 April 2020; 3. "Nothing at All" Released: 10 July 2020

Whoosh! is the twenty-first studio album by English rock band Deep Purple, released on 7 August 2020. Although he appeared on their next album Turning to Crime, this is the last studio album of original material to feature longtime guitarist Steve Morse, who left the band in July 2022.

== Background ==
The group collaborated with producer Bob Ezrin, who had also worked on their previous two albums. They enjoyed the recording and production. Its release was promoted by a series of press statements from singer Ian Gillan, such as "Another album?! Whoosh?!! Gordon Bennett!!!". He explained the album's title was chosen for its onomatopoeic qualities, and "when viewed through one end of a radio-telescope, describes the transient nature of humanity on Earth". He also said fans should simply listen to the album as an enjoyable experience.

The album was originally set to be released on 12 June 2020, but was later postponed due to the COVID-19 pandemic. Gillan said that was because distribution lines for physical media should wait until lockdowns eased and restrictions lifted.

Three songs from the album were released as digital singles, beginning with "Throw My Bones". The third, "Nothing at All", deals with the themes of Mother Nature, man's response to climate change and - in its accompanying music video - plastic pollution.

The instrumental "And the Address" first appeared as the opening track on the band's 1968 debut album Shades of Deep Purple. The only musician to feature on both recordings was drummer Ian Paice.

== Release ==
The album is divided into "Act 1" (tracks 1 to 6) and "Act 2" (tracks 7 to 12), with "Dancing In My Sleep" being a bonus track present on all editions. However, the double LP does not abide by this division, as "What the What" is the last track on side 2.

There is also a CD+DVD "limited edition" (in mediabook packaging) that includes a full performance of Live At Hellfest 2017 (92 min), and "Roger Glover and Bob Ezrin in conversation (60 min)." This is also included in the Whoosh Box Set.

== Reception ==
Professional ratings
Aggregate scores
Source	Rating
Metacritic	69/100
Review scores
Source	Rating
AllMusic	4/5 stars
Blabbermouth.net	9/10
Brave Words & Bloody Knuckles	8.5/10
Classic Rock	4.5/5 stars
NME	3/5 stars
RIFF Magazine	8/10
The Times	2/5 stars

The album received generally favourable reviews. Several publications noticed the album contained relatively short tracks and praised the economical songwriting style. A review in NME said the album sounded nothing like contemporary music of 2020, but suggested that "maybe that's a good thing".

With a peak position of number 4, it was the band's highest-charting studio album in the United Kingdom for 46 years.

== Track listing ==
All tracks are written by Deep Purple and Bob Ezrin except where noted.

Whoosh! track listing
No.	Title	Writer(s)	Length
1.	"Throw My Bones"		3:38
2.	"Drop the Weapon"		4:23
3.	"We're All the Same in the Dark"		3:44
4.	"Nothing at All"		4:42
5.	"No Need to Shout"		3:30
6.	"Step by Step"		3:34
7.	"What the What"		3:32
8.	"The Long Way Round"		5:39
9.	"The Power of the Moon"		4:08
10.	"Remission Possible" (instrumental)		1:38
11.	"Man Alive"		5:35
12.	"And the Address" (instrumental)	Ritchie Blackmore and Jon Lord	3:35
Total length:			47:38

Bonus track
No.	Title	Length
13.	"Dancing in My Sleep"	3:51
Total length:		51:29

Bonus tracks on MSH edition
No.	Title	Length
14.	"Uncommon Man" (live in Rio 2017)	6:57
15.	"Knocking at Your Back Door" (live in Rio 2017)	5:49
16.	"Black Night" (live in Rio 2017)	8:14
Total length:		72:29

== Personnel ==
All information from the album booklet.

Deep Purple

- Ian Gillan – lead and backing vocals
- Steve Morse – guitar
- Roger Glover – bass guitar
- Ian Paice – drums
- Don Airey – Hammond organ, Moog voyager, ARP Odyssey, Kurzweil PC8K, Roland Fantom, Korg TR4

Additional musicians

- Saam Hashemi – programming on "Dancing in My Sleep"
- Ayana George, Tiffany Palmer – backing vocals on "No Need to Shout"
- Bob Ezrin – percussion, backing vocals

Production

- Bob Ezrin – producer, mixing
- Julian Shank – engineer, mixing
- Alex Krotz, Jamie Sickora – engineers
- Zach Pepe – engineer assistant
- Justin Cortelyou – mixing, tracking
- Jason Elliott, Justin Francis – mixing
- Bryce Robertson – tracking assistant
- Eric Boulanger – mastering
- John Metcalfe – orchestral arrangements on "Man Alive"
- Alan Umstead – conductor on "Man Alive"
- Nick Spezia – orchestra recording on "Man Alive"
- Ben Wolf – band photography
- Elena Saharova – landscape photography
- Jekyll & Hyde – cover art, design

== Charts ==
=== Weekly charts ===
Weekly chart performance for Whoosh!
Chart (2020)	Peak position
Australian Albums (ARIA)	13
Austrian Albums (Ö3 Austria)	1
Belgian Albums (Ultratop Flanders)	7
Belgian Albums (Ultratop Wallonia)	1
Czech Albums (ČNS IFPI)	2
Danish Albums (Hitlisten)	8
Dutch Albums (Album Top 100)	7
Finnish Albums (Suomen virallinen lista)	1
French Albums (SNEP)	8
German Albums (Offizielle Top 100)	1
Hungarian Albums (MAHASZ)	2
Italian Albums (FIMI)	6
Norwegian Albums (VG-lista)	3
Polish Albums (ZPAV)	2
Portuguese Albums (AFP)	26
Scottish Albums (Official Charts)	1
Slovak Albums (ČNS IFPI)	28
Spanish Albums (PROMUSICAE)	16
Swedish Albums (Sverigetopplistan)	3
Swiss Albums (Schweizer Hitparade)	1
UK Albums (Official Charts)	4
US Billboard 200	161
US Top Rock Albums (Billboard)	20
US Top Hard Rock Albums (Billboard)	4

=== Year-end charts ===
Year-end chart performance for Whoosh!
Chart (2020)	Position
Austrian Albums (Ö3 Austria)	56
Belgian Albums (Ultratop Wallonia)	161
German Albums (Offizielle Top 100)	26
Polish Albums (ZPAV)	68
Swiss Albums (Schweizer Hitparade)	26
