= Legs Diamond (album) =

Studio album by Legs Diamond
- Released: 15 Mar 1977
- Studio: Wally Heider Studios, Los Angeles, California
- Genre: Hard rock
- Length: 38:45
- Label: Mercury
- Producer: Derek Lawrence

Legs Diamond chronology
| Legs Diamond (1977) | A Diamond Is A Hard Rock (1977) |

Professional ratings
Review scores
| Source | Rating |
|---|---|
| AllMusic | 4/5 stars |
| Collector's Guide to Heavy Metal | 8/10 |

Legs Diamond is the debut album by the American rock band Legs Diamond.

In 1989, Kerrang! magazine listed the album at No. 33 among the "100 Greatest Heavy Metal Albums of All Time".

== Track listings ==
All tracks are written by Michael Prince and Michael "Diamond" Gargano, except where noted.

Side one
| No. | Title | Length |
|---|---|---|
| 1. | "It's Not the Music" (Prince, Rick Sanford) | 3:27 |
| 2. | "Stage Fright" (Prince) | 5:05 |
| 3. | "Satin Peacock" | 5:36 |
| 4. | "Rock and Roll Man" | 6:11 |

Side two
| No. | Title | Length |
|---|---|---|
| 5. | "Deadly Dancer" | 2:58 |
| 6. | "Rat Race" | 6:43 |
| 7. | "Can't Find Love" | 8:45 |

2000 Zoom Club CD version and 2007 Diamond Records CD version bonus track

8. "Come with Me" (Legs Diamond) – 4:41

2018 Rock Candy Records CD version bonus tracks

1. "Come with Me" (Album Outtake)
2. "Rat Race" (1976 K-West Radio)
3. "Thrill Seeker" (Demo)
4. "High School Queen" (Demo)
5. "Not Yours Not Mine" (Demo)
6. "Deadly Dancer" (Demo)
7. "One Way Ticket" (Demo)
8. "Avalanche" (Demo)
9. "Traces" (Demo)
10. "Street Runner" (Demo)
11. "Closer" (Demo)
12. "Food for Thought" (Demo)

== Personnel ==
Legs Diamond

- Rick Sanford – lead vocals, flute, percussion
- Roger Romeo – lead guitar, lead vocals
- Michael Prince – rhythm guitar, keyboards, vocals
- Michael "Diamond" Gargano – bass guitar
- Jeff Poole – drums, percussion

Production

- Derek Lawrence – producer
- Peter Granet – engineer
- David Gertz – assistant engineer
