= Mandrake Root =

Song by Deep Purple

from the album Shades of Deep Purple
- Released: July 1968
- Recorded: 11–13 May 1968
- Genre: Psychedelic rock; progressive rock; hard rock; blues rock
- Length: 6:09
- Label: Parlophone (UK); Tetragrammaton (United States)
- Songwriters: Ritchie Blackmore, Rod Evans, Jon Lord
- Producer: Derek Lawrence

"Mandrake Root" is a song by Deep Purple that is featured on their debut album Shades of Deep Purple. The title is in reference to the mandrake plant, but is also the name of a pre-Purple band that Blackmore was trying to form in Germany when he got the call from Deep Purple's original management.

== Recording ==
Deep Purple recorded their first studio album in May 1968. Of the eight songs that were included, (an additional one, "Shadows", was cut as a demo but scrapped from the album), only four of them were written by the band itself. Additionally, one of these songs, "And the Address", is an instrumental. The studio version of "Mandrake Root" is just over six minutes long. Many full recordings of the live arrangement exceed the twenty-minute mark.

"Mandrake Root" was performed and recorded at the same time as their first instrumental, "And the Address", and was originally meant to be an instrumental as well. The lyrics weren't added until after rehearsals took place before the album-recording of Shades of Deep Purple in May, 1968, the group having decided that they did not want more than one instrumental track on the album. The main track was recorded on 12 May. The song features many sound effects, which were picked from the BBC Library.

== Writing ==
The song has a rather controversial writing history. Though it is officially credited to Rod Evans, Jon Lord and Ritchie Blackmore, according to Jerry Bloom's unauthorized biography of Ritchie Blackmore, the chord progression and melody were first written by guitarist Bill Parkinson and called "Lost Soul". The song was conceived as a drum solo for Carlo Little (Rolling Stones' original drummer), who like Blackmore had played with The Savages, the backing band for Screaming Lord Sutch. Simper said Blackmore learned the melody "note for note" from Little. Bill Parkinson was lead guitarist with the Savages Jul-Sep 1966, while Blackmore had played with Sutch May-Oct 1962, Feb-May 1965 and Dec 1966 – Apr 1967, so their paths had clearly crossed. As this song, along with "Hush," pushed the fledgeling band sky high, it wasn't surprising that word about it got back to Parkinson. Not happy with regard "to what he saw as the rip-off" of "Lost Soul," Parkinson turned up on Simper's doorstep to complain. He threatened court action to Simper, who at that time already left Deep Purple but agreed with some reluctance to testify for him. "But," Simper said, "...I never saw Bill again. Apparently they paid him off with about £600."

== Live performances ==
The song would become an early concert staple for the band, with the organ/piano and guitar solos extended at times for up to 15 minutes. One of the few Mk I era songs to continue being played by Mk II and sung by Ian Gillan, a similar instrumental would be paired in later years with the extended live versions of "Space Truckin'." In the version of "Space Truckin'" recorded for the 1972 live Made in Japan album, riffs from "Mandrake Root" can be heard during the instrumental parts. For the guitar solo, Blackmore would frequently throw his guitar into the air, play it with his feet, or perform similar crowd pleasing tricks.

When the guitar solo was played at California Jam, Blackmore went as far as to smash a TV camera lens with his guitar, smash a couple of his guitars, throw his guitar into the crowd, blow up his amplifiers, which caused a stage fire, and pull his destroyed amplifier off the stage. This incident nearly got the band arrested, and Blackmore would later say in an interview that he did it to vent his anger of his experience at the festival, and to try to upstage the band Emerson, Lake & Palmer.
