= Nick Simper =

English bass guitarist (born 1945)

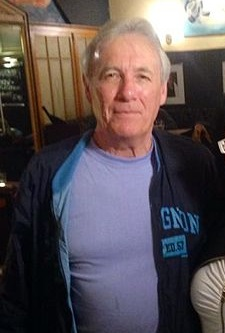
- Simper in 2015

Background information
- Born: Nicholas John Simper; 3 November 1945 (age 80); Norwood Green, Southall, Middlesex, England
- Genres: Rock; hard rock; blues rock; psychedelic rock; heavy metal; progressive rock; country rock
- Occupation: Musician
- Instrument: Bass
- Years active: 1957–present
- Website: nicksimper.net

Nicholas John Simper (born 3 November 1945) is an English bassist, who was a co-founding member of Deep Purple and Warhorse. In the 1960s, he began his professional career in bands such as Johnny Kidd & the Pirates, The Flower Pot Men, and Lord Sutch's Savages.

== Biography ==
Simper was born in Frogmore House Maternity Home, Norwood Green, Southall, Middlesex. Prior to co-founding Deep Purple in 1968, Simper played for a number of bands, including The Renegades (1960–1961), The Delta Five (1961–1963), Some Other Guys (1963–1964), Buddy Britten & The Regents renamed Simon Raven Cult (1964–1966) and Johnny Kidd & the Pirates. After a few months of his joining The Pirates, Simper and Kidd were involved in a car crash that took Kidd's life and left Simper injured. After recovering, Simper briefly reactivated The Pirates as a tribute band to Kidd (1966–1967) before joining the Garden, the backing band for The Flower Pot Men (1967–1968), where he played alongside Jon Lord who initially suggested that Simper be asked to join Deep Purple. Simper also had a brief encounter with Lord Sutch's Savages.

Simper played bass on three Deep Purple albums from 1968 to 1969. He was fired from Deep Purple in mid-1969 together with original singer Rod Evans. When new singer Ian Gillan from the band Episode Six was sought as a replacement for Evans, bandmate Roger Glover tagged along to play bass at some rehearsals and recorded the single "Hallelujah" for Deep Purple.

After his departure, he briefly worked with Marsha Hunt before forming his own band Warhorse, that recorded two albums for Vertigo. Warhorse was managed by Ron Hire, originally part of HEC Enterprises, the original investors in Deep Purple. During this time, Simper also played on a Lord Sutch live album, along with Ritchie Blackmore and Keith Moon.

For Warhorse, the breakthrough of a big selling album had not occurred. There was very strong interest from Warner Bros., with their senior A&R rep (Dave Dee) attempting to sign the band to the label. At Warner Bros. expense, they went into the studio and recorded two tracks, competing with Heavy Metal Kids.

By 1974, crippling finances signalled the end for the band. Warhorse's last gig in late 1974 was at Polhill College, Bedford. Unfortunately, their 2000-Watt Midas P.A. broke down and despite the best efforts of their roadie and managers it could not be made to perform properly. They tried, and performed a B.B. King song (Three O'clock in the Morning) to see if they could manage some kind of performance, but made their apologies to the audience and left.

Simper and guitarist Pete Parks spent the next three years writing, recording and initially formed a new band, called Nick Simper's Dynamite (1975) that released one single.

On 9 October 1976, Simper took part in the Johnny Kidd 10th Anniversary Memorial Show at the Edwardian Club at the Loughborough Hotel in Brixton.

With no financial backing, along with Parks, Simper succeeded to get Nick Simper's Fandango (1977–1983) off the ground and released two albums. Around the same time, Frankie Reid formed the band Flying Fox (1977–1984) with Carlo Little, Simper and Parks to play rock 'n' roll whenever they were free from commitments from their other bands.

After Little's departure the band renamed itself The Good Old Boys (1985–present). In the mid-1990s, drummer Mick Underwood invited Simper to become part of the reactivated Quatermass, which had released one album on Harvest in 1970. Under the guise of Quatermass II (1994–1997) they recorded one album.

In 2007, Simper also joined the line-up of Adelle & Co with Parks, Adelle Kirk, Jim Byers and Richard Hudson.

Since launching his own website in the 2000s, Simper has renewed his contact with a wider audience. The renaissance of his work has led to a one-off reunion of Warhorse in 2003 (and also 2005). During a gig in Austria in 2007, Simper performed the Deep Purple song "Emmaretta" with the support band Nasty Habits. On 6 September 2008, The Good Ol' Boys stepped in towards the end to support Deep Purple tribute band 24 Carat Purple at the Mick Jagger Centre, Dartford. Simper played "Hush" as a guest with this band, using bassist Pete Hartley's bass guitar. In March 2009, Simper again performed with Nasty Habits in Austria. The band played a setlist composed of songs from the first three Deep Purple studio albums. Later that year, Nick Simper & Nasty Habits played another show in Plock, Poland.

In 2010, Simper and Nasty Habits played more shows presenting "The Deep Purple Mark One Songbook" in Austria, Switzerland, Hungary and Poland while an album was in the making. The Budapest show was recorded for future release.

=== Rock and Roll Hall of Fame snub ===
In 2016, Deep Purple was inducted into the Rock and Roll Hall of Fame. All members from the band's first seven years (1968 to 1974) were announced as individual inductees, except Simper, but including original lead singer Rod Evans whose tenure in Deep Purple paralleled Simper's. Evans had also been successfully sued by Deep Purple's management in 1980 for performing an unauthorized tour under the band name; Simper had been approached by the same promotion company that had hired Evans, but declined to participate.

Simper stated, "Yes, it is a little strange that I am [the] only one from Marks I, II and III being left out, but I shan't lose any sleep over this. It's not as if I need to be given this award to know what we did in Deep Purple made an impact. And I'm sure it wasn't a decision that came from the band."

== Discography ==
Year	Band	Title	Notes
1968	Deep Purple	Shades of Deep Purple	Re-mastered ed.: 2000
1968	Deep Purple	The Book of Taliesyn	Re-mastered ed.: 2000
1969	Deep Purple	Deep Purple	Re-mastered ed.: 2000
1972	Deep Purple	Purple Passages	Compilation, Japan re-release: 1993
1973	Deep Purple	Mark I & II	Compilation
2002	Deep Purple	Inglewood – Live in California	Re-release: 2009
2004	Deep Purple	The Early Years	Compilation
2011	Deep Purple	BBC Sessions 1968–1970	
1970	Johnny Kidd & The Pirates	The Johnny Kid Memorial Album	Compilation
1978	Johnny Kidd & The Pirates	The Best of Johnny Kid & The Pirates	Compilation
1983	Johnny Kidd & The Pirates	Rarities	Compilation
1990	Johnny Kidd & The Pirates	The Classic & Rare	Compilation
1970	Warhorse	Warhorse	UK: Vertigo 6360 015, :UK re-releases: 1983, Thunderbolt THBL-004 (as "Vulture Blood") / 1997, RPM Records RPM-174, incl. bonus tracks / 1998, Angel Air SJPCD 034, incl. bonus tracks
1972	Warhorse	Red Sea	UK: Vertigo, :UK re-releases: 1984, Thunderbolt THBL-010 / 1997, RPM Records RPM-175, incl. bonus tracks / 1998, Angel Air SJPCD 035, incl. bonus tracks
1997	Warhorse	The Warhorse Story – Vols I & II	[2CD]: UK 1997 RPM Records RPM-501[
1974	Nick Simper's Dynamite	St. Louis / Soul Rider (Single)	
1979	Nick Simper's Fandango	Slipstreaming	Germany: Shark Records INT 148.503 / UK: Gull Records GULP 1033
1980	Nick Simper's Fandango	Future Times	Germany: Shark Records INT 148.506
1982	Nick Simper's Fandango	Just Another Day/Wish I'd Never Woke Up (Single)	UK SP: Paro Records Paro-S4
1994	Nick Simper's Fandango	Slipstreaming / Future Times	UK 2CD: RPM Records RPM-125; UK 2CD: Angel Air SJPCD 041 (incl. bonus tracks)
1982	Flying Fox	Flying Fox	ltd. ed. cassette
1997	Quatermass II	Long Road	UK: Thunderbird CSA 108 / Japan: PCCY-01156
2005	The Good Old Boys	Live At the Horns (CD+DVD)	unofficial release
2007	The Good Old Boys	We Can't Do This When We're Dead – Rock n' Roll!!! (DVD)	unofficial release
2009	The Good Old Boys	Live At the Deep Purple Convention	UK: Wymer Records TSA1001
2009	Nasty Habits	The Austrian Tapes – Live At the Orpheum Graz (DVD)	unofficial release
2009	Nasty Habits	The Austrian Tapes – Live At the Reigen (DVD)	unofficial release
2010	Nasty Habits	Dolina Charlotty – See You in August (DVD)	unofficial release
2010	Nasty Habits	The Deep Purple MKI Songbook (CD)	UK: Wymer Records TSA1002
2012	Nasty Habits	Live at Szene, Vienna (CD+DVD)	UK: Angel Air Records SJPCD386
2015	Nasty Habits	De La Frog Conspiracy (CD)	studio album
2010	Blaggards & Cowboys	Skulduggery (CD)	self-released

=== Guest appearances ===
- 1972 Hands of Jack the Ripper (Screaming Lord Sutch & Heavy Friends)
- 1983 Roscoe Rocks Again (Roscoe Gordon)
- 2003 Rag Moppin' (Wee Willie Harris & the Alabama Slammers)
- 2007 Carlo Little Night of Honour (DVD)
- 2008 White Horses of Lyme Bay (CD EP)
- 2009 Never Stop Rockin' (Carlo Little All Stars)
