= Legs Diamond (band) =

American rock band

- Origin: Los Angeles, California, U.S.
- Genres: Hard rock, progressive rock, heavy metal
- Years active: 1975–1980, 1984–present
- Labels: AOR Heaven, Zoom Club, Music for Nations, Metal Blade, Target, Cream, Mercury
- Members: Keith England; Roger Romeo; Michael Durham Prince; Jeff Poole; Adam Kury
- Past members: Michael "Diamond" Gargano; Rick Sanford; John Levesque; Dusty Watson
- Website: legsdiamond.com

Legs Diamond is an American rock band formed in 1975. They formed in Los Angeles, California, with original members Michael "Diamond" Gargano (bass), Jeff Poole (drums), Roger Romeo (guitar), Rick Sanford (vocals) and Michael Prince (keyboards and guitar) and were named for a 1920s gangster of the same name.

== History ==
The group released their self-titled debut album for Mercury Records in 1977. The original band broke up in 1980 after three popular albums, but reformed in 1984 after their original albums had begun to acquire a cult following and released 2 more albums.

In 1990 they released a new album on Metal Blade records and the lineup was Rick Sanford (vocals), Roger Romeo (lead guitar), Michael Prince (keyboards and guitar), Dusty Watson (drums) and Mike Christie (bass).

In 2005, original frontman Rick Sanford was replaced by ex-Montrose and Wild Horses vocalist John Levesque, and the band released the album, Diamonds Are Forever, in 2006. Original members include Roger Romeo (guitar), Michael Prince (keyboards/rhythm guitar), and Jeff Poole (percussion).

Keyboardist Michael Prince is active in studio recording, in Los Angeles, working with some better known R+B and pop acts, including Beyoncé, Chris Brown, Usher, and Los Lobos.

Guitarist Roger Romeo is active in several bands including a band with Jeff Poole called the Riff Rockers.

On March 30, 2018, the band's first three studio albums, Legs Diamond, A Diamond Is a Hard Rock, and Fire Power, were re-issued by British label Rock Candy Records, each containing a plethora of bonus tracks.

In 2019, Legs Diamond acquired a new lead singer, Keith England, and are currently working on a new album and eventually touring again.

== Members ==
=== Current ===
- Keith England – lead vocals (2019–present)
- Roger Romeo – lead guitar (1975–1980, 1984–present)
- Michael Prince – rhythm guitar, keyboards (1975–1980, 1984–present)
- Adam Kury – bass (1992–present)
- Jeff Poole – drums (1975–1980, 1984–present)

=== Former ===
- John Levesque – lead vocals (2005)
- Dusty Watson – drums
- Rick Sanford – lead vocals (1976–2005)
- Michael "Diamond" Gargano – bass
- Mike Christie – bass
- Jim May – lead guitar & vocals
- Jonathan Valen – drums
- Jeff Marcus – guitar

== Discography ==
=== Albums ===
- Legs Diamond (1977)
- A Diamond Is a Hard Rock (1977)
- Fire Power (1978)
- Out on Bail (1984) (US version is mini-album, EU version is full album with 2 extra songs)
- Land of the Gun (1986)
- Town Bad Girl (1990)
- Captured Live (1992) (1990 live recording in San Antonio, Texas)
- The Wish (1993)
- Uncut Diamond (1999) (never released album recorded in 1980)
- Collection (2003) (4 CD collection of the first three albums plus 'Uncut Diamond')
- Favourites Volume One (2004) (compilation with two new songs)
- Diamonds Are Forever (2006)
- Right on Target (2008) (3-CD Box Set includes first three albums)

=== Singles ===
- "Stage Fright" (1976) Mercury/Phonogram
- "Woman" (1977) Mercury/Phonogram
- "You've Lost That Lovin' Feelin'" (1978) Cream
- "Help Wanted" (1979) Cream
- "Turn to Stone" (1986) Metronome
