= Tetragrammaton Records =

Defunct American record label co-founded by Bill Cosby

- Founded: 1968
- Founder: Roy Silver, Bruce Post Campbell, Marvin Deane & Bill Cosby
- Defunct: 1970
- Country of origin: United States

Tetragrammaton Records was an American record label founded in 1968 by music industry executives Roy Silver, Bruce Post Campbell, Marvin Deane, and comedian Bill Cosby. Silver, at the time, was also Cosby's manager. The term "Tetragrammaton" refers to the Hebrew name of God considered by some to be unspeakable (YHWH, or "Yahweh", translated as "Jehovah" in English). The label's most successful act was rock band Deep Purple.

== History ==
Tetragrammaton was also responsible for releasing the controversial 1968 Apple Records album Unfinished Music No. 1: Two Virgins in the United States. This avant-garde album was recorded by John Lennon and Yoko Ono and featured nude photos of the pair on the front and back cover. Tetragrammaton stepped in as distributor after Capitol Records, the usual US distributor for Apple and the Beatles, refused the album, citing a possible negative response from retailers.

The Lennon/Ono album was also declared to be pornography by some authorities. Tetragrammaton went into financial difficulties, which may have been related to the distribution of the Lennon/Ono album. Approximately 30,000 copies of the record were seized by police at a warehouse in New Jersey. The records were held as evidence in a court case, which made it impossible for the label to sell them at the time.

Tetragrammaton also signed the British group Deep Purple in 1968, releasing their debut single in June, a cover of the Joe South song, "Hush", which reached #4 on the Billboard Hot 100 in September, as well as bringing the band to the US for their first American tour in October that year and releasing their first three albums.

Bill Cosby's 1969 stand-up comedy album, 8:15 12:15, was also released by the label, as were two albums by comedian Murray Roman, You Can't Beat People Up & Have Them Say I Love You and A Blind Man's Movie.

A number of the label's projects were left unissued. Among these were a second album by singer songwriter Elyse Weinberg, and an album by Memphis musician Captain Milk (real name, Edwin Hubbard) who described himself as a "flute picker". Tetragrammaton did however release a single of the Lennon/McCartney song "Hey Jude" from the Captain Milk recording sessions. An English rock band named Bodast also recorded an unreleased album for Tetragrammaton in 1968. The group featured guitarist Steve Howe, later a member of Yes. The Bodast recordings were first released in 1981 by Cherry Red Records.

Despite having several popular artists on its roster, Tetragrammaton ceased trading after declaring bankruptcy in 1970. In 1972, Deep Purple's new label, Warner Bros. Records (also Cosby's former label), reissued various tracks from the group's first three Tetragrammaton albums on one compilation album entitled Purple Passages. In Canada, some of Tetragrammaton's releases were manufactured and distributed by the Canadian division of Polydor Records, which also issued several Canada-only Deep Purple compilations after Tetragrammaton's demise. Universal Music Canada holds the Canadian rights to those compilations to this day.

Tetragrammaton's co-founder, Marvin Deane, died of heart failure on August 16, 2010, in Los Angeles, California, at age 79.

== Discography ==
- T-101 – You Can't Beat People Up and Have Them Say I Love You – Murray Roman [1968]
- T-102 – Shades of Deep Purple – Deep Purple [7/68]
- T-103 – The Thorn in Mrs. Rose's Side – Biff Rose [1968]
- T-104 – Ivory – Ivory [1968]
- T-105 – Let Me Show You the Way – Bobby Paris [1968]
- T-106 – Together Again for the First Time – Carol Burnett & Martha Raye [1968]
- T-107 – The Book of Taliesyn – Deep Purple [11/68]
- T-110 – Both Sides Now – Johnstons [1968]
- T-111 – Relight My Fire – Rhetta Hughes [1969]
- T-112 – Sweet Thursday – Sweet Thursday [1969]
- T-113 – Tom Ghent – Tom Ghent [1969]
- T-114 – Summerhill – Summerhill [1968]
- T-116 – Children of Light – Biff Rose [1969]
- T-117 – Elyse – Elyse Weinberg [6/1/69]
- T-118 – Departure – Pat Boone [1969]
- T-119 – Deep Purple – Deep Purple [6/69]
- T-120 – Blind Man's Movie – Murray Roman [1969]
- T-123 – The Mother of Us All – Steve Baron Quartet [1969]
- T-124 – Hello Love [aka Gene and Francesca] – Gene & Francesca [1969]
- T-125 – Joshua Fox – Joshua Fox [1969]
- T-12? – Greasepaint Smile – Elyse Weinberg [unissued]
- T-131 – Concerto for Group and Orchestra – Deep Purple [1969]
- T-5000 – The Girl on a Motorcycle (Soundtrack) – Douglas Gamley & British Lion Orchestra [1969]
- Apple/Tetragrammaton T-5001 – Unfinished Music No. 1: Two Virgins – John Lennon & Yoko Ono [01/1969]
- T-5002 – Quatrain – Quatrain [1969]
- T-5003 – Mark Slade's New Hat – Mark Slade [1968]
- T-5006 – Che! (soundtrack) – Lalo Schifrin [1969]
- T-5007 – The Chairman (Soundtrack) – Jerry Goldsmith [1969]
- TD-5100 – 8:15 12:15 – Bill Cosby [6/1/1969]
- TD-5101 – Once Upon a Time – Kingston Trio [1969]
- TDL 5200 – The Great White Hope (Original Cast) – Charles Gross & Cast [1969]

== See also ==
- List of record labels
