= Peter Mew =

British music audio engineer

Peter Mew is a retired British music audio engineer. He worked at Abbey Road Studios, where he was the senior mastering engineer. He came to Abbey Road in 1965 as a tape operator and has since worked with many artists at the studio. Kevin Ayers of Soft Machine has called Mew "the best engineer I've ever worked with".

== Biography ==
Mew has had a prolific career at the Abbey Road Studios, home base of groups like The Beatles, Pink Floyd, and recording engineers such as Alan Parsons. He was involved on the historic Syd Barrett solo recordings, and remastered his compilation albums.

He started his career at Abbey Road as a tea boy, then tape-op, and finally as a recording engineer, on Pretty Things' S.F. Sorrow, in 1967. He was responsible for not deadening the studio, keeping its multidimensional sound, thereby allowing the installations to be used for orchestral sessions, and giving the studio its trademark sound.

During the early 1980s he pioneered the CD preparation installation in the studio, while working on several outstanding projects.

As the senior mastering engineer, he mastered records in stereo and surround, on CD, DVD, and SACD. Working with the Sonic Solutions suite, he has restored albums by a considerable number of artists (basically most of those who have used the Abbey Road facilities at one point or another).

On 29 August 2013, Mew retired after a 50-year career.
