= Derek Lawrence =

English record producer (1941–2020)

- Born: Derek John Lawrence; 16 November 1941; Barnet, London, England
- Died: 13 May 2020 (aged 78) Peterborough, England
- Genres: Rock
- Occupation: Record producer
- Years active: 1960s–1990s

Derek John Lawrence (16 November 1941 – 13 May 2020) was an English record producer, famous for his work for Joe Meek's Outlaws, Deep Purple, Flash, Machiavel, Wishbone Ash, and the Randy Rhoads era of Quiet Riot.

Lawrence came in contact with Meek circa at the end of 1963, when he managed a group, Laurie Black and the Men of Mystery, that won a recording session at Joe Meek's studio. He continued working for him until 1965. He brought him Merseybeaters Freddie Starr and the Midnighters.

In the late 1960s, he worked for Harold Shampan at Film Music (part of Top Rank) and as freelance producer (inspired by Meek) for The Pretty Things, The Zephyrs, The V.I.P.'s, The Nocturnes etc. He produced Jethro Tull's debut single "Sunshine Day" (1968). Ritchie Blackmore, whom he had known from previous work, invited him to work with Blackmore's new band, and as a result Lawrence produced Deep Purple's first three albums, the first at Pye Studios in London and the next two at De Lane Lea Studios, Kingsway, London. He produced Flash's first two albums, Flash (1972) and In The Can (1973), both at De Lane Lea. After struggling with Flash's ex-Yes guitarist, Peter Banks, he recommended that the band replace Banks, and suggested several top names. It was advice that they failed to heed, which led to the band's abrupt break up while on tour after the release of their third self-produced album, Out Of Our Hands (1973). He produced Wishbone Ash's first three albums Wishbone Ash (1970), Pilgrimage (1971) and Argus (1972), and returned to produce their ninth album No Smoke Without Fire (1978).

In 1974, Lawrence partnered with noted session musician Big Jim Sullivan to form the record label Retreat Records, also the home for Sullivan's Big Jim's Back (1975). Lawrence co-produced Sullivan's new band Tiger, featuring future Samson vocalist Nicky Moore, who released three albums before splitting up. Stateside, Lawrence and Sullivan co-produced the first two albums by Angel; Angel (1975) and Helluva Band (1976), respectively. Lawrence also helmed Legs Diamond's self-titled 1976 debut. At the turn of the decade, he oversaw the MCA debuts by a pair of NWOBHM contenders, Fist's Turn the Hell On and Stand Up and Fight by Quartz, both issued in 1980. Returning to his home country in 1979, Lawrence reduced his involvement, but worked with both Carl Wayne and Hot Chocolate's Tony Wilson in the 1980s. Along with Sullivan in 1992 he produced Survival, the debut album by the British band Little Brother for Line Records.

Lawrence died from cancer on 13 May 2020, at the age of 78.
