= Cheyenne (disambiguation) =

The Cheyenne are a Native American people, whose native language is the Cheyenne language.

Cheyenne may also refer to:

== Places in the United States ==
- Cheyenne, Kansas, a ghost town
- Cheyenne, Oklahoma, a town
- Cheyenne, Wyoming, the state capital of Wyoming
- Cheyenne County (disambiguation)
- Cheyenne Township (disambiguation)
- Cheyenne Mountain, Colorado
- Cheyenne Creek, Colorado
- Cheyenne Creek (South Dakota)
- Cheyenne River, in Wyoming and South Dakota
- Cheyenne Valley, West Virginia
- Cheyenne Valley, Wisconsin, a ghost town

== People ==
- Cheyenne (given name)

== Arts, entertainment, and media ==
=== Films ===
- Cheyenne (1929 film), a silent Western starring Ken Maynard
- Cheyenne (1947 film), a Western starring Dennis Morgan and Jane Wyman

=== Music ===
- "Cheyenne" (1906 song), a Western song
- Cheyenne, album by Martin Rev, 1991
- "Cheyenne" (Jason Derulo song), 2015
- "Cheyenne" (Francesca Michielin song), 2019

=== Other arts, entertainment, and media ===
- Cheyenne (TV series), a Western TV show
- Cheyenne Enterprises, an American television and film production company partially owned by Bruce Willis
- Cheyenne, Nebraska, a fictional location in the AMC-TV television series Hell on Wheels, the town formerly called "Durant, Nebraska"
- Cheyenne (video game), a 1984 Western arcade shooting video game

== Military ==
- Cheyenne Mountain Complex, a United States Space Force installation and defensive bunker
- USS Cheyenne, six vessels, including
  - USNS Cheyenne, a miscellaneous auxiliary, originally a Victory ship
- Lockheed AH-56 Cheyenne, a military attack helicopter
- Bell MV-75 Cheyenne II, a tiltrotor aircraft

== Transportation ==
- Cheyenne (catamaran), a large catamaran captained by Steve Fossett that set a transatlantic record
- USCGC Cheyenne, a United States Coast Guard river buoy tender
- Cheyenne (1881 HBC vessel) - see Boats of the Mackenzie River watershed
- Chevrolet Cheyenne (concept car), introduced in 2003
- Chevrolet Cheyenne, a series of pickup trucks marketed in Mexico as a rebadged Chevrolet Silverado
- Cheyenne Transit, serving Laramie County, Wyoming
- Cheyenne Regional Airport, Cheyenne, Wyoming
- Piper PA-31T Cheyenne, a turboprop aircraft
- Piper PA-42 Cheyenne, a turboprop aircraft

== Other uses ==
- Cheyenne (supercomputer), located in Cheyenne, Wyoming
- Disney's Hotel Cheyenne, Disneyland Paris
- Cheyenne Software, original name of American software company Arcserve
- Cheyenne High School (disambiguation)
- Cheyenne Indians (baseball), a baseball team
- Cheyenne Warriors, an indoor football team in 2012 and 2013

== See also ==
- List of places named Cheyenne
- Cheyenne belt, a geological tectonic suture zone
- Cheyenne Sandstone, a geologic formation in Kansas
- Cayenne (disambiguation)
- Chayanne (disambiguation)
- Sheyenne (disambiguation)
