= List of places named Cheyenne =

Places named after the Cheyenne are:

== Places ==
=== Colorado ===
==== Boulder County ====
- Cheyenne Arapaho Hall, a building at the University of Colorado in Boulder

==== El Paso County ====
- Cheyenne Creek, Colorado
- Cheyenne Mountain, a mountain in Colorado
  - Cheyenne Mountain Complex, a United States Space Force installation and defensive bunker within Cheyenne Mountain
- Cheyenne Lodge, alternate name for the Cheyenne Mountain Lodge on Cheyenne Mountain
- Cheyenne Spring House, an 1890s building enclosing one of the Manitou Mineral Springs
- North Cheyenne Cañon Park, a city-owned park including area outside both the North and South canons (Cheyenne Park and Stratton Park in 1900)
- South Cheyenne Cañon, a landform near Colorado Springs with private toll road from the Pillars of Hercules to Seven Falls

==== Cheyenne County ====
- Cheyenne County, Colorado, the 1889 area created from portions of Elbert and Bent counties
- Cheyenne County Courthouse (Colorado), a 1908 building in Cheyenne Wells
- Cheyenne County Jail, an 1894 building in Cheyenne Wells
- Cheyenne Wells, Colorado, the Cheyenne County seat

=== Kansas ===
- Cheyenne County, Kansas

=== Montana ===
- Northern Cheyenne Indian Reservation in Montana

=== Nebraska ===
- Cheyenne County, Nebraska

=== Oklahoma ===
- Cheyenne, Oklahoma, a town in Roger Mills County, Oklahoma

=== South Dakota ===
- Cheyenne Creek (South Dakota)
- Cheyenne River, in Wyoming and South Dakota
- Cheyenne River Indian Reservation in South Dakota

=== Wyoming ===
- Cheyenne, Wyoming, the capital of Wyoming
- Cheyenne belt, a tectonic suture zone
- Cheyenne River, in Wyoming and South Dakota

== See also ==
- Cheyenne (disambiguation)
- Cheyenne County (disambiguation)
- Cheyenne Township (disambiguation)
