= Roberto Who..? =

Single by Cayenne featuring vocals by Linda Taylor

from the album Roberto Who..?
- A-side: "Roberto Who..?"
- B-side: "Roberto Who..? (Instrumental)"
- Written: Greenfield/Taylor/Carthy
- Released: 1981
- Label: Groove Production GP 3012 (12"); Groove Production GP 307 (7")
- Producer(s): Chris Palmer

Roberto Who..? is a song by the British band Cayenne. Released on the Groove Production label, it was a hit in the UK in 1981, charting on both the Record Business Top 50 Disco chart and the Twelve Inchers chart.

== Background ==
The song became a dancefloor hit in clubs around the world and it won awards in both Mexico and Greece.

There was an error in the July 13 issue of Record Business regarding the catalogue number for the 12" version of the record. The correct catalogue number was s GP 3012. The magazine posted the correct information in the August 3 issue.

James Hamilton reported in his "Odds 'N' Bods" column for the week of July 18 that Cayenne had recorded a Spanish version of the song for overseas release.

Linda Taylor co-wrote the song.

The album was a mix of jazz, funk and salsa and it made the funk chart in the US. The arrangements were handled by Robert Greenfield.

== Charts ==
Cayenne's single "Roberto Who?", credited to Cayenne featuring Linda Taylor debuted at No. 30 on the Record Business Disco Top 50 chart on the week of July 20. It peaked at No. 24 on the Record Business Top Disco 50 chart on the week of August 3. It was still in the chart for the week of August 17. The following week it was at No. 52 on the Disco Bubbling Under chart. It was still in the Bubbling Under chart at No. 65 for the week of August 31.

The single debuted at no. 17 in the Twelve Inchers chart for the week of July 20. The following week there was no entry in the Twelve Inchers chart. Then the following week (August 3) it was back in the chart one more time at no. 19.

Chart summary 1981
Publication	Chart	Peak	Notes
Record Business	Disco Top 50	24	
Record Business	Twelve Inchers	17	
