= Sugar Cane (musical group) =

- Origin: Germany
- Genres: Disco, pop
- Years active: c. 1977–1979
- Labels: Ariola, Hansa, EMI, Sonopresse
- Past members: Reggie Tsiboe; Linda Taylor

Sugar Cane was a Eurodisco group with Latin disco and Caribbean musical style. They had several singles released in the late 1970s. They found greater success with their version of the Bobby Bloom hit "Montego Bay" which is what the group is more likely to be remembered for.

== Background ==
The lineup included Reggie Tsiboe and Linda Taylor. Tsiboe was already a recording artist and had composed both sides of his 1974 single, "Please Don't Bring Your Sister" which was credited to Reggie Seeboe and released on Cube Records. The single was actually reviewed by Ron McCreight for the April 27, 1974 issue of Record World. Calling it a most interesting single for many weeks, he also said that it deserved to be a world-wide smash. Taylor, a former housewife had been in a funk band called Sox for a period of time.

Carroll Thompson auditioned for the group at one stage and was a backing singer. In an interview for the Record Collector magazine, Thompson said that frank Farian had put the group together. At the audition she met a girl who turned out to be the niece of the legendary Jamaican producer, Leonard Chin.

Visually in performance and on record covers, the group was composed of three males and two females.

The group had good success with "Montego Bay" and followed up with their Caribbean-disco version of the Loggins and Messina song "Valhevala". This was also the first success that Linda Taylor encountered in her career.

== Career ==
A single "Coconut-Party" bw "Chilly Chilly Boo Boo" credited to the group was released on EMI 006-32 426 in October 1977. Both sides were composed by Ben Juris and Benny Lux. Juris handled the arrangements of both sides.

=== "Montego Bay" ===
The group recorded their version of the Bobby Bloom hit, "Montego Bay". It was produced by P. Bellotte and released on Ariola 7716. John Wishart gave the song a very good review in the August 12 issue of Record Mirror with Wishart saying that "Montego Bay" was such a good song that it could withstand any treatment. He said that in some ways it was an improvement on Bobby Bloom's 1970 hit and it was nice to hear men and women sharing vocals for a change. Their single was also reviewed in the August 19 issue of Record World. A Single Pick, the Latin disco element was called a perfect fit and the fitting together of the harmony vocals with the smooth instrumentation were noted. The August 19 issue of Music Week showed that the single was an ad on at Radio Orwell in Ipswich and Pat Gibson of Radio Blackburn had it as a hit pick.

According to the September 2 issue of Music Week, the single was now a breaker. It was also an add on at Beacon Radio in Wolverhampton. It was getting played in the US. It was shown by Cash Box in the September 9 issue that it was an add on at KDKO in Denver.

Sugar Cane appeared on Top of the Pops which was aired on 28 September. Other acts to appear on that same episode included Third World with "Now That We've Found Love", Lindisfarne with "Juke Box Gypsy" and Frankie Miller with "Darlin’".

Now in the charts and a hit, it had moved from no. 43 to no. 32 on the UK Disco Top 90 for the week of September 30, 1978. On the week of October 13 it debuted at no. 75 in the Radio & Record News National Top Singles chart. It also did the same in the Independent Record National Top 100 Singles chart. It was also on the Swansea Sound 257 playlist, the 208 Top 40 playlist, the Big L Disco Dozen playlist, the Radio Tees playlist, the Capital Radio 194 playlist, the Piccadilly 261 playlist, the Radio Clyde playlist, the Radio Trent playlist, and the 194 Radio Forth playlist. The following week it had dropped down to no 77 on both the Radio & Record News National Top Singles and Independent Record National Top 100 Singles charts.

It peaked at no. 13 on the Music Week Disco Top 40 chart on the week of October 21. It would spend five weeks on the main UK chart, peaking at no. 54. It was still in the Music Week Disco Top 40 chart at no. 36 on the week of November 18. The single had also been released in Italy on Dig It DG 1182. It became a dance hit for them there and for the week of February 17, 1979, it was at no. 19.

=== Further activities ===
They recorded the Loggins & Messina song "Vahevala" but the single was mis-spelt as "Valhevala". Backed with the Geoff Bastow, Keith Forsey, Pete Bellotte composition "Too Bad It Ain't Good", it was released on Ariola AHA 533 on February 2, 1979. It was reviewed in the March 9 issue of Radio & Record News. The song had been covered by many artists but had never been a hit and it kept popping up from time to time. The reviewer said it could do the same as the previous record, but was guarded in predicting success. There was to be expected interest following their previous hit. Tony Jasper commented in the February 24 issue of Music Week that the Caribbean disco number with its light and bright feel with the vocals and instrumentation, it should do well on afternoon programs and there could be a brief chart outing.

It was reported by Music Week that "Valhevala" was added to the playlist of Radio Victory in Portsmouth. Their single was now doing well on air. It was reported in the February 24, 1979 issue of Music Week that it was a hit pick on Radio Forth in Edinburgh, Swansea Sound in Swansea, BBC Scotland The record had been released in Australia that month on RCA Victor 103247.

As of September, 1979, the group was still on the Ariola / Hansa artist roster.

== Later years ==
Linda Taylor would become a member of the disco group Gonzales, and record as a solo artist having hits with "You and Me Just Started" and "Every Waking Hour". Reggie Tsiboe would later join Boney M in 1982. Later he would find work as an actor.

== Discography ==
Singles
Act	Release	Catalogue	Year	Notes
Sugar Cane	"Coconut Party" / " Chilly Chilly Boo Boo"	EMI 006-32 426	1977	
Sugar Cane	"Montego Bay" / "Topsy Turvy"	Hansa 15764 AT	1978	
Sugar Cane	"Valhevala" / "Too Bad It Ain't Good"	Hansa International 100 445	1979	

Various artists compilation appearances
Title	Track	Catalogue	Year	Notes
Super Disco Party 2	"Montego Bay"	Hansa 200 210–320	1978	album chart nl Peak: 18 / weeks: 7
Disco Night Fever	"Montego Bay"	Hallo RTL 38 141 8	1978	
20 Giganten Vol. 2	"Montego Bay"	Hansa 200 257–351	1978	
Disco Disco	"Montego Bay"	K-Tel BLP 7901	1979	
It's My Discothek Vol. 3	"Montego Bay"	Hansa 200 445–351	1979	
