= Be Like a Woman =

1979 song by Chris Rainbow

Single by Chris Rainbow

from the album White Trails
- A-side: "Love You Eternally"
- Released: April 2026
- Recorded: 1978–1979
- Studio: Scorpio Sound (Camden, London)
- Genre: Progressive pop
- Length: 4:15
- Label: EMI
- Songwriter: Chris Rainbow
- Producer: Chris Rainbow

Audio
- "Be Like a Woman" on YouTube

"Be Like a Woman" is a song by Scottish singer Chris Rainbow from his third solo studio album White Trails (1979). The song, which was written and produced by Rainbow, achieved widespread recognition in late 2025 after gaining traction on the video-sharing app TikTok, and posthumously became his first entry on the Billboard Hot 100, peaking at No. 92.

== Background and release ==
Rainbow's contract with Polydor Records terminated in 1978 after the release of his second solo studio album Looking Over My Shoulder (1977). Within a week, Rainbow signed with EMI and began work on his third studio album White Trails. The song was recorded at Scorpio Sound in Camden, London throughout 1978 and 1979, and features contributions from future-Alan Parsons Project collaborator Ian Bairnson and future Toto drummer Simon Phillips. The song was released as the fourth track on White Trails in September 1979, and subsequently as the B-side to "Love You Eternally".

== Legacy ==
Following the release of White Trails, Rainbow was subsequently dropped by EMI, and later embarked on a decade long collaboration with the Alan Parsons Project from 1979 to 1990. The song remained dormant, with Rainbow "never [appearing] on a Billboard chart during his lifetime as a solo artist". Over a decade after Rainbow's death from Parkinson's disease in 2015, the song experienced a surge in popularity on TikTok for its "near-proto-chillwave" sound. It was used in a wide variety of videos, including a trend in which users posted photos of numerous used glasses or candles accompanied by text, with phrases of things they enjoy.

== Commercial performance ==
As a result of its exposure on TikTok, the song rose from 18,000 to 66,000 weekly official on-demand streams in November 2025, according to Luminate. The number of streams significantly increased in early 2026, reaching over 2.5 million by the end of February, and later 3.4 million by the beginning of April.

The song debuted at No. 18 on the Billboard Hot Rock Songs chart and No. 22 on the Billboard Hot Rock & Alternative Songs chart on February 28, 2026, later peaking at No. 16 on the Hot Rock & Alternative Songs chart on May 2. The song later debuted at No. 94 on the Billboard Hot 100 on April 14. Along with a peak at No. 75 on the Canada Hot 100, the song peaked at No. 92 on the Hot 100 on May 2. The song also debuted at No. 84 on the UK Singles chart, and peaked at No. 82 on April 17. The song has amassed over 120 million streams on Spotify as of July 2026.

== Personnel ==
Credits adapted from the liner notes of White Trails.

=== Musicians ===
- Chris Rainbow – vocals
- Christy Thompson – backing vocals
- Linda Taylor – backing vocals
- Marylyn Bairnson – backing vocals
- Ian Bairnson – guitar
- Mart Jenner – guitar
- The Infamous Shug Barr – guitar
- Mo Foster – bass
- Pete Zorn – bass
- Simon Phillips – drums
- Max Middleton – Fender Rhodes, synthesizer
- Dick Morrissey – saxophone
- Dave Lawson – synthesizer

=== Technical ===
- Chris Rainbow – production
- Ray Hendriksen – engineering
- Steve Parker – additional engineering

== Charts ==
Chart performance for "Be Like a Woman"
Chart (2026)	Peak position
Canada Hot 100 (Billboard)	75
Ireland (IRMA)	67
UK Singles (Official Charts)	82
UK Independent Singles Breakers Chart (OCC)	15
US Billboard Hot 100	92
US Hot Rock & Alternative Songs (Billboard)	16

== Certifications ==
Region	Certification	Certified units/sales
New Zealand (RMNZ)	Gold	15,000^{‡}
^{‡} Sales+streaming figures based on certification alone.

== Release history ==
Region	Date	Format(s)	Label(s)	Ref.
Various	September 1979	LP; cassette	EMI	
Japan	February 19, 1993	CD	C.R.	
