= Body Shake =

"Body Shake (Instrumental)"

Song by T. C. Curtis
- B-side: "Body Shake (Vocal)"
- Recorded: 1981
- Label: Groove Production GP 112 T
- Songwriter: William Alexander Smith
- Producers: William Alexander Smith; Al Williams

Body Shake aka "Bodyshake" was a 1981 single for T. C. Curtis. It was released on the Groove Production label in the UK and was a hit for Curtis early in the following year.

== Background ==
The track was composed by William Alexander Smith aka T. C. Curtis. Smith co-produced it with Al Williams.

The song appears on the various artists compilation, The Best Of British Jazz-Funk Volume 2.

== Reception ==
It was released in the United States and Canada on the Quality and RFC labels, and a brief review in the United States music trade magazine, Record World by Brian Chin in his Disco File column. He referred to it as a bright hyper-electronic number. He noted the length and the few changes of both the vocal and instrumental versions. He also said it was "fast and punchy, like a new, poppier "War Dance".

== Airplay ==
The April 3, 1982 issue of Billboard showed that "Body Shake" was an add-on to the playlist of WKTU-FM in New York City. On the week of April 10, 1982, James Hamilton reported that "Body Shake" was getting played in the United States on New York urban contemporary radio.

== Charts ==
The record made its debut at no. 14 on the Record Business Twelve Inchers chart on the week of January 11. Also that week, it was on its fourth week in the magazine's Disco Top 50 chart. It had moved up from no. 45 to no. 23. On the week of February 1, and at week seven, it was at the peak position of no. 16. It spent a total of eleven weeks in the Disco Top 50 chart.

Chart summary
Country	Publication	Peak	Notes
UK	Record Business; Disco Top 50	16	
UK	Record Business; Twelve Inchers	12	
