= William A. Smith =

William A. Smith or William Alexander Smith may refer to:

- William Alden Smith (1859–1932), U.S. Representative and U.S. Senator from the U.S. state of Michigan
- William Alexander Smith (politician) (1828–1888), U.S. Representative from the U.S. state of North Carolina
- Sir William Alexander Smith (Boys' Brigade) (1854–1914), founder of the Boys' Brigade
- William Alexander Smith (boxer) (1904–1955), South African boxer
- William Alexander Smith, birth name of T. C. Curtis, UK-based Jamaican singer
- Amor De Cosmos (William Alexander Smith, 1825–1897), Canadian journalist and politician
- William Andrew Smith (1802–1870), president of Randolph-Macon College
- William Armstrong Smith, political researcher whose papers reside in the Richard B. Russell Library for Political Research and Studies
- William Arthur Smith (1918–1989), American artist
- William A. Smith (Iowa judge) (1870–1958), justice of the Iowa Supreme Court
- William A. Smith (Kansas judge) (1888-1968), Associate Justice of the Kansas Supreme Court

== See also ==
- William Smith (disambiguation)
