= Touchpaper =

Touchpaper or Touch-paper may refer to:

- Touchpaper, a slow-burning paper fuse treated with solution of potassium nitrate
- Touchpaper Television, part of RDF Media Group and producer of UK programmes such as Switch
- Touchpaper, a novel by Peter Tennant
- Touchpaper (album), a 1984 album by Claire Hamill
