= Groove Production =

British record label

- Founded: 1980
- Founder: Chris Palmer
- Status: Defunct
- Distributors: Pinnacle, PRT
- Genre: Disco, funk
- Country of origin: England
- Location: London

Groove Production was a record label formed by Chris Palmer. The majority of recordings were in the dance and disco genre. Artists to have their material released on the label include Bunny Brown, Cayenne, T. C. Curtis, The Evasions, K.I.D., Morrissey-Mullen, Surface Noise, and Linda Taylor. Hits that came though the label include "Body Shake", "(You're) In The Pocket", "You and Me Just Started", "Roberto Who?" and "Wikka Wrap" etc.

== Background ==
The founder of the label was Chris Palmer the owner of Groove Records in Soho's Greek Street.

Following what was described by Record Business as the runaway indie success of the song "Wikka Wrap", the label issued their first album in mid-1981 which was Roberto Who? by Cayenne.

The Groove Production recording artist Surface Noise was a pseudonym for Chris Palmer. The track "The Scratch" which is credited to his pseudonym is listed at no. 12 on the Classic Pop Top 20 80s pop instrumentals list in 2022. This was Palmer's first production for the label and he played most of the instruments on the recording.

== History ==
=== 1980 ===
Surface Noise's "The Scratch" was released on Groove Production GP 101 in May 1980. It was reviewed in the May 24, 1980 issue of Record Mirror. The prediction was that it was going to be huge. And on that week it had moved up from no. 84 to no. 50 in the Disco Top 90 chart.

It was noted by Record Mirror in the August 16 issue that Surface Noise's "Dancin' On a Wire" bw "Love Groove" was a breaker.

Bunny Brown recorded "Strawberry Letter 23" which was released in 12" vinyl format on Groove Production GP 103 in 1980.

=== 1981 ===
The Roberto Who? album by Cayenne was released on Groove Production GPLP 30 in June 1981. It featured Linda Taylor on vocals. Cayenne's single "Roberto Who?", credited to Cayenne featuring Linda Taylor debuted no. 30 in the Record Business Disco Top 50 chart on the week of July 20.

Music trade magazine Record Business had published their quarterly survey in their July 20, 1981 issue. The single "Wikka Wrap" was at no. 3 in the Top Disco / Soul Singles and no. 27 in the Top 30 Indie Singles.

Linda Taylor recorded the song "(You're) In The Pocket" which was released on a 12" single on Groove Production GP 109. It debuted at no. 48 in the Record Business Disco Top 50 chart on the week of September 21. On the week of October 5, it had moved up to no. 31.

=== 1982 ===
"Body Shake" by T. C. Curtis made its debut at no. 14 on the Record Business Twelve Inchers chart on the week of January 11. It was also at its fourth week in the magazine's Disco Top 50 chart and had moved up from no. 45 to no. 23.

It was noted in the February 8, 1982 issue of Record Business that Chris Palmer had returned to the UK from Midem where he had set up world-wide licensing deals for Linda Taylor's new album Taylor Made which hadn't yet been completed.

It was reported in the April 19, 1982, issue of Record Business that Groove Productions formerly known as Groove Records had stopped using Pinnacle as their distributor and were now using PRT. The first album to come through the new distributor for the 23rd of that month was the Taylor Made album.

Linda Taylor's "You and Me Just Started" did well for the label. It peaked at no. 8 in the Record Business Disco Top 50 on the week of May 24. It also peaked at no. 5 in the Twelve Inchers chart that week, It spent a total of eleven weeks in the Disco Top 50. It was also a success in the United States on the Dance / Disco Top 80 chart, spending a total of fourteen weeks on the chart, where it peaked at no. 13.

According to James Hamilton in the September 28 issue of Record Mirror, The Evasions were following up on their previous release with "The Passage". It was reviewed in the October 16 issue of Record Mirror. It was released on Groove Production GP 114 T in 12" format.
