= Cheyenne Township, Kansas =

Cheyenne Township, Kansas may refer to:

- Cheyenne Township, Barton County, Kansas
- Cheyenne Township, Lane County, Kansas

== See also ==
- List of Kansas townships
- Cheyenne Township (disambiguation)
