= Pete Jacobsen =

English jazz pianist

- Also known as: Peter Jacobsen
- Born: Peter Paul George Jacobsen; 16 May 1950; Newcastle upon Tyne, England, United Kingdom
- Origin: London, England, United Kingdom
- Died: 29 April 2002 (aged 51) London
- Genres: Jazz
- Occupation: Musician
- Instrument: Piano

Pete Jacobsen (16 May 1950 – 29 April 2002), also known as Peter Jacobsen, was an English jazz pianist.

== Early life and education ==
He was born Peter Paul George Jacobsen in Newcastle upon Tyne.

Having lost his sight as a baby, due to a growth behind the Optic nerve, he studied at the Worcester School for the Blind (now New College Worcester) and then formed his own trio, which was good enough to attract local television coverage. In 1969, he moved to London to study at the Royal Academy of Music. With a keen memory and perfect pitch (Absolute pitch), Jacobsen's lack of sight was no obstacle.

== Career ==
In London, Jacobsen began to play with saxophonists Barbara Thompson, Isotope's Gary Boyle, and Don Weller. He became a member of the jazz-fusion band Morrissey–Mullen, but it was not until the 1980s that he recorded with them--This Must Be The Place was released in 1985 and Happy Hour in 1988. Trumpeter Kenny Wheeler recommended Jacobsen for the piano chair with the Bobby Wellins Quartet. Jacobsen would perform on four of Wellins' albums: Live... Jubilation (1978), Dreams are Free (1979), ERCO Makes Light Work (1983) and Birds of Brazil (1989).

One of Jacobsen's most regular collaborators was Chris Biscoe, with whom he recorded the 1986 album The Chris Biscoe Sextet and Modern Alarms (1990). Jacobsen and Biscoe would often perform as a duet and recorded several BBC Jazz Club performances. When Jacobsen died, he and Biscoe were planning on forming a band featuring the songs of Lee Konitz.

He also played with American trombonist Jimmy Knepper, recording the 1980 album Primrose Path with Knepper, Dave Green and drummer Ron Parry. For this album, Jacobsen wrote the "Song for Keith". He would also write the song "Black Book" for the album Highly Committed Media Players which he recorded in 2000 with Larry Coryell, Steve Clarke, Jack Bruce, Chris Laurence, Laurence Cottle, Wolfgang Schmid and Ted Emmett.

During this time, Jacobsen, drummer Dave Barry and bassist Mick Hutton were the resident rhythm section at the Cambridge Modern Jazz Club. In 1988, Jacobsen recorded the album Eleven Years From Yesterday with the Ugandan jazz violinist Philipp Wachsmann, percussionist Trevor Taylor, the Brazilian bassist and cellist Marcio Mattos, and the guitarist Ian Brighton.

Jacobsen also regularly played with the saxophonists Robin Kenyatta, Alan Skidmore, Peter King, bassists Eberhard Weber and Paul Carmichael, and with the percussionist Chris Fletcher. He gave memorable solo recitals at the Sherborne Abbey Festival, and at the Brighton Jazz Club, where he was a regular performer. He toured with the Celtic-jazz band Cármina, and played on three of their albums--Still Between the Sun and the Moon (1993), Weather in the Heart (1995), and Love Like Angels (2000).

In 1994, Jacobsen released his only solo album Ever Onward. In 2001, with drummer Nic France and bassist Simon Woolf, he formed the Peter Jacobsen Trio; their only recording, On Your Marks (2001), was a live album, recorded at the Peterborough Jazz Club.

Through the 1990s, Jacobsen worked with Tim Whitehead's quartet and trio; he played on two of Whitehead's albums--Authentic (1991), and Silence Between Waves (1994). It was Whitehead who noted that Jacobsen spent much of his time in the East End of London, playing with unknown and/or struggling musicians and, as a result, never got the press attention he deserved.

== Death ==
It was also Whitehead with whom Jacobsen went on his final tour, a series of gigs at rural English arts centres. Their last show was at Althorpe, Lincolnshire, on Sunday 14 April 2002. By the time they returned to London, Jacobsen was clearly ill and Whitehead insisted that he see a doctor; Jacobsen died a few days later, at age 51.

In 2012, FMR Records released the compilation For Pete's Sake Volume 1. The album includes the song "1817", which Jacobsen wrote for Kenny Wheeler but had not been recorded.

Jacobsen's last recording was on Phil Burdett's See You Later, Forever, which was completed and released in 2003. The title refers to Jacobsen, and Burdett dedicated the album to him, with the notation "In Memoriam: Pete Jacobsen 1950-2002 A beautiful man & musician of exalted versatility & soul."

== Discography ==
- 1978 – Live... Jubilation (Bobby Wellins Quartet)
- 1979 – Dreams Are Free (Bobby Wellins Quartet)
- 1980 – Primrose Path (Jimmy Knepper)
- 1982 - The Pursuit of Accidents (Level 42)
- 1983 - ERCO Makes Light Work (Bobby Wellins Quartet)
- 1984 – Hi-Fly (Peter King with the Philippe Briand Trio)
- 1985 – This Must Be the Place (Morrissey–Mullen)
- 1986 – Chris Biscoe Sextet (Chris Bisoe Sextet)
- 1988 – Happy Hour (Morrissey–Mullen)
- 1988 – Eleven Years From Yesterday (Phil Wachsmann, Peter Jacobsen, Ian Brighton, Marcio Mattos and Trevor Taylor)
- 1989 – Birds of Brazil (Bobby Wellins Quintet with the Delmé Quartet)
- 1990 - * Modern Alarms (Chris Biscoe)
- 1991 – Authentic (Tim Whitehead Quartet)
- 1993 - Still Between the Sun and the Moon (with Cármina)
- 1994 – Silence Between Waves (Tim Whitehead Quartet)
- 1994 – Ever Onward (solo)
- 1995 - Weather in the Heart (with Cármina)
- 2000 – Highly Committed Media Players (Network)
- 2000 - Love Like Angels (with Cármina)
- 2001 - On Your Marks, Peter Jacobsen Trio (with Simon Woolf and Nic France)
- 2003 – See You Later, Forever – Phil Burdett (featured on organ and piano)
- 2012 - For Pete's Sake Volume 1 (Compilation), FMR Records
- 2024 - Homage To Caledonia (Bobby Wellins Sextet) (recorded live in the Autumn of 1979 - released September 13, 2024), Jazz In Britain

== See also ==
- List of blind musicians
- List of jazz pianists
- List of people from London
- List of people from Newcastle upon Tyne
- List of Royal Academy of Music people
