= One House Left Standing =

Studio album by Claire Hamill
- Released: 1972
- Recorded: Autumn 1971
- Studio: Island (London)
- Genre: Folk rock
- Length: 31:41
- Label: Island
- Producers: Chris Blackwell; John McCoy

Claire Hamill chronology
One House Left Standing (1972)	October (1973)

One House Left Standing is the debut studio album by the English singer-songwriter Claire Hamill, released in 1972. She was just 17 when she recorded it.

The album cover depicts Claire Hamill sitting on an old railway wheel in front of the Tees Transporter Bridge. The photograph was taken by Brian Cooke on the north side of the River Tees and was one of a series of photos featuring the bridge in the background.

== Track listing ==
All songs written by Claire Hamill and Mike Coles, except where noted.

1. "Baseball Blues" (Claire Hamill) – 4:30
2. "Man Who Cannot See Tomorrow's Sunshine" – 2:40
3. "Consummation" – 2:15
4. "River Song" – 4:30
5. "Where Are Your Smiles At" – 2:20
6. "When I Was a Child" (Hamill) – 2:11
7. "Urge for Going" (Joni Mitchell) – 6:45
8. "Flowers for Grandma" – 1:35
9. "Phoenix" – 2:40
10. "Smile Your Blues Away" (Hamill) – 2:15

== Personnel ==
- Claire Hamill – guitar, pipe organ, vocals
- Phil Bates – double bass
- Paul Buckmaster – cello, arrangements
- John Bundrick – keyboards
- Jack Emblow – accordion
- John Hawken – keyboards
- Aubrey Johnson – oboe
- Simon Kirke – drums
- David Lindley – guitar, mandolin
- John Martyn – guitar
- John Pigneguy – French horn
- Terry Reid – guitar, vocals
- Ray Warleigh – flute
- Tetsu Yamauchi – bass
- Richard Hewson - string arrangements

Technical

- John Burns - engineer, mixing
- Brian Cooke - cover photography

== Reception ==
Professional ratings
Review scores
Source	Rating
Allmusic	4/5 stars

The Allmusic review by Jo-Ann Greene awarded the album 4 stars and states "The entire set is carefully crafted, deftly arranged, and beautifully played, while Hamill shines throughout. The only complaint one can make is that she tries too much.".
