= Morrissey–Mullen =

British jazz-funk/fusion group

- Years active: 1970s - 1980s
- Labels: Harvest Records, Groove Production, Beggars Banquet
- Past members: Dick Morrissey; Jim Mullen

Morrissey–Mullen were a British jazz-funk/fusion group of the 1970s and 1980s.

Considered one of the most popular jazz groups in London, the band was led by Dick Morrissey on tenor and soprano saxes and flute, and Jim Mullen on guitar, who joined forces in 1975, playing together for sixteen years, during which they came to be known as "Mr Sax and Captain Axe" because of their hallmark call and response style between guitar and saxophone.

== History ==
The band began in New York City where Dick Morrissey and Jim Mullen were recording and touring with their mutual friends in the Average White Band and Herbie Mann.

Up (Atlantic, 1977) included Average White Band as a rhythm section, Luther Vandross and Cissy Houston on vocals, and New York session musicians. A six-week residency at Mikell's in New York City attracted Boz Scaggs, David Sanborn, Steve Gadd, Steve Ferrone, Richard Tee, George Benson, Ray Barretto, Michael Brecker, and Randy Brecker.

On their return to the United Kingdom, Morrissey–Mullen concentrated on the small-club/pub circuit, including a residency at The Half Moon, Putney for many years.

In 1979, Morrissey–Mullen recorded an instrumental version "Love Don't Live Here Anymore", originally a hit for Rose Royce, backed with a piece by Jim Mullen entitled "Don't You Worry" - released as a 12-inch single, EMI 12DIG 1001, this was significant in being the first non-classical 100% digitally recorded and mastered record released by EMI

Morrissey–Mullen's backing band included British jazz musicians such as Martin Drew, David Sheen, Chris Ainsworth, Tony Beard, Neil Wilkinson, John Mole, Clive Chaman, John McKenzie, Joe Hubbard, Trevor Barry, and Pete Jacobsen, John Critchinson, Martin Blackwell, Geoff Castle, and John Burch (with whom Dick Morrissey would form an octet in 1984). Although members of the band had included two session musicians from New Zealand, Frank Gibson Jr. on drums and Bruce Lynch on bass, the band was also a springboard for a generation of young British musicians, including Chris Fletcher on percussion, Henry Thomas on bass, Gary Husband on drums, Rob Burns on bass, Claire Hamill and Carol Kenyon on vocals (both on whom appeared with Dick Morrissey on the 1981 Jon & Vangelis album The Friends of Mr Cairo), Tessa Niles, Linda Taylor, and Noel McCalla.

Morrissey's failing health required too many visits to hospital for the band to be viable. When the band dissolved in 1988, Mullen and Morrissey continued meeting for jam sessions with what they called "Our Band", usually with the same musicians that had accompanied them in the past. They appeared at the 1991 Cork Jazz Festival in the Metropole Hotel in Cork, Ireland.

Morrissey died on 8 November 2000, aged 60, after many years fighting various forms of cancer.

== Discography ==
- 1976: Up (Embryo)
- 1979: Cape Wrath
- 1981: Badness – UK No. 43
- 1982: Life on the Wire – UK No. 47
- 1983: It's About Time – UK No. 95
- 1985: This Must Be the Place
- 1988: Happy Hour
