= Taylor Made (album) =

Studio album by Linda Taylor
- Released: 1982
- Label: Groove Production GPLP31
- Producer: Chris Palmer

Taylor Made was the 1982 debut album for English singer Linda Taylor. It got into the disco top ten in the UK. It also included her hit singles, "(You're) In the Pocket" and "You and Me Just Started".

== Background ==
As of early 1982, the album was in an uncompleted state. According to the February 8, 1982 issue of Record Business, Linda Taylor's album was unfinished. Chris Palmer of Groove Productions had come back to the UK from Midem. He had arranged world-wide licensing deals for her album Taylor Made. According to the magazine, recording was supposed to due for completion that week. A UK release was scheduled for 1st of April.

The album had the distinction of being the first of Groove Production's albums to come through the label's new distributor PRT after they had dropped their former distributor, Pinnacle.

It was released on Groove Production GPLP31. The songs on the album were, side A; "You and Me Just Started", "Sweet Fever", "Walking in the Sun" and "Don't Lose the Motion". Side B; "Do You Know What I Am", "Let Me Into Your Heart" and "(You're) In the Pocket". She was backed by Chris Palmer on bass and synthesizer, John McKenzie on bass, Jeff Dunne, Martin David, Pete Baron and Tony Beard on drums, Danny Schogger on electric piano, acoustic piano and syntheszer, John self on harmonica, Derek Lewis on percussion, Max Middleton on acoustic piano, Chris Hunter and Mel Collins on saxophones, Annie Whitehead on trombone, Guy Barker, Martin Drover and Steve Sidwell on trumpets. Backing vocals were provided by Taylor, Chrissie Dixon, Nick Curtis, Ray Shell, Sheila Worrall and Tessa Webb.

The track "(You're) In the Pocket" was an earlier hit, having charted in late 1981.

The single from the album, "You and Me Just Started" charted in the UK, making it to no. 8 on the Record Business Disco Top 50 chart, and to no. 5 on the Record Business Twelve Inchers chart. It was also a hit in the United States getting top no. 13 on the Billboard Dance / Disco Top 80 chart.

== Reception ==
In the Disco Dealer column of the May 10, 1982 issue of Record Business, the Chris Palmber production was one of the three potential monsters noted. It was referred to as an excellent debut set.

James Hamilton said the standout on the album was "Walking in the Sun". He referred to it as "superb gut-wrenching deep, deep soul". He also said "nothing else can approach the dance appeal of "You and Me Just Started" but also said that "Don't Lose the Motion" tries.

== Charts ==
For the week of 17 May 1982, her album Taylor Made made its debut at no. 7 in the Record Business Disco Bestsellers albums chart. It peaked at no. 6 on the week of May 31, and held that position for another week. It was at no. 15 on the week of June 21 then dropped off the following week. On the week of July 5, it was back in the album chart at no 16. It stayed in the chart for one more week with its final position of no. 18.

== Track listing ==
Taylor Made, Groove Production GPLP31
No.	Track	Composer	Time	Notes
A1	"You and Me Just Started"	C. Palmer, L. Taylor		
A2	"Sweet Fever"	C. Palmer, L. Taylor		
A3	"Walking in the Sun"	J. Barry		
B1	"Don't Lose the Motion"	C. Palmer, L. Taylor		
B2	"Do You Know What I Am"	Joe Fagin		
B3	"Let Me Into Your Heart"	Linda Taylor		
B4	"(You're) in the Pocket"	Robert Ahwai		
