= T. C. Curtis =

- Also known as: Terry Curtis, Meltdown
- Born: William Alexander Smith
- Occupations: Singer; producer; record label executive
- Instrument: Voice
- Labels: Hot Melt, Hot Melt Records, Groove Production, Romantic Records, Virgin Records
- Formerly of: Hip Street Crowd

T. C. Curtis is a UK based singer who had a string of chart hits during the 1980s. He is most likely remembered for his hits "Body Shake" and "You Should Have Known Better". In addition to his national hits on the UK singles chart, he has also had other hits on the dance, R&B, club and disco charts.

== Background ==
T. C. Curtis was born in Jamaica and emigrated to the UK at age 14. During the 1970s he had been playing in various gospel genre bands. In the 1980s, he was recording Dance club music.

Curtis has had five chart hits in the main UK charts from 1985 to 1988. They include "You Should Have Known Better", "Take It Easy", "Let's Make Love", "Slave of Love" and "Pack Up Your Things and Get Out of My Life".

== Career ==
Curtis composed and recorded the song "Body Shake" which he co-produced with Al Williams. It was released in the UK on the Groove Production label in 1981. It got a review in the United States by Brian Chin of Record World in the magazine's 13 March 1982, issue. And James Hamilton reported that it was getting played in the United States on New York urban contemporary radio. But in the UK is where the action happened. Spending a total of eleven weeks in the Record Business Disco Top 50 chart, it peaked at no. 16. It also got to no. 12 on the Record Business Twelve Inchers chart.

"You Should Have Known Better"

Curtis recorded the single, "You Should Have Known Better" which was released on the Hot Melt label (cat #VS 75)4 as well as Virgin VS 754. It debuted in the main UK chart on 16 February 1985. It also debuted in the Music Week Airplay Action Bubbling chart at no. 10 on the week of 23 February 1985. It was also at no. 11 on the UK Club Play Chart that week, and at week three, it was at no. 10 on the Music Week Disco chart. It spent five weeks in the main chart, peaking at no. 50.

Further activities

Curtis' single, "Slave of Love" entered the UK chart on 27 September 1986. It spent three weeks in the chart, peaking at no. 88. It would enter the chart briefly again the following year for one week, peaking at no. 95.

It was reported in the R&B Report magazine (issue 2 - 15 October 1987) that the single, "Jacko" by T. C. Curtis and T. Jam had been on the Top 60 U.K. R&B Singles chart for two weeks. It had moved up from no. 49 to no. 28.
