= Voices (Claire Hamill album) =

Studio album by Claire Hamill
- Released: 1986
- Studio: Coda Landscape
- Genres: New-age; dream pop
- Length: 42:02
- Label: Blueprint
- Producer: Claire Hamill

Claire Hamill chronology
Touchpaper (1984)	Voices (1986)	Love in the Afternoon (1988)

Professional ratings
Review scores
Source	Rating
AllMusic	3/5 stars

Voices is the sixth studio album by the English singer-songwriter Claire Hamill, released in 1986 by Blueprint Records. The title refers to the fact that the album's mostly-instrumental music is entirely a capella, created by sampling and multi-tracking Hamill's voice.

== Track listing ==
All songs written by Claire Hamill.

1. "Awaken...Larkrise" - 3.59
2. "Tides" - 4:34
3. "Moss" - 3:08
4. "Afternoon in a Wheatfield" - 5:04
5. "Stars" - 2.58
6. "Leaf Fall" - 4:32
7. "Mist on the Ridge" - 4:19
8. "Harvest" - 3:29
9. "Icicle Rain" - 5:10
10. "Sleep" - 4:49

== Personnel ==
- Claire Hamill - guitar, keyboards, vocals, samples, loops, production
