= You and Me Just Started =

Single by Linda Taylor

from the album Taylor Made
- B-side: "You and Me Just Started" (club mix)
- Released: April 30, 1982
- Label: GPL GP 317
- Songwriters: Chris Palmer; Linda Taylor
- Producer: Chris Palmer

Linda Taylor singles chronology
"(You're) In the Pocket" (1981)	"You and Me Just Started" (1982)	"Every Waking Hour" (1986)

"You and Me Just Started" is a song by English singer Linda Taylor. It became a hit single for her in the UK in 1982 as well as in the US.

== Background ==
An ad appeared in the 3 May 1982 issue of UK music trade magazine Record Business informing readers that Linda Taylor's new single from her album Taylor Made, "You and Me Just Started" was a hit and it was available in 7" format on GP 317 and 12: format on GP 3112. It was available through PRT Distribution or Groove Production.

Brian Chin mentioned in his Dance Trax column for Billboard that the Prelude record label had a successful import run with the UK label Groove and would release "You and Me Just Started" in the US.

It is on the RVA Mag 039: Body Talk playlist.

== Reception ==
In his January 30, 1982 "Odds ‘N’ Bods" column, James Hamilton gave a brief review of Linda Taylor's album which was still in the early stages, and in what he described by as an incomplete rough mix, he said that every cut was dripping with class and the ultimate killer was likely to be "You and Me Just Started". On the week of April 24, Hamilton mentioned the single again in his column, calling Cris Palmer's production an "excellent chunkily bumping 114bpm 12in staccato lurcher full of great little twiddly bits". He also mentioned the influence from Chic's song "Good Times" and that DJs could craftily mix Chic in the break near the end of the song.

== Charts ==
=== UK ===
For the week of April 26, 1982 "You and Me Just Started" made its debut in the Record Business Disco Bubbling Under chart at no. 56. The following week saw its debut at no. 24 in the Record Business Disco Top 50 chart on the week of May 3, 1982. It also debuted at no. 20 in the Record Business Twelve Inchers chart. On its fourth week, the week of May 24, it peaked at no. 8 in the Disco Top 50. It also peaked at no. 5 in the Twelve Inchers chart that week, with the last entry in that chart at no. 9 on the week of June 14. It spent a total of eleven weeks in the Disco Top 50.

=== US ===
For the week ending 19 June 1982, her single "You and Me Just Started" made its debut in the Billboard Dance / Disco Top 80 chart at no. 52. There was a significant response to the record, and it was at no. 48 the following week. On the week ending August 7, with a significant response to the single, it had moved up from 25 to 19. On the week ending August 28, it was at its second week at peak position no. 13. It spent a total of fourteen weeks in the chart with its last entry at 73 on the week ending September 18.

Chart summary
Country	Publication	Peak position	Notes
UK	Record Business Disco Bubbling Under	56	
UK	Record Business Disco Top 50	8	
UK	Record Business Disco Twelve Inchers	5	
UK	Record Business; RB Quarterly Chart Survey; Disco Singles	15	
US	Billboard Dance / Disco Top 80	13	
