= Claire Hamill =

English musician

- Born: Josephine Claire Hamill; 4 August 1954 (age 72); Port Clarence, County Durham, England
- Genres: Folk rock; new-age; dream pop; progressive rock; jazz fusion
- Occupation: Singer-songwriter
- Instruments: Vocals; guitar
- Labels: Island; Konk
- Formerly of: Transporter
- Website: clairehamill.co.uk

Josephine Claire Hamill (born 4 August 1954) is an English singer-songwriter. She has collaborated with Wishbone Ash and Yes's Steve Howe in addition to her solo career.

== Life and career ==
Josephine Claire Hamill was born on 4 August 1954 in Port Clarence, County Durham. She has been active in the music business since age 17. In 1971, she was launched as one of Britain's first female singer-songwriters. She has been compared to Joni Mitchell by several commentators.

Shortly following the release of her debut studio album, One House Left Standing (1972), Hamill went on her first UK tour, supporting John Martyn with whom she also had a brief romantic relationship. She performed at the Concert 10 festival in the United States, July 1972, before a crowd of 200,000. By 1973, she had toured the United States with Procol Harum and Jethro Tull, and returned to Britain to record her next studio album, October (1973), at Manor Studio in Oxfordshire. She then toured with King Crimson.

In 1973, she met Ray Davies of the Kinks, who signed her to his Konk label for her third studio album Stage Door Johnnies. She toured America for the second time that year and went on another UK tour supporting Gilbert O'Sullivan. In addition, she recorded what would be her final studio album of the 1970s and the second one for Konk, Abracadabra (1975).

In 1979, she provided lead vocals on the song "Look Over Your Shoulder" on Steve Howe's second solo studio album The Steve Howe Album. In the early 1980s she worked with Wishbone Ash, appearing as a guest performer on their studio albums Just Testing (1980) and Number the Brave (1981) and joining the group for their 1981–82 tour. She returned as a guest on Bare Bones in 1999.

In 1980, she released a single called "First Night in New York", which gained favourable reviews. She formed a group, Transporter (which took its name from Tees Transporter Bridge), which released one single.

In 1981, she appeared on the Jon and Vangelis studio album The Friends of Mr Cairo and also sang with British jazz/funk/fusion group Morrissey–Mullen, appearing on their fourth studio album Life on the Wire (1982). In 1983, Hamill recorded a cover version of Gene Pitney's "24 Hours from Tulsa", produced by the American musician Richard Niles. Another single, "If You Would Only Talk to Me", suffered from a lack of radio exposure.

By the mid-1980s, Hamill had reinvented herself as a new-age artist, which gained her commissions from the BBC and Channel 4. Her first studio album of the 80s, Touchpaper (1984), was followed a year later by Voices, which featured all her work. Her music was used for the five-part BBC1 series Domesday, broadcast in November and December 1986. Four tracks ("Glastonbury (Jerusalem)", "Tides", "Spring: Awaken Lark Rise" and "Stars") were issued as the Domesday EP on Coda Records, a label featuring many new-age artists and run by her then-husband Nick Austin.

After the next studio album, Love in the Afternoon, she recorded a version of Johann Pachelbel's Canon in both instrumental and vocal versions, the latter featuring her own words as "Someday We Will All Be Together". Both this and the Voices album were used extensively by Channel 4 for a series of music videos collectively titled The Art of Landscape and shown every morning in the early 1990s. The video for the instrumental version of Canon, with scenes of Antarctic penguins, was voted by viewers as the favourite.

In 1992, Hamill went to live in Hastings, found a new partner in Andrew Warren, and later cut a new studio album called Summer at the end of the decade. Since then, she has released The Lost & the Lovers and a compilation album. Her song "You Take My Breath Away" from The Lost & the Lovers was previously covered by Tuck & Patti on 1988's Tears of Joy and that version caught the attention of American singer Eva Cassidy, whose recording of the track reached No. 54 on the UK singles chart in October 2003.

In 2009, she supported John Lees' Barclay James Harvest on their UK tour. Since 2013, she has been a member of the Yes tribute band Fragile, in the role of lead vocalist.

In August 2025, Hamill released the studio album Troubadour, produced and recorded with musician and producer Sonny Flint, who also played drums and contributed other instrumentation. The project also features guitarist Sean Elliott as a key collaborator, alongside guest contributions from Karl J. Goldring, Ali Paxton, Chris Barrett, and Pete Billings. Following the release, Hamill is touring with a full band to promote the album.

== Discography ==
- One House Left Standing (1971)
- October (1973)
- Stage Door Johnnies (1974)
- Abracadabra (1975)
- Touchpaper (1984)
- Voices (1986)
- Love in the Afternoon (1988)
- Summer (1997)
- The Lost & the Lovers (2004)
- The Minor Fall the Major Lift: the Best of Josephine Claire Hamill (2007)
- The Meeting of the Waters (2012)
- When Daylight Arrives (2015)
- Over Dark Apples (2019)
- A Pocket Full of Love Songs (2022)
- Travelling Light: the Best of Josephine Claire Hamill – Vol 2 (2025)
- Troubadour (2025)
- A House Among the Trees (2026)
