= Badness =

Studio album by Morrissey–Mullen
- Released: 1981
- Genre: Jazz fusion
- Label: Beggars Banquet
- Producer: Chris Palmer

Morrissey–Mullen chronology
Love Don't Live Here Anymore (1979 EP) (1979)	Badness (1981)	Life on the Wire (1982)

Professional ratings
Review scores
Source	Rating
Allmusic	3/5 stars

Badness is the third album released by British jazz fusion duo Morrissey–Mullen. Released in 1981, it entered the UK Album Charts on 18 July 1981, eventually reaching no. 43.

== Track listing ==
1. "Do Like You"
2. "Dragonfly"
3. "Stay Awhile"
4. "Blue Tears"
5. "Badness"
6. "Pass The Music On"
7. "Slipstream"

== Personnel ==
- Dick Morrissey – tenor sax, soprano sax, flute
- Jim Mullen – guitar
- John Critchinson – keyboards
- Clive Chaman – bass guitar
- Chris Ainsworth – drums
- Chris Fletcher – percussion
- Linda Taylor – vocals
