= You Should Have Known Better =

1985 song by T. C. Curtis

Song by T. C. Curtis
- B-side: "You Should Have Known Better (Instrumental)"
- Recorded: 1985
- Length: 6:50
- Label: 7"; Virgin, Hot Melt VS 754 12"; Virgin, Hot Melt VS 754-12
- Songwriter(s): William Alexander Smith
- Producer(s): William Alexander Smith

You Should Have Known Better was a 1985 single by UK singer-songwriter, T. C. Curtis. It became a hit for him that year, spending more than a month in the UK singles chart. It also registered in the Top Disco & Dance Singles, Airplay Action and Club Play charts.

== Background ==
The backing on the song is by UK group Galaxy.

The song is about a man who is leaving his woman. After repeatedly forgiving her, his patience has run out. He tells her to stop begging him to stay and that she should have known better. His mind is made up and he is leaving.

The song was released in early February, 1985 on Hot Melt 12 TC.003 but then later on Virgin, Hot Melt VS 754.

It was sampled by Chris Carrier and Jef K for the 2009 song "Morning" and by Space Ranger for the 2010 song "Superstring".

== Reception ==
David Hamilton of Radio 2 had "You Should Have Known Better" as the record of the week for the week of February 9, 1985. According to the February 23 issue of Music Week, the song had been a hot number in the clubs for several weeks and it had been recently been picked up by the Virgin record label.

== Airplay ==
It was noted in the March 2 issue of Music Week that "You Should Have Known Better", a new entry for the previous week now was on the B list for the majority of the fifteen playlists for the week of March 2. However, along with Theme From Shaft by Eddy & The Soul Band, "(I Guess) It Must Be Love" by Thelma Houston etc., it was on Radio London's A list.

== Chart ==
"You Should Have Known Better" made its debut at number 36 in the Music Week Top Disco & Dance Singles chart on the week of February 9, 1985. It debuted in the UK singles chart on February 16, 1985. It also made its debut at number 5 in the Radio 2 section of the Music Week Airplay Action chart, and at number 76 in the Music Week The Next 25 chart that week. It debuted in the Music Week Airplay Action Bubbling chart at number 10 on the week of February 23, 1985. It was also at number 11 on the UK Club Play Chart that week, and at week three, it was at number 10 on the Music Week Disco chart.

It spent a total of five weeks in the UK Singles chart, peaking at number 50.
