= It's About Time (Morrissey–Mullen album) =

Studio album by Morrissey–Mullen
- Released: 1983
- Genre: jazz fusion
- Label: Beggars Banquet
- Producer: Richard Niles

Morrissey–Mullen chronology
Life on the Wire (1982)	It's About Time (1983)	After Dark (1983)

Professional ratings
Review scores
Source	Rating
Allmusic	3/5 stars

It's About time is the sixth album released by British jazz fusion duo Morrissey–Mullen. It reached position 95 in the UK album charts in 1983.

The album was produced by Richard Niles, who also wrote some of the songs.

The title track is in tribute to the US saxophonist Teddy Edwards who had recently had a "duel" with Dick Morrissey at London's 100 Club.

== Track listing ==
1. "Stop and Look Around"
2. "It's About Time"
3. "Ounce of Bounce"
4. "So so Fine"
5. "Ol' Sax and Captain Axe"
6. "Bladerunner"
7. "Why Does It Always Happen to Me?"
8. "I Pull the Strings"
9. "Do I Do"
10. "Above the Clouds"

== Personnel ==
- Dick Morrissey - tenor saxophone
- Jim Mullen - guitar
- Tessa Niles - vocals
- Joe Hubbard - bass
- Neil Wilkinson - drums
- Chris Fletcher - percussion
- Damon Butcher - keyboards
