= Stage Door Johnnies (album) =

Studio album by Claire Hamill
- Released: 1974
- Recorded: September 1974
- Studio: Konk (London)
- Genre: Folk-rock
- Length: 36:32
- Label: Konk
- Producer: Ray Davies

Claire Hamill chronology
October (1973)	Stage Door Johnnies (1974)	Abracadabra (1975)

Stage Door Johnnies is the third studio album by the English singer-songwriter Claire Hamill, released in 1974.

== Track listing ==
All tracks composed by Claire Hamill; except where indicated

1. "We Gotta Get out of This Place" (Barry Mann, Cynthia Weil) - 3:18
2. "Oh Daddy (Blues) (You Don't Have No Mamma at All)" (Ed Herbert, William Russell) - 3:42
3. "All the Cakes She Baked Him" - 3:20
4. "Trying to Work It Out" - 3:32
5. "Geronimo's Cadillac" (Michael Martin Murphey, Charles John Quatro) - 4:24
6. "Something to Believe In" (Steve Miller) - 4:08
7. "You Know How Ladies Are" - 2:44
8. "You Take My Breath Away" - 2:36
9. "Go Now" (Larry Banks, Milton Bennett) - 3:32
10. "Luck of the Draw" - 3:12
11. "Stage Door Johnnies" - 2:04

== Personnel ==
- Claire Hamill - guitar, keyboards, vocals
- Phil Palmer - lead electric guitar
- Roy Neve - guitar
- Nick South, Paul Westwood, Phil Chen - bass
- Dave Rowberry - keyboards
- Clem Cattini, Jim Frank, Neil McBain - drums
- Laurie Brown - trumpet
- Ray Davies - producer, backing vocals
- Diz Disley - guitar on "Oh Daddy"
- Tim Hinkley - keyboards on "Stage Door Johnnies"
- Alan Holmes - flute
- Lew Warburton - string arrangements

Technical

- Roger Beale - engineer
