= Sleeveface =

Internet phenomenon

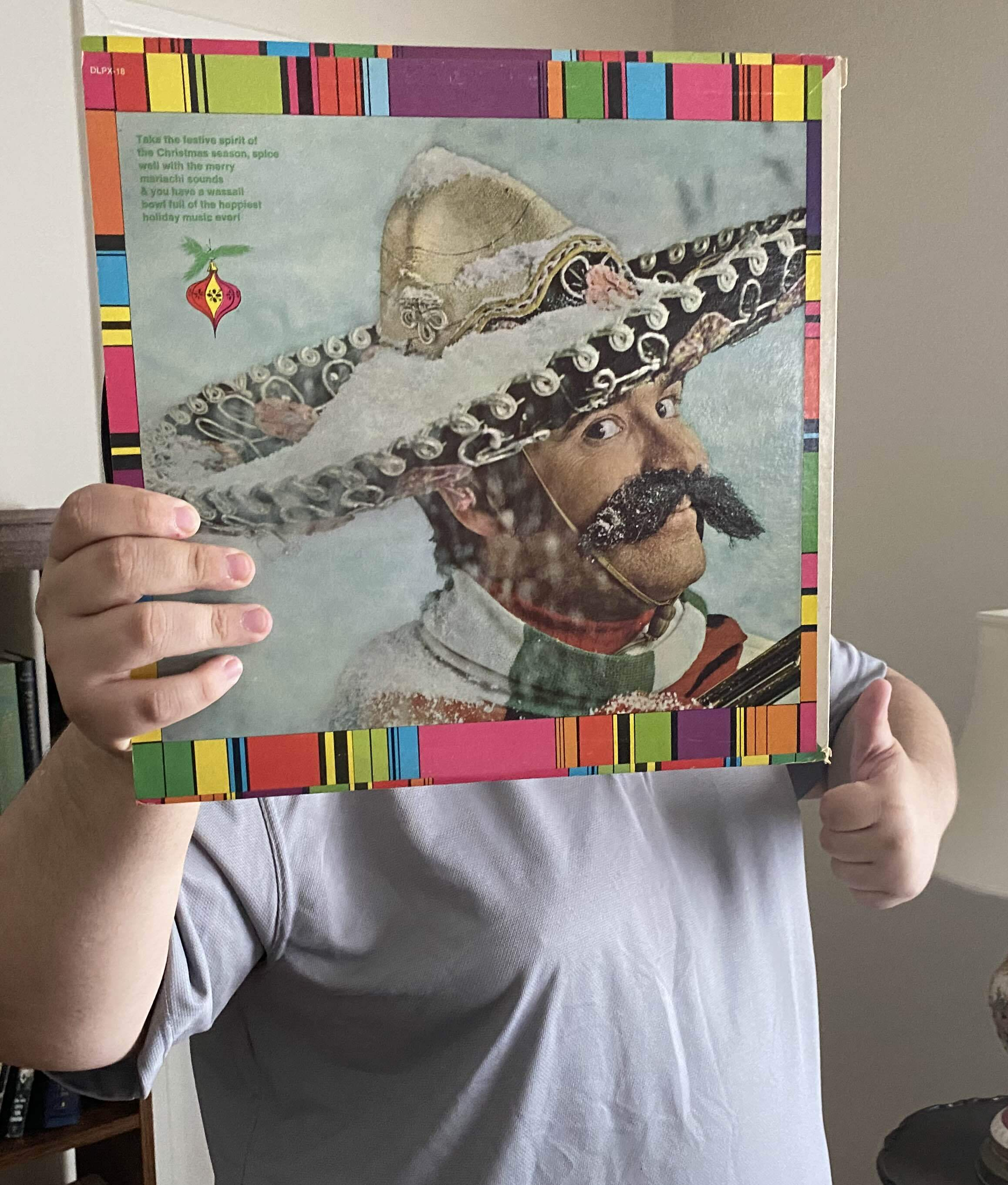
An example of a sleeveface photograph.

Sleeveface was an internet phenomenon wherein one or more persons obscured or augmented body parts with images on record sleeves or album covers, causing an illusion. Sleeveface became popular on social networking sites in the late 2000s.

The precise origin of the concept is unknown. A collection of photographs was posted online at Waxidermy.com in early 2006, though earlier examples of 'sleevefacing' include a Mad Magazine cover and a sketch on The Adam and Joe Show with Gary Numan holding a record sleeve to his face. Other cases include John Hiatt's 1979 Slug Line album on which he is holding a sleeve (showing his face) in front of his face and the back of the 1982 album Picture This by Huey Lewis and the News, where Huey is holding the front side of the album (showing his face) in front of his face. The artwork for J Rocc's 12" single 'Play This (One)' features men holding various LP sleeves over their faces.

The term 'sleeveface' was coined in April 2007 by Cardiff resident Carl Morris after pictures were taken of him and his friends holding record sleeves to their faces whilst DJing in a Cardiff bar. His friend John Rostron posted them on the internet and created a group on the nascent Facebook social networking site. From this point, the craze started to become more widely known.

Sleeveface contributors regularly held sleeveface parties across the world, and contributors have helped organise sleeveface workshops for children. One such workshop took place at the National Museum Cardiff in November 2008 as part of the city's annual Sŵn Festival.
