= Chayanne (disambiguation) =

Chayanne (born 1968) is a Puerto Rican singer.

Chayanne may also refer to:

- Chayanne (1987 album)
- Chayanne (1988 album)
- Puerto Rico Highway 203, also known as Chayanne Expressway

== See also ==
- Cheyenne (disambiguation)
