= Cayenne (disambiguation) =

Cayenne is the capital of French Guiana.

Cayenne may also refer to:

- Cayenne pepper
- Cayenne (mascot), a "spirit leader" of the Louisiana Ragin' Cajuns
- "Cayenne" (song), by the Beatles
- Porsche Cayenne, a luxury SUV manufactured by Porsche
- Cayenne, a British band known for the 1981 song "Roberto Who..?"

Software:

- Apache Cayenne
- Cayenne (programming language)

== Other ==
- Isle de Cayenne, island in French Guiana
