= Abracadabra (Claire Hamill album) =

Studio album by Claire Hamill
- Released: 1975
- Recorded: 1975
- Studio: Konk (London)
- Genre: Folk-rock
- Length: 38:33
- Label: Konk
- Producers: Phil McDonald; Claire Hamill

Claire Hamill chronology
Stage Door Johnnies (1974)	Abracadabra (1975)	Touchpaper (1984)

Abracadabra is the fourth studio album by thebEnglish singer-songwriter Claire Hamill, released in 1975. It was more rocky as a result, probably, of being influenced by the bands she was supporting on tour, such as King Crimson and Traffic. She used her American band for the backing tracks and supplemented them with guitarist Phil Palmer, Ray Davies's nephew.

== Track listing ==
All tracks composed by Claire Hamill; except where indicated

1. "Rory" - 2:50
2. "Forbidden Fruit" - 3:00
3. "One Sunday Morning" - 3:30
4. "I Love You So" (Paul Rodgers, Simon Kirke) - 3:16
5. "For Sailors" - 4:22
6. "Jamaica" (Traditional; arranged by Claire Hamill) - 2:14
7. "Under a Piece of Glass" - 3:11
8. "You Dear" (Ian Anderson) - 3:18
9. "Maybe It Is" - 4:00
10. "In So Deep" - 3:51
11. "Celluloid Heroes" (Ray Davies) - 5:00

== Personnel ==
- Claire Hamill - guitar, keyboards, vocals
- Phil Palmer - guitar
- Phil Chen - bass; ska guitar on "Jamaica"
- John Hartmann - keyboards
- Gary Ray - drums
- Mel Collins - soprano saxophone on "Forbidden Fruit"; brass arrangement
- Vicki Brown, Doreen Chanter - backing vocals on "I Love You So" and "Jamaica"
- Jean Roussel - piano on "Under a Piece of Glass", congas and shaker on "One Sunday Morning", tambourine on "In So Deep"; orchestral arrangements
- Café Society (Tom Robinson, Raphael Doyle, Hereward Kaye) - vocals on "One Sunday Morning", "Jamaica" and "Celluloid Heroes"

Technical

- Phil McDonald - producer, engineer
- Robin Ayling - coordination
