= October (Claire Hamill album) =

Studio album by Claire Hamill
- Released: 1973
- Recorded: October 1972
- Studios: The Manor (Shipton-on-Cherwell, England); Morgan (London)
- Genre: Folk-rock
- Length: 34:29
- Label: Island
- Producer: Paul Samwell-Smith

Claire Hamill chronology
One House Left Standing (1971)	October (1973)	Stage Door Johnnies (1974)

Professional ratings
Review scores
Source	Rating
AllMusic	4/5 stars

October is the second studio album by the English singer-songwriter Claire Hamill, released in 1973. Hamill has identified the subject of the track "Speedbreaker" as being John Martyn with whom she had an affair.

== Track listing ==
All tracks composed by Claire Hamill; except where indicated

1. "Island" (Steve Smith) - 3:21
2. "To the Stars" - 2:03
3. "Please Stay Tonight" - 3:02
4. "Wall to Wall Carpeting" - 2:22
5. "Speedbreaker" - 3:12
6. "I Don't Get Any Older" (Mike Coles, Hamill) - 2:32
7. "Warrior of the Water" - 2:56
8. "The Artist" - 2:39
9. "Baby What's Wrong (With You)" (Jimmy Reed) - 4:30
10. "Sidney Gorgeous" - 1:56
11. "Crying Under the Bedclothes" - 3:37
12. "Peaceful" - 2:19

== Personnel ==
- Claire Hamill - vocals, guitar, piano
- Tim Smith, Wayne Perkins - guitar, vocals
- Pat Donaldson - electric bass
- Chris Laurence - bass
- Steve Smith - keyboards, vocals
- Jean Roussel - piano
- Alan White - drums, percussion
- Gerry Conway - drums
- Henry Spinetti - congas
- Nick Harrison - string arrangements
- Paul Samwell-Smith, song arrangements Claire Hamill

Technical

- Barry Hammond, Simon Heyworth - engineer
- John B. McCoy, Tony Dimitriades - coordination
- Patrick Lichfield - photography
