= Life on the Wire =

Studio album by Morrissey–Mullen
- Released: 1982
- Studio: Scorpio Sound, London, England
- Genre: Jazz-funk
- Label: Beggars Banquet
- Producer: Chris Palmer

Morrissey–Mullen chronology
Badness (1981)	Life on the Wire (1982)	It's About Time (1983)

Singles from Life on the Wire
- 1. "Life on the Wire" Released: 1982; 2. "Come and Get Me" Released: 1982

Professional ratings
Review scores
Source	Rating
AllMusic	2/5 stars

Life on the Wire is the fourth studio album by British jazz-funk duo Morrissey–Mullen, released in 1982 by Beggars Banquet Records. It peaked at No. 47 in the UK Albums Chart.

== Track listing ==
Side one

1. "Life on the Wire" (Claire Hamill, Jim Mullen) – 5:19
2. "Takin' Time" (John Critchinson) – 5:22
3. "Face of a Child" (Hamill, Mullen) – 5:55
4. "Come and Get Me" (Hamill, Mullen) – 4:37

Side two

5. "Brazil Nut" (Alan Gorrie) – 5:17
6. "Ships that Pass in the Night" (Hamill, Mullen) – 5:04
7. "Making Waves" (Critchinson) – 5:20
8. "Running Out of Time" (Hamill, Dick Morrissey) – 4:38

== Personnel ==
Credits are adapted from the Life on the Wire liner notes.

- Dick Morrissey — tenor and soprano saxophones; flute
- Jim Mullen — guitar
- Claire Hamill — vocals
- Carol Kenyon — vocals
- Tony Beard — drums
- Chris Fletcher — percussion
- John McKenzie — bass
- John Critchinson — keyboards
- Danny Schogger — synthesizer

== Charts ==
Chart (1982)	Peak position
UK Albums (OCC)	47
