= The Evasions =

British disco band

- Genres: Novelty/rap
- Years active: 1981–96
- Labels: Groove Production
- Past members: Graham de Wilde; Nigel Martinez
- Website: www.theevasions.com

The Evasions were a novelty band that had a UK hit single in 1981.

== History ==
The Evasions consisted of songwriter Adrian Sear, producer Nigel Martinez, and television music composer Graham de Wilde. For the single, de Wilde performed an impersonation of television presenter and broadcaster Alan Whicker, purportedly analysing the dance music scene in Whicker's trademark detached anthropological style. The backing included samples of "Good Times" by Chic and "Funkin' for Jamaica" by Tom Browne.

Released on the Groove Productions label, based out of the Groove Records shop in Soho, under the title "Wikka Wrap" in June 1981, the song became a surprise hit, with The Evasions performing the track on Top of the Pops on 25 June; ultimately it peaked at no. 20 in the UK singles charts for the week ending 4 July 1981.

The Evasions had one follow-up single - "Jock's Rap", this time being a parody of "The Message" by Grandmaster Flash and the Furious Five

The track gained an unexpected afterlife in 1996 when Coolio sampled it - including de Wilde's vocals - on the single "1, 2, 3, 4 (Sumpin' New)". As a result de Wilde re-interpreted the single under the title "1, 2, 3, For Real" on the SMP label in 1996.

Shortly after "Wikka Wrap" became a hit, Sear and de Wilde worked with Whicker on Whicker's World (for which de Wilde had written the theme), and found that Whicker "took our parody very well. He was a genuinely charming man."
