= Record sleeve =

Protective lining of vinyl records

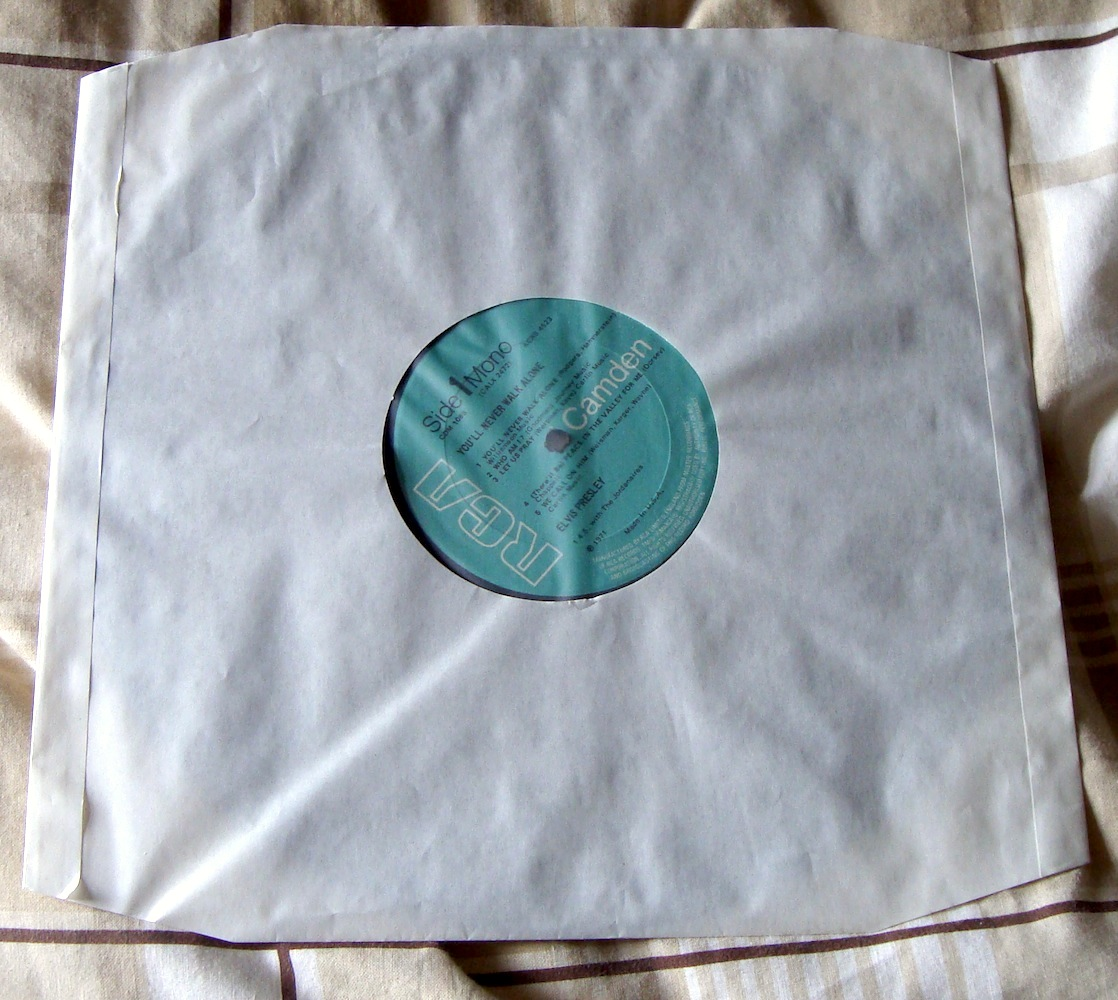
LP in an antistatic Record Dust Sleeve

A record sleeve is the outer covering of a vinyl record. Alternative terms are dust sleeve, album liner and liner.

The term is also used to denominate the outermost cardboard covering of a record, i.e. the record jacket or album jacket.

The record jacket is extensively used to design and market a recording, as well as to additionally display general information on the record as artist name, titles list, title length etc. if no opening presents a readable label.

The terms liner notes, sleeve notes are used to refer to this label, jacket information.

Sleeves were originally printed on simple cardboard. British manufacturers Garrod and Lofthouse patented a "wrap around" sleeve design commonly seen on LPs in the 1960s.

== See also ==
- Album cover
- Cover art
- Sleeveface
