= This Must Be the Place (album) =

Studio album by Morrissey–Mullen
- Released: 1985
- Genre: Jazz rock
- Label: Coda
- Producer: Jim Mullen, Nick Sykes

Morrissey–Mullen chronology
| After Dark (1983) | This Must Be the Place (1985) | Happy Hour (1988) |

This Must Be the Place is a 1985 album by British jazz rock duo Morrissey–Mullen.

== Track listing ==
1. "A Tear for Crystal"
2. "Mean Time"
3. "This Must Be the Place"
4. "With You"
5. "Southend Pierre"
6. "Visions"
7. "All I Want to Do"

== Personnel ==
- Dick Morrissey - saxes
- Jim Mullen - guitar
- Noel McCalla - vocals
- Chris Fletcher - percussion
- Neal Wilkinson - drums
- Pete Jacobsen - keyboards
- Trevor Barry - bass
