= Cheyenne High School =

Cheyenne High School may refer to:

- Cheyenne High School (North Las Vegas, Nevada)
- Cheyenne High School (Cheyenne, Wyoming), former high school, listed on the National Register of Historic Places
- Cheyenne Central High School, Cheyenne, Wyoming
- Cheyenne East High School, Cheyenne, Wyoming
- Cheyenne South High School, Cheyenne, Wyoming
- Cheyenne Mountain High School, Colorado Springs, Colorado
- Cheyenne Mountain Charter Academy, Colorado Springs, Colorado
