= Linda Taylor (singer) =

- Occupation: Singer
- Instrument: Voice
- Years active: 1970s–present
- Labels: Groove Production, Prelude Records, Unidisc, Nightmare Records, ZYX Records, Almighty Records, HTF Records
- Formerly of: Sugar Cane, Gonzalez, Street Angels, The Noisettes, The Secret Police Choir, Threshold, The Softrock

Linda Taylor is a performing singer, recording artist and songwriter. She had success with her hits with "(You're) in the Pocket", "You and Me Just Started" and "Every Waking Hour". She also sang lead on the hit "Roberto Who?" which was credited to Cayenne featuring Linda Taylor. She was once a member of Gonzalez. She is also one of the UK's top session singers. Her career has seen her working with acts such as Morrissey–Mullen.

== Background ==
Linda Taylor is a session singer who has been active since the 1970s. Bands that she has been a member of or toured with include Gonzalez, Art of Noise, and Shakatak. She was also in a group called Sugar Cane that had Reggie Tsiboe in their line up.

Taylor was a housewife and was married to a bass player for seven years. After that relationship ended, she started her career. She was in a funk band called Sox. She was also in a group called North Side Rhythm and Blues Ensemble, which was an eighteen-piece band that revamped 30s and 40s music.

== Career (work with other artists) ==
Sugar Cane

For some time she was in the Ariola, Hansa group Sugar Cane who had a hit on the charts with "Montego Bay" which spent five weeks in the UK charts, peaking at no. 54.

Gonzalez

The Gonzales single "Fell In Love" was released on Capitol 4921. It was reviewed in the September 6, 1980 issue of Record World with the reviewer saying that the group had hit the mark with this spirited funky track and singers Alan Marshall and Linda Taylor's vocal trades were captivating.

Cayenne

The Latin-infused Roberto Who? album by Cayenne with Linda Taylor on vocals was released on Groove Production GPLP 30 in June 1981. The single "Roberto Who?" credited to Cayenne featuring Linda Taylor made its debut at no. 30 in the Record Business Disco Top 50 chart on the week of July 20. There was also a review in the magazine for the Badness album by Morrissey Mullen. In the magazine's Best of the rest section, the Chris Palmer produced album received a positive review with the slinky vocals of Linda Fletcher, the clean guitar lines of Jim Mullen and the sophisticated sax of Dick Morrissey being noted. It was released on Beggars Banquet BEGA 27. The following week the magazine had corrected their error and the wrote that the non-existent Linda Fletcher was Linda Taylor. They also wrote, "Linda is currently recording a single in her own right for Groove Productions, and thus stands to have a hat-trick of simultaneous hits within a few weeks".

The Cayenne album would be reissued on Coda CODA 11 in late 1984 after being unavailable for some time.

Street Angels

Around 1983, Taylor was a member of the electro jazz-funk group Street Angels, which also included Andrea Barker and Charita Thomas in the lineup. Their new single "Dressing Up" composed by Steve Jerome, was reviewed by Barry Lazell in his Disco Commentary section. The single was originally released in a limited supply on 12" for the Street Beat label, but the demand for it was more than the supply could offer. It was picked up by another label and the original Street Beat Logo was kept. Taylor was referred to as session-singer extraordinaire".

"Dressing Up" debuted at no. 84 in the Music Week The Next 25 chart on the week of November 5, 1983. It debuted at no. 14 in the Music Week Disco & Dance Top Singles chart on the week of 12 November. It would peak at no. 3 on the Disco & Dance Top Singles chart on the week of November 26. It peaked at no. 81 in the Next 25 chart on the week of November 12.

== Solo career ==
As reported in Nigel Hunter's News in Brief column in the August 22, 1981, issue of Music Week, Linda Taylor had signed with Janmar Music which is managed by Beadle Music. It was also mentioned that she had a track, "Stay a While", in the Morrissey Mullen album.

Taylor recorded the song "(You're) In The Pocket" which was released on a 12" single (Groove Production GP 109 T) in 1981. It made its debut at no. 48 in the Record Business Disco Top 50 chart on the week of September 21. On the week of October 5, it had moved up to no. 31.

Her album Taylor Made was one of the three potential monsters noted in the Disco Dealer column of the May 10, 1982 issue of Record Business. Produced by Chris Palmer, it was also referred to as an excellent debut set. On the week of 17 May 1982, her album Taylor Made made its debut at no. 7 in the Record Business, Disco Bestsellers albums chart.

=== You and Me Just Started ===
On the week of 24 April 1982, "You and Me Just Started" was at no. 63 in the UK Disco Top 90 chart. On the week of 26 April 1982, her single made its debut at no. 56 in the Record Business Disco Best Sellers Bubbling Under chart.

On the week of 3 May, the single made its debut at no. 24 in the Record Business Disco Top 50 chart. The single had also made its debut at no. 20 in the Disco Bestsellers Twelve Inchers chart. On the week of 10, May, the single was at 18. It peaked in the Record Business Disco Top 50 chart at no. 8 on the week of 24 May. It also peaked at no. 5 in the Record Business 12 Inchers chart that week.

On the week ending 19 June 1982, her single "You and Me Just Started" made its debut in the Billboard Dance / Disco Top 80 chart at no. 52. With a significant response, it was at no. 48 the following week. On the week ending August 7, with a significant response to the single, it had moved up from 25 to 19. On the week ending August 28, it was at its second week at peak position no. 13.

=== Taylor Made album ===
According to the February 8, 1982 issue of Record Business, Linda Taylor's album was unfinished. Groove Productions' Chris Palmer had come back from Midem and had worldwide licensing deals for her album Taylor Made. Recording was supposed to be due for completion that week, and a UK release was scheduled for the 1st of April.

It was reported in the April 19 issue of Record Business that Groove Records, now known as Groove Productions, had stopped using Pinnacle as their distributor and were now using PRT. Through that new distribution was the album Taylor Made on the 23rd of that month.

Released on Groove Production GPLP31, the album featured the songs, side A: "You and Me Just Started", "Sweet Fever", "Walking In the Sun" and "Don't Lose The Motion". Side B: "Do You Know What I Am", "Let Me Into Your Heart" and "(You're) In The Pocket". She was backed by Chris Palmer on bass and synthesizer, John McKenzie on bass, Jeff Dunne, Martin David, Pete Baron and Tony Beard on drums, Danny Schogger on electric piano, acoustic piano and syntheszer, John self on harmonica, Derek Lewis on percussion, Max Middleton on acoustic piano, Chris Hunter and Mel Collins on saxophones, Annie Whitehead on trombone, Guy Barker, Martin Drover and Steve Sidwell on trumpets. Backing vocals were provided by Taylor, Chrissie Dixon, Nick Curtis, Ray Shell, Sheila Worrall and Tessa Webb.

The album was one of the three potential monsters noted in the Disco Dealer column of the May 10, 1982 issue of Record Business. Produced by Chris Palmer, it was also referred to as an excellent debut set. On the week of 17 May 1982, her album Taylor Made made its debut at no. 7 in the Record Business, Disco Bestsellers albums chart.

According to James Hamilton, the standout on the album was "Walking In The Sun", which he referred to as "superb gut-wrenching deep, deep soul". He also said "nothing else can approach the dance appeal of ‘You And Me Just Started" but "Don't Lose the Motion" tries.

=== Further activities ===
On the week of January 17, 1987, her single "Every Waking Hour" was at no. 2 in the Eurobeat Top 30 chart. It was referred to in James Hamilton's column in Music Week, January 24 issue as exciting Hi NRG pop. The song made its debut at no. 71 in the Music Week Top Dance Singles for the week of January 31, 1987.
