= Touchpaper (album) =

Studio album by Claire Hamill
- Released: 21 April 1984
- Genre: Art rock; dream pop; synth-pop
- Length: 37:51
- Label: Blueprint
- Producer: Claire Hamill; Andy Stennett

Claire Hamill chronology
Abracadabra (1975)	Touchpaper (1984)	Voices (1986)

Singles from Touchpaper
- 1. "In the Palm of My Hand" Released: 1983; 2. "The Moon Is a Powerful Lover" Released: 1984; 3. "Denmark" Released: 1984

Professional ratings
Review scores
Source	Rating
AllMusic	3/5 stars

Touchpaper is the fifth studio album by the English singer-songwriter Claire Hamill, released on 21 April 1984 by Blueprint Records, and was her first studio album in nine years following 1975's Abracadabra. The album saw her transition into a world of synthesizers, and Gary Numan of Tubeway Army played keyboards on the track "Ultra Violet Light".

== Track listing ==
All tracks are written by Claire Hamill, except where noted.

Side one: Moon Side

1. "The Moon Is a Powerful Lover" – 5:00
2. "Denmark" – 3:20
3. "Fools in a Storm" – 3:46
4. "First Night in New York" – 4:22
5. "Come Along Brave Lads" (Andy Stennett) – 3:39

Side two: Jump Side

6. "Jump" – 4:05
7. "In the Palm of My Hand" – 3:25
8. "Gonna Be the One" – 4:03
9. "Ultra Violet Light" – 2:40
10. "Once Is Not Enough" – 3:31

== Personnel ==
Credits are adapted from the Touchpaper liner notes.

Musicians

- Claire Hamill – vocals; guitar; keyboards
- Andy Stennett – keyboards
- Ron Mathewson — acoustic bass
- Neal Wilkinson – drums on "Denmark" and "In the Palm of My Hand"
- Mitch Dalton – guitar on "Denmark"
- John Rocca – percussion on "Fools in a Storm"
- Dave Roach – saxophone on "Fools in a Storm"
- Joe Partridge— guitar on "First Night in New York
- Ronnie Leahy — keyboards on "First Night in New York"
- John Giblin — bass on "First Night in New York"
- Simon Phillips – bass on "First Night in New York"
- Morris Pert — percussion on "First Night in New York"
- Paul Morgan – drums on "Come Along Brave Lads" and "Jump"
- Vincent Abbot — bagpipes on "Come Along Brave Lads"
- Peter Maas – bass on "Jump"
- John McKenzie – bass on "Gonna Be the One"
- Tony Beard – drums on "Gonna Be the One" and "Once Is Not Enough"
- Gary Numan — keyboards on "Ultra Violet Light"
- Alan White — drums on "Ultra Violet Light"
- Steve Gould — bass on "Ultra Violet Light"
- Laurie Wisefield — guitar on "Ultra Violet Light"
- Danny McIntosh – guitar on "Once Is Not Enough"
