= Gonzalez (band) =

British R&B and funk band (1970–1986)

- Origin: London, England
- Genres: R&B; funk; soul; disco
- Years active: 1970–1986
- Labels: EMI; Capitol
- Past members: Bobby Tench; Lenny Zakatek; Robert Ahwai; Godfrey McLean; Delisle Harper; Kuma Harada; Linda Taylor; Lennox Langton; Steve Waller; Glen LeFleur; Geoffrey "Bud" Beadle; Cliff Lake; Roy Davies; Mick Eve; Gordon Hunte; Chris Mercer; Colin Jackas; Bobby Stignac; Larry Steele; Viola Wills; George Chandler; Janice Hoyte; Ron Carthy; Preston Heyman; Sergio Castillo; John Giblin; Hugh Bullen; Steve Gregory

Gonzalez were a British R&B, Disco and funk band. They became well known as a backup band for touring R&B, funk, and soul stars. Their eponymous album was released in 1974 and they recorded a total of six albums before disbanding in 1986. They are best known for their 1979 single success with their worldwide disco hit "Haven't Stopped Dancing Yet."

== History ==
The original band was formed in 1970 by Godfrey McLean and Bobby Tench who were members of Gass and included other members of that band. It had the line-up of Tench as vocalist and guitarist, drummer Godfrey McLean, bassist Delisle Harper, and percussionist Lennox Langton. At the end of May 1970, Tench left Gonzalez to become a member of The Jeff Beck Group and the band formed a new core membership, with saxophonists Michael "Mick" Eve, Chris Mercer, Steve Gregory, Geoffrey "Bud" Beadle, keyboardist Roy Davies, and guitarist Gordon Hunte. Later George Chandler, Glen LeFleur, Cliff Lake, and Delisle Harper were included whilst simultaneously members of Olympic Runners. Vocalist Lenny Zakatek joined in 1974 and they released their first album Gonzalez (1974), which featured a heavy funk sound. This album made them Queen bassist John Deacon's favourite band in the mid 1970s. Our Only Weapon Is Our Music (1975) followed, released on EMI's sister label, Capitol.

In 1976, drummer Preston Heyman joined the band and alongside Gloria Jones they appeared as the support band for Bob Marley at his Hammersmith Odeon Shows. In 1977, at Air Studios London they recorded Jones's song "Haven't Stopped Dancing Yet" which reached No. 26 on the Billboard Hot 100 and established a following amongst disco enthusiasts. A remix of the same song reached No. 7 on the US Club Play chart and No. 15 in the UK Singles Chart. The band's third and fourth albums, Shipwrecked and Move It to the Music, were produced by Jones. Waller joined Manfred Mann's Earth Band, while Eve, Lake, and Hunte left before their single "Ain't No Way to Treat a Lady" (1979) was released.

In 1980, after five years with the band, Lenny Zakatek left to sing vocals with the Alan Parsons Project. The band's follow-up singles and their fifth album Watch Your Step, were not successful and the group lost its major label status. Gonzalez then worked with Pye Records and concentrated on live performances, usually backing R&B, funk and soul stars, such as Freddie King. Roy Davies died in 1986 and Gonzalez disbanded.

Guitarist Cliff Lake appeared with other artists such as Doris Troy, Edwin Starr, and Chris Rea. More recently Mick Eve, Kuma Harada, Bud Beadle, Cliff Lake, Preston Heyman, and Bobby Stignac have appeared on the London music circuit.

== Former members ==
- Steve Waller – guitar and vocals
- Roy Davies – keyboards
- Viola Wills – vocals
- Sergio Castillo – drums

== Discography ==
=== Albums ===
Year	Album	Label	Peak chart positions	
Year	Album	Label	US	AUS
1974	Gonzalez	EMI	—	—
1975	Our Only Weapon Is Our Music	Capitol	—	—
1977	Shipwrecked	Capitol	67	78
1979	Haven't Stopped Dancin'	Capitol	—	—
1979	Move It to the Music	Capitol	—	—
1980	Watch Your Step	Capitol	—	—
"—" denotes releases that did not chart or were not released.

=== Singles ===
Year	Single	Peak chart positions			
Year	Single	US Dance	US R&B	US Pop	UK
1974	"Pack It Up"	―	―	―	―
1975	"Got My Eye on You"	―	―	―	―
1975	"Hole in My Soul"	―	―	―	―
1976	"Brandy (You're a Fine Girl)"	―	―	―	―
1977	"Crystal Blue Persuasion"	―	―	―	―
1977	"Bless You"	―	―	―	―
1977	"I Haven’t Stopped Dancing Yet"	7	46	26	15
1978	"Just Let It Lay"	―	―	―	―
1979	"Peoples Party"	88	―	―	―
1979	"Move It to the Music"	―	―	―	―
1979	"Ain't No Way to Treat a Lady"	―	―	―	―
1980	"Digital Love Affair"	―	―	―	―
1980	"Fell in Love"	―	―	―	―
1982	"(I Want to Get) Closer to You"	―	―	―	―
1984	"Just My Imagination"	―	―	―	―
"—" denotes releases that did not chart or were not released in that territory.
