= Cheyenne Arapaho Hall =

Residence hall at University of Colorado Boulder

Coordinates: 40.005172°N 105.267798°W

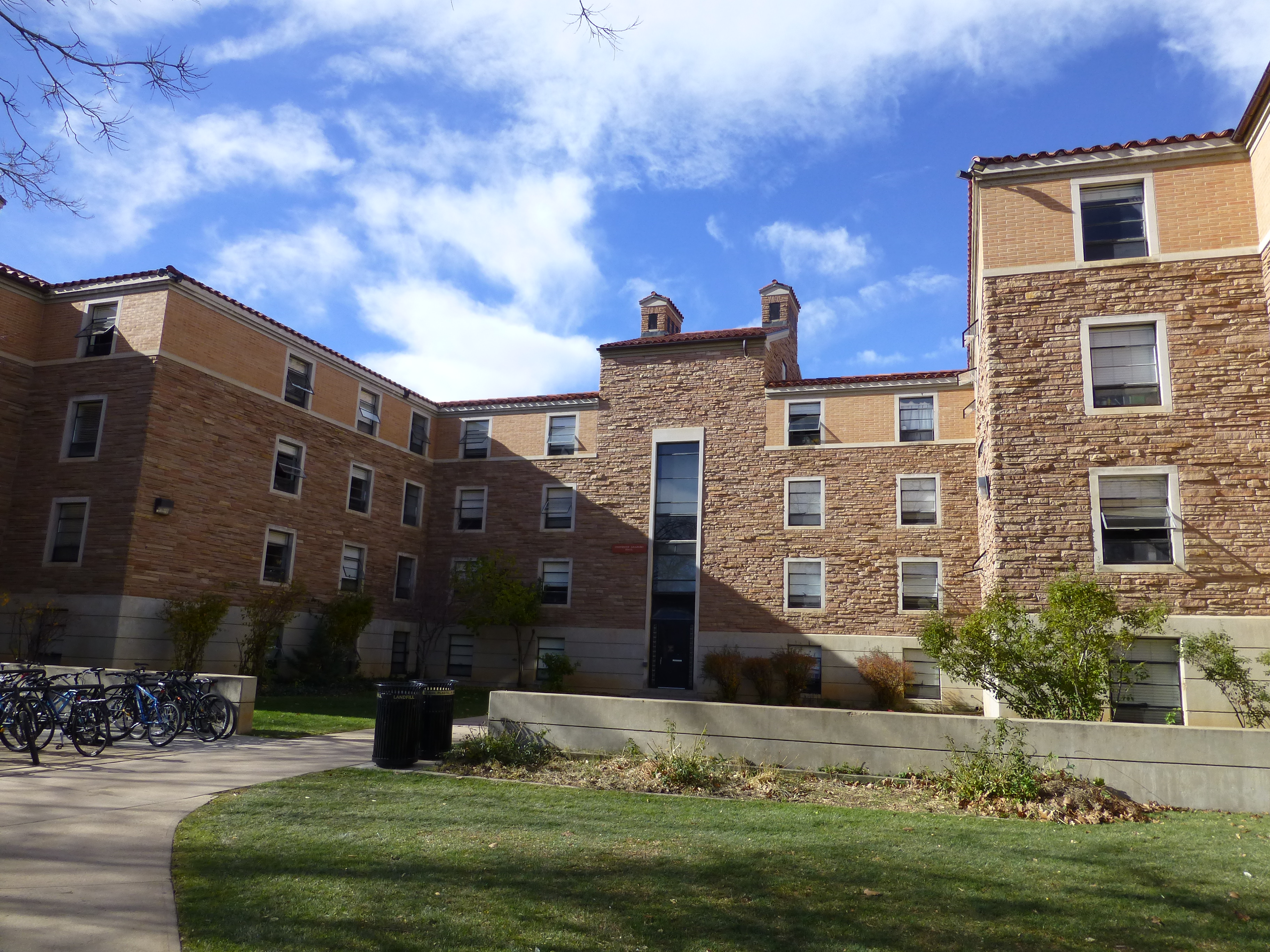
Cheyenne Arapaho Hall

Cheyenne Arapaho Hall is a student residence hall at University of Colorado Boulder, in Boulder, Colorado. Located on the south side of Farrand Field, between the Wardenburg Health Center and Willard Hall, it was completed in 1954 and designed by Trautwein & Howard (Philadelphia) and Peterson & Linstedt (Denver). In the Summer of 2007 Cheyenne Arapaho underwent the Residential Annual Modernization Program (RAMP) which updated community bathrooms, installed new flooring, doors, electronic locks and window coverings and repainted the building's entire interior. Refurbished rooms have bright new furniture and padded note-board walls, and bathrooms feature new sinks, countertops, low-flow toilets and showerheads and walls with tiled CU logos.

The 4-story residence hall holds 418 freshmen students of all academic majors. Cheyenne Arapaho Hall was originally named Fleming Hall, but was renamed Nichols Hall in 1961 after David H. Nichols. On October 6, 1989 it was finally renamed to Cheyenne Arapaho Hall for two tribes on the pre-settlement Colorado plains, villages of whom were targeted by the 3rd Colorado Volunteers at the Sand Creek Massacre in 1864. The hall was formerly named for David H. Nichols, Captain, Company H, 3rd Colorado Volunteers, who was at Sand Creek, and was an early proponent of the University. Cheyenne Arapaho Hall is reference in The State of Native America by M. Annette Jaimes.

Cheyenne Arapaho Hall consists of two wings with a main lobby containing a Grab-N-Go titled Piazanos which offers 100 percent natural, and organic (when available) food and beverages which opened Spring 2006. The dining hall on the 2nd floor of Cheyenne Arapaho was closed down in Fall 2005.

Students living in Cheyenne Arapaho Hall must participate in ARSC 1001 - The Contemporary University and Student Citizens, which began in the Fall Semester of 2007.

The Contemporary University and Student Citizens is an introductory course designed for entering University of Colorado students. Using an undergraduate seminar format, students begin to explore the role of universities in open, civilized societies from antiquity to the present-day University of Colorado Boulder.
