= USCGC Cheyenne =

History

United States
- Name: USCGC Cheyenne
- Operator: United States Coast Guard
- Builder: Maxon Construction Co., Tell City, Indiana
- Commissioned: 3 October 1966
- Home port: St. Louis, Missouri
- Status: In service

General characteristics
- Class & type: Gasconade-class 75 ft (23 m) river buoy tender
- Displacement: 141 tons
- Length: 75 ft (23 m)
- Beam: 22 ft (6.7 m)
- Draft: 4 ft 6 in (1.37 m)
- Propulsion: 2 Caterpillar diesel engines turning 2 shafts with 600 bhp
- Speed: 8 knots (15 km/h)
- Complement: 13 enlisted
- Armament: small arms
- Notes: Designed to work in tandem with a 90 ft (27 m) work barge

USCGC Cheyenne is a Gasconade-class 75-foot (23 m) river buoy tender which was built in 1966 at Tell City, Indiana by Maxon Construction Co. Upon commissioning she was assigned a homeport of Leavenworth, Kansas.

== Design ==
Cheyenne pushes a specific-use 90-foot (27 m) aid to navigation maintenance barge, with a crane and buoy service gear. The vessel has a 22-foot (6.7 m) beam, 4-foot (1.2 m) of draft, and displaces 141 tons (full load). She is powered by two Caterpillar diesel engines turning 2 shafts with 600 bhp, giving the vessel a capability of 8 knots (15 km/h).

== History ==
Cheyenne was initially assigned a homeport at Leavenworth, Kansas, in 1966 but was transferred to Coast Guard Base St. Louis, Missouri, in 1970. Since the Great Flood of 1993, she has been homeported at the foot of Arsenal Street in St. Louis. She is commanded by a master chief boatswain's mate with a crew of thirteen assigned. Her area of operation includes the upper Mississippi River mile marker 109.9 at Chester, Illinois, to mile 200.8 at Alton, Illinois; the Missouri River mile marker 0.0 at St. Louis, Missouri, to mile 226.3 at Glasgow, Missouri; and the Kaskaskia River at mile marker 0.0 to mile 28.5 at New Athens, Illinois.

== Bibliography ==
- "Maxon Marine, Tell City, Indiana". shipbuildinghistory.com.
- "Sector Upper Mississippi River Cutters". USCG Sector Upper Mississippi River. U.S. Coast Guard.
- Scheina, Robert L. (1990). U.S. Coast Guard Cutters & Craft, 1946-1990. Naval Institute Press, Annapolis. ISBN 978-0-87021-719-7.
