= Garrod and Lofthouse =

British printing company

Garrod & Lofthouse
- Company type: Private
- Industry: Printing; Record sleeve manufacturing
- Defunct: 1988
- Fate: Liquidated
- Headquarters: Chaldon Road, Caterham, Surrey, United Kingdom
- Area served: United Kingdom; France (via subsidiary Imprimerie du Nord)
- Products: Record sleeves (including Two-Piece sleeves, laminated sleeves, gatefold sleeves)

Garrod and Lofthouse were a British printing company based in Chaldon Road, Caterham, Surrey, who manufactured record sleeves. In 1963, the company patented the design for Two-Piece sleeves that were used in the UK.

The advantage of these sleeves, in the days of single colour printing, was that the four-colour front was printed on a separate sheet to the single colour back and the two halves were then glued together as the sleeve was fabricated. This allowed half the number of passes through a printing press to produce the front cover, and a quarter for the monochrome backs. This gave a reduction in print costs of 37.5%. As the two fronts could be laminated together, it halved the amount of laminating time.

Because of these cost reductions the company were contracted to print sleeves for 90% of all EMI affiliated labels volume on the basis that they never produced a sleeve for Decca Records, their only major competitor. They are therefore credited on all original LP releases of the Beatles, including Sgt. Pepper's Lonely Hearts Club Band.

Garrod and Lofthouse printed for most UK record companies outside Decca, and manufactured covers for France through a subsidiary Imprimerie du Nord. They were given special permission to press the Rolling Stones' Beggars Banquet (one of the first gatefold sleeves) and Sticky Fingers (manufactured with a metal zip glued down the front), as Decca's in-house staff could not manage the complex production to the volume required.

The company was liquidated in 1988, by which time sleeve manufacturing could be done by any generic process, and cassette and compact disc sleeves did not require carboard printing.
