= Cheyenne (given name) =

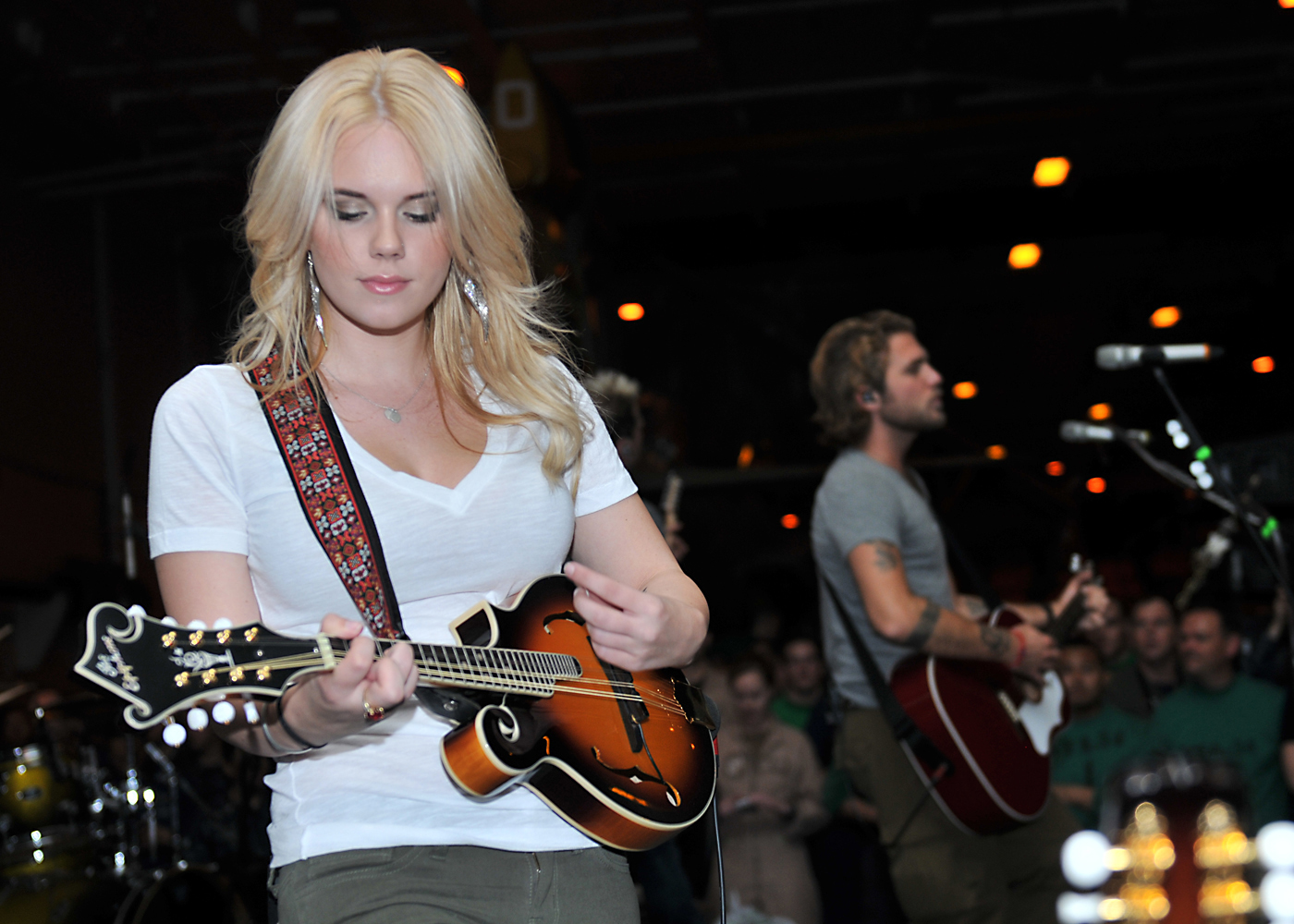
- American singer-songwriter Cheyenne Kimball
- Pronunciation: /ʃaɪˈæn/ shy-AN
- Gender: Unisex

Origin
- Origin: Uncertain; used to describe the Cheyenne, an American indigenous people of the Great Plains.
- Meaning: "seizing by the heel", "supplanting"
- Region of origin: North America, Europe

Other names
- Related names: Cheyanne, Shyanne

Cheyenne (/ʃaɪˈæn/ shy-AN) is a unisex name of Lakota origin, though it is more commonly used by females than males. The origin of the word is uncertain, though it may be derived from the Lakota language, from the word Šahíyena. Alternative spellings include Cheyanne and Shyanne and diminutives include Chey (IPA: /ʃaɪ/). The name has enjoyed some degree of popularity in recent years in the United States, with it being in the top 450 names for girls between 2000 and 2017, according to the Social Security Administration.

Bearers of the name include:

== Women ==
- Cheyenne Brando (1970–1995), Tahitian fashion model and daughter of Marlon Brando
- Cheyenne Campbell (born 1986), New Zealander rugby union player
- Cheyenne Carron (born 1976), French film director, screenwriter, and producer
- Cheyenne Cher, stage name of American female professional wrestler Dee Chocktoot, one of The Cheerleaders from the Gorgeous Ladies of Wrestling
- Cheyanne Evans-Gray (born 1998), British sprinter
- Cheyenne Goh (born 1999), Singaporean short track speed skater
- Cheyenne Haynes (born 1995), American actress, performer, and child model
- Cheyenne Kimball (born 1990), American singer-songwriter
- Cheyenne Knight (born 1997), American golfer
- Cheyenne Marie Mize, American folk singer-songwriter
- Cheyenne Nesbitt (born 1999), American heptathlete
- Cheyenne Ochsenknecht (born 2000), German model and child actress
- Cheyenne Parker-Tyus (born 1992), American WNBA basketball player
- Cheyenne Shorts (born 1998), American soccer player
- Cheyenne Webster (born 1998), American gymnast
- Cheyenne Woods (born 1990), American golfer

== Men ==
- Chey Dunkley (born 1992), English footballer
- Cheyenne Jackson (born 1975), American actor and singer
- Cheyenne Parker (model) (born, 1987), American model, fashion designer and business owner who appeared on reality television programs Fire Island and Ex on the Beach
