= Cheyenne Valley, West Virginia =

Unincorporated community in West Virginia, United States

Cheyenne Valley
- Unincorporated community
- Location within the state of West Virginia Cheyenne Valley (the United States)
- Coordinates: 38°27′5″N 81°57′34″W
- Country: United States
- State: West Virginia
- County: Putnam
- Elevation: 689 ft (210 m)
- Time zone: UTC-5 (Eastern (EST))
  - Summer (DST): UTC-4 (EDT)
- GNIS ID: 1740671

Cheyenne Valley is an unincorporated community in Putnam County, West Virginia, United States.
