= Cheyenne County =

Cheyenne County is the name of several counties in the United States:

- Cheyenne County, Colorado
  - Cheyenne County, Jefferson Territory
- Cheyenne County, Kansas
- Cheyenne County, Nebraska
