= Cheyenne Creek (South Dakota) =

Stream in South Dakota, U.S.

Coordinates: 43°03′21″N 102°34′36″W

Cheyenne Creek is a stream in the U.S. state of South Dakota.

Cheyenne Creek takes its name after the Cheyenne Indians.

== See also ==
- List of rivers of South Dakota
