= Cheyenne Township =

Cheyenne Township may refer to:

- Cheyenne Township, Barton County, Kansas
- Cheyenne Township, Lane County, Kansas, Lane County, Kansas
- Cheyenne Township, Roger Mills County, Oklahoma, see List of Oklahoma townships
- Rainy Creek/Cheyenne Township, Pennington County, South Dakota, see List of townships in South Dakota
