= Record Business =

Trade paper for the UK record industry

- The front page of the 6 November 1978 issue of Record Business.
- Categories: Business
- Frequency: Weekly
- Publisher: Record Business Publications Ltd.
- Founded: 1978; 47 years ago
- First issue: March 20, 1978; 47 years ago
- Final issue: February 14, 1983; 42 years ago
- Country: United Kingdom
- Based in: London
- Language: English
- ISSN: 0144-0691
- OCLC: 1065310893

Record Business was a trade publication for the UK record industry distributed via a weekly print magazine between 1978 and 1983. It was published by Record Business Publications Ltd.

== History ==
Record Business was launched on 20 March 1978 as a weekly trade publication for the UK record industry and a rival of Music Week. It was established by the former Music Week editor Brian Mulligan, with backing from the head of the British printing company Garrod and Lofthouse, Norman Garrod. An announcement of a new trade publication, with the provisional title Record Dealer, was made as early as November 1977, although Mulligan retained his position with Music Week until January 1978.

The magazine compiled its own top 100 singles chart to rival the singles charts produced by the British Market Research Bureau (BMRB) and Gallup (for Radio & Record News). The majority of the magazine's top 100 was calculated using both sales and airplay data, whereas the top 30 was based purely on sales, obtained from 350 outlets. In response to the launching of the Record Business and Radio & Record News charts, the BMRB extended their top 50 chart to a top 75 in May 1978.

Record Business subsequently extended their singles chart three times, providing a "Ones to Watch" section from 31 July 1978 for positions 101 to 120, then extending it up to position 130 from 9 February 1981, and then up to position 150 from 1 February 1982.

Record Business also compiled their Airplay Guide chart, which was the first in the UK to provide a "proper evaluation of radio action". Other charts included a top 60 album chart, introduced in June 1978, and a Disco Chart, introduced in October 1978, which at the time was the UK's only sales-based chart for the genre. In January 1980, Record Business also started publishing the first independent singles and albums charts, compiled by Barry Lazell.

Record Business published its final issue on 14 February 1983, after which it was absorbed into Music Week.
