= Giovanni Pernice =

Italian dancer and choreographer (born 1990)

- Born: 5 September 1990 (age 36); Palermo, Sicily, Italy
- Occupation: Professional dancer
- Known for: Strictly Come Dancing; Ballando con le Stelle
- Height: 1.78 m (5 ft 10 in)

Giovanni Pernice (born 5 September 1990) is an Italian professional dancer based in the United Kingdom, best known for his appearances on the British television show Strictly Come Dancing. He is also an Italian Open Latin Dance Champion (2012), and the Guinness World Record holder for Jive kicks and flicks, as well as Charleston swivels.

== Early life ==
Pernice was born on 5 September 1990 in Palermo, Sicily, and at the age of 14 he moved to Bologna to concentrate on dance. He chose to become a dancer after watching the British ballroom dance television show Come Dancing. Specialising in Latin style, Pernice has won a number of competitions, most notably, the Italian Open Championship in 2012.

Pernice is a member of the Federazione Italiana Danza Sportiva, part of the World DanceSport Federation, and he competed at Youth and Adult levels between 2007 and 2014. Other notable results include coming second place in the International Open Latin in Slovenia in 2014, and wins in other Open competitions in Pieve di Cento, Italy (2011); Ancona, Italy (2011); San Marino (2011) and Sant Cugat del Vallès, Spain (2011). His competition dance partners include Erika Attisano (2011–2014) and Alexandra Koldan (2014–2015).

== Career ==
=== Strictly Come Dancing ===
In 2015, Pernice appeared as a professional dancer on BBC's Strictly Come Dancing for the first time in its thirteenth series. He was partnered with former Coronation Street actress Georgia May Foote. They reached the final of the competition but finished as joint runners-up alongside Kellie Bright and her professional partner, Kevin Clifton.

In 2016, Pernice returned to Strictly Come Dancing for its fourteenth series. He was partnered with television presenter Laura Whitmore. They were eliminated in Week 7 in a dance-off with Ore Oduba and Joanne Clifton, the eventual Series 14 champions, and finished in 9th place.

In 2017, Pernice returned to Strictly Come Dancing as a professional dancer for its fifteenth series. His celebrity partner was Debbie McGee, a television and radio presenter and former ballet dancer. They reached the final of the competition, finishing as joint runners-up alongside Alexandra Burke and her professional partner Gorka Márquez, and Gemma Atkinson and her professional partner Aljaž Škorjanec.

In 2018, Pernice competed in the sixteenth series of Strictly Come Dancing, partnered with Steps singer Faye Tozer. For the third time in four years, Pernice reached the final, finishing as joint runners-up alongside Joe Sugg and his professional partner Dianne Buswell, and Ashley Roberts and her professional partner Pasha Kovalev.

In 2019, Pernice was partnered with television and radio personality Michelle Visage for the show's seventeenth series. They reached week 9 of the competition, before being eliminated in a dance-off with Saffron Barker and AJ Pritchard.

In 2020, Pernice reached the semi-final of the eighteenth series with his partner Ranvir Singh, before being eliminated in a dance off with Jamie Laing and Karen Hauer.

In 2021, Pernice won the nineteenth series of Strictly Come Dancing, with EastEnders actress, Rose Ayling-Ellis. Ayling-Ellis was the first deaf contestant to appear on the show. In the series’ Halloween special, Ayling-Ellis and Pernice received the earliest 40 throughout Strictly history with their Tango. The pair also received an 'Unmissables' Award from Heat for the silent moment in their Couple's Choice routine.

In 2022, Pernice was partnered with television and radio presenter Richie Anderson. They were eliminated in week 3, making it the earliest week Pernice has ever been eliminated in.

In 2023, Pernice was partnered with actress Amanda Abbington. On 20 October 2023, it was announced that for medical reasons, Abbington and Pernice would have to miss that Saturday's appearance on the show. She withdrew from the competition three days later.

As a Strictly professional dancer, Pernice holds the record for most tens ever awarded, with a total of 97. He has topped the weekly Strictly leaderboard more times than any other pro in the history of the show. He is also informally known as 'The King of Halloween', as he has topped the leaderboard during Halloween Week for every series he has competed in and still been in the competition during the Halloween Special.

Pernice has also appeared on a number of episodes of BBC Two's Strictly Come Dancing: It Takes Two. Pernice is the current Guinness World Record holder for Jive kicks and flicks, performing 55 in 30 seconds in a challenge held in December 2016. The next year, in December 2017, he broke the world record for the most Charleston swivel steps in 30 seconds, correctly completing 24. Both records were achieved on It Takes Two with supervision by Guinness World Records.

==== Complaint and departure ====
In January 2024, The Sun reported that Amanda Abbington had requested footage of her time training with Pernice and was seeking legal advice over his training methods; that month, Debbie McGee shared a post in support of Pernice on X (formerly Twitter). In March 2024, The Sun said that Abbington, Laura Whitmore and Ranvir Singh had met to discuss their negative experiences with Pernice on the show. Legal firm Carter Ruck told BBC News there were "numerous serious complaints" about his behaviour while filming Strictly. On 16 May, it was reported by The Sun that Pernice had quit the show. Pernice denied all accusations of wrongdoing. His departure was confirmed by the BBC on 10 June.

It was reported in September 2024 that the BBC had issued an apology to Amanda Abbington and upheld her complaints of verbal bullying and harassment against Pernice, but rejected allegations of physical aggression. Abbington, known for her role in Sherlock, described the apology as a "vindication" and expressed hope that it would encourage others to speak out.

Pernice, however, maintained that he had always strongly denied any wrongdoing and expressed relief that the more serious accusations were dismissed. The BBC acknowledged that while the production team had taken steps to address the issues, these measures were ultimately deemed inadequate, prompting a review of their internal protocols.

==== Highest and lowest scoring performances per dance ====
Dance	Partner	Highest	Partner	Lowest
American Smooth	Debbie McGee; Rose Ayling-Ellis	39	Ranvir Singh	32
Argentine Tango	Debbie McGee; Rose Ayling-Ellis	40	Ranvir Singh	36
Cha-Cha-Cha	Georgia May Foote	33	Richie Anderson	23
Charleston	Faye Tozer; Georgia May Foote	40	Georgia May Foote; Debbie McGee	39
Couple's Choice	Faye Tozer; Rose Ayling-Ellis	40	Michelle Visage	33
Dance-A-Thon	Faye Tozer; Georgia May Foote	6	Debbie McGee	5
Foxtrot	Michelle Visage	39	Amanda Abbington	31
Jive	Faye Tozer	36	Rose Ayling-Ellis	22
Paso Doble	Faye Tozer	38	Ranvir Singh	28
Quickstep	Rose Ayling-Ellis	39	Ranvir Singh; Debbie McGee	28
Rumba	Georgia May Foote; Debbie McGee	36	Georgia May Foote	27
Salsa	Debbie McGee	39	Rose Ayling-Ellis	26
Samba	Faye Tozer	37	Richie Anderson	27
Showdance	Faye Tozer; Rose Ayling-Ellis	40	Georgia May Foote	36
Tango	Debbie McGee; Rose Ayling-Ellis	40	Georgia May Foote	35
Viennese Waltz	Faye Tozer	40	Amanda Abbington	29
Waltz	Faye Tozer; Rose Ayling-Ellis	39	Georgia May Foote	25

=== Ballando con le Stelle ===
In September 2024, he was confirmed as a professional partner for Series 19 of Ballando con le Stelle, the Italian version of Strictly, going on to win in December 2024 with his partner Bianca Guaccero. In September 2025, he was confirmed as Francesca Fialdini's professional partner for Series 20, going on to finish 2nd in December 2025.

== Strictly Come Dancing Performances ==
Series	Partner	Place	Average Score
13	Georgia May Foote	2nd	33.8
14	Laura Whitmore	9th	31.3
15	Debbie McGee	2nd	35.4
16	Faye Tozer	2nd	36.5
17	Michelle Visage	7th	33.1
18	Ranvir Singh	5th	31.3
19	Rose Ayling-Ellis	1st	35.4
20	Richie Anderson	14th	27.3
21	Amanda Abbington	11th	30.5

=== Series 13: with Georgia May Foote ===
The couple were runners-up.

Week No.	Dance/Song	Judges' score				Total	Result
Week No.	Dance/Song	Horwood	Bussell	Goodman	Tonioli	Total	Result
1	Jive / "Dear Future Husband"	6	7	7	7	27	No Elimination
2	Waltz / "Georgia on My Mind"	6	6	6	7	25	Safe
3	Rumba / "Writing's on the Wall"	7	7	6	7	27	Safe
4	Quickstep / "Reach"	7	7	9	8	31	Safe
5	Salsa / "You Make Me Feel (Mighty Real)"	7	8	8	8	31	Safe
6	Tango / "Ghostbusters"	8	9	9	9	35	Safe
7	Samba / "Volare"	8	9	9	9	35	Safe
8	Charleston / "Hot Honey Rag"	9	10	10	10	39	Safe
9	American Smooth / "I Have Nothing"	9	9	10	10	38	Safe
10	Paso Doble / "The Final Countdown"	8	8	8	9	33	Safe
10	Quickstep-a-thon / "Sing Sing Sing"	Awarded	6	Extra	Points	39	Safe
11	Foxtrot / "Beauty and the Beast"	9	9	9	9	36	Bottom two
12	Cha-Cha-Cha / "I Will Survive"; Viennese Waltz / "Runaway"	8; 9	8; 10	8; 9	9; 10	33; 38	Safe
13	Rumba / "Writing's on the Wall"; Showdance / "Fix You"; Charleston / "Hot Honey Rag"	9; 9; 10	9; 9; 10	9; 9; 10	9; 9; 10	36; 36; 40	Runners-Up

=== Series 14; with Laura Whitmore ===
Due to an ankle injury, Whitmore was unable to dance in week 5 and the couple were given a bye to progress to the next week. The couple were eliminated in week 7.

Week No.	Dance/Song	Judges' score				Total	Result
Week No.	Dance/Song	Horwood	Bussell	Goodman	Tonioli	Total	Result
1	Cha-Cha-Cha / "Venus"	5	6	7	7	25	None
2	Waltz / "If I Ain't Got You"	8	8	8	8	32	Safe
3	Salsa / "Rhythm of the Night"	7	7	7	9	30	Bottom Two
4	Quickstep / "The Ballroom Blitz"	8	8	8	9	33	Safe
5	Jive / "Reet Petite"	-	-	-	-	-	Given Bye
6	Tango / "Paint It Black"	9	9	9	9	36	Safe
7	Samba / "Bamboleo"	7	8	8	9	32	Eliminated

=== Series 15; with Debbie McGee ===
The couple were runners-up.

Week No.	Dance/Song	Judges' score				Total	Result
Week No.	Dance/Song	Horwood	Bussell	Ballas	Tonioli	Total	Result
1	Paso Doble / "Be Italian"	8	8	7	7	30	No Elimination
2	Viennese Waltz / "She's Always a Woman"	8	9	9	8	34	Safe
3	Quickstep / "Let's Call the Whole Thing Off"	6	8	7	8	29	Safe
4	Cha-cha-cha / "The Shoop Shoop Song (It's in His Kiss)"	6	6	7	8	27	Safe
5	Rumba / "Baby Can I Hold You"	9	9	9	-	27	Safe
6	Charleston / "Frankie"	9	10	10	10	39	Safe
7	Tango / "I Gotta Feeling"	10	10	10	10	40	Safe
8	Salsa / "Can't Take My Eyes Off You"	9	9	8	9	35	Safe
9	Samba / "Wannabe/Who Do You Think You Are"	7	8	9	9	33	Bottom Two
10	Argentine Tango / "Por una Cabeza"	9	9	10	10	38	Safe
10	Paso Doble-a-thon / "España cañí"	Awarded	5	extra	points	43	Safe
11	American Smooth / "Memory"	9	10	10	10	39	Safe
12	Jive / "I'm So Excited"; Foxtrot / "Isn't She Lovely"	7; 8	9; 9	9; 9	9; 10	34; 36	Safe
13	Salsa / "Can't Take My Eyes Off You"; Showdance / "One Day I'll Fly Away"; Argentine Tango / "Por una Cabeza"	9; 9; 10	10; 9; 10	10; 10; 10	10; 10; 10	39; 38; 40	Runners-Up

=== Series 16; with Faye Tozer ===
The couple were runners-up.

Week No.	Dance/Song	Judges' score				Total	Result
Week No.	Dance/Song	Horwood	Bussell	Ballas	Tonioli (Note: In week 5 guest judge Alfonso Ribeiro replaced Tonioli)	Total	Result
1	Cha-cha-cha / "Lullaby"	7	8	7	7	29	No Elimination
2	Viennese Waltz / "It's a Man's Man's Man's World"	8	8	7	8	31	Safe
3	Quickstep / "You're the One That I Want"	9	9	9	9	36	Safe
4	Rumba / "Chandelier"	7	7	7	8	29	Safe
5	Foxtrot / "Just the Way You Are"	8	9	8	8	33	Safe
6	Jazz / "Fever"	9	10	10	10	39	Safe
7	Tango/ "Call Me"	9	10	9	10	38	Safe
8	Jive/ "Reet Petite"	9	9	8	10	36	Safe
9	Paso Doble/ "Unstoppable"	9	9	10	10	38	Safe
10	Waltz / "See the Day"	9	10	10	10	39	Safe
10	Lindy Hop-a-thon / "Do Your Thing"	Awarded	6	extra	points	45	Safe
11	Charleston/ "The Lonely Goatherd"	10	10	10	10	40	Safe
12	Samba/ "I Go to Rio"; Argentine Tango/ "La cumparsita"	9; 9	9; 10	9; 10	10; 10	37; 39	Safe
13	Viennese Waltz / "It's a Man's Man's Man's World"; Showdance / "Lullaby of Broadway"; Jazz / "Fever"	10; 10; 10	10; 10; 10	10; 10; 10	10; 10; 10	40; 40; 40	Runners-Up

- Green number indicates Faye & Giovanni were at the top of the leaderboard.

=== Series 17; with Michelle Visage ===
The couple were eliminated in week 9, at Blackpool.

Week No.	Dance/Song	Judges' score				Total	Result
Week No.	Dance/Song	Horwood	Mabuse	Ballas	Tonioli (Note: In week 5 guest judge Alfonso Ribeiro replaced Tonioli)	Total	Result
1	Cha-Cha-Cha / "So Emotional"	8	8	7	7	30	No Elimination
2	Viennese Waltz / "That's Amore"	8	8	8	8	32	Safe
3	Quickstep / "Cabaret"	8	9	9	9	35	Safe
4	Salsa / "Quimbara"	7	8	8	8	31	Safe
5	Rumba / "Too Good at Goodbyes"	7	7	7	8	29	Safe
6	Foxtrot / "The Addams Family Theme"	9	10	10	10	39	Safe
7	Paso Doble / "Another One Bites the Dust"	8	9	9	8	34	Safe
8	American Smooth / "I Just Want to Make Love to You"	9	9	9	9	36	Bottom Two
9	Street / "Vogue"	8	8	8	8	32	Eliminated

- Green number indicates Michelle & Giovanni were at the top of the leaderboard
- Red number indicates Michelle & Giovanni were at the bottom of the leaderboard

=== Series 18; with Ranvir Singh ===
The couple were eliminated in week 8.

Week No.	Dance/Song	Judges' score			Total	Result
Week No.	Dance/Song	Horwood	Ballas	Mabuse	Total	Result
1	Paso Doble / "End of Time"	7	7	7	21	None
2	Quickstep / "You Are the Sunshine of My Life"	6	7	8	21	Safe
3	Foxtrot / "Love You I Do"	9	9	9	27	Safe
4	Cha-Cha-Cha / "Oye Como Va"/"I Like It Like That"	5	7	8^{1}	20	Safe
5	Argentine Tango / "When Doves Cry"	8	9	10^{1}	27	Safe
6	American Smooth / "I Say a Little Prayer"	8	8	8	24	Safe
7	Viennese Waltz / "She Used to Be Mine"	9	9	9	27	Safe
8	Waltz / "Un Giorno Per Noi (A Time for Us)"; Jive / "Candyman"	8; 5	9; 6	9; 7	26; 18	Eliminated

- Green number indicates Ranvir & Giovanni were at the top of the leaderboard
- Red number indicates Ranvir & Giovanni were at the bottom of the leaderboard

^{1} Score from guest judge Anton du Beke

=== Series 19; with Rose Ayling-Ellis ===
The Couple's Choice dance with Rose Ayling-Ellis, in week 8, featured a period of silence, included as a tribute to the deaf community. Judge Anton Du Beke described it as "the greatest thing I've ever seen on the show". it earned them the 2021 Heat Unmissables Award for TV Moment of the Year. On 18 December 2021 the couple were the series winners; it was the first win for Pernice.

Week No.	Dance/Song	Judges' score				Total	Result
Week No.	Dance/Song	Horwood (Note: In week 9 guest judge Cynthia Erivo replaced Horwood)	Mabuse (Note: In week 10 guest judge Cynthia Erivo replaced Mabuse)	Ballas	Du Beke	Total	Result
1	Jive / "Shake It Off"	6	6	4	6	22	No Elimination
2	Salsa / "Cuba"	6	7	6	7	26	Safe
3	Foxtrot / "Rose's Theme"	9	9	9	9	36	Safe
4	Cha-Cha-Cha / "Raspberry Beret"	7	6	6	8	27	Safe
5	Viennese Waltz / "Fallin'"	9	10	9	9	37	Safe
6	Tango / "Shivers"	10	10	10	10	40	Safe
7	Samba / "Cinema Italiano"	8	8	8	8	32	Safe
8	Couple's Choice / "Symphony"	9	10	10	10	39	Safe
9	Quickstep / "Love Is an Open Door"	10	9	9	9	37	Safe
10	Paso Doble / "California Dreamin'"	8	8	8	9	33	Safe
11	American Smooth / "This Will Be"	9	10	10	10	39	Safe
12	Waltz / "How Long Will I Love You?"; Argentine Tango / "A Evaristo Carriego"	9; 10	10; 10	10; 10	10; 10	39; 40	Safe
13	Quickstep / "Love Is an Open Door"; Couple's Choice / "Symphony"; Showdance / "The Rose"	9; 10; 10	10; 10; 10	10; 10; 10	10; 10; 10	39; 40; 40	Winners

- Green number indicates Rose & Giovanni were at the top of the leaderboard.

=== Series 20; with Richie Anderson ===
The couple were eliminated in week 3.

Week No.	Dance/Song	Judges' score				Total	Result
Week No.	Dance/Song	Horwood	Mabuse	Ballas	Du Beke	Total	Result
1	Cha-Cha-Cha / "I'm Your Man"	5	5	6	7	23	None
2	Quickstep / "Dancin' Fool"	8	8	8	8	32	Safe
3	Samba / "Hakuna Matata"	5	7	8	7	27	Eliminated

=== Series 21; with Amanda Abbington ===
Due to medical reasons, Abbington was unable to dance in week 5 and the couple were given a bye to progress to the next week. On 23 October 2023, Abbington withdrew from the competition.

Week No.	Dance/Song	Judges' score				Total	Result
Week No.	Dance/Song	Horwood	Mabuse	Ballas	Du Beke	Total	Result
1	Viennese Waltz / "Pointless"	7	7	8	7	29	None
2	Salsa / "Oye!"	8	8	8	8	32	Safe
3	Rumba / "Out of Reach"	6	8	8	8	30	Safe
4	Foxtrot / "Everywhere"	7	8	8	8	31	Safe
5	Cha-cha-cha / "Canned Heat"	-	-	-	-	-	Withdrew

=== Dance tours and professional dance engagements ===
Pernice took part in the national Strictly Come Dancing Live! tour in 2016 with his partner Georgia May Foote, and again in 2017 as part of the professional dance troupe for group numbers and professional dances. He partnered Debbie McGee in the 2018 live tour, Faye Tozer for the 2019 live tour and Rose Ayling-Ellis for the 2022 live tour.

In 2016, Pernice announced his first dance tour Dance is Life, translated from the Italian expression 'Il Ballo è Vita'. The tour comprised 32 dates in England, Scotland and Wales between April and July 2017, performing to positive reviews. The opening night was 26 April 2017 at the Albany Theatre, Coventry. The last performance took place on 23 July 2017 at the Marina Theatre, Lowestoft. In 2018, Pernice announced that his Dance is Life tour would be returning in 2019.

In September 2020, Pernice and Anton Du Beke announced a 2021 UK Tour called HIM & ME.

In September 2026, Pernice announced he was to appear at Donaheys 2027 "Dancing With The Stars Weekends".

Pernice also has his solo tour called The Last Dance in 2025.

== Personal life ==
In July 2021, Pernice confirmed that he was dating social media influencer and TV personality Maura Higgins. The pair split up four months later. Since 2024, Pernice is in a relationship with his Ballando con le Stelle partner, actress and TV presenter Bianca Guaccero.
