= Caistor Grammar School =

Grammar school in Lincolnshire, England

Location
- Church Street; Caistor, Lincolnshire, LN7 6QJ; England; 53.49657°N 0.32025°W

Information
- Type: Grammar school; Academy
- Motto: "Ever to Excel" (Greek: αἰὲν ἀριστεύειν)
- Religious affiliation: Christian
- Established: 1630; 396 years ago
- Founder: Francis Rawlinson
- Department for Education URN: 136350 Tables
- Ofsted: Reports
- Chair of Governors: Lucy Jackson
- Headteacher: Claire Owens
- Staff: ~200
- Gender: Mixed
- Age: 11 to 18
- Enrolment: approx. 680 students
- Houses: Hansard, Rawlinson & Ayscough
- Colours: Red & Black
- Publication: Caistor Focus
- Former pupils: Old Caistorians
- Website: caistorgrammar.com

Caistor Grammar School is a selective school with academy status in the English town of Caistor in the county of Lincolnshire, England. The school was founded in 1630. The school has been awarded specialist sports and humanities status. The headteacher is Claire Owens, who took up the position in September 2026, becoming the school's 29th head. In the 2017 Times newspaper league tables it is in the top ten mixed state schools in the country. The school was named Sunday Times Parent Power State Secondary School of the Year (East Midlands) 2018 in November 2017 and was the named the top school in the East Midlands by the Sunday Times in November 2019.

== History ==
Caistor Grammar School is an endowed school dating from the reign of Charles I. The Dissolution of the Monasteries in the reign of Henry VIII had destroyed the principal sources of education of the times, and the numerous schools endowed throughout England during the following reigns are evidence that public-spirited men recognised the need created and endeavoured to meet it. Among others was Francis Rawlinson, of South Kelsey, who died in 1630, bequeathing money to endow a school at Caistor, and William Hansard of Biscathorpe, who supplemented the original gift in 1634. The monies given were invested in the purchase of land at Cumberworth, and of the rectorial tithes of Bilsby, of which the governors are still lay impropriators.

The original trustees were Sir Edward Asycough of South Kelsey, Sir William Pelham of Brocklesby and Sir Christopher Wray, Lord Chief Justice, and Jonathan Beltwick. Other trustees shouldered their responsibilities from time to time until 1885 when, under the Endowed Schools Act 1869, the Foundation was placed under an elective body of governors, the Vicar of Caistor being an ex-officio member. In 1908 the school was recognised by the Board of Education.

On 11 November 1931 it celebrated its tercentenary in the presence of Sir Arthur Quiller-Couch.

Lindsey County Council, based in Lincoln, proposed to close the grammar school as it decided there were not enough numbers for three grammar schools in the area. On 18 February 1960 fifty-two boys and girls at the schools walked the twenty six miles to Lincoln. They gave a petition to the Council's Chairman, Sir Weston Cracroft Amcotts. Following national press coverage the school was saved from closure.

== School buildings ==
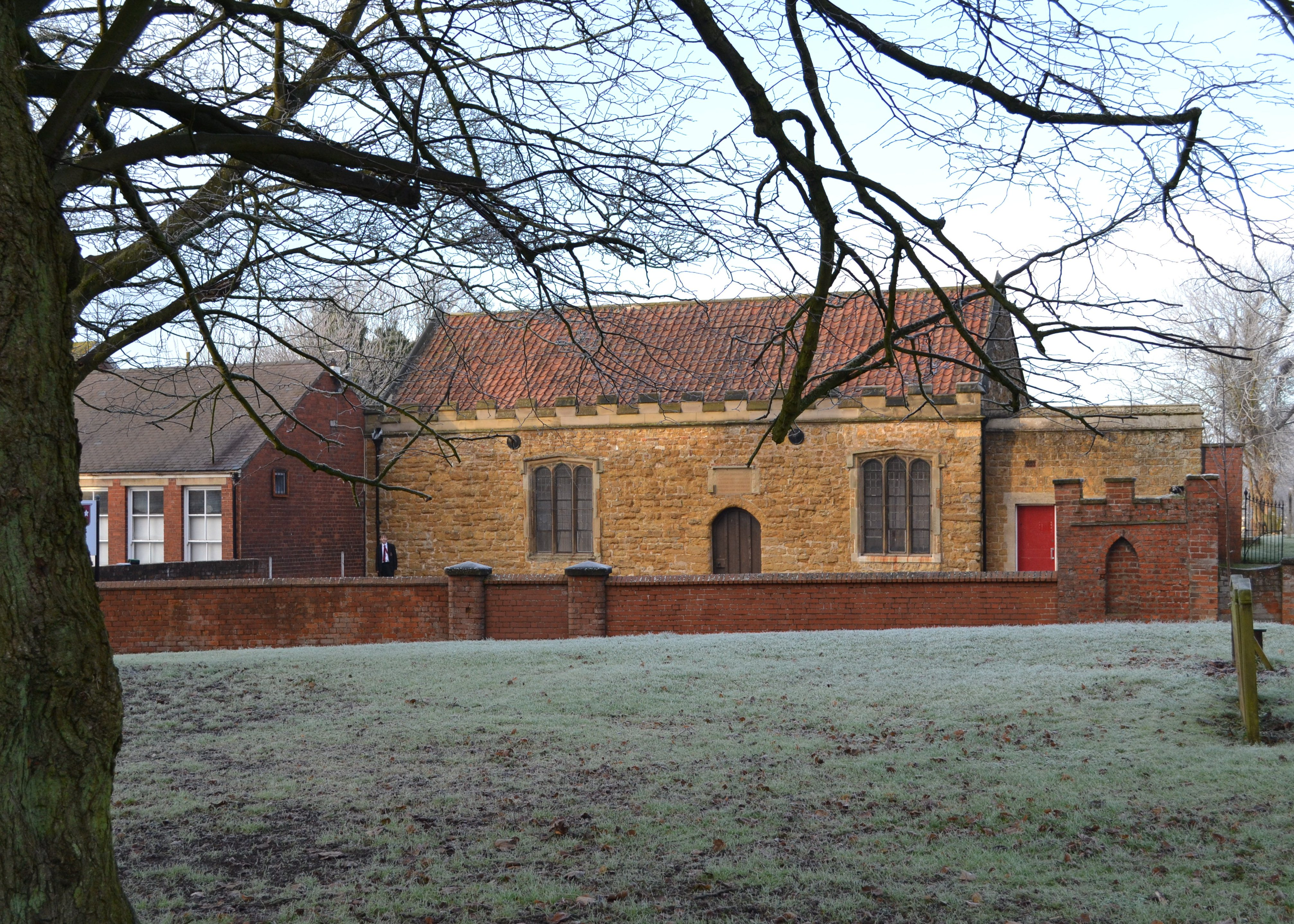
The Old Hall

The school occupies a site close to the centre of the small market town of Caistor, with remarkably steep topography. The ironstone school hall dates from 1631, and is still in daily use. The school library alongside is housed in what was the Congregational Church, built in 1842.

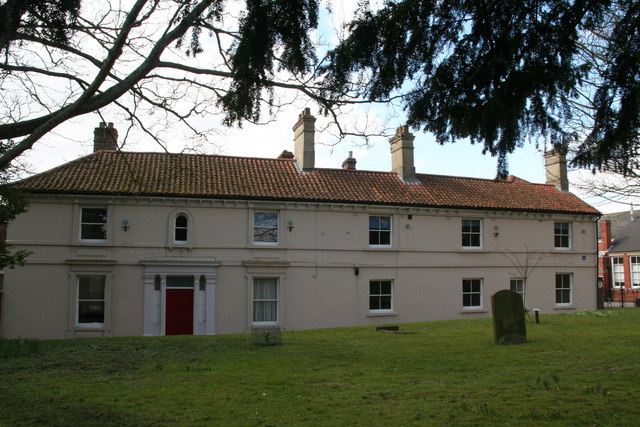
Casterby House

Casterby House, once a large private house, later one of three boarding houses, and now the Sixth Form Centre, overlooks the churchyard from the south side of the school gates. The name Casterby House is derived from former pupil Sir Henry Newbolt's semi-autobiographical novel the Twymans, in which Caistor is given the name Casterby.

The traditional teaching block dates from the 1930s, but was extended and modernised in 1984. The Manning Building, replacing several prefabricated buildings, was opened in 1984. Two new technology buildings were added in 1993 and 1994. Lindsey House, once a purpose-built boarding house, was remodelled into classrooms and the dining room, and then officially opened in November 2001 by Lord Puttnam of Queensgate. Beech House, traditionally the residence of the headmaster, is now where the site manager lives. There was an additional building, Grove House, but this was demolished because of structural problems.

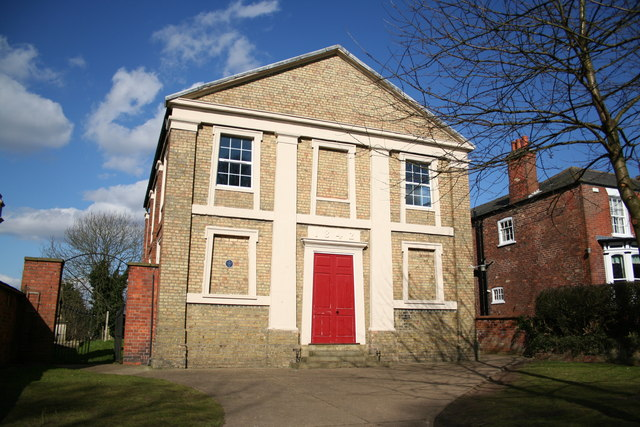
The school library

The name 'Grove' was then given to a building built in 2022, which opened in September of that year. This building took the place of the old 'Bottom court', with the school giving it the name 'Grove court'. This building has been used as the modern languages block.

The school previously owned several other buildings in Caistor, including the "Red House" next to Bank Lane, which were used as boarding accommodation. These have now however been sold off.

In 2010, as part of the Government Building Schools for the Future scheme, Caistor Grammar School secured funding to build an extension to Lindsey House, to provide renovated music facilities, another ICT facility and a room for food technology, something that is new to the CGS curriculum. The funding was secured only days before the scheme was scrapped by the Educational Secretary Michael Gove. The facilities were completed by the following Christmas, and were officially opened by celebrity chef Rachel Green on 24 May 2011. The food technology facilities were removed in 2018 to provide for an extended and remodelled dining area, stemming from the facilities' lack of use.

In 2013, a new science building was constructed adjacent to Lindsey House, named the Olympic Torch Building to honour the five CGS pupils who carried the torch for the London 2012 Olympic Games, as well as Jordan Duckitt, one of the seven young athletes to light the cauldron. A former student donated her Olympic torch which is on display at the main entrance. The building was opened in September 2013 by UK Sport chair Baroness Sue Campbell. The Olympic Torch building is currently used by the physics department.

To replace the aging "New Hall", the school decided to replace it with "The Newbolt Centre", to honour the English poet Henry Newbolt, who was enrolled at Caistor Grammar School. This new "New Hall" has PV cells, an air source heat pump and insulation (the new hall was noted by staff and student alike that it was incredibly cold and hot, weather dependant, and that the small heating element was not very effective).

== Departments and curriculum ==
Pupils are taught a variety of traditional subjects and modern languages remain compulsory to GCSE level. The school began delivering the Extended Project Qualification in September 2017. From September 2019, students will study 10 GCSEs. A level Psychology was also introduced in September 2019.

== Entry exam ==
As a selective school, Caistor Grammar School requires prospective pupils to pass the 11-plus. The current exam is set by the school. The first exam is a verbal reasoning paper and the second is multiple choice. The exams are held at the school approximately two weeks apart, and the results are issued up to a month after the last exam. In the event that more candidates pass the exam than there are places available, places are offered first to pupils from within the school's catchment area, which is defined as 6.5 miles in a straight line from the Head Master's Office to the applicant's residence".

Candidates from outside the catchment area are awarded places depending on their score in the examinations. Candidates that pass but cannot be offered a place are organised onto a waiting list. The exams can be retaken at Year 9, but there is no guarantee that the child will get a place, and the only guarantee is that the child is moved to a higher position on the waiting list. Entry to the Sixth Form is dependent on an applicant's GCSE results.

== Notable Old Caistorians ==
- Joanne Clifton, professional dancer on Strictly Come Dancing
- Kevin Clifton, professional dancer on Strictly Come Dancing
- Dawn French, actress (1969–70) when her father was stationed at the former RAF Faldingworth
- Anne Gibson, Baroness Gibson of Market Rasen, trade unionist
- Thomas Little Heath, scholar
- Aircraftman Vivian Hollowday GC, who was awarded the George Cross for rescuing airmen from burning planes at RAF Cranfield in Bedfordshire
- Sir Henry Newbolt, poet best remembered for Vitaï Lampada
- Charles Vernam, professional footballer for Grimsby Town

== Ofsted ==
On 22 November 2006, the school was included in the top category by Ofsted, the only Lincolnshire school to be listed. Ofsted inspected the school in 2008, and in its report, awarded Caistor Grammar School "outstanding" (the highest possible grade) in each category. They have recently been inspected (2022) and the school, has been downgraded to “good”.
