= Vivian Hollowday =

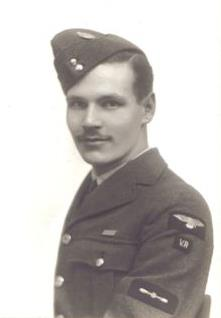
- Born: 13 October 1916; Ulceby, Lincolnshire, England
- Died: 15 April 1977 (aged 60); Bedford, Bedfordshire, England
- Burial place: Bedford Cemetery and Crematorium
- Military career
- Allegiance: United Kingdom
- Branch: Royal Air Force
- Rank: Corporal
- Service number: 935282
- Awards: George Cross; Mentioned in Despatches

Vivian Hollowday, GC (13 October 1916 – 15 April 1977), sometimes known as Bob Hollowday, was a British recipient of the George Cross, the highest British award for gallantry not in the face of the enemy. He was the first non-commissioned member of the Royal Air Force (RAF) to receive this honour.

== Early life ==
Hollowday attended Caistor Grammar School, where he was a boarder and played in the school orchestra, and later at Worksop College, a public school in North Nottinghamshire before joining the Royal Air Force at the start of the Second World War, in September 1939.

== Career ==
He was a member of 14 Flying Training School, and of the Royal Air Force Volunteer Reserve. He was cremated and buried at Bedford Cemetery and Crematorium, Renhold, Bedfordshire, England.

Along with the George Cross, Hollowday was the recipient of the 1939–45 Star, Africa Star, Italy Star, France and Germany Star, the Defence Medal, War Medal 1939–1945, and was Mentioned in Despatches. As a recipient of the George Cross he also received the Queen Elizabeth II Coronation Medal in 1953 and the Queen Elizabeth II Silver Jubilee Medal in 1977.

== George Cross ==
Then Aircraftman First Class Hollowday was awarded the George Cross for the "amazing courage and initiative" he showed in two attempted rescues of crashed RAF personnel, while based at RAF Cranfield. The first rescue attempt was on 2 July 1940, and the second on 27 August 1940. The following citation was printed in the London Gazette of 21 January 1941.

The King has been graciously pleased to approve the award of the George Cross to the undermentioned: –

935282 Aircraftman First Class Vivian Hollowday.

One night in July, 1940, when returning to camp, this airman observed an aircraft crash and burst into flames. He immediately proceeded to the wreckage and made his way through the burning debris which was scattered over a wide area by the force of the impact. He found the pilot whose clothing was on fire, and put out the flames with his bare hands. Had the pilot not been killed instantly in the crash this action would in all probability have saved his life. During August, 1940, this airman was again returning to the camp when an aircraft suddenly spun to the ground and exploded. He immediately went to the crash and a second explosion occurred. Ammunition was exploding all the time but despite this, he borrowed a gas mask, wrapped two sacks over himself and spent some time in the flames, making four attempts before he succeeded in releasing the first occupant. He then re-entered the burning wreckage and successfully removed the second. All three occupants, however, were already dead. Aircraftman Hollowday displayed amazing courage and initiative on both occasions.

— London Gazette

The pilot in the July crash was the only occupant of the plane. He was Sergeant Noel Francis Lloyd Davies and was 20 years old. He was buried in a private grave in his home town of Cleethorpes.
