= Strictly Come Dancing series 14 =

Strictly Come Dancing
- Series 14
- Presented by: Tess Daly; Claudia Winkleman
- Judges: Darcey Bussell; Len Goodman; Craig Revel Horwood; Bruno Tonioli
- Celebrity winner: Ore Oduba
- Professional winner: Joanne Clifton
- No. of episodes: 26

Release
- Original network: BBC One
- Original release: 3 September – 17 December 2016

Series chronology
- ← Previous; Series 13 Next → Series 15

Strictly Come Dancing returned for its fourteenth series with a launch show on 3 September on BBC One, while the live shows began on 23 September 2016. Tess Daly and Claudia Winkleman returned as hosts, while Zoe Ball returned to host Strictly Come Dancing: It Takes Two on BBC Two. Darcey Bussell, Len Goodman, Craig Revel Horwood, and Bruno Tonioli returned as judges. This was Goodman's final series as head judge.

BBC Sport presenter Ore Oduba and Joanne Clifton were announced as the winners on 17 December 2016, while Louise Redknapp and Kevin Clifton, and Danny Mac and Oti Mabuse were the runners-up.

== Format ==
Hosts and Judges for Strictly Come Dancing Series 14

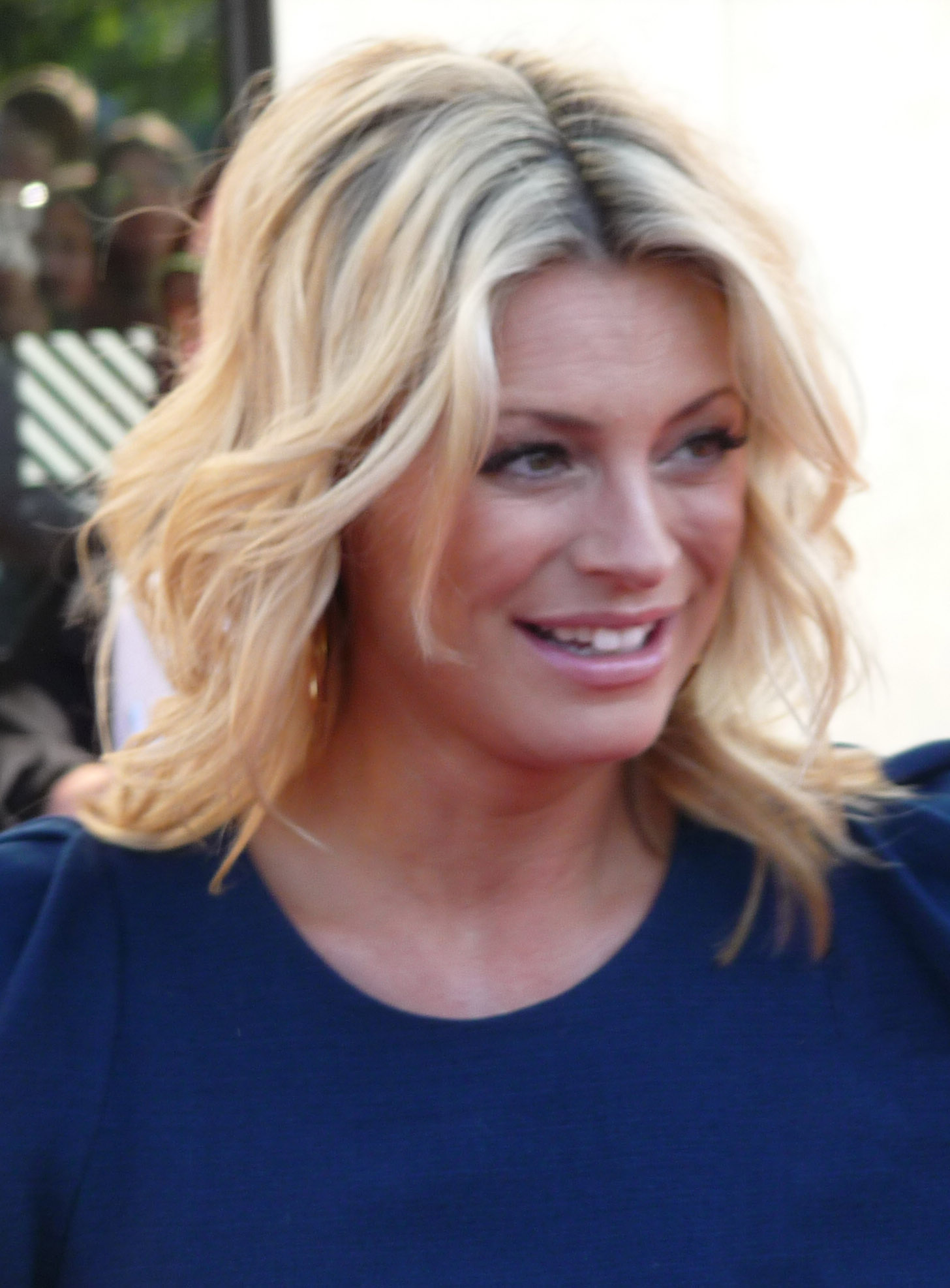
Tess Daly

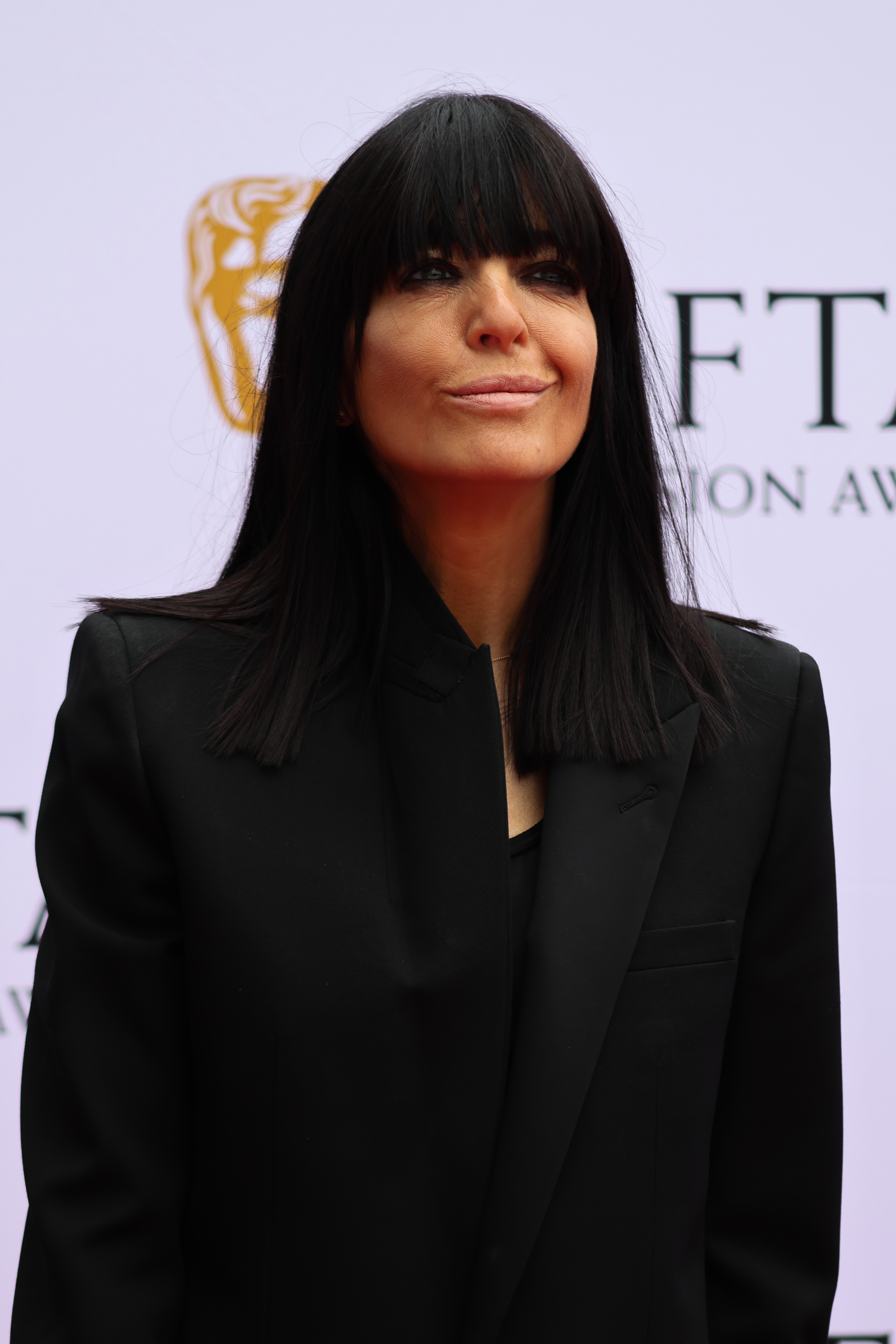
Claudia Winkleman

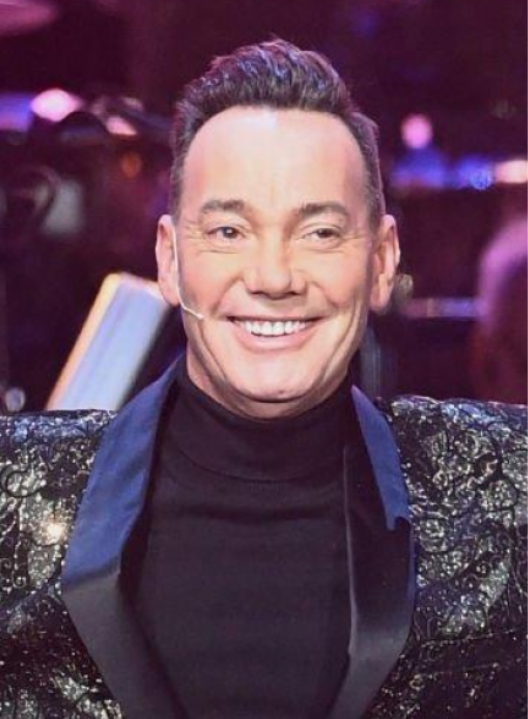
Craig Revel Horwood

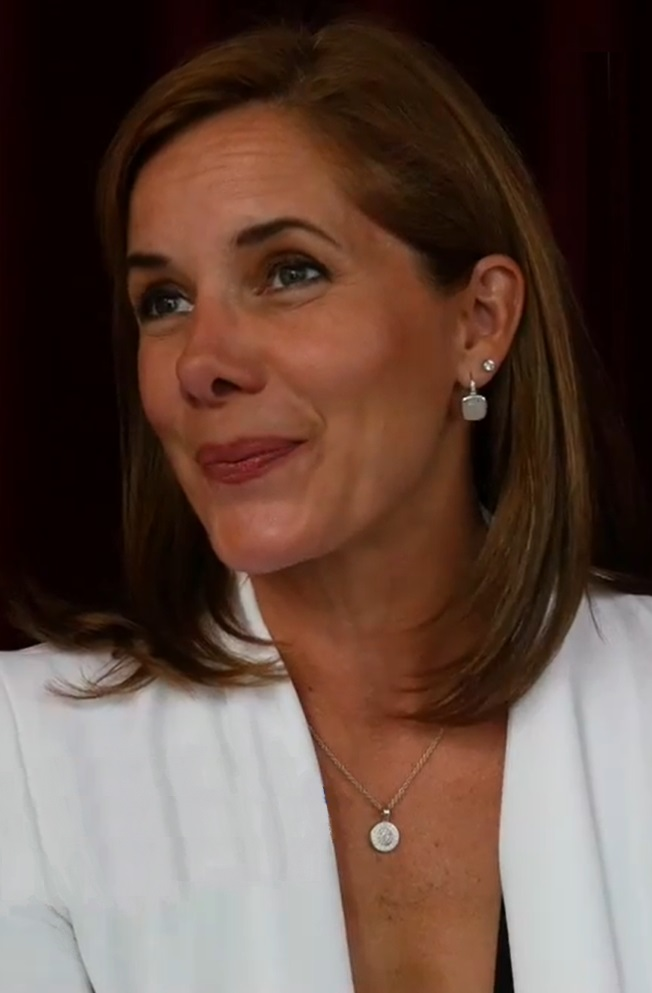
Darcey Bussell

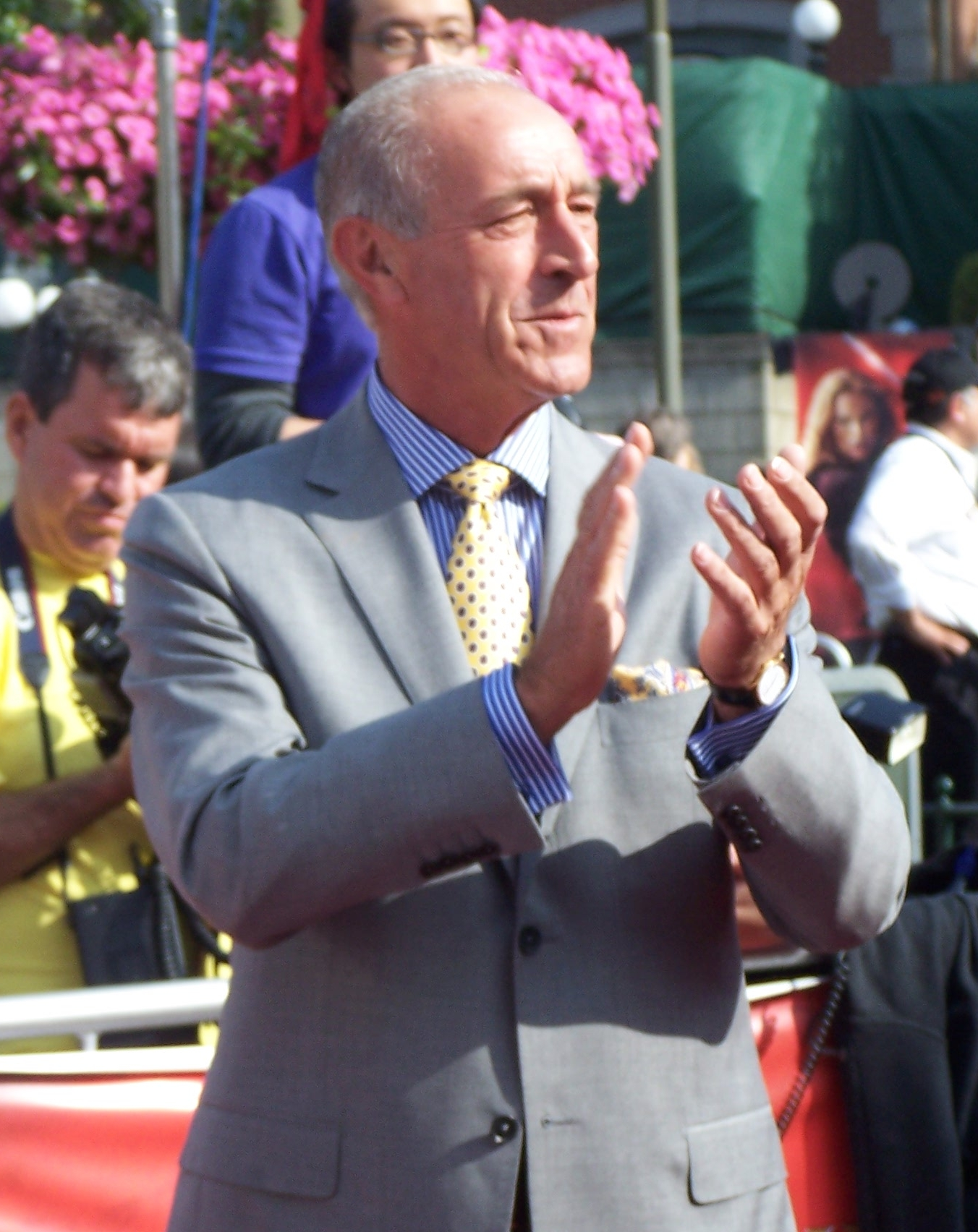
Len Goodman

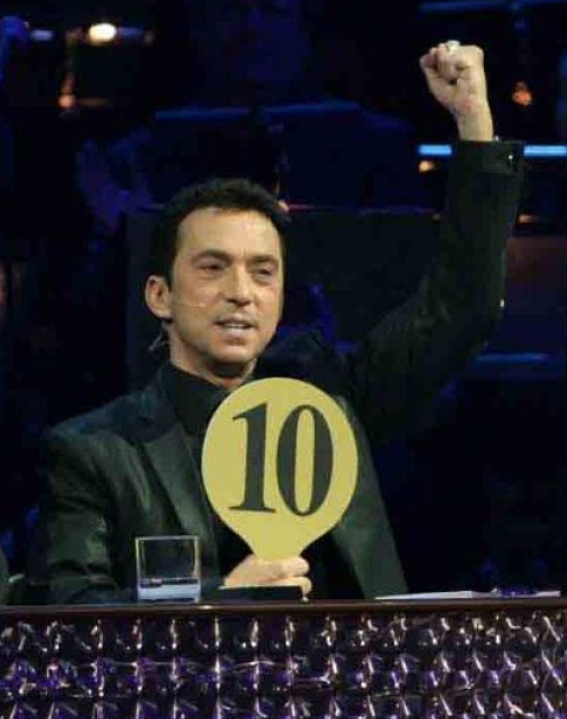
Bruno Tonioli

The couples dance each week in a live show. The judges score each performance out of ten. The couples are then ranked according to the judges' scores and given points according to their rank, with the lowest scored couple receiving one point, and the highest scored couple receiving the most points (the maximum number of points available depends on the number of couples remaining in the competition). The public are also invited to vote for their favourite couples, and the couples are ranked again according to the number of votes they receive, again receiving points; the couple with the fewest votes receiving one point, and the couple with the most votes receiving the most points.

The points for judges' score and public vote are then added together, and the two couples with the fewest points are placed in the bottom two. If two couples have equal points, the points from the public vote are given precedence. As with the previous series, the bottom two couples have to perform a dance-off on the results show. Based on that performance alone, each judge then votes on which couple should stay and which couple should leave, with Len Goodman, as head judge, having the last and deciding vote.

== Professional dancers ==
On 28 June 2016, the list of professionals who were returning for the fourteenth series was revealed. Professionals from the last series who did not return included Ola Jordan, Tristan MacManus, Kristina Rihanoff, Gleb Savchenko, and Aliona Vilani. They were replaced by Katya Jones and her husband Neil Jones, Burn the Floor dancer Gorka Márquez, former Dancing with the Stars troupe member Oksana Platero, and ex-Britain's Got Talent contestants AJ Pritchard and Chloe Hewitt. Chloe Hewitt and Neil Jones were not partnered with a celebrity, although they were on standby for any pro who might have been injured or unable to compete, and also performed in group dances and appeared on the Strictly companion programme, It Takes Two.

== Couples ==
This series featured fifteen celebrity contestants. On 8 August 2016, former Shadow Chancellor Ed Balls was announced as the first celebrity contestant, with more celebrities being announced throughout the month. The line up was completed on 22 August on The One Show.

On 11 October, Will Young announced that he was leaving the show for "personal reasons".

Celebrity	Notability	Professional partner	Status
Melvin Odoom	Television & radio presenter	Janette Manrara	Eliminated 1st on 2 October 2016
Tameka Empson	EastEnders actress	Gorka Márquez	Eliminated 2nd on 9 October 2016
Will Young	Singer-songwriter & actor	Karen Clifton	Withdrew on 11 October 2016
Naga Munchetty	BBC Breakfast newsreader & journalist	Pasha Kovalev	Eliminated 3rd on 16 October 2016
Lesley Joseph	Stage & screen actress	Anton Du Beke	Eliminated 4th on 23 October 2016
Anastacia	Singer-songwriter	Brendan Cole; Gorka Márquez (Week 5)	Eliminated 5th on 30 October 2016
Laura Whitmore	Television presenter	Giovanni Pernice	Eliminated 6th on 6 November 2016
Daisy Lowe	Fashion model	Aljaž Škorjanec	Eliminated 7th on 13 November 2016
Greg Rutherford	Olympic long jumper	Natalie Lowe	Eliminated 8th on 20 November 2016
Ed Balls	Labour Party politician	Katya Jones	Eliminated 9th on 27 November 2016
Judge Rinder	Criminal law barrister & television judge	Oksana Platero	Eliminated 10th on 4 December 2016
Claudia Fragapane	Olympic artistic gymnast	AJ Pritchard	Eliminated 11th on 11 December 2016
Danny Mac	Hollyoaks actor	Oti Mabuse	Runners-up on 17 December 2016
Louise Redknapp	Eternal singer & television presenter	Kevin Clifton	Runners-up on 17 December 2016
Ore Oduba	BBC Sport presenter	Joanne Clifton	Winners on 17 December 2016

== Scoring chart ==
The highest score each week is indicated in bold green with a dagger (†), while the lowest score each week is indicated in italicized red with a double-dagger (‡).

Color key:

Winners
Runners-up
Bottom two
Excused from competition for the week
Withdrew from competition
Eliminated

Strictly Come Dancing (series 14) - Weekly scores
Couple	Pl.	Week													
Couple	Pl.	1	2	1+2	3	4	5	6	7	8	9	10	11	12	13
Ore & Joanne	1st	27	27	54	35	**39**†	**36**†	32	34 (Note: This couple was in the bottom two, but was not eliminated.)	35	38	36+4=40	36	38+39=**77**†	39+40+40=**119**† (Note: This couple finished in first place.)
Danny & Oti	2nd	31	**32**†	**63**†	**36**†	36	35	30	38	**38**†	**40**†	40+5=**45**†	**38**†	37+39=76	36+40+40=116‡ (Note: This couple finished in second place.)
Louise & Kevin	2nd	31	**32**†	**63**†	31	33	33	35	**39**†	37	38	39+6=**45**†	37	37+36=73‡	38+38+40=116‡
Claudia & AJ	4th	26	30	56	**36**†	30	32	**36**†	33	36	36	36+3=39	37	35+38=73‡ (Note: This couple was eliminated.)	
Judge Rinder & Oksana	5th	25	27	52	27	27	29	32	33	33	33	29+2=31	31‡		
Ed & Katya	6th	21‡	23	44‡	24‡	16‡	18‡	26	27‡	25‡	23‡	23+1=24‡			
Greg & Natalie	7th	27	26	53	32	28	24	26	32	31	32				
Daisy & Aljaž	8th	**32**†	30	62	31	31	32	33	34	31					
Laura & Giovanni	9th	25	**32**†	57	30	33	(Note: This couple was excused from competition due to illness or injury, and was granted a bye to the following week.)	**36**†	32						
Anastacia & Brendan	10th	28	22‡	50	27	27	30	25‡							
Lesley & Anton	11th	23	26	49	27	31	24								
Naga & Pasha	12th	23	23	46	25	24									
Will & Karen	13th	30	27	57	31	(Note: This couple withdrew from the competition.)									
Tameka & Gorka	14th	26	29	55	28										
Melvin & Janette	15th	22	23	45											

=== Average chart ===
This table only counts for dances scored on a traditional 40-point scale.

Couple	Rank by average	Total points	Number of dances	Total average
Danny & Oti	1st	586	16	36.6
Louise & Kevin	2nd	574	16	35.9
Ore & Joanne	3rd	571	16	35.7
Claudia & AJ	4th	441	13	33.9
Daisy & Aljaž	5th	254	8	31.8
Laura & Giovanni	6th	188	6	31.3
Judge Rinder & Oksana	7th	326	11	29.6
Will & Karen	8th	88	3	29.3
Greg & Natalie	9th	258	9	28.7
Tameka & Gorka	10th	85	3	27.7
Anastacia & Brendan	11th	159	6	26.5
Lesley & Anton	12th	131	5	26.2
Naga & Pasha	13th	95	4	23.8
Ed & Katya	14th	226	10	22.6
Melvin & Janette	15th	45	2	22.5

== Weekly scores ==
Unless indicated otherwise, individual judges scores in the charts below (given in parentheses) are listed in this order from left to right: Craig Revel Horwood, Darcey Bussell, Len Goodman, Bruno Tonioli.

=== Week 1 ===
Six of the couples performed on the first night and the other nine couples performed on the second night. There was no elimination this week; all scores and votes carried over to the following week. Couples are listed in the order they performed.

Night 1 (Friday)

Couple	Scores	Dance	Music
Laura & Giovanni	25 (5, 6, 7, 7)	Cha-cha-cha	"Venus" — Shocking Blue
Naga & Pasha	23 (5, 6, 6, 6)	Waltz	"Run to You" — Whitney Houston
Judge Rinder & Oksana	25 (6, 7, 6, 6)	Cha-cha-cha	"Mercy" — Duffy
Lesley & Anton	23 (5, 6, 6, 6)	Waltz	"What'll I Do" — Alison Krauss
Ore & Joanne	27 (7, 7, 6, 7)	Tango	"Geronimo" — Sheppard
Greg & Natalie	27 (6, 7, 7, 7)	Jive	"Get Ready" — The Temptations

Night 2 (Saturday)

Couple	Scores	Dance	Music
Louise & Kevin	31 (8, 7, 8, 8)	Jive	"Jump, Jive an' Wail" — The Brian Setzer Orchestra
Melvin & Janette	22 (4, 6, 6, 6)	Cha-cha-cha	"Loco in Acapulco" — Four Tops
Daisy & Aljaž	32 (7, 8, 9, 8)	Waltz	"Unforgettable" — Nat King Cole
Danny & Oti	31 (8, 8, 7, 8)	Cha-cha-cha	"Cake by the Ocean" — DNCE
Tameka & Gorka	26 (6, 6, 7, 7)	Paso doble	"Y Viva España" — Sylvia
Anastacia & Brendan	28 (8, 7, 7, 6)	Cha-cha-cha	"Lady Marmalade" — from Moulin Rouge!
Ed & Katya	21 (5, 5, 6, 5)	Waltz	"Are You Lonesome Tonight?" — Elvis Presley
Claudia & AJ	26 (6, 6, 7, 7)	Cha-cha-cha	"What Makes You Beautiful" — One Direction
Will & Karen	30 (8, 8, 7, 7)	Tango	"Let's Dance" — David Bowie

=== Week 2 ===
Musical guest: Barry Gibb — "In the Now"

Due to an injury, Anastacia & Brendan were unable to participate in the dance-off. Therefore, the couple with the fewest public votes were eliminated. Couples are listed in the order they performed.

Couple	Scores	Dance	Music	Result
Ore & Joanne	27 (6, 7, 7, 7)	Cha-cha-cha	"Hot Stuff" — Donna Summer	Safe
Claudia & AJ	30 (6, 8, 8, 8)	Waltz	"You Light Up My Life" — Whitney Houston	Safe
Will & Karen	27 (5, 7, 8, 7)	Jive	"Rock Around the Clock" — Bill Haley & His Comets	Safe
Lesley & Anton	26 (6, 7, 7, 6)	Cha-cha-cha	"Perhaps, Perhaps, Perhaps" — The Pussycat Dolls	Safe
Greg & Natalie	26 (6, 7, 6, 7)	Tango	"Jump" — Van Halen	Safe
Tameka & Gorka	29 (7, 7, 7, 8)	Charleston	"Yes Sir, That's My Baby" — Firehouse Five Plus Two	Safe
Laura & Giovanni	32 (8, 8, 8, 8)	Waltz	"If I Ain't Got You" — Alicia Keys	Safe
Melvin & Janette	23 (5, 6, 6, 6)	Tango	"Moving on Up" — M People	Eliminated
Louise & Kevin	32 (8, 8, 8, 8)	Viennese waltz	"Hallelujah" — k.d. lang	Safe
Anastacia & Brendan	22 (4, 6, 6, 6)	Salsa	"Sax" — Fleur East	Bottom two
Ed & Katya	23 (3, 7, 6, 7)	Charleston	"The Banjo's Back in Town" — Alma Cogan	Safe
Naga & Pasha	23 (4, 6, 6, 7)	Cha-cha-cha	"A Fool in Love" — Ike & Tina Turner	Safe
Judge Rinder & Oksana	27 (6, 7, 7, 7)	American Smooth	"Marvin Gaye" — Charlie Puth, feat. Meghan Trainor	Safe
Daisy & Aljaž	30 (7, 8, 7, 8)	Cha-cha-cha	"Forget You" — CeeLo Green	Safe
Danny & Oti	32 (8, 8, 8, 8)	Viennese waltz	"Never Tear Us Apart" — INXS	Safe

=== Week 3: Movie Week ===
Musical guests: Alfie Boe & Michael Ball — "Somewhere" (from West Side Story)

Couples are listed in the order they performed.

Couple	Scores	Dance	Music	Film	Result
Daisy & Aljaž	31 (7, 8, 8, 8)	Quickstep	"A Spoonful of Sugar"	Mary Poppins	Safe
Anastacia & Brendan	27 (6, 7, 7, 7)	Viennese waltz	"A Thousand Years"	The Twilight Saga: Breaking Dawn – Part 1	Safe
Danny & Oti	36 (9, 9, 9, 9)	Paso doble	"The Train/El Sombrero Blanco"	The Mask of Zorro	Safe
Lesley & Anton	27 (6, 7, 7, 7)	Quickstep	"A Couple of Swells"	Easter Parade	Safe
Will & Karen	31 (8, 8, 7, 8)	Salsa	"Jai Ho! (You Are My Destiny)"	Slumdog Millionaire	Safe
Naga & Pasha	25 (5, 6, 7, 7)	Tango	"Theme from Mission: Impossible"	Mission: Impossible	Safe
Judge Rinder & Oksana	27 (7, 8, 6, 6)	Charleston	"Meet the Flintstones"	The Flintstones	Safe
Ore & Joanne	35 (8, 9, 9, 9)	American Smooth	"Singin' in the Rain"	Singin' in the Rain	Safe
Laura & Giovanni	30 (7, 7, 7, 9)	Salsa	"Rhythm of the Night"	Moulin Rouge!	Bottom two
Greg & Natalie	32 (8, 8, 8, 8)	American Smooth	"(Everything I Do) I Do It for You"	Robin Hood: Prince of Thieves	Safe
Claudia & AJ	36 (9, 9, 9, 9)	Charleston	"You Give a Little Love"	Bugsy Malone	Safe
Tameka & Gorka	28 (6, 7, 7, 8)	Tango	"The Heat Is On"	Beverly Hills Cop	Eliminated
Ed & Katya	24 (4, 6, 7, 7)	Samba	"Cuban Pete"	The Mask	Safe
Louise & Kevin	31 (7, 8, 8, 8)	Cha-cha-cha	"Flashdance... What a Feeling"	Flashdance	Safe

Judges' votes to save

- Horwood: Laura & Giovanni
- Bussell: Tameka & Gorka
- Tonioli: Laura & Giovanni
- Goodman: Laura & Giovanni

=== Week 4 ===
Musical guest: Madness — "Mr. Apples"

Will Young withdrew from the competition earlier in the week for personal reasons.

Couples are listed in the order they performed.

Couple	Scores	Dance	Music	Result
Greg & Natalie	28 (7, 7, 7, 7)	Salsa	"Wrapped Up" — Olly Murs	Safe
Laura & Giovanni	33 (8, 8, 8, 9)	Quickstep	"The Ballroom Blitz" — Sweet	Safe
Anastacia & Brendan	27 (6, 7, 7, 7)	Rumba	"The Way We Were" — Barbra Streisand	Bottom two
Claudia & AJ	30 (6, 8, 8, 8)	Foxtrot	"I Really Like You" — Carly Rae Jepsen	Safe
Ed & Katya	16 (2, 5, 5, 4)	Paso doble	"Holding Out for a Hero" — Bonnie Tyler	Safe
Naga & Pasha	24 (5, 6, 7, 6)	Charleston	"Minnie the Mermaid" — Firehouse Five Plus Two	Eliminated
Louise & Kevin	33 (8, 8, 8, 9)	Foxtrot	"Tears Dry on Their Own" — Amy Winehouse	Safe
Danny & Oti	36 (9, 9, 9, 9)	Quickstep	"I Won't Dance" — Fred Astaire	Safe
Daisy & Aljaž	31 (7, 8, 8, 8)	Rumba	"Careless Whisper" — George Michael	Safe
Judge Rinder & Oksana	27 (6, 7, 7, 7)	Viennese waltz	"Boom Bang-a-Bang" — Lulu	Safe
Lesley & Anton	31 (7, 8, 8, 8)	Charleston	"Won't You Charleston with Me?" — from The Boy Friend	Safe
Ore & Joanne	39 (9, 10, 10, 10)	Jive	"Runaway Baby" — Bruno Mars	Safe

Judges' votes to save

- Horwood: Anastacia & Brendan
- Bussell: Anastacia & Brendan
- Tonioli: Anastacia & Brendan
- Goodman: Did not vote, but would have voted to save Anastacia & Brendan

=== Week 5 ===
Musical guest: LeAnn Rimes — "How to Kiss a Boy"

Brendan Cole was unable to dance due to illness; Anastacia performed with Gorka Márquez instead.

Laura Whitmore suffered an ankle injury during rehearsals and was unable to perform on the live show. Under the rules of the show, she was granted a bye to the following week.

Couples are listed in the order they performed.

Couple	Scores	Dance	Music	Result
Judge Rinder & Oksana	29 (6, 8, 8, 7)	Jive	"Boogie Woogie Bugle Boy" — The Andrews Sisters	Safe
Lesley & Anton	24 (5, 6, 7, 6)	Tango	"Whatever Lola Wants" — Gotan Project	Eliminated
Greg & Natalie	24 (4, 6, 7, 7)	Cha-cha-cha	"We Found Love" — Rihanna, feat. Calvin Harris	Safe
Anastacia & Gorka	30 (7, 7, 8, 8)	Quickstep	"My Kind of Town" — Frank Sinatra	Safe
Louise & Kevin	33 (8, 8, 8, 9)	Rumba	"Always on My Mind" — Michael Bublé	Safe
Ed & Katya	18 (2, 6, 6, 4)	American Smooth	"Is This the Way to Amarillo" — Tony Christie	Safe
Ore & Joanne	36 (9, 9, 9, 9)	Waltz	"I Will Always Love You" — Claudia Streza	Safe
Daisy & Aljaž	32 (8, 8, 8, 8)	Charleston	"Happy Feet" — The Manhattan Rhythm Kings	Bottom two
Danny & Oti	35 (8, 9, 9, 9)	Rumba	"How Will I Know" — Sam Smith	Safe
Claudia & AJ	32 (8, 7, 8, 9)	Samba	"Young Hearts Run Free" — Candi Staton	Safe

Judges' votes to save

- Horwood: Daisy & Aljaž
- Bussell: Daisy & Aljaž
- Tonioli: Daisy & Aljaž
- Goodman: Did not vote, but would have voted to save Daisy & Aljaž

=== Week 6: Halloween Week ===
Musical guest: Laura Mvula — "Ready or Not"

Couples are listed in the order they performed.

Couple	Scores	Dance	Music	Result
Louise & Kevin	35 (8, 9, 9, 9)	Charleston	"Crazy in Love" — Emeli Sandé	Safe
Judge Rinder & Oksana	32 (8, 8, 8, 8)	Paso doble	"Born This Way" — Lady Gaga	Safe
Claudia & AJ	36 (9, 9, 9, 9)	American Smooth	"Black Magic" — Little Mix	Safe
Anastacia & Brendan	25 (4, 7, 7, 7)	Jive	"Bat Out of Hell" — Meat Loaf	Eliminated
Danny & Oti	30 (7, 8, 7, 8)	Foxtrot	"Take Me to Church" — Hozier	Safe
Laura & Giovanni	36 (9, 9, 9, 9)	Tango	"Paint It Black" — The Rolling Stones	Safe
Ore & Joanne	32 (6, 8, 9, 9)	Charleston	"I Want Candy" — Bow Wow Wow	Safe
Greg & Natalie	26 (4, 7, 7, 8)	Rumba	"Bring Me to Life" — Evanescence	Safe
Daisy & Aljaž	33 (8, 8, 8, 9)	Paso doble	"Don't Let Me Be Misunderstood" — Santa Esmeralda	Bottom two
Ed & Katya	26 (4, 7, 7, 8)	Cha-cha-cha	"Love Potion No. 9" — Hansel Martinez	Safe

Judges' votes to save

- Horwood: Daisy & Aljaž
- Bussell: Daisy & Aljaž
- Tonioli: Daisy & Aljaž
- Goodman: Did not vote, but would have voted to save Daisy & Aljaž

=== Week 7 ===
Musical guest: Gary Barlow — "Dare"

Couples are listed in the order they performed.

Couple	Scores	Dance	Music	Result
Danny & Oti	38 (9, 10, 9, 10)	Jive	"Long Tall Sally" — Cagey Strings Band	Safe
Daisy & Aljaž	34 (8, 8, 9, 9)	Viennese waltz	"Daisy Bell" — Harry Dacre	Safe
Ore & Joanne	34 (8, 8, 9, 9)	Salsa	"Turn the Beat Around" — Vicki Sue Robinson	Bottom two
Ed & Katya	27 (6, 7, 7, 7)	Quickstep	"Help!" — The Beatles	Safe
Laura & Giovanni	32 (7, 8, 8, 9)	Samba	"Bamboléo" — Gipsy Kings	Eliminated
Judge Rinder & Oksana	33 (8, 9, 8, 8)	Quickstep	"It Don't Mean a Thing (If It Ain't Got That Swing)" — Chantz Powell	Safe
Louise & Kevin	39 (9, 10, 10, 10)	Argentine tango	"Tanguera" — Sexteto Mayor	Safe
Greg & Natalie	32 (8, 8, 8, 8)	Viennese waltz	"You Don't Own Me" — Grace	Safe
Claudia & AJ	33 (8, 8, 8, 9)	Paso doble	"Shut Up and Dance" — Walk the Moon	Safe

Judges' votes to save

- Horwood: Ore & Joanne
- Bussell: Ore & Joanne
- Tonioli: Ore & Joanne
- Goodman: Did not vote, but would have voted to save Ore & Joanne

=== Week 8 ===
Musical guest: André Rieu and his Orchestra — "Hallelujah"

Couples are listed in the order they performed.

Couple	Scores	Dance	Music	Result
Daisy & Aljaž	31 (7, 8, 8, 8)	Salsa	"Groove Is in the Heart" — Deee-Lite	Eliminated
Greg & Natalie	31 (7, 8, 8, 8)	Paso doble	"Tamacun" — Rodrigo y Gabriela	Bottom two
Judge Rinder & Oksana	33 (7, 9, 9, 8)	Foxtrot	"You Make Me Feel So Young" — Frank Sinatra	Safe
Ore & Joanne	35 (8, 9, 9, 9)	Rumba	"Ordinary People" — John Legend	Safe
Ed & Katya	25 (4, 7, 8, 6)	Salsa	"Gangnam Style" — Psy	Safe
Claudia & AJ	36 (9, 9, 9, 9)	Viennese waltz	"Breakaway" — Kelly Clarkson	Safe
Danny & Oti	38 (9, 9, 10, 10)	Argentine tango	"I Heard It Through the Grapevine" — Marvin Gaye	Safe
Louise & Kevin	37 (9, 9, 9, 10)	American Smooth	"Big Spender" — Shirley Bassey	Safe

Judges' votes to save

- Horwood: Greg & Natalie
- Bussell: Greg & Natalie
- Tonioli: Daisy & Aljaž
- Goodman: Greg & Natalie

=== Week 9: Blackpool Week ===
Musical guests:

- Simple Minds — "Don't You (Forget About Me)"
- Rick Astley — "Dance"

This week's episode was staged in the Tower Ballroom at the Blackpool Tower in Blackpool, Lancashire. Couples are listed in the order they performed.

Couple	Scores	Dance	Music	Result
Claudia & AJ	36 (9, 9, 9, 9)	Jive	"Mickey" — Toni Basil	Bottom two
Ore & Joanne	38 (8, 10, 10, 10)	Viennese waltz	"That's Life" — Frank Sinatra	Safe
Louise & Kevin	38 (9, 9, 10, 10)	Paso doble	"Explosive" — Bond	Safe
Danny & Oti	40 (10, 10, 10, 10)	Charleston	"Puttin' On the Ritz" — Gregory Porter	Safe
Ed & Katya	23 (4, 6, 7, 6)	Jive	"Great Balls of Fire" — Jerry Lee Lewis	Safe
Greg & Natalie	32 (8, 8, 8, 8)	Quickstep	"Born to Hand Jive" — Sha Na Na	Eliminated
Judge Rinder & Oksana	33 (8, 9, 8, 8)	Salsa	"Spice Up Your Life" — Spice Girls	Safe

Judges' votes to save

- Horwood: Claudia & AJ
- Bussell: Claudia & AJ
- Tonioli: Claudia & AJ
- Goodman: Did not vote, but would have voted to save Claudia & AJ

=== Week 10 ===
Musical guest: Ellie Goulding — "Still Falling for You"

Each couple performed one routine, and then all couples participated in a cha-cha-cha marathon for additional points. Couples are listed in the order they performed.

Couple	Scores	Dance	Music	Result
Danny & Oti	40 (10, 10, 10, 10)	Samba	"Magalenha" — Sérgio Mendes, feat. Carlinhos Brown	Safe
Ore & Joanne	36 (8, 9, 9, 10)	Paso doble	"Everybody Wants to Rule the World" — Lorde	Safe
Louise & Kevin	39 (9, 10, 10, 10)	Waltz	"At This Moment" — Michael Bublé	Safe
Judge Rinder & Oksana	29 (6, 8, 8, 7)	Rumba	"Lean on Me" — Bill Withers	Bottom two
Ed & Katya	23 (4, 6, 7, 6)	Tango	"(I Can't Get No) Satisfaction" — The Rolling Stones	Eliminated
Claudia & AJ	36 (9, 9, 9, 9)	Argentine tango	"Cry Me a River" — Justin Timberlake	Safe
Ed & Katya	1	Cha-Cha-Challenge (Cha-cha-cha Marathon)	"I Like It Like That" — Pete Rodriguez	
Judge Rinder & Oksana	2	Cha-Cha-Challenge (Cha-cha-cha Marathon)	"I Like It Like That" — Pete Rodriguez	
Claudia & AJ	3	Cha-Cha-Challenge (Cha-cha-cha Marathon)	"I Like It Like That" — Pete Rodriguez	
Ore & Joanne	4	Cha-Cha-Challenge (Cha-cha-cha Marathon)	"I Like It Like That" — Pete Rodriguez	
Danny & Oti	5	Cha-Cha-Challenge (Cha-cha-cha Marathon)	"I Like It Like That" — Pete Rodriguez	
Louise & Kevin	6	Cha-Cha-Challenge (Cha-cha-cha Marathon)	"I Like It Like That" — Pete Rodriguez	

Judges' votes to save

- Horwood: Judge Rinder & Oksana
- Bussell: Judge Rinder & Oksana
- Tonioli: Judge Rinder & Oksana
- Goodman: Did not vote, but would have voted to save Judge Rinder & Oksana

=== Week 11: Musicals Week (Quarter-final) ===
Musical guest: Elaine Paige — "Don't Cry for Me Argentina" (from Evita)

Couples are listed in the order they performed.

Couple	Scores	Dance	Music	Musical	Result
Ore & Joanne	36 (9, 9, 9, 9)	Foxtrot	"Pure Imagination"	Charlie and the Chocolate Factory	Bottom two
Judge Rinder & Oksana	31 (7, 8, 8, 8)	Samba	"December, 1963 (Oh, What a Night)"	Jersey Boys	Eliminated
Louise & Kevin	37 (9, 9, 9, 10)	Quickstep	"The Deadwood Stage (Whip-Crack-Away!)"	Calamity Jane	Safe
Claudia & AJ	37 (9, 9, 9, 10)	Salsa	"I Just Can't Wait to Be King"	The Lion King	Safe
Danny & Oti	38 (9, 10, 9, 10)	Tango	"One Night Only"	Dreamgirls	Safe

Judges' votes to save

- Horwood: Ore & Joanne
- Bussell: Ore & Joanne
- Tonioli: Ore & Joanne
- Goodman: Did not vote, but would have voted to save Ore & Joanne

=== Week 12: Semi-final ===
Musical guest: Sting — "One Fine Day"

Each couple performed two routines. Couples are listed in the order they performed.

Couple	Scores	Dance	Music	Result
Louise & Kevin	37 (9, 9, 9, 10)	Tango	"Glad All Over" — The Dave Clark Five	Safe
Louise & Kevin	36 (9, 9, 9, 9)	Samba	"Aquarela do Brasil" — Thiago Thomé	Safe
Danny & Oti	37 (9, 9, 9, 10)	Salsa	"Vivir Mi Vida" — Marc Anthony	Bottom two
Danny & Oti	39 (10, 9, 10, 10)	American Smooth	"Misty Blue" — Dorothy Moore	Bottom two
Claudia & AJ	35 (8, 9, 9, 9)	Rumba	"Bleeding Love" — Leona Lewis	Eliminated
Claudia & AJ	38 (9, 9, 10, 10)	Quickstep	"When You're Smiling" — Andy Williams	Eliminated
Ore & Joanne	38 (8, 10, 10, 10)	Quickstep	"Are You Gonna Be My Girl" — Jet	Safe
Ore & Joanne	39 (9, 10, 10, 10)	Argentine tango	"Can't Get You Out of My Head" — Kylie Minogue	Safe

Judges' votes to save

- Horwood: Danny & Oti
- Bussell: Danny & Oti
- Tonioli: Danny & Oti
- Goodman: Did not vote, but would have voted to save Danny & Oti

=== Week 13: Final ===
Musical guest: Emeli Sandé — "Highs & Lows"

Each couple performed three routines: one chosen by the judges, their showdance routine, and their favourite dance of the series. Couples are listed in the order they performed.

Couple	Scores	Dance	Music	Result
Ore & Joanne	39 (9, 10, 10, 10)	American Smooth	"Singin' in the Rain" — from Singin' in the Rain	Winners
Ore & Joanne	40 (10, 10, 10, 10)	Showdance	"I Got Rhythm" — George Gershwin & Ira Gershwin	Winners
Ore & Joanne	40 (10, 10, 10, 10)	Jive	"Runaway Baby" — Bruno Mars	Winners
Louise & Kevin	38 (9, 9, 10, 10)	Cha-cha-cha	"Flashdance... What a Feeling" — from Flashdance	Runners-up
Louise & Kevin	38 (9, 9, 10, 10)	Showdance	"One Moment in Time" — Whitney Houston	Runners-up
Louise & Kevin	40 (10, 10, 10, 10)	Argentine tango	"Tanguera" — Sexteto Mayor	Runners-up
Danny & Oti	36 (9, 9, 9, 9)	Quickstep	"I Won't Dance" — Fred Astaire	Runners-up
Danny & Oti	40 (10, 10, 10, 10)	Showdance	"Set Fire to the Rain" — Adele	Runners-up
Danny & Oti	40 (10, 10, 10, 10)	Samba	"Magalenha" — Sérgio Mendes, feat. Carlinhos Brown	Runners-up

== Dance chart ==
The couples performed the following each week:

- Weeks 1–9: One unlearned dance
- Week 10: One unlearned dance & cha-cha-cha marathon
- Week 11 (Quarter-final): One unlearned dance
- Week 12 (Semi-final): Two unlearned dances
- Week 13 (Final): Judges' choice, showdance & favourite dance of the series

Strictly Come Dancing (series 14) - Dance chart
Couple	Week																
Couple	1	2	3	4	5	6	7	8	9	10		11	12		13		
Ore & Joanne	Tango	Cha-cha-cha	American Smooth	Jive	Waltz	Charleston	Salsa	Rumba	Viennese waltz	Paso doble	Cha-cha-cha; Marathon	Foxtrot	Quickstep	Argentine tango	American Smooth	Showdance	Jive
Danny & Oti	Cha-cha-cha	Viennese waltz	Paso doble	Quickstep	Rumba	Foxtrot	Jive	Argentine tango	Charleston	Samba	Cha-cha-cha; Marathon	Tango	Salsa	American Smooth	Quickstep	Showdance	Samba
Louise & Kevin	Jive	Viennese waltz	Cha-cha-cha	Foxtrot	Rumba	Charleston	Argentine tango	American Smooth	Paso doble	Waltz	Cha-cha-cha; Marathon	Quickstep	Tango	Samba	Cha-cha-cha	Showdance	Argentine tango
Claudia & AJ	Cha-cha-cha	Waltz	Charleston	Foxtrot	Samba	American Smooth	Paso doble	Viennese waltz	Jive	Argentine tango	Cha-cha-cha; Marathon	Salsa	Rumba	Quickstep			
Judge Rinder & Oksana	Cha-cha-cha	American Smooth	Charleston	Viennese waltz	Jive	Paso doble	Quickstep	Foxtrot	Salsa	Rumba	Cha-cha-cha; Marathon	Samba					
Ed & Katya	Waltz	Charleston	Samba	Paso doble	American Smooth	Cha-cha-cha	Quickstep	Salsa	Jive	Tango	Cha-cha-cha; Marathon						
Greg & Natalie	Jive	Tango	American Smooth	Salsa	Cha-cha-cha	Rumba	Viennese waltz	Paso doble	Quickstep								
Daisy & Aljaž	Waltz	Cha-cha-cha	Quickstep	Rumba	Charleston	Paso doble	Viennese waltz	Salsa									
Laura & Giovanni	Cha-cha-cha	Waltz	Salsa	Quickstep		Tango	Samba										
Anastacia & Brendan	Cha-cha-cha	Salsa	Viennese waltz	Rumba	Quickstep	Jive											
Lesley & Anton	Waltz	Cha-cha-cha	Quickstep	Charleston	Tango												
Naga & Pasha	Waltz	Cha-cha-cha	Tango	Charleston													
Will & Karen	Tango	Jive	Salsa	Viennese waltz													
Tameka & Gorka	Paso doble	Charleston	Tango														
Melvin & Janette	Cha-cha-cha	Tango															

== Ratings ==
Weekly ratings for each show on BBC One. All ratings are provided by BARB.

Episode	Date	Official rating (millions)	Weekly rank for BBC One	Weekly rank for all UK TV	Share
Launch show	3 September	10.43	2	2	46.4%
Week 1 (Night 1)	23 September	9.30	3	3	34.4%
Week 1 (Night 2)	24 September	10.13	2	2	44.9%
Week 2	1 October	10.61	2	2	44.6%
Week 2 results	2 October	8.97	3	3	36.6%
Week 3	8 October	11.00	2	2	44.8%
Week 3 results	9 October	9.74	3	3	41.1%
Week 4	15 October	11.21	2	2	46.3%
Week 4 results	16 October	9.86	3	3	42.2%
Week 5	22 October	11.21	2	2	45.5%
Week 5 results	23 October	10.51	3	3	42.8%
Week 6	29 October	11.22	2	2	44.8%
Week 6 results	30 October	9.93	3	3	36.9%
Week 7	5 November	11.43	2	2	46.2%
Week 7 results	6 November	10.81	3	3	42.5%
Week 8	12 November	11.31	3	4	45.4%
Week 8 results	13 November	11.37	2	3	44.7%
Week 9	19 November	12.24	1	1	47.9%
Week 9 results	20 November	11.03	3	4	41.2%
Week 10	26 November	11.65	2	2	47.6%
Week 10 results	27 November	11.11	3	3	44.1%
Week 11	3 December	11.92	1	2	49.1%
Week 11 results	4 December	11.39	3	4	44.6%
Week 12	10 December	11.34	2	2	46.5%
Week 12 results	11 December	11.46	1	1	43.7%
Week 13	17 December	13.30	1	1	53.5%
Series average (excl. launch show)	2016	10.96	—N/a	—N/a	44.1%
