= Kevin Clifton =

English dancer (born 1982)

- Born: Kevin James Clifton; 13 October 1982 (age 44); Waltham, Grimsby, England
- Education: Caistor Grammar School
- Occupations: Dancer; actor
- Known for: Strictly Come Dancing (2013–2019)
- Spouses: Anna Melnikova (m. 2003; div. 2005); Clare Craze (m. 2006; div. 2013); Karen Hauer (m. 2015; div. 2018)
- Partner: Stacey Dooley (2019–present)
- Children: 1
- Family: Joanne Clifton (sister)

Kevin James Clifton (born 13 October 1982) is an English professional dancer and actor, who was a professional dancer on the BBC TV series Strictly Come Dancing, having previously worked as an assistant choreographer. He has also featured on the live dance show Burn the Floor. He was given the nickname "Kevin from Grimsby" by Bruce Forsyth.

Clifton appeared on Strictly Come Dancing from 2013 to 2019, appearing in every final except series fifteen and seventeen. Clifton won the sixteenth series with his celebrity partner Stacey Dooley, with whom he has been in a relationship since 2019. In March 2020, Clifton announced that he would not be returning to Strictly, stating that he wanted to focus on "other areas of his career."

Since leaving Strictly, Clifton has appeared in multiple stage productions including the UK tours of Strictly Ballroom and Chicago.

== Early life ==
Clifton started dancing ballroom and Latin as a child in his home village of Waltham, in the town of Grimsby, taught by his parents, former World Champions Keith and Judy Clifton.

He competed nationally and internationally as a child initially partnering his sister Joanne. Later, when they both chose to move on to different partners he chose Latin as his primary dance style so as not to directly compete against his sister. He later became Youth World Number 1 in Latin.

== Dance ==
Clifton is a four-time British Latin Champion and won 14 International Open titles in Italy, Germany, Spain, Portugal, Sweden, Japan, France, Hong Kong, Taiwan, Singapore, Slovenia, Slovakia, Finland and Belgium. At the time of his retirement from competitive dancing in 2007, he was ranked 7th in the world.

From January 2008 to June 2013, Clifton and his future wife Karen Hauer were principal dancers of the Burn The Floor Dance Company, performing in the show's record breaking Broadway run, as well as starring at the Shaftesbury Theatre in London's West End. They rejoined Burn The Floor as principal dancers for a short tour of Australia and Japan in Spring 2014.

In August 2017, Kevin and Karen Clifton announced they would be touring the UK again in 2018 with their theatre tour 'Kevin and Karen Dance', following their first nationwide tour in 2017.

== Strictly Come Dancing ==
=== Highest and lowest scoring performances per dance ===
Dance	Partner	Highest	Partner	Lowest
American Smooth	Kellie Bright	39	Susan Calman	21
Argentine Tango	Louise	40	Susanna Reid	32
Cha-Cha-Cha	Louise	38	Anneka Rice	14
Charleston	Kellie Bright; Stacey Dooley	39	Anneka Rice	11
Dance A Thon	Louise	6	Susanna Reid Susan Calman	`1
Foxtrot	Stacey Dooley	39	Susan Calman	18
Freestyle	Kellie Bright	40	Susanna Reid; Stacey Dooley	36
Jive	Frankie Bridge	36	Susanna Reid	28
Paso Doble	Frankie Bridge; Stacey Dooley; Susanna Reid	39	Susan Calman	25
Quickstep	Frankie Bridge; Louise; Kellie Bright; Susanna Reid	37	Stacey Dooley	24
Rumba	Frankie Bridge; Kellie Bright	34	Louise	33
Salsa	Frankie Bridge; Kellie Bright	34	Susanna Reid	32
Samba	Frankie Bridge	39	Susan Calman	20
Street/Commercial	Stacey Dooley	36		
Tango	Kellie Bright	40	Kellie Bright; Susan Calman	27
Viennese Waltz	Frankie Bridge	38	Susan Calman	20
Waltz	Louise	39	Anneka Rice	19

In 2013, Clifton appeared on series 11 of Strictly Come Dancing and was partnered with Susanna Reid. He had previously auditioned for the show with his partner Karen Hauer, but they had only needed a female dancer at the time, so he was instead employed as a choreographer for the show in 2012. In the 2013 Blackpool performance of the show, he was joined in the opening dance by his family. On the same show, Reid and Clifton scored 39/40 for their paso doble, putting them at the top of the leaderboard. He won the 2013 Strictly Come Dancing Pro Challenge becoming the Guinness World Records holder for most Drunken Sailors in 30 seconds The couple's popularity ensured they reached the final, on 21 December, where they finished as runners up with Natalie Gumede behind model Abbey Clancy.

In 2014's series 12 of Strictly Come Dancing Clifton was paired with pop star Frankie Bridge. They were declared the runners-up with Simon Webbe beaten by Caroline Flack and Pasha Kovalev. In 2015, Clifton, recently married to co-professional dancer Karen Hauer, returned for the thirteenth series of the show and was partnered up with EastEnders actress Kellie Bright. Bright and Clifton scored a perfect 40 for their Tango and Showdance and eventually finished as joint runners up with Georgia May Foote and Giovanni Pernice.

Clifton has also taken part in the 'Strictly live tour'. For the 2014 tour he continued his partnership with series 11 partner, Susanna Reid. He was due to dance again with Frankie Bridge for the 2015 tour, but she had to pull out due to pregnancy, he instead danced with series 6 contestant Rachel Stevens. Clifton and Bridge were however reunited for the 2016 tour.

In 2016, Clifton again took part in Strictly Come Dancing, where he partnered Eternal singer and media personality Louise Redknapp, AKA Louise. On 17 December 2016, Clifton became the first professional dancer in the show's history to compete in four consecutive finals; he was also the only professional dancer not to be in the dance-off. For the fourth time, Clifton finished as a series runner-up, after he and Redknapp lost out in the final result to Ore Oduba and Ore's partner (Kevin's sister), Joanne.

For series 15 in 2017, Clifton was partnered with Scottish comedian Susan Calman. They were eliminated on week 10, after a dance-off against Alexandra Burke and Gorka Márquez. This was the first time Clifton did not make it to the final.

For series 16, in 2018, Clifton was partnered with English television presenter and journalist, Stacey Dooley. The couple were the series winners.

He partnered TV host Anneka Rice for series 17, in 2019, they were the second couple to be eliminated after the judges chose to save David James and Nadiya Bychkova; making this Clifton's shortest series to date. He did however return to dance with former footballer Alex Scott for weeks 6 & 7 while Scott's normal partner Neil Jones was recovering from an injury to his calf muscle. Following this series, Clifton chose to quit the show to "focus on other projects".

Series	Celebrity partner	Place	Average Score
11	Susanna Reid	2nd	33.8
12	Frankie Bridge	2nd	35.1
13	Kellie Bright	2nd	34.1
14	Louise	2nd	35.9
15	Susan Calman	7th	23.3
16	Stacey Dooley	1st	34.0
17	Anneka Rice	14th	14.7

=== Series 11 with celebrity partner Susanna Reid ===
Week #	Dance/Song	Judges' score				Total	Result
Week #	Dance/Song	Horwood	Bussell	Goodman	Tonioli	Total	Result
1	Jive / "Shake a Tail Feather"	6	7	8	7	28	No Elimination
2	Tango / "Locked out of Heaven"	7	8	8	8	31	Safe
3	Viennese waltz / "Annie's Song"	8	9	9	8	34	Safe
4	Samba / "Whenever, Wherever"	6	7	8	8	29	Safe
5	American Smooth / "On the Sunny Side of the Street"	8	8	8	8	32	Safe
6	Charleston / "Bad Moon Rising"	8	8	9	9	34	Safe
7	Waltz / "You Light Up My Life"	9	9	9	9	36	Safe
8	Paso doble / "Les Toreadors"	9	10	10	10	39	Safe
9	Cha-cha-cha / "Hound Dog"	7	8	8	8	31	Safe
10	Quickstep / "Good Morning"	7	8	9	9	33	Safe
11	Argentine tango / "Smooth Criminal"	8	8	8	8	32	Safe
12	Foxtrot / "Can't Take My Eyes Off You"	9	9	10	10	38	Safe
12	Salsa / "Move Your Feet"	8	8	8	8	32	Safe
13	Quickstep / "Good Morning"	8	9	10	10	37	Runners-up
13	Freestyle / "Your Song"	9	9	9	9	36	Runners-up
13	Paso doble / "Les Toreadors"	9	10	10	10	39	Runners-up

=== Series 12 with celebrity partner Frankie Bridge ===
Week #	Dance/Song	Judges' score				Total	Result
Week #	Dance/Song	Horwood	Bussell	Goodman	Tonioli	Total	Result
1	Waltz / "Someone like You"	7	7	8	8	30	No Elimination
2	Charleston / "Happy Days"	7	7	8	8	30	Safe
3	Paso doble / "America"	8	9	9	9	35^{1}	Safe
4	Cha-cha-cha / "Call Me Maybe"	8	8	8	8	32	Safe
5	Foxtrot / "Daydream Believer"	8	8	8	8	32	Safe
6	Tango / "Defying Gravity"	9	9	9	10	37	Safe
7	Samba / "La Bamba"	7	8	9	8	32	Safe
8	Quickstep / "Town Called Malice"	8	9	10	10	37	Safe
9	Viennese waltz / "What's New Pussycat?"	9	9	10	10	38	Safe
10	Jive / "Surfin' USA"	9	9	9	9	36	Safe
11	Salsa / "Work"	8	9	8	9	34	Safe
12	Rumba / "Somewhere Only We Know"	7	8	9	10	34	Safe
12	Argentine tango / "The 5th"	9	9	10	10	38	Safe
13	Samba / "La Bamba"	9	10	10	10	39	Runners-up
13	Freestyle / "Get Happy"	9	9	10	10	38	Runners-up
13	Paso doble / "America"	9	10	10	10	39	Runners-up

^{1} Week 3 featured Donny Osmond as a guest judge, he scored Frankie and Kevin a 10, making their official total 45

=== Series 13 with celebrity partner Kellie Bright ===
Week #	Dance/Song	Judges' score				Total	Result
Week #	Dance/Song	Horwood	Bussell	Goodman	Tonioli	Total	Result
1	Tango / "You Really Got Me"	6	7	7	7	27	No Elimination
2	Cha-cha-cha / "Don't Go Breaking My Heart"	6	7	7	7	27	Safe
3	Charleston / "Cantina Band"	8	8	8	8	32	Safe
4	Foxtrot / "Dream a Little Dream of Me"	8	8	8	8	32	Safe
5	Jive / "One Way or Another"	8	9	9	9	35	Safe
6	Paso doble / "School's Out"	7	7	7	7	28	Safe
7	Waltz / "Love Ain't Here Anymore"	8	8	8	8	32	Bottom Two
8	Samba / "Boom! Shake the Room"	9	8	7	9	33	Safe
9	Quickstep / "9 to 5"	9	9	9	10	37	Safe
10	Salsa / "I Want You Back"	8	8	9	9	34	Bottom Two
11	Viennese waltz / "Oom-Pah-Pah"	9	9	9	9	36	Safe
12	Rumba / "Songbird"	9	8	9	8	34	Safe
12	American Smooth / "Let's Face the Music and Dance"	9	10	10	10	39	Safe
13	Tango / "You Really Got Me"	10	10	10	10	40	Runners-up
13	Freestyle / "The Ding-Dong Daddy of the D-Car Line"	10	10	10	10	40	Runners-up
13	Charleston / "Cantina Band"	9	10	10	10	39	Runners-up

=== Series 14 with celebrity partner Louise ===
Week #	Dance/Song	Judges' score				Total	Result
Week #	Dance/Song	Horwood	Bussell	Goodman	Tonioli	Total	Result
1	Jive / "Jump, Jive an' Wail"	8	7	8	8	31	No Elimination
2	Viennese waltz / "Hallelujah"	8	8	8	8	32	Safe
3	Cha-cha-cha / "Flashdance... What a Feeling"	7	8	8	8	31	Safe
4	Foxtrot / "Tears Dry on Their Own"	8	8	8	9	33	Safe
5	Rumba / "Always on My Mind"	8	8	8	9	33	Safe
6	Charleston / "Crazy in Love"	8	9	9	9	35	Safe
7	Argentine tango / "Tanguera"	9	10	10	10	39	Safe
8	American Smooth / "Big Spender"	9	9	9	10	37	Safe
9	Paso doble / "Explosive"	9	9	10	10	38	Safe
10	Waltz / "At This Moment"	9	10	10	10	39	Safe
11	Quickstep / "The Deadwood Stage (Whip-Crack-Away!)"	9	9	9	10	37	Safe
12	Tango / "Glad All Over"; Samba / "Aquarela do Brasil"	9; 9	9; 9	9; 9	10; 9	37; 36	Safe
13	Cha-cha-cha / "Flashdance... What a Feeling"; Freestyle / "One Moment in Time"; Argentine tango / "Tanguera"	9; 9; 10	9; 9; 10	10; 10; 10	10; 10; 10	38; 38; 40	Runners-up

=== Series 15 with celebrity partner Susan Calman ===
Week #	Dance/Song	Judges' score				Total	Result
Week #	Dance/Song	Horwood	Bussell	Ballas	Tonioli	Total	Result
1	Viennese waltz / "Mad About the Boy"	5	5	5	5	20	No Elimination
2	Charleston / "If You Knew Susie"	3	6	7	6	22	Safe
3	Samba / "Wonder Woman Theme"	4	5	5	6	20	Safe
4	Quickstep / "Bring Me Sunshine"	7	7	8	8	30	Safe
5	Cha-cha-cha / "Shout Out to My Ex"	4	5	7	N/A^{1}	16^{1}	Safe
6	Foxtrot / "Killer Queen"	3	5	5	5	18	Safe
7	Jive / "This Ole House"	6	7	8	8	29	Safe
8	Tango / "Firework"	5	6	8	8	27	Safe
9	Paso doble / "Scott & Fran's Paso Doble"	5	6	7	7	25	Safe
10	American Smooth / "Beyond the Sea"	4	6	5	6	21	Eliminated

^{1} In Week 5, Bruno Tonioli took a week off the show due to his work schedule.

=== Series 16 with celebrity partner Stacey Dooley ===
Week #	Dance/Song	Judges' score				Total	Result
Week #	Dance/Song	Horwood	Bussell	Ballas	Tonioli	Total	Result
1	Quickstep / "Dancing"	6	6	6	6	24	No Elimination
2	Cha-cha-cha / "Came Here for Love"	4	5	5	6	20	Safe
3	Jive / "Happy"	8	8	8	8	32	Safe
4	Foxtrot / "Hi Ho Silver Lining"	8	8	8	9	33	Safe
5	Samba / "Tequila"	8	7	9	9^{1}	33	Safe
6	Tango / "Doctor Who theme"	8	9	9	9	35	Safe
7	Street/Commercial / "Empire State of Mind (Part II) Broken Down"	9	9	9	9	36	Safe
8	Waltz / "Moon River"	8	8	8	8	32	Safe
9	Salsa / "Ooh Aah... Just a Little Bit"	7	8	9	9	33	Safe
10	Paso doble / "Malagueña"	9	10	10	10	39	Safe
11	American Smooth / "I Dreamed a Dream"	9	9	10	10	38	Safe
12	Charleston / "Five Foot Two, Eyes of Blue"; Viennese waltz / "You're My World"	9; 8	10; 9	10; 10	10; 9	39; 36	Safe
13	Foxtrot / "Hi Ho Silver Lining"; Freestyle / "Land of 1000 Dances"; Paso doble / "Malagueña"	9; 8; 9	10; 9; 10	10; 9; 10	10; 10; 10	39; 36; 39	Winners

^{1}Alfonso Ribeiro stood as a guest judge in place of Bruno Tonioli

=== Series 17 with celebrity partners Anneka Rice ===
Week No.	Dance/Song	Judges' score				Total	Result
Week No.	Dance/Song	Horwood	Mabuse	Ballas	Tonioli	Total	Result
1	Cha-cha-cha / "Gloria"	3	4	3	4	14	No Elimination
2	Waltz / "Run to You"	4	5	5	5	19	Safe
3	Charleston / "Woo-Hoo"	2	3	3	3	11	Eliminated

== Stage career ==
In 2010, Clifton made his musical theatre debut in Dirty Dancing The Musical at the Aldwych Theatre in London's West End, where he partnered BBC1's So You Think You Can Dance winner, Charlie Bruce.

Clifton played Stacee Jaxx in the 2018–19 UK Tour of Rock of Ages. From March to April 2022, he starred as the Artilleryman in the tour of Jeff Wayne's musical version of The War of the Worlds. In September 2022, he starred as Scott Hastings in the UK Tour of Strictly Ballroom directed by Strictly Judge Craig Revel Horwood. In 2023, Clifton appeared in Aladdin for a Pantomime run set for six-weeks at Canterbury's Marlowe Theatre.

Clifton starred as Billy Flynn in the 2024–25 UK tour of Chicago.

Year	Title	Role	Venue
2010	Dirty Dancing the Musical	Ensemble	Aldwych Theatre, London
2018–19	Rock of Ages	Stacee Jaxx	UK tour
2022	The War of the Worlds	Artilleryman	UK tour
2022	Strictly Ballroom	Scott Hastings	UK tour
2023	Aladdin (pantomime)	Abanazer	Marlowe Theatre, Canterbury
2024–25	Chicago	Billy Flynn	UK tour
2025	2:22 A Ghost Story	Sam	UK tour
2026	Priscilla Queen of the Desert The Musical	Tick/Mitzi	UK Tour

== Personal life ==
Clifton grew up in the small North East Lincolnshire village of Waltham, attending the East Ravendale Primary school, where he was notable for his Michael Jackson impressions. He later attended Caistor Grammar School, doing well academically before choosing to pursue his dance career rather than attend the sixth form.

Clifton has been married three times. His first marriage was to a dance partner when he was 20 years old. He then married professional dancer Clare Craze. They split up in 2010, and their divorce was finalised in 2013. He then married fellow professional dancer Karen Hauer, having proposed to her on her birthday, on stage during a performance of Burn the Floor. They wed on 11 July 2015. On 15 March 2018, Clifton confirmed he and Karen Hauer were no longer together romantically.

In 2019, it was confirmed that Clifton was dating his most recent Strictly Come Dancing celebrity partner Stacey Dooley. In January 2023, Dooley gave birth to their daughter.

In June 2023, Clifton appeared on BBC One's Who Do You Think You Are?, where he discovered he was a direct descendant of Matooskie, an Indigenous Canadian woman.

Clifton is a supporter of Scunthorpe United.

== Business career ==
Clifton currently owns a property investment business with a friend, describing it in an interview as a 'second career'.

== Philanthropy ==
As well as taking part in various charity campaigns and visits in his role as a Strictly professional, Clifton is also a patron of the Wheelchair DanceSport Association and the 2014 Dance Proms. In September 2023, Clifton donated £1,050 to help pay staff wages at financially troubled Scunthorpe United.
