= Ever to Excel =

English translation of an Ancient Greek phrase

"Ever to Excel" is the English translation of the Ancient Greek phrase 'αἰὲν ἀριστεύειν' aièn aristeúein. It has been used as motto by a number of educational institutions.

== Origin and etymology ==
The phrase is derived from the sixth book of Homer's Iliad, in which it is used in a speech Glaucus delivers to Diomedes. During a battle between the Greeks and Trojans, Diomedes is impressed by the bravery of a mysterious young man and demands to know his identity. Glaucus replies: "Hippolochus begat me. I claim to be his son, and he sent me to Troy with strict instructions: Ever to excel, to do better than others, and to bring glory to your forebears, who indeed were very great ... This is my ancestry; this is the blood I am proud to inherit."

== Usage as a motto ==
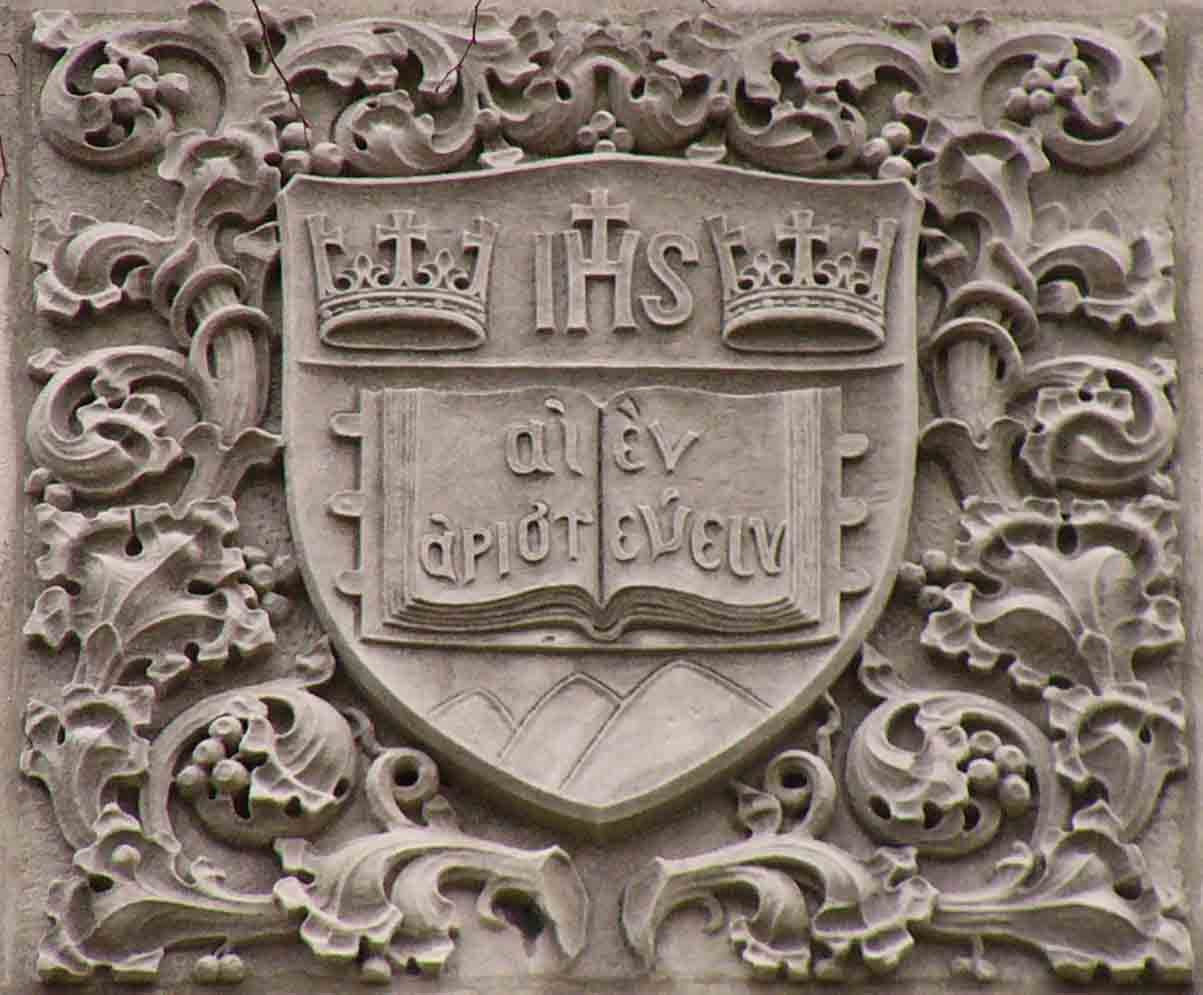
Engraving of the motto on Bapst Library at Boston College

It is the motto of the Hellenic National Defence General Staff. The phrase has also been used as the motto of a number of schools and universities, mainly in the United Kingdom, notably the University of St Andrews, but also in the United States and Canada. These include schools such as Caistor Grammar School, the Edinburgh Academy, Kelvinside Academy and Old Scona Academic High School, as well as Boston College.
