= Karen Hauer =

Venezuelan-American dancer (born 1982)

- Born: Karen Vanessa Girez Kardenez Andreas; 20 April 1982 (age 44); Valencia, Venezuela
- Occupation: Professional dancer
- Years active: 2009–present
- Television: So You Think You Can Dance; Strictly Come Dancing
- Spouses: Matthew Hauer (m. 2000; div. 2009) Kevin Clifton (m. 2015; div. 2018) Jordan Wyn-Jones (m. 2022; div. 2024)

Karen Hauer (formerly Clifton; born 20 April 1982) is a Venezuelan–American professional Latin dance specialist and World Mambo Champion, best known for appearing on the British television series Strictly Come Dancing. She was the longest-serving female professional dancer on the show, appearing from 2012 until 2025. She also featured on the American TV series So You Think You Can Dance and was a principal dancer in the touring live dance show Burn the Floor.

== So You Think You Can Dance ==
In 2009, Hauer auditioned for season 6 of the US reality show So You Think You Can Dance. She originally auditioned with her husband at the time, Matthew Hauer, but he was eliminated during Vegas week while Karen moved on to the top 20.

| Week | Partner | Style | Music | Choreographer(s) | Results |
|---|---|---|---|---|---|
| 1 | Kevin Hunte | Cha-Cha | "Push It"—Glee Cast | Tony Meredith and Melanie LaPatin | Safe |
| 2 | Kevin Hunte | Hip-Hop | "Ice Cream Paint Job"—Dorrough | Tabitha and Napoleon D'umo | Safe |
| 3 | Kevin Hunte | Hustle | "Come To Me"—France Joli | Maria Torres | Bottom 3 |
| 4 | Kevin Hunte | Broadway | "If My Friends Could See Me Now"—Christina Applegate | Spencer Liff | Bottom 3 |
| 5 | Victor Smalley | Tango | "Montserrat"— Orquesta del Plata | Tony Meredith and Melanie LaPatin | Eliminated |
| 5 | Victor Smalley | Hip-Hop | "Moving Mountains"—Usher | Laurie Ann Gibson | Eliminated |

== Strictly Come Dancing ==
Hauer joined Strictly Come Dancing as a professional dancer in 2012, partnering Westlife singer Nicky Byrne for the tenth series. They reached the quarter-finals in week 10, before losing the dance-off to Denise van Outen and her partner James Jordan.

Hauer returned for the eleventh series in 2013 to partner television chef Dave Myers; they were voted out of the competition in week 7, after losing the dance-off to Mark Benton and Iveta Lukosiute.

For the twelfth series, she was paired with television personality Mark Wright; they made it to the final, coming in 4th place.

For the thirteenth series, she was partnered with broadcaster Jeremy Vine; they were eliminated in Week 8 after losing a dance-off with Jamelia and Tristan MacManus.

For the fourteenth series in 2016, Hauer was paired with the singer Will Young, who withdrew from the competition after the third week.

In 2016, Hauer won the Children in Need Special with the taekwondo athlete Lutalo Muhammad. She danced with the celebrity chef Ainsley Harriott for the 2016 Christmas special.

In the fifteenth series in 2017, Hauer partnered television chef Simon Rimmer; they were eliminated in 11th place.

She was paired with actor Charles Venn for the sixteenth series in 2018; they reached the quarter-finals.

During the seventeenth series in 2019, Hauer was partnered with comedian Chris Ramsey; they reached the semi-final.

In the eighteenth series in 2020, she was partnered with Made in Chelsea star Jamie Laing, who returned after injuring his foot in the previous series. With Laing, Hauer reached the final for the second time.

For the nineteenth series in 2021, she was partnered with actor Greg Wise. The couple were eliminated in Week 4.

For the twentieth series in 2022, she was partnered with comedian Jayde Adams. The couple were eliminated in Week 5 after losing the dance off to Molly Rainford and Carlos Gu.

For the twenty-first series in 2023, she was partnered with comedian and DJ Eddie Kadi. The couple were eliminated in Week 5 after losing the dance off to Zara McDermott and Graziano Di Prima.

For the twenty-second series in 2024, she was partnered with footballer and pundit Paul Merson. The couple were eliminated in Week 5 after losing in the dance-off to JB Gill and Amy Dowden with all judges voting against them. She appeared in the 2024 Christmas special, dancing a charleston with Josh Widdicombe to the song "Let It Snow" while dressed as a penguin.

For the twenty-third series, she was paired with Harry Aikines-Aryeetey and the pair were the sixth couple to be eliminated.

In March 2026, it was announced that Hauer would be departing the show after 14 years, along with several other professional dancers, making her the longest serving female professional at the time of her departure. Speaking on her exit she said, "Strictly completely changed my life, not only as a performer and a teacher but as a human being. I’ve had the privilege of meeting so many incredible people and brilliant celebrity partners who have become close friends and people I admire so much."

Highest and lowest scoring performances per dance

| Dance | Partner | Highest | Partner | Lowest |
|---|---|---|---|---|
| American Smooth | Jayde Adams | 31 | Simon Rimmer | 16 |
| Argentine Tango | Nicky Byrne; Harry Aikines-Aryeetey | 30 | | |
| Cha Cha Cha | Mark Wright | 35 | Chris Ramsey | 13 |
| Charleston | Nicky Byrne; Mark Wright | 36 | Simon Rimmer | 21 |
| Couple's Choice | Jamie Laing (Street) | 39 | Greg Wise | 23 |
| Dance-a-thon | Charles Venn | 3 | Mark Wright | 2 |
| Foxtrot | Mark Wright | 35 | Chris Ramsey | 28 |
| Jive | Mark Wright | 35 | Dave Myers | 19 |
| Paso Doble | Chris Ramsey | 31 | Dave Myers | 16 |
| Quickstep | Jamie Laing | 32 | Simon Rimmer | 19 |
| Rumba | Charles Venn | 35 | Nicky Byrne | 25 |
| Salsa | Chris Ramsey | 33 | Paul Merson | 15 |
| Samba | Charles Venn | 38 | Greg Wise; Simon Rimmer; Paul Merson | 19 |
| Showdance | Jamie Laing | 39 | Mark Wright | 35 |
| Tango | Mark Wright; Jamie Laing | 32 | Dave Myers | 20 |
| Viennese Waltz | Mark Wright | 33 | Chris Ramsey | 26 |
| Waltz | Mark Wright | 31 | Nicky Byrne | 17 |

Eddie Kadi, Jeremy Vine and Will Young are the only celebrities not to appear on this list.

| Series | Partner | Place | Average Score |
|---|---|---|---|
| 10 | Nicky Byrne | 6th | 26.6 |
| 11 | Dave Myers | 10th | 18.3 |
| 12 | Mark Wright | 4th | 31.7 |
| 13 | Jeremy Vine | 9th | 20.3 |
| 14 | Will Young | 13th | 29.3 |
| 15 | Simon Rimmer | 11th | 18.5 |
| 16 | Charles Venn | 6th | 29.7 |
| 17 | Chris Ramsey | 4th | 26.2 |
| 18 | Jamie Laing | 2nd | 32.0 |
| 19 | Greg Wise | 12th | 23.0 |
| 20 | Jayde Adams | 12th | 27.4 |
| 21 | Eddie Kadi | 12th | 25.0 |
| 22 | Paul Merson | 12th | 18.6 |
| 23 | Harry Aikines-Aryeetey | 9th | 27.0 |

=== Series 10: with celebrity partner Nicky Byrne ===
| Week | Dance/Song | Judges' scores | | | | Total | Result |
| Week | Dance/Song | Horwood | Bussell | Goodman | Tonioli | Total | Result |
| 1 | Waltz / "I Wonder Why" | 2 | 5 | 5 | 5 | 17 | No elimination |
| 2 | Cha-cha-cha / "Dynamite" | 4 | 5 | 4 | 5 | 18 | Safe |
| 3 | Quickstep / "Hey Pachuco" | 6 | 7 | 7 | 7 | 27 | Safe |
| 4 | Tango / "Weird Science" | 6 | 6 | 7 | 7 | 26 | Safe |
| 5 | Rumba / "I Don't Wanna Miss A Thing" | 4 | 7 | 7 | 7 | 25 | Safe |
| 6 | Foxtrot / "The Best Is Yet to Come" | 7 | 7 | 8 | 8 | 30 | Safe |
| 7 | Jive / "Jailhouse Rock" | 6 | 8 | 8 | 8 | 30 | Bottom two |
| 8 | Charleston / "Doop" | 9 | 9 | 9 | 9 | 36 | Safe |
| 9 | Argentine Tango / "Skyfall" | 7 | 8 | 7 | 8 | 30 | Bottom two |
| 10 | American Smooth; Samba / "Troublemaker" | 5 | 7 | 8 | 7 | 27 | Eliminated |

=== Series 11: with celebrity partner Dave Myers ===
| Week | Dance/Song | Judges' scores | | | | Total | Result |
| Week | Dance/Song | Horwood | Bussell | Goodman | Tonioli | Total | Result |
| 1 | Cha-cha-cha / "Moves Like Jagger" | 2 | 5 | 5 | 4 | 16 | No elimination |
| 2 | American Smooth / "How D'Ya Like Your Eggs in the Morning?" | 3 | 5 | 5 | 4 | 17 | Safe |
| 3 | Paso Doble / "I'd Do Anything for Love (But I Won't Do That)" | 2 | 5 | 5 | 4 | 16 | Safe |
| 4 | Waltz / "Take It to the Limit" | 5 | 6 | 6 | 6 | 23 | Safe |
| 5 | Salsa / "Cuban Pete" | 3 | 5 | 5 | 4 | 17 | Safe |
| 6 | Jive / "Monster Mash" | 4 | 5 | 6 | 4 | 19 | Safe |
| 7 | Tango / "I'm Gonna Be (500 Miles)" | 4 | 6 | 6 | 4 | 20 | Eliminated |

=== Series 12: with celebrity partner Mark Wright ===
| Week | Dance/Song | Judges' scores | | | | | Total | Result |
| Week | Dance/Song | Horwood | Bussell | Osmond | Goodman | Tonioli | Total | Result |
| 1 | Cha-cha-cha / "I'm Your Man" | 5 | 7 | – | 6 | 6 | 24 | No elimination |
| 2 | American Smooth / "I'm Yours" | 6 | 7 | – | 7 | 7 | 27 | Safe |
| 3 | Paso Doble / "Superman Theme" | 6 | 6 | 9* | 7 | 7 | 35 | Safe |
| 4 | Quickstep / "Tiger Feet" | 7 | 7 | – | 7 | 8 | 29 | Bottom two |
| 5 | Samba / "That's the Way (I Like It)" | 8 | 9 | – | 8 | 8 | 33 | Safe |
| 6 | Jive / "Prologue (Little Shop of Horrors)" | 8 | 9 | – | 9 | 9 | 35 | Safe |
| 7 | Waltz / "Weekend In New England" | 7 | 8 | – | 8 | 8 | 31 | Safe |
| 8 | Charleston / "We No Speak Americano" | 9 | 9 | – | 9 | 9 | 36 | Safe |
| 9 | Tango / "Love Runs Out" | 8 | 8 | – | 8 | 8 | 32 | Safe |
| 10 | Salsa / "Viva Las Vegas" | 7 | 8 | – | 9 | 8 | 32 | Bottom two |
| 11 | Foxtrot / "L-O-V-E"; Waltz-a-thon / "The Last Waltz" | 8 Awarded | 9; 2 | – | 9 extra | 9 points | 35; 37 | Safe |
| 12 | Viennese Waltz / "I Got You Babe"; Rumba / "Fields of Gold" | 8; 9 | 8; 8 | – | 9; 8 | 8; 8 | 33; 33 | Bottom two |
| 13 | Cha-cha-cha / "I'm Your Man"; Showdance / "Don't Stop Me Now" | 8; 8 | 9; 9 | – | 9; 9 | 9; 9 | 35; 35 | Eliminated |

- Score awarded by guest judge Donny Osmond

=== Series 13: with celebrity partner Jeremy Vine ===
In 2015 she partnered BBC Radio 2 presenter Jeremy Vine, for the thirteenth series of the show.

| Week | Dance/Song | Judges' scores | | | | Total | Result |
| Week | Dance/Song | Horwood | Bussell | Goodman | Tonioli | Total | Result |
| 1 | Cha-cha-cha / "September" | 2 | 6 | 6 | 5 | 19 | No elimination |
| 2 | American Smooth / "Happy Together" | 3 | 5 | 5 | 4 | 17 | Safe |
| 3 | Charleston / "Top Hat, White Tie and Tails" | 3 | 7 | 7 | 7 | 24 | Safe |
| 4 | Jive / "Splish Splash" | 3 | 6 | 6 | 5 | 20 | Safe |
| 5 | Waltz / "She" | 3 | 5 | 6 | 4 | 18 | Safe |
| 6 | Salsa / "Thriller" | 4 | 6 | 6 | 6 | 22 | Safe |
| 7 | Tango / "Go West" | 4 | 6 | 6 | 5 | 21 | Safe |
| 8 | Quickstep / "Going Underground" | 4 | 6 | 6 | 5 | 21 | Eliminated |

=== Series 14: with celebrity partner Will Young ===
She partnered singer Will Young, for the fourteenth series of the show.

| Week | Dance/Song | Judges' scores | | | | Total | Result |
| Week | Dance/Song | Horwood | Bussell | Goodman | Tonioli | Total | Result |
| 1 | Tango / "Let's Dance" | 8 | 8 | 7 | 7 | 30 | No elimination |
| 2 | Jive / "Rock Around the Clock" | 5 | 7 | 8 | 7 | 27 | Safe |
| 3 | Salsa / "Jai Ho" | 8 | 8 | 7 | 8 | 31 | Safe |
| 4 | Viennese Waltz / "Say Something" | – | – | – | – | – | Withdrew |

=== Series 15: with celebrity partner Simon Rimmer ===
She partnered chef Simon Rimmer, for the fifteenth series of the show.

| Week | Dance/Song | Judges' scores | | | | Total | Result |
| Week | Dance/Song | Horwood | Bussell | Ballas | Tonioli | Total | Result |
| 1 | Paso Doble / "Song 2" | 3 | 5 | 5 | 4 | 17 | No Elimination |
| 2 | Waltz / "You'll Never Walk Alone" | 4 | 4 | 6 | 5 | 19 | Safe |
| 3 | Quickstep / "You've Got a Friend in Me" | 3 | 5 | 6 | 5 | 19 | Bottom two |
| 4 | Samba / "Copacabana" | 4 | 5 | 5 | 5 | 19 | Safe |
| 5 | Charleston / "Fit as a Fiddle (And Ready for Love)" | 5 | 5 | 6 | – | 16 | Bottom two |
| 6 | American Smooth / "Delilah" | 2 | 5 | 5 | 4 | 16 | Eliminated |

=== Series 16: with celebrity partner Charles Venn ===
She partnered actor Charles Venn, for the sixteenth series of the show.

| Week | Dance/Song | Judges' scores | | | | Total | Result |
| Week | Dance/Song | Horwood | Bussell | Ballas | Tonioli | Total | Result |
| 1 | Cha-cha-cha / "Ain't No Love (Ain't No Use)" | 6 | 6 | 6 | 7 | 25 | No Elimination |
| 2 | Quickstep / "Sir Duke" | 5 | 6 | 7 | 7 | 25 | Safe |
| 3 | American Smooth / "Up Where We Belong" | 6 | 6 | 6 | 7 | 25 | Bottom Two |
| 4 | Salsa / "Use It Up and Wear It Out" | 6 | 6 | 6 | 7 | 25 | Bottom Two |
| 5 | Street / "Get Up Offa That Thing" | 9 | 9 | 9 | 9* | 36 | Safe |
| 6 | Jive / "Time Warp" | 6 | 6 | 6 | 7 | 25 | Safe |
| 7 | Viennese Waltz / "Piano Man" | 6 | 7 | 7 | 8 | 28 | Bottom Two |
| 8 | Charleston / "No Diggity" | 8 | 9 | 9 | 9 | 35 | Safe |
| 9 | Samba / "La Bamba" | 9 | 9 | 10 | 10 | 38 | Safe |
| 10 | Tango / "Eleanor Rigby"; Lindy Hop-a-thon / "Do Your Thing" | 6 Awarded | 8; 3 | 8 extra | 8 points | 30; 33 | Safe |
| 11 | Rumba / "Maria" | 8 | 9 | 9 | 9 | 35 | Eliminated |

- Score awarded by guest judge Alfonso Ribeiro

=== Series 17: with celebrity partner Chris Ramsey ===
She was partnered with comedian Chris Ramsey, for the seventeenth series. The couple reached the semi-final and finished fourth.

| Week | Dance/Song | Judges' score | | | | Total | Result |
| Week | Dance/Song | Craig R. Horwood | Motsi Mabuse | Shirley Ballas | Bruno Tonioli | Total | Result |
| 1 | Cha-cha-cha / "Juice" | 3 | 4 | 3 | 3 | 13 | No Elimination |
| 2 | Charleston / "Out of Our Heads" | 5 | 7 | 7 | 7 | 26 | Safe |
| 3 | American Smooth / "Cheek to Cheek" | 4 | 6 | 6 | 6 | 22 | Safe |
| 4 | Jive / "Saturday Night's Alright for Fighting" | 6 | 7 | 7 | 6 | 26 | Safe |
| 5 | Quickstep / "Let's Go Crazy" | 5 | 6 | 7 | 7* | 25 | Safe |
| 6 | Samba / "Everybody (Backstreet's Back)" | 5 | 6 | 6 | 6 | 23 | Safe |
| 7 | Street / "Let's Get Ready to Rhumble" | 8 | 9 | 9 | 8 | 34 | Safe |
| 8 | Tango / "Survivor" | 5 | 7 | 7 | 7 | 26 | Safe |
| 9 | Salsa / "Uptown Funk" | 7 | 8 | 9 | 9 | 33 | Safe |
| 10 | Paso Doble / "Run Boy Run" | 8 | 8 | 8 | 7 | 31 | Safe |
| 11 | Foxtrot / "Consider Yourself" | 6 | 7 | 8 | 7 | 28 | Bottom Two |
| 12 | Viennese Waltz / "Somebody to Love"; Rumba / "Don't Watch Me Cry" | 7; 4 | 7; 8 | 6; 8 | 6; 8 | 26; 28 | Eliminated |

- Score awarded by guest judge Alfonso Ribeiro

=== Series 18: with celebrity partner Jamie Laing ===
| Week | Dance/Song | Judges' scores | | | Total | Result |
| Week | Dance/Song | Horwood | Ballas | Mabuse | Total | Result |
| 1 | Cha-cha-cha / "Think About Things" | 4 | 5 | 5 | 14 | No elimination |
| 2 | American Smooth / "Night and Day" | 5 | 6 | 6 | 17 | Bottom Two |
| 3 | Charleston / "Zero to Hero" | 7 | 8 | 8 | 23 | Safe |
| 4 | Samba / "Bamboléo" | 8 | 8 | 9* | 25 | Safe |
| 5 | Street / "Gonna Make You Sweat (Everybody Dance Now)" | 9 | 10 | 10* | 29 | Safe |
| 6 | Tango / "Tanguera" | 8 | 8 | 8 | 24 | Bottom Two |
| 7 | Jive / "Everybody's Talking About Jamie" | 8 | 8 | 8 | 24 | Bottom Two |
| 8 | Salsa / "Last Dance"; Quickstep / "Thank God I'm a Country Boy" | 8; 8 | 8; 8 | 8; 8 | 24; 24 | Bottom Two |
| 9 | Charleston / "Zero to Hero"; Showdance / "I'm Still Standing"; Street / "Gonna Make You Sweat (Everybody Dance Now)" | 8; 9; 9 | 9; 10; 10 | 9; 10; 10 | 26; 29; 29 | Runner-up |

- Score awarded by Anton Du Beke

=== Series 19: with celebrity partner Greg Wise ===
| Week | Dance/Song | Judges' scores | | | | Total | Result |
| Week | Dance/Song | Horwood | Mabuse | Ballas | Du Beke | Total | Result |
| 1 | American Smooth / "That's Life" | 6 | 6 | 5 | 7 | 24 | No elimination |
| 2 | Couple's Choice / "If You Could Read My Mind" | 3 | 6 | 7 | 7 | 23 | Safe |
| 3 | Paso Doble / "James Bond Theme" | 6 | 6 | 7 | 7 | 26 | Safe |
| 4 | Samba / "Macarena" | 3 | 5 | 5 | 6 | 19 | Eliminated |

=== Series 20: with celebrity partner Jayde Adams ===
| Week | Dance/Song | Judges' scores | | | | Total | Result |
| Week | Dance/Song | Horwood | Mabuse | Ballas | Du Beke | Total | Result |
| 1 | Samba / "Dirrty" | 4 | 7 | 6 | 6 | 23 | No elimination |
| 2 | Tango / "Rumour Has It" | 6 | 7 | 6 | 7 | 26 | Safe |
| 3 | Cha-Cha-Cha / "Flashdance... What a Feeling" | 7 | 8 | 7 | 7 | 29 | Safe |
| 4 | American Smooth / "Wind Beneath My Wings" | 7 | 8 | 8 | 8 | 31 | Safe |
| 5 | Charleston / "The Ballard of Barry & Freda (Let's Do It)" | 6 | 7 | 7 | 8 | 28 | Eliminated |

=== Series 21: with celebrity partner Eddie Kadi ===
| Week | Dance/Song | Judges' scores | | | | Total | Result |
| Week | Dance/Song | Horwood | Mabuse | Ballas | Du Beke | Total | Result |
| 1 | Quickstep / "Two Hearts" | 4 | 6 | 6 | 6 | 22 | No elimination |
| 2 | Cha-cha-cha / "Rie y Llora" | 3 | 6 | 5 | 7 | 21 | Safe |
| 3 | Couple's Choice / "Theme from Men in Black" | 8 | 8 | 10 | 8 | 34 | Safe |
| 4 | American Smooth / "Sex Bomb" | 4 | 7 | 6 | 7 | 24 | Bottom two |
| 5 | Samba / "Calm Down" | 5 | 6 | 6 | 7 | 24 | Eliminated |

=== Series 22: with celebrity partner Paul Merson ===
| Week | Dance/Song | Judges' scores | | | | Total | Result |
| Week | Dance/Song | Horwood | Mabuse | Ballas | Du Beke | Total | Result |
| 1 | American Smooth / "Vindaloo" | 2 | 4 | 5 | 6 | 17 | No elimination |
| 2 | Salsa / "Fireball" | 2 | 4 | 4 | 5 | 15 | Safe |
| 3 | Cha-cha-cha / "The Magnificent Seven" | 3 | 5 | 5 | 6 | 19 | Bottom two |
| 4 | Quickstep / "I Won't Dance" | 4 | 6 | 6 | 7 | 23 | Safe |
| 5 | Samba / "Car Wash" | 3 | 5 | 5 | 6 | 19 | Eliminated |

- Red number indicates Paul and Karen were at the bottom of the leaderboard

=== Series 23: with celebrity partner Harry Aikines-Aryeetey ===
| Week | Dance/Song | Judges' scores | | | | Total | Result |
| Week | Dance/Song | Horwood | Mabuse | Ballas | Du Beke | Total | Result |
| 1 | Cha-cha-cha / "Push It" | 4 | 5 | 5 | 5 | 19 | No elimination |
| 2 | Quickstep / "Everybody Needs Somebody to Love" | 6 | 7 | 6 | 7 | 26 | Safe |
| 3 | Salsa / "I Always Wanted a Brother" | 8 | 8 | 8 | 8 | 32 | Safe |
| 4 | Rumba / “It Must Have Been Love” | 6 | 7 | 6 | 7 | 26 | Safe |
| 5 | Argentine Tango / “Caught Up” | 6 | 9 | 7 | 8 | 30 | Safe |
| 6 | American Smooth / “Mystical Magical” | 6 | 7 | 6 | 7 | 26 | Safe |
| 7 | Samba / “Samba” | 7 | 8 | 7 | 8 | 30 | Eliminated |

== Dance tours and other professional engagements ==
In August 2017, Karen and Kevin Clifton announced they would be touring the UK again in 2018 with their theatre tour, following the sell-out success of their first nationwide tour in 2017.

In October 2025, Hauer announced that she would be teaching and performing with Gorka Márquez at Donahey's 'Dancing with The Stars Weekends' in 2026.

Hauer has performed on the Strictly Come Dancing Live! tour several times, either with a partner or as an additional dancer.

In 2020, due to the COVID-19 pandemic, Hauer's 'Firedance' tour with Gorka Márquez was postponed after a number of performances.

== Personal life ==
Hauer was born Karen Vanessa Girez Kardenez Andreas, in Valencia, Venezuela, and took up dancing after moving to New York when she was aged eight. She studied at the Martha Graham School of Contemporary Dance, and then the High School of Performing Arts (otherwise known as "The Fame School"), majoring in ballet and contemporary dance before going on to study Ballroom and Latin at the age of 19.

Hauer was named World Mambo Champion in 2008, and Professional American Rhythm Rising Star Champion in 2009.

Hauer became the longest-serving female professional dancer on Strictly Come Dancing when she was confirmed to appear in her tenth series in 2021.

Hauer is a certified Personal Trainer and a health and fitness enthusiast, and in 2019 she launched her online fitness programme 'Hauer Power'.

Hauer has been married three times: first to former dance partner Matthew Hauer (until 2009), then to fellow professional dancer Kevin Clifton (2015–2018) and later to Jordan Wyn-Jones (2022–2024), whom she married at Chewton Glen. She is currently dating former rugby player Simon Davidson.
