= Cranfield Airport =

Airport in Bedfordshire, England

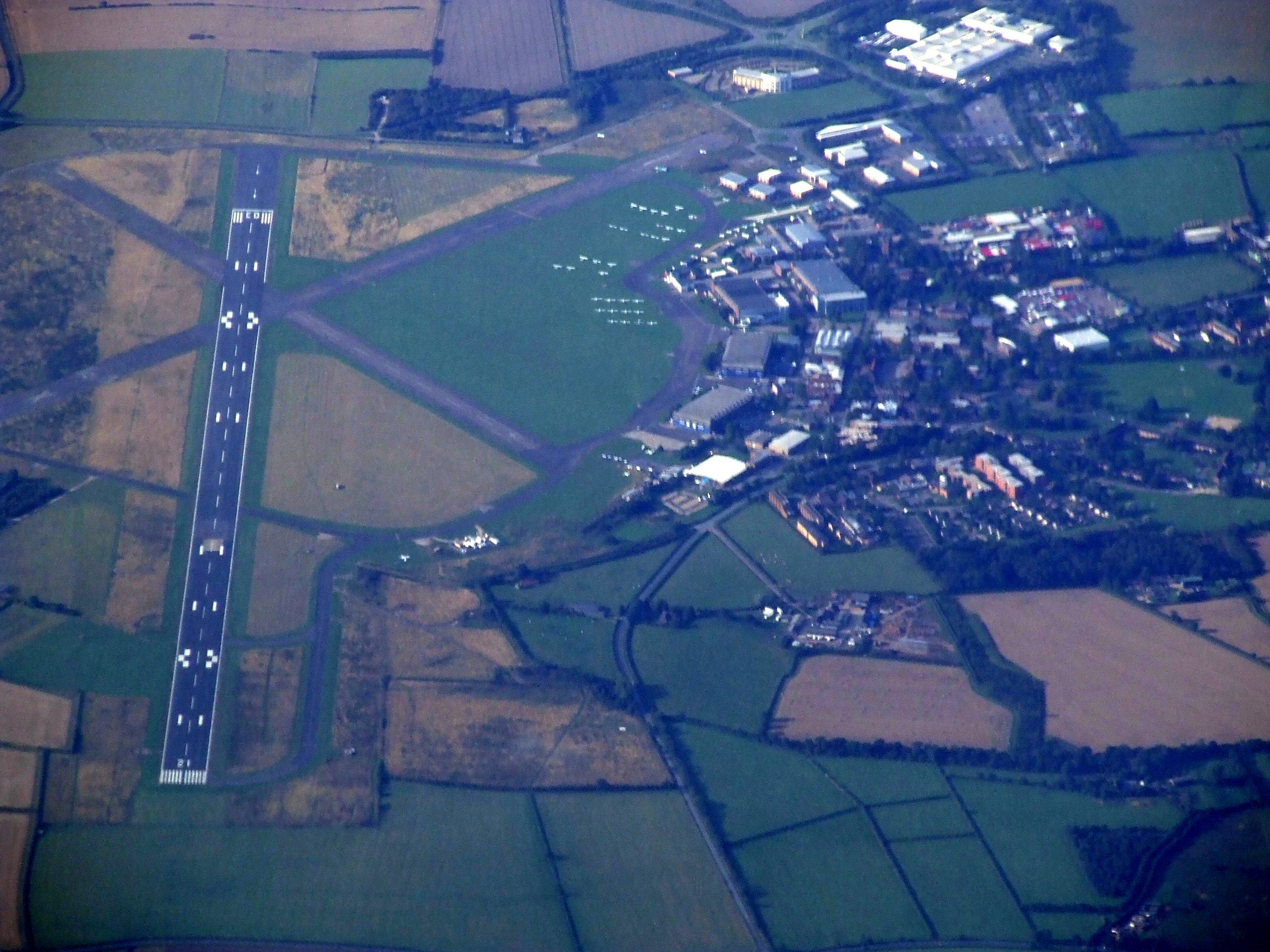
- IATA: none; ICAO: EGTC

Summary
- Airport type: Private, former RAF Station
- Owner: Cranfield University
- Operator: Cranfield University
- Serves: Bedfordshire, Milton Keynes, London
- Location: Cranfield, Bedfordshire, England
- Elevation AMSL: 358 ft (109 m)
- Coordinates: 52°04′20″N 000°37′00″W
- Website: londoncranfieldairport.co.uk

Maps
- Location in Bedfordshire
- Interactive map of Cranfield Airport

Runways
| Direction | Length | | Surface |
| Direction | m | ft | Surface |
|---|---|---|---|
| 03/21 | 1,799 | 5,902 | Asphalt |
- Sources: UK AIP at NATS

Cranfield Airport (ICAO: EGTC) is an airfield just outside the village of Cranfield, in Bedfordshire, England. It is about 12 miles (19 km) by road south-west of central Bedford and 7.5 miles (12.1 km) east of Milton Keynes city centre. It was originally a Second World War aerodrome, RAF Cranfield. It is now used for business aviation, private flights and for research and development activities. In July 2026 the airport was rebranded as London Cranfield Airport.

== History ==
RAF Cranfield was built by John Laing & Son on 100 acres (0.40 km^{2}) of farmland acquired by the Air Ministry in 1935 as Britain re-armed to face the growing threats on the continent. It was formally opened on 1 June 1937 and initially became the base for No. 62 Squadron RAF and No. 82 Squadron RAF of No. 1 (Bomber) Group, flying the already obsolete Hawker Hind biplanes.

Both squadrons converted to the Bristol Blenheim in 1938. 62 Squadron was moved to Singapore in August 1939 where it was destroyed by the invading Japanese Imperial forces. RAF Cranfield's grass airstrip was replaced with three hardened runways in the winter of 1939 and spring of 1940 and became a target for enemy action in the late summer of that year, with mines, bombs and incendiaries dropped on it and the nearby village of Cranfield.

Aircraftsman Vivian Hollowday, serving at the airfield, won the George Cross for the attempted rescue of two crews which crashed there in July and August 1940.

August 1941 saw the fast developing station become a night fighter training centre with the arrival of No. 51 Night fighter Operational Training Unit. This was disbanded after the end of the war in Europe in May 1945 and the airfield became the site for a new College of Aeronautics (now Cranfield University). This college helped develop the highly successful Hawker Siddeley Harrier V/STOL aircraft and has serviced the Hawker Hurricanes and Supermarine Spitfires of the Battle of Britain Memorial Flight. The UK's sole remaining airworthy Avro Lancaster was based at Cranfield until 1964.

The following squadrons were stationed at RAF Cranfield:

- No. 4 Squadron RAF (March 1943)
- No. 35 Squadron RAF (1939)
- No. 62 Squadron RAF (1937-39)
- No. 82 Squadron RAF (1937-39)
- No. 108 Squadron RAF (1937-38)
- No. 181 Squadron RAF (March 1943)
- No. 183 Squadron RAF (March 1943)
- No. 207 Squadron RAF (1939 & 1940)
- No. 239 Squadron RAF (1942)

The following units were also stationed here:

- No. 1 Group Pool RAF (September 1939)
- No. 2 Aircraft Delivery Flight RAF (July 1943 - July 1944)
- No. 14 Service Flying Training School RAF (April 1940 - August 1941)
- No. 16 Air Crew Holding Unit RAF
- No. 23 Group Communication Flight RAF (March 1950 - September 1959)
- No. 51 Operational Training Unit RAF (August 1941 - June 1945)
- No. 2807 Squadron RAF Regiment
- AI Conversion Flight RAF (October 1943 - January 1946)
- Empire Test Pilots School (October 1945 - July 1947)
- Pilots Replacement Unit RAF (June - August 1944)
- Wellington Conversion Flight RAF (April 1944 - )

== Description ==
Cranfield Aerodrome has a CAA Ordinary Licence (number P803) that allows flights for the public transport of passengers or for flying instruction as authorised by the licensee (Cranfield University) situated next to the site.

The airfield is used for a small number of university-related flights in addition to flying schools and private owners. One of the Met Office research aircraft (a BAE 146), operated under the Facility for Airborne Atmospheric Measurements, is usually based on the airfield.

Situated 3 mi (4.8 km) to the northeast of the M1 motorway and Milton Keynes, the airfield has a large catchment area.

Although the length of the runway means that Cranfield can handle commercial aircraft (up to the size of a Boeing 757), the remaining infrastructure is not suitable for scheduled passenger flights or for the handling of such aircraft.

Navigation aids include:

- NDB 'CIT' which is located 3.5 NM (6.5 km; 4.0 mi) to the north-east of the aerodrome
- ILS/DME equipment for runway 21
- VDF
- GNSS approaches to both runways

== Current operations and planned developments ==
In September 2016, the press reported that until the end of March 2017, the airport would be closed at weekends while a new air traffic control officer (ATCO) was trained; during this period, there would be days when only a single ATCO was available, and on those days, reduced opening hours would operate. Planned and permanent redistribution of aircraft traffic (PPR) was introduced. During this period, runway rejuvenation work was also carried out.

In early 2018, the press reported plans to expand the airport's business aviation activities with a new terminal, a hotel and other improvements and to rename the airport 'London' Cranfield Airport. In April 2018, it was reported that Central Bedfordshire Council had granted planning permission for a new 'Air Park', expected to be completed in 2024, however as of Q3 2026 the proposed air park has not been completed. And Cranfield Airport's website still lists the park with a completion date of 2024.

=== Planned development ===
In May 2019, Marshall Aerospace and Defence Group (now called Marshall Group), owners of Cambridge City Airport, announced that their airport would be closed to all traffic by 2030 at the latest. The group plans to redevelop their Cambridge site for housing and commercial uses. That announcement said that the Group would be deciding between three potential airfields for its continuing operations: Duxford and Wyton in Cambridgeshire, and Cranfield Airport in Bedfordshire. On 6 October 2020, Cranfield University and Marshall Group announced that they had signed an option agreement for the potential relocation of Marshall Aerospace to Cranfield Airport.

In October 2021, the group announced that it had decided in favour of the Cranfield option and that "it will leave its current base at Cambridge Airport by 2030". The group proposes to move its global group headquarters (as well as its aerospace division) to Cranfield.

In October 2025, Marshall Group announced that it was to abandon the proposed move, considering it "unaffordable" after having made a loss of $55M in 2024.
