= Joanne Clifton =

English professional dancer, presenter, actress, and singer

- Born: Joanne Kirsty Clifton; 24 October 1983 (age 43); Waltham, Lincolnshire, England
- Occupations: Dancer, presenter, actress, singer
- Years active: 1987–present
- Partner: AJ Jenks
- Relatives: Kevin Clifton (brother)

Joanne Kirsty Clifton (born 24 October 1983) is an English professional dancer, presenter, actress, and singer. She won the World Ballroom Showdance Championship in 2014, and won the European Professional Ballroom Championship and World Dancesport Games. She was a professional dancer on the BBC TV series Strictly Come Dancing from 2014 to 2016, winning the fourteenth series with Ore Oduba. She also appeared as an expert presenter on Strictly Come Dancing: It Takes Two in 2015 and 2019.

Since leaving Strictly, Clifton has starred in multiple stage productions such as the UK tours of Shrek the Musical and The Addams Family. She has been nominated for two Offies.

== Dancing career ==
Clifton started dancing ballroom and Latin as a child in her home village of Waltham, taught by her parents, former world number ones Keith and Judy Clifton. She competed nationally and internationally as a child, initially partnering her brother Kevin. Later, she chose to specialise in ballroom so as not to directly compete against her brother. She has competed in both ballroom and Latin since the age of 4. She has been a British Champion five times and Italian Champion three times, and was Professional Ballroom European Champion in 2012 and Professional World Dancesport Games Champion in 2013.

In 2000, Clifton moved to Bologna, Italy, to train with Team Diablo, the biggest dance school in Europe. She was initially partnered with Marco Cavallaro, reaching sixth in the world in amateur rankings with him. She moved to professional competition when she was chosen to partner Paolo Bosco in 2011. In 2013, they were amongst ten other professional dancing couples to be invited to perform at the Kremlin. She and her partner became champions of the World Dancesport Games in Taiwan in 2013 and won the World Professional Ballroom Showdance Championships in Merano, Italy, later that year. Clifton danced with Bosco competitively until his retirement on 15 December 2013. She retired from competitive dancing on 19 December 2013.

From April to May 2014, she joined her brother as a dancer in the Burn the Floor Dance Company, performing in the show's tour of Australia and Japan.

== Strictly Come Dancing ==
In 2014, Clifton was confirmed as a professional dancer on the BBC's Strictly Come Dancing. She was partnered with the DJ Scott Mills. They made it through to week six but were eliminated in the Halloween show. On 6 November 2014, Clifton appeared on BBC Radio 1's Innuendo Bingo. Clifton remained part of the professional line up for the following series but was not given a partner for the main show. She did, however, compete in the Children in Need special with the actor Stephen McGann and went on to win the Christmas Special with the series 9 winner Harry Judd. Clifton returned full-time to the main show for the fourteenth series and was paired with the TV presenter Ore Oduba. On 17 December, they were crowned the winners, giving her first win of the main series.

It was announced on 21 June 2017 that Clifton was to leave Strictly Come Dancing as a professional dancer after three years, due to wanting to progress in her musical theatre career.

Series	Partner	Place	Average Score
12	Scott Mills	11th	18.2
14	Ore Oduba	1st	35.7

=== Performances ===
Series 12 with Scott Mills

Week #	Dance/song	Judges' scores					Total	Result
Week #	Dance/song	Horwood	Bussell	Osmond	Goodman	Tonioli	Total	Result
1	Cha-Cha-Cha / "Rock DJ"	2	4	–	5	5	16	None
2	Tango / "Stop"	4	5	–	6	5	20	Safe
3	Samba / "Under the Sea"	2	5	7	5	6	25	Safe
4	American Smooth / "Total Eclipse of the Heart"	2	5	–	4	4	15	Safe
5	Charleston / "Flash, Bang Wallop"	4	5	–	5	5	19	Safe
6	Foxtrot / "The Addams Family Theme"	3	6	–	6	6	21	Eliminated

Series 14 with Ore Oduba

Week #	Dance/song	Judges' scores				Total	Result
Week #	Dance/song	Horwood	Bussell	Goodman	Tonioli	Total	Result
1	Tango / "Geronimo"	7	7	6	7	27	None
2	Cha-Cha-Cha / "Hot Stuff"	6	7	7	7	27	Safe
3	American Smooth / "Singin' in the Rain"	8	9	9	9	35	Safe
4	Jive / "Runaway Baby"	9	10	10	10	39	Safe
5	Waltz / "I Will Always Love You"	9	9	9	9	36	Safe
6	Charleston / "I Want Candy"	7	8	9	9	33	Safe
7	Salsa / "Turn the Beat Around"	8	8	9	9	34	Bottom two
8	Rumba / "Ordinary People"	8	9	9	9	35	Safe
9	Viennese Waltz / "That's Life"	8	10	10	10	38	Safe
10	Paso Doble / "Everybody Wants to Rule the World"; Cha-cha-cha Challenge / "I Like It Like That"	8 awarded	9; 4	9 extra	10 points	36; 40	Safe
11	Foxtrot / "Pure Imagination"	9	9	9	9	36	Bottom two
12	Quickstep / "Are You Gonna Be My Girl"; Argentine tango / "Can't Get You Out of My Head"	8; 9	10; 10	10; 10	10; 10	38; 39	Safe
13	American Smooth / "Singin' in the Rain"; Showdance / "I Got Rhythm"; Jive / "Runaway Baby"	9; 9; 10	10; 10; 10	10; 10; 10	10; 10; 10	39; 39; 40	Winners

== Stage career ==
In 2015, Clifton appeared in her first musical, the production of Face the Music at Ye Olde Rose & Crown Theatre, playing Street Walker; she was nominated for a 2016 Offie. In 2016, she appeared in Norma Jeane The Musical, playing the title character, Marilyn Monroe.

In 2017, Clifton played the title role of Millie Dillmount in the UK tour of Thoroughly Modern Millie. She also played the lead role of Alex Owens in the UK Tour of Flashdance the Musical. Between December 2017 and January 2018, Clifton played the role of Dale Tremont in the musical Top Hat, her second nomination for an Offie.

In 2019, she starred as the lead role of Janet Weiss in the UK tour of The Rocky Horror Show. In 2021, she starred as Morticia Addams in the second UK Tour of The Addams Family. In 2023, she toured with Shrek The Musical in the role of Princess Fiona. Clifton also starred as Velma von Tussle in the 2024 UK tour of Hairspray, and in the 2025–2026 UK tour of Fawlty Towers: The Play as Polly.

Year	TItle	Role	Venue	Notes	References
2015	Face the Music	Street Walker	Ye Olde Rose & Crown Theatre	Offie nomination	
2016	Norma Jean the Musical	Marilyn Monroe	Lost Theatre		
2017	Thoroughly Modern Millie	Millie Dillmount	UK tour		
2017	Flashdance the Musical	Alex Owens	UK tour		
2017–2018	Top Hat	Dale Tremont	Highgate Theatre	Offie nomination	
2019	The Rocky Horror Show	Janet Weiss	UK tour		
2021	The Addams Family	Morticia Addams	UK tour		
2023	Shrek the Musical	Princess Fiona	UK tour		
2024	Hairspray	Velma von Tussle	UK tour		
2025–2026	Fawlty Towers: The Play	Polly	UK tour		

== Personal life ==
Clifton grew up in the small North East Lincolnshire village of Waltham with her older brother, Kevin Clifton, mother, Judy Clifton and father Keith Clifton. She attended East Ravendale Primary School and Caistor Grammar School.

In 2017, Clifton appeared with her dance partner Ore Oduba in an episode of Celebrity Antiques Road Trip on BBC Two and rebroadcast in the US on PBS stations.

Since 2020, Clifton has been in a relationship with fellow stage actor AJ Jenks. On 29 September 2025, Clifton and Jenks announced their engagement, writing, "Got bored..... so we're getting married. Cheers!".

In July 2026, Clifton announced she was pregnant with her first child.
