= David Essex discography =

- Studio albums: 26
- EPs: 5
- Soundtrack albums: 5
- Live albums: 5
- Compilation albums: 19
- Singles: 68
- Video albums: 3
- Cast recording albums: 8

This is the discography of British singer-songwriter and actor David Essex.

== Albums ==
=== Studio albums ===
Year	Title	Details	Peak chart positions					Certifications
Year	Title	Details	UK	AUS	CAN	SWE	US	Certifications
1973	Rock On	Released: 2 November 1973; Label: CBS; Formats: LP, MC, 8-track	7	37	24	—	32	UK: Silver
1974	David Essex	Released: 20 September 1974; Label: CBS; Formats: LP, MC, 8-track	2	34	—	—	—	UK: Gold
1975	All the Fun of the Fair	Released: 12 September 1975; Label: CBS; Formats: LP, MC, 8-track	3	6	—	—	—	UK: Gold
1976	Out on the Street	Released: 8 October 1976; Label: CBS; Formats: LP, MC, 8-track	31	30	—	—	—	UK: Gold
1977	Gold & Ivory	Released: 16 September 1977; Label: CBS; Formats: LP, MC	29	65	—	—	—	UK: Silver
1979	Imperial Wizard	Released: 16 March 1979; Label: Mercury; Formats: LP, MC	12	—	—	—	—	
1980	Hot Love	Released: June 1980; Label: Mercury; Formats: LP, MC	75	—	—	—	—	
1981	Be-Bop the Future	Released: 11 September 1981; Label: Mercury; Formats: LP, MC	—	—	—	—	—	
1982	Stage-Struck	Released: June 1982; Label: Mercury; Formats: LP, MC	31	—	—	—	—	
1983	The Whisper	Released: December 1983; Label: Mercury; Formats: LP, MC	67	—	—	48	—	
1984	This One's for You	Released: November 1984; Label: Mercury; Formats: LP	—	—	—	—	—	
1986	Centre Stage	Released: November 1986; Label: K-tel; Formats: CD, LP, MC	82	—	—	—	—	
1989	Touching the Ghost	Released: April 1989; Label: Lamplight, Priority; Formats: CD, LP, MC	—	100	—	—	—	
1993	Cover Shot	Released: 29 March 1993; Label: PolyGram TV; Formats: CD, MC	3	—	—	—	—	UK: Gold
1994	Back to Back	Released: October 1994; Label: PolyGram TV; Formats: CD, MC	33	—	—	—	—	
1997	A Night at the Movies	Released: April 1997; Label: PolyGram TV; Formats: CD; With the Royal Philharmonic Orchestra	14	—	—	—	—	
1998	Here We Are All Together	Released: October 1998; Label: Lamplight; Formats: CD, MC	88	—	—	—	—	
1999	I Still Believe	Released: October 1999; Label: Lamplight; Formats: CD	128	—	—	—	—	
2000	Thank You	Released: September 2000; Label: Lamplight; Formats: CD	—	—	—	—	—	
2001	Wonderful	Released: 2001; Label: Lamplight; Formats: CD	—	—	—	—	—	
2002	Forever	Released: 2002; Label: Lamplight; Formats: CD	—	—	—	—	—	
2003	Sunset	Released: June 2003; Label: Lamplight; Formats: CD	—	—	—	—	—	
2004	It's Gonna Be Alright	Released: 2004; Label: Lamplight; Formats: CD	—	—	—	—	—	
2006	Beautiful Day	Released: 28 September 2006; Label: Joseph Webster Ltd; Formats: CD	—	—	—	—	—	
2007	Happy Ever After	Released: 2007; Label: Joseph Webster Ltd; Formats: CD	—	—	—	—	—	
2013	Reflections	Released: 28 October 2013; Label: Right Track; Formats: CD, digital download	89	—	—	—	—	
"—" denotes releases that did not chart or were not released in that territory.

=== Live albums ===
Year	Title	Details	Peak chart positions			Certifications
Year	Title	Details	UK	AUS	SWE	Certifications
1976	In Scandinavia	Released: March 1976; Label: CBS; Formats: LP; Released in the Netherlands as In Europe; Europe-only release	—	—	31	
1976	On Tour	Released: 7 May 1976; Label: CBS; Formats: 2xLP, MC, 8-track	51	11	—	UK: Silver
1984	Live at the Royal Albert Hall	Released: December 1984; Label: PolyGram TV; Formats: MC; Only released as a package with the concert video release	—	—	—	
2002	Theatre of Dreams	Released: 14 February 2002; Label: Lamplight; Formats: CD	—	—	—	
2013	The Secret Tour – Live	Released: 3 November 2013; Label: Wienerworld; Formats: CD, digital download	—	—	—	
"—" denotes releases that did not chart or were not released in that territory.

=== Soundtrack albums ===
Year	Title	Details	Peak chart positions	
Year	Title	Details	UK	AUS
1973	That'll Be the Day	Released: May 1973; Label: Ronco; Formats: 2xLP, 2xMC, 2x8-track; Soundtrack to the film of the same name; Essex sings "Rock On"	1	9
1974	Stardust	Released: October 1974; Label: Ronco; Formats: 2xLP, MC, 2x8-track; Soundtrack to the film of the same name; Essex sings "Stardust"	—	7
1976	All This and World War II	Released: 5 November 1976; Label: Riva, 20th Century; Formats: 2xLP, 2xMC, 8-track; Soundtrack to the film of the same name; Essex sings a cover of "Yesterday"	23	14
1980	Silver Dream Racer	Released: April 1980; Label: Mercury; Formats: LP; Soundtrack to the film of the same name	—	—
2013	Traveller	Released: 2 December 2013; Label: Right Track; Formats: CD, digital download; Soundtrack to the film of the same name	—	—
"—" denotes releases that did not chart.

=== Cast recording albums ===
Year	Title	Details	Peak chart positions	
Year	Title	Details	UK	AUS
1972	Godspell	Released: 7 February 1972; Label: Bell; Formats: LP; Original London cast recording of the musical of the same name, with Essex singing several songs	11	—
1978	Evita	Released: 27 October 1978; Label: MCA; Formats: LP, MC; Original London cast recording of the musical of the same name, with Essex singing several songs	24	81
1978	Jeff Wayne's Musical Version of The War of the Worlds	Released: 9 June 1978; Label: CBS; Formats: 2xLP, 2xMC, 2x8-track; Studio cast recording	5	1
1979	Alpha Omega: A Musical Revelation	Released: 1 September 1979; Label: United Artists; Formats: 2xLP; Studio cast recording; Essex sings "World" and "I Who Am I"	—	—
1983	Mutiny!	Released: October 1983; Label: Mercury; Formats: LP, MC; Studio cast recording, originally recorded and released as a concept album, based on the novel Mutiny on the Bounty.	39	—
1985	Mutiny!	Released: October 1985; Label: Telstar; Formats: LP, MC; Original London cast recording of the musical of the same name, based on the 1983 concept album	—	—
1995	Beauty & the Beast	Released: 1995; Label: MBO; Formats: 2xCD; Studio cast recording of a ballet score written by Essex for the Russian All-Stars ice skating ensemble	—	—
2010	All the Fun of the Fair	Released: 2010; Label: ATFOTF; Formats: CD; Original London cast recording of the musical of the same name	—	—
"—" denotes releases that did not chart or were not released in that territory.

=== Compilation albums ===
Year	Title	Details	Peak chart positions	Certifications
Year	Title	Details	UK	Certifications
1978	The David Essex Album	Released: 13 October 1978; Label: CBS; Formats: LP, MC	29	UK: Silver
1979	Hold Me Close	Released: October 1979; Label: CBS; Formats: LP	—	
1980	The David Essex Collection	Released: August 1980; Label: Hallmark; Formats: 2xLP, 2xMC	—	
1982	The Very Best of David Essex	Released: November 1982; Label: TV; Formats: LP, MC	37	
1983	David Essex	Released: June 1983; Label: Mercury; Formats: LP, MC; US-only release	—	
1990	The Collection	Released: June 1990; Label: Castle Communications; Formats: CD, 2xLP	—	
1991	His Greatest Hits	Released: 7 October 1991; Label: PolyGram TV/Mercury; Formats: CD, LP, MC	13	UK: Gold
1992	Best Of	Released: 21 April 1992; Label: Columbia; Formats: CD	—	
1993	You're in My Heart	Released: 1993; Label: Spectrum Music; Formats: CD, MC	—	
1995	The Collection	Released: 1995; Label: Spectrum Music; Formats: CD	—	
1995	Living in England	Released: August 1995; Label: Cleveland; Formats: CD, MC; US-only release	—	
1995	Missing You – 16 Classic Love Songs	Released: 27 November 1995; Label: PolyGram TV; Formats: CD, MC	26	UK: Silver
1996	The Best of David Essex	Released: 1996; Label: Columbia; Formats: CD	—	UK: Silver
1998	The Very Best of David Essex	Released: June 1998; Label: PolyGram TV; Formats: 2xCD, 2xMC	31	
2005	The Complete Collection	Released: 5 April 2005; Label: Spectrum Music; Formats: 2xCD	—	
2006	Greatest Hits	Released: 6 March 2006; Label: Sony BMG/Columbia/Universal Music TV; Formats: CD	7	UK: Gold
2007	The Silver Collection	Released: November 2007; Label: Spectrum Music; Formats: CD	—	
2008	All the Fun of the Fair – Greatest Hits	Released: September 2008; Label: Universal Music; Formats: CD; Greatest hits concept album for the 2010 musical	23	
2009	The Collection	Released: 4 September 2009; Label: Sony Music; Formats: CD, digital download	—	
"—" denotes releases that did not chart or were not released in that territory.

=== Video albums ===
Year	Title	Details
1984	Live at the Royal Albert Hall	Released: December 1984; Label: PolyGram Video; Formats: VHS, Betamax
1991	His Greatest Hits Live	Released: November 1991; Label: PolyGram Video; Formats: VHS
2013	The Secret Tour Live	Released: November 2013; Label: Wienerworld; Formats: DVD

== EPs ==
Year	Title	Details
1983	David Essex	Released: December 1983; Label: Scoop 33; Formats: 7", MC; Compilation of Essex's hits
1991	The Christmas EP	Released: December 1991; Label: Mercury; Formats: 7", CD
1996	The Adventures of Robinson Crusoe	Released: 1996; Label: Lamplight; Formats: CD
2009	Unplugged	Released: 28 September 2009; Label: Joseph Webster Ltd; Formats: CD, digital download
2015	Can't Nobody Love You EP	Released: 17 November 2015; Label: Virgin EMI; Formats: digital download

== Singles ==
Year	Single	Peak chart positions										Album
Year	Single	UK	AUS	BE (FLA)	BE (WA)	CAN	GER	IRE	NL	SA	US	Album
1965	"And the Tears Came Tumbling Down"	—	—	—	—	—	—	—	—	—	—	Non-album singles
1965	"Can't Nobody Love You"	—	—	—	—	—	—	—	—	—	—	Non-album singles
1966	"This Little Girl of Mine"	—	—	—	—	—	—	—	—	—	—	Non-album singles
1966	"Thigh High"	—	—	—	—	—	—	—	—	—	—	Non-album singles
1967	"She's Leaving Home" (US-only release)	—	—	—	—	—	—	—	—	—	—	Non-album singles
1968	"Love Story"	—	—	—	—	—	—	—	—	—	—	Non-album singles
1968	"Just for Tonight"	—	—	—	—	—	—	—	—	—	—	Non-album singles
1969	"That Takes Me Back"	—	—	—	—	—	—	—	—	—	—	Non-album singles
1969	"The Day the Earth Stood Still"	—	—	—	—	—	—	—	—	—	—	Non-album singles
1970	"Time of Our Life" (with Rozaa Wortham)	—	—	—	—	—	—	—	—	—	—	Non-album singles
1971	"The Spark That Lights the Flame" (with Rozaa Wortham)	—	—	—	—	—	—	—	—	—	—	Non-album singles
1973	"Rock On"	3	8	—	—	1	44	15	—	—	5	That'll Be the Day / Rock On
1973	"Lamplight"	7	53	—	—	55	—	20	—	—	71	Rock On
1974	"America"	32	—	—	20	—	—	—	—	—	101	David Essex
1974	"Gonna Make You a Star"	1	4	16	44	—	43	1	14	10	105	David Essex
1974	"Stardust"	7	—	—	—	—	—	3	—	—	—	Stardust (Note: The single version of "Stardust" was the version from the film of the same name. An alternative version was included on David Essex.)
1975	"Good Ol' Rock & Roll" (France-only release)	—	—	—	—	—	—	—	—	—	—	David Essex
1975	"I Know" (Netherlands-only release)	—	—	—	—	—	—	—	—	—	—	David Essex
1975	"Rolling Stone"	5	19	—	—	—	—	—	—	—	—	All the Fun of the Fair
1975	"Hold Me Close"	1	2	—	—	—	—	1	—	—	—	All the Fun of the Fair
1975	"If I Could"	13	83	—	—	—	—	—	—	—	—	All the Fun of the Fair
1976	"City Lights"	24	4	—	—	—	—	—	—	—	—	Out on the Street
1976	"Coming Home"	24	30	—	—	—	—	—	—	—	—	Out on the Street
1976	"Ooh Love"	—	—	—	—	—	—	—	—	—	—	Out on the Street
1977	"Cool Out Tonight"	23	57	—	—	—	—	—	—	—	—	Gold & Ivory
1978	"Stay with Me Baby"	45	—	—	—	—	—	—	—	—	—	Non-album single
1978	"Oh What a Circus"	3	72	26	—	—	—	8	20	—	—	Imperial Wizard (Note: "Oh What a Circus" was released as a single from the musical Evita. However, it is not the version included on the Evita cast recording album, as the single was a re-recording by Essex which was then included on his album Imperial Wizard.)
1978	"Brave New World"	55	—	—	—	—	—	—	—	—	—	Jeff Wayne's Musical Version of the War of the Worlds
1978	"Goodbye First Love"	—	—	—	—	—	—	—	—	—	—	Imperial Wizard
1979	"Imperial Wizard"	32	—	—	—	—	—	—	—	—	—	Imperial Wizard
1979	"20 Flights Up"	—	—	—	—	—	—	—	—	—	—	Imperial Wizard
1979	"World"	—	—	—	—	—	—	—	—	—	—	Alpha Omega: A Musical Revelation
1980	"Silver Dream Machine"	4	—	—	—	—	—	3	—	—	—	Silver Dream Racer
1980	"Hot Love"	57	74	—	—	—	—	—	—	—	—	Hot Love
1980	"The Race"	—	—	—	—	—	—	—	—	—	—	Silver Dream Racer
1980	"On My Bike"	—	—	—	—	—	—	—	—	—	—	Hot Love
1980	"Heart on My Sleeve"	—	—	—	—	—	—	—	—	—	—	Hot Love
1981	"Be-Bop-a-Lula"	—	—	—	—	—	—	—	—	—	—	Be-Bop the Future
1981	"Sunshine Girl"	—	—	—	—	—	—	—	—	—	—	Be-Bop the Future
1981	"The Magician"	—	—	—	—	—	—	—	—	—	—	Be-Bop the Future
1982	"Sweethearts"	—	—	—	—	—	—	—	—	—	—	Stage-Struck
1982	"Me and My Girl (Night-Clubbing)"	13	—	—	—	—	—	9	—	—	—	Stage-Struck
1982	"No Substitutes"	—	—	—	—	—	—	—	—	—	—	Stage-Struck
1982	"A Winter's Tale"	2	33	—	—	—	—	3	—	4	—	The Whisper
1983	"The Smile"	52	—	—	—	—	—	—	—	—	—	Non-album single
1983	"Tahiti"	8	—	—	—	—	—	5	47	—	—	Mutiny! (1983)
1983	"You're in My Heart"	59	—	—	—	—	—	—	—	11	—	The Whisper
1984	"Fishing for the Moon"	76	—	—	—	—	—	—	—	—	—	The Whisper
1984	"Welcome"	80	—	—	—	—	—	—	—	—	—	This One's for You
1985	"Falling Angels Riding"	29	—	—	—	—	—	—	—	—	—	This One's for You
1985	"Friends"	91	—	—	—	—	—	—	—	—	—	This One's for You
1985	"Freedom" (with Frank Finlay and the Cast of Mutiny!)	—	—	—	—	—	—	—	—	—	—	Mutiny! (1985)
1986	"Back in England for Christmas"	—	—	—	—	—	—	—	—	—	—	Non-album single
1987	"Myfanwy"	41	40	—	—	—	—	—	—	—	—	Touchin' the Ghost (Note: "Myfanwy" was first released on the Australasian version of Touchin' the Ghost. However, the song comes from the 1990 various artists album Poetry in Motion, based on the works on John Betjeman.)
1988	"Look at the Sun Shining"	—	—	—	—	—	—	—	—	—	—	Touching the Ghost
1988	"The River"	97	—	—	—	—	—	—	—	—	—	Touching the Ghost
1989	"Rock On" (re-recording; remixed by Shep Pettibone)	93	—	—	—	—	—	—	—	—	—	Touching the Ghost
1989	"The Sun Ain't Gonna Shine (Anymore)"	90	—	—	—	—	—	—	—	—	—	Touching the Ghost
1989	"Missing You (Magic)"	—	—	—	—	—	—	—	—	—	—	Touching the Ghost
1990	"A Shoulder to Cry On"	—	—	—	—	—	—	—	—	—	—	Non-album single
1991	"Africa – You Shine" (with Shikisha featuring Abdul Tee-Jay)	100	—	—	—	—	—	—	—	—	—	Under Different Skies (Note: "Africa – You Shine" was first released on the compilation album His Greatest Hits, but was released as a single from Essex's VSO various artists album Under Different Skies (released 4 November 1991).)
1992	"A Song for Old Lovers"	107	—	—	—	—	—	—	—	—	—	Non-album single
1993	"Everlasting Love"	80	—	—	—	—	—	—	—	—	—	Cover Shot
1994	"True Love Ways" (with Catherine Zeta-Jones)	38	—	—	—	—	—	—	—	—	—	Back to Back
1995	"Bella Bella"	87	—	—	—	—	—	—	—	—	—	Beauty & the Beast
1998	"Oh Suburbia"	180	—	—	—	—	—	—	—	—	—	Here We Are All Together
2001	"Dance with Me"	—	—	—	—	—	—	—	—	—	—	Wonderful
2013	"Lamplight" (re-recording)	—	—	—	—	—	—	—	—	—	—	Reflections
"—" denotes releases that did not chart or were not released in that territory.
