= Greatest Hits (David Essex album) =

Greatest hits album by David Essex
- Released: 6 March 2006
- Genre: Pop/Rock
- Label: Sony

Professional ratings
Review scores
Source	Rating
Allmusic	link

Greatest Hits is a greatest hits album released by David Essex on 6 March 2006. The album contains 20 of his biggest hits to date.

== Track listing ==
All songs written by David Essex, except where specified.

1. "Rock On"
2. "Gonna Make You a Star"
3. "Lamplight"
4. "Hold Me Close"
5. "Stardust"
6. "America"
7. "Rolling Stone"
8. "If I Could"
9. "City Lights"
10. "Oh What a Circus" (Andrew Lloyd Webber, Tim Rice)
11. "Silver Dream Machine"
12. "Heart on My Sleeve" (Stephen Ernest Colyer, David Essex)
13. "Me and My Girl (Night-Clubbing)"
14. "Falling Angels Riding"
15. "Missing You (Magic)" (Carlotta Christy)
16. "Picture This Sky"
17. "It's Gonna Be Alright"
18. "You're in My Heart"
19. "Tahiti" (Richard Crane, David Essex)
20. "A Winter's Tale" (Mike Batt, Tim Rice)

== Charts ==
=== Weekly charts ===
Chart (2006)	Peak position
Scottish Albums (OCC)	18
UK Albums (OCC)	7

=== Year-end charts ===
Chart (2006)	Position
UK Albums (OCC)	165
