= Whiteburn =

Background information
- Years active: 2000-present

Whiteburn are an audio production team based in South London formed by Dave Needham and Dan Cook.

== History ==
They first met in 1992 when Dave became lead Guitarist in the band “Psycho Circus” of which Dan was the drummer. Despite enjoying all the fun of being part of the band and some local celebrity status, a weekend recording at Kenney Jones’s residential studio sparked a newfound interest in the recording process. So much so that the band decided to spend the night and slept under the mixing desk.

This interest in recording led the pair to later study at The Gateway School of Recording and both graduated from the University with a Diploma in Sound Engineering.

After graduating they formed the production company Whiteburn. Recognition soon followed and led to working with the legendary singer/songwriter David Essex who acknowledged their young talent and in 2000 asked them to produce his album “Wonderful”.

Since then they have produced over 70 tracks for David Essex spanning 8 albums in many different styles. The albums have all been very well received and numerous tracks made their way onto his gold selling Greatest Hits Album released in 2006 and his latest album ‘All the Fun of the Fair’ which reached number 13 in the album charts in the summer of 2008. Their work is also heavily featured in the recent sell out musical “All the Fun of the Fair” which will be going to the Garrick theatre in the West End in the spring of 2010.

Whiteburn's eclectic sound has also led them to work with the platinum selling contemporary classical artist, Maksim Mrvica. After remixing 2 tracks of extra content for the special release of his album "The Piano Player”, Whiteburn were asked to work with Maksim again to produce the official classical single for the Athens Olympics "Olympic Dream" which was also released on "Harmony" (The Official Athens 2004 Olympic Games Classical Album) and Maksim's "Variations Part I&II" by EMI Classics.

They have recently completed a project for West Ham United Football Club, where they were asked to produce an up-to-date version of their club song “I'm Forever Blowing Bubbles”. West Ham are soon to release this as their new official song.

== Discography ==
- Wonderful - 2001 (David Essex)
- Theatre Of Dreams - 2001 (David Essex)
- Forever - 2002 (David Essex)
- Sunset - 2003 (David Essex)
- The Piano Player - 2003 (Maksim Mrvica)
- Variations Part I&II - 2004 (Maksim Mrvica)
- It's Gonna Be Alright - 2004 (David Essex)
- Harmony - 2004 (The Official Athens 2004 Olympic Games Classical Album)
- Greatest Hits - 2006 (David Essex)
- Beautiful Day - 2006 (David Essex)
- Happy Ever After - 2007 (David Essex)
- All The Fun Of The Fair - Greatest Hits - 2008 (David Essex)
- Unplugged EP - 2009 (David Essex)
