= All the Fun of the Fair =

- Promotional Poster
- Music: Various Artists
- Lyrics: Various Artists
- Book: Jon Conway
- Basis: David Essex jukebox musical
- Productions: 2008 UK Tour; 2010 West End

All the Fun of the Fair is a 2008 jukebox musical with a book by Jon Conway, based on the songs of David Essex. The title of the musical is taken from David Essex's 1975 album All the Fun of the Fair.

The show had an initial provincial run in the UK in 2008. The show transferred to the Garrick Theatre in the West End in April 2010 for a limited season which concluded in September 2010. It toured again in late 2011.

== Synopsis ==
The show follows Levi Lee, a recently widowed father with a rebellious teenage son, Jack. Levi owns a fairground, and struggles to make ends meet. One of the fairground's residents, a Romani fortune teller, named Rosa, is in love with Levi and tells him there is danger and mysticism in his future. Jack, meanwhile, falls in love with Alice, the daughter of Harvey, an unscrupulous businessman. Harvey sends a group of thugs to run the fair out of town.

== Productions ==
=== 2008 Tour ===
The 2008 tour, which ran from September 2008 until May 2009, visited Cardiff, Nottingham, Wimbledon, Milton Keynes, Plymouth, Norwich, Belfast, Birmingham, Hull, Sunderland, Southampton, Liverpool, High Wycombe, Swansea, Northampton, Llandudno and Bristol.

=== 2011 UK national tour ===
The show is directed by Nikolai Foster, set and costumes by Ian Westbrook, lighting by Ben Cracknell, sound by Steve Jonas, musical staging/assistant director Drew McOnie, musical arranger/studio production Ian Wherry, musical supervisor Olly Ashmore, and magical creative consultants The Twins. The cast consisted of David Essex (Levi), Louise English (Rosa), David Burrows (Harvey), Rob Compton (Jack), Tim Newman (Jonny), Susan Hallam Wright (Mary), Tanya Robb (Alice), Barry Bloxham (Druid), Susan Hall (Sally), James Hill (Spiv), Gareth Leighton (Chris), Louise Lenihan (Rita), Luke Baker (Chris), and Edie Campbell (Laura).

== Musical numbers ==
- A Winter's Tale - Rosa
- All the Fun of the Fair - Levi and Company
- He Noticed Me - Alice and Mary
- Here We Are All Together - Company
- Hold Me Close - Jack and Company
- Pretty Thing - Jack and Alice
- Rock On - Levi and Harvey
- Me And My Girl (Nightclubbing) - Jack, Jonny and Company
- Street Fight - Harvey and Druid
- Gonna Make You a Star - Company
- Father And Son - Levi and Jack
- You're In My Heart - Levi, Rosa, Jack, Alice and Mary
- Lamplight - Jack
- Stay Young And Free - Harvey and Alice
- She's Leaving - Jonny, Levi, Harvey and Company
- If I Could - Jack and Alice
- Dangerous - Levi, Mary and Company
- Silver Dream Machine - Jack, Jonny and Levi
- It's Gonna Be Alright - Levi
- Here We Are All Together (Reprise) - Levi and Company

== Reception ==
The show received criticism for its book, as critics felt the plot was convoluted in order to shoehorn in Essex's songs.
