= David Essex (album) =

Studio album by David Essex
- Released: September 1974
- Genre: Glam rock; pop; rock
- Label: CBS
- Producer: Jeff Wayne

David Essex chronology
Rock On (1973)	David Essex (1974)	All the Fun of the Fair (1975)

David Essex is the second studio album by English singer David Essex. It was released at the end of September 1974 and was produced, arranged and conducted by Jeff Wayne. It peaked at number two on the UK Albums Chart and was the Christmas number two album that year.

== Track listing ==
All tracks written by David Essex.

1. "Gonna Make You a Star" - 3:29
2. "Window" - 4:03
3. "I Know" - 3:34
4. "There's Something About You Baby" - 3:48
5. "Good Ol' Rock & Roll" - 4:41
6. "America" - 3:21
7. "Dance Little Girl" - 3:03
8. "Ooh Darling" - 2:56
9. "Miss Sweetness" - 4:37
10. "Stardust" - 4:05

== Background to Album Release and Album Production ==
The album was released in late Autumn of 1974 following Essex's considerable success in the lead role in two films That'll Be the Day (1973) and its sequel Stardust (1974), plus his first recording successes with Rock On and the single "Lamplight". The lead track from the album was released as a single: "Gonna Make You a Star" on 27 September 1974 and topped the UK charts by 10 November 1974, remaining at the top for 3 weeks. This allowed for the album to achieve outstanding sales heading into Christmas 1974. By Christmas, CBS had released a third single, "Stardust" which became UK top 5 by New Year 1975. The first single to be released officially from the album was 'America' but this did not chart well.

The cassette release of the album included an instrumental rendition of "Gonna Make You a Star" which commenced as 'Stardust' faded on Side Two, presumably added to the cassette version of the album with the length of tape on side two being shorter than on side one. This instrumental was largely the production work of Jeff Wayne, who would continue to work with Essex notably on the musical War of the Worlds.

The album version of "Stardust" differed to the version used for the closing credits of the film of the same name. The album version is slower and the vocal is slightly more forward in the mix at the start. Also the heartbeat at the beginning of the album version was not used in the end-credits to the film. The album version is considered to be a second alternative take of the song with more overdubbing and studio production influence from Jeff Wayne; which left the film version faster as originally recorded and much grittier.

All three singles contained three additional album tracks as B-sides: "America" b/w "Dance Little Girl"; "Gonna Make You a Star" b/w "Window"; "Stardust" b/w "Miss Sweetness".

On the album the lead track "Gonna Make You a Star" was segued into the second track "Window".

In October 1975, Essex released "Hold Me Close" as a single from his next studio album All The Fun of the Fair. On the B-side of the single was a live version of "Good Ol' Rock and Roll".

== Personnel ==
- David Essex: Vocals, percussion (courtesy of his mom)
- Chris Spedding (Courtesy of Chrysalis), Mark Griffiths: Guitars
- Peter Wood (Courtesy of Island): Keyboards
- Ken Freeman, Jeff Wayne: Synthesizers
- Bass Guitar - Mike Thorn, Herbie Flowers
- Drums - Barry de Souza
- Percussion - Ray Cooper
- Woodwinds - The English Saxophone Consort (Courtesy of Jeff Wayne Music), Alan Wakeman

=== Backing vocals ===
- Julie Covington
- Doreen & Irene Chanter
- Paul Vigrass & Gary Osborne
- Billy Lowrie (Courtesy of RCA)
- The Persuasions (Courtesy of A&M)
- Nathan Dambuza

== Production ==
- Producer - Jeff Wayne
- Recorded at Advision Studios by Gary Martin.
- Assistant Engineer - Rockette
- Album Photography - Colin Davey & Brian Aris

== Charts ==
Chart (1974)	Peak position
Australian Albums (Kent Music Report)	34
UK Albums (OCC)	2

== Certifications ==
Region	Certification	Certified units/sales
United Kingdom (BPI)	Gold	100,000^{^}
^{^} Shipments figures based on certification alone.
