= Louise English =

English actress

- Born: 27 April 1962 (age 63); Bow, London, England
- Education: Stella Mann School of Dancing, Anna Scher Theatre School
- Occupation(s): Actress, singer, dancer, model
- Years active: 1970–present
- Mother: Elizabeth (Liz) English
- Website: https://www.louiseenglishfancentre.com/

Louise English (born 27 April 1962) is a British actress. She was a regular performer on The Benny Hill Show from 1978 to 1986, as an actress and in dance group Hill's Angels (the show ran from 1969 to 1989) and has performed in West End plays and nationally touring musical-theatre productions.

== Early life and education ==
English's mother, Elizabeth (Liz) English, was an actress, singer, and dancer who appeared in Evening Stars, a review that toured with Benny Hill during his early showbusiness career. She attended ballet school. While at the ballet school, she was cast in Bugsy Malone as the ballerina. She was selected as the 1977 Butlin's Holiday Princess.

== Television ==
English was chosen by Benny Hill to be one of the original members of Hill's Angels on The Benny Hill Show and earned a role as a featured performer. She spent eight years on The Benny Hill Show, dancing with Hill's Angels and occasionally performing supporting roles in sketches with the show's titular writer and host. She also was the featured performer in song-and-dance numbers, performing renditions of classic songs including "La Vie en Rose", "Pour Un Flirt Avec Toi", "Paradise", and "Milord".

English appeared on other television shows, including playing the role of Lucia Morella in five episodes of the popular BBC series Brush Strokes and filming the pilot for the BBC game show Full Swing. English was also a featured guest on the Central TV entertainment specials Elkie and Our Gang with Elkie Brooks and Gemma Craven, Saturday Royal, and Entertainment Express (all choreographed by Nigel Lythgoe), Dream Alley, and Starburst. Additional TV credits include Fresh Fields, Lytton’s Diary, Full House, Chance in a Million, Give Us a Clue, and Don’t Rock the Boat (all for Thames TV), and guest appearances on the Mike Yarwood Show. She has also appeared in EastEnders.

== Theatre, feature films, musicals and pantomimes ==
English starred in cabaret in England, the Channel Islands, and Bangkok, performed Shakespeare, and appeared in minor parts in feature films, including The Wicked Lady (1983) with Faye Dunaway, Denholm Elliott, and John Gielgud, and House of the Long Shadows (1983) with Vincent Price, Christopher Lee, John Carradine, and Peter Cushing.

She has starred as leading lady in many comedies and dramas, including Absent Friends, Suddenly at Home, Tommy Boy, Don't Dress For Dinner, Bedside Manners, and Shadow of Doubt.

English is a veteran of several national tours, including nine months as the lead in Mike Harding's comedy Fur Coat and No Knickers, Ted Willis' play Tommy Boy, Tom Lehrer's Tom Foolery, Oscar Wilde's An Ideal Husband, and Russ Abbot's Madhouse. She travelled to Stockholm to perform a role in Neil Simon's I Ought To Be In Pictures.

She played the lead role of Louise in Gypsy: A Musical Fable at the Crucible Theatre, played Bella Spellgrove in a national tour and on the cast-recorded CD of Sherlock Holmes – The Musical, and was the female vocal lead in Maxwell – The Musical and Italian Idol – The Musical.

She also appeared in the national tour of My Dearest Ivor, an original musical that honoured Ivor Novello. In this show, she played eight roles and sang ten songs. English performed dramatic roles as Bella Manningham in the Victorian thriller Gaslight, as Sybil Chase in Private Lives, and as Liz in Shadow of Doubt.

She has played the principal girl or boy in over ten pantomimes throughout the UK, including Babes in the Wood, Aladdin, Jack and the Beanstalk, Dick Whittington, Mother Goose, The Bells of Notre Dame, and a record-breaking run of Snow White.

== 2000 onwards ==
| Year | Louise English – Performances |
|---|---|
| 2000 | Appeared as Lady Chiltern in the UK tour of An Ideal Husband and as the lead in the Christmas pantomime Jack and the Beanstalk. |
| 2001 | Portrayed Grace Farrell in Annie – The Musical, with Vicki Michelle. She reprised her role as Sally Smith in the Christmas production of Me and My Girl at the Alexandra Theatre, Birmingham. |
| 2002 | Played Grace Farrell in the Annie The Musical tour with Su Pollard. Starred as the fairy tale princess Snow White during the 2002–2003 Christmas pantomime season. |
| 2003 | Played Anne Norbury in William Fairchild's The Sound of Murder; Molly Forsyth in William Douglas-Home's comedy The Secretary Bird; and Vivien Norwood in Francis Durbridge's thriller, House Guest, all at the Theatre Royal Windsor. Later she played Sally in Bedside Manners with television favourite John Inman at the Bournemouth Pier Theatre. Louise reprised her role as Grace Farrell during a UK and Ireland tour of Annie – The Musical. |
| 2004 | Traveled to Singapore to play Teresa Phillips in How the Other Half Loves, a farce by Alan Ayckbourn. She then reprised her role as Grace Farrell in Annie The Musical in Kuala Lumpur and in a UK tour. |
| 2005 | Returned to Kuala Lumpur to play Nancy in Oliver! The Musical at the Genting International Showroom. She reprised her signature role as Grace Farrell in Annie The Musical 2005, touring the UK and Ireland, and then played the roles of Mrs Darling and the Marilyn Monroe-esque Magical Mermaid in the Christmas pantomime Peter Pan at the Manchester Opera House. |
| 2006 | Reprised her signature role as Grace Farrell in a UK tour of Annie The Musical and played Mrs Darling and The Mermaid in Peter Pan at the Wycombe Swan Theatre. |
| 2007 | Played The Forest Fairy in Snow White at the Hawth Theatre, Crawley. |
| 2008 | Played sophisticated hat shop owner Irene Molloy in an eight-month UK national tour of Hello, Dolly!. |
| 2009 | Played Rosa in the new musical All the Fun of the Fair, with David Essex that toured the UK in May and was featured on the newly released All the Fun of the Fair compact disc performing her solo from the show, A Winter's Tale. English also appeared at the new Marlowe Theatre Arena in Canterbury, playing the role of Mrs Darling in Peter Pan. |
| 2018 | Key Advice television advert – featured part. |
