= Tolga Kashif =

British born musical conductor, composer, orchestrator, producer and arranger

Tolga Kashif (Tolga Kaşif) (born 1962) is a British born musical conductor, composer, orchestrator, producer and arranger of Turkish Cypriot descent.

== Early life ==
Turkish-Cypriot Tolga Kashif was born in London. Before going on to further education, Kashif went to Churchfields Junior School and Forest School. His compositional and conducting studies at the Royal College of Music led him subsequently to Bristol University with Derek Bourgeois. He had his professional début with the London Royal Philharmonic Orchestra, resulting in further collaborations with the City of London Sinfonia, Royal Liverpool Philharmonic, Northern Sinfonia and the Wren Orchestra. He has been the music director of the London Amadeus Choir. In 1992 he became the associate conductor of the National Symphony Orchestra of London.

Kashif has conducted the Polish National Symphony and the St Petersburg Philharmonic Orchestra. In 1989, he worked with the London Royal Philharmonic Orchestra abroad in a series of concerts held as part of the Istanbul International Festival of the same year. In 1991 he was assigned the position of permanent guest conductor of the Presidential Symphony Orchestra.

== The Music Sculptors ==
As of 1989, Kashif's role as a creative partner in "The Music Sculptors" – a company specialising in sound-to-picture – saw him combining his roles as composer, conductor and producer. He worked with the BBC Symphony, BBC Scottish Symphony and the English Chamber Orchestra. Through this programme, he co-wrote the soundtrack for Silver Fox Films' children's animation First Snow of Winter (1999), which won a British Academy of Film and Television Arts Award, a Royal Television Award and a Prix Jeunesse. Following the film's success, Kashif co-wrote the music to The Second Star to the Left (2001). He also co-wrote the soundtrack for Where the Heart Is, Q.E.D. (BBC TV series) and the BBC's documentary series concerning the Gulf War: Fighting the War. Kashif musically directed the BBC Children in Need's single, "Perfect Day" (1997).

== Musical collaborations ==
Kashif's first major work was for Mediaset, which he composed the new idents for Rete 4 launched on 20 September 1999, created by British design agency E&P Associates.

Kashif co-wrote the original score for the feature film, The Criminal (2000), with Mark Sayer-Wade, his partner at The Music Sculptors. He conducted the world premiere of his composition, The Garden of the Prophet (2000) with the English Chamber Orchestra at the Barbican Arts Centre. In 2004 he both produced and arranged Vanessa-Mae's Choreography for Sony Classical Records and Maksim Mrvica's Variations Part I&II for EMI. In the same year, he conducted the ECO in Roland Chadwick's The Revealing. Kashif worked with the London Metropolitan Orchestra when recording 3 tracks for Amy Nuttall in her crossover album for EMI Classics: Best Days (2005). He used 33 strings, flutes, oboes, horns, trumpets and trombones for the songs, and they were recorded by engineer Geoff Foster at AIR Lyndhurst Hall.

== National Foundation for Youth Music ==
In March 2002, Kashif received a commission from the NFYM to write a song for youth: Drop In the Ocean, with additional lyrics by Richard Stilgoe. The composer went on record explaining his inspiration behind the music.

"The well known phrase 'a drop in the ocean' to me represents a universal choice for humanity; either to view ourselves as separate and insignificant or each of us as a unique part of the whole, the 'ocean' of consciousness. I think it is important for children to understand that however small we may feel at times, we all have a crucial part to play both now and in the future. May we never lose the child in us."

The song was recorded by the New London Children's Choir at Abbey Road Studios. It was premiered at the Royal Festival Hall, and received a further performance at the Commonwealth Day Observance at Westminster Abbey.

== Future Talent ==
Kashif is a patron of the registered charity, Future Talent. This organisation strives for the high prioritisation of music in Primary schools across the UK.

== Queen Symphony ==
=== History ===
Kashif spent two years composing the Queen Symphony. He conducted the Royal Philharmonic Orchestra in its debut on Wednesday 6 November 2002. It was performed in the Royal Festival Hall and broadcast on ABC TV to a wide European audience. After being recorded at Abbey Road Studios in 2002, Queen Symphony was nominated Album of the Year in the 2003 Classical Brit Awards.

In 2003, Kashif directed the Northern Sinfonia in UK tours with Lesley Garrett. He conducted the Turkish première of Queen Symphony at the International Izmir Festival. He also directed the piece in Australia in two sold-out performances at the Sydney Opera House with the Sydney Symphony Orchestra. These were broadcast on ABC Classic FM. He also conducted a UK tour in 2007.

=== Work ===
Queen Symphony has six movements. It is based on around a dozen melodies from the rock band Queen. These include "Bohemian Rhapsody", "We Will Rock You", "We Are the Champions" and "Who Wants to Live Forever", the latter including a performance by Nicola Loud. The piece has been performed regularly and in 2004 received US and Dutch premières. The tonal language of the symphony is diverse and draws on much of the Western classical tradition, with Kashif himself listing influences as diverse as medieval music, Romantic music and opera. There are concertante passages for piano in the second movement, and for violin and cello in the third.

==== Movements ====
1. Adagio misterioso - Allegro con brio - Maestoso - Misterioso - Allegro (Radio Gaga, The Show Must Go On, One Vision, I Was Born To Love You)
2. Allegretto - Allegro scherzando - Tranquillo (Love Of My Life, Another One Bites The Dust, Killer Queen)
3. Adagio (Who Wants To Live Forever, Save Me)
4. Allegro vivo - Moderato cantabile - Cadenza - A tempo primo (Bicycle Race, Save Me)
5. Andante doloroso - Allegretto - Alla marcia - Moderato risoluto - Pastorale - Maestoso (Bohemian Rhapsody, We Will Rock You, We Are The Champions, Who Wants To Live Forever)
6. Andante sostenuto (We Are The Champions, Bohemian Rhapsody, Who Wants To Live Forever)

== The Genesis Suite ==
On 11 October 2010, at the Barbican in London, Kashif conducted the London Symphony Orchestra in the world premiere of his new composition, The Genesis Suite, based on the music of the progressive rock band Genesis. The suite was recorded that same year at Abbey Road Studios.

It is composed of seven movements, based on different songs from the band. The first movement is a "filmic" adaptation of the two songs "Land of Confusion" and "Tonight, Tonight, Tonight". The second is based on "Ripples", which is for Piano and Orchestra. The third movement is a Concertante Fantasy for Violin and Orchestra, based on the song "Mad Man Moon", and is the longest piece in the suite (at 16 minutes 40 seconds long). The fourth movement is a shorter adaptation of "Follow You Follow Me". The fifth movement is based on "Fading Lights". The penultimate movement is a solo piano adaptation of "Entangled". The final movement, echoing the character of the opening movement, is a "filmic" adaptation of the two songs "Undertow" and "Blood on the Rooftops".

== Soundtracks ==
1. Q.E.D.;
2. Where the Heart Is;
3. The First Snow of Winter (Silver Fox Films, 1999);
4. Second Star To The Left (Silver Fox Films, 2001);
5. Fighting the War (BBC 2, 2003)

== Musical scores ==
- The Criminal (Paramount Home Entertainment UK, 2000)

== Discography ==
1. R. Strauss – Don Juan, Tod und Verklärung; Horn Concerto no 1 (conductor, artist: Frank Lloyd, ASV Records, 1997);
2. The Singer (conductor, artist: Lesley Garrett, EMI Classics, 2002);
3. Queen Symphony (conductor and composer, performed by London Voices, London Oratory School Choir, Royal Philharmonic Orchestra, EMI Classics, 2002);
4. The Revealing (conductor, artist and composer: Roland Chadwick, performed by English Chamber Orchestra, New Classical, 2004);
5. Choreography (producer and arranger, artist: Vanessa-Mae, Sony Classical Records, 2004);
6. Variations (producer and arranger, artist: Maksim Mrvica, EMI, 2004);
7. Best Days (conductor, artist: Amy Nuttall, performed by London Metropolitan Orchestra, EMI Classics, 2005)
8. The Great 2008 Seotaiji Symphony with Tolga Kashif and Royal Philharmonic (Music Director, Conductor, Arranged[for live], artist: Seotaiji, Natalia Lomeiko, Royal Philharmonic Orchestra, Seotaiji Company, 2009);
9. The Genesis Suite – Tolga Kashif & London Symphony Orchestra, 2010 LMG1

== Awards ==
- Classical Brit Awards Album of the Year nomination for Queen Symphony, 2003
