= Silver Dream Racer =

- Directed by: David Wickes
- Written by: David Wickes
- Based on: story by Michael Billington
- Produced by: David Wickes
- Starring: David Essex
- Cinematography: Paul Beeson
- Music by: David Essex
- Production company: Rank Film Productions
- Distributed by: The Rank Organisation
- Release date: 26 March 1980 (London)
- Running time: 111 minutes (UK); 101 minutes (U.S.)
- Country: United Kingdom
- Language: English
- Budget: $5 million

Silver Dream Racer is a 1980 motor-racing film starring British pop star David Essex and Beau Bridges. The film was produced, written and directed by David Wickes.

It was the last film to be directly made by the Rank Organisation.

== Plot ==
Nick Freeman (David Essex) is an aspiring motorcycle racer, whose brother has been developing an experimental motorcycle. When his brother dies before being able to test and race the new bike, Nick inherits the responsibility to prove his brother's design. In spite of a series of tough setbacks, including the loss of his girlfriend, Nick goes into the big race at the British Grand Prix with all his energy and concentration bent on winning. However, an underhanded American racer (Beau Bridges) is also among the competitors, and is determined to ruin Nick's chances. Numerous incidents happen before Nick crosses the finish line in first place. Two completely different endings were filmed depicting Nick after he has won the race in the UK and US, and both versions were released.

== Cast ==
- David Essex as Nick Freeman
- Beau Bridges as Bruce McBride
- Cristina Raines as Julie Prince
- Clarke Peters as Cider Jones
- Harry H. Corbett as Wiggins
- Diane Keen as Tina Freeman
- Lee Montague as Jack Freeman
- Sheila White as Carol
- Patrick Ryecart as Benson
- Ed Bishop as Al Peterson
- T. P. McKenna as Bank Manager
- David Baxt as Ben Mendoza
- Barrie Rutter as Privateer
- Steve Henshaw as privateer
- Doyle Richmond as Cider's Brother
- Nick Brimble as Jack Davis
- Malya Woolf as Mrs. Buonaguidi
- Stephen Hoye as Clarke Nichols
- Richard LeParmentier as Journalist
- Murray Kash as 1st TV Reporter
- Bruce Boa as 2nd TV Reporter
- Christopher Driscoll as Photographer
- Leslie Schofield as Reporter
- Robert Russell as Garage Mechanic
- Morris Perry as Financier
- Elisabeth Sladen as Bank Secretary (as Elizabeth Sladen)
- Jim McManus as Bike Salesman
- Antony Brown as Executive
- Edward Kalinski as Disco Boy
- Joanna Andrews as Disco Girl
- Vincent Wong as 1st Japanese Man
- Cecil Cheng as 2nd Japanese Man
- David Neville as Man at Bank
- Godfrey Jackman as Bank Doorman
- June Chadwick as Secretary
- Kate Harper as 1st Party Guest
- Derrie Powell as 2nd Party Guest
- Perry Cree as 3rd Party Guest

== Production ==
=== Development ===
In the late 1970s director David Wickes had enjoyed a box office success with the feature film version of The Sweeney and he was approached by Tony Williams of the Rank Organisation asking if Wickes had a film he wanted to make. The director had been sent a script about motorbike racing by actor Michael Billington which Wickes said, "needed a re-write, but I liked it because it was about a very human thing — dreaming the impossible dream. Tony Williams liked it too, so I went to see David Essex. I thought he might be interested because he was a keen biker himself."

Essex was a pop star who had starred in the hit films That'll Be the Day and Stardust, as well as enjoying a great success playing Che Guevera on stage in the original West End production of Evita. Essex had recently turned down the title role in The Stud but he not only agreed to appear in Silver Dream Racer, he signed on to write the film's score. Essex later called the film "a blast from start to finish. It was to represent quite a commitment, as I had signed up to write the film score as well as play the lead role, but if I am honest, the appeal to me was all about the motorbikes."

Wickes, who rewrote the script, said the film nearly was not made because of difficulties sourcing a 500cc racing bike ("all the big manufacturers have their own racing teams and they won't give you the time of day") but they were rescued by "a brilliant Welsh engineering company called Barton Motors" who produced "a great-looking bike that could go respectably fast around a track".

Tuesday Weld had talks about playing the female lead. She eventually took another role, and Cristina Raines, who had been in The Duellists, was cast instead. Beau Bridges was imported from the USA to co-star.

=== Shooting ===
Filming took place in August 1979 at Pinewood Studios and on location. Some scenes were filmed during the 1979 Grand Prix at Silverstone, Northamptonshire. "I think we still hold the record for using 16 Panavision cameras on a single day", said Wickes.

The Silver Dream Racer was a real motorcycle, designed by Barry Hart of the Barton company. The cost of this was more than £40,000.

English motorcycle racer Roger Marshall did most of David Essex's riding for the film.

Two different endings were shot. Rank wanted one ending and Wickes and Essex another; the latter got their way.

Essex wrote the score in association with John Cameron. The two enjoyed working together and Cameron subsequently collaborated with Essex on the latter's next album, Hot Love.

== Release ==
The film had its premiere on 26 March 1980 at the Dominion Theatre in London before opening to the public the following day.

== Reception ==
=== Critical ===
The Guardian said "the story is as boring as hell". The Evening Standard said the story "is nothing to write – indeed drive – home about... But Wickes' hand and eye are acute... you'll get more than you expect."

The Los Angeles Times called it a "lively genre piece".

Filmink called it "the sort of movie that sounds good in shorthand... but it's yet another Rank movie which found a way to drain excitement out of the story. This film needed to be made by people who understood Roger Corman filmmaking – it needed more pace, sex, action, tension. It has its fans."

=== Box office ===
According to Wickes, "The picture did pretty well in the UK but a lot better overseas. Most of the reviews were favourable, and David's song 'Silver Dream Machine' went to number two." Essex said the film did "spectacularly well in South Africa, where it seemed to run for years".

== Notes ==
- Essex, David (2012). Over the Moon: My Autobiography.
