= Richard LeParmentier =

American actor (1946–2013)

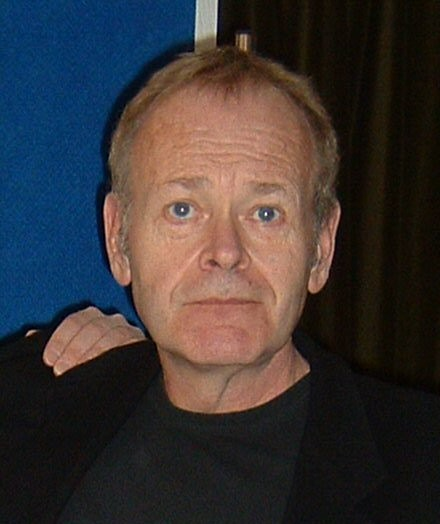
- LeParmentier, January 2004
- Born: July 16, 1946; Pittsburgh, Pennsylvania, U.S.
- Died: April 15, 2013 (aged 66); Austin, Texas, U.S.
- Occupations: Actor, scriptwriter
- Years active: 1974–2013
- Spouses: Sarah Douglas (m. 1981; div. 1984): Cheryl Le Parmentier (m. 198?)
- Children: 3

Richard LeParmentier (July 16, 1946 – April 15, 2013) was an American actor who lived and worked primarily in the United Kingdom, best known for his role as Admiral Motti in Star Wars Episode IV: A New Hope (1977) and the acerbic police officer Lt. Santino in Who Framed Roger Rabbit (1988). He is credited under several variations of his name, including Richard Parmentier, Rick Le Parmentier and Richard LeParmentiere.

== Early life ==
LeParmentier, born near Pittsburgh, Pennsylvania in the United States on July 16, 1946, grew up on a dairy farm. His father was Edgar LeParmentier, who came from the isle of Guernsey and his mother Maureen was from County Mayo in Ireland. LeParmentier lived in Hollywood, Florida at 1415 Adams St, Hollywood, FL 33020 during his teen years, and it was there his school drama-teacher suggested he become a professional actor. He attended a drama course at Wayne State University in Detroit, Michigan before moving to the United Kingdom in 1974.

== Career ==
LeParmentier as Admiral Motti in Star Wars Episode IV: A New Hope

After appearing in a Fringe theatre production that was broadcast by the BBC, LeParmentier was granted an Equity union membership card and toured with the Incubus Theatre Company. His first film role was as lawyer Felix Hoffman in the 1974's Stardust and the following year he appeared in the film Rollerball. He also made numerous appearances on British television. His most prominent role was that of Admiral Motti, the arrogant, mocking Imperial officer who is choked by Darth Vader in Star Wars (1977), after Vader finds his "lack of faith disturbing". Mark Newbold, writing on the official Star Wars website, described the role as leaving "an indelible imprint on the Star Wars galaxy, helping to illustrate the fearsome powers of Lord Vader as well as the arrogance and malice of a bloated and over-confident Empire." LeParmentier had auditioned for the role of Han Solo, one of the film's main characters. The auditions for Star Wars were also used for Brian DePalma's Carrie and LeParmentier was cast as the high school principal in the latter. The film's production was delayed for nine months, so LeParmentier had to drop out of the role, with his role being recast to Stefan Gierasch. For Star Wars he was initially offered a two-line role as a "Mos Eisley bureaucrat named Montross." However, before production began, the character was ultimately omitted from the film. The following month LeParmentier was cast as Motti.

LeParmentier had a minor role in Superman II with his then-wife Sarah Douglas. He also had roles in films such as Octopussy (1983) and Who Framed Roger Rabbit (1988) as Lt. Santino. His last screen role was in 1992, and from 1988 his focus became largely writing and producing. He wrote for several British television series including The Bill and Boon, with his writing partner Paddy Fletcher. He founded the production company Three Rivers Productions in 2008. LeParmentier became a "staple" of the Star Wars and science-fiction convention circuit, and made a cameo appearance in an online commercial for the 2012 Xbox 360 video game Kinect Star Wars, which re-created his famous scene from Star Wars. At the time of his death, he was working on Motti Now, a parody of Apocalypse Now, featuring other Star Wars alumni such as Kenneth Colley, Jeremy Bulloch, Garrick Hagon and Jerome Blake.

== Personal life and death ==
From 1981 to 1984, LeParmentier was married to the British actress Sarah Douglas, who is best known for playing the role of Ursa in Superman and Superman II. The two appeared in several films together, including Rollerball, The People That Time Forgot, and Superman II.

He had three children with his second wife, Cheryl Le Parmentier, whom he later divorced, he was staying with them at the time of his death.

LeParmentier lived in Bath, Somerset, England. He died on April 15, 2013, while visiting his family in Austin, Texas, United States, aged 66.

== Filmography ==
=== Film ===
Year	Title	Role	Notes	Ref.
1974	Stardust	Felix Hoffman		
1975	Rollerball	Bartholomew's Aide		
1977	Blind Man's Bluff	Mr. Oliver		
1977	Star Wars	Admiral Motti		
1977	The People That Time Forgot	Lieutenant Whitby		
1977	Valentino	The Sheik		
1979	The Music Machine	Jay Reltano		
1980	Silver Dream Racer	Journalist		
1980	Superman II	Reporter		
1981	Reds	Man Drinking with Pete Van Wherry	Uncredited	
1983	Octopussy	Lt. Col. Stewart		
1988	Who Framed Roger Rabbit	Lieutenant Santino		
1992	The Berlin Conspiracy	Colonel Gurnheim		

=== Television ===
Year	Title	Role	Notes	Ref.
1977	Space: 1999	Ed Malcolm	Episode: "Dorzak"	
1978	Return of the Saint	Demmell	Episode: The Imprudent Professor	
1978	Lillie	Third Reporter	Episode: America	
1978	The One and Only Phyllis Dixey	G.I. at Box Office	TV film	
1982	We'll Meet Again	Captain Lester Carson	6 episodes	
1987	London Embassy	Al Sanger	Episode: An Unofficial English Rose	
1989	Screen Two	Eddie	Episode: Defrosting the Fridge	
1989–1990	Capital City	Lee Wolf	18 episodes	

=== Video games ===
- Soldiers: Heroes of World War II (2004) (video game) (voice) - American Narrator
