= Ray Connolly =

British writer (born 1940)

- Born: 4 December 1940 (age 85); Lancashire, England
- Occupations: Author, journalist and screenwriter

Ray Connolly (born 4 December 1940) is a British writer. He is best known for his journalism and for writing the screenplays for the films That'll Be the Day and its sequel Stardust, for which he won a Writers' Guild of Great Britain Best Screenplay award.

== Early life ==
Connolly was born and brought up in Lancashire. He was educated at West Park Catholic Grammar School (St. Helens), Ormskirk Grammar School, and the London School of Economics (LSE), where he read social anthropology. There, he edited the LSE magazine Clare Market Review and was an associate editor of the student film magazine Motion.

== Career ==
After entering journalism as a graduate trainee at the Liverpool Daily Post, Connolly then moved to the London Evening Standard where he interviewed, among others, many 1960s and 1970s rock stars and cultural icons, including the Beatles, Muhammad Ali and Elvis Presley. Many of his interviews with the Beatles are collected in The Ray Connolly Beatles Archive, while other interviews are collected in Stardust Memories – Talking About My Generation. He was due to interview John Lennon on the day the ex-Beatle was murdered, an event he wrote about in the BBC radio play Unimaginable. In 2018, he published the biography, Being John Lennon – A Restless Life.

He has written many articles for the Daily Mail, as well as The Sunday Times, The Times, The Daily Telegraph and The Observer.

His novels include: A Girl Who Came to Stay, Newsdeath, Sunday Morning, Shadows on a Wall and Love out of Season (which was adapted for radio as God Bless Our Love) and Sorry, Boys, You Failed the Audition. His biography of Elvis Presley, Being Elvis – A Lonely Life, was published in 2016.

For the cinema he wrote the films That'll Be the Day and its sequel, Stardust – which was voted the Best Screenplay of 1974 by the Writers' Guild of Great Britain. He also wrote and directed the feature-length documentary entitled James Dean: The First American Teenager, while his television drama series have included Honky Tonk Heroes, Lytton's Diary and Perfect Scoundrels. TV films include Forever Young for Channel 4 and Defrosting the Fridge for the BBC, while he co-wrote, with Alan Benson, the BBC 2 George Martin series about music The Rhythm of Life.

He has also written several radio plays, including Lost Fortnight (which is about Raymond Chandler in Hollywood), the series Tim Merryman's Days of Clover, and Sorry, Boys, You Failed the Audition, as well as several short stories for various publications, which are collected in A Handful of Love.

== Personal life ==
Connolly is married, has three children and two grandchildren, and lives with his wife, Plum, in London.

In 2020, he contracted COVID-19, and spent almost six months in hospital, including 103 days in intensive care, an experience he turned into the BBC Radio 4 play Devoted. It was broadcast in March 2021.
