= Damian Collier =

British entrepreneur and producer

- Born: March 1976 (age 50); London, England, United Kingdom
- Occupations: Entrepreneur, businessman, lawyer, film producer
- Years active: 2003-present
- Known for: Viral Spiral, Blend Media
- Spouse: Anna-Marie Wayne
- Children: 2

Damian Collier is a British entrepreneur, businessman, lawyer, and producer. He is the founder and former owner and CEO of Spiral Viral, a company designed to help the creators of unexpectedly viral videos with the legal side of things, and the founder, owner, and CEO of Blend Media, a VR licensing firm and marketplace. He produced the musical, filming, and tour of Jeff Wayne's The War of the Worlds – Alive on Stage! and manages the Jeff Wayne Music Group. Other film productions include War of the Worlds. In 2014, he appeared on Fast Company's Most Creative People in Business 1000.

== Education ==
Collier attended University of Reading's School of Law and subsequently worked at firms including Latham & Watkins, Goldman Sachs, and Linklaters, the latter of which he stayed with from 1993 until 2003. He also briefly attended the University of Salamanca in Spain.

== Career ==
Collier was the managing director of Jeff Wayne Music Group, and in 2006 produced the tour for The War of the Worlds – Alive on Stage! He and Wayne collaborated with Dark Horse Entertainment to create an accompanying comic. While promoting Wayne's newest concept album, Collier met with Howard Davies-Carr, the father of the boys in the viral video "Charlie Bit My Finger," as they wanted to use the video for promotional purposes. Davies-Carr mentioned that he had been approached many times by people and companies wanting to use the video and Collier realized that the people behind viral videos were not being supported. As a former finance lawyer, with experience in licensing and intellectual property, he created Viral Management Limited, called Viral Spiral, in 2011 to help manage viral videos; the Davies-Carr family was his first client. Jeff Wayne was his business partner. Clients included the creators behind "Sneezing Baby Panda," "Talking Twin Babies," and "Fenton!" By 2012, Viral Spiral had offices in the United Kingdom, United States, and Japan, and had "plans for a You've Been Framed!-style television show" Viral Spiral set up deals for their clients with major companies such as The Coca-Cola Company, Samsung, BBC, and Comedy Central. They also partnered with Rightster to make more "Charlie" content, including partnerships with Sprint and Google, and gave the company "exclusive distribution rights to all of Viral Spiral's YouTube content." Viral Spiral was among the first multi-channel networks to sign Vine stars as clients. In 2014, Collier sold the company to the Rightster Group, a B2B video network.

In 2016, Collier founded Blend Media, a company that licenses AR, MR, VR, and 360-degree content and connects brands and agencies with qualified content creators. Blend Media is involved with influencer marketing as well. In 2019, he became the executive producer of a VR game based on Jeff Wayne's The War of the Worlds and in 2021, helped turn "Charlie Bit Me" into a limited-edition NFT.

== Personal life ==
Collier is married to actress Anna-Marie Wayne, daughter of his business partner Jeff Wayne. The couple have two children and as of 2022 live in the Hertfordshire village of Radlett. Their daughter was born premature, arriving 9 weeks before she was due. Their son Jonah appears in Michael Hirst's 2022 television series Billy the Kid.

== Film ==
Collier largely produced under the Damian Collier Entertainment banner between 2009 and 2015.

Year	Title	Role(s)	Ref
2003	Weird Travels	Camera operator	
2003	Dance with Lisa: Red Hot Salsa Made Simple	Cinematographer	
2005	The Book of Tennis Chronicles	Executive producer	
2005	War of the Worlds	Executive producer, screenwriter, producer	
2006	Jeff Wayne's Musical Version of The War of the Worlds	Producer	
2006	Prophets of Science Fiction	Material supplier	
2007	The War of the Worlds – Alive on Stage!	Producer	
2008	Evilution	Co-producer	
2009	Disappearing in America	Associate producer	
2009	Space Girls in Beverly Hills	Cinematographer	
2013	Jeff Wayne's Musical Version of The War of the Worlds – The New Generation	Producer	
TBD	Paradise Lost	Producer	
TBD	The Car	Executive producer	
