= The Piano Player (Maksim Mrvica album) =

Studio album by Maksim Mrvica
- Released: December 23, 2003
- Recorded: 2001–2003
- Genre: Crossover, classical
- Length: 55:07 (13 Tracks)
- Label: EMI
- Producer: Mel Bush, Jeff Wayne, Ian Wherry, Tonči Huljić, Niksa Bratos, Remi Kazinoti

Maksim Mrvica chronology
Gestures (1999)	The Piano Player (2003)	Variations Part I&II (2004)

The Piano Player is a 2003 music album created by Maksim Mrvica. The album was released with the Copy Control protection system in some regions.

== Track listing ==
1. Flight of the Bumble-Bee – 4:25 (Nikolai Rimsky-Korsakov/Jeff Wayne)
2. Grieg's Piano Concerto in A Minor – 4:04 (Edvard Grieg)
3. Exodus – 3:09 (Ernest Gold)
4. Claudine – 4:29 (Tonči Huljić)
5. Wonderland – 3:38 (Tonči Huljić)
6. Handel's Sarabande – 3:37 (George Frideric Handel)
7. Rhapsody on a Theme of Paganini – 10:08 (Sergei Rachmaninov/Jeff Wayne)
8. Hana's Eyes – 4:31 (Tonči Huljić)
9. Chopin's Revolutionary Etude in C Minor – 3:52 (Frédéric Chopin)
10. Cubana – 3:08 (Tonči Huljić)
11. Croatian Rhapsody – 3:32 (Tonči Huljić)
12. Dance of the Baroness – 2:51 (Frano Parač)
13. Cubana Cubana – 3:28 (Bonus Track) (Tonči Huljić)

=== Special Bonus AVCD edition ===
1. "Format Data, Not Playable"
2. "The Piano Player Interview" (Video)
3. "Maksim's World Premiere Performance at The Roundhouse, London (Excerpt)" (Video)
4. "The Flight of the Bumble Bee" (Video)
5. "Exodus" (Video)
6. "Grieg's Piano Concerto" (Video)
7. "Claudine" (Video)
8. "Photo Gallery (music: Claudine)"
9. "The flight of the bumble-Bee (DRUM Remix)" (Audio)
10. "The flight of the bumble-Bee / Breathe (The ChynaHouse Remix) Maksim featuring Terry Lee and JG (Urban Xchange)" (Audio)
11. "Sarabande - Whiteburn (Chillout)" (Audio)
12. "Sarabande - Whiteburn (Transmix)" (Audio)

== Trivia ==
„Croatian Rhapsody” was first performed by Magazin under name Cronika at Croatian selection for Eurovision Song Contest 2000 representative, whose Huljić was member at the time. Song lost to Goran Karan's „Ostani” and finished 5th with 101 points.
