= Gonna Make You a Star =

"Gonna Make You A Star"

Single by David Essex

from the album David Essex
- B-side: "Window"
- Released: 27 September 1974
- Genre: Glam rock; pop rock
- Length: 3:47
- Label: CBS
- Songwriter: David Essex
- Producer: Jeff Wayne

David Essex singles chronology
"America" (1974)	"Gonna Make You A Star" (1974)	"Stardust" (1974)

"Gonna Make You A Star" is a pop/rock recording by David Essex. Written by David Essex and produced by Jeff Wayne, "Gonna Make You a Star" was Essex's first number one, spending three weeks at the top of the UK Singles Chart in November 1974. It peaked at number 105 on the Billboard Hot 100 chart in the USA. The record featured prominent use of the synthesizer.

In 2007 the song was released in a version by Lee Mead, winner of the Any Dream Will Do BBC One TV competition, which was shown in spring 2009 in the US on BBC America. Mead then starred in the title role for 18 months in Andrew Lloyd Webber's West End revival of Joseph and the Amazing Technicolor Dreamcoat. British comedian Peter Kay had his character Marc Park release Gonna Make You a Star as his first single after winning the fictional Talent Trek competition in his 2000 Channel 4 spoof documentary series That Peter Kay Thing.

The song was featured in Essex's jukebox musical All the Fun of the Fair.

== Charts ==
=== Weekly charts ===
Chart (1974–1975)	Peak position
Australian Singles (Kent Music Report)	4
Belgium (Ultratop 50 Flanders)	16
Belgium (Ultratop 50 Wallonia)	44
Ireland (IRMA)	1
Netherlands (Single Top 100)	14
UK Singles (Official Charts)	1
West Germany (GfK)	43

=== Year-end charts ===
Chart (1975)	Peak position
Australian Singles (Kent Music Report)	46

== Certifications ==
Region	Certification	Certified units/sales
United Kingdom (BPI)	Gold	500,000^{^}
^{^} Shipments figures based on certification alone.
