= Rock On (David Essex album) =

Studio album by David Essex
- Released: 2 November 1973
- Recorded: 1973
- Studios: Advision Studios, London
- Genres: Art rock; glam rock
- Length: 34:24
- Labels: CBS; Columbia
- Producer: Jeff Wayne

David Essex chronology
Rock On (1973)	David Essex (1974)

Singles from Rock On
- 1. "Rock On" Released: 27 July 1973; 2. "Lamplight" Released: 2 November 1973

Professional ratings
Review scores
Source	Rating
Allmusic	4.5/5 stars

Rock On is the debut album of English singer/songwriter David Essex. Its lead single and title track, "Rock On", is still Essex's best known song in the United States. "Lamplight" was also a hit, and the album contains three covers.

== Track listing ==
All tracks are written by David Essex, except where noted.

Side one
No.	Title	Writer(s)	Length
1.	"Lamplight"		2:56
2.	"Turn Me Loose"	Doc Pomus, Mort Shuman	2:18
3.	"On and On"		2:51
4.	"Streetfight"		3:50
5.	"Rock On"		3:24

Side two
No.	Title	Writer(s)	Length
6.	"Ocean Girl"		3:10
7.	"Bring in the Sun"	Jeff Wayne, Tony Hertz	4:36
8.	"For Emily, Whenever I May Find Her"	Paul Simon	2:56
9.	"We All Insane"		3:03
10.	"Tell Him No"	Travis Pritchett	3:58
11.	"September 15th"		1:22
Total length:			34:24

== Personnel ==
Musicians

- David Essex – vocals
- Julie Covington, Doreen Chanter, Irene Chanter, Jimmy Helms, Gary Osborne, Jimmy Thomas, Paul Vigrass, Billy Laurie, Tom Saffrey – backing vocals
- Jeff Wayne, Alan Hawkshaw – Moog synthesizer
- Mark Griffiths, Jo Partridge, Kirby Gregory – guitar
- Herbie Flowers – bass guitar
- Ray Cooper – percussion
- Barry de Souza – drums
- John Morton – Ondes Martinot

Technical

- Gary Martin – engineer
- Jeff Wayne – producer, arranger, conductor
- London Weekend Television – photography

== Charts ==
Chart (1973–74)	Peak position
Australian Albums (Kent Music Report)	37
Canada Top Albums/CDs (RPM)	24
UK Albums (Official Charts)	7
US Billboard 200	32

== Certifications ==
Region	Certification	Certified units/sales
United Kingdom (BPI)	Silver	60,000^{^}
^{^} Shipments figures based on certification alone.
