= Variations Part I & II =

Variations Part I&II

Studio album by Maksim Mrvica
- Released: 2004
- Recorded: Various locations
- Genres: Crossover, classical
- Label: EMI Records
- Producers: Orion; Whiteburn; Tolga Kashif; Simon Kiln

Maksim Mrvica chronology
The Piano Player (2003)	Variations Part I&II (2004)	A New World (2005)

Variations Part I&II is Croatian pianist Maksim Mrvica's third album, including his first (non-international) album, "Gestures".

== Track listing ==
1. Kolibre (Tonči Huljić) – 3:45
2. Piano Concerto No. 1 in B-flat minor, Op. 23 (Pyotr Ilyich Tchaikovsky) – 4:05
3. Merry Christmas Mr. Lawrence (Ryuichi Sakamoto) – 3:50
4. Totentanz (Franz Liszt) – 4:41
5. Olympic Dream (David Essex) – 3:48
6. Amazonic (Tonči Huljić) – 3:20
7. LeeLoo's Tune (Tonči Huljić) – 3:52
8. Procession of The Sardar (from Caucasian Sketches, Suite No. 1) (Mikhail Ippolitov-Ivanov) – 4:10
9. Bohemian Rhapsody (Freddie Mercury) – 6:41
10. Pictures at an Exhibition (Modest Mussorgsky) – 12:28
11. Etude in D-sharp minor, Op. 8, No. 12 (Alexander Scriabin) – 4:12
12. Nocturne Op. 9, No. 2 in E-flat Major (Frédéric Chopin) – 5:00
13. Aria From Goldberg Variations (Johann Sebastian Bach) – 3:58
14. Pagrag (Niccolò Paganini/Maksim Mrvica) – 5:30

== Charts ==
Chart performance for Variations Part I & II
Chart (2004)	Peak position
Croatian International Albums (HDU)	1
