= Oh What a Circus =

Single by David Essex
- B-side: "High Flying, Adored"
- Released: 4 August 1978
- Recorded: 1978
- Genre: Pop
- Length: 3:54
- Label: Mercury
- Composer: Andrew Lloyd Webber
- Lyricist: Tim Rice
- Producer: Mike Batt

David Essex singles chronology
"Stay with Me" (1978)	"Oh What a Circus" (1978)	"Brave New World" (1978)

"Oh What a Circus" is a song from the 1976 musical Evita, which had lyrics by Tim Rice and music by Andrew Lloyd Webber. It was recorded by English singer David Essex and released as a single on 4 August 1978, by Mercury Records. Essex played the character of Che in the original London production of the musical, and the song is sung from his point of view. Produced and arranged by Mike Batt, (who also provided the chant-like backing and forefront vocals). "Oh What a Circus" is a mid-tempo song, comparing the musical's title character Eva Perón's funeral with a circus, and calling her actions fraudulent. The song is a contrafactum, and shares its tune with the better known "Don't Cry for Me Argentina" from the same show.

"Oh What a Circus" was a commercial success for Essex, who had been dropped by his previous record company due to his declining sales. The song reached number 3 on the UK Singles Chart, and the top-30 in Belgium and Netherlands. In subsequent productions of the musical, "Oh What a Circus" has been sung by numerous performers, including Mandy Patinkin, Ricky Martin and Scottish rock musician Marti Pellow. In the 1996 film adaptation of the show, the song was sung by Antonio Banderas and American singer Madonna, and received critical appreciation for its flamenco-infused composition.

== Background and release ==
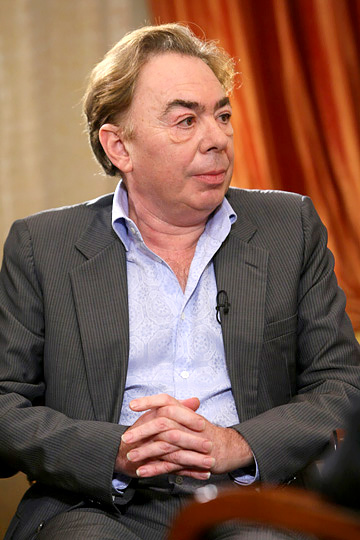
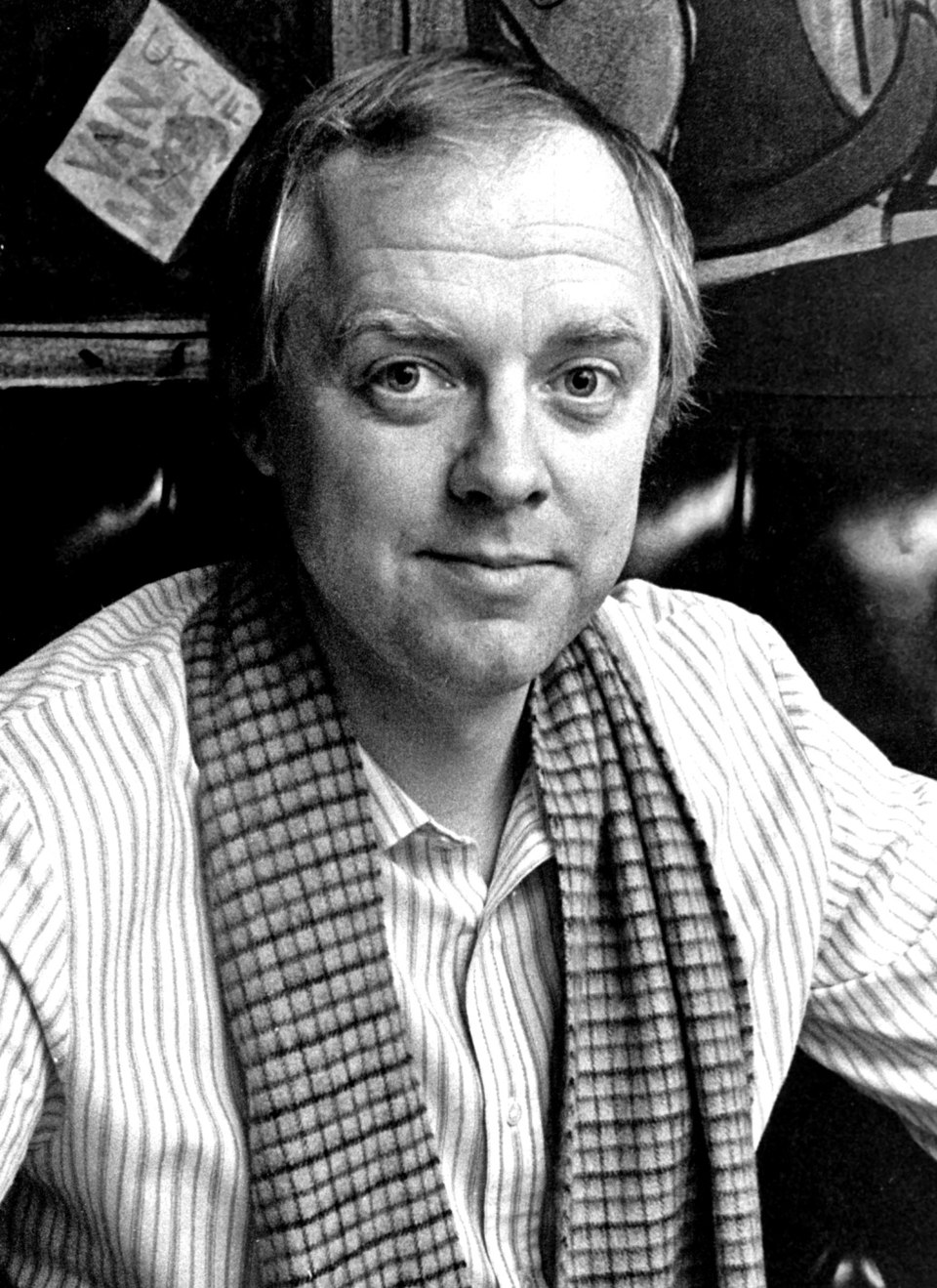
Co-writers of "Oh What a Circus", Andrew Lloyd Webber and Tim Rice

"Oh What a Circus" was written by Andrew Lloyd Webber and Tim Rice while they were developing Evita as a musical in between 1974 and 1976. Rice was extremely intrigued by the stories surrounding the life of Eva Perón while researching her during the mid-1970s. The duo were also on the lookout for various actors to play the part of the narrator for Evita.

In the meantime, English singer David Essex had completed his work on Jeff Wayne's Musical Version of The War of the Worlds, and was interested in theatrical productions. He received a call from Rice and Webber, and immediately accepted the part. Evita had already generated interest with its concept album of the same name, as well as the commercial success of singer Julie Covington's released single, "Don't Cry for Me Argentina". Essex met director Hal Prince and talked about the character of Che, an Argentine everyman narrating and commenting on the events, portrayed as Che Guevara on stage, including the vision that Rice and Webber had about him. Due to his Romany ancestry, Essex had the characteristic laconic nature and idealistic looks needed for the role of Che.

Evita was a success from its opening night, with Derek Jewell of The Sunday Times praising Webber's score, as well as Essex's portrayal of Che as a "brooding, enigmatic" character. Meanwhile, Essex had released a cover version of the Lorraine Ellison song, "Stay with Me", which reached number 45 on the UK Singles Chart, thus CBS Records cancelled their contract with him. Essex's manager started looking for a new record deal for him, and signed one with Phonogram Records, who suggested that he release one of the songs from the Evita album as his single. They decided to release "Oh What a Circus", with another of Che's songs, "High Flying, Adored" as its B-side. The song was released on August 19, 1978, under the Mercury subsidiary of Phonogram in the United Kingdom.

== Composition and reception ==
Musically, "Oh What a Circus" is a contrafactum, and shares its composition with the better known "Don't Cry for Me Argentina" from the same show, but has a faster tempo and completely different lyrics. The song includes a choral chant in Latin, based on the Catholic anthem "Salve Regina". Alternative lyrics to "Don't Cry for Me Argentina" appear as a prelude to the song from Act 2, sung by a young girl characterizing Eva's younger self. The version of "Oh What a Circus" present on the Evita concept album was sung by Colm Wilkinson. However, it was not used. Instead, Essex recorded a new version which was arranged and produced by Mike Batt, in the style of Phil Spector. A video for the song was filmed at Clifton Cathedral in Bristol and showed Essex singing the song as a crowd moves around inside a building carrying candles.

"Oh What a Circus"
A 24 second clip of "Oh What a Circus" where Essex sings the opening verses, where he compares the life of Eva to that of a circus. The choir can be heard around the 17 second mark, as Essex's voice spans the chord progression of C–Am/C–Dsus.

An uptempo version of the main melody for "Don't Cry for Me Argentina", "Oh What a Circus" acts as an introduction to the whole musical and is sung after "Requiem for Evita", as Che ponders about the life of Eva. The song was composed in a key of E major. Essex's voice spans from C♯_{3} to E_{5} and the song follows a basic sequence of F/C–G_{7}–C–Am/C–Dsus–C–D_{7}/C–G/B as its chord progression. Lyrically, it talks about the news of Eva's death and her funeral, as well as Che's belief that the mourning for her was misplaced and Eva's life and preaching was fraudulent. It compares her funeral to that of a circus with a choir added during the middle section. The lyrics question the sainthood of Eva and her praise as a godly character among the Argentinians, while taunting her that she had failed her people by not being immortal. The words had rhyming across the verses like those of ("show/go") and ("town/down") which Rice explained was done intentionally to make the song appear asymmetrical.

Oh what a circus, oh what a show, Argentina has gone to town
Over the death of an actress called Eva Perón
Oh what an exit, that's how to go, When they're ringing your curtain down
Demand to be buried like Eva Perón

After its release in August 1978 as the third single from the Evita concept album, "Oh What a Circus" entered the UK Singles Chart at number 36. It progressed and climbed the charts rapidly, ultimately reaching a peak of number 3 in its sixth week. It was Essex's highest charting song since "Hold Me Close" had topped the charts in 1975. "Oh What a Circus" was present within the top-100 of the UK Singles Chart for a total of 11 weeks. Across Europe the song charted in Belgium for 5 weeks, reaching a peak of number 26. In the Netherlands, the song charted on both the Dutch Top 40 and Single Top 100 charts, reaching peaks of number 18 and number 20 respectively. The song also charted at number eight in Ireland. Although not released in Australia, the song managed to enter the Kent Music Report charts for one week at number 72.

== Other versions ==
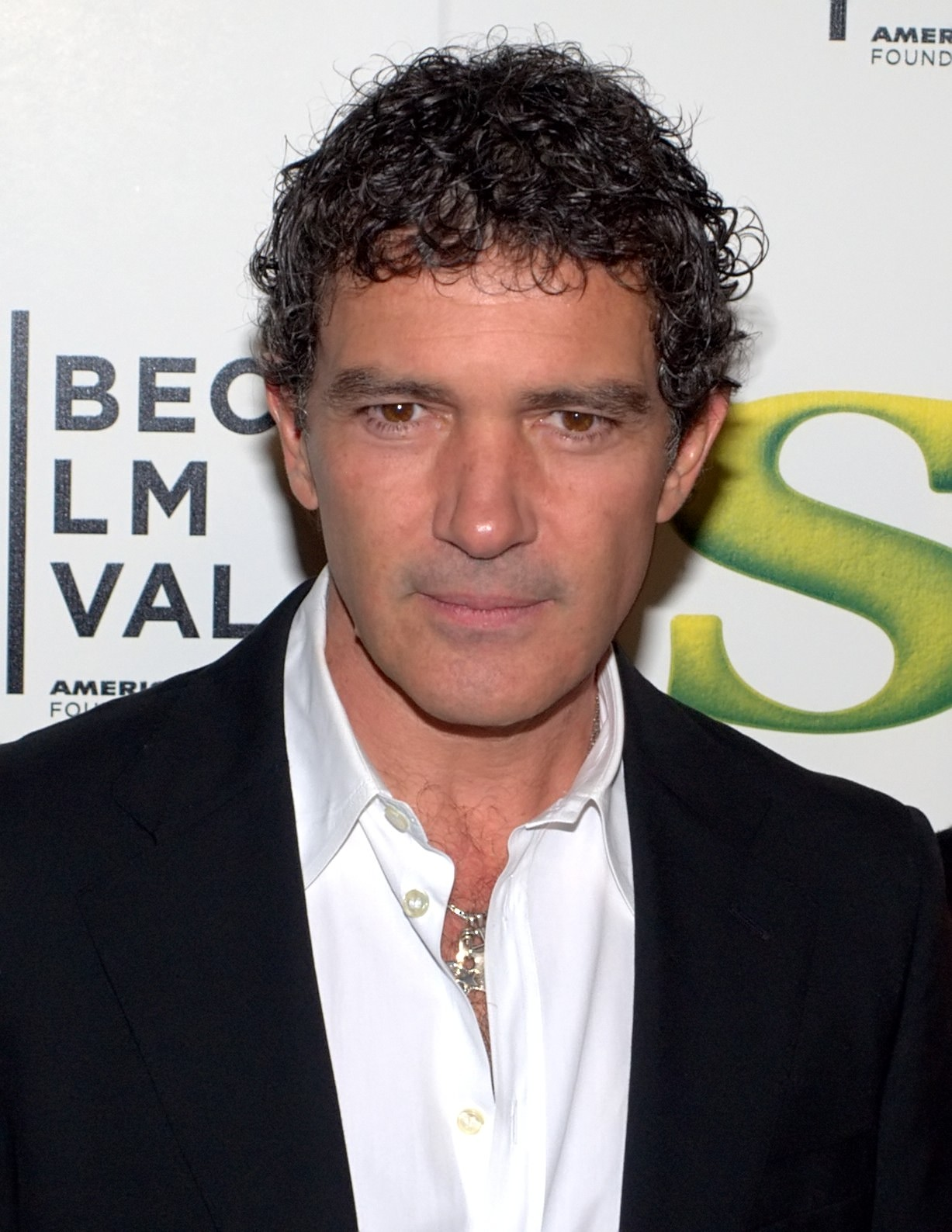
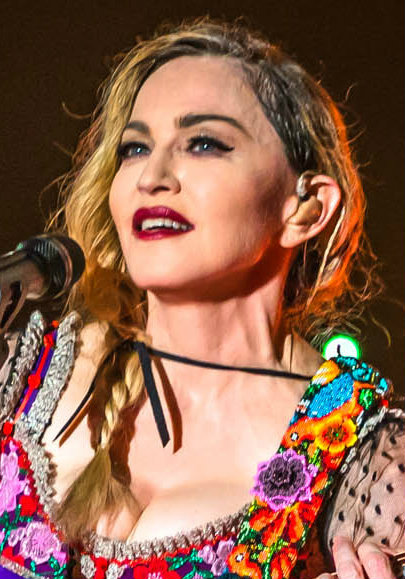
Antonio Banderas and Madonna's version of the song was critically appreciated.

Mandy Patinkin played Che for the American premiere production and recording, and sings the song. Author William A. Everett wrote in his book The A to Z of the Broadway Musical that Patinkin's singing and portrayal of Che "interacted on a psychological level with the title character (played by Patti LuPone), challenging her actions and motivations." In the 1996 film Evita, the song is sung by actor Antonio Banderas and singer Madonna. In the film, Che muses while in an empty bar following the lavish funeral procession for Eva Perón, and then on the streets of Buenos Aires as the community mourns and then riots. Eva's lyrics come during a pan over her funeral casket and is not sung directly by Eva. It begins with Spanish guitars as Banderas takes the lead vocals, with a changing choir throughout.

A different rhythm and tempo occurs in the middle where the main composition has rock influences and piano, as Banderas uttered the line, "She didn't say much, but she said it loud". The choir is brought back towards the end, followed by an orchestral passage consisting of the main theme, accompanied by sounds of gong and timpani. Madonna sings the final verses, uttering the lines "share my glory, so share my coffin". Author J. Randy Taraborrelli complimented Madonna's singing in the book, Madonna: An Intimate Biography, describing her vocals as "supple and strong". This view was shared by author Lucy O'Brien in Madonna: Like an Icon who said that "the sweetness and the power of Madonna's voice comes out as never before on these tracks". It also received positive review from Paul Verna of Billboard, who listed the "flamenco flavored" song as a highlight from the soundtrack.

For the 2006 First West End Revival of Evita, actor Matt Rawle portrayed Che and sang the song. Michael Billington from The Guardian received it negatively, saying that "Lacking any coherent idea, the show is motored by a succession of Lloyd Webber songs: 'Another Suitcase in Another Hall', ... 'Oh What a Circus', 'High Flying, Adored' and all the rest." While reviving the play for Broadway in 2012, singer Ricky Martin was signed to play Che. According to Joe Dziemianowicz from Daily News, Martin's performance as Che gave it "a great big touch of star quality... He also gives an appealing performance in the role of Che," the writer added. James Hebert from The San Diego Union-Tribune complimented Martin for setting "the tone right away in the opening number 'Oh What a Circus'" with his "bemused, smilingly cynical" characterization of Che. In the 2014 Second West End Revival of the play, the role of Che was played by Marti Pellow from Scottish rock band Wet Wet Wet. Natalie Banyard complimented the choice of Pellow as Che, adding in an article for Bristol Post that "Never was there a more inspired piece of casting than that of [Pellow] as [Che Guevara] in Evita." Banyard also noticed that there was "no hint of Marti's Scottish brogue as he stops the show with his renditions of 'Oh What a Circus' and 'The Lady's Got Potential'." Hank Marvin performed an instrumental version of the song on his 1997 album Hank Marvin and the Shadows Play the Music of Andrew Lloyd Webber and Tim Rice.

== Track listing ==
- UK 7" single
1. "Oh What a Circus" – 3:54
2. "High Flying, Adored" – 3:19

== Credits and personnel ==
- David Essex – vocals
- Tim Rice – songwriter
- Andrew Lloyd Webber – songwriter, composer
- Mike Batt – producer, arrangement
- Tony Bridge – mastering at Pye Studios

Credits adapted from the 7" single liner notes.

== Charts ==
Chart (1978)	Peak position
Australia (Kent Music Report)	72
Belgium (Ultratop 50 Flanders)	26
Ireland (IRMA)	8
Netherlands (Dutch Top 40)	18
Netherlands (Single Top 100)	20
UK Singles (Official Charts)	3
