= A Winter's Tale (David Essex song) =

Single by David Essex

from the album The Whisper
- Language: English
- Released: November 1982
- Recorded: 1982
- Genre: Soft rock, Christmas
- Length: 4:10
- Composer: Mike Batt
- Lyricists: Mike Batt, Tim Rice
- Producer: Mike Batt

"A Winter's Tale" is a song performed by David Essex on the 1983 album The Whisper. First released as a single in 1982, it reached #2 in the UK singles chart in January 1983, kept off #1 by Phil Collins's cover version of "You Can't Hurry Love".

== Production and release ==
"A Winter's Tale" was written by Mike Batt and Tim Rice in late 1982 in response to a request from Essex. Mike Batt said in a recent radio programme on Three Counties Radio that the song, alongside "Please Don't Fall in Love" and "I Feel Like Buddy Holly", was written about a relationship of his that wouldn't work for geographical reasons. However, he has now been married to that lady for 40 years. It was released as a single in November 1982. It spent ten weeks in the UK chart, peaking at No. 2 on 15 January 1983. Later in 1983, the song was included on Essex's album The Whisper.

== Legacy ==
Some time after the song's release, Tim Rice wrote an additional, third verse.

The Moody Blues included the song on their last album December (2003)

"A Winter's Tale" was used to open the musical All the Fun of the Fair, launched in 2008, in which it was performed by Louise English.

A 2008 article by Asian News International saw "A Winter's Tale" placed as the fourth worst Christmas song. However, in 2014 The Independent reported a list of 50 Best Christmas songs by PRS for Music, ranking "A Winter's Tale" as the 34th best Christmas song.
