= Royal Philharmonic Orchestra discography =

The Royal Philharmonic Orchestra, founded in London in 1946, has made a large number of recordings.

Composer	Works	Year
Various	The Beach Boys with the Royal Philharmonic Orchestra	2018
Berlioz	Harold in Italy, King Lear Overture, Le Corsaire Overture, Les Francs-Juges Overture, Les Troyens Overture, Roman Carnival Overture, Symphonie Fantastique, Trojan March, Waverley Overture	
Bernstein	Candide, Symphonies 1–3, West Side Story	
Berwald	Symphonies, overtures and tone poems (Björlin)	
Bizet	Symphony "Roma", La Jolie Fille de Perth suite, L'Arlésienne Suites 1 and 2, Patrie Overture, Boccherini Overture in D	
Borodin	Polovtsian Dances	
Cacciapaglia	Quarto Tempo, 10th Anniversary Edition	2017
Chabrier	España, Joyeuse marche	
Cherubini	Overture Anacréon	
Debussy	Cortège and Air de danse, Prélude à l'Après midi d'un faune	
Delibes	Le Roi s'amuse	
Delius	Brigg Fair, Dance Rhapsody No 2, Fennimore and Gerda Intermezzo, Florida Suite Daybreak and Dance, Irmelin Prelude, On Hearing the First Cuckoo in Spring, Sleigh ride, Song before Sunrise, Summer Evening, Summer Night on the River	
Dvořák	Legend in G minor, Symphony No 8	
Goldmark	Rustic Wedding Symphony	
Gounod	Faust ballet music, Le sommeil de Juliette	
Grétry	Zémire et Azor ballet music	
Grieg	Symphonic dance in A, Piano Concerto in A minor (René Leibowitz)	
Handel	Amaryllis, Love in Bath, Messiah, Solomon, The Faithful Shepherd, The Gods Go A'Begging	
Haydn	Symphonies 93–104, The Seasons	
Hisaishi	A Symphonic Celebration	2023
Holst	The Planets Suite; St. Paul's Suite	
Illayaraja aka Gnanadesikan	The first Asian Music Composer to score a Full Symphony for the Royal Philharmonic Orchestra.	1993
Pachelbel	Canon	
Mahler	Symphonies	
Massenet	Last sleep of the Virgin, Waltz from Cendrillon	
Mendelssohn	Fair Melusine Overture, Symphony No 4, Italian	
Meyerbeer	Le prophète complete, (Lewis)	
mixed composers	Christmas Connection, with The Chicago Synthesizer-Rhythm Ensemble, and Ann Mortifee	1985
Mozart	Clarinet Concerto, Die Zauberflöte Overture, Flute and Harp Concerto, German Dance K. 605, Haffner March K. 249, Haffner March K. 249, Minuet from Divertimento in D K. 131, Symphony No 41, Thamos Entr'acte, The Seraglio.	
Mozart	Serenade No. 13 for strings in G major ("Eine kleine Nachtmusik"), K. 525; Piano Concerto No. 21 in C major ("Elvira Madigan") K. 467; Piano Concerto No. 26 in D major ("Coronation") K. 537; Die Entführung aus dem Serail (The Abduction from the Seraglio), opera, K. 384; Symphony No. 40 in G minor, K. 550; Così fan tutte, opera, K. 588; Symphony No. 35 in D major ("Haffner"), K. 385; Symphony No. 31 in D major ("Paris"), K. 297 (K. 300a); Le nozze di Figaro (The Marriage of Figaro), opera, K. 492; Piano Concerto No. 20 in D minor, K. 466; Violin Concerto No. 3 in G major, K. 216; Piano Sonata No. 11 in A major ("Alla Turca") K. 331 (K. 300i); Die Zauberflöte (The Magic Flute), opera, K. 620; Symphony No. 39 in E flat major, K. 543; Piano Concerto No. 23 in A major, K. 488,	2004
Mussorgsky	Khovantchina Dance of the Persian Slaves, Pictures at an Exhibition (Ravel)	
Various	plays the Queen Collection	1982
Offenbach	Les Contes d'Hoffman suite	
Rachmaninoff	Rhapsody on a Theme of Paganini (Yuri Temirkanov)	
Rimsky-Korsakov	Scheherazade	
Rossini	La Gazza Ladra Overture, Le Cambiale di Matrimonio Overture, Semiramide Overture; Guillaume Tell complete (Gardelli)	
Saint-Saëns	Rouet d'Omphale, Samson et Dalila: Dance of the Priestesses/ Bacchanale	
Schubert	Symphony No 1, Symphony No 2, Symphony No 3, Symphony No 5, Symphony No 6, Symphony No 8	
Sibelius	Valse Triste, Symphonies 6 and 7	
Smetana	Die Moldau, Bartered Bride: Overture and Polka	
Stravinsky	The Firebird, Petrushka, The Rite of Spring (On Air)	2022
Johann Strauss	Die Fledermaus, Emperor Waltz	
Richard Strauss	Ein Heldenleben	
Franz von Suppé	Overtures: Morning Noon and Night in Vienna, Poet and Peasant	
Tchaikovsky	Eugene Onegin – waltz, Symphony No 4, The Nutcracker	
Verdi	La traviata (Ceccato)	
Wagner	Die Meistersinger Suite, Flying Dutchman Overture, Götterdämmerung Funeral March and Rhine Journey, Lohengrin Prelude, Parsifal Karfreitagszauber, Die Meistersinger Prelude, Ride of the Valkries; Siegfried Idyll (Monteux)	
Yoshiki	Art of Life	
