= Stardust (David Essex song) =

Song by David Essex

from the album David Essex and Stardust soundtrack
- Released: November 1974
- Recorded: May–June 1974
- Label: CBS
- Songwriter(s): David Essex
- Producer(s): Jeff Wayne

"Stardust" is a 1974 song by David Essex, written by the singer, and produced by Jeff Wayne. The single on CBS Records reached No.7 on the UK Charts. The song was the theme song to Essex's film Stardust, and was released almost simultaneously on two albums; firstly his own CBS album David Essex in September, and then with 9 other David Essex-penned songs on the Stardust (soundtrack) on Ronco, timed for the October film release. The B-side was "Miss Sweetness", also written by Essex.
