= Mutiny! (musical) =

1985 musical by David Essex

Mutiny! is a musical by David Essex to a book and lyrics by Richard Crane, based on the novel Mutiny on the Bounty by Charles Nordhoff and James Norman Hall.

== First Album ==
The musical was recorded for Phonogram before staged performance as a concept album in 1983 featuring David Essex, Frank Finlay, Victor Spinetti, Nicky Henson, Charles Mindenhall, Doreen Chanter, and The Royal Philharmonic Orchestra. The Mercury release of the album placed in the UK album charts for 4 weeks 15/10/1983 to 05/11/1983, reaching 39. It produced one Top 10 hit single "Tahiti". Other charting singles were "Falling Angels Riding", "Welcome" and "Friends".

== Staged performances ==
Mutiny! opened at the Piccadilly Theatre in July 1985 with Essex in the role of Fletcher Christian, and Frank Finlay as Captain William Bligh with Sinitta as Maimiti. The production ran for over 500 performances and was nominated for 'Best Musical' at the 1986 Ivor Novello Awards.

== Second album ==
The Original Cast Recording of Mutiny! was recorded in August 1985 for RCA Ariola.
