= All the Fun of the Fair (David Essex album) =

Studio album by David Essex
- Released: 12 September 1975
- Genre: Pop
- Length: 41:00
- Label: CBS
- Producer: Jeff Wayne

David Essex chronology
David Essex (1974)	All the Fun of the Fair (1975)	Out on the Street (1976)

Singles from All the Fun of the Fair
- 1. "Hold Me Close" Released: September 1975

Professional ratings
Review scores
Source	Rating
AllMusic	3.5/5 stars
Sounds (magazine)	NR

All the Fun of the Fair is the third studio album by David Essex, released in 1975.

== Track listing ==
Side one
No.	Title	Length
1.	"All the Fun of the Fair"	6:45
2.	"Hold Me Close"	3:55
3.	"Circles"	5:00
4.	"If I Could"	4:15
5.	"Rolling Stone"	5:30
Total length:		23:45

Side two
No.	Title	Length
1.	"Won't Get Burned Again"	3:40
2.	"Coconut Ice"	3:30
3.	"Watch Out (Carolina)"	3:50
4.	"Here It Comes Again"	5:00
5.	"Funfair (Reprise)"	2:35
Total length:		17:55

== Charts ==
Chart (1975-76)	Peak position
Australian Albums (Kent Music Report)	6
UK Albums (Official Charts)	3

Chart (2008)	Peak position
Scottish Albums (Official Charts)	38
UK Albums (Official Charts)	23

== Certifications ==
Region	Certification	Certified units/sales
United Kingdom (BPI)	Gold	100,000^{^}
^{^} Shipments figures based on certification alone.
