= Silver Dream Machine =

Single by David Essex

from the album Silver Dream Racer
- A-side: "Silver Dream Machine" (Part One)
- B-side: "Silver Dream Machine" (Part Two)
- Released: March 1980
- Genre: Pop rock
- Length: 3:38 (Part One); 3:22 (Part Two)
- Label: Mercury
- Songwriter(s): David Essex
- Producer(s): David Essex

David Essex singles chronology
"World" (1980)	"Silver Dream Machine" (1980)	"Hot Love" (1980)

"Silver Dream Machine" is a song by David Essex released in March 1980 as a single from the film Silver Dream Racer in which Essex also starred. Despite the film's commercial failure, Silver Dream Machine reached number 4 on the UK Singles Charts, making the song Essex's sixth top 5 hit.

== Charts ==
Chart (1980)	Peak position
Ireland (IRMA)	3
UK Singles (OCC)	4
