= Stardust (1974 film) =

- Theatrical release poster
- Directed by: Michael Apted
- Written by: Ray Connolly
- Produced by: David Puttnam; Sanford Lieberson
- Starring: David Essex; Adam Faith; Larry Hagman; Keith Moon
- Cinematography: Anthony B. Richmond
- Edited by: Michael Bradsell
- Production company: Goodtimes Enterprises
- Distributed by: Anglo-EMI Film Distributors
- Release date: 24 October 1974 (London)
- Running time: 111 minutes
- Country: United Kingdom
- Language: English
- Budget: £555,000
- Box office: £600,000 (UK)

Stardust is a 1974 British musical drama film directed by Michael Apted and starring David Essex, Adam Faith, and Larry Hagman. It is the sequel to the 1973 film That'll Be the Day, which introduced the characters of Jim MacLaine and his street-smart friend Mike Menary. It chronicles Jim's rise and fall as an international rock star during the 1960s and early 1970s, with Mike as his personal manager. It features a number of pop/rock performers, including Essex, Faith, Keith Moon, Marty Wilde, Dave Edmunds, Paul Nicholas and Edd Byrnes.

== Plot ==
On the evening of the Kennedy assassination, Jim MacLaine visits his friend Mike Menary at the funfair where Mike works. Jim tells Mike he's joined a touring rock group called the Stray Cats and invites Mike to come along as their road manager, pointing out that Mike could make millions if the group succeeds. Mike accepts and proves to be a shrewd operator, arranging a better van, accommodations, and a recording session for the group. Privately, Mike tells Jim that arrogant singer/ guitarist Johnny must go in order for the band to be a success. Largely through Mike's efforts, the Stray Cats have their first hit single with a song sung by Jim, even though it was released as the B-side to a song sung by Johnny. Jim becomes the new center of attention for fans and press, causing the jealous Johnny to leave the band.

The Stray Cats embark on a successful tour of the US, where they meet their new manager, Porter Lee Austin, a wealthy Texan who has bought a majority financial interest in Jim and the group. The other Stray Cats, especially drummer J.D., are frustrated at being ignored while Jim, promoted by Porter Lee and Mike, becomes the focus of media attention. Jim, supported by his new girlfriend Danielle, objects to Porter Lee's treatment of him and his music as a commercial commodity.

Jim's mother suddenly dies, and Jim, Danielle and Mike return to England for her funeral. There, Jim sees his wife Jeanette (whom he abandoned, but never bothered to divorce) and his young son. Jeanette wants nothing further to do with Jim and is living with another man, who has stepped into the father role for Jim's son. The funeral is mobbed by Jim's fans and Danielle is upset that Jim never told her he was married.

Back in the US, J.D. and the other Stray Cats inform Jim they are severing ties with him, leaving him as a solo act with no close friends except Mike and Danielle. Jim embarks on an ambitious project to compose and sing a progressive rock opera glorifying women, in honour of his late mother. When Danielle clashes with Porter Lee and then insinuates Mike is sexually attracted to Jim, Mike arranges for her to catch Jim having sex with another woman, causing her to walk out. Jim's rock opera, broadcast live to a worldwide audience of millions, is a huge success, but Jim, tired of his rock star life, moves to an isolated castle in Spain and becomes a recluse. Mike, who by now is acting as Jim's handler and caretaker, lives with him, but old resentments between the two soon surface.

After two years, Porter Lee pushes Jim to come out of seclusion in order to make money to cover unpaid taxes and avoid being forgotten by his public. A major live television interview is planned, but on the day of the interview, the mentally fragile and drug-addled Jim refuses to come out of his room. Mike, whose friendship with Jim has deteriorated, coldly orders him to come out and do his job. Jim finally emerges and starts to do the interview, but gives rude responses and then starts to laugh uncontrollably. Mike, the only one to realize that Jim has overdosed on drugs, rushes to call an ambulance, but Jim dies on the way to the hospital.

== Cast ==
- David Essex as Jim MacLaine
- Adam Faith as Mike Menary
- Larry Hagman as Porter Lee Austin
- Ines Des Longchamps as Danielle
- Rosalind Ayres as Jeanette MacLaine
- Marty Wilde as Colin Day
- Charlotte Cornwell as Sally Potter
- Edd Byrnes as Himself - TV Interviewer
- Keith Moon as J. D. Clover
- Dave Edmunds as Alex
- Paul Nicholas as Johnny
- Karl Howman as Stevie
- Richard LeParmentier as Felix Hoffman (credited as Rick Le Parmentier)
- Peter Duncan as Kevin
- John Normington as Ronald Harrap
- James Hazeldine as Brian
- David Daker as Ralph Woods
- David Jacobs as Himself
- Stanley Sheff as The Audio Tech (uncredited)

Ray Winstone is seen briefly as an uncredited extra in an early club performance scene in his first film appearance.

== Production ==
=== Development ===
Screenwriter Ray Connolly, who developed both That'll Be the Day and Stardust with producer David Puttnam, wrote about the making of Stardust in 2017.

Connolly said he and Puttnam were thinking about a sequel to That'll Be the Day even before the latter film was released, and they went on holiday to Italy to plan it. "This time we knew we were going to make a film about rock," wrote Connolly. "It was the story of young Britain in the Sixties."

Puttnam wanted to set the story in the early sixties while Connolly wanted it to go until the seventies. They compromised and the story encompassed the whole sixties.

The film originally had the title of Sooner or Later.

That'll Be the Day was directed by Claude Whatham but he and Puttnam clashed during filming so it was decided to get a new director. The film was offered to Alan Parker who had worked with Puttnam in advertising but Parker decided to make The Evacuees instead. The job went to Michael Apted who had been the first choice to direct That'll Be the Day and had recently begun work in features with Triple Echo.

Apted said Stardust is "about the media, success, drugs, isolation, and a lot of other things... We merely put up the idea that pop heroes are often created by other people, not themselves, and the whole awful business is usually deceiving and self destructive."

Finance came from Nat Cohen of EMI Films, who had helped finance the original, and Columbia Pictures.

=== Casting ===
David Essex, Rosalind Ayres, and Keith Moon all reprised their roles from That'll Be the Day. Karl Howman also appears in both films, though his character name is Johnny in That'll Be the Day and 'Stevie' in Stardust, and it is not made clear if Paul Nicholas's 'Johnny' in Stardust is the same character as the one originally played by Howman. After making That'll Be the Day Essex had become a pop star himself with the record Rock On.

Connolly wrote that the role of the band's American manager was originally written as an Italian-American from the Bronx with Tony Curtis in mind, but when Curtis proved too expensive, native Texan Larry Hagman was cast and the part was rewritten as a Texan. Hagman credited his work in Stardust with helping him develop his later character of oil baron J.R. Ewing on the TV series Dallas.

According to Connolly, Adam Faith was cast after Ringo Starr, who had played "Mike" in That'll Be the Day, declined to appear in the sequel because "having lived through the experience in reality as a member of the Beatles he wasn't keen to revisit it." Michael Brooks wrote that Starr declined because of "an uncomfortable resemblance between a key subplot and the real-life story of Pete Best's departure from the Beatles."

=== Filming ===
Filming began on 18 February 1974. Location filming was done in Britain, Spain (Castillo de La Calahorra), and the United States. Essex had recently become a real-life rock star with his 1973 hit song "Rock On", and was mobbed by a large crowd of his actual fans while filming the funeral scene at St. Bernard's Church in Northolt, London.

Musician Dave Edmunds recorded the new music used in the movie "virtually as a one-man band".

Connolly said "For David Essex, it can't have been easy to play a rock star as his own rock fame was growing by the day. But it wasn't easy for Keith Moon either, who would now be central to our fictional band. With The Who he was used to fan adoration as he played to stadiums, but to us he was just another actor playing a small part – which didn't always sit well with his ego."

== Reception ==
=== Box office ===
The film was a hit at the box office and by 1985 had earned an estimated £525,000 in profit.

=== Critical ===
Essex wrote in his memoirs that he did not feel Stardust was as "truthful" as That'll Be the Day which he felt "had been a very British film whereas I think with Stardust the producers had one eye on doing well in America, which may have been partly why we went to film there. It was a good movie, but it ended up being a little bit mid-Atlantic."

== Awards and nominations ==
BAFTA Writers' Guild of Great Britain for Best Original British Screenplay WINNER: Ray Connolly.

BAFTA Best Supporting Actor NOMINATED: Adam Faith.

== Soundtrack ==
The Stardust soundtrack album was released in October 1974 on Ronco Records to coincide with the opening. Some of the later songs in the film were performed by the artists in the film's fictional Stray Cats themselves.

- Neil Sedaka – "Happy Birthday Sweet Sixteen"
- The Drifters – "Up On The Roof"
- Del Shannon – "Hats Off to Larry"
- The Zombies – "She's Not There"
- Bobby Darin – "Dream Lover"
- Billy J. Kramer & The Dakotas – "Do You Want To Know A Secret"
- Dave Edmunds & The Electricians – "Da Doo Ron Ron"
- The Beach Boys – "I Get Around"
- Diana Ross & The Supremes – "Baby Love"
- The Chiffons – "One Fine Day"
- Tommy Roe – "Dizzy"
- The Fortunes – "You've Got Your Troubles"
- Martha Reeves & The Vandellas – "Dancing In The Street"
- Gerry & The Pacemakers – "Don't Let the Sun Catch You Crying"
- Stevie Wonder – "Uptight"
- Cat Stevens – "Matthew & Son"
- Barbara Lewis – "Baby I'm Yours"
- Jimmy Ruffin – "What Becomes Of The Brokenhearted"
- The Box Tops – "The Letter"
- The Mamas And The Papas – "Monday Monday"
- The Lovin' Spoonful – "Summer in the City"
- Manfred Mann – "Do Wah Diddy Diddy"
- The Animals – "The House of the Rising Sun"
- The Hollies – "Carrie Anne"
- Procol Harum – "Whiter Shade Of Pale"
- The Who – "My Generation"
- The Bee Gees – "I've Gotta Get A Message To You"
- The Righteous Brothers – "You've Lost That Lovin' Feelin'"
- Barry McGuire – "Eve of Destruction"
- Jefferson Airplane – "White Rabbit"
- Jimi Hendrix – "All Along The Watchtower"
- Derek & The Dominos – "Layla"
- Joe Cocker – "With A Little Help From My Friends"
- The Stray Cats – "When Will I Be Loved"
- The Stray Cats – "Need A Shot Of Rhythm & Blues"
- The Stray Cats – "Make Me Good"
- Jim Maclaine And The Stray Cats – "You Kept Me Waiting"
- The Stray Cats – "Let It Be Me"
- The Stray Cats – "Some Other Guy"
- Jim Maclaine And The Stray Cats – "Take It Away"
- The Stray Cats – "C'Mon Little Dixie"
- Jim Maclaine – "Americana Stray Cat Blues"
- Jim Maclaine – "Dea Sancta"
- David Essex – "Stardust"

== Charts ==
| Chart (1975) | Peak position |
|---|---|
| Australia (Kent Music Report) | 7 |

== Legacy ==
The film is the sequel to the 1973 film That'll Be the Day, in which Essex played the younger Jim MacLaine throughout the 1950s and early 1960s.

An independent radio drama recording project, That'll be the Stardust!, was released in 2008. The story follows the musical journey of Jim MacLaine's son, Jimmy MacLaine Jr.

== Notes ==
- Essex, David (2012). Over the moon : my autobiography. Virgin.
- Yule, Andrew (1989). Enigma : David Puttnam, the story so far ... Sphere Books.
