= Rock On (David Essex song) =

Single by David Essex

Single by David Essex

from the album Rock On
- B-side: "On and On"
- Released: August 1973
- Recorded: 1973
- Genre: Glam rock; avant-pop
- Length: 3:24
- Label: Columbia
- Songwriter: David Essex
- Producer: Jeff Wayne

David Essex singles chronology
"The Spark That Lights the Flame" (1971)	"Rock On" (1973)	"Lamplight" (1973)

Official audio
- "Rock On" on YouTube

"Rock On" is a song written by English singer David Essex. Recorded in 1973 and released as a single by Essex, it became an international hit. In 1989, American actor and singer Michael Damian recorded a cover version that went to number one on the Billboard Hot 100 chart. The song has been recorded many times, including a 2006 version by the English hard rock group Def Leppard.

== David Essex recording ==
=== Background and release ===
The song, written and recorded by David Essex, was released in August 1973 in the UK, and reached its highest position of number 3 in the UK Singles Chart in September that year. It spent 11 weeks in the UK charts. In March 1974, Essex's version reached number one in Canada on the RPM national Top Singles chart and was a top-ten hit (reaching number 5) on the U.S. Billboard Hot 100 pop music chart. It was Essex's only Billboard top 40 song. "Rock On" was the title track of Essex's 1973 debut studio album, and was also featured on the soundtrack album of the 1973 film That'll Be the Day (as well as being played over the closing credits of the film's U.S. release) in which he had a starring role. The song is still frequently played on classic rock and oldies radio stations.

Essex later re-recorded the song in 1988 with an updated lyric. This version, which was remixed by Shep Pettibone, appeared on Essex's 1989 album Touching the Ghost. A single release of the updated version reached number 93 on the UK Singles Chart.

=== Arrangement and context ===
The song features a slow-tempo vocal performance in C♯ minor, along with a minimalist, rhythm-driven instrumental accompaniment to Essex's vocal performance. The lyric pays homage to early rock-and-roll and its surrounding youth subculture, and especially to 1950s rebel James Dean. This song makes reference to "Blue Suede Shoes" by Carl Perkins, and "Summertime Blues" by Eddie Cochran.

The distinctive stripped-back musical arrangement was devised by producer Jeff Wayne after hearing Essex's original vocal demo:

"'Rock On' was demonstrated to me in the studio after finishing the jingle session. And the way David demoed it for me was he went into the studio, our engineer put on a microphone and David picked up a trashcan and started banging out this little rhythm, so there was no instruments. Because there was no instruments, the engineer put on this sort of repeat echo, and it gave an atmosphere to it, and that's what I then went away to work on. I went away and thought about the song and the attractiveness was the hollows, the absences and the mood in the lyrics as well. And so I had this idea that there would nothing (sic) on it that played a chord, so that's why there's no keyboards, there's no guitars, there's nothing that plays a chord."

"When David wrote 'Rock On', it was the type of song that from my point of view as an arranger and producer gave me much more adventurous ideas, a concept of sound. A ballad is a ballad, whereas 'Rock On' allowed us to be a bit more off-the-wall. It was a gamble and a bit of a fight to get it through. But both David and I felt that 'Rock On' was a career-breaking record, whereas a ballad would give him a shorter-term success, it wouldn't distinguish him."

According to Wayne, only three session musicians played on the final backing track, and the most prominently featured was highly regarded session musician Herbie Flowers, whose double-tracked bass guitar was treated with a prominent "slapback" delay effect, creating a complex polyrhythmic backbeat:

"I can recall the three musicians on the backing track for 'Rock On' all looking around in a mostly empty Advision Studios, Studio 1, wanting to know when the rest of the band were arriving! I explained there weren't any others for that track, and I was relying on them to understand my idea for the production. While the drums and percussion parts were written out, it was definitely Herbie that grasped immediately that a bass guitar playing a lead riff could fill a large part of the spatial spectrum and he took my idea and turned some basic notes of mine, into his amazing bass riff. Then to top it off, he suggested playing it again an octave higher. So you get this unusual bass sound right up front – now it couldn't have been up front if the arrangement didn't allow the air and the space to be created that way."

Flowers himself noted that, as a reward for devising the double-tracked bass line, he was paid double his normal session fee, and thus received £24 instead of the usual £12. He had earlier created a similar double-tracked bass line for Lou Reed's "Walk on the Wild Side", explaining in a BBC Radio 4 interview that it had also been done because he would be paid double.

=== Legacy ===
Reappraising "Rock On" in Yeah Yeah Yeah: The Story of Modern Pop (2013), Bob Stanley wrote that it "was all about what wasn't there. The rubbery bassline was an echo of something played in 1956, caught like a sound corked in a bottle and released as a gas twenty years later. The whole song was akin to a spectre in a photograph, with its cat-ghost strings and Essex's half-asleep vocal summoning a lost era with random signifiers". He adds that its lyrics offer more questions than answers, and concludes that, "caked in echo and confusion", the song was "the sound of Britain in 1973." In Shock and Awe: Glam Rock and Its Legacy (2016), Simon Reynolds comments that Essex's music avoided straightforward 1950s revivalism, deeming "Rock On" and similar singles like "America" (1974) to be hypnotic and "stripped-down" records laden with "studio-warped" sounds, and as such were closer to Dr. John's "humid junglescapes", like "Craney Crow" (1971), and "the cinemascopic funk" of the Temptations' "Papa Was a Rolling Stone" (1972). Essex, who cited Dr. John as an influence and hero, was initially dubbed "the English Dr. John" by the rock media.

In Uncut, Marcello Carlin cites "Rock On" as an example of how "fucking weird" Essex's music was, writing: "Rarely has such a nostalgic record sounded so futuristic and yet somehow lost ('Which is the way that's clear?')". He also praises Wayne's "visionary" production, commenting that his "dub spaces and raised-eyebrow strings" provide "the missing link between Norman Whitfield and Lee Perry." Joe Banks of The Quietus describes "Rock On" as an "avant pop classic". According to Luke Haines in his Record Collector column, the song is "David Essex's million-selling, avant-garde, self-penned masterpiece." He adds: "We all know the stories of yards and yards of magnetic tape being spooled across pencils in the control room of Advision studio by producer Jeff Wayne, to achieve the poly-rhythmic delay. If David Essex had only made one record, then 'Rock On' would have been enough."

Ian McCann, also of Record Collector, cites "Rock On" alongside Lieutenant Pigeon's "The Villain" (1972) as attempts to "make dub from rock". He wrote that Essex launching his teen idol career "with a dub record" was novel, writing: "You can thank bassist Herbie Flowers for that, Essex himself for being brave and inventive enough to release it, producer Jeff Wayne, and engineer Gary Martin (Soft Machine, Yes, Gentle Giant, etc) at Advision, who made very sparse instrumentation sound like a lot with judicious use of effects." He commented that the track "remains a startlingly original single from a singer too often seen as no more than a pretty face." Discussing the history of dub-influenced rock in The Accidental Evolution of Rock 'n' Roll (1997), Chuck Eddy describes "Rock On" as "a feast of heart-murmur electronics, disco-ready strings, and Jimmy Dean hair tonic, atop a techno-Latin bump."

Dave Thompson of AllMusic writes that, on release, the song was "instantaneously established among the defining songs of the 1970s (not to mention David Essex's own career)" Circus writer Stephen Demorest described the "classic single" as dusky and menacing, with an "ominous quiet". Jude Rogers calls it a "peculiar, perfect dub-like" song. Rolling Stone highlight its "real mellow groove", and call it a "glam-rock anthem". Don Partridge of Melody Maker noted Wayne's background acquiring the "precise talents" of jingle writing led to his "masterful" production, citing "Rock On" as an example, as it is "built around a single bass riff, a stark arrangement only relieved by a soaring string section punctuating the chorus line. A superb example of economy used for effect."

=== Influence ===
Reynolds writes that, with "Rock On", Essex and Wayne "invented a personal micro-genre" and sound template which they repeatedly returned to with subsequent songs, including "Streetfight", "We All Insane" (both 1973), "Window", "America", "Good Ol Rock & Roll" (all 1974) and "Rolling Stone" (1975). R.E.M. frontman Michael Stipe considers "Rock On" to be one of his favourite ever songs, and paid homage to it on the band's song "Drive" (1992), issued as the first single from Automatic for the People. The chorus wryly echoes "Rock On" with its use of the line "Hey kids, rock and roll". Eddy notes the impact of "Rock On" on Def Leppard, writing that they quote it in "Rock of Ages" (1983); Eddy also partly roots the dub breakdown in "Rocket" (1987) to the use of dub in "Rock On" and songs by other glam rock artists like Gary Glitter and the Sweet. Reynolds also compares the "dub-cratered" sound of "Pour Some Sugar on Me" (1987) to "Rock On". Dance producer Shep Pettibone created a remix of "Rock On" for Essex's Touching the Ghost (1989).

Speaking in 1976, Essex said he was surprised by the success of "Rock On", but deemed to be "very sweet success because it was exactly what I wanted — the song, the production, the attitude — it's one of my favorite records, no matter whether I recorded it." In a 1991 interview, he said the song "crystalised and taught a lot of things to me because it was such a different record, such a different production, such a different song to anything that has ever been out. It was totally out on its own..."

=== Charts ===
Weekly Charts

Chart (1973–1974)	Peak position
Australian Singles (Kent Music Report)	8
Canada Top Singles (RPM)	1
Ireland (IRMA)	15
UK Singles (Official Charts)	3
US Billboard Hot 100	5
US Cash Box Top 100	1

Year-end Charts

Chart (1974)	Peak position
Australian Singles (Kent Music Report)	42
Canada Top Singles (RPM)	35
UK Singles (OCC)	33
US Billboard Hot 100	17
US Cash Box Top 100	8

=== Certifications ===
Region	Certification	Certified units/sales
United Kingdom (BPI)	Silver	250,000^{^}
United States (RIAA)	Gold	1,000,000^{^}
^{^} Shipments figures based on certification alone.

== Michael Damian version ==
"Rock On"

Single by Michael Damian

from the album Where Do We Go from Here
- B-side: "Where Is She?"
- Released: March 1989
- Genre: Glam rock; pop rock
- Length: 3:21
- Label: Cypress
- Songwriter: David Essex
- Producer: Larry Weir

Michael Damian singles chronology
"She Did It" (1981)	"Rock On" (1989)	"Cover Of Love" (1989)

=== Background and release ===
"Rock On" was covered by soap opera star and singer Michael Damian in 1989, and featured in the teen film Dream a Little Dream, starring Corey Haim, Corey Feldman, and Meredith Salenger among others.

=== Reception ===
"Rock On" became Damian's first hit in eight years, since his 1981 cover of Eric Carmen's song "She Did It". His rendition became a gold record. It reached the number one position on the Billboard Hot 100 chart, thus outperforming Essex's original Billboard ranking. However, the song did get to number one for Essex in 1974 on the US Cashbox Top 100, in the same week it was at number 11 on the Billboard charts. In addition, Haim, Feldman, and Meredith Salenger all appeared in Damian's music video for the song. This version was ranked number 99 on VH1's 100 Greatest One Hit Wonders of the 80s (despite the fact that Damian actually had four Billboard-charting singles during the 1980s).

=== Charts ===
Weekly charts
Chart (1989)	Peak position
Australia (Kent Music Report)	52
Canada RPM Top Singles	1
Germany	45
New Zealand (Listener)	18
US Billboard Hot 100	1
US Cash Box Top 100	1

Year-end charts
Chart (1989)	Rank
Canada Top Singles (RPM)	28
US Billboard Hot 100	45
US Cash Box Top 100	23

=== Certifications ===
Region	Certification	Certified units/sales
Canada (Music Canada)	Gold	50,000^{^}
United States (RIAA)	Gold	500,000^{^}
^{^} Shipments figures based on certification alone.

== Def Leppard version ==
"Rock On"

Single by Def Leppard

from the album Yeah!
- Released: May 2006
- Recorded: 2004
- Label: Mercury
- Songwriter: David Essex
- Producer: Def Leppard

Def Leppard singles chronology
"No Matter What" (2005)	"Rock On" (2006)	"20th Century Boy" (2006)

English hard rock band Def Leppard began playing the song on their 2005 tour in support of their compilation album Rock of Ages: The Definitive Collection along with a cover of Badfinger's "No Matter What" which appeared on the album. The band released a studio recording of the song as a digital single in May 2006 preceding the release of their album Yeah!, which features cover versions of 1970s rock hits. The single spent 18 weeks on the US Hard Rock chart, peaking at No. 18 in June 2006. The song has since become a staple in Def Leppard's setlists, often following a Rick Savage's bass solo. "We took that one to pieces and rewrote it…" observed Joe Elliott. "American radio still plays 'Rock On' every day, sandwiched between Lynyrd Skynyrd and Zeppelin." The radio remix version of the song also appeared on Def Leppard's 2018 compilation album The Story So Far – The Best Of.

== See also ==
- List of 1970s one-hit wonders in the United States
