= Hold Me Close =

Song by David Essex

Single by David Essex

from the album All the Fun of the Fair
- Released: September 1975
- Recorded: 1975
- Genre: Pop
- Length: 3:06
- Label: CBS Records
- Songwriter(s): David Essex
- Producer(s): Jeff Wayne

David Essex singles chronology
"Rolling Stone" (1975)	"Hold Me Close" (1975)	"If I Could" (1975)

"Hold Me Close" is a pop song written and performed by English singer and actor David Essex. The song was released in September 1975 and reached number one on the UK Singles Chart, where it remained for three weeks.

== Song profile ==
"Hold Me Close" is a love song written by Essex and produced by Jeff Wayne. It was Essex's second and final UK chart-topper. The B-side was titled "Good Ol' Rock and Roll" (live version). The song appears on the album All the Fun of the Fair, and is featured in the musical of that name.

== Charts ==
=== Weekly charts ===
Chart (1975–1976)	Peak position
Australia (Kent Music Report)	2
UK Singles (OCC)	1
Rhodesia (Rhodesia Singles Chart)	1

=== Year-end charts ===
Chart (1976)	Peak position
Australia (Kent Music Report)	25
