= David Essex =

English singer-songwriter and actor (born 1947)

David Essex OBE
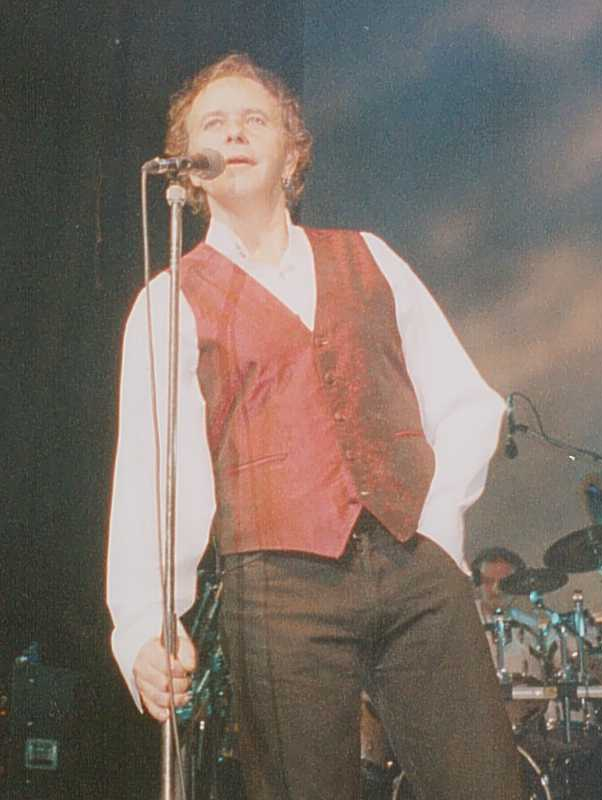
- Essex performing in 1987

Background information
- Born: David Albert Cook; 23 July 1947 (age 79); Plaistow, Essex, England
- Genres: Glam rock, pop, musical theatre, rock and roll
- Occupations: Singer, songwriter, actor
- Instrument: Vocals
- Years active: 1963–present
- Labels: Columbia, Lamplight
- Website: davidessex.com

David Essex (born David Albert Cook; 23 July 1947) is an English singer-songwriter and actor. From 1973 to 1994, he had nineteen Top-40 singles in the UK (including two number ones) and sixteen Top-40 albums. Internationally, he had the most success with his 1973 single "Rock On".

Essex has also had an extensive career as an actor, which includes a nomination for the BAFTA Award for Most Promising Newcomer to Leading Film Roles for the film That'll Be the Day (1973) and a nomination for the Laurence Olivier Award for Best Performance in a Musical for Evita in 1978.

== Early life ==
Essex was born in Plaistow, Essex (now an area in the London Borough of Newham, included within Greater London) on 23 July 1947. His father, Albert, was an East End docker and his mother, Olive (née Kemp), was a self-taught pianist and an Irish Traveller. His grandfather, Thomas Kemp, was nicknamed "Philimore", which was the anglicised version of "Philly Mor" – being Irish for "Big Philly". Essex was two years old when his parents moved out of the overcrowded home the family was sharing with relatives, to Canning Town where he grew up.

Essex attended Star Lane Primary School. He loved playing football and did not answer any of the questions in the Eleven plus exam for entry into a grammar school, so that he could ensure he attended Shipman County Secondary School where he knew they played the game. He later attended The Warren secondary modern in Whalebone Lane, Chadwell Heath, when his parents moved to Marks Gate Estate. He was also a member of West Ham United Juniors for a while, and dreamed of one day being a professional player. He then also became interested in music and played drums with a local band (China Plates), before becoming a singer.

== Career ==
=== Early career ===
Essex made his first record, titled "And the Tears Came Tumbling Down", for the Fontana label in 1965. He then toured with a band called 'David Essex and the Mood Indigo' for two years, and released a further seven singles in the 1960s. He also recorded two songs, "A Rose" and "Leon and John and Billy and Me" which remain unreleased, but exist as acetates. His first notable acting role, aside from small appearances in the films Assault and All Coppers Are..., was the lead in the stage musical Godspell in 1971 at the age of 23.

Two years later, he starred in the film That'll Be the Day (1973) and recorded his international hit single, the self-penned "Rock On", in the same year. It sold over one million copies, and was awarded a gold disc by the R.I.A.A. in March 1974. It was nominated for a Grammy and reached No. 5 on the Billboard Hot 100. A second single, "Lamplight", also reached the Top 10 in the UK singles chart.

In the 1970s, Essex emerged as a performer of some note. Contrary to a claim made in his own biography, his first concert was at the Granada in East Ham on Saturday 2 November 1974, and not at the Odeon. His biggest hits during this decade included two UK number one singles: "Gonna Make You a Star" (1974) and "Hold Me Close" (1975). He also appeared in Stardust, a 1974 sequel to That'll Be the Day. The title song was another Top 10 hit. In 1976, Essex covered the Beatles song "Yesterday" for the musical documentary All This and World War II.

Essex's pop idol looks gave him a strong female fan base, and his British tours created scenes of hysteria reminiscent of Beatlemania. According to The Guinness Book of British Hit Singles, he was voted the number one British male vocalist in 1974, and was a teen idol for more than a decade.

=== Musical roles ===
After a couple of years (from November 1971) playing the lead in Godspell in London, in December 1973 Essex appeared in the stage version of Tommy at London's Rainbow Theatre.

In 1978, he appeared on Jeff Wayne's musical version of The War of the Worlds, as the Artilleryman. In the UK the two-record set remains a best-seller.

In the same year, Essex played the character Che in the original production of Tim Rice and Andrew Lloyd Webber's musical Evita, and his recording of the show's "Oh What a Circus" reached number three. As the best known of the principal performers, Essex actually received top billing, above Elaine Paige whose stardom seemingly arrived overnight with her casting in the show. His contract required him to remain with the show for just five and a half months, during which, unusually and as Essex had predicted, his understudy, Nigel Planer, was never required to perform.

Two years later, he starred in the motorcycle racing film Silver Dream Racer; and the soundtrack song "Silver Dream Machine" was a top five hit in the UK singles chart. Essex, a keen motorcyclist, waived his fee for the then-new 1980 electric-start Triumph Bonneville he had contracted to advertise on behalf of the struggling Triumph motorcycle workers' co-operative.

In 1981, he starred in Childe Byron, a play staged at the Young Vic theatre.

In 1985, he co-wrote and starred as Fletcher Christian in the West End musical Mutiny!, based on the novel Mutiny on the Bounty by Charles Nordhoff and James Norman Hall. The score produced two more hit singles, including "Tahiti", his tenth Top 10 success.

In February 2016, Essex performed in the West End production of Jeff Wayne's Musical Version of The War Of The Worlds at London's Dominion Theatre as the Voice of Humanity.

=== Later career ===
Essex continued to perform in all areas of show business. A 1988 sitcom, The River, achieved good ratings. In 1991, a music compilation entitled His Greatest Hits reached number 13; a 1993 album, Cover Shot, featuring a cover version of the Buzz Cason/Mac Gayden song "Everlasting Love", peaked at number 3. His autobiography, A Charmed Life, was published in 2002, and became a best-seller.

In the 1999 New Year Honours, Essex was appointed an Officer of the Order of the British Empire (OBE) "for charitable services, especially to Voluntary Service Overseas." He still tours the UK every year and releases albums through his website. Despite his long and successful British career, he remains largely unknown in the United States. "Rock On" reached number three in 1974 and was his only US Cash Box Top 40 hit single.

Essex, who comes from a family of Irish Travellers, played a kind-hearted nomad in one episode of ITV1's 1960s Yorkshire-based drama Heartbeat in 2000. He played a character called Johnny Lee. Essex told Jake Bowers of the BBC's Rokker Radio, a programme for Gypsies and Travellers, on 30 July 2006, that he has always been openly proud of his Traveller family history. He was Patron of Britain's National Gypsy Council, which works for equal rights, education, and services for Romany and Irish Travellers.

In 2005, he appeared as a guest vocalist on, and wrote songs for, Saint Etienne's album Tales from Turnpike House. Also that year, he appeared in the Channel 4 documentary Bring Back...The Christmas Number One.

Essex was due to join the cast of soap opera EastEnders, in early 2006, as new character Jack Edwards, but the role was expanded beyond the three weeks planned, and Essex was unable to commit the time. The role instead went to Nicky Henson.

A model and recording of Essex is featured in the museum of West Ham United Football Club. In the recording, he explains his reasons for supporting West Ham and his love of the team.

Essex spent six years as an ambassador for Voluntary Service Overseas, which earned him an OBE in 1999.

=== Recent years ===
Essex used to record and release records on his own record label, Lamplight. He has since changed the name of his company to Joseph Webster Ltd, named after his first grandchild. He tours regularly and continues to act, appearing in Boogie Nights 2, Footloose and Andrew Lloyd Webber's musical Aspects of Love. From September 2008 to the summer of 2009 he took his own musical, All the Fun of the Fair, on a tour of the United Kingdom. He followed this in the autumn with a sell-out solo tour of the UK, named the Secret Tour. Essex has released a DVD on his website of the last night of the tour, filmed in Bournemouth. He returned to London's West End with All the Fun of the Fair but with a different ending from that performed in the provinces.

In January 2011, it was announced that Essex had finally joined the cast of EastEnders as Eddie Moon, five years after he was initially supposed to appear in the show. His first on-screen appearance was on 3 June 2011. Eddie left the square on 6 October 2011. He then wrote the music score for the film Traveller (2013), in which he co-starred with his son who played the main role as a half-gypsy trying to find his identity.

== Personal life ==
On 20 September 2010, Essex married Welsh actress Susan Hallam-Wright (born 1973) his third wife, at St Cross Church, Talybont, near Bangor, North Wales. He first met her at the end of 2008 when she was auditioning for a role in All the Fun of the Fair. Essex had previously been married to Maureen Neal (in 1971) and Carlotta Christy (in 1997).

Essex has five children: two with his first wife, twins with his second wife and a fourth son with his third wife.

== Discography ==
- Rock On (1973)
- David Essex (1974)
- All the Fun of the Fair (1975)
- Out on the Street (1976)
- Gold & Ivory (1977)
- Imperial Wizard (1979)
- Hot Love (1980)
- Be-Bop the Future (1981)
- Stage-Struck (1982)
- The Whisper (1983)
- Winter’s Tale (1983)
- This One's for You (1984)
- Centre Stage (1986)
- Touching the Ghost (1989)
- Cover Shot (1993)
- Back to Back (1994)
- A Night at the Movies (1997)
- Here We Are All Together (1998)
- I Still Believe (1999)
- Thank You (2000)
- Wonderful (2001)
- Forever (2002)
- Sunset (2003)
- It's Gonna Be Alright (2004)
- Beautiful Day (2006)
- Happy Ever After (2007)
- Reflections (2013)

== Selected filmography ==
- Smashing Time (1967)
- Assault (1971)
- All Coppers Are... (1972)
- That'll Be the Day (1973)
- Stardust (1974)
- The Christmas Messenger (1975) (short film) (as the Storyteller)
- The Big Bus (1976)
- Silver Dream Racer (1980)
- The River (1988)
- Dick (1999)
- Heartbeat (2000)
- Tribe (2011)
- EastEnders (2011) (as Eddie Moon)
- Traveller (2013)
- The Guvnors (2014)

== See also ==
- List of 1970s one-hit wonders in the United States
