= Jeff Wayne's The War of the Worlds =

Jeff Wayne's The War of the Worlds may refer to:

== Music ==
- Jeff Wayne's Musical Version of The War of the Worlds, a 1978 concept album by Jeff Wayne, and its adaptations on stage

See also:

- Highlights from Jeff Wayne's Musical Version of The War of the Worlds, a 1981 compilation album by Jeff Wayne
- Jeff Wayne's Musical Version of The War of the Worlds – The New Generation, a 2012 reimagining of the 1978 album, also produced by Jeff Wayne

== Games ==
- Jeff Wayne's The War of the Worlds (1998 video game), a real-time strategy video game developed by Rage Software Limited for the PC
- Jeff Wayne's The War of the Worlds (1999 video game), a strategic vehicular combat third-person shooter video game developed by Pixelogic for the Sony PlayStation
- The War of the Worlds (1984 video game), a ZX Spectrum video game developed and released by CRL Group
