= Billboard year-end top singles of 1948 =

Ranking of recorded music

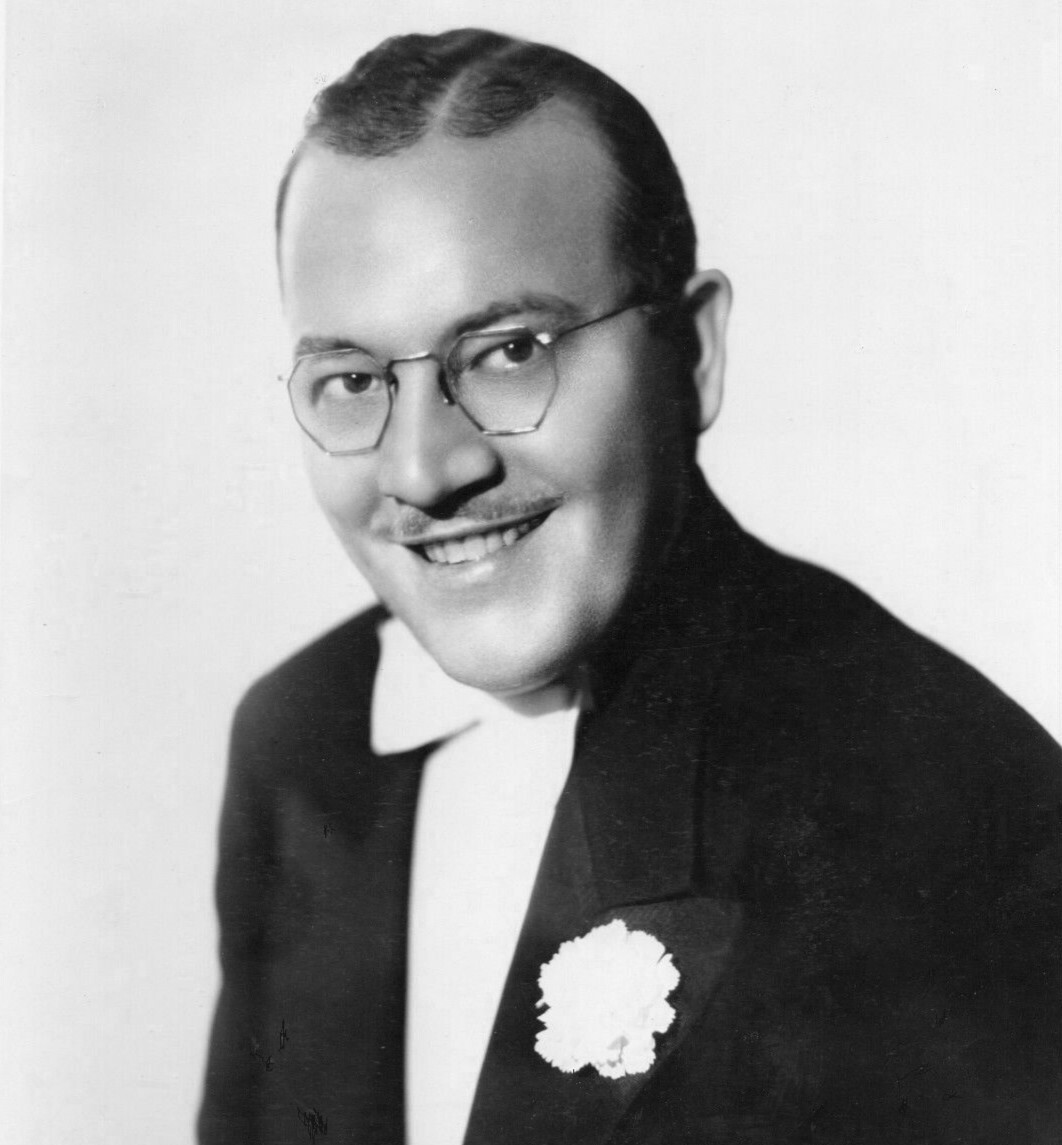
"Twelfth Street Rag" by Pee Wee Hunt was the number one song of 1948.

This is a list of Billboard magazine's top popular songs of 1948 according to retail sales.

No. (Rank)	Title	Artist(s)
1 (1)	"Twelfth Street Rag"	Pee Wee Hunt
2 (2)	"Mañana (Is Soon Enough for Me)"	Peggy Lee with Dave Barbour
3 (3)	"Now Is the Hour"	Bing Crosby with Ken Darby
4 (4)	"A Tree in the Meadow"	Margaret Whiting
5 (5)	"My Happiness"	Jon and Sondra Steele
6 (6)	"You Can't Be True, Dear"	Ken Griffin and Jerry Wayne
7 (7)	"Little White Lies"	Dick Haymes and Gordon Jenkins
8 (8)	"You Call Everybody Darlin'"	Al Trace with Bob Vincent
9 (9)	"My Happiness"	The Pied Pipers
10 (10)	"I'm Looking over a Four Leaf Clover"	Art Mooney
11 (11)	"It's Magic"	Doris Day
12 (12)	"Maybe You'll Be There"	Gordon Jenkins
13 (13)	"Ballerina"	Vaughn Monroe
14 (14)	"Nature Boy"	King Cole with Frank De Vol
15 (15)	"Woody Woodpecker"	Kay Kyser with Gloria Wood
16 (16)	"Love Somebody"	Doris Day and Buddy Clark with George Siravo
17 (17)	"Now Is the Hour"	Gracie Fields with Phil Green
18 (18)	"Beg Your Pardon"	Francis Craig
19 (19)	"You Can't Be True, Dear"	Ken Griffin
20 (20)	"Toolie Oolie Doolie"	The Andrews Sisters with Vic Schoen
21 (21)	"Buttons and Bows"	Dinah Shore
22 (22)	"Golden Earrings"	Peggy Lee with Dave Barbour
23 (23)	"Baby Face"	Art Mooney
23 (23)	"Too Fat Polka"	Arthur Godfrey with Archie Bleyer
24 (25)	"Because"	Perry Como with Russ Case
24 (25)	"My Happiness"	Ella Fitzgerald with the Song Spinners
25 (27)	"Serenade of the Bells"	Sammy Kaye
26 (28)	"Until"	Tommy Dorsey
27 (29)	"William Tell Overture"	Spike Jones
28 (30)	"Beg Your Pardon"	Frankie Carle
29 (31)	"St. Louis Blues March"	Tex Beneke
29 (31)	"Underneath the Arches"	Primo Scala
30 (33)	"On a Slow Boat to China"	Kay Kyser
30 (33)	"Woody Woodpecker"	The Sportsmen and Mel Blanc
31 (35)	"I'll Dance at Your Wedding"	Ray Noble and Buddy Clark
32 (36)	"The Dicky-Bird Song"	Freddy Martin
33 (37)	"I'm Looking Over a Four Leaf Clover"	Russ Morgan and Milt Herth
34 (38)	"How Soon"	Vaughn Monroe
35 (39)	"Serenade of the Bells"	Jo Stafford

== See also ==
- 1948 in music
- List of Billboard number-one singles of 1948
