= Jeff Wayne's Musical Version of The War of the Worlds – The New Generation =

Studio album by Jeff Wayne
- Released: 26 November 2012
- Recorded: June 2011–October 2012
- Genre: Progressive rock
- Length: 1:43:05
- Label: Sony Music Entertainment
- Producer: Jeff Wayne

Jeff Wayne chronology
Jeff Wayne's Musical Version of Spartacus (1992)	Jeff Wayne's Musical Version of The War of the Worlds – The New Generation (2012)

Singles from The New Generation
- 1. "Forever Autumn" Released: 5 November 2012; 2. "Eve of the War" Released: 4 February 2013

Professional ratings
Review scores
Source	Rating
Allmusic	2.5/5 stars

Jeff Wayne's Musical Version of The War of the Worlds – The New Generation is a 2012 concept album by Jeff Wayne and is a re-working of his 1978 concept album, retelling the story of the 1898 novel The War of the Worlds by H. G. Wells. As previously, the music format is predominantly progressive rock and string orchestra, but with synthesizers playing a more prominent role. The music is intermixed with re-voiced narration and leitmotifs to carry the story forward via rhyming melodic lyrics that express the feelings of the various characters. Due to the consistent popularity of the original album, Wayne decided to return to his score and re-create it for a new generation of audiences, as well as re-launch a live tour throughout the United Kingdom and Europe.

The album also replaces several guest singers from the original album. Liam Neeson replaced Richard Burton as the Journalist, Gary Barlow replaced Justin Hayward as the Sung Thoughts of the Journalist, Ricky Wilson replaced David Essex as the Artilleryman, Alex Clare replaced Chris Thompson as The Voice of Humanity, Maverick Sabre replaced Phil Lynott as Parson Nathaniel, and Joss Stone replaced Julie Covington as Beth. However, Jerry Wayne’s pre-recorded dialogue on “Epilogue, Pt. 2 (NASA)” were kept from the original.

The album received a mixed response. Praise was directed to its new compositions, dialogue, and the singers’ performances (mainly Barlow and Clare). Neeson’s performance as the Journalist was well-received, however some fans of the original were not impressed. Criticism was aimed at the overuse of synthesisers and Ricky Wilson’s performance as the Artilleryman.

== Background ==
=== Album ===
On 18 November 2011, Jeff Wayne announced at a press conference in London that there was to be a new release of his musical version of H. G. Wells 1898 novel, titled Jeff Wayne's Musical Version of The War of the Worlds – The New Generation. As the original musical version has remained one of the biggest selling albums of all time, Wayne explained that the idea was to return to it and explore H. G. Wells' characters in more detail, as well as develop the love story between the story's main character, George Herbert (the Journalist), and his fiancée Carrie. Wayne also explained that it would allow him to re-interpret his compositions with the new production techniques of today. The album was released on 26 November 2012 on both CD and Vinyl.

The New Generation features Academy Award-nominated actor Liam Neeson as the Narrator, formerly played by Richard Burton. Neeson revealed he was impressed and intimidated by the prospect of narrating and starring in Wayne's project. Gary Barlow (lead singer and songwriter of the British vocal pop group Take That) is the Sung Thoughts of the Journalist, formerly voiced by Justin Hayward. British singer-songwriter Alex Clare is the Voice of Humanity. Maverick Sabre, Irish-English singer-songwriter and rapper, appears on the album as Parson Nathaniel, and English soul singer, songwriter, and actress Joss Stone is his wife Beth. Kaiser Chiefs frontman Ricky Wilson took on the role of the Artilleryman. The Black Smoke Band once again includes Bassist Herbie Flowers and Guitarist Chris Spedding, both from the original 1978 album and its original 2006 tour.

Throughout mid to late 2012, tracks from The New Generation were released through various radio shows, which included all the guest artists' tracks and the premiere of "The Eve of the War". The new Liam Neeson hologram planned for the tour was demonstrated at the press conference with Neeson and Wayne and was also shown on The Alan Titchmarsh Show, on which an "Eve of the War" and "Forever Autumn" medley was performed with Wayne conducting. In January 2013, a music video was released for the song "Forever Autumn", performed by Gary Barlow, however, Barlow does not appear in the video. It stars Jeff Wayne's daughter Anna-Marie Wayne as Carrie and Neeson as the Journalist and looks further into the story of Carrie, rather than from the Journalist's point of view as heard on the album. It features both all-new footage as well as footage seen on the CGI 100-foot wide screen used during the live shows. The New Generation album was produced by Jeff Wayne and Damian Collier and was recorded at Olliewood Recording Studios in Hertfordshire by Gaetan Schurrer and Tom Woodstock.

== Critical reception ==
The New Generation album received mixed reactions from music critics and lifelong fans of Wayne's original album, with many praising Liam Neeson's performance as The Journalist, though some fans of the original were not impressed, comparing his performance to that of Richard Burton's. People praised its new compositions, dialogue and re-arrangement of Wayne's original music, claiming it to be "less dated", but criticism was aimed at the overuse of the synthesizer elements, as well as some of the singers' performances, mainly by some fans of the original album. Gary Barlow's performance of "Forever Autumn" received praise, but many criticised Ricky Wilson's performance as The Artilleryman, mainly for his delivery of the spoken dialogue. Maverick Sabre and Joss Stone's performances as Parson Nathaniel and Beth received a more lukewarm response whereas Alex Clare's rendition of "Thunder Child" received praise, with many people claiming that his take on the song was the best track on the album.

Since the album was released, Wayne has tried to be more faithful to his original version by toning down the synthesizer elements and re-arranging the string orchestra when he performed the album live in 2014 and 2018, but keeping his new compositions and Liam Neeson's narration entirely unchanged.

== Track listing ==
All dialogue was written by Doreen and Jeff Wayne's father Jerry Wayne, based upon H. G. Wells's original text.

All tracks are written by Jeff Wayne except where noted.

Disc One
No.	Title	Performer(s)	Length
1.	"The Eve of the War"	Liam Neeson and Gary Barlow	10:13
2.	"Horsell Common and The Heat Ray"	Liam Neeson	12:14
3.	"The Artilleryman and The Fighting Machine"	Liam Neeson and Ricky Wilson	12:05
4.	"Forever Autumn" (Lyrics by Gary Osborne and Paul Vigrass)	Liam Neeson and Gary Barlow	7:54
5.	"Thunder Child" (Lyrics by Gary Osborne)	Liam Neeson and Alex Clare	6:13
Total length:			48:39

Disc Two
No.	Title	Performer(s)	Length
1.	"The Red Weed (Part 1)"	Liam Neeson	6:57
2.	"The Spirit of Man" (Lyrics by Gary Osborne)	Liam Neeson, Maverick Sabre, and Joss Stone	12:06
3.	"The Red Weed (Part 2)"	Liam Neeson and Maverick Sabre	5:19
4.	"The Artilleryman Returns"	Liam Neeson and Ricky Wilson	3:20
5.	"Brave New World" (Lyrics by Gary Osborne)	Liam Neeson and Ricky Wilson	12:14
6.	"Dead London (Part 1)"	Liam Neeson	5:26
7.	"Dead London (Part 2)"	Liam Neeson and Gary Barlow	3:47
8.	"Epilogue (Part 1)"	Liam Neeson	3:21
9.	"Epilogue (Part 2) (NASA)"	Jerry Wayne and Lewis MacLeod	1:57
Total length:			54:27

== Cast ==
=== Performers ===
Character	Album 2012	The New Generation: Alive on Stage 2012–2013	The Final Arena 2014	West End 2016	40th Anniversary 2018	Life Begins Again 2022	The Spirit of Man 2025
The Journalist	Liam Neeson	Liam Neeson	Liam Neeson	Liam Neeson	Liam Neeson	Liam Neeson	Liam Neeson
The Sung Thoughts of the Journalist	Gary Barlow	Marti Pellow	Brian McFadden	Michael Praed	Newton Faulkner	Justin Hayward	Charlie Simpson
The Artilleryman	Ricky Wilson	Ricky Wilson	Shayne Ward	Daniel Bedingfield Simon Shorten	Adam Garcia	Kevin Clifton	Rou Reynolds
Parson Nathaniel	Maverick Sabre	Jason Donovan	Jason Donovan	Jimmy Nail	Jason Donovan	Duncan James	Max George Jonathan Vickers (Newcastle)
Beth	Joss Stone	Kerry Ellis	Carrie Hope Fletcher	Heidi Range	Carrie Hope Fletcher	Claire Richards	Maisie Smith
The Voice of Humanity	Alex Clare	Will Stapleton	Joseph Whelan	David Essex	Nathan James	Nathan James	Nathan James
The Voice of NASA	Jerry Wayne	Jerry Wayne	Jerry Wayne	Jerry Wayne	Jerry Wayne	Jerry Wayne	Jerry Wayne
The Voice of the Martians	Lewis MacLeod	Lewis MacLeod	Lewis MacLeod	Lewis MacLeod	Lewis MacLeod	Lewis MacLeod	Lewis MacLeod
Carrie: The Journalist's Fiancée	—	Anna-Marie Wayne	Anna-Marie Wayne	Madalena Alberto	Anna-Marie Wayne	Anna-Marie Wayne	Anna-Marie Wayne
Carrie's Father	—	—	Nigel Barber	—	Nigel Barber	—	Nigel Barber
William Rowland, NASA Controller, Newspaper Boy, Male Understudy	—	Michael Falzon	Jonathan Vickers	—	Jonathan Vickers	Jonathan Vickers	Jonathan Vickers Roseanna Harris (Newcastle)
Vera May, Newspaper Girl, Female Understudy	—	Lily Osborne	Lily Osborne	Lily Osborne	Lily Osborne	Stephanie Aves	Roseanna Harris
H.G. Wells age 33, 53, and 79	—	—	Callum O'Neill	—	—	Callum O'Neill	Callum O'Neill

=== The Black Smoke Band ===
==== Album ====
- Jeff Wayne – composer, arranger, keyboards, synthesizers
- Chris Spedding – electric guitar, acoustic guitar
- Herbie Flowers – bass guitar
- Ken Freeman – keyboards, synthesisers
- George Fenton – santoor, zither, tar
- Gordy Marshall – drums
- Ray Cooper – percussion
- Jo Partridge – guitars (The Heat Ray), vocals ('Ulla's)
- Tom Woodstock – guitars (The Heat Ray), additional keyboards, backing vocals, dulcimer
- Laurie Wisefield – mandolin, guitars, dulcimer
- Gaetan Schurrer – programming, keyboards, additional drum production

==== Tours ====
- Jeff Wayne – composer, conductor
- Chris Spedding – electric guitar, acoustic guitar
- Herbie Flowers – bass guitar
- Tom Woodstock – guitars, keyboards, backing vocals
- Laurie Wisefield – guitars, mandolin, autoharp, tar
- Huw Davies – guitars, mandolin, autoharp, tar, voice box (Farewell Thunder Child tour)
- Accy Yeats – drums
- Julia Thornton – percussion, harp, keyboards
- Olivia Jageurs – percussion, harp (Farewell Thunder Child tour)
- Steve Turner – keyboards
- Neil Angilley – keyboards
- Kennedy Aitchison – keyboards
- Thomas Gandey – keyboards (Farewell Thunder Child tour)
- Paul Bond – guitar, keyboards, backing vocals
- Pete Hunt – bass

=== String Orchestra ===
==== Album ====
- Littlechap Strings

==== Tours ====
- ULLAdubULLA

== Charts ==
Chart (2012–2013)	Peak position
Irish Albums (IRMA)	57
Scottish Albums (OCC)	21
UK Albums (OCC)	13

== Certifications ==
Region	Certification	Certified units/sales
United Kingdom (BPI)	Gold	100,000^{*}
^{*} Sales figures based on certification alone.
