= The Eagle and the Hawk =

The Eagle and the Hawk may refer to:

- The Eagle and the Hawk (1933 film), a war film starring Fredric March and Cary Grant
- The Eagle and the Hawk (1950 film), a western starring John Payne and Rhonda Fleming
- "The Eagle and the Hawk", a John Denver song released in 1971 on the album Aerie for an ABC documentary program of the same title
- "The Eagle and the Hawk", a song from the 1992 concept album Jeff Wayne's Musical Version of Spartacus
