= Peter Goodfellow =

Peter Goodfellow may refer to:

- Peter Goodfellow (geneticist) (born 1951), British geneticist
- Peter Goodfellow (politician), New Zealand businessman and politician
- Peter Goodfellow (artist) (1950–2022), British artist
