= Highlights from Jeff Wayne's Musical Version of The War of the Worlds =

Compilation album by Jeff Wayne
- Released: 16 October 1981
- Recorded: May 1976–July 1977
- Length: 47:42
- Label: Columbia Records
- Producer: Jeff Wayne

Jeff Wayne chronology
Jeff Wayne's Musical Version of The War of the Worlds (1978)	Highlights from Jeff Wayne's Musical Version of The War of the Worlds (1981)	Jeff Wayne's Musical Version of Spartacus (1992)

Alternative Cover
- 2007 Album Cover

Highlights from Jeff Wayne's Musical Version of The War of the Worlds is a 1981 compilation album by Jeff Wayne, highlights of the 1978 concept album, retelling the story of the 1898 novel The War of the Worlds by H. G. Wells. It was released by Columbia Records.

== About the album ==
In order to cater to casual consumers who liked the music of Jeff Wayne's Musical Version of The War of the Worlds but did not want to sit through all the dialogue, Columbia Records issued a single-disc abridged version. It focused on the album's songs, but did not shy away from the longer musical passages. The album scrambles the original track list, reducing the plot's coherence.

When the record was re-issued in October 2000, two bonus tracks were added: the 1989 Ben Liebrand remix of the single version of "The Eve of the War" and the 1996 remix of "Forever Autumn".

The record was re-issued on 4 June 2007 with a revised cover, new stereo mixes of the original nine tracks and the bonus track "The Spirit Of Man (2007 Mix)".

== Track listing ==
All tracks written by Jeff Wayne except as noted.

=== Original compilation ===
1. "The Eve of the War" – 5:13
2. "Horsell Common and the Heat Ray" – 4:45
3. "Forever Autumn" (Wayne, Vigrass, Osborne) – 4:31
4. "The Fighting Machine" – 4:25
5. "Thunderchild" (Wayne, Osborne) – 5:09
6. "The Red Weed" – 6:06
7. "The Spirit of Man" (Wayne, Osborne) – 6:44
8. "Dead London" – 5:25
9. "Brave New World" (Wayne, Osborne) – 5:23

=== 2000 re-issue bonus tracks ===
- The Eve of the War (single version, 1989 remix)
- Forever Autumn (1996 remix)

=== 2007 re-issue bonus track ===
- The Spirit Of Man (2007 Mix)

== People involved ==
- Jeff Wayne – keyboards

=== Additional musicians ===
- Richard Burton – spoken words
- David Essex – spoken words and vocals ("Brave New World")
- Phil Lynott – spoken words and vocals ("The Spirit of Man")
- Julie Covington – spoken words and vocals ("The Spirit of Man")
- Justin Hayward – vocals ("Forever Autumn", "The Eve of the War")
- Chris Thompson – vocals ("Thunder Child")
- Ken Freeman – keyboards
- Chris Spedding – guitar
- Jo Partridge – guitar
- George Fenton – santur, zither, tar
- Herbie Flowers – bass guitar
- Barry Morgan – drums
- Barry da Souza, Roy Jones, Ray Cooper – percussion
- Paul Vigrass, Gary Osborne, Billy Lawrie – backing vocals

== Charts ==
Chart (1981)	Peak position
Australian Albums (Kent Music Report)	72

Chart (1996)	Peak position
Scottish Albums (OCC)	99
UK Albums (OCC)	64

Chart (2007)	Peak position
UK Albums (OCC)	86

== Certifications ==
Region	Certification	Certified units/sales
United Kingdom (BPI) 2007 release	Gold	100,000^{^}
^{^} Shipments figures based on certification alone.
