= Forever Autumn (song) =

Single by Jeff Wayne, Richard Burton and Justin Hayward

from the album Jeff Wayne's Musical Version of The War of the Worlds
- Released: 2 June 1978
- Recorded: May 1976
- Length: 7:43
- Songwriters: Jeff Wayne, Gary Osborne and Paul Vigrass

Jeff Wayne singles chronology
"The Eve of The War" (1978)	"Forever Autumn" (1978)	"Jubilation" (1980)

"Forever Autumn" is a song written by Jeff Wayne, Gary Osborne and Paul Vigrass, and sung by Justin Hayward. The original melody was written by Wayne in 1969 as a jingle for a Lego commercial. Vigrass and Osborne, the performers of the original jingle, added lyrics to the song and recorded it for inclusion on their 1972 album Queues. Their interpretation was also released as a single and gained moderate commercial success in Japan, selling more than 100,000 copies and becoming a top-20 hit on the country's record chart.

The best-known version is the recording by Justin Hayward from the album Jeff Wayne's Musical Version of The War of the Worlds. Wayne wanted to include a love song on the album that sounded like "Forever Autumn", and he decided that the best course of action was to simply use the original song. Wayne chose Hayward, of The Moody Blues, to sing it saying that he "wanted that voice from 'Nights in White Satin'". Hayward remembers being contacted: "Jeff Wayne called me up and asked me if I was the guy who sang "Nights In White Satin" and I told him 'Yes, I might have done that one!' He had the music and the lyrics and I went into the studio and recorded it in a day." It was recorded at London's Advision Studios in 1976.

The song reached #5 on the UK Singles Chart in August 1978. The single version was released on the compilation album Highlights from Jeff Wayne's Musical Version of The War of the Worlds.

A new version was released in late 2012, sung by Gary Barlow for the new album Jeff Wayne's Musical Version of The War of the Worlds – The New Generation.

== Background ==
Hayward remembers the experience of recording the song: "I went down to this little studio called AdVision on Oxford street, I'd kinda learned the song anyway before I got there, and Jeff had got all the atmosphere. He was an atmosphere kind of person, you know? Lights right, scarf over the lamp and all that sort of stuff, he had to have the mood right. He'd done everything, except the voices, so I did the voices and the backing vocals as well. Then he explained everything to me about the project. The next few weeks, I got more involved with the project, I played the guitar, and I did some other songs on it, and I was generally sort of hanging around. I took a fee - which was a big mistake, big mistake (laughs), because like I said, I'd done a lot of those things before and nothing had ever happened, and so I got used to saying, 'Yeah, great. Of course you'd like my voice on it. I'll have the money upfront.' Which is what I did, because I couldn't work out who was going to buy it. I knew the music was great, but I thought, 'Who the hell's going to buy it? Who's going to try and sell this and who's going to buy it?' In '76 I recorded it, and in '78 it came out, and actually it was bought by a lot of young kids - nine, ten year old kids - first of all. And then suddenly it appeared in the charts, and then the record company called and they said, 'Would you go on Top Of The Pops? Your song is the hit from it.' So it was wonderful, really, I went all over the world with it, it was a hit all over the world."

== Other recordings ==
- Vigrass and Osborne performed it on their 1972 album, Queues. This version also appeared as a single on the b-side of "Men Of Learning".
- Hayward performed it on the 1978 album Jeff Wayne's Musical Version of The War of the Worlds. A slightly different mix (notably excluding the narration from the album) was released as a single. The latter version was included in the Moody Blues' box set Time Traveller. A version also appears on the 1989 album Classic Blue, a collaboration with Mike Batt and the London Philharmonic Orchestra. Although sometimes falsely credited as being an original single by the Moody Blues itself, Hayward has performed the song live with that group.
- Acker Bilk, on the 1980 album, Mellow Music.
- Paul Brett, on the 1980 album, Romantic Guitar. This version also appeared as a single.

== Chart positions ==
Vigrass and Osborne
Chart (1972)	Peak position
Japanese Oricon International Singles Chart	2

Justin Hayward
Chart (1978)	Peak position
Australian Singles (Kent Music Report)	33
Canada Top Singles (RPM)	73
Ireland (IRMA)	3
Netherlands (Single Top 100)	35
New Zealand (Recorded Music NZ)	33
UK Singles (Official Charts)	5
US Adult Contemporary (Billboard)	20
US Billboard Hot 100	47
U.S. Cashbox Top 100	34

== Certifications ==
Certifications and sales for Wayne version
Region	Certification	Certified units/sales
United Kingdom (BPI)	Silver	200,000^{‡}
^{‡} Sales+streaming figures based on certification alone.

Certifications and sales for Hayward version
Region	Certification	Certified units/sales
United Kingdom (BPI)	Silver	250,000^{^}
^{^} Shipments figures based on certification alone.
