= Kenneth Freeman =

Ken Freeman may refer to:

- Ken Freeman (astronomer) (born 1940), Australian astronomer and astrophysicist
- Ken Freeman (composer) (born 1947), English composer and session musician
- Kenneth W. Freeman, American business executive and academic dean
- Kenneth John Freeman, the perpetrator of the abuse of Kylie Freeman
