= Jeff Wayne's Musical Version of Spartacus =

Studio album by Jeff Wayne
- Released: 21 September 1992
- Genre: Progressive rock
- Label: Columbia
- Producer: Jeff Wayne

Jeff Wayne chronology
Highlights from Jeff Wayne's Musical Version of The War of the Worlds (1981)	Jeff Wayne's Musical Version of Spartacus (1992)	Jeff Wayne's Musical Version of The War of the Worlds – The New Generation (2012)

Jeff Wayne's Musical Version of Spartacus is a 1992 concept album produced and composed by Jeff Wayne with Lyrics by Gary Osborne, telling the story of Roman gladiator, Spartacus.

It starred Anthony Hopkins, Catherine Zeta-Jones (in her first recording role), Fish, Ladysmith Black Mambazo, and Scots singer Alan King as Spartacus.

It was also the first Jeff Wayne release that is not related to his musical version of The War of the Worlds. Based on a story outline by Jeff Wayne, the script was written by writer Brian Sibley and playwright John Spurling with Sibley responsible for the script of 'Animal & Man', 'The Eagle & the Hawk' and 'The Appian Way' and Spurling largely responsible for the script of 'The Parting of the Ways' and 'The Last Battle'. Also starring in the album is Chris Thompson and Jo Partridge, who appeared in The War of the Worlds. Originally, Thompson had a singing role, but his song was dropped from the final version of the album. It is rumoured that Thompson possesses the only copy of his song. The lead vocals representing Spartacus himself were performed by Scottish vocalist, Alan King of Walk On Fire fame.

The artists for the album were Gino D'Achille, Christos Achilleos and Andrew Wheatcroft, with art directed by Richard Evans.

== Track listing ==
Disc 1: "Animal & Man"

1. Destiny - Jeff Wayne/Gary Osborne
2. Animal & Man (Part 1) - Jeff Wayne
3. Animal & Man (Part 2) - Jeff Wayne
4. For All Time - Jeff Wayne/James Cassidy
5. Whispers - Jeff Wayne/Gary Osborne
6. The Eagle & The Hawk - Jeff Wayne/Gary Osborne

Disc 2: "The Parting Of The Ways"

1. Going Home - Jeff Wayne/Gary Osborne
2. The Parting Of The Ways - Jeff Wayne/Gary Osborne
3. We Carry On - Jeff Wayne/Gary Osborne
4. Trust Me - Jeff Wayne/Gary Osborne
5. Two Souls With A Single Dream - Jeff Wayne/Gary Osborne
6. The Last Battle / The Eagle & The Hawk - Jeff Wayne/Gary Osborne
7. The Appian Way - Jeff Wayne
8. Epilogue (Part 1) - Jeff Wayne
9. Epilogue (Part 2) - Jeff Wayne

Total Running Time: Approx 111 Minutes

== Cast ==
- Anthony Hopkins - Marcus Crassus
- Catherine Zeta-Jones - Palene
- Alan King - Spartacus
- Derek William Dick (Fish) - Crixus
- Ladysmith Black Mambazo - Spartacus' Army
- Chris Thompson - Oenomaus
- Jimmy Helms - Isauricus the Sicilian Pirate
- Bill Fredericks - Lead Vocals (Going Home)
- Lorna Bannon and Carol Kenyan - Slave Girls

== Charts ==
Chart (1992)	Peak position
UK Albums (OCC)	36
