= Jeff Wayne =

American composer and musician (born 1943)

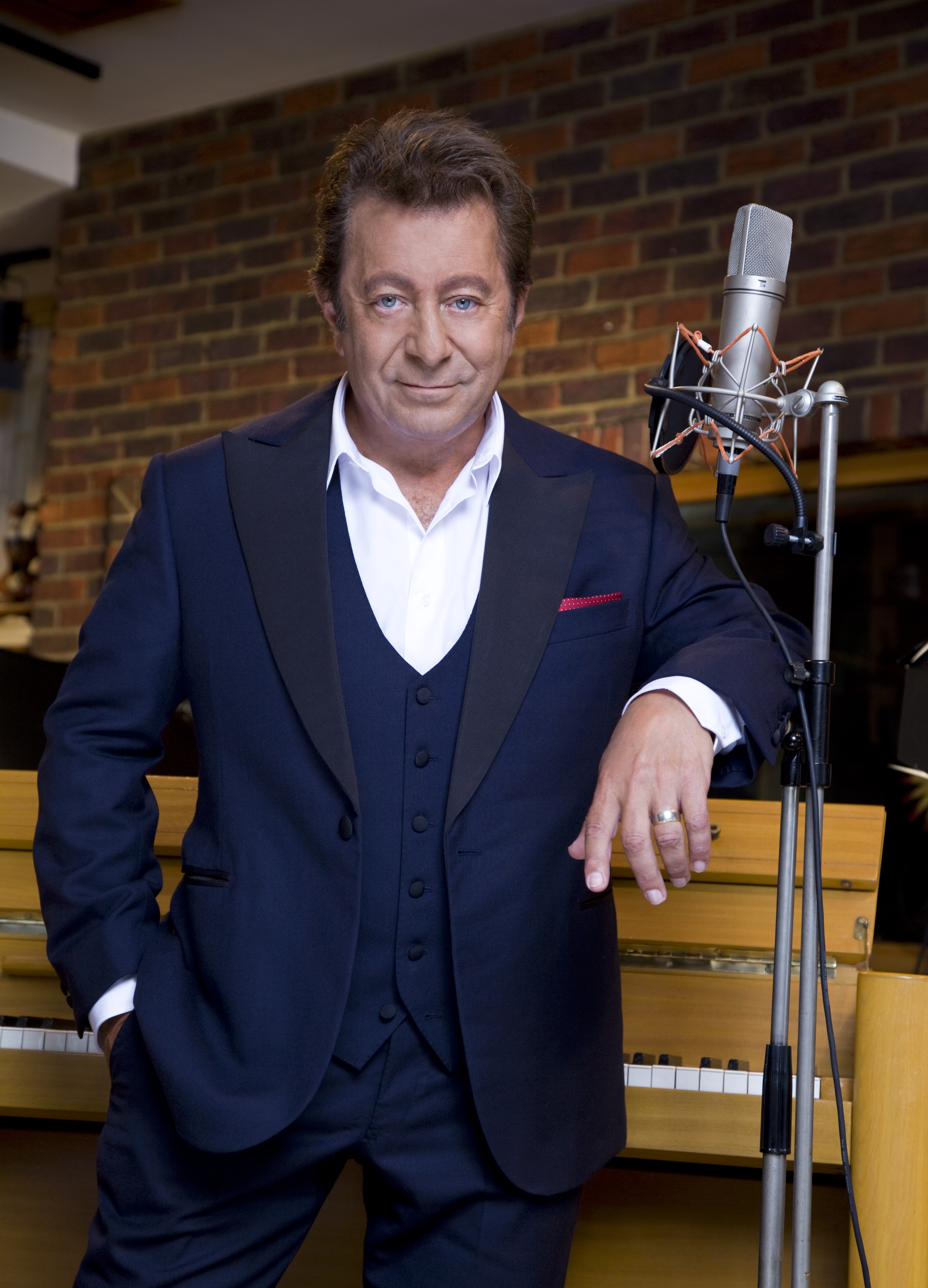
- Wayne in 2014

Background information
- Born: Jeffry Wayne; July 1, 1943 (age 82); New York City, U.S.
- Education: Los Angeles Valley College
- Genres: Progressive rock; rock; pop
- Occupations: Composer; musician
- Instruments: Piano; keyboards; electronic instruments
- Years active: 1966–present
- Label: Sony
- Website: thewaroftheworlds.com

Jeffry Wayne (born July 1, 1943) is an American-British composer, musician and lyricist. In 1978, he released Jeff Wayne's Musical Version of The War of the Worlds, his musical adaptation of H. G. Wells' science-fiction novel The War of the Worlds. Wayne wrote approximately 3,000 advertising jingles in the 1970s which appeared on television in the United Kingdom, including a Gordon's Gin commercial which was covered by the Human League. Wayne also composed numerous television themes, including Good Morning Britain (TV-am), ITV's The Big Match and World of Sport, and the BBC's Sixty Minutes.

Wayne wrote feature film and documentary film scores and was musical director for various artists. Wayne published a book called The Book of Tennis and created, produced and scored eight thirty-minute episodes of The Book of Tennis Chronicles that was distributed by Fox Sports in approximately twenty countries, and was broadcast in the US on the Tennis Channel between 2005 and 2008.

== Early life ==
Jeff Wayne was born on July 1, 1943, in Forest Hills, Queens, New York, United States. His father, Jerry Wayne (né Jerome Marvin Krauth; 1916–1996), was an American actor, singer, and theatre producer. Jeff Wayne spent four years of his childhood in the UK when his father played romantic gambler Sky Masterson in the original West End musical production of Guys and Dolls.

After they returned to New York, Wayne graduated from Stephen Halsey Jr. High and attended Forest Hills High School for one year, and played for its tennis team, before moving to California. Wayne graduated from Grant High School, then from Los Angeles Valley College with a journalism degree. He played keyboards in local bands and coached tennis to support himself. After completing his journalism degree he switched to music, playing keyboards briefly with the Sandpipers.

== Musical career ==
In 1966, Wayne composed the score for his father's West End musical Two Cities based on Charles Dickens' A Tale of Two Cities which ran at London's Palace Theatre. The musical was successful, winning for Edward Woodward the Evening Standard Award for Best Male Performance in a Musical for 1968–69. Returning to the UK, Wayne became a record producer. In 1970 or 1971, he made a single, "The Bittermen Theme", featuring Chris Spedding on guitar, a version of which was used in a television commercial for Ansells bitter. Wayne helped produce David Essex's album Rock On. Essex was subsequently a voice actor in The War of the Worlds, playing the part of the Artilleryman. Wayne also provided the score for the 1977 action thriller Golden Rendezvous, which starred Richard Harris.

=== The War of The Worlds ===
In 1978, Jeff Wayne's Musical Version of The War of the Worlds was released, achieving international success. Wayne's two-disc composition sold millions of copies around the world and was the 40th best selling album of all time in the UK by 2009. It included worldwide hit singles "The Eve of The War" and "Forever Autumn", both sung by Justin Hayward, and included narration throughout by Richard Burton. It won two Ivor Novello Awards and The Best Recording in Science Fiction and Fantasy (the judges included Steven Spielberg, George Lucas, and Alfred Hitchcock). "The Eve of The War" was used by the offshore radio station Radio Delmare as its theme tune. The album was re-released on Super Audio CD in 2005; five tracks were remastered and placed on the second disc (mostly without Wayne's input). A Limited Edition 7-disc Collector's Edition CD and DVD box set, which included remixes, outtakes, and documentary, was issued in 2005.

Wayne announced a new Musical Version of The War of The Worlds album to be released in June 2012 titled Jeff Wayne's Musical Version of The War of the Worlds – The New Generation. The album was released in November 2012.

=== Later work ===
After The War of the Worlds, Wayne continued to compose and produce music, such as the music for the 1979 television film The Knowledge and the Who's movie McVicar released in 1980. Wayne composed music for the Fry's Turkish Delight advertisement in 1981, the theme for Good Morning Britain in 1982 on TV-am, and music for the 1984 album Beyond the Planets, Kevin Peek and Rick Wakeman's progressive rock recording of Holst's orchestral suite.

In 1992 Wayne released Jeff Wayne's Musical Version of Spartacus, his first major release since The War of the Worlds. Its cast included Anthony Hopkins, Catherine Zeta-Jones, Ladysmith Black Mambazo, and Marillion's Fish. It featured a libretto by Gary Osborne and a story combining powerful themes of oppression, desperation, love and death.

Wayne was involved in producing Jeff Wayne's The War of the Worlds in 1998, a computer game that included 45 minutes of music from his Musical Version of The War of the Worlds, re-scored and remixed in an electronica style with techno beats. The game also featured computer-generated visualisations of numerous scenes from the album – an idea Wayne would later revisit. In 1999, a related game, also titled Jeff Wayne's The War of the Worlds, was released for the Sony PlayStation.

The War of the Worlds was re-released in the summer of 2005. It spent ten consecutive weeks in the Top 10 of the UK Album charts. Including this re-release, the album achieved sales to 3 million in the UK, and approximately 13 million worldwide. Also in 2005, it was announced that the musical would be going on a UK tour in April 2006. The live show was taken to Australia and New Zealand and returned the UK during December 2007. The show, produced by Damian Collier, used a ten-piece band and a 48-piece string orchestra, voice actors, screen-projected images and animatronics. Universal Pictures released a DVD of the show, filmed at Wembley Arena using 23 high definition cameras and directed by David Mallet. In 2022, the UK Arena tour relaunched following the Covid-19 outbreak. The tour premiered at Nottingham's Motorpoint Arena on March 23 and once again starred Justin Hayward as the sung thoughts of The Journalist. Other notable cast for this tour include Claire Richards as Beth, Duncan James as Parson Nathaniel and Kevin Clifton as the Artilleryman. The show also featured a holographic version of Liam Neeson as the Journalist.

Wayne's first television series, The Book of Tennis Chronicles, was broadcast worldwide in 2005 and distributed by Fox Sports. It features well-known tennis players and events, set against events in world history from 1877 to 2005. Wayne created and produced eight half-hour episodes and scored its music. The series' executive producer was Damian Collier.

== Tennis ==
A keen player and follower of tennis throughout his life, Wayne remains involved with the sport; he has won the British National Indoor Veterans singles and doubles titles, and the National Clay Court doubles. In 1992 he partnered former Great Britain No. 1 and Davis Cup captain Roger Taylor at the European Veteran Championships. In 1999, Wayne represented Great Britain in the Austria Cup in Spain, and achieved an ITF world ranking in his age group. In 2008 Wayne was elected into the International Lawn Tennis Club of Great Britain. Wayne has also played in numerous fundraising pro-am tournaments, including for Muscular dystrophy and Save the Children.

== Discography ==
=== Albums ===
List of albums, with selected chart positions
Title	Album details	Peak chart positions									Certification
Title	Album details	UK	AUS	CAN	GER	IRE	NED	NZ	SWE	US	Certification
Jeff Wayne's Musical Version of The War of the Worlds	Released: June 9, 1978; Format: 2× LP, 2× cassette; Label: CBS	5	1	76	10	20	2	2	16	94	BPI: 9× Platinum; ARIA: 10× Platinum; BVMI: Gold; MC: Platinum; NVPI: Platinum; RMNZ: 13× Platinum
Highlights from Jeff Wayne's Musical Version of The War of the Worlds	Released: October 16, 1981; Format: LP, cassette; Label: CBS	64	72	—	—	—	—	—	—	—	BPI: Gold
Jeff Wayne's Musical Version of Spartacus	Released: September 21, 1992; Format: 2×CD, 2× cassette; Label: Columbia	36	—	—	—	—	—	—	—	—	
Jeff Wayne's Musical Version of The War of the Worlds – The New Generation	Released: November 26, 2012; Format: 2× LP, 2× CD, digital; Label: Sony Music Entertainment	13	—	—	—	57	—	—	—	—	BPI: Gold

=== Extended plays ===
- Pianos, Strings and Some Other Things (2018)

=== Singles ===
- "The Bittermen Theme"/"Remember Joe" (Hollick & Taylor HT/SP 1312, 1970 or 1971)
- "Jubilation" (1980 television theme for The Big Match)
- "Matador" (1982 television theme for the World Cup)
