= Phoenix Film & Television Productions =

Phoenix Film & Television Productions Ltd. is a Production and Post-Production company based in London at Three Mills Film Studios, founded in July 1998. The company produces films for the Corporate and Broadcast video markets.

Phoenix Film & Television Productions offers a range of different services including Production for Television and Corporate films, DVD Production, CGI Graphics, Second Life consultancy and Audio production services.

Some of Phoenix's recent projects include the DVD documentary Jeff Wayne's Musical Version of The War of the Worlds for Sony BMG, Pink Floyd's P.U.L.S.E DVD for EMI, the DVD Extra "The Making of The Quatermass Experiment" for 2 Entertain, Marcus Brigstocke stand-up comedy DVD Planet Corduroy for Sony BMG, world music showcase "Soundcheck At Momo's" for The Africa Channel, and a number of Doctor Who DVD extras and documentaries for the BBC.

== Television productions ==
Soundcheck at Momo's - Africa Channel (2008)
4 Play: Gogol Bordello - Channel 4 (2008)

== Music productions ==
Tinarawen - Live at Shepherds Bush Empire (2008)
Springbock Nude Girls - Live at the Astoria DVD - Sony BMG (2007)
"We love Grease" DVD - Gut Records (2007)
P.U.L.S.E. DVD - Pink Floyd (2005)

== DVD productions ==
Doctor Who: The Key To Time (Complete Box Set) (2008)
Planet Corduroy: Marcus Brigstocke live stand-up (2007)
The Making of ‘The Young Ones’ (2007)
Alternative Rebellion (2007)
The Guest Stars of ‘The Young Ones’ (2007)
Double Trouble (2007)
Hammer Horror (2007)
Philip Madoc: A Villain for All Seasons (2007)
Rogue Time Lords (2007)
Stones Free (2007)
Weird Science (2007)
Another Girl, Another Planet (2006)
Wanda Ventham Remembers 'The Lotus Eaters' (2006)
A Question of Faith (2006)
The Famous Simon Templar (2006)
The Girls of the Saint (2006)
The Story of ST 1 (2006)
Deconstructing Jeff Wayne's musical version of The War of the Worlds (2005)
New World Rising: The Making of Survivors Series 3 (2005)
Bring Something Back: The Making of 'The Quatermass Experiment' (2005)
