= Jerry Wayne =

American singer, composer, producer, and actor (1916–1996)

Jerry Wayne (born Jerome Marvin Krauth; July 24, 1916 – September 15, 1996) was an American singer, composer, producer, and actor. He was born in Buffalo, New York.

Jerry Wayne was an actor, singer, and theatre producer. He is known for his contribution to music as a vocalist. In 1948, Wayne provided vocals to Ken Griffin's solo organ recording of "You Can't Be True, Dear". The recording was released by Rondo Records as catalog number 228 and quickly gained popularity, reaching the top of the Billboard Best Seller chart on April 2, 1948, where it stayed for seven weeks. It was also the sixth most popular song on the Billboard Top 100 for the year 1948.

He played romantic gambler Sky Masterson in the original West End musical production of Guys and Dolls in London. As a film actor, Wayne is known for his role as Bobby Denver in the 1955 film As Long as They're Happy.

In the summer of 1948, Wayne hosted The Jerry Wayne Show on CBS Radio.

Wayne was the father of Jeff Wayne, who gained fame for his 1978 recording Jeff Wayne's Musical Version of The War of the Worlds. This concept was originally Jerry's idea, and also he collaborated with his son on the 1992 musical album Jeff Wayne's Musical Version Of Spartacus.

Jerry Wayne died on September 15, 1996, in Hertfordshire, England, aged 80.
