= Jeff Wayne's The War of the Worlds (1998 video game) =

- European cover art
- Developer: Rage Software
- Publisher: GT Interactive
- Producer: Steven B. Sargent
- Programmer: David Johnston
- Writer: Doreen Wayne
- Composers: Jeff Wayne; Max Mondo; Stephen Murphy
- Platform: Windows
- Release: EU: 10 February 1998; NA: 22 December 1998
- Genre: Real-time strategy
- Mode: Single-player

Jeff Wayne's The War of the Worlds is a real-time strategy video game developed by Rage Software Limited and released for Windows-based PCs in 1998. It is based on Jeff Wayne's Musical Version of The War of the Worlds — which is itself based on H. G. Wells' 1898 novel The War of the Worlds.

In 1999, another game of the same name was released for the Sony PlayStation. The 1999 game reuses the 1998 game's graphics and music, but features entirely different gameplay: it is a third-person shooter with a focus on vehicular combat.

The game includes remixed instrumental versions of some songs from the 1978 album. It also re-uses Richard Burton's voice recordings during the Human campaign intro and ending scenes.

== Gameplay ==
The player can choose to play as either the defending humans or the invading Martians. It was unusual at the time, as instead of having pre-set missions, battles only take place when one sides' forces are sent to a sector occupied by the other. Unit building and the inter-sector movement of forces are done between battles, similar to North & South or the later Total War franchise.

The game is set in Great Britain starting in 1898, and can last for years. The map of Britain (the "War map") is divided into approximately 30 sectors. On the war map, the player can move units from sector to sector, invade enemy territory, construct units and examine each sectors' resources. Research tasks are set on the war map as well. All of these are done within a pausable real-time system. The player can pause it any time to set up new orders.

When the player is invading (or invaded by) an enemy territory, the game switches to the "Battle map". At this point the game works quite similarly to Command & Conquer. The player must control each of their units to destroy the opponent within the sector and not lose all their units (and buildings if defending). The battle map is also used if the player wishes to set up unit and structure building tasks and queues in one of their sectors, but they cannot examine an enemy-held sector without attacking. Time spent on the battle map does not affect time on the war map.

The most important building in the game is the Command Post/Communications Centre. It allows construction of other facilities within that sector and also allows units to move into adjacent neutral and enemy sectors. If the Command Centre is destroyed in a battle, all other facilities within that sector are wiped out regardless of their condition.

Unlike most RTS computer games, units typically consist of multiple vehicles in squadrons of three or five, except for highly specialised or utility units which consist of only one vehicle. Neither side uses infantry units. The Martians use large vehicles with powerful weapons, which can take a lot of damage but begin the campaign with only one sector under their control and limited resources. The Humans have smaller, much weaker vehicles, but are capable of larger groups of units, quicker build times and more territory and resources at the start of the campaign. The humans rely mostly on mobile artillery, WWI-style tanks and ironclad warships. Some of the Human vehicles seem advanced for the game's time setting (1898), such as submarines, blimps, and tank drills. When playing on the Martian side, the player should expect to be attacked by up to 75 individual human vehicles in a single battle, on some occasions. The Humans can build water units, such as Ironclads, which can greatly damage Martian defenses, while requiring the Martian ground forces to wade out into the ocean to retaliate. The Martians can build a number of extremely specialised vehicles, varying from the mind reading and manipulating Xeno-Telepath, to the Tempest, an extremely powerful machine that carries two heavy Heat-Rays and black smoke canister launcher.

Resource usage is different from the trend of the time. There are no gathering units that manually gather resources, and the resources are not used to purchase units. Instead, each sector has three resources in certain levels of abundance. Units and facilities consume these resources at a certain rate depending on the type and the action currently being performed. These resources are drawn from the sector the building or unit is in, and the sectors directly surrounding it. The more tasks assigned, the higher amount of resources required. Resource deficiencies will result in decreased efficiency, and increased time for unit/structure building and repairs. The player can build facilities to extract these resources at a faster rate. The human resources are steel, coal and oil. The Martians use copper, human blood and heavy elements.

Although it is single player only, a semi-functional form of multiplayer appears to be accessible, with some registry modification.

== Music ==
The game features an instrumental techno/electronica soundtrack, consisting of eight remixed tracks from Jeff Wayne's Musical Version of The War of the Worlds. These remixes were arranged, engineered, programmed and mixed by the musical group Max Mondo, along with Stephen Murphy. Jeff Wayne himself oversaw the remixing process.

There are four Red Book audio tracks on each disc. Two of them play during the war map screen and the other two play during a battle. A music player is included within the game's menu.

The music was re-used for the PlayStation game the following year, but Dead London was omitted as it was felt it did not fit with the atmosphere of said game.

== Impact ==
It was one of the earlier real-time strategy games to use 3D models instead of sprites for units. The game also features 3D terrain, which can be used strategically. The game suffered from significant performance problems on the hardware of the time, mainly due to the sheer number of vehicles on screen (often thanks to the Humans) as well as the fact there is no 3D hardware support.

Some of the introductory animations of the game featuring the scenes on Mars were later recreated for the War of the Worlds live show, with some dialogue from these scenes re-used (from Mars being declared to be no longer capable of sustaining life up to mentioning the modifications to the Martians' technologies being able to overwhelm the human defences). The dialogue would be re-recorded for the New Generation version (while adding a new line of dialogue where the Martians declare that "It is time for Mars to thrive again on Earth's young, unprotected soil.").

== Reception ==
Reception

Review scores
Publication	Score
AllGame	3/5
Computer Gaming World	2.5/5
GameStar	65%
Génération 4	2/6
IGN	5.8/10
PC Accelerator	6/10
PC Games (DE)	68%
PC PowerPlay	70%
PC Zone	85%

The game received mixed to average reviews from critics.
