= Ken Griffin (organist) =

American organist (1909–1956)

Kenneth W. "Ken" Griffin (December 28, 1909 – March 11, 1956) was an American organist.

== Biography ==
Griffin was born in Columbia, Missouri. His biggest hit was "You Can't Be True, Dear" (1948), which was first released as an instrumental, and later that year re-released with a vocal by Jerry Wayne dubbed in. Both versions became popular, selling over 3.5 million copies. He also starred in a 1954-55 syndicated television series, 67 Melody Lane. He recorded on a variety of recording labels, especially Columbia.

It was in the 1940s in Aurora, Illinois, that Griffin broke into the nightclub circuit, playing at the Rivoli Cafe nightly. The sessions at the Rivoli were broadcast on the radio station, WMRO, and the program became popular.

Griffin died on March 11, 1956, in Chicago, Illinois, at the age of 46, of a heart attack, and was buried at Lincoln Memorial Park in Aurora. Columbia had many hours of Griffin's unreleased recordings on tape, and continued to release "new" recordings of Griffin's music for a number of years after his death. His version of "Ebb Tide" was played in the fifth-season premiere of the TV drama Mad Men.

== Partial discography ==
- Anniversary Songs Columbia 10-inch Lp CL 6177; 12" Lp CL-586/CS-8781*
- Skating Time Columbia 12" Lp CL-610 (Also available on 10" Lp)
- Lost In A Cloud Columbia 12" Lp CL-662
- The Music of Irving Berlin Columbia 10" Lp CL-6120
- Christmas Carols Columbia 10" Lp CL-6130
- Hawaiian Serenade Columbia 10" Lp CL-6206
- When Irish Eyes Are Smiling Columbia 10" Lp CL-6245
- Latin Americana Columbia 10" Lp CL-6263
- Cruising Down The River Columbia 12" Lp CL-761/CS-9042*
- Hymns Of America Columbia 10" Lp CL-6298
- You Can't Be True, Dear Columbia 12" Lp CL-907/CS-8790*
- Moonlight And Roses Columbia 12" Lp CL-1207/CS-8848*
- The Organ Plays At Christmas Columbia 12" Lp CL-692
- 67 Melody Lane Columbia 12" Lp CL-724
- Greatest Hits Columbia 12" Lp CL-2717/CS-9517*
- Sentimental Serenade Harmony (Columbia) 12" Lp HL-7384/HS-11184*
- Ken Griffin at the Wurlitzer Organ Philips 10" Lp B 07755 R*
- Great Organ Favorites Harmony/Columbia 12" LP H 31028
- At The Great Organ Rondo-lette 12" LP A30
- The Sparkling Touch Columbia 12" Lp CL 1709
- To Each His Own Columbia 12" Lp CL 1599
- On The Happy Side Columbia 12" Lp CL 1518
- Hawaiian Magic Columbia 12" Lp CL 1062
- Plays Romantic Waltzes Columbia 12" Lp CL 1365
- Love Letters In The Sand Columbia 12" Lp CL 1039
- Let's Have a Party (And Everybody Sing) Columbia 12" Lp CL 1127
- Ebb Tide Columbia 12" HS-11226
- The Fabulous Ken Griffin Harmony Columbia 12" HS 11184
- Sentimental Me Rondo-lette longplay A17
- Sentimental Journey Harmony 12" Lp HS 11329
