= Jeff Wayne's Musical Version of The War of the Worlds =

Studio album by Jeff Wayne
- Released: 9 June 1978
- Recorded: 18 May 1976 – 30 June 1977
- Studios: Advision, London; Abbey Road, London (strings); Wally Heider, San Francisco (Richard Burton's voice)
- Genre: Progressive rock
- Length: 94:54
- Label: CBS
- Producer: Jeff Wayne

Jeff Wayne chronology
Jeff Wayne's Musical Version of The War of the Worlds (1978)	Highlights from Jeff Wayne's Musical Version of The War of the Worlds (1981)

Singles from Jeff Wayne's Musical Version of The War of the Worlds
- 1. "Forever Autumn" Released: 2 June 1978; 2. "The Eve of The War" Released: 18 August 1978; 3. "Brave New World" Released: 13 October 1978; 4. "Thunderchild" Released: 29 December 1978

Jeff Wayne's Musical Version of The War of the Worlds is a studio double concept album by American-British composer and musician Jeff Wayne, released on 9 June 1978 by CBS Records. A progressive rock and orchestral retelling of H. G. Wells's 1898 science fiction novel, the work is structured as an "album musical" that employs narration, leitmotifs, and rhyming melodic lyrics to convey the story from the perspective of a Victorian journalist. The production features a prominent ensemble cast, including actor Richard Burton as the spoken-word narrator, alongside vocal and dramatic performances by Justin Hayward, David Essex, Phil Lynott, Julie Covington, and Chris Thompson.

Wayne conceived the adaptation after being introduced to the novel by his father, and secured the rights from Wells's estate in 1975. Developed over three years with a script by his stepmother Doreen and lyrics by Gary Osborne and Paul Vigrass, the recording process saw its original budget expand significantly from £35,000 to approximately £240,000. The musical design blends a conventional rock rhythm section, synthesized arrangements by Ken Freeman, and a 48-piece string orchestra conducted by Wayne himself. The album's visual identity was established through an accompanying lavish booklet featuring acclaimed sci-fi illustrations by painters Mike Trim, Geoff Taylor, and Peter Goodfellow.

Upon its release, the album defied contemporary punk rock trends to become an international success. It peaked at No. 5 in the UK and reached number one in 11 countries, eventually spending over 330 weeks on the British charts. It spawned two hit singles: the acoustic ballad "Forever Autumn", featuring Hayward on lead vocals, and the disco-inflected instrumental theme "The Eve of the War". The work won two Ivor Novello Awards, including Best Instrumental or Popular Orchestral Work, and received critical acclaim for its narrative fidelity and ambitious sonic production.

The War of the Worlds has sold over 2.7 million copies in the UK alone and an estimated 15 million worldwide. Its critical and commercial longevity has sustained an enduring multimedia franchise, including video game adaptations, remix packages, and an arena-scale touring production featuring advanced animatronics and holographic projections. A definitive re-recording, The New Generation, was released in 2012 featuring Liam Neeson as the Journalist, followed by an immersive theatrical experience in London that ran for seven years.

== Plot summary ==
=== Sides one and two: The Coming of the Martians ===
Clip of Jeff Wayne The War of the Worlds
During the Journalist's narration, the album's leitmotif plays in the background. The Sung Thoughts of the Journalist is then heard.

In a prologue, the Journalist notes that in the last years of the 19th century nobody would have believed that human affairs were being watched from space, yet planet Earth had in fact long been enviously observed by advanced beings who had drawn their plans against humanity.

The Journalist's account begins later that year, with the sighting of several bursts of green gas which, for ten consecutive nights, erupt from the surface of Mars and appear to approach Earth. Ogilvy, an astronomer convinced that no life could exist on Mars, assures the Journalist there is no danger. Eventually, something crashes onto Horsell Common, and in the resulting crater Ogilvy discovers a glowing cylinder, the top of which begins to unscrew. When this lid falls off, a Martian creature emerges. By now a crowd has gathered on the common, and when a group of inquisitive men approaches the cylinder they are incinerated by the Heat-Ray—an advanced weapon of the Martians. The Journalist flees with the crowd. Later, hammering sounds are heard from the pit. A company of soldiers is deployed at the common, and that evening an injured and exhausted Artilleryman wanders into the Journalist's house and tells him his comrades have been killed by fighting machines—tripod vehicles built and controlled by the Martians, each armed with its own Heat-Ray. They set off for London—the Journalist to ensure his lover Carrie is safe, the Artilleryman to report to headquarters—but are soon caught in a crossfire between soldiers and Martians and are separated. Three days later the Journalist arrives at Carrie's house but finds it empty. He resolves to escape London by boat and later catches sight of Carrie aboard a steamer, but the gangplank is raised before he can join her. Fighting machines then approach, threatening the steamer, but they are engaged by the Royal Navy torpedo ram Thunder Child and two are destroyed. The steamer escapes, but Thunder Child and her crew are destroyed by the Martian heat-rays, leaving England defenceless against the invasion.

=== Sides three and four: The Earth Under the Martians ===
The wandering Journalist discovers that red weed—the vegetation that gives Mars its color—has taken root on Earth and spread rapidly across the landscape. In a churchyard, he encounters the Parson Nathaniel and his wife Beth. The trio takes refuge in a nearby cottage that is soon surrounded by black smoke—a Martian chemical weapon. Nathaniel, driven mad by his horrific experiences of the Martian attacks, blames himself for the invasion and believes the invaders are demons arising from human evil. As Beth attempts to restore his faith in humanity, a Martian cylinder crashes into the cottage; Beth is buried under the rubble and killed. The newly arrived Martians construct a handling machine: a squat, spider-like vehicle used to capture and collect humans. After nine days of hiding in the ruins, the Journalist and Nathaniel see the Martians 'eating'—harvesting human blood and injecting it into their own veins. Nathaniel resolves to confront the 'demons', believing that he has been chosen to destroy them with his prayers and holy cross. The Journalist knocks him unconscious to silence his ravings, but the Martians are already alerted. A mechanical claw explores the cottage and drags Nathaniel away. Eventually, the Martians abandon their camp and the Journalist continues his journey to London. He again encounters the Artilleryman, who is planning a new life underground that would allow humans to evade the Martians and ultimately strike back with reverse-engineered fighting machines. The Journalist, however, realizing the Artilleryman's ambitions far exceed his abilities, soon leaves. Upon reaching London, he finds the city desolate and empty. Driven to suicide by intense despair and loneliness, he surrenders to a fighting machine but realizes it is inert, the Martian inside dead.

In the first epilogue, the Journalist reports that the Martians were defeated by Earth's bacteria—to which they had no resistance—and that, as humanity recovered from the invasion, he was reunited with Carrie. But, he says, the question remains: is Earth now safe, or are the Martians learning from their failures and preparing for a second invasion?

In the second epilogue, set 80 years later, a NASA mission to Mars flounders when the control centre from Pasadena loses contact with the uncrewed spacecraft. The controller sees a green flare erupt from Mars' surface. The controller tries to contact NASA, but all communication seems to have been blocked. The album ends with the fate of the Earth ambiguous, with the possibility of a second Martian invasion.

=== Differences from Wells' novel ===
- The novel takes place in the early 20th century, though its introduction does mention the Martians began their plotting at the end of the 19th century. This is shared with the musical version, but the musical version does not state whether its action takes place in the 20th century.
- Another difference in the musical is that the lyrics state the first cylinder was launched on midnight on the 12th of August. Thus the events of the invasion start in late august. Unlike the novel, when the invasion starts in June.
- The Journalist is an amalgam of two of Wells' characters: a writer of speculative philosophy, who narrates much of the novel, and his younger brother who is a medical student and narrates the flight from London and HMS Thunder Child sequences.
- Carrie, The Journalist's fiancée, does not exist in the novel, where the narrator has an unnamed wife.
- The character of the curate, who is not given a name in the novel, is changed to a parson named Nathaniel, who is introduced in the second act instead of prior to the Thunder Child sequence.
- Beth, Parson Nathaniel's wife, also does not exist in the novel.
- The handling machines are not used for collecting humans in the novel. They are instead used for assembling fighting machines.
- Concept art for the musical states the fighting machines to be 400 feet tall, four times their height in the novel.

== Production ==
=== Background and writing ===
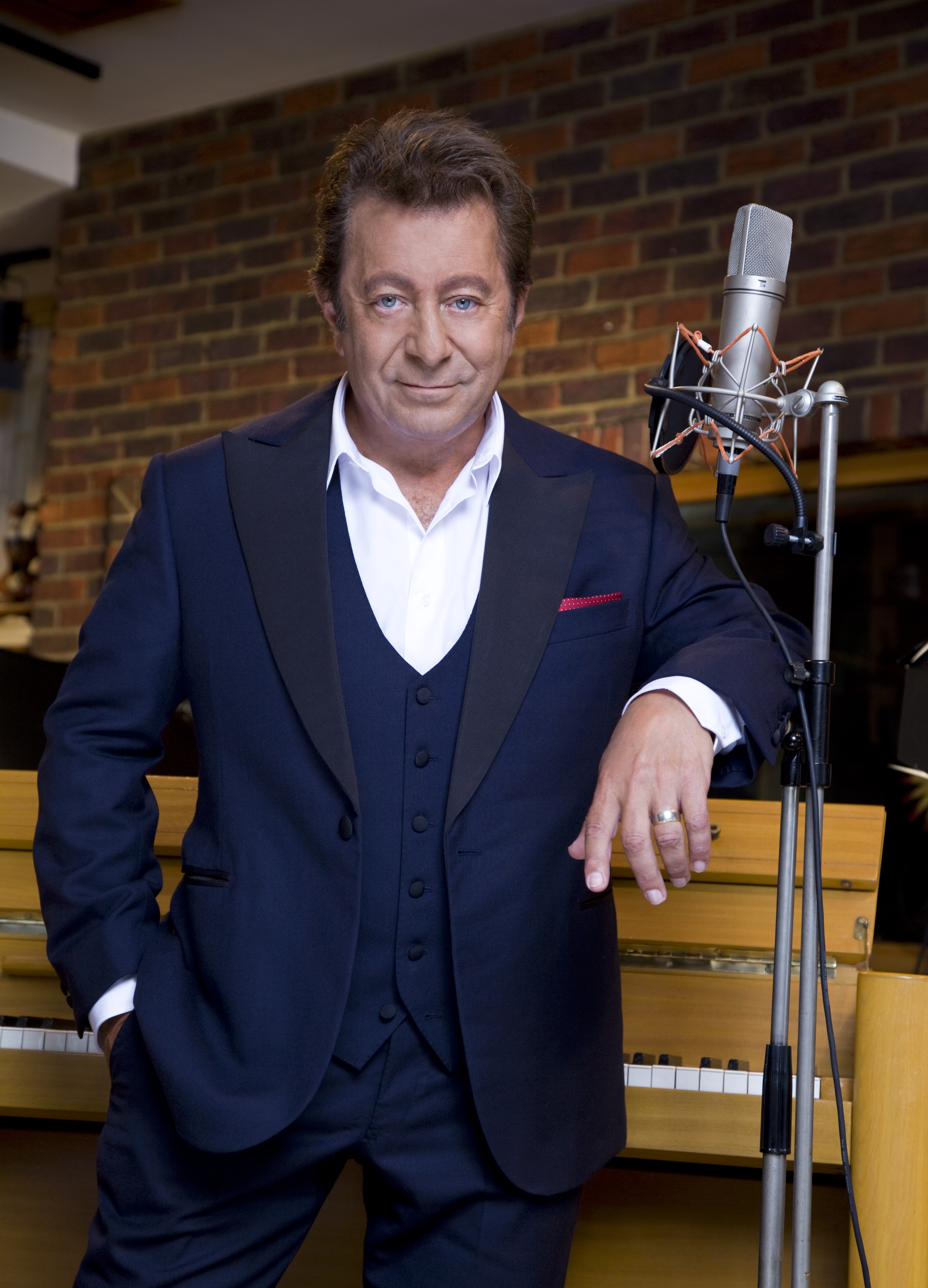
Jeff Wayne in 2014

The album originated when Wayne was touring with singer-songwriter David Essex, for whom he also worked as producer and musical director. Wayne felt the composing side of his career "had diminished" by this time, and started looking for a story "to get passionate about" and interpret musically, to which his father Jerry suggested the science-fiction novel The War of the Worlds by H. G. Wells. The story instantly caught Wayne's imagination, and he finished the book in a single read. He later said that a musical adaptation of other books was possible, and recalled being impressed by Twenty Thousand Leagues Under the Seas by Jules Verne, The Day of the Triffids by John Wyndham, and Brave New World by Aldous Huxley. However, Wayne went on to read Wells's book "three or four times" and saw the 1953 film adaption, and decided it was the most suitable for a musical adaptation.

In January 1975, Wayne and his father acquired the rights to adapt the work from Wells's estate, which at the time was overseen by Wells's son Frank. Wayne spent three months locating Frank Wells, and found his ideas were well received because it was the first adaptation that stayed true to the story. Wayne was aware of the famous 1938 radio drama adaptation directed and narrated by Orson Welles, but he wanted to stay close to the original story and set his version in Victorian England. From the start Wayne saw his adaptation as an opera, with "story, leitmotifs, musical phrases, sounds and compositions that relate to the whole." He wanted the music to have a "big, symphonic" sound when humans were telling the story, and a more aggressive and electric-based sound when the Martians were in action. Wayne started by "organising a cast of characters", while having the book adapted to fit the content of the songs he had outlined for it by Doreen Wayne, his future stepmother who at the time was an established script writer and journalist. Wayne used artistic licence to create a love interest by replacing The Journalist's brother with Carrie, his wife. At the same time, Wayne started to write the score and record demos in the studio, paying particular attention to how Wells originally wrote the story as a series of episodes with multiple cliff hangers to each chapter. Wayne recalled that he "wanted to have a bit of pressure" applied to the project in January 1976, so he booked studio time at Advision Studios in Fitzrovia, London for May of that year. The idea proved to be productive for Wayne, who completed a draft of the entire work in six weeks.

The disco influence on "The Eve of the War" was Wayne's intention of wanting the album to be entertaining for people. "The Red Weed" was the most difficult piece for Wayne to compose, as he wanted to create "a beautiful melody, and a beautiful dissonance." "Forever Autumn" originated as a jingle for a Lego commercial sung by Gary Osborne and Paul Vigrass. Upon learning that the journalist discovers that his fiancée is missing, Wayne reminded himself of the Lego tune and because it received a positive reception as a commercial, Wayne adapted it into a complete song with lyrics. The piece is the only part of the album that derived from pre-existing material. Wayne lived close to Primrose Hill at the time of writing, which is where the Martians come to their demise in the novel. While walking his dog in the morning he often sat at the top of the hill, which inspired him to envisage what Wells was describing and in turn his score, which was particularly the case for "Dead London". "Epilogue (Part 2)" was influenced by the Viking program, which saw two space probes land on Mars in 1976. It originally featured Wayne sharing the dialogue with his father Jerry, but "the gulf between his performance and mine was too great, so we sacked me!" Effects were applied to Jerry's voice to make it sound more individual.

=== Casting ===
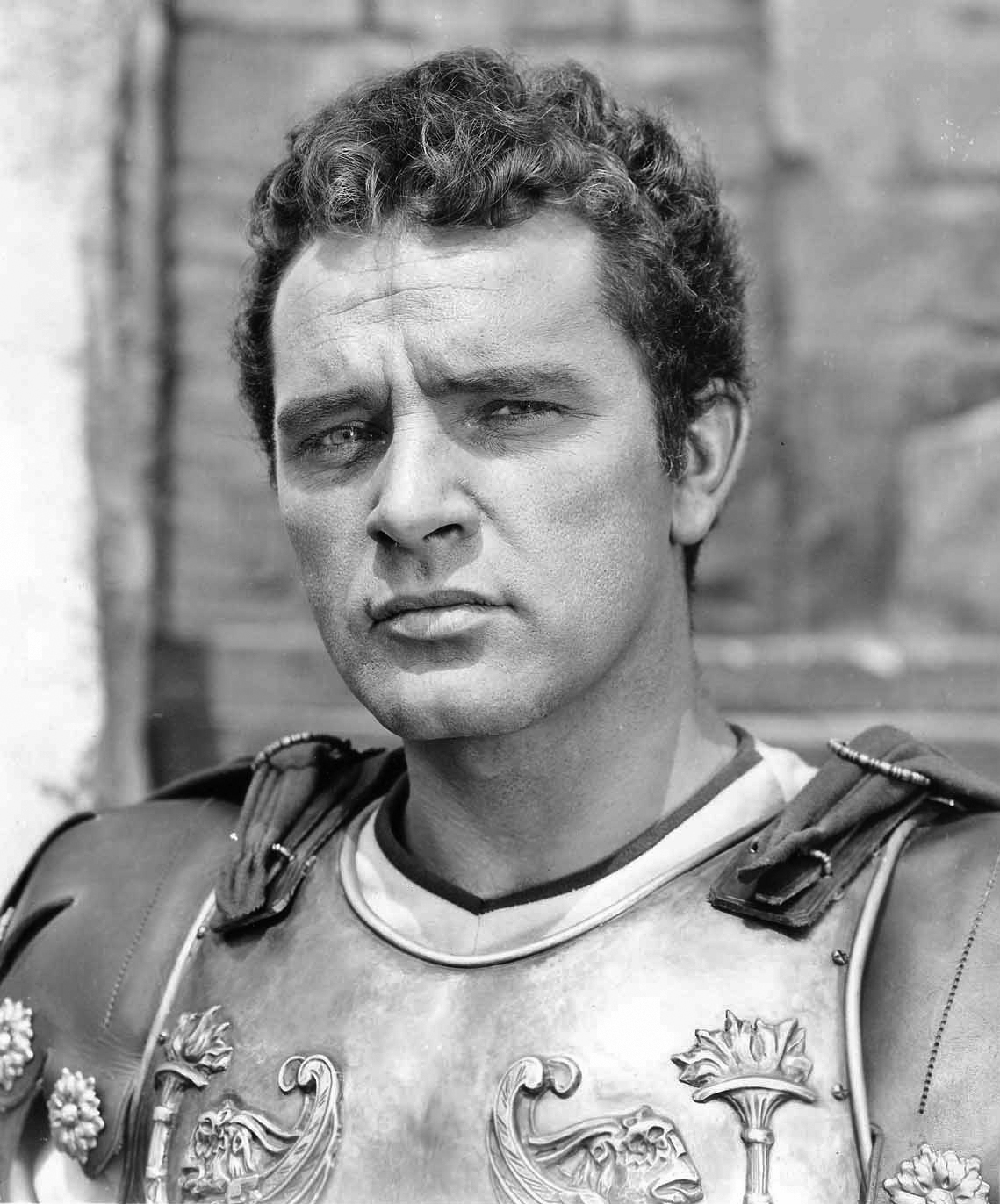
Richard Burton (Voice of George Herbert, the Journalist, who also narrates the story)

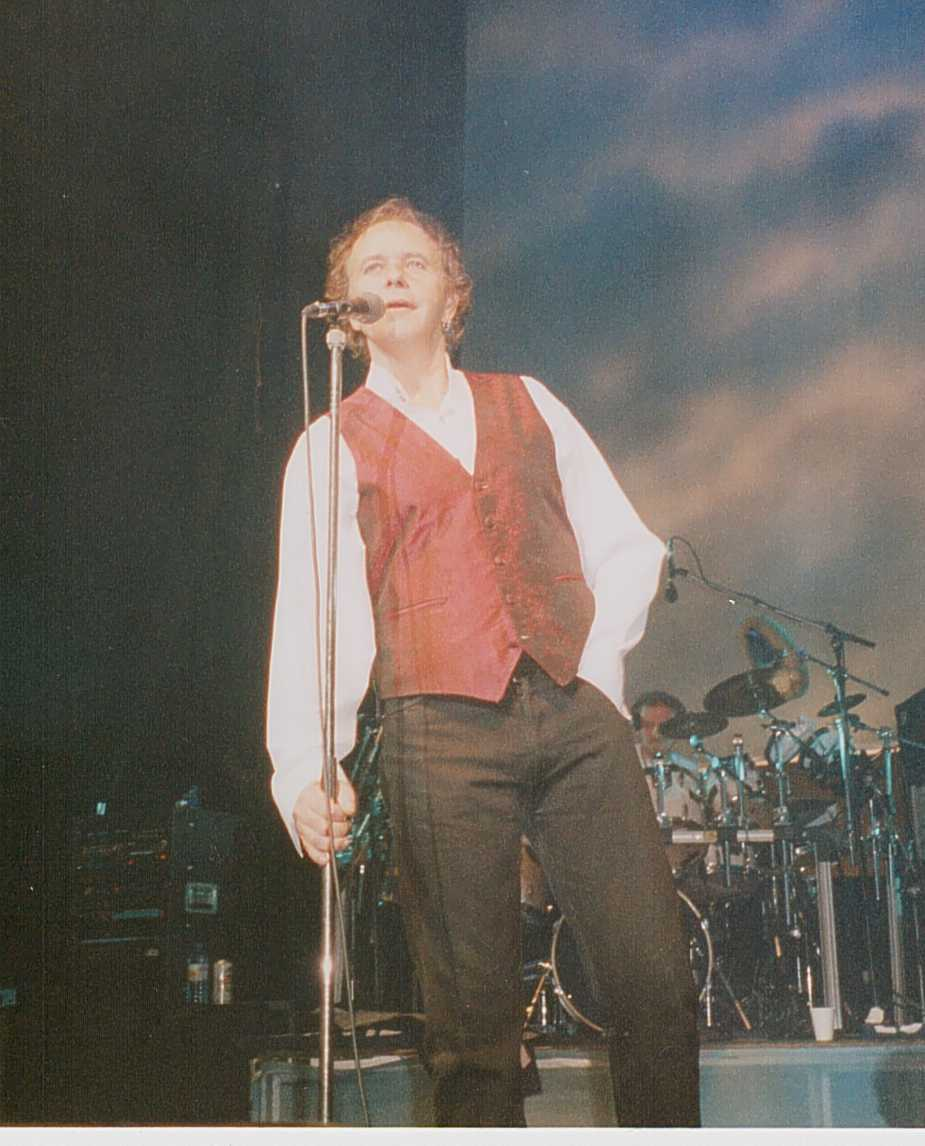
David Essex (Voice of The Artilleryman)

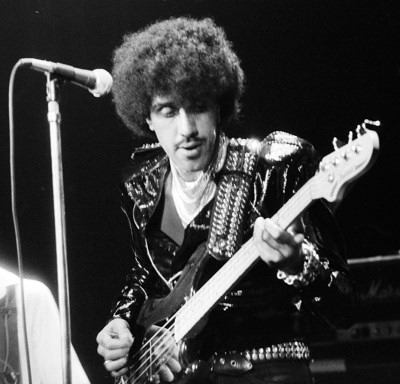
Phil Lynott (Voice of Parson Nathaniel)

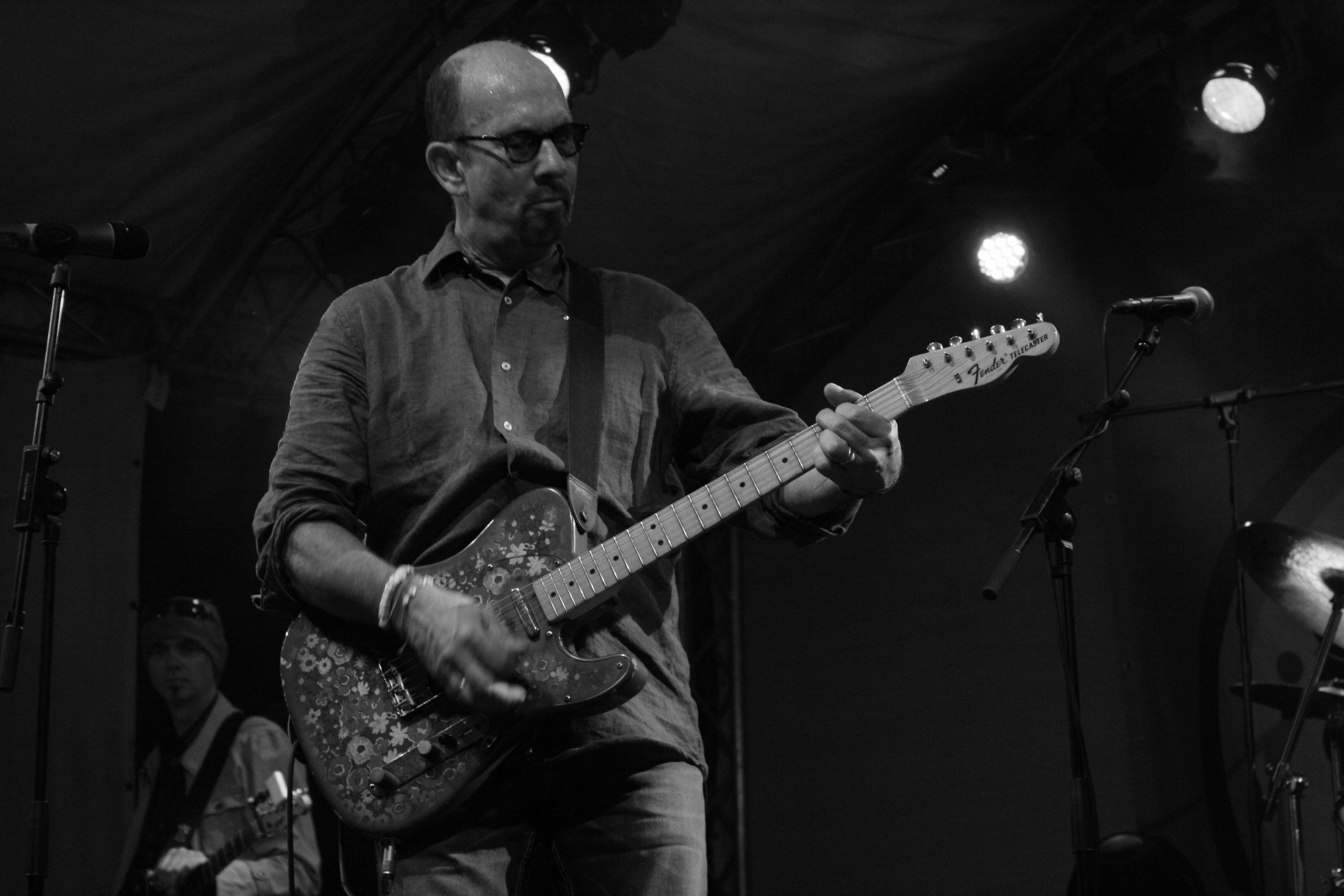
Chris Thompson (Voice of The Voice of Humanity )

Because Wayne wanted to keep his adaptation set in Victorian England, this eliminated the possibility of hiring American people in the main cast. In the early stages, he realised the importance of finding the right person to narrate the story, and actor Richard Burton was at the top of "a very short list" of candidates, and compared his voice to a musical instrument. Upon learning that Burton was in a production of the play Equus in New York City, Wayne delivered a letter with a copy of the album's script to the stage doorman and hoped for him to read it. After two or three days, Burton agreed to take part. Burton had already committed to start work on Exorcist II: The Heretic (1977) in Los Angeles after the Equus run, so Wayne organised to record the narration there to avoid further delays. Burton originally signed on for five days of recording for a maximum of 12 hours for each, but he finished his parts in just one day, except for an additional three-hour session held several months after for what Wayne described as "some repair work". Essex, who was present at the recording session, said that Burton insisted on narrating without hearing the music, which became "a bit of a nuisance" since Wayne and he had recorded their shared vocals in time with the background tracks. "So we had to do it wild."

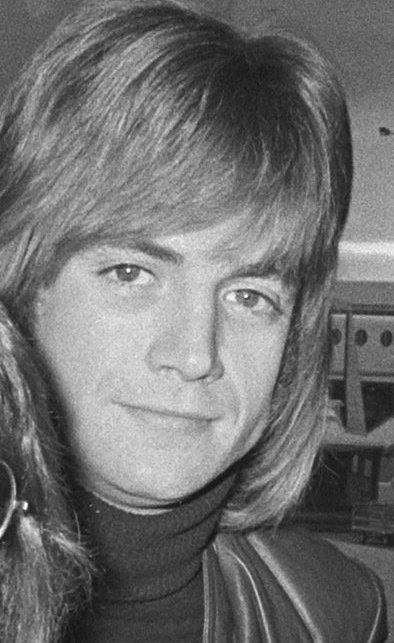
Justin Hayward, lead singer and guitarist for the Moody Blues, sings the song "Forever Autumn" (sung from the perspective of the Journalist), which was a hit single from the album.

It was important for Wayne that the different voices on the album sounded "convincing and believable". Having become a good friend of Wayne's, David Essex is the voice of the artilleryman. He had previously starred in a production of the musical Godspell, which also featured Julie Covington, who subsequently met Wayne and agreed to voice Beth. Although Wayne had not previously met the other voice actors: Thin Lizzy frontman Phil Lynott as Parson Nathaniel, Moody Blues vocalist Justin Hayward singing the Journalist's thoughts, and Manfred Mann's Earth Band guitarist and vocalist Chris Thompson as the Voice of Humanity, he was "thrilled" that they took part "because they each brought their own sort of magic, their style and performance and singing." Wayne had to convince the guest artists that they were the right performers for their role, and got them keen to carry out their parts. Wayne thought Hayward was the right singer for "Forever Autumn" and sent him a demo with the invitation to participate, but Hayward was unconvinced. He changed his mind when a "young lad" and employee of The Moody Blues' record shop in Cobham, heard the demo and told Hayward it was an ideal song for him. Lynott was on a Canadian tour with Thin Lizzy when it was time to record his parts, so Wayne organised for his vocals to be recorded there.

Initially Wayne had Carlos Santana record guitar riffs and hooks to interpret the Martian's heat-ray, but his involvement ended after one day when Santana's manager spotted an issue in the contract and certain requests could not be met. The role of Parson Nathaniel was originally given to Free and Bad Company singer Paul Rodgers, and although Wayne thought he delivered "fantastic" vocals, Rodgers was reluctant to take on the speaking part and dropped out. Wayne has these early recordings on his original multitrack tapes, but has no interest in releasing them. The Who frontman Roger Daltrey was to also make an appearance.

=== Recording and finalising CBS deal ===
The album was recorded at Advision from 18 May 1976 to 30 June 1977. Wayne is credited as the album's sole producer, with Geoff Young as recording engineer with Laurence Diana assisting. The album was one of the first recorded on 48-track, which was achieved by Maglink, a prototype system that allowed the synchronisation of two 24-track Studer A80 machines with a SMPTE timecode reserved on two of the available 48 tracks. Wayne recalled that Maglink malfunctioned often and the lack of expertise to fix problems resulted in delays in recording. When recording finished, 77 reels of multitrack tapes had been used. Mixing was done in sections, as little as 30 seconds or two minutes at a time. Soon after mixing was complete, the tape operator accidentally slashed through the tape containing side four as he thought it was a reel of unwanted outtakes. Wayne was subsequently offered free studio time to produce another mix. Wayne's initial version of the work was a little over two hours, which had to be refined in order to fit four sides of a vinyl record. The final version runs at 95 minutes. The album's packaging includes a 16-page colour booklet with artwork and a synopsis of the tracks.

The album features Ken Freeman on synthesisers, who started with a Minimoog and ARP Odyssey. Later in production, a Yamaha CS-80 was brought in which was used to re-record various overdubs, including the horns. Freeman was able to create various sound effects from scratch, including a military drum sound on "The Artilleryman and the Fighting Machine". Among the synthesisers used was the Thunderchild SZ3540, a custom made monophonic model built by JWM Electronics. Wayne wanted to create the Martian war-cry of "ooll-la" (which they chant before destroying their foes with their heat-rays) with a synthesiser, but he and Freeman could only create sounds that resemble "ooo" and "ahhh" and not the "l". The final effect was achieved with a multitrack "voicebox guitar effect" devised and voiced by Jo Partridge, who plays guitar on the album and made the sound "as dramatic as possible." (Partridge is consequently credited on the record as "the Heat Ray".) All but one of the foley sound effects heard on the record were created by Wayne's wife Geraldine. Wayne said the one that he is asked about the most is the sound of the cylinder unscrewing when the Martians emerge from their spaceship, which he achieved by turning and scraping two kitchen saucepans together that Young then amplified and captured in stereo. Most of the musicians on the album had also played on Essex's debut studio album Rock On (1973). Wayne wrote out the various parts of the score for the band, which was performed live in the studio without any click tracks, leaving the group "to groove together, and then move onto the next tune." It took one week to record almost an entire side of the album. The string section consisted of violins, violas, cellos, and double basses, totalling fifty players led by violinist Patrick Halling. It was recorded in the course of two evenings at Abbey Road Studios.

Wayne's original budget estimate for the album was £34,500. Later he secured a £70,000 recording deal with Dick Asher of CBS Records during an American tour with Essex. Initially the deal involved a single album of "thematic pieces" and without any guest artists, but his idea for the album had grown to produce a full-scale musical adaptation of Wells's novel which could not fit on one record, and the idea expanded into a double album with CBS agreeing to fund an additional £34,500 and cover a part of Burton's fees. Although his contract with CBS did not guarantee a public release, Wayne consulted his wife and parents who encouraged him to continue and finish the album despite the substantial costs involved in its production. When the album was finished, its cost totalled £240,000, half of which was paid by CBS. Wayne was "too chicken" to deliver the finished product to CBS himself, so he had his future wife Geraldine, then an assistant to the label's business affairs director, to hand it in. After reviewing the album for thirty days, CBS praised its strong story, songs, guest artists, and uniqueness, but doubted if people were willing to listen to a double album of continuous material, and believed its chance of success would suffer with Wayne, an American, producing an adaptation of an English novel. However, the label was unaware that Wayne had also produced an alternate version of the album with the songs reduced to three or four minutes and with new introductions and endings, making it easier to get the album on the radio. Wayne agreed to give CBS another month to decide, after which its UK division gave it the green-light for release.

=== Artwork ===
Wayne originally commissioned Roger Dean, best known for his work for the progressive rock band Yes, to produce the artwork for the album. After Dean produced some designs, Wayne felt the work did not quite fit for what he had in mind, and proceeded to look elsewhere. He approached John Pasche, who went on to design the logo on the front cover, and direct the overall design of the record's sleeve which features paintings from three artists: Geoff Taylor, Mike Trim, and Peter Goodfellow. The front and rear cover wraparound artwork depicts a Martian fighting-machine firing upon HMS Thunder Child (although the vessel depicted is a much larger Canopus-class battleship). Dean adapted his unused designs for the album for the packaging of the 1987 shooting video game Terrorpods.

== Cast ==
=== Performers ===
Character	Original Album	First Tour	30th Anniversary Tour	The New Generation Album	The New Generation: Alive on Stage	The Final Arena Tour	West End	40th Anniversary Tour	Life Begins Again Tour	The Spirit of Man Tour	The Concert Experience
Character	1978	2006-2007	2009-2011	2012	2012-2013	2014	2016	2018	2022	2025	2026
The Journalist	Richard Burton	Richard Burton (pre-recorded)	Richard Burton (pre-recorded)	Liam Neeson	Liam Neeson (pre-recorded)	Liam Neeson (pre-recorded)	Liam Neeson (pre-recorded)	Liam Neeson (pre-recorded)	Liam Neeson (pre-recorded)	Liam Neeson (pre-recorded)	Damian Wilson
The Sung Thoughts of the Journalist	Justin Hayward	Justin Hayward	Justin Hayward	Gary Barlow	Marti Pellow	Brian McFadden	Michael Praed	Newton Faulkner	Justin Hayward	Charlie Simpson	Damian Wilson
The Artilleryman	David Essex	Alexis James Michael Falzon (2007, Australia/New Zealand)	Alexis James (2009) Jason Donovan (2010)	Ricky Wilson	Ricky Wilson	Shayne Ward	Daniel Bedingfield Simon Shorten	Adam Garcia	Kevin Clifton	Rou Reynolds	Jesse Smith
Parson Nathaniel	Phil Lynott	Russell Watson (2006) John Payne (2007) Shannon Noll (2007, Australia/New Zealand)	Shannon Noll (first half of 2009) Damien Edwards (second half of 2009) Rhydian Roberts (2010)	Maverick Sabre	Jason Donovan	Jason Donovan	Jimmy Nail	Jason Donovan	Duncan James	Max George Jonathan Vickers (Newcastle)	Kevin Davy White
Beth	Julie Covington	Tara Blaise (2006) Rachael Beck (2007, Australia/New Zealand) Sinéad Quinn (2007, UK)	Jennifer Ellison (2009) Liz McClarnon (2010)	Joss Stone	Kerry Ellis	Carrie Hope Fletcher	Heidi Range	Carrie Hope Fletcher	Claire Richards	Maisie Smith	Mollie Marriott
The Voice of Humanity	Chris Thompson	Chris Thompson	Chris Thompson	Alex Clare	Will Stapleton	Joseph Whelan	David Essex	Nathan James	Nathan James	Nathan James	Sam Tanner
The Voice of NASA	Jerry Wayne (pre-recorded)	Jerry Wayne (pre-recorded)	Jerry Wayne (pre-recorded)	Jerry Wayne (pre-recorded)	Jerry Wayne (pre-recorded)	Jerry Wayne (pre-recorded)	Jerry Wayne (pre-recorded)	Jerry Wayne (pre-recorded)	Jerry Wayne (pre-recorded)	Jerry Wayne (pre-recorded)	Jerry Wayne (pre-recorded)
The Voice of the Martians	—N/a	Lewis MacLeod (pre-recorded)	Lewis MacLeod (pre-recorded)	Lewis MacLeod (pre-recorded)	Lewis MacLeod (pre-recorded)	Lewis MacLeod (pre-recorded)	Lewis MacLeod (pre-recorded)	Lewis MacLeod (pre-recorded)	Lewis MacLeod (pre-recorded)	Lewis MacLeod (pre-recorded)	—N/a
Carrie: The Journalist's Fiancée	—N/a	Anna-Marie Wayne (pre-recorded)	Anna-Marie Wayne (pre-recorded)	—N/a	Anna-Marie Wayne (pre-recorded)	Madalena Alberto	Anna-Marie Wayne	Anna-Marie Wayne	Anna-Marie Wayne	Anna-Marie Wayne	—N/a
Carrie's Father	—N/a	—N/a	—N/a	—N/a	—N/a	Nigel Barber (pre-recorded)	—N/a	Nigel Barber (pre-recorded)	—N/a	Nigel Barber (pre-recorded)	—N/a
William Rowland, NASA Controller, Newspaper Boy, Male Understudy	—N/a	—N/a	—N/a	—N/a	Michael Falzon	Jonathan Vickers	—N/a	Jonathan Vickers	Jonathan Vickers	Jonathan Vickers Roseanna Harris (Newcastle)	—N/a
Vera May, Newspaper Girl, Female Understudy	—N/a	—N/a	—N/a	—N/a	Lily Osborne	Lily Osborne	Lily Osborne	Lily Osborne	Stephanie Aves	Roseanna Harris	—N/a
H.G. Wells age 33, 53, and 79	—N/a	—N/a	—N/a	—N/a	—N/a	Callum O'Neill	—N/a	—N/a	Callum O'Neill (pre-recorded)	Callum O'Neill (pre-recorded)	—N/a

=== Black Smoke Band ===
==== Current members (until 2022) ====
- Jeff Wayne – composer, conductor
- Olivia Jageurs – harp, percussion
- Accy Yeats – drums
- Pete Hunt – bass
- Thomas Gandey – keyboards, synthesisers
- Neil Angilley – piano, keyboards
- Chris Spedding – electric guitar, acoustic guitar
- Laurie Wisefield – guitars, mandolin, autoharp, tar
- Paul Bond - electric guitar, acoustic guitar, keyboards, backing vocals
- ULLAdubULLA Orchestra

==== Past members ====
- Herbie Flowers – bass guitar
- Huw Davies – electric guitar
- Hugh Burns – acoustic guitar
- Gaetan Schurrer – tar, keyboards
- Tom Woodstock – guitars, keyboards, backing vocals
- Gordy Marshall – drums
- Julia Thornton – percussion, harp, keyboards
- Steve Turner – keyboards
- Kennedy Aitchison – keyboards
- Colin Good – keyboards
- Ian Wherry – keyboards

== Release ==
The album premiered at a launch party at the London Planetarium on 1 June 1978, and featured a playback accompanied by a laser show. The event was attended by over 500 people. The album was released on 9 June; four weeks later, Wayne said he was able to repay CBS its share of the album's costs due to strong sales. In September 1978, the album reached its peak position of No. 5 on the UK Albums Chart, during a 20-week stay in the top ten. It has since been in the UK top 100 albums for 240 weeks, and has sold over 2.7 million copies in the country. In 2018, it was the UK's 32nd best-selling studio album of all time. Elsewhere, it charted in 22 countries and reached number one in 11 of them including Australia, where it was top for seven weeks. In April 1979, the album exceeded platinum status in the Netherlands, New Zealand, and Australia, and gold certification in Canada, Spain, Israel, and Belgium. The album has earned gold and platinum and multi-platinum sales certifications in 17 countries. The album has sold an estimated 15 million copies worldwide.

The album spawned two singles. On 2 June 1978, an edited version of "Forever Autumn" was released which went to No. 5 on the UK singles chart. This was followed by "The Eve of the War", released in September 1978. Some of the North American and European pressings featured new lead vocals from Thompson. In 1979, a seven-minute disco remix of "The Eve of the War" was released.

The album won two Ivor Novello Awards, including one for Wayne and Osborne for Best Instrumental or Popular Orchestral Work. In 1979, the album was named Best Recording in Science Fiction and Fantasy, in a panel of judges that included George Lucas, Steven Spielberg, and Alfred Hitchcock.

== Reception ==
Professional ratings
Review scores
Source	Rating
AllMusic	4/5 stars
Record Mirror	5/5 stars
Music Week	(positive)

The album had a positive review in Record Mirror, with reviewer Bev Briggs declaring it as "four sides of sheer excellence" and after reading the novel and watching the feature film, the album is "the most easily stomachable of the lot." She praised the music, ideas, script, and voices, all of which complement each other, but thought the continuous, 95-minute structure forces the listener to digest it straight through. A positive review was published by Ben Ostrander in the science-fiction magazine The Space Gamer, who thought the album was "magnificent" and despite some differences between the record and the original novel, it "is a kind of rock/radio play with modern interpretations" and is "better than most crap on TV, and makes for a fun evening around the stereo." Music Week commented that the album is "superb" and predicted it will become "one of the biggest sellers."

In 2020, writing for Prog, Alex Burrows described the record as "the ultimate concept album and best-selling prog soundtrack of all time", concluding "it's still an album that certainly ticks all the boxes of the true definition of 'progressive': groundbreaking, cutting-edge and seminal."

== Reissues and other versions ==
Wayne's alternate version of the album with the songs edited for radio airplay was distributed to stations to promote the original concept album. It became a success in its own right, prompting Wayne to prepare a full commercial release. The set, entitled Highlights from Jeff Wayne's Musical Version of The War of the Worlds, was released in 1981 by Columbia Records.

In addition to English, the album has been released in Spanish and German. The first Spanish edition featured Anthony Quinn re-recording the Journalist's narration and other dialogue originally voiced by Essex, Covington, and Lynott. The songs and the background music were not altered. Following its release in November 1978, Wayne had to re-do the album because Quinn's script was in Mexican Spanish and not Peninsular Spanish. The second edition features narration by Teófilo Martínez, and released in 1979. Wayne found it amusing as the Spanish division of CBS had recommended him to use Quinn for the role. A German album followed in 1981 featuring Curd Jürgens as the Journalist, plus radio broadcasts in Dutch and Hebrew. Although versions in Japanese, Russian, French, and Italian were planned, none of them came into fruition.

A 1989 version of "The Eve of the War" remixed by Ben Liebrand reached number 3 in the UK singles chart.

A 1995 edition of the album featured additional remixes of some tracks and additional conceptual art. On 23 June 2005, the original album was re-released in two forms: one in a remastered 2-disc hybrid multichannel Super Audio CD set; another in a 7-disc "Collector's Edition" featuring additional remixes, outtakes, the actors reading from the unabridged script, excerpts from the Quinn and Jürgens performances, as well as a seventh disc being a DVD showing the making of the album, produced by Phoenix Film & Television Productions. This release went to No. 7 in the UK. Both contained new stereo and 5.1 surround sound mixes by Gaëtan Schurrer and Gary Langan, who had access to Wayne's tape archive and discovered 372 quarter-inch master tapes that were identified, digitised, and pieced back together from the original tracking sheets. The process involved a re-fit of Wayne's home studio, including the installation of a high end Pro Tools rig and a surround sound monitoring system. Wayne bought a Magilink machine at auction for 50p in order to read the original Magilink timecode, but could not get it to work, so Schurrer used the blips and beeps produced by the timecode on the waveform display in Pro Tools as a guide.

In 2000, a collection of remixes of tracks from the original album—including several used in the 1998 computer game—were released on a double CD titled The War of the Worlds: ULLAdubULLA—the Remix Album. While most of the contributors are relatively unknown, the album includes two versions of a remix of "Dead London" by Apollo 440 and other remixes by house-music pioneer Todd Terry. Following the success of the 2005 re-release of the original album, ULLAdubULLA II was released on 17 April 2006. This single CD release was largely made of tracks from the original remix album, with some additional new remixes by Tom Middleton and DJ Keltech, and hip-hop versions of two tracks by DJ Zube. Middleton's remixes of "The Eve of the War" were also released on CD and vinyl.

In 2025, a deluxe edition re-release including the contents of the previous Collector's Edition, the UllaDubUlla remixes, The New Generation, and recordings of the 2006 Alive on Stage and 2012 Alive on Stage! The New Generation tours, as well as two blu-ray discs containing the video recordings of the two tours, was released. This version comes in two varieties, with the 'Ultimate Edition' also containing the 1978 and 2012 programs on vinyl.

=== The New Generation ===
In 2011, Wayne held a press conference in London to announce the release of a new arrangement of the original album, subtitled The New Generation. Wayne explained that the idea was to return to the original album and explore the characters in more detail, and develop the love story between Herbert and his fiancée Carrie. The project also gave Wayne the opportunity to reinterpret his compositions with contemporary production techniques. The album replaces all of the original cast, including actor Liam Neeson as the Narrator and Kaiser Chiefs frontman Ricky Wilson as the Artilleryman. The album was released in November 2012 by Sony Music Entertainment, and peaked at No. 13 in the UK chart. It was supported by an arena tour, followed by a stage show adaptation, running at the Dominion Theatre in London's West End from February to April 2016.

== Tours ==
In September 1978, Wayne had entered negotiations with Paramount Pictures over the film rights and with two concert producers, one of which being Showco, to present a live stage version of the album. The idea came to nothing, and it took Wayne until 2006 to stage a concert tour of the album.

Tour	Start date	End date	Notes
First tour (2006-07)	April 2006	December 2007	Produced by Wayne, Ray Jones, and Damian Collier, the first tour visited the UK, Ireland, Australia, and New Zealand. Wayne conducted the 48-piece ULLAdubULLA Strings and 10-piece Black Smoke Band. A "virtual" Richard Burton (a large bust of the Journalist onto which was projected an image of a young Burton with a super-imposed actor's mouth and jaw lip synched to the original Burton recordings) performed as The Journalist. A model fighting machine featured on stage. A short animated prequel to the story was also presented in the style of the upcoming feature film detailing the Martians' ecological destruction of their own world and their preparations to invade Earth (adapted from the introduction for the Martian campaign from the 1998 computer game, also retaining the remix of "The Red Weed" used in said intro).
30th Anniversary (2009-11)	9 June 2009	3 October 2011	Launched in June 2009 to commemorate the 30th anniversary of the original album release and included dates across Europe. The virtual Richard Burton was improved; the whole face was animated (an actor was found with a similar facial structure, all of Burton's narrative parts were mimed, and his face was superimposed onto the face of the actor).
The New Generation: Alive on Stage (2012-2013)	29 November 2012	8 January 2013	A tour promoting The New Generation album, featuring a Liam Neeson hologram as The Journalist replacing the virtual image of Richard Burton.
The Final Arena (2014)	27 November 2014	16 December 2014	Included dates in the UK and the Netherlands. Featured the addition of Carrie's father as a new character and lyrics to "Life Begins Again". A prologue was performed as a pre-show segment with the characters performing among the audience rather than on stage. Featured actor Callum O'Neill who portrayed H.G. Wells in three separate stages of his life.
West End production (2016)	8 February 2016	30 April 2016	West End stage production at the Dominion Theatre which ran in early 2016.
40th Anniversary (2018)	30 November 2018	17 December 2018	Staged to commemorate the 40th anniversary of the original album release, with dates across the UK. Featured a new setup of staging, choreography, costumes, and a new cast of actors, and a reprise of "Forever Autumn" from the 2016 West End production.
Life Begins Again (2022)	23 March 2022	18 April 2022	Staged to commemorate the 15th anniversary of the original 2006 tour. Featured an arched bridge running from the lip of the stage out over the audience, panoramic screens showing 2 hours of CGI footage, a new lighting production, pyrotechnics and special effects, including levitation.
The Spirit of Man (2025)	28 March 2025	20 April 2025	
Live! The Concert Experience (2026)	9 October 2026	4 November 2026	A smaller-scale tour performance of the original 1978 program for concert halls and theatres, presented by Kilimanjaro. Features animation and full on-stage narration. The first official tour not to be conducted by Jeff Wayne.

=== 2012-2013: The New Generation: Alive on Stage tour ===
A live tour based on the album began on 29 November 2012 and began playing across the UK and Europe. The live show, titled Jeff Wayne's Musical Version of The War of the Worlds – The New Generation: Alive on Stage!, includes a holographic performance of Liam Neeson, interacting with the other performers. Ricky Wilson retains his role as the Artilleryman from the album version. Marti Pellow (lead singer of the Scottish pop group Wet Wet Wet) is the Sung Thoughts of the Journalist. British rock band Jettblack's lead vocalist Will Stapleton is the Voice of Humanity. The touring cast includes Jason Donovan (who previously played the Artilleryman on tour) as Parson Nathaniel and West End theatre star Kerry Ellis as Beth. Michael Falzon and Lily Osborne appear as new characters William Rowland and Vera May respectively, appearing in a new prologue that segues into an updated version of the animation depicting the Martians' preparations for their invasion of Earth, introduced to the tour in 2009. Falzon also plays the small role of NASA controller Jerome Marvin Krauth (voiced by Jerry Wayne, recorded for the original 1978 album) in the Epilogue Part 2, in which he gets blasted by the fighting machine onstage behind him (the original version of Epilogue Part 2 had an abrupt ending) which concludes the show.

Alive on Stage! also includes other new content not featured on The New Generation album, such as a new scene opening Act II between The Journalist (Liam Neeson) and Carrie, his fiancée (Anna-Marie Wayne). This new piece, entitled "Distant Shores", is an exchange between the two after they have been separated and is seen onstage via holographic projections of both characters in which they express hope they may one day see each other again, speaking as though to each other, from distant shores. The show also includes effects used previously on tours including the use of pyrotechnics, now much improved, in which the audience is blasted by real heat rays, leaves fall upon the audience during "Forever Autumn", and a levitation effect is used after Beth is killed during the Spirit of Man.

Bassist Herbie Flowers and Guitarist Chris Spedding, both part of the original 1978 album and later the original 2006 live tour, again tour as members of The Black Smoke Band for Alive on Stage The rest of the band remain relatively unchanged from the album and previous tours, except Gordy Marshall from the album is replaced by Accy Yeats on drums. Jeff Wayne conducts The Black Smoke Band and the ULLAdubULLA Strings as he has done on tours before. On 15 December Michael Falzon announced on Facebook, as did Kerry Ellis and Will Stapleton on Twitter, that the sold-out show at the O2 Arena in London was to be filmed for DVD release, distributed by Universal; this was confirmed by the official website. The DVD film was later shown on Universal's The Shows Must Go On! YouTube channel on 23 October 2020 and was available for that weekend. This release was dedicated to Falzon, who died on 23 June 2020 from germ cell cancer and included a link to a donation page for the Chris O'Brien Lifehouse where he was treated.

List of The New Generation European tour 2012-2013 dates
Date		Venue	Location
November	29	3Arena	Dublin
December	1	Echo Arena	Liverpool
December	2–3	Motorpoint Arena	Cardiff
December	4	Capital FM Arena	Nottingham
December	6	Wembley Arena	London
December	7	Barclaycard Arena	Birmingham
December	8	Manchester Arena	Manchester
December	9	Motorpoint Arena	Sheffield
December	10	Metro Radio Arena	Newcastle
December	11	Scottish Exhibition and Conference Centre	Glasgow
December	13–14	Bournemouth International Centre	Bournemouth
December	15	O2 Arena	London
December	16–17	Brighton Centre	Brighton
December	19	Rotterdam Ahoy Arena	Rotterdam
January
January	4	König Pilsener Arena	Oberhausen
January	5	O2 World	Berlin
January	7	Nuremberg Arena	Nuremberg

=== 2014: The Final Arena tour ===
In November 2013, it was confirmed that Jeff Wayne's Musical Version of The War of the Worlds – The New Generation would tour arenas again in late November through December 2014 for The Final Arena tour. Tickets went on sale 22 November 2013. The tour took place across the UK and the Netherlands, beginning in Sheffield on 27 November 2014 and coming to a close on 16 December 2014 in Amsterdam. Three of the guest performers were confirmed at the time of the tour announcement. Westlife's Brian McFadden played the role of the Sung Thoughts of the Journalist (played by Martin on the previous tour), Les Misérables' Carrie Hope Fletcher played Beth (played by Kerry Ellis on the 2012 tour), and Jason Donovan reprised his role of Parson Nathaniel. At the time, Jeff Wayne also announced that another guest had been confirmed but was yet to be announced. Later announcements confirmed Shayne Ward as the Artilleryman, Joseph Whelan as the Voice of Humanity, and Jonathan Vickers as the NASA Controller (voiced again by Jerry Wayne). Other changes included adding the character of Carrie's Father (actor Nigel Barber) and lyrics to the song "Life Begins Again".

Later in the year, the final guest was announced as actor Callum O'Neill, who portrayed H.G. Wells on stage in three separate stages of his life. After the William Rowland and Vera May prologue was moved into a pre-show (with the characters performing among the audience rather than on stage), O'Neill appeared in a new prologue as a 33-year-old Wells, opening the show with a speech about 19th century England during the dying moments of 1899. He introduces himself and his work on The War of the Worlds before the on-screen introduction of the Martians. Later, just before Act II begins, O'Neill appears again as a 53-year-old Wells, discussing the end of World War I and speaking about the destructive capabilities of humankind. O'Neill appears a final time at the end of the show, just before the NASA epilogue, this time as a 79-year-old Wells, elderly and in a wheelchair. Set just after the end of World War II, he is dying but now speaks about the extent of atrocities committed during the recent war, how human beings can, in some shapes and forms, be as destructive as the Martians had been in his novel.

The Final Arena tour ended on 16 December 2014 in Amsterdam. Speaking about the last show, Jeff Wayne said, "Bringing The War of the Worlds to life in many of the world's finest arenas has been the most amazing experience for me over the last seven years. We've achieved more than we ever thought was possible both musically and technologically. However, the time is right to take The War of the Worlds in new directions after the 2014 tour."

List of The Final Arena European tour 2014 dates
Date		Venue	Location
November	27	Motorpoint Arena	Sheffield
November	28	Echo Arena	Liverpool
November	29	SSE Hydro	Glasgow
November	30	Manchester Arena	Manchester
December	2	Capital FM Arena	Nottingham
December	3	Metro Radio Arena	Newcastle
December	5	LG Arena	Birmingham
December	6	First Direct Arena	Leeds
December	7-8	Motorpoint Arena	Cardiff
December	10-11	Bournemouth International Centre	Bournemouth
December	13	O2 Arena	London
December	14-15	Brighton Centre	Brighton
December	16	Heineken Music Hall	Amsterdam

=== 2016: West End production ===
It was announced that The War of the Worlds was to make its theatrical debut in a "re-imagined" West End production at the Dominion Theatre in London's West End, produced by Wayne and Bill Kenwright. It ran from 8 February to 30 April 2016 and featured direction by Bob Thompson, an onstage orchestra conducted by Jeff Wayne, and Liam Neeson as the Journalist in the usual 3D holography. Jimmy Nail played Parson Nathaniel, Daniel Bedingfield was The Artilleryman, and Heidi Range appeared as Beth. Alongside them was Michael Praed as George Herbert, Madalena Alberto playing Carrie, and singer-songwriter-producer David Essex as The Voice Of Humanity (Essex worked with Jeff Wayne even before he played the Artilleryman in the original 1978 album). Due to the indisposition of Daniel Bedingfield during the run, the Artilleryman was played by understudy and West End performer Simon Shorten for several shows; later Shorten took over as the Artilleryman for the remaining month of the run. Several musical changes were made for the West End production including a key change for the song "Thunder Child", a new song written for the production titled "With Joy and Hope and Wonder", as well as a "Forever Autumn" duet at the beginning of Act II.

The 2016 West End production of Jeff Wayne's The War of The Worlds received mixed reviews.

=== 2018: 40th Anniversary tour ===
In early 2018, Jeff Wayne announced that The War of The Worlds would be touring again with a special limited two-month UK Tour celebrating the album's 40th anniversary. A new setup of staging, choreography, costumes, and cast of actors was introduced. Liam Neeson's narration and holography were once again used in the show. Newton Faulkner starred as the Sung Thoughts of the Journalist, Adam Garcia as the Artilleryman, Anna-Marie Wayne as Carrie, Inglorious' Nathan James as The Voice of Humanity, Jason Donovan returned to play Parson Nathaniel, Carrie Hope Fletcher again as Beth, Lily Osborne reprised her role as Vera May, and Jonathan Vickers again played the NASA Controller. The new song for the 40th Anniversary tour, which was first seen in the 2016 West End production, was a reprise of "Forever Autumn". This was performed by both Anna-Marie Wayne and Newton Faulkner as their respective characters at the beginning of Act II.

The cast of players for the 40th Anniversary tour received critical acclaim, with many praising the acting, singing, and chemistry between Jason Donovan and Carrie Hope Fletcher during "The Spirit of Man". Nathan James' performance as the Voice of Humanity also received praise, and the inclusion of Anna-Marie Wayne as Carrie was also acclaimed.

List of 40th Anniversary tour 2018 dates
Date		Venue	Location
November	30	SSE Hydro	Glasgow
December	1	Metro Radio Arena	Newcastle
December	2	Manchester Arena	Manchester
December	4	First Direct Arena	Leeds
December	5	Echo Arena	Liverpool
December	7	Motorpoint Arena	Nottingham
December	8	Genting Arena	Birmingham
December	9-10	Motorpoint Arena	Cardiff
December	12-13	Bournemouth International Centre	Bournemouth
December	15	O2 Arena	London
December	16-17	Brighton Centre	Brighton

=== The True Story of the Martian Invasion (cancelled 2021 tour) ===
In March 2020, Jeff Wayne announced a new tour of The War of the Worlds for 2021 with new technological advances being added to the production. Liam Neeson's filmed footage would be used once again. The True Story of the Martian Invasion would journey across the UK as well as Amsterdam (for the first time since 2014) during March and April 2021. This would mark the 15th anniversary of the first War of the Worlds live tour, based on the 1978 album, which began in the UK and Ireland in April 2006. The press release announced "new features for the 2021 tour include the giant arched bridge now running from the lip of the stage out over the audience to the front of house desk" and "three panoramic screens with two hours of cutting edge CGI". The release touted the usual "big and bold lighting, pyrotechnics and other-worldly special effects, as well as a ground-breaking levitation effect". The release mentioned "the incineration of a cast member in full view of the audience" and "the release of deadly Black Smoke from the Martian Fighting Machine". The press release compared the planned 2021 tour to its original 2006 counterpart: "In 2006, TWOTW was already considered a cutting-edge production with six trucks filled to the brim. But in 2021, which marks a momentous 15 years of live touring, the production is up to 12 trucks, and with it, a host of ingredients and special effects that will challenge and excite the senses."

By 10 September 2020, it was announced that The True Story of the Martian Invasion would be cancelled due to laws that were brought about by the COVID-19 pandemic prohibiting the number of individuals that could be present during indoor events.

=== 2022: Life Begins Again tour ===
On 10 September 2020, Jeff Wayne announced the Life Begins Again 2022 tour. The announcement discussed the postponement of its previously announced 2021 UK and European Tour. The Life Begins Again tour is named after an existing song within the Musical Version, a song about life returning to normal following the Martians' failure to foresee Earth's bacteria. "Now, mankind will look forward to life beginning again", said the press release.

The tour featured former Strictly Come Dancing dancer Kevin Clifton as the Artilleryman and Steps' Claire Richards as Beth. On 28 September 2021, the full cast was announced, including Duncan James as Parson Nathaniel, Nathan James again playing his role of The Voice of Humanity, Anna-Marie Wayne as Carrie; the Journalist's Fiancé, and, from the original 1978 album, Justin Hayward as The Sung Thoughts of the Journalist. Liam Neeson's holographic footage was once again used in the show. Callum O'Neill reprised his role from the 2014 Final Arena tour as H.G. Wells (although this time his performance was shown on screen, rather than live). Jonathan Vickers reprised his role as the NASA controller, and Stephanie Aves joined the company as Vera May.

List of Life Begins Again UK & European tour 2022 dates
Date		Venue	Location
March	23	Motorpoint Arena	Nottingham
March	24	bp Pulse Live	Birmingham
March	26	Motorpoint Arena	Cardiff
March	27-28	Brighton Centre	Brighton
March	29-30	Bournemouth BIC	Bournemouth
April	1	AO Arena	Manchester
April	2	SSE Hydro	Glasgow
April	3	first direct Arena	Leeds
April	5	Bonus Arena	Hull
April	6	M&S Bank Arena	Liverpool
April	7	Utilita Arena	Newcastle-Upon-Tyne
April	9	O2 Arena	London

=== 2025: Spirit of Man tour ===
On 3 December, 2023, Jeff Wayne announced the Spirit of Man tour. As with the previous tour, this tour is named after an existing song within the Musical Version.

The tour featured The Wanted's Max George as Parson Nathaniel, and his partner and former EastEnders actor Maisie Smith as Beth, the Parson's wife. On 22 July, 2024, Enter Shikari's Rou Reynolds was announced as the Artilleryman. Reynolds was chosen in part because he could play the trumpet, and this would feature in "Brave New World" and "Dead London". On 2 December, the remainder of the cast was announced. Nathan James returned as the Voice of Humanity, having portrayed the role in the previous two tours, and Busted's and Fightstar's Charlie Simpson was announced as the Sung Thoughts of the Journalist. Jonathan Vickers reprised his role as the NASA controller, and Roseanna Harris was cast as Vera May. Due to an undisclosed issue, Jonathan Vickers stood in for Max George as Parson Nathaniel on the Newcastle tour date, with Roseanna Harris filling in for his role as the NASA controller.

List of Spirit of Man tour UK and Europe 2025 dates
Date		Venue	Location
March	28	Connexin Live	Hull
March	30	3 Arena	Dublin
April	1	P&J Live Arena	Aberdeen
April	2	The OVO Hydro	Glasgow
April	3	First Direct Arena	Leeds
April	5	Utilita Arena Newcastle	Newcastle
April	6	Co-op Live	Manchester
April	8	Utilita Arena Sheffield	Sheffield
April	9	M&S Bank Arena	Liverpool
April	10	Motorpoint Arena	Nottingham
April	12	Brighton Centre	Brighton
April	13-14	Bournemouth International Centre	Bournemouth
April	16-17	Utilita Arena	Cardiff
April	18	bp pulse LIVE	Birmingham
April	20	O2 Arena	London
April	22	Rotterdam Ahoy	Rotterdam

=== 2026: The Concert Experience tour ===
On 24 November 2025, Jeff Wayne announced The Concert Experience tour, a smaller-scale performance of the original 1978 double-album intended for concert halls and theatres and produced by Kilimanjaro Live. The announcement stated that this tour would be the first official tour in which he would not be conducting, but that it would serve as a companion to the larger arena tours.

The tour features Damian Wilson as the Journalist and the Sung Thoughts of the Journalist, Jesse Smith as the Artilleryman, Sam Tanner as The Voice of Humanity, The X-Factor series 14 finalist Kevin Davy White as Parson Nathaniel, and Mollie Marriott as Beth.

List of Live! The Concert Experience tour 2026 dates
Date		Venue	Location
October	6-7	Belfast Waterfront	Belfast
October	9	SEC Armadillo	Glasgow
October	10	Playhouse	Edinburgh
October	11	Caird Hall	Dundee
October	13	O2 City Hall	Newcastle
October	14	Barbican Centre	York
October	15	Bradford Live	Bradford
October	17	New Theatre	Oxford
October	18	O2 Apollo	Manchester
October	19	Philharmonic Hall	Liverpool
October	21	Royal Concert Hall	Nottingham
October	22	Civic Hall	Wolverhampton
October	23	The Forum	Bath
October	24	Eventim Apollo, Hammersmith	London
October	26	Plymouth Arena	Plymouth
October	27	Building Society Arena	Swansea
October	28	Guildhall	Portsmouth
October	29	Plymouth Arena	Plymouth
October	31	Opera House	Blackpool
November	1	Stockton Globe	Stockton-On-Tees
November	3	Regent Theatre	Ipswitch
November	4	Cliffs Pavilion	Southend-On-Sea

== Related works in other media ==
=== Video games ===
In 1984 CRL Group PLC released Jeff Wayne's Video Game Version of The War of the Worlds for the ZX Spectrum home computer. This was released in Germany as Jeff Wayne's Video Version von Der Krieg der Welten.

In 1998, a real-time strategy game, Jeff Wayne's The War of the Worlds, was created by Rage Software for personal computers. Wayne produced the musical arrangements for the game, consisting of 45 minutes of material rescored and remixed in a newer electronica style with techno beats. The game's artwork was based on the Michael Trim, Geoff Taylor and Peter Goodfellow illustrations from the original album booklet. Some of Richard Burton's dialogue as the journalist is used in the opening and closing scenes. Nigel Hawthorne and Lewis MacLeod voiced the human and Martian generals respectively.

In 1999, a third-person shooter, also entitled Jeff Wayne's The War of the Worlds, was developed by Pixelogic and released for the Sony PlayStation. It used much of the 1998 game's music and graphical elements, but featured an entirely different campaign with a focus on vehicular combat.

=== Unrealized animated film ===
In late 2004 the ULLAdubULLA II production had been commissioned for an animated CGI film version. Test footage of some Martian machines was released, but the film itself never materialised.

=== DVD ===
A two disc Region 2 DVD of the 2006 Wembley Arena, London show was released 6 November 2006 by Universal. Disc 1 contains the live show and Disc 2 contains extras and a documentary of the making of the live show. It is titled Jeff Wayne's Musical Version of The War of The Worlds – Live on Stage.

The 2012 Alive on Stage! tour at the O2 Arena was recorded and released across cinemas in the UK and Europe in April 2013. The War of the Worlds team worked with the distribution company More2Screen, a company that brings special events to the cinema. The recorded show was well received in a series of platform digital screenings in the UK before it transitioned to home entertainment; it was released on DVD in November 2013. DVD releases of The Final Arena and 40th Anniversary tours are unlikely to ever come to fruition.

=== The Musical Drama ===
On 15 October 2018 it was announced on the album's official Facebook page and website that after over a year in work, an audiobook rendition would be available on Audible.com on 29 November 2018. This five hour-long Audible Original Production featured new story and musical content. The cast included Michael Sheen as the journalist, Taron Egerton as the artilleryman, Ade Edmondson as Ogilvy, Theo James as Parson Nathaniel and Jeff Wayne's daughter Anna Marie Wayne as Carrie, the wife of the journalist.

=== The Immersive Experience ===
In May 2019, Jeff Wayne's The War of the Worlds: The Immersive Experience opened to the public in London. Set across 22,000 sq. ft of space, the 2-hour production combined music from the album, immersive theatre and virtual reality, holograms, and other techniques. The cast includes Tom Brittney, Anna Marie Wayne, Carrie Hope Fletcher, and David Burnett, joined by a live cast of twelve actors. On April 30, 2026, it was announced that The Immersive Experience had closed after Ellipsis Entertainment had ceased operating. This followed a £400,000 upgrade and attempts by The Jeff Wayne Music Group to take over the production.

== Track listing ==
All music was written by Jeff Wayne, and all lyrics were written by Wayne, Paul Vigrass and Gary Osborne. All tracks (except for “Epilogue (Part 2) (NASA)”) feature narration by Richard Burton, with dialogue written by Doreen Wayne.

Side one
No.	Title	Lyrics	Lead Vocals	Length
1.	"The Eve of the War"	Jeff Wayne	Justin Hayward	9:07
2.	"Horsell Common and the Heat Ray"			11:36
Total length:				20:43

Side two
No.	Title	Lyrics	Lead Vocals	Length
1.	"The Artilleryman and the Fighting Machine"		David Essex	10:36
2.	"Forever Autumn"	Jeff Wayne, Paul Vigrass, Gary Osborne	Justin Hayward	7:42
3.	"Thunder Child"	Jeff Wayne, Osborne	Chris Thompson	6:07
Total length:				24:25

Side three
No.	Title	Lyrics	Lead Vocals	Length
1.	"The Red Weed (Part 1)"			5:53
2.	"The Spirit of Man"	Jeff Wayne, Osborne	Julie Covington, Phil Lynott	11:38
3.	"The Red Weed (Part 2)"		Phil Lynott	5:25
4.	"The Artilleryman Returns"		Jeff Wayne	1:27
Total length:				23:43

Side four
No.	Title	Lyrics	Lead Vocals	Length
1.	"Brave New World"	Jeff Wayne, Osborne	David Essex	12:15
2.	"Dead London"			8:35
3.	"Epilogue (Part 1)"			2:31
4.	"Epilogue (Part 2) (NASA)"		Jerry Wayne	1:50
Total length:				24:31

== Personnel ==
Credits adapted from the 1978 LP and 2005 CD liner notes.

=== The Players ===
- Richard Burton – George Herbert, The Journalist
- Justin Hayward – The Sung Thoughts of The Journalist
- David Essex – The Artilleryman
- Chris Thompson – The Voice of Humanity
- Phil Lynott – Parson Nathaniel
- Julie Covington – Beth (Parson Nathaniel's wife)
- Jo Partridge – The Heat Ray
- Jerry Wayne – The Voices of NASA

=== The Musicians ===
- Chris Spedding – guitars
- Jo Partridge – guitars, mandolin
- Herbie Flowers – bass guitar
- Barry Morgan – drums
- Barry de Souza – percussion
- Roy Jones – percussion
- Ray Cooper – percussion
- Ken "Prof" Freeman – synthesisers, organ, electric piano
- Jeff Wayne – piano, jangle piano, harpsichord, conductor
- Paul Hart – piano on "The Red Weed"
- George Fenton – tar, santoor, zither
- Billy Lawrie – backing vocals
- Gary Osborne – backing vocals
- Chris Thompson – backing vocals
- Paul Vigrass – backing vocals
- Geraldine "Pest" Wayne – sound effects

=== Production ===
- Jeff Wayne – composer, orchestrator, producer
- Jerry Wayne – director of "dramatic and narrative sections"
- Doreen Wayne – script
- Charles Dubin – director of "dramatic and narrative sections"
- John Pasche – art direction, logo design
- Geoff Taylor – painting
- Mike Trim – painting, pencil sketches
- Peter Goodfellow – painting
- Denis "BilBo" Blackham – lacquer cut on side one
- Geoff Young – recording
- Laurence Diana – recording assistant
- Bill Foster – mastering at Tape One, London

== Charts ==
=== Weekly charts ===
Chart (1978–79)	Peak position
Australian Albums (Kent Music Report)	1
Canada Top Albums/CDs (RPM)	76
Dutch Albums (Album Top 100)	2
German Albums (Offizielle Top 100)	10
New Zealand Albums (RMNZ)	2
Swedish Albums (Sverigetopplistan)	16
UK Albums (Official Charts)	5
US Billboard 200	94

Chart (1995–97)	Peak position
Scottish Albums (Official Charts)	33
UK Albums (Official Charts)	23

Chart (2005–06)	Peak position
Australian Albums (ARIA)	22
Irish Albums (IRMA)	20
Scottish Albums (Official Charts)	8
UK Albums (Official Charts)	5

=== Year-end charts ===
Chart (1978)	Position
Australian Albums (Kent Music Report)	6
Dutch Albums (Album Top 100)	6
New Zealand Albums (RMNZ)	2

Chart (1979)	Position
New Zealand Albums (RMNZ)	22

Chart (1991)	Position
Australia Albums (ARIA)	55

Chart (1996)	Position
Australia Albums (ARIA)	84

== Certifications ==
Region	Certification	Certified units/sales
Australia (ARIA)	10× Platinum	730,000
Belgium (BRMA)	Gold	25,000^{*}
Canada (Music Canada)	Platinum	100,000^{^}
Germany (BVMI)	Gold	250,000^{^}
Netherlands (NVPI)	Platinum	150,000
New Zealand (RMNZ)	13× Platinum	195,000^{^}
Spain (Promusicae)	Gold	50,000^{^}
United Kingdom (BPI)	9× Platinum	2,700,000^{‡}
United States	—	200,000
Summaries
Worldwide	—	15,000,000
^{*} Sales figures based on certification alone.^{^} Shipments figures based on certification alone.^{‡} Sales+streaming figures based on certification alone.
