= The War of the Worlds (1984 video game) =

- Publisher: CRL Group
- Platform: ZX Spectrum
- Release: June 1st, 1984
- Genre: Adventure game
- Mode: Single player

The War of the Worlds, titled on screen as Jeff Wayne's The War of the Worlds and on the cover as Jeff Wayne's Video Game Version of The War of the Worlds is a ZX Spectrum video game developed and released by CRL Group in 1984. The game is based upon the 1978 concept album, itself based on H.G. Wells' 1898 novel The War of the Worlds.

Gameplay required the player to visit a series of sites in and around London, by moving a person using cursor keys or a joystick, and occasionally making choices such as whether to hide, run or stand still.

The game was unpopular with reviewers because it ran very slowly and the player was often killed (hunger and thirst being common causes of death) and forced to begin the adventure from scratch. Despite this, the game peaked at number 8 in the weekly computer game charts making it one of CRL's highest charting titles.

Original 2-page magazine advertisements stated 'available for ZX Spectrum' but also had a list of other formats the game was 'to be created for' including the Commodore 64, Oric Atmos, BBC Micro and Acorn Electron but no other versions were completed.

== Reception ==
In a 1992 survey of science fiction games, Computer Gaming World gave the title one-plus stars of five, advising readers to "curl up with the book instead".
