= Jeff Wayne's The War of the Worlds (1999 video game) =

- Developers: Pixelogic Limited; Kheops Studio
- Publisher: GT Interactive
- Producer: Bryan Reynolds
- Programmers: Chris Butler and David Worswick
- Artists: Richard Richter with Robin Ball and Simon Beal
- Composers: Jeff Wayne (original music); Max Mondo and Stephen Murphy (game remixes)
- Platform: PlayStation
- Release: EU: 19 November 1999
- Genres: Third-person shooter, vehicular combat, strategy
- Mode: Single-player

Jeff Wayne's The War of the Worlds is a vehicular combat third-person shooter video game. It was based primarily on the 1978 concept album Jeff Wayne's Musical Version of The War of the Worlds, but also draws from the original 1898 War of the Worlds novel by H. G. Wells. The game was developed by Pixelogic and released in Europe exclusively for the PlayStation in 1999. The game was never released in North America.

The game's visuals are based heavily on the album's artwork, which was created by Mike Trim, Geoff Taylor and Peter Goodfellow.

Though it reuses audio and graphical elements of Rage Software's PC game of the same title, and is set during the same time period, it is not a port, remake or re-release of that game, but an entirely different adaptation of the same source material.

== Gameplay ==
The player's Armoured Lorry under attack from several Martian units.

The game is played from a third-person perspective. The player must navigate three-dimensional environments while controlling various World War I-style military vehicles, such as armoured cars, mobile anti-aircraft platforms, tanks, cannons, motorbikes, and observation balloons. Each vehicle has its own unique mounted weapon (with the exception of the oil tanker, which can only self-destruct). These must be used to combat the Martian invaders, who pilot the fighting-machines, handling-machines, flying-machines and embankment-machines of the novel, in addition to various other advanced vehicles, many of which were created specifically for the PlayStation and PC games. The black smoke and red weed also appear as obstacles within the game. At any moment, the player can bring up the sidebar – a rudimentary map of the level, showing all human and Martian units currently in the area. From here the player can instantly switch to any human vehicle or turret currently in their control.

The game has fourteen pre-set levels, with varied missions such as destroying a Martian base, stealing a Martian flying-machine, and managing the evacuation of a human village. Some levels are more focused on strategy than direct combat; the player is often required to transport civilians, engineers, or soldiers from place to place, escort armoured lorries, and collect scrap material to be used in the creation of new vehicles. The game is not compatible with the PlayStation memory card. In order to save their progress, the player must note the password given at the end of each level (excluding the final one).

== Synopsis ==
=== Setting ===
The game takes place in 1890s Britain, and is faithful to the alternate-history setting of the source material. Throughout the game, the player gets the opportunity to explore numerous urban and rural locations, including London, Dover, Oxford, Glasgow, and the Scottish Highlands. The vehicles used by the human forces are generally appropriate to the setting, while the Martian war machines and installations are more fanciful and baroque, showing a steampunk influence.

=== Plot ===
The game has the same opening and closing cut-scenes as the PC game's human campaign. In the opening sequence, a group of military officials are taking part in an emergency conference. The previous morning, a bizarre craft had landed in Horsell Common near Woking. This cylinder contained the advance of an invading army; its occupants began to attack civilians and soldiers indiscriminately. The officials then listen to the testimony of a journalist who witnessed the attack (the journalist's dialogue is an edited version of the narration Richard Burton recorded for the album between 1976 and 1977). It quickly becomes apparent that the invaders are aliens from the planet Mars. The advance attack at Horsell Common was suppressed, and the four Martian war machines were defeated by human artillery, enabling the journalist to escape and give his testimony. The officials learn that several other Martian missiles are heading towards Britain, and prepare a military retaliation with the aid of their chief scientists and engineers, and the knowledge that, if Britain should fall, the rest of the world is sure to follow.

In the game's first level, the player is given military training, and learns how to control vehicles and fire turrets and vehicular weaponry. At the end of the level, the next Martian cylinder arrives, and the invasion begins wholesale. Throughout the game, the player must take control of various vehicles, each with their own strengths and weaknesses, and use them strategically to fight their way through Martian settlements, free humans from Martian farms, protect human cities and villages, and carry out various other missions in aid of the resistance.

The game's story resolution differs from that of the book and album in that the Martians do not succumb to the common cold virus. Instead they must be fought off with the use of military force and human ingenuity and cunning. Eventually the player reaches the Scottish Highlands, where the Martians have made their main base (in the novel and album, the Martian base was instead located in London). Once the player destroys the seven Martian Elders who are directing the invasion, the war ends, and peace is restored. The player's soldier character (now seen for the first time) escapes the destruction of the Martian base, and the journalist narrator wonders if the Martians might strike again some day. The album's NASA epilogue is omitted, leaving the game's conclusion closer to the open-ended ambiguity of the original novel.

== Soundtrack ==
The game has an instrumental techno/electronica soundtrack, consisting of seven remixes of music from Jeff Wayne's Musical Version of The War of the Worlds. These remixes were arranged, engineered, programmed and mixed by the musical group Max Mondo, along with Stephen Murphy, and were first heard in the War of the Worlds PC game released the previous year. Jeff Wayne oversaw the remixing process. The PlayStation game's score includes versions of "The Spirit of Man", "Brave New World", "Red Weed", "Horsell Common", "The Fighting Machine", and two versions of "The Eve of the War" (called the "Human" and "Martian" mixes). The player can pause the game and switch between any of the seven tracks at any time. The main menu of the game also includes a music player. The remix of "Dead London" featured in the PC game is omitted. Part of the game's soundtrack was later re-released in the ullaDUBulla remix album.

== Reception ==
The game received generally positive reviews. In June 1998, PlayStation Pro published a review, giving the game a score of 91%. In December 1999, PlayStation Plus rated the game at 8/10. PlayStation Extreme reviewed it in their 24th issue, giving it a score of 83%. In January 2000, German magazine Video Games reviewed the game, praising its variety and selection of vehicles, but criticising its controls and "average" graphics; they awarded it a score of 70%. NowGamer gave the game a score of 48, saying that "[its] plausible tactical element and heavy dose of blasting just about saves it from extinction, but it was a close run thing". Others criticised the game's unusual mixture of the third-person shooter and strategy genres.
