= You Can't Be True, Dear =

Song
- Language: German, English
- Written: Unknown
- Composer: Hans Otten
- Lyricists: Gerhard Ebeler (German); Hal Cotten (English)

"You Can't Be True, Dear" is a popular German song.

== History ==
It was originally written as a German language song, "Du Kannst Nicht Treu Sein," by composer Hans Otten and lyricist Gerhard Ebeler. English language lyrics and title were written by Hal Cotten.

In 1948, Ken Griffin recorded the song, first released as an instrumental and later with vocalist Jerry Wayne dubbing the lyrics, both of which became popular in releases by an independent company, Rondo Records. A number of other versions were also recorded that year.

The recording by Ken Griffin and Jerry Wayne was released by Rondo Records as catalog number 228. It first reached the Billboard magazine Best Seller chart on April 2, 1948 staying at #1 for seven weeks. The instrumental recording by Ken Griffin was released by Rondo Records as catalog number 128. It first reached the Billboard magazine Best Seller chart on July 2, 1948 peaking at #2. Both the vocal and solo organ versions charted for 23 weeks and sold an estimated 3,500,000 copies. Note that this version was recorded and released first, but charted after the vocal version.

== Renditions ==
A number of other versions were also recorded in 1948.

The recording by Dick Haymes with The Song Spinners was released by Decca Records as catalog number 24439. It first reached the Billboard Best Seller chart on May 28, 1948, and lasted 13 weeks on the chart, peaking at #9. Both sides of this recording were cover versions of bigger hits, but both charted; the flip side was "Nature Boy", a major hit for Nat King Cole.

The recording by The Sportsmen was released by Capitol Records as catalog number 15077. It first reached the Billboard Best Seller chart on May 28, 1948, and lasted 13 weeks on the chart, peaking at #11. The flip side, "Toolie Oolie Doolie," also charted.

The recording by The Marlin Sisters was released by Columbia Records as catalog number 38211. It first reached the Billboard magazine Best Seller chart on June 4, 1948, and lasted 4 weeks on the chart, peaking at #19. The flip side, "Toolie Oolie Doolie," also charted (oddly enough, in both The Sportsmen's and the Marlin Sisters' version, the same song was the flip side and in both cases, both sides made the charts).

The recording by Dick James was released by RCA Victor Records as catalog number 20-2944. It first reached the Billboard magazine Best Seller chart on June 25, 1948, and lasted 2 weeks on the chart, peaking at #19. This was his only charting hit.

Two artists in the United Kingdom also recorded the song at about the same time. Vera Lynn recorded the song on March 10, 1948, which was released by the UK Decca label under catalog number F-8883, and Dolores Gray made a recording on August 13, 1948, released by the UK Columbia label under catalog number DB 2451.

Vera Lynn's recording also charted in the United States. This recording was released by London Records as catalog number 202. It first reached the Billboard magazine Best Seller chart on May 21, 1948, and lasted 7 weeks on the chart, peaking at #14.

A revival of the song by Patti Page (Columbia Records catalog number 4-44345) became popular in 1965, spending 8 weeks on the Billboard Easy listening music chart, peaking at #11.

== Other recordings ==
- Eddy Arnold (1954)
- Pat Boone (1959)
- Carol Channing and Webb Pierce (1976)
- Connie Francis (1963)
- Will Glahe (1948)
- Ken Griffin (vocal: Jerry Wayne) (1948)
- Ken Griffin (Instr.) (1948)
- Dick Haymes and The Song Spinners (1948)
- Dick James (1948)
- Die Lustige München Musikanten (under the title "Du Kannst Nicht Treu Sein")
- Henry Lindblom with Stig Holm's "Rhythm Masters". Swedish lyrics written by Fritz-Gustaf, entitled "Som vind om våren". Recorded in Stockholm on December 28, 1948. It was released on the 78 rpm record His Master's Voice X 7464.
- Vera Lynn (1948)
- The Marlin Sisters with Eddie Fisher (1948)
- Mary Kaye Trio (1959)
- Patti Page (1965)
- Bob Ralston
- Somethin' Smith and the Redheads
- The Sportsmen (1948)
- Gale Storm
- Billy Vaughn
- Lawrence Welk
