= Peter Goodfellow (artist) =

British artist (1950–2022)

- Born: Peter George Goodfellow; 14 June 1950; Middlesbrough, England
- Died: 11 December 2022 (aged 72); Aberdeenshire, Scotland
- Occupation(s): artist, landscape painter

Peter Goodfellow (born 14 June 1950 in Middlesbrough, died 11 December 2022 at Aberdeen Royal Infirmary) was a British artist, known for his landscape pictures. He described himself as an 'out and out colourist' and often painted the same subject repeatedly to distil colour and form.

He was educated at Billingham North Primary then Bede Hall Grammar School. This was followed by studying art at Middlesbrough College of Art where he took a Foundation Course from 1967 to 1968 as well as a Degree Course at Central School of Art, London, from 1967 to 1971.

Goodfellow's career really kicked off in the early 1970s, beginning as a freelancer, illustrating book jackets, the first one being Arthur C. Clarke's Tales from the White Hart. With agents in Hamburg, New York and London, Goodfellow became established as one of Europe's leading illustrators in the field of book covers, package design and advertising.

Between 1972 and the late 1980s, Goodfellow's work could be found on science fiction book covers written by the likes of Philip K. Dick, Ray Bradbury, Stephen R. Donaldson and Olaf Stapledon. He also illustrated the pieces Horsell Common and Parson Nathaniel for musical album Jeff Wayne's Musical Version of The War of the Worlds.

Moving to Scotland in 1985, Goodfellow became a landscape artist in 1995, his work being widely exhibited.

Other works include creating the National Lottery "It could be you" finger and writing the book Treason of the Scholars. Treason critiques the Turner Prize and satirises contemporary artists such as Tracey Emin and Damien Hirst, accusing some of them of destroying the quality of the craft. The book includes contributions from David Starkey, Roger Scruton and Duncan Macmillan.

Living in Strathdon, Aberdeenshire, Goodfellow was inspired by art movements such as early Italian Renaissance and German Expressionism.
