= Ken Freeman (composer) =

British composer (born 1946)

Ken Freeman (born 1946) is a British composer and session musician, primarily playing piano and synthesisers.

He is most prominently known for his work playing most of the synthesisers on Jeff Wayne's Musical Version of The War of the Worlds, and also as the composer of the theme music for BBC television's Casualty and Holby City. His session career has included work with artists including Justin Hayward, David Essex and Elkie Brooks.

Freeman is also considered by many to be the inventor of the string synthesiser, creating a prototype version of a polyphonic instrument at home in order to be able to mimic the sound of a string section more accurately in the studio. This instrument would eventually be released as the Freeman string symphonizer.

Most recently in 2008, Freeman has been working on a new version of the music he composed for the BBC series The Tripods, in addition to composing and performing with jazz fusion band Orion, with guitarist Steve Locke, bassist Ben Hutchings and drummer Fred Beale.
