= Gary Osborne =

English singer and songwriter (born 1949)

Gary Osborne (born 1949 in London) is an English singer and songwriter. He chaired The Songwriters Executive of the British Academy Of Songwriters Composers and Authors for 12 years during which time he was also chairman of The Ivor Novello Awards. Osborne's early career included presenting the 1960s radio show Cool Britania on the BBC World Service, and a stint with RCA Records in its A&R department.

== Career ==
Born in London in 1949, Osborne is the son of the late musical director Tony Osborne. He was educated in Switzerland and entered the music industry at the age of 15. Timi Yuro, Nana Mouskouri and Val Doonican made recordings of songs by the teenage Osborne, and at the age of 17 he had his first US chart entry with "On The Other Side" by The Seekers, which he wrote with Tom Springfield. Osborne was influenced by lyricist/producer Norman Newell whom he knew via family connections in his youth. In the early 1970s he was active in television jingles, writing and performing hundreds of songs for brands including Pepsi, Ultra Brite, Shredded Wheat and Abbey National.

Osborne recorded two albums together with Paul Vigrass; these were both produced by Jeff Wayne. The first is Queues in 1972, which contains the hits "Forever Autumn", "Men of Learning" and "Virginia (Be Strong)"; the second is Steppin' Out, with the hit "Gypsy Woman". "Men of Learning" peaked at No. 84 in Australia in 1972. The duo did release a belated UK single in 1975 (also produced by Wayne) on CBS 3170 with "Take it Away" on the A-side and "Hangin' in, Hangin' Out" (co-written by the duo and Wayne) on the B-side.

Osborne went on to collaborate with Elton John throughout the 1978 album A Single Man, and on parts of the albums 21 at 33, The Fox, Jump Up! and Leather Jackets. The three biggest singles co-written by Elton John and Osborne were "Part-Time Love" from 1978, "Little Jeannie", a U.S. million-seller in 1980, and the worldwide hit "Blue Eyes" from 1982. Osborne was the principal lyricist on the best-selling concept album Jeff Wayne's Musical Version of The War of the Worlds which has sold in excess of 15 million albums and performed half a dozen sold-out UK arena tours as well as touring in Europe and Australia.

Osborne's collaboration with Richard Kerr yielded the US hit "I'm Dreaming" for Jennifer Warnes and "Making The Best of a Bad Situation" for Millie Jackson's Still Caught Up album, as well as cuts by Jimmy Helms, Cliff Richard, Peter Cetera, The Edwin Hawkins Singers and The Righteous Brothers. He co-wrote four songs for Albert Hammond's album Somewhere in America (1982).

"I Am the Future", written with Lalo Schifrin for the soundtrack of the movie Class of 1984, was performed by Alice Cooper. Other films featuring Osborne songs include My Own Private Idaho, Stardust, Every Day's a Holiday, Summer Lovers, The Legacy and Oh! Heavenly Dog.

In 1986, a demo tape containing a song co-written by Osborne ("Wars of the Roses") found its way to the BBC, which suggested it be shortlisted for the Song For Europe final that year; Osborne recruited a band, including his then-fiancée (and later wife) Lorna Bannon, which was named The Future, and was "hotly tipped" to win. However the regional juries placed the song last.

Osborne's credits as a backing vocalist include "Sugar Baby Love" by The Rubettes, "You Can Make Me Dance" by Rod Stewart and The Faces, and "Part-Time Love" by Elton John. More recent work includes the 2006 UK top-3 hit "Checkin' It Out" by Lil' Chris.
