= Evita (soundtrack) =

- Cover for the two-disc edition of the album

Soundtrack album by Madonna / various artists
- Released: November 12, 1996
- Recorded: 1995–1996
- Studios: Abbey Road, CTS, Metropolis, Whitfield Street (London)
- Length: 107:30 (2-disc); 77:17 (1-disc)
- Label: Warner Bros.
- Producers: Alan Parker; Andrew Lloyd Webber; David Caddick; Nigel Wright

Madonna chronology
| Something to Remember (1995) | Evita (1996) | Ray of Light (1998) |

Singles from Evita
- 1. "You Must Love Me" Released: October 21, 1996; 2. "Don't Cry for Me Argentina" Released: December 16, 1996; 3. "Another Suitcase in Another Hall" Released: March 18, 1997

Evita is the soundtrack album to the 1996 musical film of the same name, performed mostly by American singer Madonna. It was released by Warner Bros. Records on October 28, 1996, in the United Kingdom and on November 12, 1996, in the United States. Directed by Alan Parker, the film was based on Tim Rice and Andrew Lloyd Webber's 1978 musical Evita about First Lady of Argentina Eva Perón, portrayed by Madonna. The soundtrack consists of reworked songs from its original 1976 concept album as well as a new song, "You Must Love Me". Additional performers on the soundtrack include Antonio Banderas, Jonathan Pryce and Jimmy Nail.

After securing the title role in Evita, Madonna underwent vocal training in order to enhance her singing abilities. The actors were tense during the recording sessions for Evita, since they were from a non-musical background. The musical style for Evita differed from Madonna's previous works and she was not comfortable in recording her vocals inside the studio alongside the orchestra. After an emergency meeting with the principal personnel, it was decided she would record in a separate location. It took almost four months for the soundtrack to be finished. Rice and Lloyd Webber had employed the classical technique while creating the music, taking the central theme, "Don't Cry for Me Argentina", and tweaking it to cater to a variety of settings. Through the songs, the soundtrack tells the story of Eva Perón's beginnings, her rise to fame, political career and gradually her death.

The soundtrack was released in two different versions. Evita: The Complete Motion Picture Music Soundtrack, a two-disc edition that included all the tracks from the film, and Evita: Music from the Motion Picture, a single-disc edition with a selection of song highlights. Evita was promoted by the release of three singles—"You Must Love Me", "Don't Cry for Me Argentina" and "Another Suitcase in Another Hall"; the first won the Golden Globe and the Academy Award for Best Original Song in 1997. Critical reception towards the soundtrack was mixed, with AllMusic's Stephen Thomas Erlewine calling it "unengaging" while Hartford Courant's Greg Morago praised Madonna's singing abilities. Evita peaked at number two in the US Billboard 200 chart, and was certified quintuple platinum by the Recording Industry Association of America (RIAA). It topped the charts in Austria, Belgium, Czech Republic, Greece, Ireland, Scotland, Switzerland and the United Kingdom, and has sold over seven million copies worldwide.

== Background and development ==
"The hardest work that anyone had to do was obviously done by Madonna. She had the lion's share of the piece, singing as she does on almost every track. Many of the songs were comfortably within her range, but much of the score was in a range where her voice had never ventured before. Also, she was determined to sing the score as it was written and not to cheat in any way".

— Film director Alan Parker talking about working with Madonna on Evita

In 1996, Madonna starred in the film Evita, playing the role of Eva Perón, the Spiritual Leader of the Nation of Argentina. For a long time, Madonna had desired to play Eva and even wrote a letter to director Alan Parker, explaining how she would be perfect for the part. Madonna had already enlisted the help of composers Tim Rice and Andrew Lloyd Webber, who had originally created the musical Evita. Rice believed that the singer would suit in the title role since she could "act beautifully through music".

However, Lloyd Webber was still wary about Madonna's singing, so after securing the role, she undertook vocal training with coach Joan Lader. Since Evita required the actors to sing their own parts, the training helped in increasing Madonna's confidence in the songs. Lader noted that the singer "had to use her voice in a way she's never used it before. Evita is real musical theater — it's operatic, in a sense. Madonna developed an upper register that she didn't know she had." She taught Madonna how to sing using her diaphragm rather than just her throat, enabling her to project her voice in a more cohesive manner. Madonna was thrilled to find the newly discovered nuances in her voice and would go home every night, practicing by telephoning her friends and singing to them.

Parker finished writing the script for the film by May 1995. He then visited Lloyd Webber's home in France, and tried to bring him and Rice together for working on the film; the duo had not worked with each other for years after the musical Cricket (1986). While drafting the script, Parker had re-written the last act, removing the repetitive content of the original play. This resulted in Rice and Lloyd Webber composing new music, including the new song "You Must Love Me". Parker knew that the pre-recorded playback would be the main backbone for the filming, hence he was wary about the decisions he had to make in the recording studio. He pored over the script and the music, anticipating the questions he expected the actors to ask during filming.

== Recording sessions ==
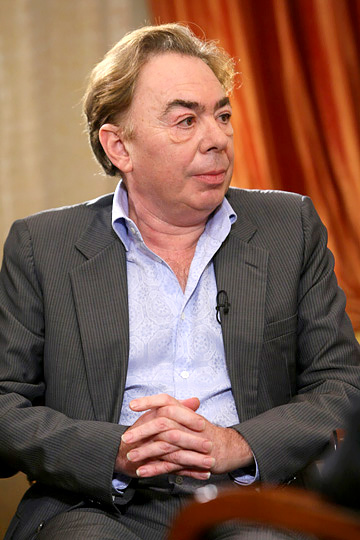
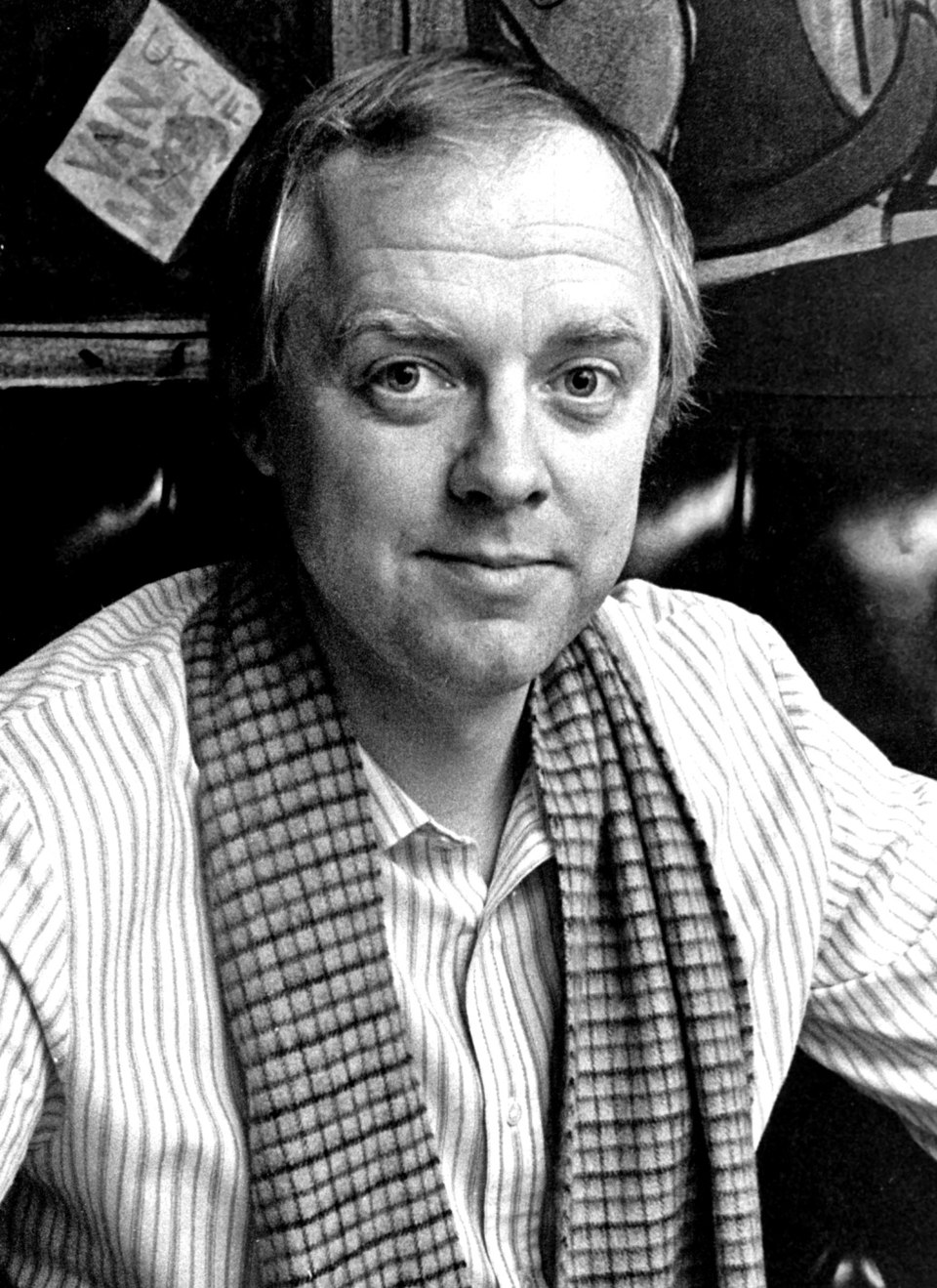
Andrew Lloyd Webber and Tim Rice composed the music of Evita, including the new song, "You Must Love Me".

Recording sessions began in October 1995, and took place at the CTS Studios in London, with Madonna and co-actors Antonio Banderas and Jonathan Pryce. Engineer David Reitzas performed the mixing of the track at Larrabee North Studios, utilizing their Solid State Logic 9000 J series consoles for the mix. For the first day's sessions, music supervisor David Caddick suggested to record "Don't Cry for Me Argentina" with the 84 piece orchestra backing Madonna's vocals. However, Lloyd Webber was critical of the recording arrangements done in the studio. The cast was also nervous. Flick noted that Banderas found the experience "scary" while Madonna was "petrified" when it came to recording the songs. "I had to sing 'Don't Cry For Me Argentina' in front of Andrew Lloyd Webber ... I was a complete mess and was sobbing afterwards. I thought I had done a terrible job", the singer recalled. Conductor John Mauceri remembered another challenge the production faced was adapting the stage numbers into a feature film; "On film, it's different than being on stage because the person on the screen in front of you is never farther than someone on the pillow in bed next to you". Parker declared the first day of recording as "Black Monday", since it was "filled with trepidation and nerves ... All of us came from very different worlds—from popular music, from movies, and from musical theater—and so we were very apprehensive".

According to producer Nigel Wright, the lead actors would first sing the numbers backed by a band and orchestra, "then they would go off with Alan and David in a more intimate recording environment and perfect their vocals". However, more trouble arose as Madonna was not comfortable with laying down a "guide vocal" simultaneously with an 84 piece orchestra inside the studio. Also, unlike her previous soundtrack releases, she had little to no control over the project; "I'm used to writing my own songs and I go into a studio, choose the musicians and say what sounds good or doesn't ... To work on 46 songs with everyone involved and not have a big say was a big adjustment", she recalled.

An emergency meeting was held between Parker, Lloyd Webber and Madonna where it was decided that the singer would record her part at Whitfield Street, a contemporary studio, while the orchestration would take place somewhere else. She also had alternate days off from the recording to save and strengthen her voice. Recording the soundtrack was a slow process and took almost four months before it was completed. But Parker noticed at the end of recording that they did not have the new song in place. Recalling in his The Making of Evita essay:

Finally, while I was visiting Andrew at his country estate in Berkshire to play him the tracks we had recorded, he suddenly sat down at the piano and played the most beautiful melody, which he suggested could be our new song. Needless to say, I grabbed it. However, we still needed lyrics and Tim dutifully began to put words to the music. The vast majority of the original Evita score had been done this way: music first, lyrics afterwards. After many weeks of nail biting, Tim was finally cajoled into writing the lyrics that now accompany the music to "You Must Love Me".

== Music and lyrical interpretation ==
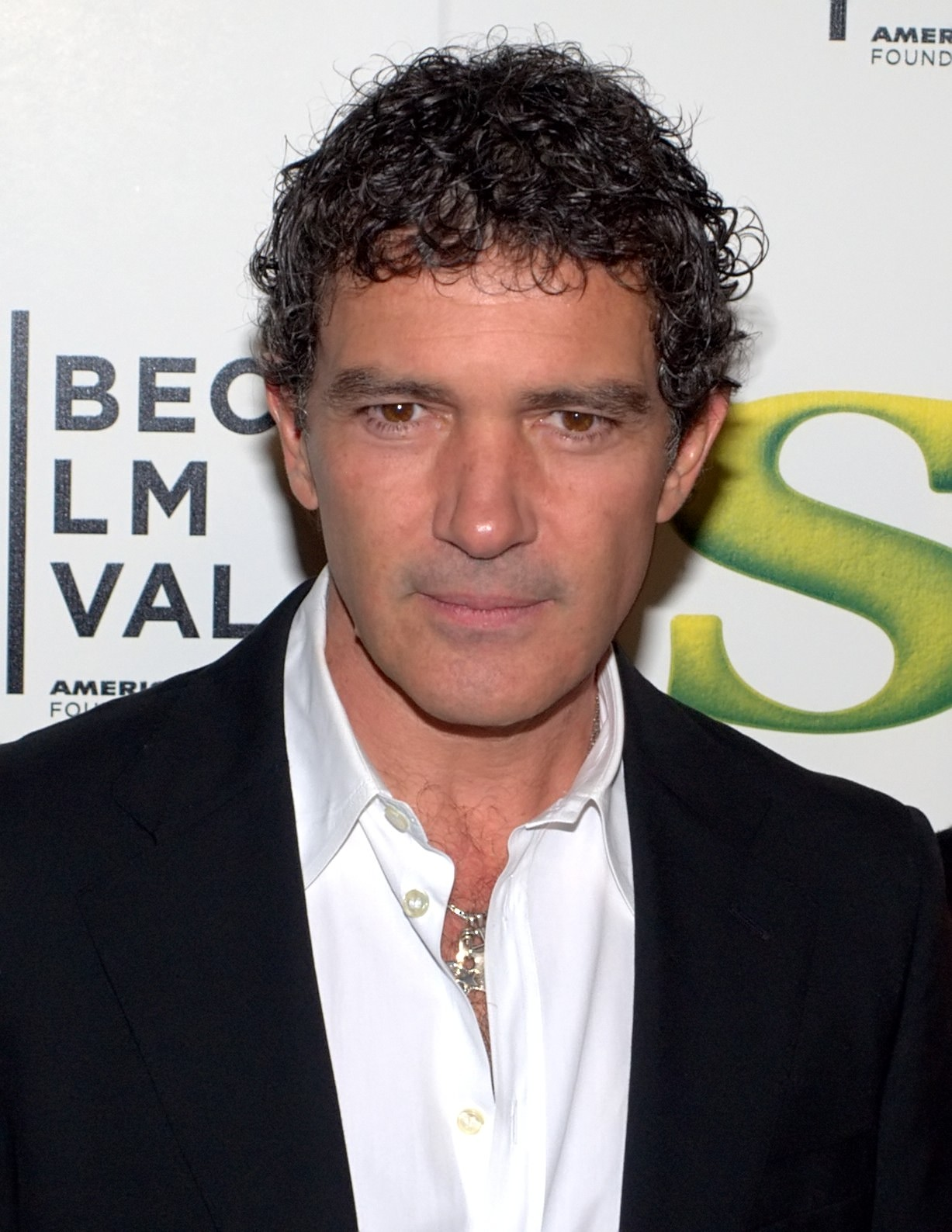
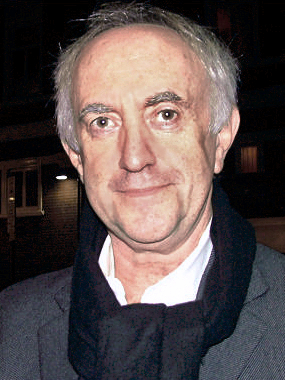
Antonio Banderas and Jonathan Pryce were the other principal vocalists on the soundtrack, besides Madonna.

The soundtrack is generally considered a Madonna album since her vocals are featured on most of the songs. Other principal vocalists include Banderas, Pryce and Jimmy Nail. Rikky Rooksby noted in The Complete Guide to the Music of Madonna that Evita was stylistically different than the music Madonna had recorded previously. The soundtrack was her most challenging endeavor since the Stephen Sondheim songs recorded for the 1990 film, Dick Tracy. Rice and Lloyd Webber employed the classical technique while creating the music, where a composer takes a central theme and adapts it to a variety of settings, keys and tempos. The central backbone and theme of the soundtrack is "Don't Cry for Me Argentina", and through the songs it tells the story of Eva's beginnings, her rise to fame, political career and gradually her death.

The soundtrack begins with the tracks "A Cinema in Buenos Aires, 26 July 1952" and "Requiem for Evita", both conducted by John Mauceri, dealing with the announcement of Eva's death. Following this "Oh What a Circus" begins, where Banderas takes the lead vocals. Built on the uptempo melody of "Don't Cry for Me Argentina", the song has rock influences and piano sounds. After a short interlude by Nail, "On This Night of a Thousand Stars", a distorted electric guitar and bass heralds "Eva and Magaldi / Eva Beware of the City". Here the lyrics talk about warning Eva from strangers in the big city. The sound of train horns, Latin percussion, drums, and light guitars introduce "Buenos Aires", talking about Eva finally arriving in the city. The melody finds Madonna singing in a higher range, and the song has a heavy composition in the middle with guitar, trumpets and discordant music. "Another Suitcase in Another Hall" begins with soft strummed guitar in broken chords, and consists of strings and acoustic guitar played in a subdued manner. Madonna sings about Eva moving from one home to another, portraying an image—the suitcase in the hall—"to express the nomadic nature of modern civilization".

In "Goodnight and Thank You", Madonna and Banderas trade verses, talking about ending Eva's love affairs, followed by Banderas' solo "The Lady's Got Potential", musing about Eva's gradual rise on the society ladder. The gentle ballad, "I'd Be Surprisingly Good for You", is about Eva meeting her husband Juan Perón; its composed of flutes, classical guitar and subdued strings. Military drum beats and a brass section start off "Peron's Latest Flame", where Banderas sings loudly about the general population disapproving of Eva. In the middle of a male backing chorus, Madonna sings her lines, accompanied by stereo tom-tom drum and synth sounds. For "A New Argentina", electric guitar and chorus form the main backbone. Composed as an "uprising hymn", Rooksby noted that Madonna's vocals sounded "aggressive and growling".

'You Must Love Me'
A 17-second clip of "You Must Love Me", with Madonna singing the chorus over the restrained piano sounds.

The second disc begins with "Don't Cry for Me Argentina", whose lyrics are described as a "string of meaningless platitudes" by Rice, adding that it worked as a speech by a "megalomaniac woman" like Eva, trying to win the favor of the people of Argentina. The composition consists of pizzicato strings, and the song jumps from being light to heavy and extravagant, with one section of it being hummed by choral voices. "High Flying, Adored" has an Elton John style according to Rooksby, who described the lyrics as narcissistic and a parallel with Madonna's life. "RainBow High" features instrumentation from drums, guitars, horns and strings, with the lyrics being about Eva's materialistic needs.

With "Waltz for Eva and Che", the soundtrack's atmosphere becomes tense, as Banderas and Madonna sing on top of bass and timpani. The bittersweet song "You Must Love Me" starts with orchestra and piano. Lyrically it talks about Eva's discovery that her husband Juan had actually loved her all along, not merely seeing her as a political prop. As the song moves towards the chorus, the piano stops and the cello plays with Madonna belting out the lyrics: "Deep in my heart, I'm concealing, Things that I'm longing to say", when the piano and the orchestra come back again. It proceeds in the same way and gradually fades out. The final track, "Lament", finds Madonna singing in a whispered tone, about Eva looking back at her life on her deathbed. Accompanied by classical guitar and harp, Banderas also sings over Eva's grave, and the track gradually fades out as an anti-climax.

== Release and promotion ==
The soundtrack was released in the United States on November 12, 1996, almost two weeks before the release of the film. It was already in huge demand prior to its release, according to Tim Devin, manager of Tower Records. "People are seriously clamouring for it. We are getting more inquiries about this record than anything else right now," Devin explained to Billboard's Larry Flick. Warner Bros. depended on pre-release press reviews, consumer curiosity and the singles from the soundtrack to keep the interest afloat, until the album was released. Jeff Gold, VP/GM of Warner Bros. declared the release a "worldwide event" that had "ignited public interest throughout each stage of its evolution".

Evita consisted of two formats, a two-disc edition titled The Complete Motion Picture Music Soundtrack, containing all the tracks used on the film, and a single-disc edition, Music from the Motion Picture, which contained only a selection of highlights. The international release strategy of the soundtrack was similar to that of the United States, with November 25 as the date, and the single-disc edition planned for release later in December. An Evita EP, containing remixed versions of "Buenos Aires", "Don't Cry for Me Argentina" and "Another Suitcase in Another Hall", was supposed to be released but was cancelled.

=== Singles ===
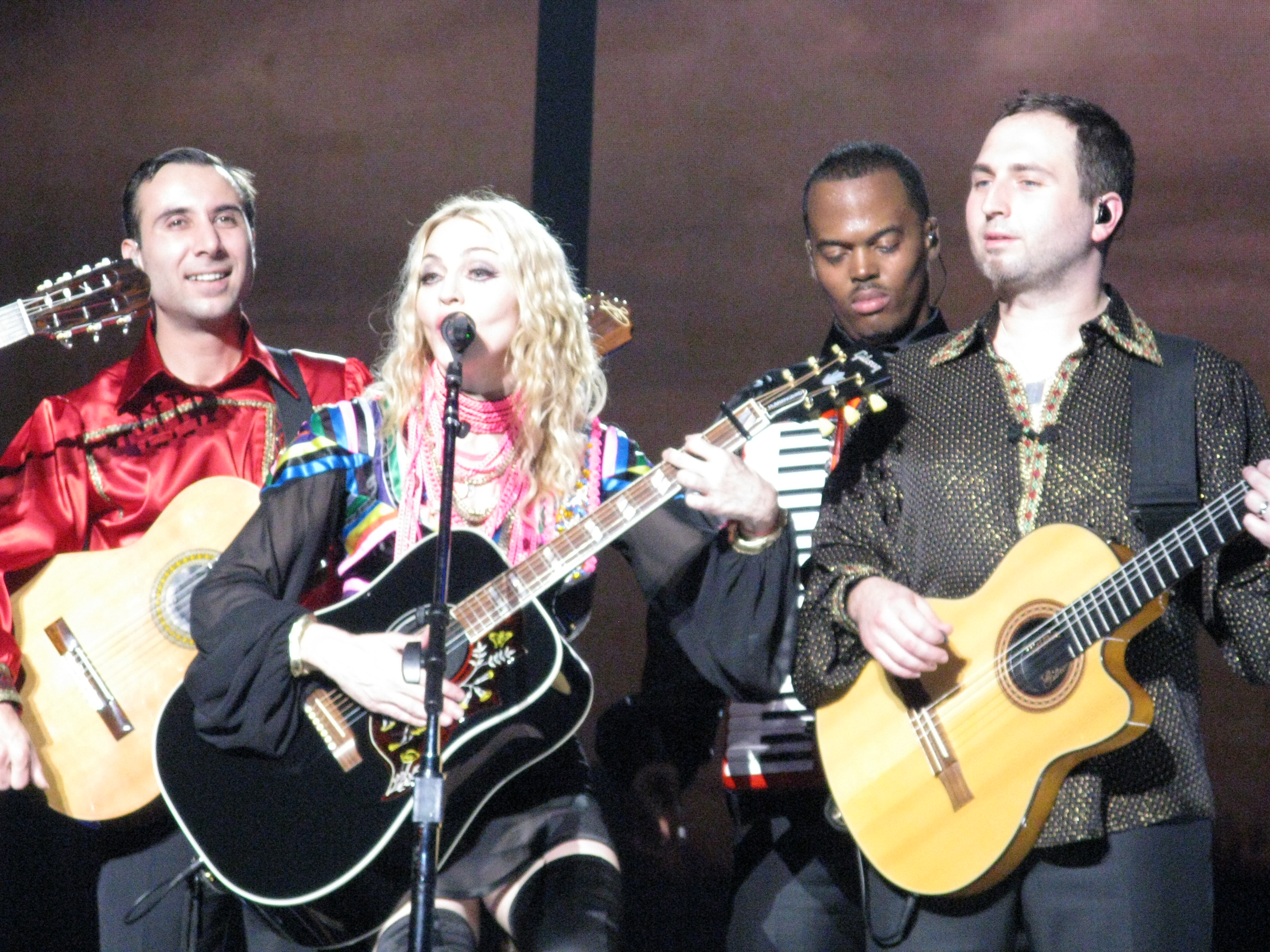
Madonna performing lead single "You Must Love Me" on the Sticky & Sweet Tour (2008–09). It went on to win the Academy Award for Best Original Song.

"You Must Love Me" was released as the soundtrack's lead single on October 21, 1996. It was written specifically for the film with the hopes of obtaining an Academy Award nomination for Best Original Song. According to Lloyd Webber, the song's main inspiration was to showcase Eva's emotional state at the time as well as her relationship with Juan. The song garnered positive responses from music critics, many of them highlighting Madonna's enhanced singing ability. It went on to win the Golden Globe and the Academy Award for Best Original Song in 1997. It was also a moderate commercial success, becoming a top-ten hit in some countries including Finland and the United Kingdom, while reaching the top-twenty in the United States, where it achieved a gold certification from the Recording Industry Association of America (RIAA).

"Don't Cry for Me Argentina" was released as the second single from the album on December 16, 1996. A separate version called the "Miami Mix", which included re-recorded vocals in English and Spanish and an Argentinean bandoneon in the song's intro, was promoted to radio. Madonna's vocals received positive critical response and the song reached the top-ten of the charts a number of nations, including the US Billboard Hot 100 chart, and received gold certifications from five of them.

"Another Suitcase in Another Hall" was the third and final single released on March 18, 1997. Upon its release, the song reached the top ten of the charts in the United Kingdom.

The track "Buenos Aires" received remix treatment from DJ duo Pablo Flores-Javier Garza. Warner Bros. was initially reluctant to release the remixes, but decided to finally release it to coincide with the home video release of Evita the film. Flores and Garza kept the Latin composition of the track, while "flattening" the groove to make it suitable for playing in dance floors. They also added live percussion and keyboard lines to the remix. Larry Flick from Billboard commented that "Buenos Aires" displayed Madonna's "increased comfort and dexterity as a stylist". Following its promotional release in October 1997, "Buenos Aires" peaked at number three on the Billboard Dance Club Songs chart.

== Critical reception ==
Contemporaneous reviews
Review scores
| Source | Rating |
|---|---|
| The Austin Chronicle | 2.5/5 stars |
| The Buffalo News | 3.5/4 stars |
| Entertainment Weekly | A |
| The Guardian | 3/5 stars |
| Los Angeles Times | 2.5/4 stars |
| Music Week | 4/4 medals |
| Rolling Stone | 2/5 stars |

Retrospective reviews and music guides
Review scores
| Source | Rating |
|---|---|
| AllMusic | 3/5 stars |
| Encyclopedia of Popular Music | 3/5 stars |
| Rolling Stone Press | 2.5/5 stars |
| The Virgin Encyclopedia of Nineties Music | 3/5 stars |

Evita has received generally mixed reviews from music critics. The staff of Music Week called the soundtrack a "well-arranged album". Anthony Violanti from The Buffalo News deemed the album a "bold move" and "sign of artistic maturity for Madonna." He noted that although she lacked musical theater experience, Madonna "displays a broad vocal range and, though it may be hard for those who remember 'Like a Virgin' to believe, an operatic sensibility." J. Randy Taraborrelli, author of Madonna: An Intimate Biography, felt that Madonna's singing sounded "supple and strong", and believed her to be not "at all out of place". Jim Farber from Entertainment Weekly praised Madonna's performance on the album, writing: "Aided by impeccable orchestrations (and some coaching), her vocals are years ahead of anything she'd sung before." Greg Kot from the Chicago Tribune wrote that "the two-CD soundtrack casts Madonna in a new light. To put it simply, the Material Girl can sing. [...] comparing her performance [on the soundtrack] to that of Patti LuPone, one comes away with a new admiration for her vocal skills. In many ways, she does more with less than her predecessor."

Authors Allen Metz and Carol Benson wrote in their book The Madonna Companion that the soundtrack gave Madonna "some of the post-disco queen/sex machine credibility she so desperately crave[d]". Spin's Annie Zaleski noted that the soundtrack demonstrated Madonna's "astronomical growth as a vocalist ...Evita marked the start of Madonna's Serious Phase, one where she balanced youthful coquettish-ness with a more mature, introspective outlook". In her review of the film, Janet Maslin from The New York Times complimented Madonna's ability to emote the songs, calling them "legitimately stellar and full of fire". Writing for the Hartford Courant, Greg Morago complimented Madonna's "remarkable understanding of the material ... While some of the numbers have lost their sharp edge ('A New Argentina' lacks requisite anger), the recording benefits from its concentration on the characters' voices. There is a vibrant, contemporary energy and fearless cinematic sweep to this welcome new stamp on the mythic life of Eva Duarte de Perón". Stefan A. Meyer, from The Herald Journal, felt that "there's a little something for everyone in Evita. It's a pop-culture clash that is sometimes quite annoying (especially in Rice's left-field rhymes) but still works like a charm".

AllMusic's Stephen Thomas Erlewine called the soundtrack "exquisitely produced and expertly rendered", but "curiously unengaging." Although he commended Madonna's singing as a "startlingly accomplished and nuanced performance", Erlewine felt that she was "trying really hard to be credible, which makes it difficult to connect with her". While reviewing the film, the San Francisco Chronicle's Octavio Roca said that the "delicious irony of Rice's lyrics remains intact, as does the freshness of Lloyd Webber's music". But Roca believed that the Latin influences present in the original songs were missing, due to John Mauceri's "languid conducting of the soundtrack, and most of all by Vincent Paterson's choreography". Barbara Shulgasser, from the same newspaper, was more negative, writing that "all of Evita's songs are slightly above Madonna's limited range. With her thin voice, she peeps out a series of mournful sounds that are painful to endure". The Baltimore Sun's J. D. Considine felt the soundtrack would disappoint the singer's fans "because Evita just isn't pop music—or, at least, not the kind of pop music Madonna usually makes on her own ... As a result, slogging through Evita is like listening to an opera written by someone who never got beyond learning how to write recitativo". Considine was also disappointed with the vocal abilities of Madonna and co-star Antonio Banderas; "they lack the power and tone to lend this intoned dialog a patina of musicality".

== Commercial performance ==
In the United States, Evita debuted at number six on the Billboard 200 chart for the issue dated November 30, 1996. It was the first entry on the chart for a "Broadway musical transitioned into film soundtrack" since Grease: The Original Soundtrack from the Motion Picture in 1978. With opening sales of 97,000 units, it also represented the largest debut for a dual soundtrack until the release of Dreamgirls in 2006. The soundtrack fell to number 28 the next week, before beginning to rise again when the film was released into theaters. Within five weeks it crept back into the top ten of the Billboard 200 and for the issue dated February 8, 1997, reached a peak of number two on the chart. This was spurred by Madonna winning the Golden Globe Award for Best Actress in a Motion Picture – Musical or Comedy. Sales increased by 17.5% to 122,000 sold for that week according to Nielsen SoundScan. It remained there for two weeks, being kept from topping the chart by No Doubt's album Tragic Kingdom, which only had an 8% sales decline to 143,000 copies.

Evita spent a total of 30 weeks on the Billboard 200, and ranked at number 26 on the year-end chart. Along with the Billboard 200, Evita reached the top of the Soundtracks Albums chart. The Recording Industry Association of America (RIAA) certified the soundtrack quintuple platinum, for shipment of 2.5 million copies across the country (or 5,000,000 "units" as the RIAA counted each disc of the double album as a separate unit). As of December 2016, the album had sold 2,025,000 copies according to Nielsen SoundScan. The single-disc edition of the soundtrack charted separately on the Billboard 200, reaching a peak of number 167.

In Canada, Evita debuted at number 27 on the RPM Top Albums/CDs chart. It reached a peak of number five on the chart, and stayed for a total of 27 weeks. The single-disc edition also charted separately, reaching a peak of number 91. In Australia, the soundtrack debuted on the ARIA Charts at number six. After fluctuating down the charts for the next few weeks, it climbed into the top-ten in March 1997, and peaked at number five. The Australian Recording Industry Association (ARIA) certified the two-disc edition as gold and the single-disc edition as platinum for shipment of 35,000 and 70,000 copies respectively. The soundtrack had a similar trajectory in New Zealand, where it peaked at number six on the albums chart, and was present for a total of 18 weeks. The Recorded Music New Zealand (RMNZ) certified it platinum, for shipment of 15,000 copies.

Evita debuted at number seven on the UK Albums Chart and ended up reaching the top of the charts in February 1997, becoming Madonna's fifth number one album in the country. It was present on the chart for a total of 44 weeks and ranked at number 23 on the year-end chart. The British Phonographic Industry (BPI) certified it double platinum for shipment of 600,000 copies. It has sold 737,000 copies as of June 2019 according to the Official Charts Company. Across Europe, Evita reached the top of the charts in Austria, Belgium (both Flanders and Wallonia), Czech Republic, Greece, Ireland, Scotland and Switzerland, as well as the top ten in Denmark, France, Germany, Netherlands, Norway, Portugal and Sweden. Its performance across the European markets resulted in the soundtrack reaching the top of the pan-European Top 100 Albums chart.

== Track listing ==
All lyrics are written by Tim Rice; all music is composed by Andrew Lloyd Webber.

Evita: The Complete Motion Picture Music Soundtrack - Disc 1
| No. | Title | Performer(s) | Length |
|---|---|---|---|
| 1. | "A Cinema in Buenos Aires, July 26, 1952" | — | 1:20 |
| 2. | "Requiem for Evita" | — | 4:16 |
| 3. | "Oh What a Circus" | Antonio Banderas; Madonna | 5:44 |
| 4. | "On This Night of a Thousand Stars" | Jimmy Nail | 2:24 |
| 5. | "Eva and Magaldi / Eva Beware of the City" | Madonna; Jimmy Nail; Antonio Banderas; Julian Littman | 5:20 |
| 6. | "Buenos Aires" | Madonna | 4:09 |
| 7. | "Another Suitcase in Another Hall" | Madonna | 3:33 |
| 8. | "Goodnight and Thank You" | Madonna; Antonio Banderas | 4:18 |
| 9. | "The Lady's Got Potential" | Antonio Banderas | 4:24 |
| 10. | "Charity Concert / The Art of the Possible" | Jimmy Nail; Jonathan Pryce; Antonio Banderas; Madonna | 2:33 |
| 11. | "I'd Be Surprisingly Good for You" | Madonna; Jonathan Pryce | 4:18 |
| 12. | "Hello and Goodbye" | Madonna; Andrea Corr; Jonathan Pryce | 1:46 |
| 13. | "Peron's Latest Flame" | Antonio Banderas; Madonna | 5:17 |
| 14. | "A New Argentina" | Madonna; Jonathan Pryce; Antonio Banderas | 8:13 |

Evita: The Complete Motion Picture Music Soundtrack - Disc 2
| No. | Title | Performer(s) | Length |
|---|---|---|---|
| 1. | "On the Balcony of the Casa Rosada (Part 1)" | Jonathan Pryce | 1:28 |
| 2. | "Don't Cry for Me Argentina" | Madonna | 5:31 |
| 3. | "On the Balcony of the Casa Rosada (Part 2)" | Madonna | 2:00 |
| 4. | "High Flying, Adored" | Antonio Banderas; Madonna | 3:32 |
| 5. | "Rainbow High" | Madonna | 2:26 |
| 6. | "Rainbow Tour" | Antonio Banderas; Gary Brooker; Peter Polycarpou; Jonathan Pryce; Madonna; John Gower | 4:50 |
| 7. | "The Actress Hasn't Learned the Lines (You'd Like to Hear)" | Madonna; Antonio Banderas | 2:31 |
| 8. | "And the Money Kept Rolling In (and Out)" | Antonio Banderas | 3:53 |
| 9. | "Partido Feminista" | Madonna | 1:40 |
| 10. | "She Is a Diamond" | Jonathan Pryce | 1:39 |
| 11. | "Santa Evita" | — | 2:30 |
| 12. | "Waltz for Eva and Che" | Madonna; Antonio Banderas | 4:31 |
| 13. | "Your Little Body's Slowly Breaking Down" | Madonna; Jonathan Pryce | 1:24 |
| 14. | "You Must Love Me" | Madonna | 2:50 |
| 15. | "Eva's Final Broadcast" | Madonna | 3:05 |
| 16. | "Latin Chant" | — | 2:11 |
| 17. | "Lament" | Madonna; Antonio Banderas | 5:17 |
| Total length: | | | 108:53 |

Evita: Music from the Motion Picture
| No. | Title | Performer(s) | Length |
|---|---|---|---|
| 1. | "Requiem for Evita" | — | 4:17 |
| 2. | "Oh What a Circus" | Antonio Banderas; Madonna | 5:44 |
| 3. | "On This Night of a Thousand Stars" | Jimmy Nail | 2:23 |
| 4. | "Eva and Magaldi / Eva Beware of the City" | Madonna; Jimmy Nail; Antonio Banderas; Julian Littman | 5:20 |
| 5. | "Buenos Aires" | Madonna | 4:08 |
| 6. | "Another Suitcase in Another Hall" | Madonna | 3:32 |
| 7. | "Goodnight and Thank You" | Madonna; Antonio Banderas | 4:17 |
| 8. | "I'd Be Surprisingly Good for You" | Madonna; Jonathan Pryce | 4:17 |
| 9. | "Peron's Latest Flame" | Antonio Banderas; Madonna | 5:17 |
| 10. | "A New Argentina" | Madonna; Jonathan Pryce; Antonio Banderas | 4:16 |
| 11. | "Don't Cry for Me Argentina" | Madonna | 5:34 |
| 12. | "High Flying, Adored" | Antonio Banderas; Madonna | 3:31 |
| 13. | "Rainbow High" | Madonna | 2:27 |
| 14. | "And the Money Kept Rolling In (and Out)" | Antonio Banderas | 3:47 |
| 15. | "She Is a Diamond" | Jonathan Pryce | 1:39 |
| 16. | "Waltz for Eva and Che" | Madonna; Antonio Banderas | 4:12 |
| 17. | "You Must Love Me" | Madonna | 2:50 |
| 18. | "Eva's Final Broadcast / Latin Chant" | Madonna | 5:15 |
| 19. | "Lament" | Madonna; Antonio Banderas | 4:10 |
| Total length: | | | 77:17 |

== Personnel ==
Credits and personnel adapted from the 2-CD edition of the soundtrack's liner notes.

=== Musicians ===
- Madonna – principal artist, vocals
- Antonio Banderas – principal artist, vocals
- Jonathan Pryce – principal artist, vocals
- Jimmy Nail – principal artist, vocals
- Andrea Corr – vocals
- Julian Littman – vocals, backing vocals
- Gary Brooker – vocals
- Peter Polycarpou – vocals
- John Gower – vocals
- Julian Littman – vocals, backing vocals
- Gary Brooker – vocals
- Peter Polycarpou – vocals
- John Gower – vocals
- Angeline Ball – backing vocals
- Nick Holder – backing vocals
- Lorenza Johnson – backing vocals
- George Little – backing vocals
- Gordon Neville – backing vocals
- Laura Pallas – backing vocals
- Mark Ryan – backing vocals
- Alex Sharpe – backing vocals
- Linda Taylor – backing vocals
- Fredrick Warder – backing vocals
- Andrew Wood-Mitchell – backing vocals
- Julia Worsley – backing vocals
- Andrew Lloyd Webber – orchestration
- David Caddick – conductor
- Nick Curtis – conductor
- Michael Dixon – conductor
- John Mauceri – conductor
- David Cullen – orchestration

=== Technical ===
- Nigel Wright – record producer, audio mixing
- Alan Parker – record producer
- Andrew Lloyd Webber – record producer
- David Caddick – record producer
- Lawrence Dermer – record producer
- Madonna – audio mixing
- Dave Reitzas – engineer, audio mixing
- Dick Lewzey – engineer
- Robin Sellars – engineer
- Mark "Spike" Stent – engineer
- Jake Davies – assistant engineer
- Lee McCutcheon – assistant engineer
- Gustavo Moratorio – assistant engineer
- Matt Silva – assistant engineer
- Dave Wagg – assistant engineer
- Toby Wood – assistant engineer
- Dave Collins – mastering
- Mark Graham – music copyist
- Nick Mera – music copyist
- David Appleby – photography

== Charts ==
=== Weekly charts ===
1996–1997 weekly chart performance for Evita
| Chart (1996–1997) | Peak position |
|---|---|
| Argentine Albums (CAPIF) | 6 |
| Australian Albums (ARIA) | 5 |
| Australian Albums (ARIA) Two-disc edition | 35 |
| Austrian Albums (Ö3 Austria) | 1 |
| Belgian Albums (Ultratop Flanders) | 1 |
| Belgian Albums (Ultratop Wallonia) | 1 |
| Canada Top Albums/CDs (RPM) | 5 |
| Canada Top Albums/CDs (RPM) Single-disc edition | 91 |
| Czech Albums (IFPI CR) | 1 |
| Danish Albums (Tracklisten) | 4 |
| Dutch Albums (Album Top 100) | 6 |
| Estonian Albums (Eesti Top 10) | 1 |
| Europe (European Top 100 Albums) | 1 |
| Finnish Albums (Suomen virallinen lista) | 17 |
| French Albums (SNEP) | 2 |
| German Albums (Offizielle Top 100) | 2 |
| Greek Albums (IFPI Greece) | 1 |
| Hungarian Albums (MAHASZ) | 2 |
| Italian Albums (FIMI) | 2 |
| Irish Albums (IFPI Ireland) | 1 |
| Japanese Albums (Oricon) | 21 |
| Malaysian Albums (RIM) | 4 |
| New Zealand Albums (RMNZ) | 6 |
| Norwegian Albums (VG-lista) | 3 |
| Portuguese Albums (AFP) | 4 |
| Scottish Albums (Official Charts) | 1 |
| Singapore Albums (SPVA) | 2 |
| Spanish Albums (PROMUSICAE) | 16 |
| Swedish Albums (Sverigetopplistan) | 5 |
| Swiss Albums (Schweizer Hitparade) | 1 |
| Taiwan International Albums (IFPI) | 2 |
| UK Albums (Official Charts) | 1 |
| US Billboard 200 | 2 |
| US Billboard 200 Single-disc edition | 167 |
| US Soundtrack Albums (Billboard) | 1 |
| Uruguayan Albums (CUD) | 5 |

2003 weekly chart performance for Evita
| Chart (2003) | Peak position |
|---|---|
| UK Soundtrack Albums (Official Charts) | 3 |

=== Year-end charts ===
1996 year-end chart performance for Evita
| Chart (1996) | Position |
|---|---|
| Australian Albums (ARIA) | 86 |
| UK Albums (OCC) | 45 |

1997 year-end chart performance for Evita
| Chart (1997) | Position |
|---|---|
| Australian Albums (ARIA) | 49 |
| Austrian Albums (Ö3 Austria) | 4 |
| Canadian Albums (SoundScan) | 65 |
| Danish Albums (Hitlisten) | 15 |
| Dutch Albums (MegaCharts) | 27 |
| European Top 100 Albums (Music & Media) | 6 |
| German Albums (Offizielle Top 100) | 13 |
| New Zealand Albums (RMNZ) | 40 |
| Norwegian Winter Albums (VG-lista) | 4 |
| Swedish Albums (Sverigetopplistan) | 89 |
| Swiss Albums (Schweizer Hitparade) | 12 |
| UK Albums (OCC) | 23 |
| US Billboard 200 | 26 |
| US Soundtrack Albums (Billboard) | 5 |

== Certifications and sales ==
Certifications and sales for Evita
| Region | Certification | Certified units/sales |
|---|---|---|
| Argentina (CAPIF) | Gold | 30,000^{^} |
| Australia (ARIA) | Platinum | 70,000^{^} |
| Australia (ARIA) Two-disc edition | Gold | 35,000^{^} |
| Austria (IFPI Austria) | 2× Platinum | 100,000^{*} |
| Belgium (BRMA) | Platinum | 50,000^{*} |
| Brazil (Pro-Música Brasil) | Gold | 100,000^{*} |
| Canada | — | 200,000 |
| Germany (BVMI) | Platinum | 500,000^{^} |
| Hong Kong (IFPI Hong Kong) | Platinum | 20,000^{*} |
| Israel | — | 20,000 |
| Japan (RIAJ) | Gold | 124,470 |
| Netherlands (NVPI) | Gold | 50,000^{^} |
| New Zealand (RMNZ) | Platinum | 15,000^{^} |
| Norway (IFPI Norway) | Gold | 25,000^{*} |
| Poland (ZPAV) | Gold | 50,000^{*} |
| Portugal 1997 sales | — | 40,000 |
| Singapore | — | 20,000 (Note: First two-weeks sales for Evita in Singapore.) |
| South Africa 1997 sales | — | 50,000 |
| South Korea | — | 100,000 (Note: South Korean sales as of February 1997.) |
| Spain (Promusicae) | Gold | 50,000^{^} |
| Switzerland (IFPI Switzerland) | Platinum | 50,000^{^} |
| United Kingdom (BPI) | 2× Platinum | 737,000 |
| United States (RIAA) | 5× Platinum | 2,500,000 (Note: The Recording Industry Association of America considers double CD as two different units, resulting in the quintuple platinum certification for shipments of 2.5 million copies. As of December 2016, the album has sold 2,025,000 copies in the United States.) |
Summaries
| Europe (IFPI) | 2× Platinum | 2,000,000^{*} |
| Worldwide | — | 7,000,000 |
^{*} Sales figures based on certification alone.^{^} Shipments figures based on certification alone.

== See also ==
- List of European number-one hits of 1997
- List of number-one hits of the 1990s (Switzerland)
- List of Scottish number ones of 1997
- List of UK Albums Chart number ones of the 1990s
- List of best-selling albums in Austria

== Bibliography ==
- Citron, Stephen (2001). Stephen Sondheim and Andrew Lloyd Webber: The New Musical. Oxford University Press. ISBN 978-0-19-509601-9.
- Metz, Allen; Benson, Carol (1999). The Madonna Companion: Two Decades of Commentary. Music Sales Group. ISBN 0-8256-7194-9.
- Michael, Mick St. (2004). Madonna 'Talking': Madonna in Her Own Words. Omnibus Press. ISBN 1-84449-418-7.
- Morton, Andrew (2002). Madonna. Macmillan Publishers. ISBN 0-312-98310-7.
- O'Brien, Lucy (2008). Madonna: Like an Icon. Bantam Press. ISBN 978-0-552-15361-4.
- Rice, Time (2012). Oh, What a Circus. Hachette UK. ISBN 978-1-4447-6217-4.
- Rooksby, Rikky (2004). The Complete Guide to the Music of Madonna. Omnibus Press. ISBN 0-7119-9883-3.
- Ryan, Gavin (2011). Australia's Music Charts 1988–2010. Mt. Martha, VIC, Australia: Moonlight Publishing.
- Salaverri, Fernando (2005). Sólo éxitos: año a año, 1959–2002. Spain: Fundación Autor-SGAE. ISBN 84-8048-639-2.
- Scapolo, Dean (2007). The Complete New Zealand Music Charts 1966–2006: singles, albums, DVDs, compilations (Illustrated ed.). Wellington, N.Z: Maurienne House. ISBN 978-1-877443-00-8.
- Taraborrelli, Randy J. (2008). Madonna: An Intimate Biography. London: Pan, Simon and Schuster. ISBN 978-0-330-45446-9.
