= Centre Stage (album) =

Studio album by Kimberley Walsh
- Released: 4 February 2013
- Recorded: September 2012
- Studio: Stockholm, Sweden
- Genre: Theatrical pop
- Length: 43:05
- Label: Decca
- Producer: Per Magnusson; David Kreuger

Singles from Centre Stage
- 1. "One Day I'll Fly Away" Released: 4 January 2013

Centre Stage is the debut studio album from British pop singer Kimberley Walsh, released on 4 February 2013 through Decca Records. The album is Walsh's first solo music release outside of British girl group Girls Aloud after working in acting, television presenting, and theatre. It consists of covers of songs from popular musical theatre and musical films, a passion which Walsh has wished to pursue since she was just three years old, as well as two brand new songs. Centre Stage also features duets with fellow performers Louise Dearman and Ronan Keating.

== Background and development ==
In 2007, for the filming of the ITV2 series The Passions of Girls Aloud, Walsh set forth to achieve her lifelong dream of appearing in a West End production. She met with a vocal coach to practice using her upper register, which she had not used for years. Walsh auditioned for Les Misérables, and explained that "the audition was scary because I haven’t auditioned since Popstars: The Rivals. It was frightening." In 2009, Girls Aloud announced they would take a year-long hiatus to pursue solo projects, but would reunite for a new studio album in 2010. Walsh made her first foray into a solo music career when she appeared on the Aggro Santos song "Like U Like" in 2011. In October 2011, Walsh made her West End theatre debut, playing Princess Fiona in the London production of Shrek the Musical. The announcement came after Amanda Holden announced her pregnancy in August 2011.

Following her solo endeavours and musical theatre performances, Walsh decided to record a studio album featuring her own renditions of popular hits from musicals, commenting that "I've always loved musical theatre and doing Shrek the Musical definitely reignited the passion in me." For the album, Walsh commented that she wanted "to share the love I have for musical theatre by taking some classic songs and completely reinventing them. The melodies in so many musical songs are so brilliant, I knew we could create something special by experimenting with the production, and I really feel like we've come up with some interesting takes on classic songs." Most of the tracks were recorded in Stockholm, Sweden in September 2012. The singer stated, "I was in my absolute element recording it and really felt like I was discovering new tones to my voice and really pushing myself vocally. I loved every minute of recording this album. I really felt like I was going back to my roots." Walsh revealed that the concept of the album and its artwork is "that whole story of a performer, and all the stories you have to go through to get to that point of being on the stage." Art director Stephen Kennedy explained, "As the day unfolds she becomes a star and takes centre stage." The album's cover art features "a glamorous 40s-inspired look" that echoes "old Hollywood".

== Critical reception ==
Professional ratings
Review scores
Source	Rating
Digital Spy	2/5 stars
Express.co.uk	2/5 stars
The Independent	2/5 stars
The Press	4/5 stars
Red	mixed
Virgin Media	3/5 stars

Centre Stage has received generally mixed reviews from contemporary music critics. Lewis Corner of Digital Spy said that "One Day I'll Fly Away" is "one of a few re-imaginings that successfully makes the transition from stage to pop" on Centre Stage, also praising the renditions of "Defying Gravity" and "As Long As He Needs Me". However, Corner criticized Walsh's lack of emotions in tracks such as "On My Own" and "Somewhere", concluding his review by saying that the album "is a worthy addition to any Girls Aloud fanatic's collection, but not enough to turn the heads of the casual music peruser." Writing for Express.co.uk, Charlotte Heathcote stated that Walsh doesn't have enough charisma to sing songs in the style of "Memory" and "One Day I'll Fly Away", adding that the production is not "sharp enough to redeem a record that’s oddly mature coming from a 31-year-old."

Hannah Dunn of British magazine Red wrote that Centre Stage is a departure from Walsh's sound with Girls Aloud, which she thought it was "certainly a brave move," stating that "while die-hard musical fans may be a little disappointed to see their favourite show tunes tampered with, Girls Aloud fans will still love Kimberley's first solo venture." Andy Gill of The Independent commented that "One Day I'll Fly Away" was a good effort, and that "Hushabye Mountain" was the best song on the album, but thought that the other tracks weren't strong enough for the singer. Ian Sime of The Press stated that Walsh "firmly places her own stamp on some of the best-loved songs from the musicals", concluding that the album will establish her as "one of the leading ladies of the theatre for her generation." Virgin Media reviewer Matthew Horton said that it was obvious that Walsh put her heart and soul on the album, writing that the singer "shows off an emotional range and sincerity perfect for the musicals."

== Release and promotion ==
On 5 November 2012, Walsh revealed that Centre Stage would be released by Decca Records on 4 February 2013, following her appearance on series ten of Strictly Come Dancing and ahead of Girls Aloud's Ten - The Hits Tour 2013. In addition to the standard edition, a deluxe edition, featuring another original track, "Fly", as well as an orchestral version of "Like You Like" and previously recorded covers of "Everybody Dance" and "One Vision", will also be released. The iTunes Store deluxe edition features the Alias Club Mix of "One Day I'll Fly Away" and three more tracks, including an acoustic rendition of "Tomorrow". On 12 December 2012, Walsh unveiled a behind-the-scenes video of her shooting the cover for the album, accompanied by audio of her singing "Another Suitcase in Another Hall" from Evita. 90-second previews of the album tracks were made available on iTunes on 18 December 2012. In January 2013, Walsh was the cover of Cosmopolitan and Fabulous to promote the release of her solo material. It was also reported by leading Swedish tabloid newspaper Aftonbladet that Walsh had been selected to represent the United Kingdom in Eurovision Song Contest 2013 with the song "You First Love Me". On 19 January 2013, the singer also made an appearance at The Jonathan Ross Show, and she also visited The Matt Edmondson Show on BBC Radio 1 the following day. On 23 January 2013, Walsh performed "One Day I'll Fly Away" at the National Television Awards, and on 2 February 2013 she performed songs from Centre Stage at G.A.Y. Three days later, the singer appeared at BBC Breakfast, and recorded an interview with Real Radio North West, which was broadcast on 8 February 2013 at 7:45 AM GMT. Walsh was also interviewed at Loose Women on 7 February 2013, and she performed "Somewhere" at ITV's This Morning on 13 February 2013. On the first episode of Let's Dance for Comic Relief series 5, the singer performed "Defying Gravity".

=== Singles ===
On 21 December 2012, "One Day I'll Fly Away" premiered in full through the label's official SoundCloud account. The track was officially released on 4 January 2013 as the first single from the album. The accompanying music video premiered on 17 January 2013. It features Walsh performing the song in different settings, until she is joined by Pasha Kovalev and they perform a ballet number.

== Track listing ==
Standard edition
No.	Title	Writer(s)	Musical	Length
1.	"One Day I'll Fly Away"	Joe Sample; Will Jennings	Moulin Rouge!	3:43
2.	"On My Own"	Claude-Michel Schönberg; Herbert Kretzmer	Les Misérables	3:31
3.	"Somewhere"	Leonard Bernstein; Stephen Sondheim	West Side Story	3:02
4.	"Falling Slowly" (featuring Ronan Keating)	Glen Hansard; Markéta Irglová	Once	4:05
5.	"Memory"	Trevor Nunn; Andrew Lloyd Webber	Cats	4:22
6.	"Defying Gravity"	Stephen Schwartz	Wicked	3:40
7.	"I Still Believe" (featuring Louise Dearman)	Alain Boublil; Richard Maltby, Jr.; Claude-Michel Schönberg	Miss Saigon	4:17
8.	"Dreams Can Learn to Fly"	Fredrik Kempe; Per Magnusson; David Kreuger; Sharon Vaughn	Original	3:27
9.	"Another Suitcase in Another Hall"	Tim Rice; Lloyd Webber	Evita	3:35
10.	"Hushabye Mountain"	Robert Sherman; Richard Sherman	Chitty Chitty Bang Bang	3:14
11.	"As Long as He Needs Me"	Lionel Bart	Oliver!	2:56
12.	"You First Loved Me"	Kempe; Magnusson; Kreuger; Vaughn	Original	3:11

Digital deluxe edition bonus tracks
No.	Title	Writer(s)	Musical	Length
13.	"One Day I'll Fly Away" (The Alias Club Mix)	Joe Sample; Will Jennings	Moulin Rouge!	6:23
14.	"Easy Terms"	Willy Russell	Blood Brothers	3:01
15.	"Someone to Watch Over Me"	George Gershwin; Ira Gershwin	Oh, Kay!	3:19
16.	"Tomorrow"	Charles Strouse; Martin Charnin	Annie	1:39

== Chart performance ==
Chart (2013)	Peak position
Irish Albums (IRMA)	99
Scottish Albums Chart	23
UK Albums Chart	18
UK Digital Albums Chart	39

== Release history ==
Region	Date	Format	Label
Ireland	1 February 2013	CD, digital download	Decca
United Kingdom	4 February 2013	CD, digital download	Decca
Brazil	4 February 2013	Digital download	Decca
