= Don't Cry for Me Argentina =

1976 single by Julie Covington

Single by Julie Covington

from the album Evita
- B-side: "Rainbow High"
- Released: 12 November 1976
- Recorded: 1976
- Genre: Pop
- Length: 5:27
- Label: MCA
- Composer: Andrew Lloyd Webber
- Lyricist: Tim Rice
- Producers: Lloyd Webber; Rice; David Land

Julie Covington singles chronology
"Two Worlds Apart" (1973)	"Don't Cry for Me Argentina" (1976)	"Only Women Bleed" (1977)

"Don't Cry for Me Argentina" is a song recorded by Julie Covington for the 1976 concept album Evita, later included in the 1978 musical of the same name. The song was written and composed by Andrew Lloyd Webber and Tim Rice while they were researching the life of Argentine first lady Eva Perón. It appears at the opening of the first and second acts, as well as near the end of the show, initially as the spirit of the dead Eva exhorting the people of Argentina not to mourn her, during Eva's speech from the balcony of the Casa Rosada, and during her final broadcast.

The Evita album took three to four months to record, for Rice was not satisfied with the intensity of the initial recordings. The song had a number of different titles before "Don't Cry for Me Argentina" was chosen as the final one. The song shares its melody with "Oh What a Circus" from the same show and lyrically consists of platitudes where Eva tries to win the favour of the people of Argentina. It was released in the United Kingdom on 12 November 1976 as the first single from the album, accompanied by national and trade advertising, full-colour posters, display sleeves as well as radio interviews.

The song reached number one on the UK Singles Chart and earned a gold certification from the British Phonographic Industry (BPI), with over a million copies sold. It also reached the top of the charts in Australia, Belgium, Ireland, New Zealand and the Netherlands. "Don't Cry for Me Argentina" was critically appreciated, with Rice and Lloyd Webber winning the 1977 Ivor Novello award in the category of Best Song Musically and Lyrically. When Evita moved to a London theatre, Covington – who had become disenchanted with the whole project – refused to reprise the part of Eva, and the role went to Elaine Paige. "Don't Cry for Me Argentina" has been covered by multiple artists, including David Essex, The Carpenters, Olivia Newton-John, and Sinéad O'Connor as well as actors Lea Michele and Chris Colfer from the TV series Glee‍.

In 1996, American singer Madonna played the title role in the film adaptation of the musical and recorded her rendition of "Don't Cry for Me Argentina". Released as the second single from the film soundtrack on 16 December 1996, her version received positive reviews from music critics who praised her vocal performance. A separate version called the "Miami Mix", which included re-recorded vocals in English and Spanish and an Argentinian bandoneon, was promoted to radio. Madonna's version reached number one on the European Hot 100 Singles chart and the national charts of the Czech Republic, France, Hungary, and Spain. It also became a top-ten hit on the US Billboard Hot 100 and many other charts worldwide, while attaining gold or platinum in six countries.

== Background and development ==
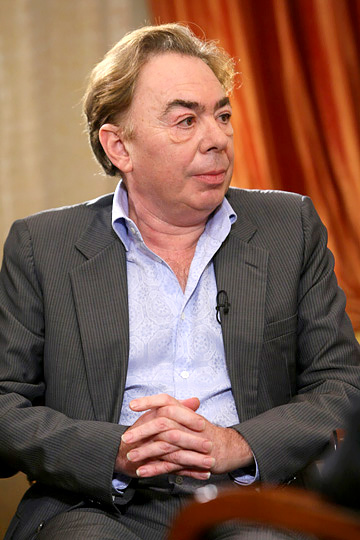
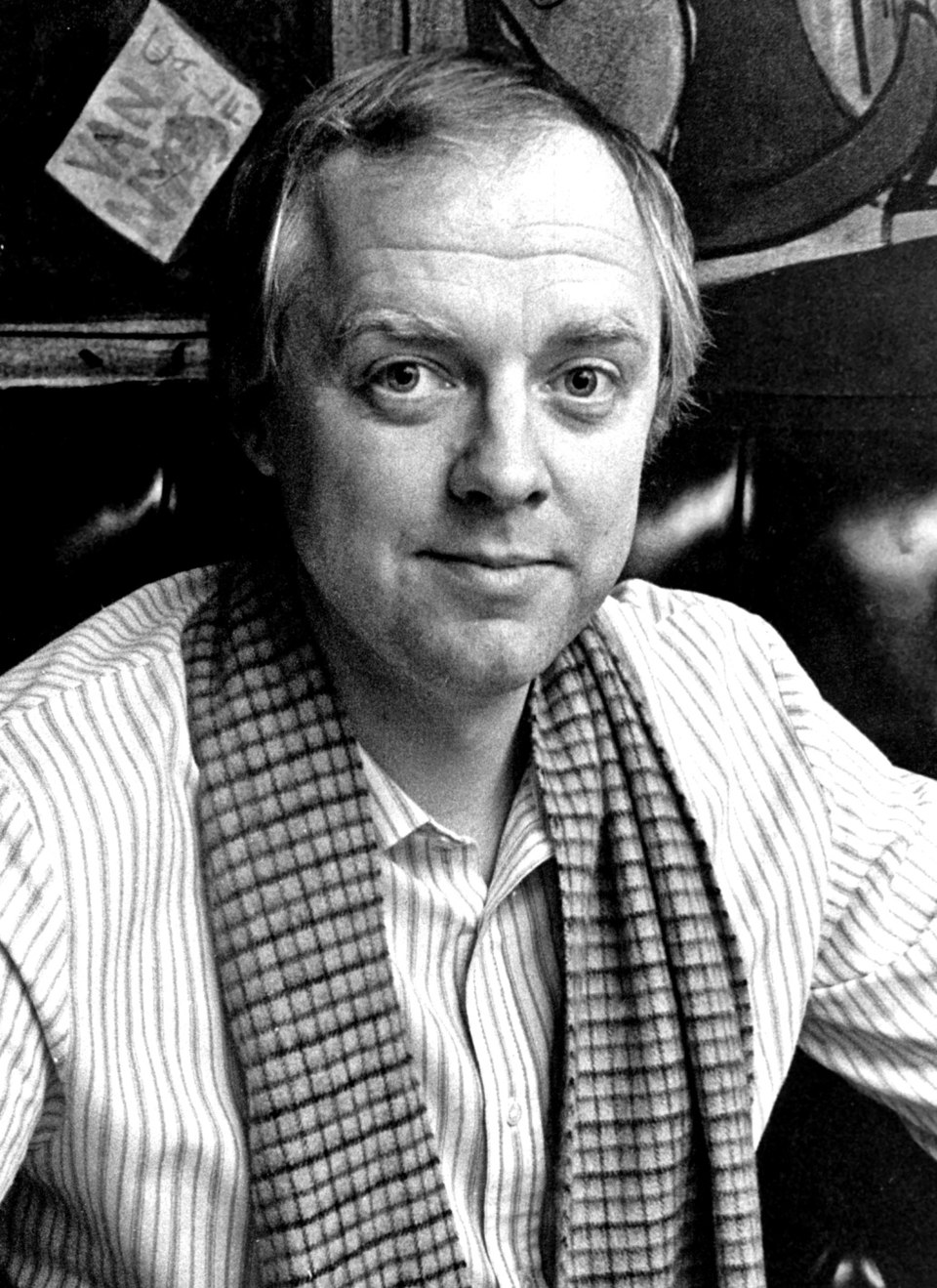
Co-writers of "Don't Cry for Me Argentina", Andrew Lloyd Webber and Tim Rice.

"Don't Cry for Me Argentina" was written by Andrew Lloyd Webber and Tim Rice while they were developing Evita in 1976. Both were extremely intrigued by the stories surrounding the life of Eva Perón while researching her during the mid-1970s. Evita was initially produced as an album, before being adapted for the stage, following a formula that Lloyd Webber and Rice had employed during the production of Jesus Christ Superstar, their previous musical. The duo had written the songs for a female singer with good vocals.

Rice and Lloyd Webber's research showed that Eva had not in reality delivered any major oration on the day of her husband Juan Perón's inauguration ceremony, but not long after becoming Argentina's new First Lady, she started making highly emotional speeches, the intensity of which they wanted to capture with "Don't Cry for Me Argentina". The song was composed to appear at the opening and near the end of the show, initially as the spirit of the dead Eva exhorting the people of Argentina not to mourn her, and finally during Eva's speech from the balcony of Casa Rosada. Its melody is similar to the opening song of the musical, "Oh What a Circus", which puts emphasis on Eva's funeral. As "Oh What a Circus" ended with the character Che's sarcastic questioning of the mourning behind Eva's death, "Don't Cry for Me Argentina" started with only few lines being sung, while the rest of the song was reserved for the finale.

After the song was composed, Lloyd Webber and Rice were struggling to find a suitable musical actress for the songs and the title role; the only one they knew, Yvonne Elliman, had moved to the United States. One day they were watching the British musical television show Rock Follies, in which they noticed actress and singer Julie Covington, who was playing an aspiring rock musician. Covington had played in London musicals like Godspell, and her acting abilities in Rock Follies convinced Rice and Lloyd Webber to sign her for Evita.

Covington was extremely intrigued by their proposal, considering Eva Perón to be a non-commercial idea for a musical. Nevertheless, she thought that the songs were great compositions and signed on for recording them. Lloyd Webber and Rice immediately started recording, and the first demos were those of "Don't Cry for Me Argentina", "I'd Be Surprisingly Good for You" and "Buenos Aires", with just piano as an accompaniment. They moved on to sign a deal with MCA Records, to release an album based on the songs – though with extremely poor royalty rates, for the record company executives did not expect the album to be a success. In the meantime, singers for all the other roles of the musical were also signed, and the cast moved to Olympic Studios in 1975 to start recording.

== Recording and composition ==
Personnel working on the Evita album included recording engineer David Hamilton-Smith, Simon Philips on drums, Mo Foster on bass, Joe Moretti and Ray Russell on guitars and Anne Odell on keyboards. David Snell played the harp and Anthony Bowles conducted the London Philharmonic Orchestra, while another choir called the London Boy Singles was directed by Alan Doggett. Members of The Grease Band, including bassist Alan Spenner and rhythm guitarist Neil Hubbard, also played on the album. It took a total of 3–4 months to finish the recording.

"Don't Cry for Me Argentina" (1976)
A 30 second sample of Covington's recording of the song, which illustrates the pizzicato strings, and the flowing tempo introducing the opening lyrics.

The intensity which Rice looked for in the track was not immediately achieved during recording, because it is a sentimental ballad and because of its lyrics. As the delivery date of the recording approached, they got more tense since most of the album was put together. Only this song was left as they could not decide on the final title, and Rice tried out names which did not make sense within the political and dramatic atmosphere of the story. They had initially tried out various lyrics as the main hook and title of the song including "It's Only Your Lover Returning" and "All Through My Crazy and Wild Days" amid fears that mentioning Argentina would reduce the commercial appeal. Rice recalled: "What a crass decision! It was probably the only time (honest) that I had made the mistake of caring more about a lyric's potential outside the show than its importance within it, and as a result both song and show suffered." Covington had already recorded the phrase "Don't Cry for Me Argentina" for using it in the beginning of the show. Shortly before the album was finally mixed, Lloyd Webber suggested to Rice that the line also worked as the title of Eva's speech. As soon as Covington recorded with the new name, the song fitted "perfectly" into the mood of the sequence and was included in the album.

The title of the song comes from an epitaph on a plaque at Eva Perón's grave in the La Recoleta Cemetery in Buenos Aires. The plaque was presented by the city's taxi drivers' union and roughly translates as: "Don't cry for me Argentina, I remain quite near to you." Roger Ebert of the Chicago Sun-Times wrote: "For years I have wondered, during 'Don't Cry for Me, Argentina,' why we were not to cry. Now I understand: We need not cry because (a) Evita got everything out of life she dreamed of, and (b) Argentina should cry for itself. Even poor Juan Peron should shed a tear or two; he is relegated...to the status of a 'walker,' a presentable man who adorns the arm of a rich and powerful woman as a human fashion accessory." The song's lyrics are a "string of meaningless platitudes" according to Rice, who felt that it worked as an emotionally intense but empty speech by a "megalomaniac woman" trying to win the favor of the Argentines. It features the lyrics "And as for fortune, and as for fame / I never invited them in / Though it seemed to the world they were all I desired / They are illusions".

Lloyd Webber's orchestral accompaniment added a different level to the track, with its composition consisting of pizzicato strings, and its flowing tempo introducing Covington's opening vocals. The song jumps from being light to heavy and extravagant, with one section of it being hummed by choral voices. As the final lyrics – "But all you have to do is look at me to know / That every word is true" – are sung, the London Philharmonic Orchestra comes into play with a huge climax and the song ends. According to the sheet music published by Music Sales Group, the song starts with a sequence of G/D–A_{7}/D–D–Bm/D, changes to E–E/D–A/C♯–E_{7}–A–D, with the chorus featuring a chord progression of A–Bm–Dmaj_{7}–Gmaj_{7}–G–F♯m_{7}. The song is composed in the key of D♭ major with Covington's vocals spanning from the nodes of G♯_{3} to C♯_{5}. According to John Snelson the song is not only based on J.S. Bach's Prelude in C Major but also on Gounod's Ave Maria adaptation.

== Release and reception ==
"Evita was always intended to be a stage show. And 'Don't Cry for Me Argentina' was very specifically written to be a key moment in the theatre, but the fact it became a hit was incidental. I couldn't really understand how it became such a big hit. It was 6 minutes long, it had a minute instrumental by the London Symphony Orchestra and Julie Covington refused to promote it. It even went to number one in the disco chart, which I just couldn't understand. I asked a friend of mine who was a DJ, why was it so popular—he said, 'Because DJs are playing it to clear the dance floor'."

— Rice talking about the song's success to the Official Charts Company

Following the completion of the recording of the album, the Evita team switched on to full promotion of the release, with photographer Tony Snowdon shooting the promotional pictures. The single version of "Don't Cry for Me Argentina" was released in the United Kingdom on 12 November 1976, accompanied by national and trade advertising, full-colour posters, display sleeves as well as radio interviews. Another song from the musical, "Rainbow High", was listed as its B-side. MCA marketing manager Stuart Watson explained to Billboard that their chief goal was to "get an explanation of the story of Eva Perón over to the public".

The song received critical appreciation, with The Sunday Times calling it a "masterpiece". However, Rice and Lloyd Webber felt that they needed more promotion to reach the general audience who would buy the record. They had initially decided for a number of television show appearances and performances, but Covington was uninterested in the project altogether and refused to promote it further. Her reasons included wanting to perform the song with the same studio orchestra and accompaniments, and she was also against a single release from the album.

The song was never performed live on the British music show Top of the Pops, since Covington refused and whenever it was featured on the show, a montage of images of the real Eva was shown in the backdrops. However, during the week it was number one, she appeared in the audience. Rice and Lloyd Webber then targeted BBC Radio 1. The BBC had a fairly tight selection of songs they aired on their channels, and Radio 1 refused to add "Don't Cry for Me Argentina" to their playlists. Rice and Lloyd Webber panicked and were almost on the verge of releasing another track from Evita called "Another Suitcase in Another Hall", recorded by Barbara Dickson, as the second single. But Radio 1 finally relented and started playing the song due to positive response from audiences.

"Don't Cry for Me Argentina" debuted at number 37 on the UK Singles Chart on the week ending 25 December 1976. It started climbing up the chart but for 3 weeks it was kept from reaching the top spot by David Soul's "Don't Give Up on Us". On the week ending 12 February 1977, the song reached the top of the charts. It was first certified silver in January 1977, and then certified gold a month later by the British Phonographic Industry (BPI), selling almost one million physical copies in the United Kingdom. Together with digital sales since it has sold about 1.01 million copies according to the Official Charts Company.

The single also reached the top of the charts in Australia, Belgium, Ireland, New Zealand and Netherlands; in the latter country it sold around 100,000 copies. Seeing the success of the single, Rice and Lloyd Webber proceeded with promoting the song in the United States. However, the personnel at MCA Records' US office were not able to come to terms regarding how to promote the adult contemporary oriented track; it was ultimately never sent to Top 40/CHR radio, and did not appear on any US charts.

== Aftermath and impact ==
When the cast of the London musical version of Evita was being decided, Rice and Lloyd Webber naturally approached Covington to play the title role. However, she chose not to reprise the role. Producer Hal Prince wanted to cast a relatively unknown actress to play Eva, and thus Elaine Paige was signed for the part. In 1977, Rice and Lloyd Webber received the Ivor Novello award in the category of Best Song Musically and Lyrically.

During the 1982 Falklands War between the United Kingdom and Argentina, the song was sometimes played sarcastically by British regimental bands as they deployed to the Falklands. They changed the lyrics, singing it as "You don't frighten me Argentina / The truth is we will defeat you / We'll sink your carrier, with our Sea Harrier / And with our Sea Kings subs'll be sinking". At the same time the Covington recording was banned from play on the BBC. In the Philippines, the presentation of the musical was repressed during the dictatorship (1972–86) of President Ferdinand Marcos, due to the perceived similarities between the First Lady Imelda Marcos and Eva Perón. In the United States, the song is also closely linked with Patti LuPone, who performed the role of Eva in the original Broadway production of the show.

== Track listing and formats ==
- 7" single
1. "Don't Cry for Me Argentina" – 5:24
2. "Rainbow High" – 2:31
- 7" Double hit single
1. "Don't Cry for Me Argentina" – 5:23
2. "I Don't Know How to Love Him" (Performed by Yvonne Elliman) – 3:55
- 7" Old Gold single
1. "Don't Cry for Me Argentina" – 5:24
2. "Another Suitcase in Another Hall" (Performed by Barbara Dickson) – 3:00

== Credits and personnel ==
- Julie Covington – vocals
- Andrew Lloyd Webber – songwriter, record producer
- Tim Rice – songwriter, record producer
- David Land – record producer
- David Hamilton-Smith – recording engineer
- Simon Philips – drums
- Mo Foster – bass
- Joe Moretti – guitars
- Ray Russell – guitars
- Anne Odell – keyboards
- David Snell – harp
- London Philharmonic Orchestra

Credits adapted from the 7" single liner notes.

== Charts ==
=== Weekly charts ===
Weekly chart performance for "Don't Cry for Me Argentina"
Chart (1977)	Peak position
Australia (Kent Music Report)	1
Austria (Ö3 Austria Top 40)	14
Belgium (Ultratop 50 Flanders)	1
Finland (Suomen virallinen lista)	8
Ireland (IRMA)	1
Netherlands (Dutch Top 40)	1
Netherlands (Single Top 100)	1
New Zealand (Recorded Music NZ)	1
Norway (VG-lista)	10
Spain (AFE)	3
Sweden (Sverigetopplistan)	2
Switzerland (Schweizer Hitparade)	3
UK Singles (Official Charts)	1
West Germany (GfK)	4

=== Year-end charts ===
Year-end chart performance for "Don't Cry for Me Argentina"
Chart (1977)	Position
Australia (Kent Music Report)	1
Belgium (Ultratop 50 Flanders)	13
Netherlands (Dutch Top 40)	31
Netherlands (Nationale Hitparade)	21
New Zealand (RIANZ)	4
Switzerland (Schweizer Hitparade)	4
UK Singles (OCC)	3
West Germany (Media Control)	1

== Certifications ==
Certifications and sales for "Don't Cry for Me Argentina"
Region	Certification	Certified units/sales
Australia (ARIA)	Gold	50,000^{^}
France	—	100,000
Netherlands	—	100,000
United Kingdom (BPI)	Gold	1,032,296
Summaries
Worldwide	—	1,700,000
^{^} Shipments figures based on certification alone.

== Madonna version ==
"Don't Cry for Me Argentina"

Single by Madonna

from the album Evita
- B-side: "Santa Evita"; "Latin Chant"
- Released: 16 December 1996
- Recorded: 1995
- Studio: Larrabee North and CTS
- Genre: Orchestral pop
- Length: 5:34
- Label: Warner Bros.
- Songwriters: Andrew Lloyd Webber; Tim Rice
- Producers: Nigel Wright; Alan Parker; Andrew Lloyd Webber; David Caddick

Madonna singles chronology
"You Must Love Me" (1996)	"Don't Cry for Me Argentina" (1996)	"Another Suitcase in Another Hall" (1997)

Music video
- "Don't Cry for Me Argentina" on YouTube

=== Background ===
In 1996, Madonna starred in the film Evita, playing the title role. For a long time, Madonna had desired to play Eva and even wrote a letter to director Alan Parker, explaining how she would be perfect for the part. After securing the role, she underwent vocal training with coach Joan Lader since Evita required the actors to sing their own parts. Lader noted that the singer "had to use her voice in a way she's never used it before. Evita is real musical theater — it's operatic, in a sense. Madonna developed an upper register that she didn't know she had." From the moment she was signed in the film, Madonna had expressed interest in recording a dance version of "Don't Cry for Me Argentina". According to her publicist Liz Rosenberg, "since [Madonna] didn't write the music and lyrics, she wanted her signature on that song... I think on her mind, the best way to do it was go in the studio and work up a remix".

For this, in August 1996, while still mixing the film's soundtrack, Madonna hired remixers Pablo Flores and Javier Garza. According to Flores, the singer wanted something that "would be dance but faithful to the movie and to Argentina with a latin feel". Madonna herself said she wanted the remix to have a "Latin flavor and elements of Tango music". The mix was completed in two weeks at Miami and Los Angeles. Madonna had to re-record the vocals of the track in English and Spanish, while an Argentinian bandoneon was added to the song's intro. Named the "Miami Mix", it was sent to radio stations and DJs on late December 1996. The song was officially released as the soundtrack's second single on 16 December 1996 in the United Kingdom, while in the United States, the track was released on 11 February 1997. Barney Kilpatrick, VP of promotion for Warner Bros. Records, said that "the only reason this mix is being done was to accommodate Top 40 radio [...] since we have a two-disc soundtrack, we're interested in selling albums, not singles". Warner Bros wanted to create buzz for the film with the song, not the single remix. There were also talks of releasing an Evita EP, containing remixes of "Buenos Aires", "Don't Cry for Me Argentina" and "Another Suitcase in Another Hall", but it never materialized.

=== Recording and composition ===
"Don't Cry for Me Argentina" (Miami Mix)
A 30 second sample from the "Miami Mix" of Madonna's version of the song. Unlike the original, it features elements of tango and Latin music.

Recording sessions for the film's songs and soundtrack began in September 1995, and took place at the CTS Studios in London with Madonna accompanied by co-actors Antonio Banderas and Jonathan Pryce. However, trouble arose as Madonna was not completely comfortable with laying down a "guide vocal" simultaneously with an 84 piece orchestra inside the studio. She was used to singing over a pre-recorded track and not have musicians listen to her. Also, unlike her previous soundtrack releases, she had little to no control over the project; "I'm used to writing my own songs and I go into a studio, choose the musicians and say what sounds good or doesn't [...] To work on 46 songs with everyone involved and not have a big say was a big adjustment", she recalled. An emergency meeting was held between Parker, Lloyd Webber and Madonna where it was decided that the singer would record her part in a more contemporary studio while the orchestration would take place somewhere else. She also had alternate days off from the recording.

According to the singer, she was very nervous during the first day of recording. She allegedly found herself "petrified" when it came to doing the song; "I had to sing 'Don't Cry For Me Argentina' in front of Andrew Lloyd Webber [...] I was a complete mess and was sobbing afterward. I thought I had done a terrible job", she recalled. The final version recorded had many similarities to the original version by Covington, although it had a much faster pace and was created as an orchestral pop to cater to the contemporary music scene. According to the sheet music published by Musicnotes.com, Madonna's version of the song is set in common time, with a slow groove tempo of 90 beats per minute. Madonna's vocals on the song span from G_{3} to C_{5}.

=== Critical reception ===
==== Original version ====
Upon release, the song generally received positive feedback. J. D. Considine, from The Baltimore Sun, said it was one of the "big songs" from the soundtrack. Peter Keough, from the Boston Phoenix, praised Madonna's "stunning delivery" of the track. He wrote: "[Madonna] sings a softly lush soprano that captures Evita's quiet vulnerability. Her full-lipped, precise notes stride across the song's grandiose orchestrations. Webber's songs allow her all the room she needs to be many things; she succeeds at them all". Greg Kot from the Chicago Tribune, opined that "her interpretation of the show-stopper 'Don't Cry for Me Argentina' doesn't try to outreach the many previous versions, but instead brings it back to earth with a low-key dignity". Robert Christgau called it a "dismal track" and criticized its mixing. Writing for Entertainment Weekly, Chuck Arnold opined that "while credible, [Madonna's rendition] was not going to make anybody forget Patti Lupone". The Guardian's Jude Rogers wrote: "Sorry Andrew Lloyd Webber, but it's no 'Live to Tell'"; nonetheless, she praised the singer's vocal capacities. A very positive review came from the Hartford Courant's Greg Morago, who called the song "a calculated, theatrical triumph of shameless pandering and steely determination that parallels the pop diva's own rise to the top. Madonna makes this song her own; she was born to play the chignon-coiffed, diamond-studded Santa Evita". The Huffington Post's Matthew Jacobs considered it as one of Madonna's most important songs, a "stand-in for the transition from Sexy Madonna to Adult Madonna". Writing for the Los Angeles Times, David Gritten opined that "show-stoppers like 'Don't Cry for Me Argentina', which need to be belted out, sound comfortable for her".

A reviewer from Music Week rated it five out of five, calling it "a strong and fairly faithful rendition". In her review of Evita, Janet Maslin from The New York Times commented that the track was "tinglingly sung". A negative review came from NME's Alex Needham, who wrote; "by 1996 Madonna was fast turning into the pop equivalent of Sunset Boulevard's Norma Desmond, croaking, 'I'm still big! It's just the Top 40 that got small!", and that "'Don't Cry For Me Argentina' stank then, stinks now". Author Lucy O'Brien wrote in the book, Madonna: Like an Icon, that although Madonna's vocals lacked emotional complexity in the tune, she nevertheless created a "compelling" version, "right up to its grand orchestral finale". George Hatza from The Reading Eagle, said that "[Madonna] sings 'Don't Cry For Me Argentina' in a beautiful, soaring, goosebump-inducing contralto". Peter Travers from Rolling Stone, wrote: "Madonna, to her credit, puts on quite a show. She sings. She tangos [...] She even belts out 'Don't Cry for Me Argentina' to prove she's just folks". Sal Cinquemani from Slant Magazine commented: "Easily one of Madonna's greatest vocal performances to date, the singer's dramatic interpretation of Evita's unofficial theme song was both loyal and bizarrely autobiographical". Spin's Annie Zaleski wrote that the "nuanced but proud" rendition of the song "marked the start of Madonna's Serious Phase, one where she balanced youthful coquettishness with a more mature, introspective outlook". J. Randy Taraborrelli, author of Madonna: An Intimate Biography, wrote that "As Evita Perón [...] she is supple and strong, and doesn't sound at all out of place". The song was nominated for an inclusion in AFI's 100 Years...100 Songs.

==== Remix version ====
AllMusic's Jose F. Promis praised the "Miami Mix" version of the song; "['Don't Cry For Me Argentina'] was transformed into a passionate, flowing dance number", highlighting Madonna's "truly impassioned performance which infuriated musical purists but delighted her fans and public alike". In 2017, Billboard ranked the "Miami Mix" as the 95th greatest pop song of 1997; Andrew Unterberger wrote that the remix "is just as responsible for the song's chart success as Madonna's Celine Dion vocal ambitions, taking the song from the balcony to the dance floor and giving it back to the people". In 2018, the same magazine called the remix "a weirdly enjoyable menage à trois between Broadway, Latin and club music, with a pounding beat and lively tango that flourishes with Madonna's earnest delivery".

=== Chart performance ===
In the United States, the popularity of the "Miami Mix" version of the song enabled it to become the song with the most radio adds, and jumped to number 18 on the Hot 100 Airplay chart. Demand for the song continued to increase forcing Warner Bros. to release the CD single, and the song becoming eligible to chart. It debuted on the Billboard Hot 100 at number 17 the week of 22 February 1997, selling 46,000 units in its first-week. The single ultimately peaked at number 8 the week of 1 March 1997, becoming the first top 10 to originate in a stage musical since 1985 and Webber's first top 10 single in the US. The track also ranked within the top 20 of Billboard's Adult Contemporary and Adult Top 40 charts while the "Miami Mix" reached the top of the Billboard Hot Dance Club Songs chart. It ranked at number 87 on the year end chart for 1997.

In Canada, the song debuted on the RPM Top Singles chart at number 34, the week of 10 March 1997. It ultimately reached a peak of number 11, the week of 7 April 1997. "Don't Cry for Me Argentina" reached number 1 on the European Hot 100 Singles, the week of 8 February 1997. In the United Kingdom, the song reached number 3 on the week of 28 December 1996, and was present on the top 100 for a total of 13 weeks. The song was certified gold by the British Phonographic Industry (BPI) on 19 November 2021 for sales and streams exceeding 400,000. In Italy, it reached the second position on the FIMI singles chart. In Australia, "Don't Cry for Me Argentina" peaked at number 9 on the ARIA Singles Chart, staying on this position for one week and a total of 13 weeks on the chart. On the year-end ARIA charts, the song ranked at number 56. In France, it topped the SNEP Singles Chart for one month. It was her first number one song in the country since La Isla Bonita reached the top position in 1987. In Ireland, the song peaked at number 8, the week of 19 December 1996. The single also proved to be a commercial success in other countries such as Belgium, Germany, Spain and the Netherlands, where it managed to have top 5 placement.

=== Promotion and live performances ===
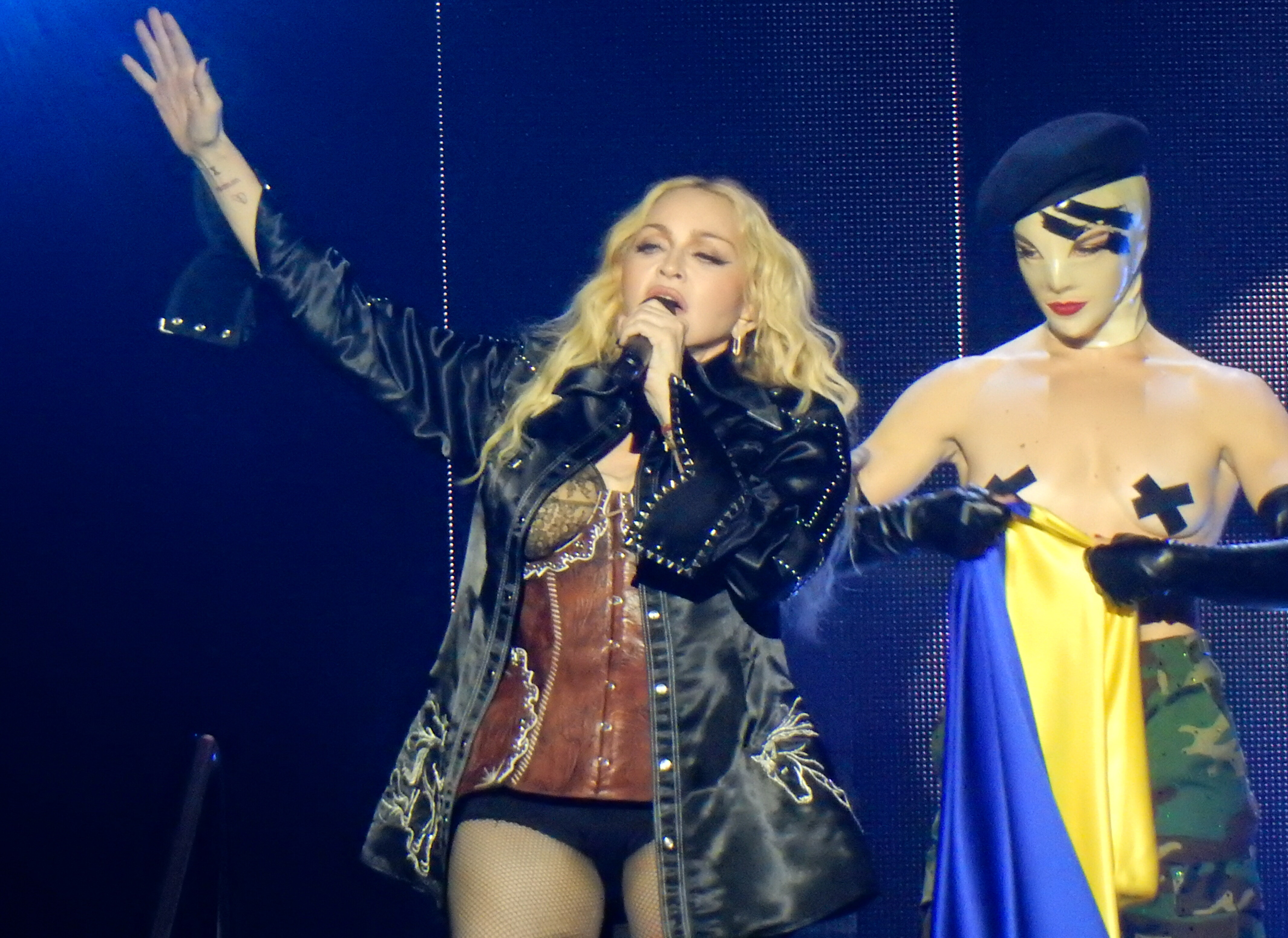
Madonna singing "Don't Cry for Me Argentina" on one of the London concerts of the Celebration Tour (2023–2024)

No official video was shot for the song. Instead, the scene from the movie, where Eva performs the song at the balcony of the Casa Rosada, was used. In 1993, two years before being cast in Evita, Madonna performed an impromptu version of the song during her first visit to Argentina with the Girlie Show. Eight years later, on 2001's Drowned World Tour, an instrumental version of the song was used as an interlude, featuring several dancers doing a Tango number. The performance on 26 August 2001, at The Palace of Auburn Hills, outside of Madonna's hometown of Detroit was recorded and released in the live video album, Drowned World Tour 2001. On the Buenos Aires stop of her Sticky & Sweet Tour in December 2008, after performing "You Must Love Me", Madonna also performed "Don't Cry for Me Argentina" as scenes from Evita played on the backdrop screens. The performances of both songs in the city were recorded in the live DVD titled, Sticky & Sweet Tour (2010).

The singer once again performed the song in Argentina during the MDNA Tour in December 2012. For the performance, she had the word "Eva" painted across her back. Madonna also did a "passionate rendition" of "Don't Cry for Me Argentina" during the Miami stop of her Rebel Heart Tour on 23 January 2016, accompanied by acoustic guitar. On 6 December, Madonna performed "Don't Cry for Me Argentina" during the Carpool Karaoke segment of The Late Late Show with James Corden. Seven years later, on the Celebration Tour, the song was mashed-up with "La Isla Bonita" (1987). The number ended with Madonna ―who donned a cowboy hat, leather jacket, and pride flag as cape― chanting the phrase "no fear!", while a picture of Irish singer Sinéad O'Connor was shown on the backdrop screens. From the Palm Springs Tribune, Marc Bearden felt the rendition was "beautifully done".

=== Track listings ===
- EU & UK CD single
1. "Don't Cry for Me Argentina" (performed by Madonna) – 5:31
2. "Santa Evita" (performed by Orchestra/John Mauceri) – 2:30
3. "Latin Chant" (performed by Orchestra/John Mauceri) – 2:11
- EU & UK "The Dance Mixes" CD single; Australian CD single; German 12-inch single
1. "Don't Cry for Me Argentina" (Miami Mix Edit) – 4:31
2. "Don't Cry for Me Argentina" (Miami Spanglish Mix Edit) – 4:29
3. "Don't Cry for Me Argentina" (Miami Mix) – 6:51
4. "Don't Cry for Me Argentina" (album version) – 5:31
- US 12-inch and CD Maxi-single (1997)
1. "Don't Cry for Me Argentina" (Miami Mix Alternative Ending) – 7:59
2. "Don't Cry for Me Argentina" (Miami Spanglish Mix) – 6:57
3. "Don't Cry for Me Argentina" (Miami Mix Edit) – 4:29
4. "Don't Cry for Me Argentina" (Miami Dub Mix) – 6:23
5. "Don't Cry for Me Argentina" (Miami Mix Instrumental Version) – 6:55
6. "Don't Cry for Me Argentina" (Miami Spanglish Mix Edit) – 4:28
- Digital single (2022)
1. "Don't Cry for Me Argentina" (Radio Edit) – 4:50
2. "Don't Cry for Me Argentina" (Miami Mix Edit) – 4:31
3. "Don't Cry for Me Argentina" (Miami Spanglish Mix Edit) – 4:30
4. "Don't Cry for Me Argentina" (Miami Mix) – 6:57
5. "Don't Cry for Me Argentina" (Miami Spanglish Mix) – 6:59
6. "Don't Cry for Me Argentina" (Miami Mix Alternative Ending) – 8:02
7. "Don't Cry for Me Argentina" (Miami Dub Mix) – 6:26
8. "Don't Cry for Me Argentina" (Miami Mix Instrumental Version) – 6:57
9. "Don't Cry for Me Argentina" (Album Version) – 5:36

=== Charts ===
==== Weekly charts ====
Weekly chart performance
Chart (1996–1997)	Peak position
Australia (ARIA)	9
Austria (Ö3 Austria Top 40)	3
Belgium (Ultratop 50 Flanders)	5
Belgium (Ultratop 50 Wallonia)	2
Canada (Nielsen SoundScan)	1
Canada Top Singles (RPM)	14
Canada Adult Contemporary (RPM)	3
Canada Contemporary Hit Radio (BDS)	3
Canada Dance/Urban (RPM) Remix	17
Czech Republic (IFPI)	1
Europe (European Hot 100 Singles)	1
Europe Airplay (European Radio Top 50)	2
Finland (Suomen virallinen lista)	8
France (SNEP)	1
Germany (GfK)	3
Hungary (Mahasz)	1
Hungary Airplay (Music & Media)	1
Iceland (Íslenski Listinn Topp 40)	2
Ireland (IRMA)	9
Israel (Israeli Singles Chart)	1
Italy (FIMI)	2
Italy Airplay (Music & Media)	3
Mexico (Notitas Musicales)	1
Netherlands (Dutch Top 40)	3
Netherlands (Single Top 100)	4
New Zealand (Recorded Music NZ)	6
Norway (VG-lista)	9
Scottish Singles Sales (Official Charts)	3
Spain (AFYVE)	1
Spain Airplay (Music & Media)	1
Sweden (Sverigetopplistan)	9
Switzerland (Schweizer Hitparade)	4
UK Singles (Official Charts)	3
US Billboard Hot 100	8
US Adult Contemporary (Billboard)	21
US Adult Pop Airplay (Billboard)	14
US Dance Club Songs (Billboard)	1
US Dance Singles Sales (Billboard)	1
US Pop Airplay (Billboard)	7
US Rhythmic Airplay (Billboard)	11

==== Year-end charts ====
Year-end chart performance
Chart (1997)	Position
Australia (ARIA)	56
Austria (Ö3 Austria Top 40)	19
Belgium (Ultratop 50 Flanders)	36
Belgium (Ultratop 50 Wallonia)	18
Brazil (Brazilian Radio Airplay)	81
Canada (SoundScan)	6
Canada Top Singles (RPM)	92
Canada Adult Contemporary (RPM)	34
Europe (Eurochart Hot 100)	8
France (SNEP)	14
Germany (Media Control)	22
Iceland (Íslenski Listinn Topp 40)	31
Netherlands (Dutch Top 40)	46
Netherlands (Single Top 100)	80
Romania (Romanian Top 100)	27
Spain (AFYVE)	4
Sweden (Topplistan)	54
Switzerland (Schweizer Hitparade)	22
UK Singles (OCC)	63
US Billboard Hot 100	87
US Maxi-Singles Sales (Billboard)	10
US Rhythmic Top 40 (Billboard)	67
US Top 40/Mainstream (Billboard)	53

=== Decade-end charts ===
Decade-end chart performance for "Don't Cry for Me Argentina"
Chart (1990–1999)	Position
Canada (Nielsen SoundScan)	28

=== Certifications and sales ===
Certifications and sales for "Don't Cry for Me Argentina"
Region	Certification	Certified units/sales
Australia (ARIA)	Gold	35,000^{^}
Belgium (BRMA)	Platinum	50,000^{*}
France (SNEP)	Gold	250,000^{*}
Germany (BVMI)	Gold	250,000^{^}
Switzerland (IFPI Switzerland)	Gold	25,000^{^}
United Kingdom (BPI)	Gold	400,000^{‡}
^{*} Sales figures based on certification alone.^{^} Shipments figures based on certification alone.^{‡} Sales+streaming figures based on certification alone.

== Other versions ==
"Don't Cry for Me Argentina" has been recorded by a number of actors portraying Eva Peron in subsequent productions of Evita including Elaine Paige (1978 Original London Cast Recording), Patti LuPone (1979 Original Broadway Cast Recording), Elena Roger (2006 London Cast and 2014 Broadway Cast Recordings) and Rachel Zegler (2025 London Cast). Marti Webb, who succeeded Elaine Paige in the original London production of Evita, covered the song on her album Won't Change Places, produced by Andrew Lloyd Webber in 1981, and also included it in 1995 on the album, Music and Songs from Evita. AllMusic's Joe Francis complimented the recording.

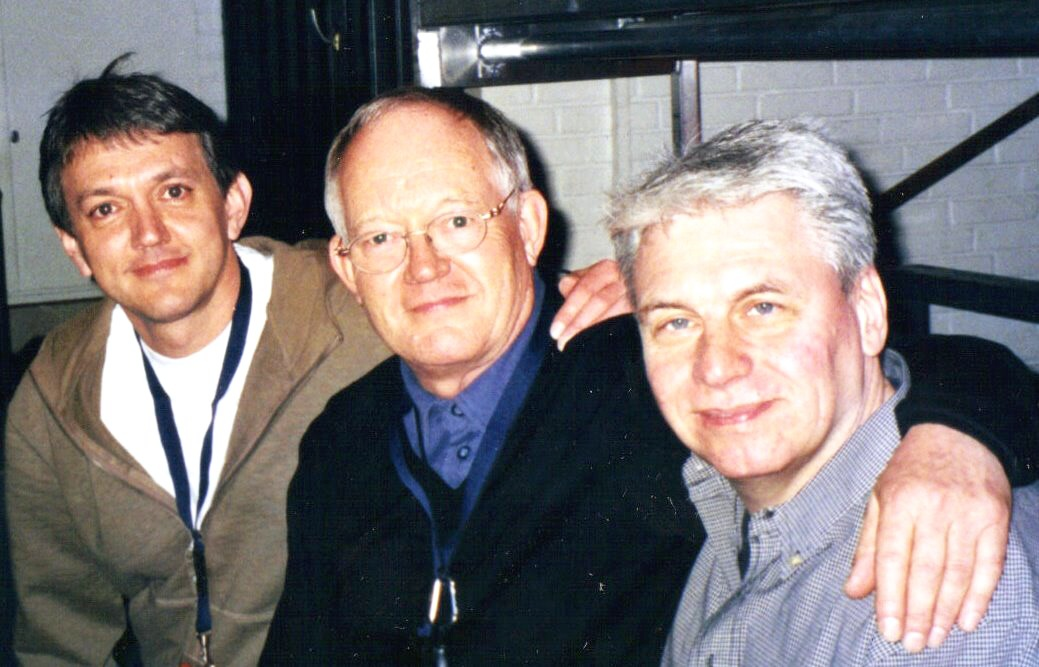
The Shadows' 1978 version of "Don't Cry for Me Argentina" was a top-five hit in the United Kingdom.

The Carpenters recorded the song for their 1977 album, Passage, coupled with "On the Balcony of the Casa Rosada" which precedes it in the musical's score. The same year, Olivia Newton-John released the song as a single from her tenth studio album, Making a Good Thing Better. In 1978, the Shadows recorded an instrumental version that reached number five on the UK Singles Chart. Also in 1978 Shirley Bassey recorded the song for her album, The Magic Is You. Simon Gage from the Daily Express praised the rendition, saying that Bassey "more than covers the ground" with it. She recorded it again in 1993 for her album Sings the Songs of Andrew Lloyd Webber.

Singer Tom Jones' interpretation of the song on his 1979 album, Rescue Me, received negative reviews, with biographer Lucy Ellis describing it as "the most ludicrous massacre on the LP". American disco group Festival (produced by Boris Midney) released a version in 1979, the single from an entire LP of disco covers of songs from Evita; it reached 72 on the Billboard Hot 100. Paloma San Basilio performed the song when she played the title role on the Spanish adaptation of the musical in 1980. Nacha Guevara, who also starred in the musical in 1986, has performed the song live several times.

Singer Sinéad O'Connor recorded "Don't Cry for Me Argentina" on her album Am I Not Your Girl? (1992). Her version received a mixed response, with Joy Press from Spin who described the rendition as "a melodramatic, sweeping 'Je ne regrette rien'—style apologia. O'Connor had a calling. Obsessed with purity and truth, she pitched herself somewhere between Christ and the Virgin Mary, as an asexual visionary whose suffering was Inextricably Intertwined with the pain of Ireland and of the world." Released as a CD maxi single, the song reached number 31 in Belgium Flanders and number 44 in Netherlands. An easy listening cover version of the song by The Mike Flowers Pops reached number 30 in the UK singles charts in 1996. A punk rock version was recorded by alternative band Me First and the Gimme Gimmes in 1999 for their second studio album, Are a Drag. Angus Cargill, author of Hang the DJ: An alternative book of music lists was shocked by the complete revamp of the song as punk rock, saying that "there's a dark appeal in here, like the thought of taking a cattle prod to your grandma's". An unidentified piano rendition was also used as an identifier for V19, a numbers station of unknown origin; an audio recording from the station, titled "Whiskey Tango Viente Y Uno" after its callsign, is included on The Conet Project.

It is covered by Lloyd Webber's younger brother and cellist Julian on the 2001 album, Lloyd Webber Plays Lloyd Webber. Another version was recorded in 2010 by TV series Glee's actors Lea Michele and Chris Colfer, as the characters Rachel Berry and Kurt Hummel respectively. It was sung as a duet with each singer taking a different stanza and performing before a different audience in a split-scene. Their solo versions were also in Glee: The Music, The Complete Season Two and reached number 67 in the United Kingdom and number 97 in the US. Multinational quartet Il Divo recorded it on their 2011 album, Wicked Game, and performed it live on tours. The group's voice was considered suitable for musical numbers like "Don't Cry for Me Argentina", by Ben Walsh from The Independent. Nicole Scherzinger performed the song live at the Andrew Lloyd Webber: 40 Musical Years tribute show. Louis Virtel from The Backlot complimented her vocals, saying that the performance "has to be seen to be believed, as Scherzinger's crystal-clear vocal soars like a glittery javelin".

== See also ==
Julie Covington version

- List of Top 25 singles for 1977 in Australia
- List of Dutch Top 40 number-one singles of 1977
- List of number-one singles of 1977 (Ireland)
- List of number-one singles in 1977 (New Zealand)
- List of UK Singles Chart number ones of the 1970s

Madonna version

- List of Top 25 singles for 1997 in Australia
- List of European number-one hits of 1997
- List of number-one singles of 1997 (France)
- List of number-one singles of 1997 (Spain)
- List of number-one dance singles of 1997 (U.S.)

== Bibliography ==
- Boyce, D. George (2005). The Falklands War. Palgrave Macmillan. ISBN 978-0-230-80198-1.
- Cargill, Angus (2014). Hang the DJ: An Alternative Book of Music Lists. Faber & Faber. ISBN 978-0-571-30717-3.
- Clark, Mark Ross (2015). The Broadway Song: A Singer's Guide. Oxford University Press. ISBN 978-0-19-935167-1.
- Clarke, Donald (1998). The Penguin Encyclopedia of Popular Music. Penguin Books. ISBN 978-0-14-051370-7.
- The Million Sellers. Omnibus Press. 2012. ISBN 978-0-85712-882-9.
- Ellis, Lucy (2009). Tom Jones Close Up. Omnibus Press. ISBN 978-0-85712-107-3.
- Humphries, Patrick; Bracknell, Steve (2013). Top of the Pops 50th Anniversary. McNidder and Grace Limited. ISBN 978-0-85716-063-8.
- Knapp, Raymond (2010). The American Musical and the Performance of Personal Identity. Princeton University Press. ISBN 978-1-4008-3268-2.
- Kent, David (1993). Australian Chart Book 1970–1992. Australian Chart Book. ISBN 978-0-646-11917-5.
- Michael, Mick St. (2004). Madonna 'Talking': Madonna in Her Own Words. Omnibus Press. ISBN 1-84449-418-7.
- Morton, Andrew (2002). Madonna. Macmillan Publishers. ISBN 0-312-98310-7.
- O'Brien, Lucy (2008). Madonna: Like an Icon. Bantam Press. ISBN 978-0-552-15361-4.
- Rice, Tim (2012). Oh, What a Circus. Hachette UK. ISBN 978-1-4447-6217-4.
- Rooksby, Rikky (2004). The Complete Guide to the Music of Madonna. Omnibus Press. ISBN 0-7119-9883-3.
- Salaverri, Fernando (2005). Sólo éxitos: año a año, 1959–2002. Fundación Autor-SGAE. ISBN 84-8048-639-2.
- Scaping, Peter; Hunter, Nigel (1978). BPI Year Book 1978. British Phonographic Industry. ISBN 0-906154-01-4.
- Taraborrelli, Randy J. (2008). Madonna: An Intimate Biography. Simon & Schuster. ISBN 978-0-330-45446-9.
