= List of European number-one hits of 1997 =

This is a list of the European Music & Media magazine's European Hot 100 Singles and European Top 100 Albums number-ones of 1997.

Issue date	Song	Artist	Album	Artist
4 January	"One & One"	Robert Miles featuring Maria Nayler	Spice	Spice Girls
11 January	"One & One"	Robert Miles featuring Maria Nayler	Spice	Spice Girls
18 January	"One & One"	Robert Miles featuring Maria Nayler	Spice	Spice Girls
25 January	"Un-Break My Heart"	Toni Braxton	Spice	Spice Girls
1 February	"Un-Break My Heart"	Toni Braxton	Spice	Spice Girls
8 February	"Don't Cry For Me Argentina"	Madonna	Spice	Spice Girls
15 February	"Don't Cry For Me Argentina"	Madonna	Evita	Madonna
22 February	"Don't Speak"	No Doubt	Evita	Madonna
1 March	"Don't Speak"	No Doubt	Evita	Madonna
8 March	"Don't Speak"	No Doubt	Spice	Spice Girls
15 March	"Don't Speak"	No Doubt	Spice	Spice Girls
22 March	"Don't Speak"	No Doubt	Pop	U2
29 March	"Don't Speak"	No Doubt	Pop	U2
5 April	"Don't Speak"	No Doubt	Pop	U2
12 April	"Don't Speak"	No Doubt	Pop	U2
19 April	"Don't Speak"	No Doubt	Spice	Spice Girls
26 April	"I Believe I Can Fly"	R. Kelly	Spice	Spice Girls
3 May	"I Believe I Can Fly"	R. Kelly	Ultra	Depeche Mode
10 May	"I Believe I Can Fly"	R. Kelly	Ultra	Depeche Mode
17 May	"I Believe I Can Fly"	R. Kelly	Ultra	Depeche Mode
24 May	"I Believe I Can Fly"	R. Kelly	Spice	Spice Girls
31 May	"I Believe I Can Fly"	R. Kelly	Spice	Spice Girls
7 June	"Time to Say Goodbye"	Sarah Brightman & Andrea Bocelli	Blood on the Dance Floor: HIStory in the Mix	Michael Jackson
14 June	"MMMBop"	Hanson	Blood on the Dance Floor: HIStory in the Mix	Michael Jackson
21 June	"MMMBop"	Hanson	Blood on the Dance Floor: HIStory in the Mix	Michael Jackson
28 June	"MMMBop"	Hanson	Romanza	Andrea Bocelli
5 July	"MMMBop"	Hanson	Destination Anywhere	Jon Bon Jovi
12 July	"MMMBop"	Hanson	Destination Anywhere	Jon Bon Jovi
19 July	"I'll Be Missing You"	Puff Daddy & Faith Evans featuring 112	The Fat of the Land	The Prodigy
26 July	"I'll Be Missing You"	Puff Daddy & Faith Evans featuring 112	The Fat of the Land	The Prodigy
2 August	"I'll Be Missing You"	Puff Daddy & Faith Evans featuring 112	The Fat of the Land	The Prodigy
9 August	"I'll Be Missing You"	Puff Daddy & Faith Evans featuring 112	The Fat of the Land	The Prodigy
16 August	"I'll Be Missing You"	Puff Daddy & Faith Evans featuring 112	The Fat of the Land	The Prodigy
23 August	"I'll Be Missing You"	Puff Daddy & Faith Evans featuring 112	The Fat of the Land	The Prodigy
30 August	"I'll Be Missing You"	Puff Daddy & Faith Evans featuring 112	The Fat of the Land	The Prodigy
6 September	"I'll Be Missing You"	Puff Daddy & Faith Evans featuring 112	Backstreet's Back	Backstreet Boys
13 September	"I'll Be Missing You"	Puff Daddy & Faith Evans featuring 112	Be Here Now	Oasis
20 September	"Men in Black"	Will Smith	Be Here Now	Oasis
27 September	"I'll Be Missing You"	Puff Daddy & Faith Evans featuring 112	Be Here Now	Oasis
4 October	"Something About the Way You Look Tonight"/"Candle in the Wind 1997"	Elton John	Be Here Now	Oasis
11 October	"Something About the Way You Look Tonight"/"Candle in the Wind 1997"	Elton John	The Big Picture	Elton John
18 October	"Something About the Way You Look Tonight"/"Candle in the Wind 1997"	Elton John	Bridges to Babylon	Rolling Stones
25 October	"Something About the Way You Look Tonight"/"Candle in the Wind 1997"	Elton John	Bridges to Babylon	Rolling Stones
1 November	"Something About the Way You Look Tonight"/"Candle in the Wind 1997"	Elton John	Bridges to Babylon	Rolling Stones
8 November	"Something About the Way You Look Tonight"/"Candle in the Wind 1997"	Elton John	Urban Hymns	The Verve
15 November	"Barbie Girl"	Aqua	Eros	Eros Ramazzotti
22 November	"Barbie Girl"	Aqua	Spiceworld	Spice Girls
29 November	"Barbie Girl"	Aqua	Spiceworld	Spice Girls
6 December	"Barbie Girl"	Aqua	Let's Talk About Love	Celine Dion
13 December	"Barbie Girl"	Aqua	Let's Talk About Love	Celine Dion
20 December	"Barbie Girl"	Aqua	Let's Talk About Love	Celine Dion
27 December	"Barbie Girl"	Aqua	Let's Talk About Love	Celine Dion
