= Another Suitcase in Another Hall =

1977 single by Barbara Dickson

Single by Barbara Dickson

from the album Evita
- B-side: "Requiem for Evita"
- Released: 7 February 1977
- Recorded: 1976
- Genre: Pop
- Length: 2:45
- Label: MCA
- Composer: Andrew Lloyd Webber
- Lyricist: Tim Rice
- Producer: Andrew Lloyd Webber

Barbara Dickson singles chronology
"Out of Love with Love" (1976)	"Another Suitcase in Another Hall" (1977)	"Lover's Serenade" (1977)

"Another Suitcase in Another Hall" is a song recorded by Scottish singer Barbara Dickson, for the 1976 concept album Evita, the basis of the musical of the same name. The musical was based on the life of Argentinian leader Eva Perón. Written by Tim Rice and Andrew Lloyd Webber, the song is presented during a sequence where Eva throws her husband's mistress out on the streets. The latter sings the track, wondering about her future and concluding that she would be fine. The songwriters enlisted Dickson to record the track after hearing her previous work.

Rice and Webber asked her to record the song using a higher than usual pitch, so that she sounded younger like her character. Featuring instrumentation of guitar, marimba, harp and keyboard, "Another Suitcase in Another Hall" finds Dickson singing in a soprano voice. Critically appreciated, the song was released as a single on 7 February 1977, and reached number 18 on the UK Singles Chart. Dickson did not like her recorded version of the track and employed a different arrangement during her future live renditions.

The song has been covered and performed many times by other artists, namely Elaine Paige, Marti Webb, Kimberley Walsh from British girl group Girls Aloud, and actress Samantha Barks. Another notable version was recorded by American singer Madonna, who played the part of Eva for the 1996 film adaptation of the musical. It was released on 3 March 1997, by Warner Bros. as the third and final single from the film's soundtrack. Unlike the musical, in the film the track was sung by Madonna's character instead of the mistress. Upon its release, the song garnered positive response from music critics and reached the top ten of the charts in Italy and the United Kingdom.

== Background and recording ==
"Another Suitcase in Another Hall" was written by Andrew Lloyd Webber and Tim Rice while they were developing the Evita concept album in 1976. Both were extremely intrigued by the stories surrounding the life of Eva Perón while researching her during the mid-1970s. They learned of her husband Juan Perón, and his affinity for young women, and Rice and Webber decided to use it as one of the backstories behind Eva and Juan's rise to power. The song is performed by the character of Juan's teenage mistress after she is "kicked out" by his future wife, Eva. According to director Michael Grandage, the story took the "edge off" a supposed fairy-tale-like interpretation of Eva and Juan, unveiling their ambitions and cutthroat personalities. From a production point of view, it also allowed Grandage to show ruthlessness of Eva, when Juan allows her to throw his "mistress" away. The girl is ultimately left on the streets with nowhere to go, and there she sings the song.

It is a particularly poignant melody that should play with an audience's emotions. The mistress clearly knew what she was doing sleeping with an older man, and yet there is something expletive about it as well. Eva's bitchiness should be enjoyed by an audience, but they should also be investing in the plight of a young girl's eviction. The narrative of this section is so well structured that it is obvious the journey of the mistress is complete by her exit. This allows the audience to invest in a single moment while also learning more about Eva and Perón's character as they move forward in the story.

The song was first recorded by singer Barbara Dickson in 1976 for the Evita concept album that eventually became the stage musical. Rice and Webber had already enlisted actress Julie Covington to sing the part of Eva, hence they were on the lookout for other supporting vocal personnel. They found out about Dickson, who had recently starred in the Willy Russell musical John, Paul, George, Ringo ... and Bert, and had charted on the UK Singles Chart with her cover version of the David Whitfield and Frankie Laine song "Answer Me" (1976). Dickson and her manager, Bernard Theobald, had a discussion with Rice and Webber about starring in the musical, but her voice was declared "too delicate" for singing the numbers on Evita. So they offered her one song which was not sung by Eva's character, and that was "Another Suitcase in Another Hall".

== Music composition ==
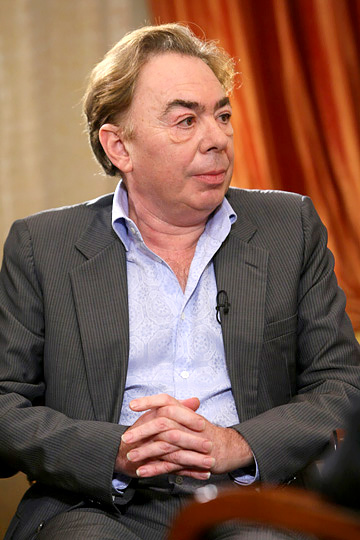
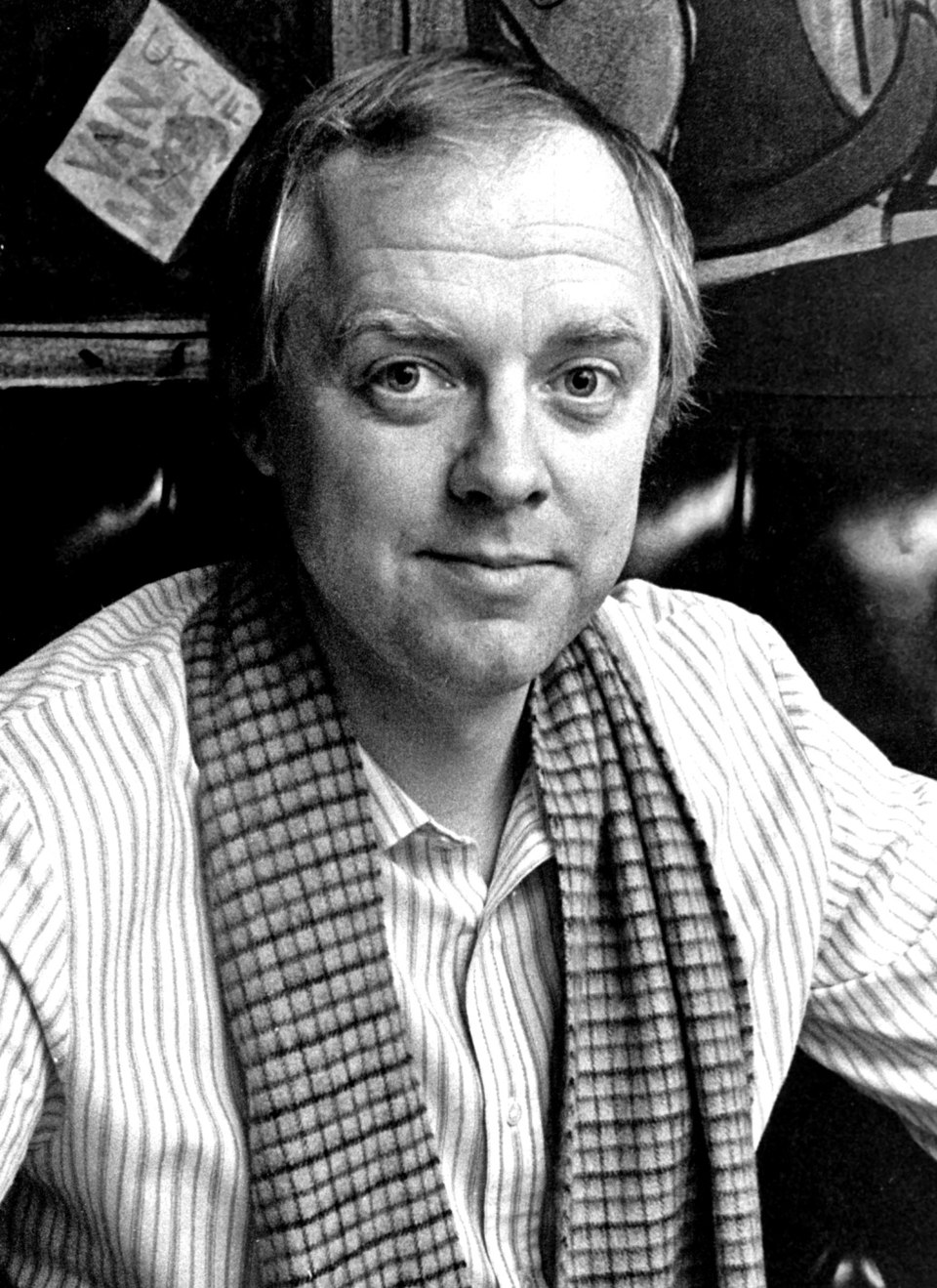
Co-writers of "Another Suitcase in Another Hall", Andrew Lloyd Webber and Tim Rice.

Dickson recalled that during the recording sessions, Webber asked her to sing in a higher range than her usual, since the "mistress" character was a teenager, and should have sounded younger. Before the sequence of the eviction of the mistress occurs in Act I of the musical, Eva's character sings the song "Hello and goodbye" and then "Another Suitcase in Another Hall" begins. A soft strummed guitar in broken chord patterns heralds the introductory music. Dickson sings the opening verse, and the chorus which is repeated twice as she asks, "So, what happens now?" and wonders about her immediate future, ultimately concluding that she would survive. For the second verse, the lyrics reflect on this recurring pattern of being evicted out of men's lives, and the final verses have a more positive outlook toward's the subject's life. The song finishes with the mistress asking the question, "Where am I going to?" as a male voice pacifies by saying, "Don't ask, anymore". In 2004, author Rikky Rooksby released the book The Complete Guide to the Music of Madonna, where he wrote his thoughts about the popularity of the song:

Eva is the center of attention [in the song] but the lyric does not allow a transfer of meaning outside of the context of her story. Part of the song's popularity lies in the way it finds an image—the suitcase in the hall—to express the nomadic nature of modern civilization, the feeling of urban rootlessness that many people experience. The theme of constant moving strikes a resonant note.

"Another Suitcase in Another Hall" features instrumentation of guitar, marimba, harp and keyboard, with Dickson singing in a soprano voice. Author Mark Ross Clark noted in his book The Broadway Song: A Singer's Guide that her vocals portrayed different emotions. Her vocals contrast the lyrics with an "underlying coolness".

== Release and reception ==
After the first single from the Evita album, "Don't Cry for Me Argentina", achieved commercial success, "Another Suitcase in Another Hall" was released as the second single on 7 February 1977. A reviewer from Melody Maker complimented the song, saying that without the context of Evita, the song was more acceptable and was "poignant and lovely. How lucky Lloyd Webber and Rice are to have Julie Covington and now Dickson, to add the flesh and bones to songs which might otherwise be wrecks of soppy melodrama. A smash hit." It was Dickson's second single to chart on the UK Singles Chart, following "Answer Me" in 1976, and entered the chart at number 44 in its first week and peaked at number 18 in its fifth week. It was present for a total of seven weeks on the chart.

Due to the high pitch employed in the recording, Dickson reflected in later years that she "never liked the original [track] for that reason. The song has seasoned over the years with my singing of it." Dickson believed that she did not sound like herself on the song. While performing it later in her concerts, Dickson sang it in her actual tone, saying that although the track "might have been written for a teenage girl, but the experience of being abandoned by a man is one, women of all ages can relate to. I think you have to be honest with songs and with yourself." The singer's music director Ian Lynn arranged the track differently, which she performs currently.

== Track listing ==
- 7" Single, Company Sleeve
1. "Another Suitcase in Another Hall" (Album version) – 3:00
2. "Requiem For Evita" (Choir and London Philharmonic Orchestra) – 3:05

== Personnel ==
- Barbara Dickson – vocals
- Tim Rice – writer
- Andrew Lloyd Webber – writer, producer, orchestra
- Nigel Wright – producer, mixing
- Denis Blackham – mixing, mastering at Master Room Studios

Credits adapted from the single's liner notes.

== Charts ==
Chart (1977)	Peak position
UK Singles (OCC)	18

== Madonna version ==
"Another Suitcase in Another Hall"

Single by Madonna

from the album Evita
- B-side: "Don't Cry for Me Argentina"
- Released: 18 March 1997
- Recorded: 1995
- Genre: Pop
- Length: 3:32
- Label: Warner Bros.
- Songwriters: Tim Rice; Andrew Lloyd Webber
- Producers: Nigel Wright; Alan Parker; Andrew Lloyd Webber

Madonna singles chronology
"Don't Cry for Me Argentina" (1996)	"Another Suitcase in Another Hall" (1997)	"Frozen" (1998)

Licensed audio
- "Another Suitcase in Another Hall" on YouTube

=== Background and development ===
In 1996, Madonna starred in the film adaptation of the musical, titled Evita, playing the role of Eva; she had desired to play the part for a long time and even wrote to director Alan Parker, explaining how she would be perfect for the part. After securing the role, she underwent vocal training with coach Joan Lader since Evita required the actors to sing their own parts. Lader noted that the singer "had to use her voice in a way she's never used it before. Evita is real musical theater — its operatic, in a sense. Madonna developed an upper register that she didn't know she had." Unlike the musical, in the film the song is performed by Eva after ending her relationship with Agustín Magaldi, deciding she wants to improve her life. The song was not promoted and only a video was created using footage and scenes from the film.

=== Recording and composition ===
'Another Suitcase in Another Hall'
A 22 second clip of "Another Suitcase in Another Hall" where Madonna sings the verses using breathy vocals and a key sequence of C♭ to F♭

Recording sessions for the film's songs and soundtrack began in September 1995, and took place at the CTS Studios in London with Madonna accompanied by co-actors Antonio Banderas and Jonathan Pryce. However, trouble arose as Madonna was not comfortable with laying down a "guide vocal" simultaneously with an 84 piece orchestra inside the studio. She was used to singing over a pre-recorded track and not having musicians listen to her. Also, unlike her previous soundtrack releases, she had little to no control over the project. An emergency meeting was held between Parker, Webber and Madonna where it was decided that the singer would record her part in a more contemporary studio while the orchestration would take place somewhere else. She also had alternate days off from the recording.

Madonna's version of the song begins with the same softly strummed guitar in broken chords. Madonna sings in a breathy voice, giving her character more vulnerability. The first vocal entrance leads into an engaging melody with the opening phrase, "so what happens now?", repeated twice. According to the sheet music published by Musicnotes.com, the song is set in common time, with a slow tempo of 50 beats per minute. It is composed in the key of C♭ major, with Madonna's vocals spanning from A_{3} to E♭_{5}. The song has a sequence of C♭–F♭ when Madonna sings the opening verse "I don't expect my love affairs to last for long".

=== Release and reception ===
The song was officially released as the soundtrack's third single on 18 March 1997 in Europe. Originally, there were talks about releasing an Evita EP, containing remixed versions of "Buenos Aires", "Don't Cry for Me Argentina" and "Another Suitcase in Another Hall", but it did not materialize. In the United Kingdom, the song peaked at number 7 on the UK Singles Chart, the week of 29 March 1997, and was present on the top 100 for a total of 8 weeks. According to the Official Charts Company, the single had sold 75,233 copies in the United Kingdom as of August 2008. The song also reached a peak of number 23 on the Irish Singles Chart, where it remained for 3 weeks. Elsewhere, it had a relatively poor chart performance; in Sweden it peaked at number 60, while in the Netherlands it peaked at number 91. "Another Suitcase in Another Hall" was Madonna's first single released in Australia to miss the ARIA top 100. The song was initially scheduled to impact contemporary hit radio in the United States on April 15, 1997, but its release to the format was ultimately canceled.

AllMusic's Jose F. Promis, wrote that "the song finds Madonna giving an understated and inspired performance [...] One hopes that this overlooked gem might find its way onto future [Madonna] hits collections, because it is truly a wonderful song". Author Thomas S. Hischak called it "plaintive". Billboard's Geoff Burpee called it "A sterling, intimate moment from the Evita soundtrack. Yes kids, she can sing". Writing for the Los Angeles Times, David Gritten opined Madonna's voice sounded "pitch-perfect and clear as a bell". Greg Morago, from the Hartford Courant, felt that "By giving her 'Another Suitcase' with its heartbreaking 'Where am I going to?' refrain, Madonna adds a necessary, fragile vulnerability to her ambitious, rags-to-riches Eva Perón". Neil Strauss from The Herald Journal, said that "Madonna radiates on 'Another Suitcase in Another Hall'".

Peter Keough, from the Boston Phoenix, described the track as "a poignant, winsome exploration of pathos, defilement, and resolution sung by a young, struggling Eva forced into prostitution with a series of drab johns". The Guardian's Jude Rogers wrote that "Madonna's wavering vocal goes full collywobbles", placing the track at number 69 on her ranking of the singer's singles, in honor of her 60th birthday. Finally, Billboard picked it as the singer's 98th greatest song; "the delicate composition and high-register vocal make this exquisite breakup ballad a rare moment of true fragility in Madonna's catalog". Slant Magazine's Paul Schrodt placed it at number 77 in his ranking of the singer's singles, calling it "a sleepy travelogue set to schmaltzy acoustic guitar and saxophone and a male chorus echoing Eva Perón's —and by extension Madonna's— self-pitying complaints about moving from one place to another. Political and psychological nuance, meanwhile, are nowhere in sight".

=== Track listing and formats ===
- EU & UK CD single
1. "Another Suitcase in Another Hall" (Album version) – 3:32
2. "Don't Cry for Me Argentina" (Miami Mix Edit) – 4:28
3. "You Must Love Me" (Album version) – 2:50
4. "Hello and Goodbye" (Album version) – 1:47
- UK Limited Edition Jewel Case
1. "Another Suitcase in Another Hall" (Album version) – 3:32
2. "You Must Love Me" (Album version) – 2:50
3. "Hello and Goodbye" – 1:47
4. "Waltz for Eva and Ché" – 4:11
- UK Cassette single
1. "Another Suitcase in Another Hall" (Album version) – 3:32
2. "Don't Cry for Me Argentina" (Miami Mix Edit) – 4:31

=== Charts ===
Chart (1997)	Peak position
Australia (ARIA)	118
Belgium (Ultratip Bubbling Under Wallonia)	6
Europe (European Hot 100 Singles)	61
Italy (FIMI)	4
Ireland (IRMA)	23
Netherlands (Single Top 100)	91
Scotland Singles (OCC)	8
Sweden (Sverigetopplistan)	60
UK Singles (OCC)	7

== Other versions ==
English singer Elaine Paige recorded the song for her 1983 album Stages. Sarah Brightman, who was married to Webber from 1984 to 1990, included the song on her album The Andrew Lloyd Webber Collection. Marti Webb's version of the song was included in the 1995 album Music & Songs From Evita. English musician Hank Marvin included an instrumental version of the song on his 1997 tribute album Hank Marvin and the Shadows Play the Music of Andrew Lloyd Webber and Tim Rice. Kimberley Walsh, from British girl group Girls Aloud, covered the song for her debut studio album Centre Stage (2013). Singer Hayley Westenra included the song on her 2000 album Walking in the Air. On the tribute show Andrew Lloyd Webber: 40 Musical Years, the song was performed by actress Samantha Barks. British singer Sophie Ellis-Bextor performed the track along the BBC Concert Orchestra on Rice's homage Tim Rice: An Evening In Song on 8 July 2014.
