= Evita (album) =

Cast recording by Various artists
- Released: 19 November 1976
- Recorded: April–September 1976; Olympic Studios, London
- Length: 102:41
- Label: MCA
- Producers: Tim Rice; Andrew Lloyd Webber

Andrew Lloyd Webber and Tim Rice chronology
Jesus Christ Superstar (1970)	Evita (1976)	Cricket (1986)

Singles from Evita
- 1. "Don't Cry for Me Argentina" Released: 12 November 1976; 2. "Another Suitcase in Another Hall" Released: 7 February 1977; 3. "Oh What a Circus" Released: 19 August 1978

Evita is a concept album released in 1976 and produced by Andrew Lloyd Webber and Tim Rice about the life of Eva Perón. Having successfully launched their previous show, Jesus Christ Superstar, on record in 1970, Lloyd Webber and Rice returned to the format for Evita. It was released in the United Kingdom on 19 November 1976.

== Background ==
Elements of the original plotline on this album were removed before the show was staged in London in 1978. "Che" here was much more explicitly based on Che Guevara, including a subplot about Guevara's failed efforts to market the insecticide Vendaval, most significantly highlighted in the song "The Lady's Got Potential". The track was cut from the score and a new song written to include the key plotline of Juan Perón's rise to power: "The Art of the Possible".

The libretto and synopsis record "Part One" ending after the balcony scene following "Don't Cry for Me, Argentina" and "Part Two" beginning with "High Flying, Adored". On both the original LP and subsequent compact disc releases, though, the recording is split such that the balcony scene begins the second half. This split point was retained for the London stage production.

As well as producing the album, Lloyd Webber and Rice also performed on the recording. Rice's principal role was as one of the army officers on the track "Rainbow Tour" and Lloyd Webber played keyboards. In his autobiography, Rice quotes the production cost of the album at £74,827.83; around five times that of the Superstar concept album.

== Production ==
The album was principally recorded and mixed at Olympic Studios in London from April to September 1976, except for the track "Waltz for Eva and Che" which was recorded at Henry Wood Hall as Lloyd Webber preferred its live acoustic for that piece.

The album was first played, on tape, to an invited audience after which it was remixed and had 15 minutes of material cut or rewritten. The master discs were re-cut five times, with side four being re-cut nine times.

== Packaging ==
The gatefold album was released with a monochromatic sleeve, simply black text and photographs on a white background. The cover had the name "Evita" written in a cursive font across a line drawn heart and the subtitle "An opera based on the life story of Eva Peron 1919-1952" below. A glossy brochure was included that contained the credits, libretto and a synopsis, with photographs of the cast and producers by Lord Snowdon and others, collected by the film director Carlos Pasini, of Eva Perón.

The album was relaunched on compact disc in 1996 as the "20th Anniversary Edition" with the cover printed on a silver, blue metalised paper rather than the original white.

== Song list ==
Side breaks are from the original LP. The CD edition combines sides 1 and 2 on its first disc, and 3 and 4 on its second.

Side one

1. "A Cinema in Buenos Aires, 1952"
2. "Requiem for Evita" / "Oh What a Circus"
3. "On This Night of a Thousand Stars" / "Eva and Magaldi" / "Eva, Beware of the City"
4. "Buenos Aires"
5. "Goodnight and Thank You"

Side two

1. "The Lady's Got Potential"
2. "Charity Concert" / "I'd Be Surprisingly Good for You"
3. "Another Suitcase in Another Hall"
4. "Dangerous Jade"
5. "A New Argentina"

Side three

1. "On the Balcony of the Casa Rosada" / "Don't Cry for Me Argentina"
2. "High Flying, Adored"
3. "Rainbow High"
4. "Rainbow Tour"
5. "The Actress Hasn't Learned the Lines (You'd Like to Hear)"
6. "And the Money Kept Rolling In (And Out)"

Side four

1. "Santa Evita"
2. "Waltz for Eva and Che"
3. "She is a Diamond"
4. "Dice Are Rolling" / "Eva's Sonnet"
5. "Eva's Final Broadcast"
6. "Montage"
7. "Lament"

== Cast ==
- Julie Covington - Eva Perón
- Paul Jones - Juan Perón
- C.T. Wilkinson (Colm Wilkinson) - Che (Che Guevara in the later stage productions but not credited as such on this recording)
- Tony Christie - Agustín Magaldi
- Barbara Dickson - Mistress
- Mike Smith - Dolan Getta (a trade union leader)
- Mike d'Abo - Getta's sidekick
- Christopher Neil - Eva Perón Fund Manager (and backing vocals on "Another Suitcase in Another Hall")

== Musicians ==
- Peter van Hooke - drums, percussion
- Neil Hubbard - guitar
- Andrew Lloyd Webber - keyboards
- Hank B. Marvin - guitar
- Henry McCullough - guitar
- Chris Mercer - saxophone
- Mike Moran - keyboards
- Joe Moretti - guitar
- Barry Morgan - drums, percussion
- Anne Odell - keyboards
- Brian Odgers - bass guitar
- Simon Phillips - drums, percussion
- Ray Russell - guitar
- David Snell - harp
- Richard Windmann - bass guitar

The recording also featured The London Philharmonic Orchestra, conducted by Anthony Bowles.

== Charts ==
=== Weekly charts ===
Chart (1977)	Peak position
Australian Albums (Kent Music Report)	6
Dutch Albums (Album Top 100)	1
German Albums (Offizielle Top 100)	6
New Zealand Albums (RMNZ)	6
Spanish Albums (AFE)	4
Swedish Albums (Sverigetopplistan)	6
UK Albums (Official Charts)	4
Chart (2016)	Peak position
New Zealand Albums (RMNZ)	32

=== Year-end charts ===
Chart (1977)	Position
Australian Albums (Kent Music Report)	20
Dutch Albums (Album Top 100)	14
German Albums (Offizielle Top 100)	35
UK Albums (OCC)	30

== Certification ==
Region	Certification	Certified units/sales
Australia (ARIA)	Gold	20,000^{^}
Netherlands (NVPI)	Gold	75,000
United Kingdom (BPI)	Platinum	300,000^{^}
Summaries
Worldwide	—	700,000
^{^} Shipments figures based on certification alone.

== Production credits ==
- Producers - Andrew Lloyd Webber and Tim Rice
- Engineer - David Hamilton Smith
- Assistant engineers - Jeremy Gee and Anton Matthews
- Executive producer - David Land
- Orchestrations - Andrew Lloyd Webber
- Musical co-ordinator - Alan Doggett
- Mastering Engineer - Denis Blackham

Credits per AllMusic.

== See also ==
- Evita (musical)
- Evita (film)
