= Voices in the Sky: The Best of The Moody Blues =

- UK cover

Compilation album by the Moody Blues
- Released: 21 November 1984 (UK); 21 June 1985 (US)
- Recorded: October 1967 – December 1982
- Genres: Rock, progressive rock, pop rock
- Length: 53:44 (UK version); 46:05 (US version)
- Labels: Threshold (US), Decca (UK)
- Producers: Tony Clarke, Pip Williams

The Moody Blues chronology
The Present (1983)	Voices in the Sky: The Best of The Moody Blues (1984)	The Other Side of Life (1986)

Alternative cover
- US cover

Voices in the Sky: The Best of The Moody Blues is a greatest hits compilation for the Moody Blues, released in 1984.

At least 3 different versions of the album were released in various countries. The United Kingdom edition had 12 songs, while the United States release had only 10 in a different order. The editions released in the United States and Canada also had a different cover than the UK and European versions.

This compilation was the final release by the Moody Blues' custom label, Threshold Records.

== Critical reception ==
Professional ratings
Review scores
Source	Rating
AllMusic	3/5 stars

Reviewing the US version, Dave Connolly of AllMusic described the album as containing songs that "[i]ndividually ... are as impressive as you remember." However, he felt that the band essentially "had two careers ... the '60s and the '80s," and that this album "alternat[es] back and forth between the two without the proper context [which] is likely to confuse new listeners."

== Track listing ==
=== British edition ===
Side one

1. "Ride My See-Saw" (John Lodge) – 3:46
2. "Talking Out of Turn" (Lodge) – 5:00
3. "Driftwood" (Justin Hayward) – 4:32
4. "Never Comes the Day" (Hayward) – 4:41
5. "I'm Just a Singer (In a Rock and Roll Band)" (Lodge) – 4:18
6. "Gemini Dream" (Hayward, Lodge) – 3:53

Side two

1. "The Voice" (Hayward) – 4:16
2. "After You Came" (Graeme Edge) – 4:37
3. "Question" (Single edit) (Hayward) – 4:59
4. "Veteran Cosmic Rocker" (Ray Thomas) – 3:11
5. "Isn't Life Strange" (Lodge) – 6:04
6. "Nights in White Satin" (Single edit) (Hayward) – 4:27

=== American edition ===
Side one

1. "The Voice" – 4:14
2. "Question" (Single edit) – 4:55
3. "Veteran Cosmic Rocker" – 3:07
4. "Isn't Life Strange" – 6:00
5. "Nights in White Satin" (Single edit) – 4:25

Side two

1. "Ride My See-Saw" – 3:42
2. "Driftwood" – 4:29
3. "Sitting at the Wheel" – 5:38
4. "I'm Just a Singer (In a Rock and Roll Band)" – 4:15
5. "Gemini Dream" – 3:47

=== Canadian edition ===
Side one

1. "Ride My See-Saw" (John Lodge) – 3:37
2. "Driftwood" (Justin Hayward) – 4:31
3. "Sitting at the Wheel" (Lodge) – 5:35
4. "Never Comes the Day" (Hayward) – 4:39
5. "I'm Just a Singer (In a Rock and Roll Band)" (Lodge) – 4:16
6. "Gemini Dream" (Hayward, Lodge) – 3:46

Side two

1. "The Voice" (Hayward) – 4:16
2. "After You Came" (Graeme Edge) – 4:35
3. "Question" (Single edit) (Hayward) – 4:55
4. "Veteran Cosmic Rocker" (Ray Thomas) – 3:09
5. "Isn't Life Strange" (Lodge) – 6:03
6. "Nights in White Satin" (Single edit) (Hayward) – 3:06

== Charts ==
Chart performance for Voices in the Sky: The Best of the Moody Blues
Chart (1985)	Peak position
Canada Top Albums/CDs (RPM)	91
US Billboard 200	132
