= Meanwhile (The Moody Blues song) =

1981 song by the Moody Blues

Song by The Moody Blues

from the album Long Distance Voyager
- Released: 15 May 1981
- Recorded: February–March 1980
- Genre: Progressive rock
- Length: 4:08
- Label: Threshold
- Songwriter(s): Justin Hayward
- Producer(s): Pip Williams

"Meanwhile" is a song written by Justin Hayward that was released on the Moody Blues 1981 album Long Distance Voyager. Although never released as a single, it reached #11 on the Billboard Mainstream Rock chart.

== Recording ==
"Meanwhile" was one of the first songs recorded for Long Distance Voyager, in February and March 1980. Hayward originally prepared the basic track in his home studio. According to Hayward:

I think I was probably influenced by knowing that Pip [Williams] was going to do the album, knowing that he'd done Status Quo, and having this song around...I thought "That's great; it's in the Status Quo tempo. That's perfect for it." However, it didn't turn out anything like Status Quo: it just sounded like the Moody Blues.

According to producer Pip Williams, "This was a serious happening track from Day One...There is something very seductive – musically – about songs that comprise any form of suspended chord structure of 'hanging in the air' feeling."

== Lyrics and music ==
The lyrics of the song are about the singer coming to terms with having "let love slip through my fingers." Music journalist Geoffrey Freakes described "Meanwhile" as "a breezy acoustic guitar and electric piano-led tune that recalls Gerry Rafferty's "Get It Right Next Time". Freakes praised the "simple but effective" drums and bass guitar, as well as the electric guitar bridge but felt that the music of the "jaunty chorus" was inconsistent with the resignation of the lyrics.

Hayward plays both a 6-string and 12-string acoustic guitar on the song, as well as a Gibson 335 electric guitar, and a mandolin for the refrains. Pat Moraz plays an electric piano for most of the song, but also added a "swelling backwards piano chord" in the final verse, and plays what Williams described as "an Emerson, Lake and Palmer-type MiniMoog synthesizer" in the refrain. John Lodge plays bass and Graeme Edge plays drums.

Allmusic critic Dave Connolley described "Meanwhile" as a "pop-oriented, beat-driven romantic ballad".

== Reception ==
Fort Lauderdale News critic Cameron Cohick regarded "Meanwhile" as the best song on Long Distance Voyager. The Daily Record critic Jim Bohen praised it as being "bouncy and tuneful" and one of the best songs on the album. Columbia Record critic Tom Priddy also found it to be one of the best songs on the album, and said it "could have come directly from [the Moody Blues 1960s classic album] Days of Future Past." Billboard's review of the album listed "Meanwhile" as one of the "best cuts". Billboard contributor Ed Harrison also described it as a "mid-tempo track punctuated with intriguing lyrics and an uncluttered arrangement." Sacramento Bee critic Bob Sylva praised its "bluesy piano beat."

Detroit Free Press critic Bruce Britt called it "an uncompromising assessment of love gone sour." The Star Press critic Kim Teverbaugh described it as a "love lost song." The Age writer Mike Daly called it a "pulsing medium-rock ballad, with Hayward's vocals and multiple acoustic guitars." Atlanta Constitution writer Bill King found "Meanwhile" to be "less memorable" than other ballads on Long Distance Voyager.

Although "Meanwhile" was not released as a single, it received significant play on album-oriented rock radio stations in the U.S. and reached #11 on the Billboard Mainstream Rock chart on 12 September 1981.

Hayward had wanted "Meanwhile to be released as the lead single from Long Distance Voyager but the record executives chose to release "Gemini Dream" because they felt a feistier song would make a better lead single. After "The Voice" was released as the album's second single, Hayward and Kip Krones, who was the British liaison for the Moody Blues manager Jerry Weintraub, wanted to release "Meanwhile" as the third single from Long Distance Voyager but "Talking Out of Turn" was released instead. Hayward said "Kip always said it should have been the single, but nobody else saw it like that. It was also my choice...although various factors altered that decision."

== Live ==
The Moody Blues played "Meanwhile" live on their Long Distance Voyager tour and then brought back into their setlist for their 2011 tour.
