= Running Water (song) =

1983 Moody Blues single

Single by the Moody Blues

from the album The Present
- B-side: "Under My Feet"
- Released: December 1983
- Recorded: 1982
- Length: 3:21
- Label: Threshold
- Songwriter: Justin Hayward
- Producer: Pip Williams

The Moody Blues singles chronology
"Sitting at the Wheel" (1983)	"Running Water" (1983)	"Your Wildest Dreams" (1986)

"Running Water" is a song written by Justin Hayward that was first released on the Moody Blues' 1983 album The Present. It was released as the third single from the album in the United States but did not chart.

== Recording ==
Hayward first played a version of "Running Water" for producer Pip Williams during a break from the recording of The Present. Only four of the five members of the Moody Blues appear on the recording – Ray Thomas was not involved. Each band member appearing on the song recorded his part separately. Hayward plays guitar and a Casio synthesizer, John Lodge plays bass guitar, Graeme Edge plays drums, and Pat Moraz provides the synthesized string section.

Williams felt that "Running Water" was Hayward's best song on The Present but was disappointed that it didn't have much participation from the other band members. He was also disappointed with the sound produced by the Casio synthesizer, saying:

In retrospect, it is my feeling that the cheap Casio synth makes the track sound somewhat cold, even though I was in agreement [with using it] at the time. In fairness, Justin had composed the song on this little instrument, and it was hard to pull away from that sound when the time came to record the track properly. It's also possible that more emotional and "warm" feeling would have been injected had the song been performed by the whole band.

== Music and lyrics ==
"Running Water" is a ballad that is highlighted by Hayward's "gentle" acoustic guitar and the synthesized orchestrations. Music journalist Geoffrey Freakes felt that the keyboard refrain sounds a little like the Moody Blues song "The Day We Meet Again", also written by Hayward, from the 1978 album Octave. Freakes described the music as being "reassuringly old fashioned" so that it "strikes a chord with fans of a certain age."

The lyrics of "Running Water" are about time moving on. The song opens with the line "Time hurries on/Look and it's gone" and the chorus includes lines such as "Oh running water/Don't throw your love away/We live to love another day." According to Pittsburgh Press critic Ron Weiskind, the song "acknowledges life's inevitable changes but with a stately sadness that assures the world will go on." Hayward had previously explored these themes on the single "Driftwood" from Octave.

== Reception ==
Rolling Stone critic Errol Somay felt that "Running Water" was one of the songs on The Present where "the Moody Blues are at their creative best." Freakes described the chorus as being "simply gorgeous", but felt the song may have been too subtle to be successful as a single. AllMusic critic Dave Connolly described it as a "lush ballad" that requires several listens to sink in. Bernardsville News critic Charles T. Zavalick described it as a pretty love song with "lofty vocals", but also "a challenging song that dares to be poetically disassembled while remaining vaguely open for individual interpretation. Manchester Evening News writer Tony Jasper called it a "gem" and said that it is "seen as something rivaling [the Moody Blues'] long-time classic 'Nights in White Satin.'" San Jose Mercury News critic Andrew Slater called it "lush and luscious, with an unobstrusive approach that is almost obtrusive after a while."

The Berkshire Eagle critic Steve Leon described "Running Water" and "Driftwood" as "ballads that tug at the heartstrings but ooze with the sticky sweetness of a melting fudgesicle." Star Tribune critic Jon Bream described it as "just another silly love song." Barry Leighton of The Evening Advertiser felt "Running Water" was an example of "wimpy, viscous mush" Hayward sometimes was writing.

== Single release ==
Williams felt that "Running Water" and "Under My Feet" were the two songs from The Present that were most likely to become hit singles, comparing "Running Water" to "Nights in White Satin." Although some music critics felt that "Meet Me Halfway" should have been the third single from the album, following "Blue World" and "Sitting at the Wheel", "Running Water was released in the US as the third single in December 1983, with "Under My Feet" as the b-side. The single did not chart.

== Live ==
"Running Water" was included in the set list of the Moody Blues' live concerts during The Present tour. Lodge played it on a two-necked instrument that combined both a bass and six string guitar. Several concert reviewers, such as Tim McGraw, felt that the song was one of several that slowed the concert down. McGraw wrote in The Kansas City Star that "Running Water" "turned out to be as boring in concert as...on the [album]." Detroit Free Press critic Gary Graff said that the song "managed to drag things down." Edmonton Journal reviewer Teresa Mazzitelli wrote that "this introspective, mellow sound grew too restful and soon after, edged its way to tiresome".
