= Blue World (The Moody Blues song) =

1983 Moody Blues single

Single by the Moody Blues

from the album The Present
- B-side: "Going Nowhere" (UK); "Sorry" (US)
- Released: 12 August 1983 (UK); 16 August 1983 (US)
- Recorded: 8 March – 10 December 1982
- Genre: Pop rock
- Length: 5:20 (Album version); 3:38 (Single version)
- Label: Threshold
- Songwriter: Justin Hayward
- Producer: Pip Williams

The Moody Blues singles chronology
"Talking Out of Turn" (1981)	"Blue World" (1983)	"Sitting at the Wheel" (1983)

"Blue World" is a 1983 single by the Moody Blues written by Justin Hayward. It was first released in the UK as the lead single of the album The Present in August 1983. It was released as a single in the US in the fall of 1983. "Blue World" was one of three singles from The Present, with the others being "Sitting at the Wheel" and "Running Water". The single's cover is a pastiche of the painting Daybreak by Maxfield Parrish.

== Writing and recording ==
Hayward first recorded "Blue World" as a demo in is home studio, utilizing a LinnDrum drum machine. The final recording by the band also used the LinnDrum. Producer Pip Williams said:

Justin wrote the song and prepared a demo at home with exactly the same verse/chorus structure as the finished product. He was using one of the new cutting-edge drum machines, the original LinnDrum. It was a pretty startling innovation at the time, and really freed songwriters to make much better demos at home. In fact, the single Linn bass drum, snare and hi-hat pattern that Justin had programmed for "Blue World" was kept right through the song, with the addition of some extra programmed percussion (congas, cowbell, cabasa and tambourine). We did try it with Graeme [Edge] playing real kit, but Jus preferred that metronomic machine groove, which does work well with Patrick [Moraz'] bass line. Those early Linn drums were less than convincing when playing fills, however, and apart from hi-hats, they had no cymbals, so Graeme played all the drum fills and cymbal crashes.

Hayward played several guitars on the track, including a 6-string acoustic guitar and his electric Gibson 335. Williams contributed a 12-string acoustic guitar and John Lodge played bass guitar. Moraz played the synthesizer, including the bass line, synthesized string instruments and flute-like trills. Hayward sings all the vocals.

== Music and lyrics ==
Music journalist Geoffrey Freakes described "Blue World" as "bright" and "upbeat". Moody Blues biographer Marc Cushman felt that Moraz' synthesized bass line was the most effective aspect of the song, and that the synthesized strings were also effective. However, he noted that listeners were split on flute-like trills, with some listeners liking them but others finding them "unnecessary and unwelcome". The chorus does not come in until two minutes into the song.

Philadelphia Daily News critic Jonathan Takiff said that the lyrics show Hayward to be "the perennial melancholy man, decrying the 'Blue World' out there." Freakes felt that the lyrics echo the artwork on the album's and single's cover. Jeff Segal of The Michigan Daily described the lyrics as "mystical, if dumb."

== Reception ==
Jim Zebora of the Record-Journal said it was "among the best and most likeable of any [songs] the band has done in years." The Morning Call said that "'Blue World', with its heavy bass line and Hayward's rather mechanical vocal, will please (momentarily) pseudo new-wavers." Gazette critic Dick Hogan considered "Blue World" as one of the best songs on The Present and particularly praised Hayward's smooth lead vocal and "imaginative lyrics", as well as the band's harmony vocals and Ray Thomas' "soaring flute." Boston Globe critic Brett Milano called it a "soaring, melodic number with a heartfelt vocal."

News-Pilot critic Michael Davis called it "a fine medium tempo song reminiscent of a good Paul McCartney solo tune brimming with unique sounds and unexpected melodies. Jim Sanville of the Evening Express called it "an ear catching pop number" and "the type of song strong enough to provide momentum" to the Moody Blues into the 1980s. Rolling Stone critic Errol Somay felt that "Blue World" was one of the songs on The Present where "the Moody Blues are at their creative best."

Jim Bohen of the Daily Record said that the song "serves up a likeable tune and a mildly philosophical lyric to a soft-rock beat and billowing synthesizer accompaniment." Memphis Press-Scimitar critic Bill E. Burk said it has a "smooth, melodic structure fit within a rock framework." Bernardsville News critic Charles T. Zavalick found it to be "spiritually uplifting".

In The Kansas City Star, Tim McGraw complained about the song's "sophomoric lyricism", asking "How many times can the message that the world is unjust and lacks compassion be regurgitated without people failing to take it seriously." The Age found "Blue World" to be "soporific" and a "[clone] of umpteen old Moody Blues ballads." Allan McQuillan of the Western Daily Press called the single "quick, slick, soft and well produced but without much to remember it by."

Ultimate Classic Rock critic Nick DeRiso rated it as the Moody Blues' 8th greatest song.

== Charts ==
"Blue World" was a moderate success for the Moody Blues in the U.S., charting at No. 32 on the Mainstream Rock chart, and at No. 62 on the Billboard Hot 100 chart. In the UK it reached No. 35 and in Canada it reached No. 40.

== Live ==
"Blue World" was included in the Moody Blues live set list for a few years, generally appearing in the latter part of the show.

== Personnel ==
- Justin Hayward – vocals, guitar
- John Lodge – bass guitar
- Graeme Edge – drums
- Patrick Moraz – keyboards
