= Sitting at the Wheel =

1983 Moody Blues single

Single by the Moody Blues

from the album The Present
- B-side: "Sorry" (UK); "Going Nowhere" (US)
- Released: 19 August 1983
- Recorded: 8 March – 10 December 1982
- Genre: New wave
- Length: 5:40 (album); 3:30 (single edit); 7:32 (Germany 12-inch single remix)
- Label: Threshold
- Songwriter(s): John Lodge
- Producer(s): Pip Williams

The Moody Blues singles chronology
"Blue World" (1983)	"Sitting at the Wheel" (1983)	"Running Water" (1983)

"Sitting at the Wheel" is a 1983 hit single by the Moody Blues, written by John Lodge. It was released in the US as the lead-off single from The Present in August 1983 and debuted on the Billboard Hot 100 on September 3, 1983. In the UK, "Sitting at the Wheel" was released in November 1983 as the second single from The Present, following "Blue World".

== Music and lyrics ==
Producer Pip Williams felt that "Sitting at the Wheel" was the most commercial song on The Present and the album's "only out-and-out rocker". Frank Rizzo of the Hartford Courant considered it the album's "one hard-driving pop song." Bill E. Burk of the Memphis Press-Scimitar described it as an "up-tempo rocker".

The song uses a LinnDrum for most of the drum sound but Moody Blues drummer Graeme Edge reinforced the sound with real drums and cymbals. Lodge plays a 12-string acoustic guitar as well as bass guitar and Pat Moraz plays keyboards. Justin Hayward did not take part in the initial recording of the basic track of the song, but later added electric rhythm guitar on a Gibson 335 and Williams later added a slide guitar part.

Moody Blues biographer Marc Cushman described the lyrics as "more of those mystical, spiritually inclined, highly interpretable Moody Blues lyrics. Philadelphia Daily News critic Jonathan Takiff said that in the lyrics Lodge "still is promoting his nose-to-the-grindstone keep-on-pushin' philosophy."

== Reception ==
Cash Box said "Sitting at the Wheel" was worth the long wait since the Moody Blues' previous US single, "The Voice", and that "bright, brassy keyboard flourishes give ELO-style orchestration and pumping bass rhythms a strong forward thrust." Pittsburgh Press critic Pete Bishop considered it "one of the best rockers [the Moody Blues have] ever done". Jim Zebora of the Record-Journal said it was "among the best and most likeable of any [songs] the band has done in years." Gazette critic Dick Hogan praised Hayward's "spirited" lead guitar and Moraz' "soaring synthesizer runs" and said that "vocally, the song borders on some of ELO's more recent tunes." The Morning Call said that "'Sitting at the Wheel', with its speedy rhythm, catchy lyrics and honky tonk piano...is perfect for AM/FM radio drive time." AllMusic critic Dave Connolly called it the album's "most invigorating track". Hamilton Spectator critic Paul Benedetti called it a "competent pop/rock tune indistinguishable from a dozen others on the charts."

In the Kansas City Star, Tim McGraw complained of the song's commercialism, saying that it "has about as much thought as any number of the Electric Light Orchestra's pounding 12-bar rockers". Brett Milano of The Boston Globe said the song "could be Electric Light Orchestra on a bad day." Jim Angell of the Tri-City Herald called it a "rather cliche rocker featuring Jackson Browne-like guitar work by Hayward". Tim McCarthey of the Salt Lake Tribune considered it to be "bland". Steve Pond of the Los Angeles Times found it to be "awkward". Music journalist Geoffrey Freakes felt it was "one of Lodge's most misjudged efforts." Freakes acknowledged that it's "lively in a foot-stomping way" but said that it's "a curious hybrid of synth-pop (the reverb-heavy drum sound and Eurythmics style synth) and rock 'n' roll (Lodge's energetic echo-laden chorus and [Pat] Moraz' Fats Domino-inspired boogie-woogie piano)."

"Sitting at the Wheel" peaked at No. 27 on the Billboard Hot 100 and No. 3 on the Billboard Mainstream Rock chart. In Canada it reached No. 18. It peaked at No. 91 in the UK.

== Live ==
"Sitting at the Wheel" was frequently the opening song of concerts on the Moody Blues tour supporting The Present.

== Personnel ==
- Justin Hayward – vocals, guitar
- John Lodge – vocals, bass guitar
- Graeme Edge – drums
- Patrick Moraz – keyboards
