= 22,000 Days =

Moody Blues song released in 1981

Single by The Moody Blues

from the album Long Distance Voyager
- A-side: "The Voice"
- Released: 23 July 1981
- Recorded: Spring 1980
- Genre: Progressive rock, new wave
- Length: 5:25 (album version); 4:58 (single version)
- Label: Threshold
- Songwriter(s): Graeme Edge
- Producer(s): Pip Williams

"22,000 Days" is a song written by Graeme Edge that was first released by the Moody Blues on their 1981 album Long Distance Voyager. It was also released as the B-side to the top-ten single "The Voice". "22,000 Days" reached No. 38 on the Billboard Top Rock Tracks chart.

== Recording ==
A version of "22,000 Days" was one of the first songs recorded for Long Distance Voyager, in February and March 1980. The group felt it could be done better and so it was re-recorded in the Spring of that year.

== Lyrics and music ==
The lyrics of "22,000 Days" exhort the listener to live life to the full and not waste time because we only have limited time to live. 22,000 days amount to a little more than 60 years. Edge said of the relatively short lifespan implied by the song:

That's one of those things where you mess around with a calculator, and you work out various things. And I worked out how many days; you know, just given an average lifespan of 70 years. And it came out to something that really shook me, something like 23,927 days. But I changed it to 22,000 days because it seemed better. Twenty-two thousand days is 66 1/2 years. And if you figure, well, maybe the first five or six years you aren't going to be worth much, and the last five or six years you aren't going to be worth much, it works out that your useful life is about 22,000 days. And that really surprised me because that doesn't seem much...If you do too much and have a day's hangover, you've wasted 1/22,000 of your life. And all of a sudden the days start getting more valuable.

Music journalist Geoffrey Freakes described "22,000 Days " as having a "Led Zeppelin-influenced intro, with Edge playing a "John Bonham-like stomp" on the drums. Freakes also praised Pat Moraz's "inventive keyboard fills" as well as his keyboard solo in the middle of the song. Moraz said:

For that song I actually wrote that riff; I wrote the whole instrumental part. That was a modulation in A-minor of a song I had written which was the main part of "Children's Concerto". So, although the song is credited to Graeme Edge alone, it was a collaboration. But I didn't want to start creating any problems by asking for credit, or anything like that. I was happy to be part of the group.

The lead vocals of the verses are sung by Justin Hayward and John Lodge with Ray Thomas also in the mix, and all three sing equally in on the refrain. Producer Pip Williams said:

The choruses were the first vocals on "22,000 Days" to be recorded, with John, Ray and Justin all singing together around one microphone. They sang each different harmony part all together, in unison. I positioned them around the mike so that no one voice was dominant. All the voices thus sing all the harmonies, giving a powerful choir sound. Ray then recorded a main lead vocal track.

The song was originally recorded with Thomas singing the lead vocal in the verses, with a smoother melody than was on the final recording. Lodge later suggested that they sing the verses in a more staccato fashion, to be consistent with the percussion sound. Lodge and Hayward recorded the verse vocals in that manner, with Lodge's voice higher and thus more prominent, but Thomas's original vocal was included in the mix.

== Reception ==
Ottawa Citizen critic Bill Provick said that it "gives the band a good excuse to try out a bit of its multi-textured rock momentum and works quite well" Atlanta Constitution writer Bill King said it "makes good use of a heavy, almost military rhythm, Thomas' harmonica playing and a catchy chorus. The Daily Record critic Jim Bohen described it as "marching music for conquering Roman legions. Johnson City Press-Chronicle critic Elaine Cloud Goller said that it has "an urgent reminder not to let precious time be wasted, the heavy bass lines marking the metaphor of time marching on.

Billboard's review of the album listed "Meanwhile" as one of the "best cuts". Billboard contributor Ed Harrison called it "spirited" and said that it "highlights the second side [of Long Distance Voyager] and exemplifies the group's harmonic way with a song. Allmusic critic Dave Connolley described it as a "winning number" in which Edge "tries his hand successfully in some philosophizing worthy of [former Moody Blues member] Mike Pinder."

Fort Lauderdale News critic Cameron Cohick considered it to be a weak song. Creem reviewer Jim Farber said the song is "a lot of kvetching about how short a time we have to live."

Although "22,000 Days" was not released as a single A-side, it received significant airplay on adult-oriented rock radio stations and reached #38 on the Billboard Mainstream Rock chart.

== Live performances ==
"22,000 Days" was included in the Moody Blues' live setlists during their Long Distance Voyager tour.
