= Daybreak (painting) =

1922 painting by Maxfield Parrish

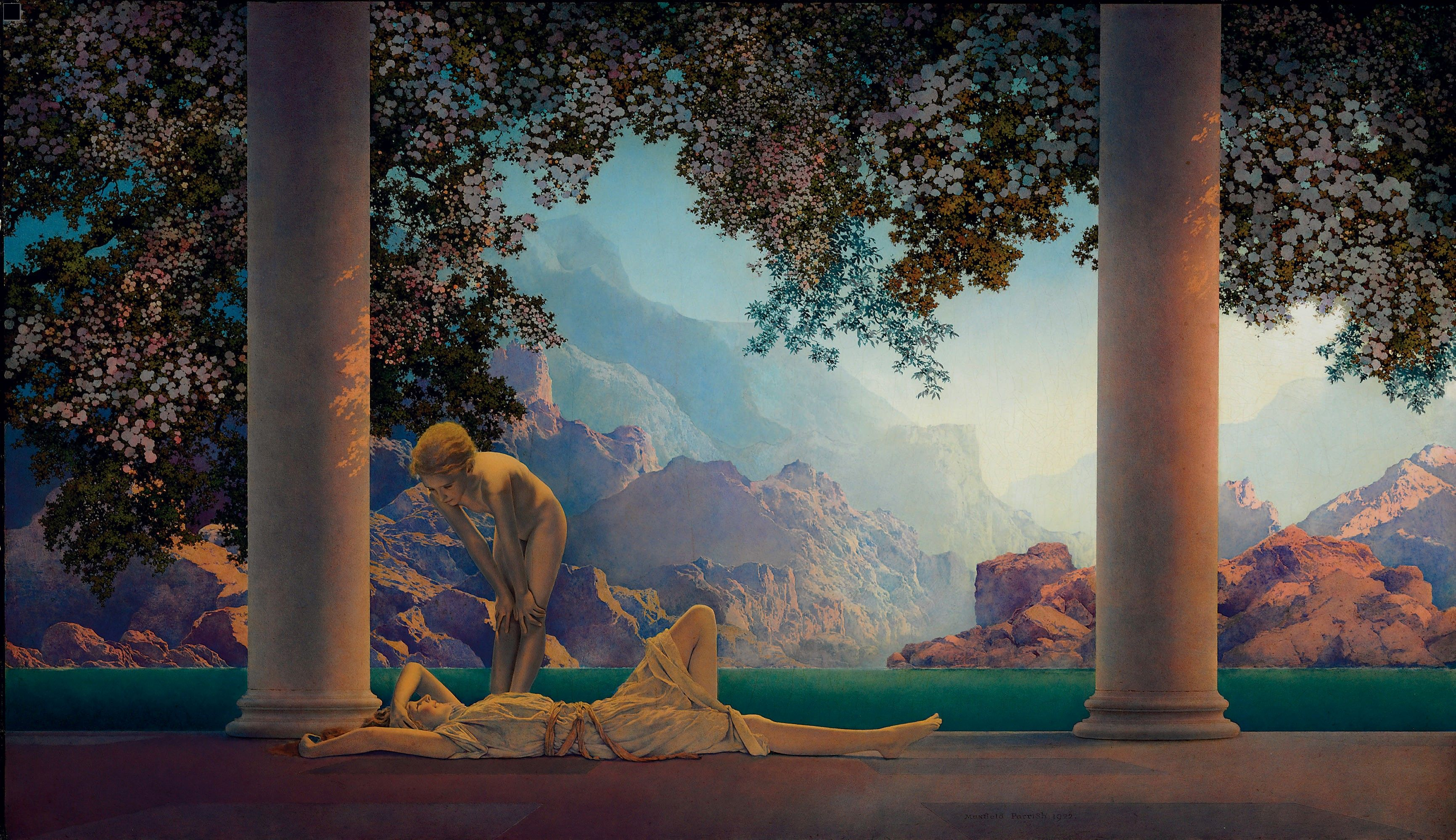
- Artist: Maxfield Parrish
- Year: 1922
- Dimensions: 67.3 cm × 114 cm (26.5 in × 45 in)

Daybreak is a painting by American artist Maxfield Parrish made in 1922. Daybreak, inspired by the landscape of Vermont and New Hampshire to create lush and romantic tones, is regarded as the most popular art print of the 20th century, based on number of prints made: one for every four American homes. According to the National Museum of American Illustration, it has outsold Andy Warhol's Campbell's Soup Cans and Leonardo's Last Supper. It is still in print. The painting is also part of the core of the neo-classical popular paintings that started to gain traction at the beginning of the 1920s. His work in his staple style was also popularized by the large scale murals he painted in the 1930s.

Parrish referred to Daybreak as his "great painting", the epitome of his work.

== Composition ==
Measuring 26.5 by 45 inches (67.3 cm × 114 cm), the painting employs a formal layout similar to a stage set, with two feminine figures. Painted using preparatory photographs, the models were his regular models, Kitty Owen (granddaughter of William Jennings Bryan), Parrish's daughter Jean, and Susan Lewin. Only two figures appear in the completed painting, though pencil studies and negative space indicate that the artist originally intended a third near the righthand column. The composition is arranged on the principle of "dynamic symmetry" popularized by Jay Hambidge.

== Medium and technique ==
Referred to by the artist as "the great painting", "Daybreak" is an oil painting resembling a stage set in its composition.

== Record purchase price ==
The painting has always been in private ownership. On May 25, 2006, Daybreak was purchased by a private collector (Mel Gibson's then-wife, Robyn) at auction at Christie's for US $7.6 million. This set a record price for a Parrish painting. It was sold again on May 21, 2010, for US$5.2 million.

== In popular culture ==
- The 1992 Arcade title The Karate Tournament features a background inspired by Daybreak, featuring the two iconic sun-kissed pillars, a line of water behind it, and densely-detailed mountains and cliffs in the back, with the same use of layered & saturated colors in the shadowing.
- In 1995, Michael Jackson produced a music video, "You Are Not Alone", featuring himself and his then wife, Lisa Marie Presley, in which they appear semi-nude in emulation of Daybreak.
- The Dalis Car 1984 album The Waking Hour features a detail from Daybreak on its sleeve.
- Both the song "Blue World" (1983) and the album The Present (1983) by English rock band The Moody Blues make use of a pastiche of Daybreak.
- The Saint Preux album The Last Opera also uses Daybreak for its cover.
