= National Analysts =

American marketing research company

NAXION, previously known as National Analysts Worldwide, is an American marketing research company that originally worked as a division of the Curtis Publishing Company. It was founded by Charles Coolidge Parlin in 1911. Donald M. Hobart, the future head of the division, joined in 1923, though he ended up resigning from the company in 1928 because he desired to work on the selling side of the concept. He was asked to rejoin the company and become the head of the division in 1938 after Parlin had decided to retire. It is considered to be the "first commercial research company" ever formed. It became an independent organization in 1943 in order to "provide research services to industry and government."

== History ==
=== As NAXION ===
NAXION is the new name for National Analysts Worldwide, a market research/marketing research and consulting company. The firm was formed in 1911 when Curtis Publishing Company hired Charles Coolidge Parlin to oversee the Division of Commercial Research and conduct research that would help manufacturers understand their customers in the newly emerging consumer economy. The goal was to encourage manufacturing companies to make more effective use of advertising in Curtis publications like The Saturday Evening Post and The Ladies Home Journal, both of which would go on to have a major impact on 20th Century popular culture. It is considered to be the "first commercial research company" ever formed. It became an independent corporation, a wholly owned subsidiary of Curtis in 1943 in order to "provide research services to industry and government." In 1970, it was purchased by Booz Allen Hamilton, a consulting firm then seeking to expand its role in the marketing services arena. Two Booz Allen Hamilton officers, Susan Schwartz McDonald and John Berrigan, purchased the firm in 1992, and with Berrigan's retirement in 2004, ownership was restructured as an ESOP under the leadership of McDonald, CEO. In 2006, the firm changed its name to National Analysts Worldwide. In June 2014, the firm changed its name to NAXION to better reflect its expanding 21st century capabilities and affirm its global reach.

Standard techniques like probability sampling, and concepts like focus groups, were either developed at National Analysts or saw some of their earliest application. Select other contributions to the industry include:

- modern qualitative research techniques including some of the earliest focus groups on record
- predictive modeling techniques
- optimization modeling
- hierarchical segmentation models and use of multi-criteria cluster techniques
- sampling techniques including invention of Area Probability Sampling

=== Today ===
More than a full century after its inception, NAXION remains headquartered in Philadelphia, PA, and operating as a hybrid marketing research and consulting firm. It employs 80 professionals full time. It consistently ranks amongst the Honomichl Top 50, the largest U.S. research firms. Industries served include: healthcare, pharmaceuticals, communications, technology, media, energy, financial services, residential design, transportation, B2B and consumer products. Service Capabilities include:

- Brand Strategy
- Demand Forecasting
- Market Surveillance
- Segmentation
- Product Development
- Pricing
- Market Entry Strategy
- Brand Equity Assessment
- Positioning
- Customer Insight
