= Long Distance Voyager =

Studio album by the Moody Blues
- Released: 15 May 1981
- Recorded: 19 February 1980 – 14 April 1981
- Studios: Threshold and RAK, London
- Genres: Synth-pop; symphonic rock
- Length: 46:32
- Label: Threshold
- Producer: Pip Williams

The Moody Blues chronology
Octave (1978)	Long Distance Voyager (1981)	The Present (1983)

Singles from Long Distance Voyager
- 1. "Gemini Dream" Released: May 1981; 2. "The Voice" Released: July 1981; 3. "Talking Out of Turn" Released: November 1981

Professional ratings
Review scores
Source	Rating
AllMusic	4/5 stars
Rolling Stone	4/5 stars

Long Distance Voyager is the tenth album by the Moody Blues, first released in May 1981 on the group's Threshold record label. It was the group's first album featuring keyboardist Patrick Moraz (who previously had worked with bands such as Refugee and Yes) in place of co-founder Mike Pinder, who left after the Octave album in 1978.

Upon release in 1981, Long Distance Voyager became the Moody Blues' second American number one album, and was also the source of the US Top 20 singles "Gemini Dream" (No. 12) and "The Voice" (No. 15) on the Billboard Hot 100. A third single, "Talking Out of Turn", only reached No. 65 on the Billboard Hot 100 but reached No. 27 in Canada. It also continued the Moody Blues' winning streak in their native United Kingdom, reaching No. 7 there.

Besides the singles, two songs from the album charted on Billboard's Mainstream Rock chart. "Meanwhile" charted at No. 11 and "22,000 Days" charted at No. 38.

In November 2008, the album was remastered and released on CD with one extra track.

== Writing ==
According to Ray Thomas, "Most people think Long Distance Voyager was named after the cosmic themes that dominate our music. But in fact we were simply describing ourselves." John Lodge stated, "The Long Distance Voyager album is about people. Although the title is very space-oriented, it isn't. The whole idea is we are the same as we were a hundred years ago, two hundred years ago. It's about people and situations and feelings, and talking out of turn is a particular feeling." The final three tracks comprise a mini-suite that combines themes of carnival jesters and the chaos experienced backstage at a rock show.

Guitarist Justin Hayward recalls writing "The Voice": "It was the first thing we recorded for Long Distance Voyager. I used to feel a lot of guilt about our position in the world and that we were really privileged, and that went into the song. Long Distance Voyager was a huge milestone for us. There was a time after the Octave album where we didn't quite know how to make things work. We were all a bit nervous. Long Distance Voyager really came together and we had a number one album. "The Voice" and "Gemini Dream" were both hits".

Bassist Lodge remembers the inspiration for "Gemini Dream", and how the production of the album built the band's excitement to go on tour once again: "We had stopped touring with the Moody Blues in 1974, I think it was. In 1980, we had an album called Long Distance Voyager and we were going to go on the road after it was done. We had not recorded the album yet, but we knew we were going into the studio to record it soon. I came up with the idea we needed a song that said we were are back on the road. The original song was called 'Touring in the USA.' That was the original demo when we were putting it together. As we were writing it together, we suddenly realized what we were actually talking about, and that is when you're a musician, you're either on the road, as a Moody Blue, or you're at home, as anyone else. It was just trying to combine the two things together that are the same person living two different lives."

Graeme Edge's "22,000 Days" was inspired by his reflection on the number of days in a typical lifetime. He explains, "I worked out how many days [are in] an average lifespan of 70 years. And it came out to something that really shook me, something like 23,927 days. But I changed it to 22,000 days because it seemed better. Twenty-two thousand days is 66 and a half years. And if you figure, well, maybe the first five or six years you aren't going to be worth much, and the last five or six years you aren't going to be worth much, it works out that your useful life is about 22,000 days. And that really surprised me because that doesn't seem much. And I did a lot of tests on people and I'd say 'give me a quick answer'. I was getting back like a quarter of a million, two million. People think they have so many days to live. See, 70 years, everybody knows, it doesn't really register. If you do too much and have a day's hangover, you've wasted 1/22,000 of your life. And all of a sudden the days start getting more valuable."

"Veteran Cosmic Rocker" was inspired by a phrase an interviewer used to describe song's writer, Ray Thomas. He remembers, "Some reporter from The New York Times came to one our gigs in the States and he referred to me as the 'Veteran Cosmic Rocker'. At the time I thought 'Bloody cheek. I'm not veteran.' And then I thought 'That sounds good actually.' So I nicked it and wrote that song."

== Recording ==
The songs on Long Distance Voyager were recorded at the band's own Threshold Studios. The songs were recorded and mixed by Greg Jackman, while Pip Williams was the album's producer. Supplementing the Moody Blues—Justin Hayward, John Lodge, Ray Thomas, Graeme Edge, and Patrick Moraz—was a string section performed by the New World Philharmonic, which Pip Williams arranged.

John Lodge remembers the sessions: "Long Distance Voyager changed everything again, because that album went to number one in America. I think we have three or four singles off that album, and it was our first album recorded in our own studio in London as well. We built Westlake Audio Studio to do, but it was the only album ever made at that studio by The Moody Blues."

== Album cover ==
The cover for the album was based on a painting entitled Punch (1840) by Thomas Webster printed for the Art Union of Glasgow, while the sleeve was based on a concept by the Moody Blues which was designed by Cream, who were in charge of the album's cover artwork. NASA's Voyager spacecraft is at the top of the front side of the album cover. Both Voyager 1 and Voyager 2's flybys of Saturn were in the news in 1980–81.

== Reception ==
Billboard said that "the group is in prime form here with a knockout collection of gorgeous melodies, harmonies and poetic lyrics". Billboard contributor Ed Harrison said that "'Long Distance Voyager,' though bending somewhat to commercial pop trends, still manages to recreate the group's lushly textured, classical/rock symphonic sound epitomized by classics like 'Nights In White Satin,' 'Ride My See-Saw,' 'Question' and others." Cash Box called it "a nice return to vinyl" for the Moody Blues, commenting on the "luxurious, symphonic rock setting on songs like 'In My World,' 'Talking Out of Turn' and '22,000 Days'", and noting that "the patented Moody Blues group vocal is also in fine form and, surprisingly, sounds perfectly contemporary."

== Track listing ==
Side one
No.	Title	Writer(s)	Lead vocals	Length
1.	"The Voice"	Justin Hayward	Hayward	5:21
2.	"Talking Out of Turn"	John Lodge	Lodge	7:18
3.	"Gemini Dream"	Hayward, Lodge	Hayward, Lodge	4:09
4.	"In My World"	Hayward	Hayward	7:22

Side two
No.	Title	Writer(s)	Lead vocals	Length
1.	"Meanwhile"	Hayward	Hayward	4:08
2.	"22,000 Days"	Edge	Thomas, Hayward, Lodge	5:25
3.	"Nervous"	Lodge	Lodge	5:45
4.	"Painted Smile"	Ray Thomas	Thomas	3:18
5.	"Reflective Smile"	Thomas	Dave Symonds	0:36
6.	"Veteran Cosmic Rocker"	Thomas	Thomas	3:18

2008 remaster CD expanded edition
No.	Title	Writer(s)	Lead vocals	Length
11.	"The Voice" (single edit)	Hayward	Hayward	4:17

== Personnel ==
- Justin Hayward – vocals, guitars
- John Lodge – vocals, bass guitar
- Ray Thomas – vocals, flute, harmonica
- Graeme Edge – drums, percussion
- Patrick Moraz – keyboards, synthesizers, arrangements

=== Additional personnel ===
- B. J. Cole – pedal steel guitar on "In My World"
- New World Philharmonic – orchestrations
- Pip Williams – string arrangements and director of the orchestra
- Dave Symonds – spoken word

=== Production ===
- Pip Williams – producer, string arrangements
- Greg Jackman – recording engineer, mixing
- Norman Goodman – assistant to Greg Jackman
- Melvyn Abrahams – mastering
- Ted Jensen – mastering for US release
- Cream – sleeve design, artwork

== Charts ==
=== Weekly charts ===
Chart performance for Long Distance Voyager
Chart (1981)	Peak position
Australian Albums (Kent Music Report)	7
Canada Top Albums/CDs (RPM)	1
Dutch Albums (Album Top 100)	16
Finnish Albums (The Official Finnish Charts)	25
German Albums (Offizielle Top 100)	28
New Zealand Albums (RMNZ)	8
Norwegian Albums (VG-lista)	12
Swedish Albums (Sverigetopplistan)	46
UK Albums (Official Charts)	7
US Billboard 200	1

=== Year-end charts ===
Year-end chart performance for Long Distance Voyager
Chart (1981)	Peak position
Dutch Albums (Album Top 100)	92
New Zealand Albums (RMNZ)	34
US Billboard 200	27

== Certifications ==
Certifications for Long Distance Voyager
Region	Certification	Certified units/sales
Australia	—	40,000
Canada (Music Canada)	3× Platinum	300,000^{^}
United Kingdom (BPI)	Silver	60,000^{^}
United States (RIAA)	Platinum	1,000,000^{^}
^{^} Shipments figures based on certification alone.
