= The Dream Garden =

1916 mosaic by Maxfield Parrish and Louis Comfort Tiffany

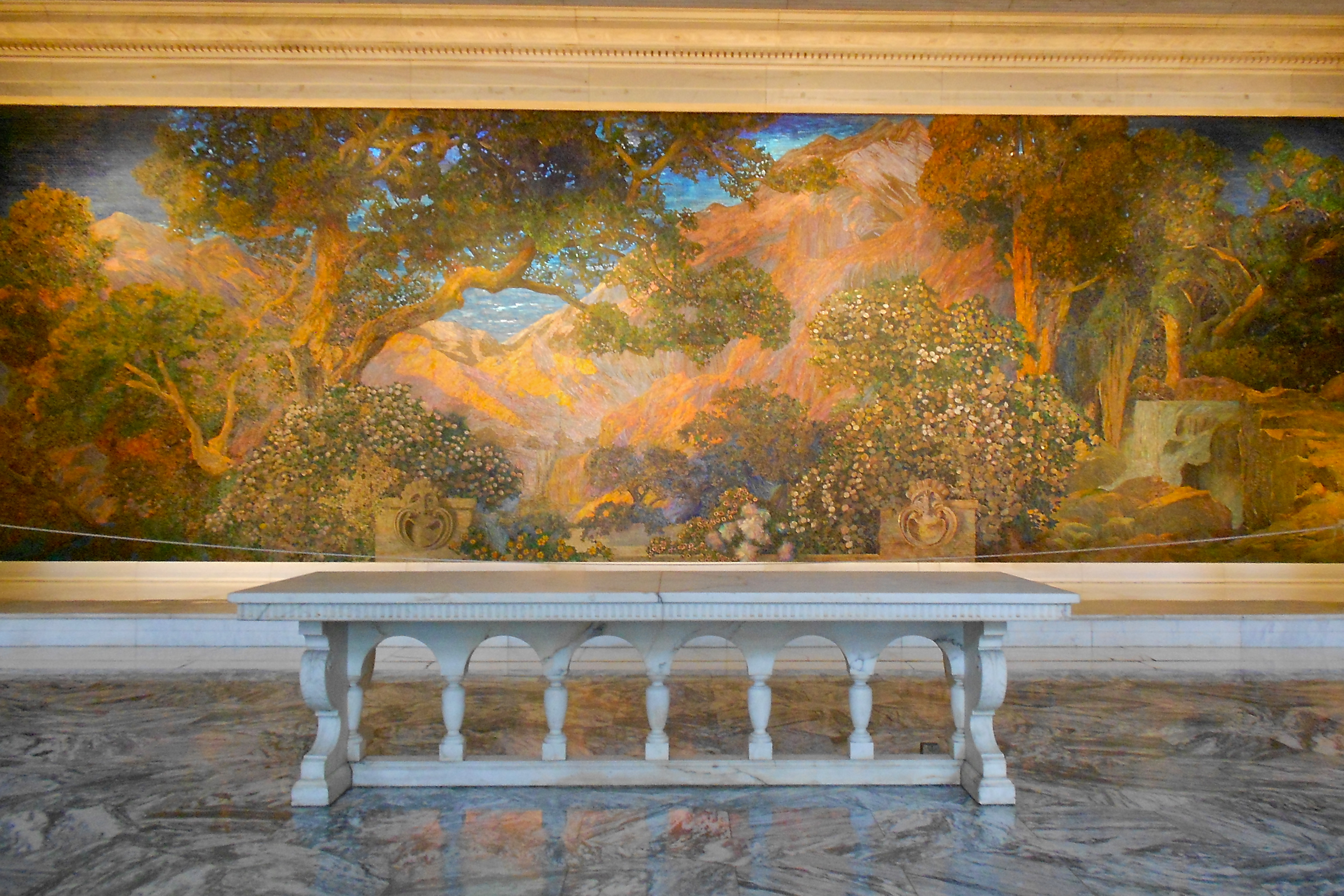
- Artist: Maxfield Parrish and Louis Comfort Tiffany
- Year: 1916
- Medium: Mosaic
- Location: The Curtis Center; Philadelphia, Pennsylvania, U.S.

The Dream Garden is a 1916 mosaic mural by Maxfield Parrish and Louis Comfort Tiffany. It is located in the lobby of the Curtis Building which is the former headquarters of the Curtis Publishing Company. The Curtis Center, as it is now known, is located at 6th and Walnut Streets adjacent to Independence Square in Philadelphia, Pennsylvania. The mural was designed by Parrish and made by Louis Comfort Tiffany. It is their only collaboration. The work was commissioned by the Edward Bok, Senior Executive Editor of Curtis Publishing's Ladies' Home Journal, under the aegis of the head of the company Cyrus Curtis.

The mosaic is 15 feet (4.6 m) long by 49 feet (15 m) wide and contains more than 100,000 favrile glass tesserae and greater than 260 color tones.

The mural made its national debut at Tiffany Studios in Corona, Queens in New York City, where more than 7,000 people came to see it.

In 1998, the casino mogul Steve Wynn wanted to purchase the mosaic mural and move it to Las Vegas. This led to a public uproar led by among others the Historical Commission of Philadelphia. Subsequently, the Mayor of Philadelphia Ed Rendell nominated it to become the City of Brotherly Love's first 'historic object'. Thereafter the Pew Charitable Trust came forward with $3.5 million to purchase the work. The ownership of the work was given to the nearby Pennsylvania Academy of Fine Arts but the grand mosaic remains in its home in the lobby of the Curtis Building/Center.
