= Curtis Publishing Company =

American publisher of periodicals

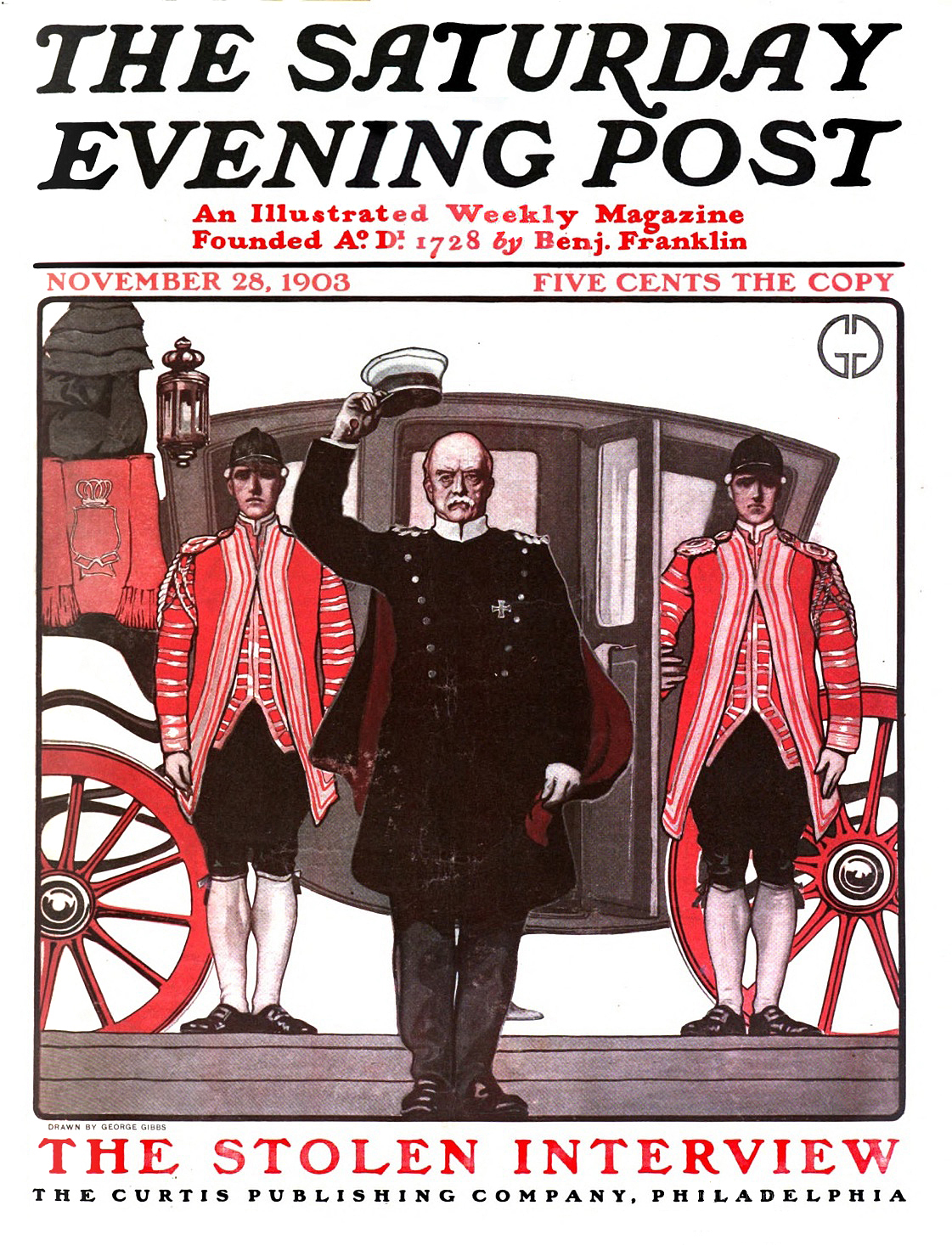
- The November 28, 1903 edition of The Saturday Evening Post, published by Curtis Publishing Company
- Industry: Book Publishing and Marketing
- Founded: 1891; 135 years ago
- Founder: Cyrus H. K. Curtis
- Successor: Curtis Publishing Company
- Headquarters: Philadelphia, Pennsylvania, United States
- Area served: Worldwide
- Products: Books
- Services: Publishing, Marketing
- Website: curtispublishingcompany.com

The Curtis Publishing Company, founded in 1891 in Philadelphia, Pennsylvania, became one of the largest and most influential publishers in the United States during the early 20th century. The company's publications included the Ladies' Home Journal and The Saturday Evening Post, The American Home, Holiday, Jack & Jill, and Country Gentleman.

In the 1940s, Curtis also had a comic book imprint, Novelty Press. The company declined in the later 20th century, and its publications were sold or discontinued. It now exists as a self publisher for independent authors and offers publishing and marketing to authors around the globe.

== History ==
=== 19th century ===
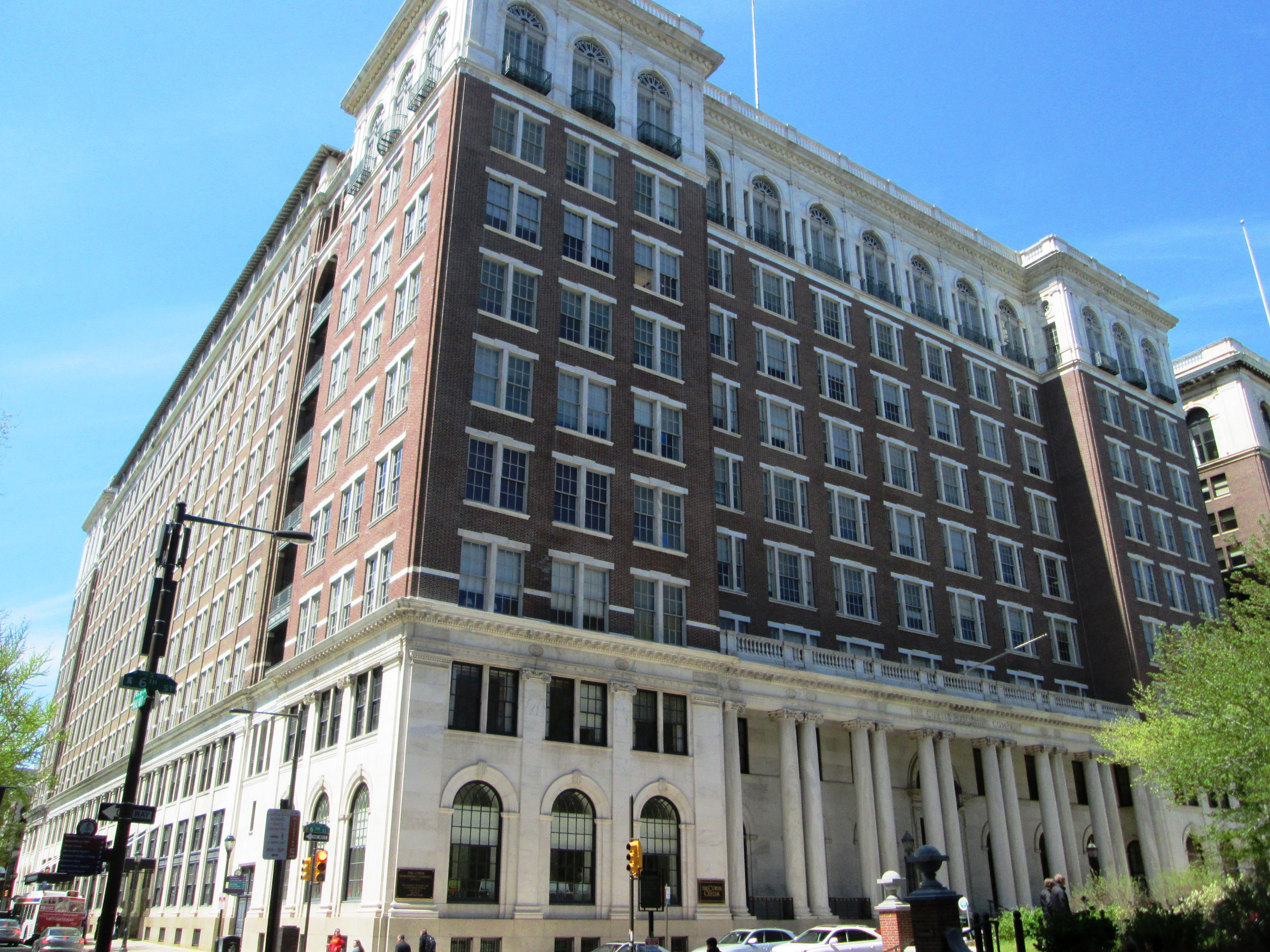
The Curtis Center at the Northwest corner of 6th and Walnut Streets in Center City Philadelphia, built in 1910 and designed by Edgar Seeler in the Beaux Arts style

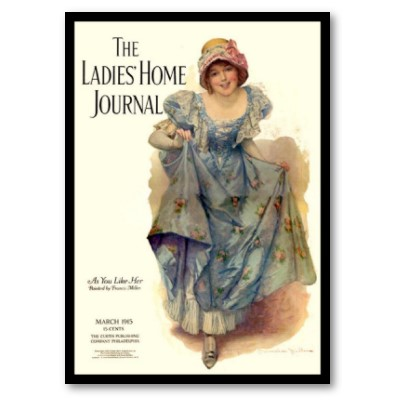
Ladies' Home Journal in 1900

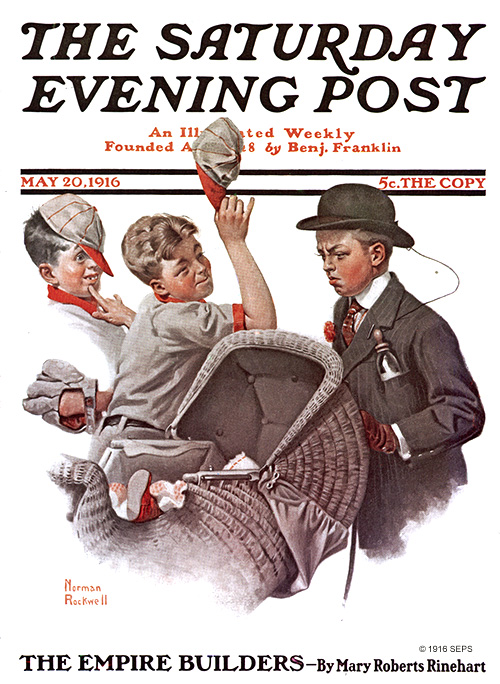
The May 20, 1916, edition of The Saturday Evening Post

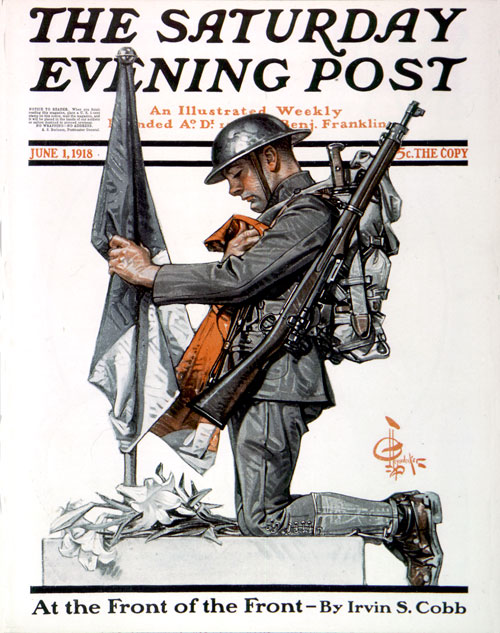
The June 1, 1918, edition of The Saturday Evening Post

The Curtis Publishing Company was founded in 1891 by publisher Cyrus H. K. Curtis, who published the People's Ledger, a news magazine he launched in Boston in 1872, and then moved to Philadelphia, which was a major publishing center in the nation, four years later, in 1876. Curtis established the Tribune and Farmer in 1879. Curtis' wife, Louisa Knapp Curtis, developed a women's section to the magazine and the Ladies' Home Journal, which she edited from 1883 to 1889, all of which became part of Curtis Publishing Company.

In 1897, Curtis bought The Saturday Evening Post for $1000, and developed it into one of the nation's most popular periodicals.

The magazine had its roots in Benjamin Franklin's Pennsylvania Gazette, which went back to 1728. When Curtis took over the Post, it had a subscription base of 2,000. The base was over one million by 1906 and by 1960 was over six million. Editor George Horace Lorimer brought in top writers and illustrators and helped usher in "American's Golden Age of Illustration." Artists such as Norman Rockwell were featured as well as J. C. Leyendecker, John Clymer, Stevan Dohanos, Sarah Stilwell-Weber, and John La Gatta.

=== 20th century ===
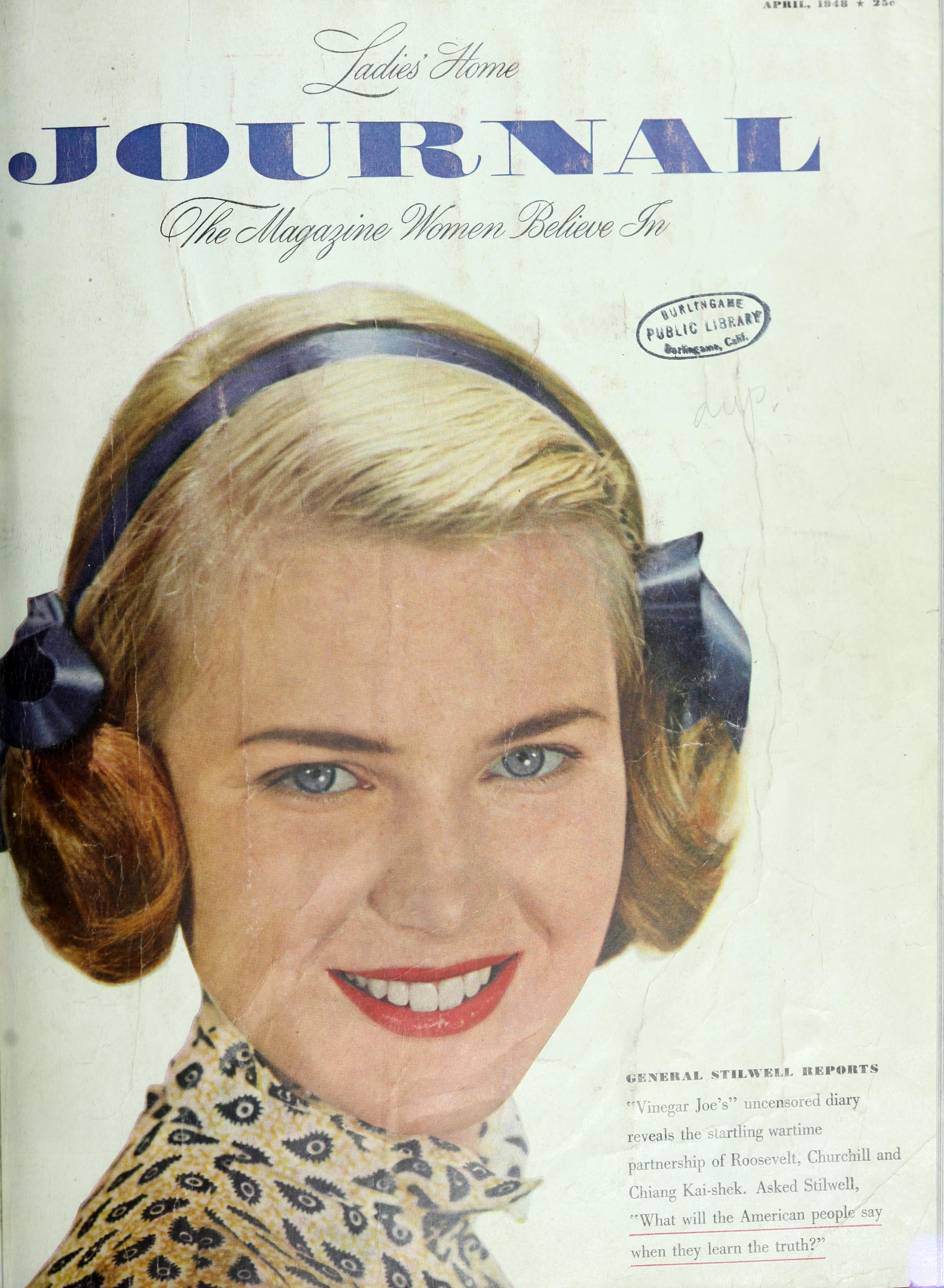
A 1948 edition of Ladies' Home Journal

Curtis Publishing created a market research division in 1911 under Charles Coolidge Parlin. The goal of the division was to understand their customers and was one of the first market research firms.

Curtis reported record earnings of $21 million on $84 million in revenue in 1929.

Curtis spun off their market research division, National Analysts, as an independent organization to provide market research services to business and government.

In 1946, Curtis Publishing launched Holiday magazine, focusing on travel and photo essays.

The emergence of television in the late 1940s and early 1950s competed for people's attention and eroded the popularity of general-interest periodicals such as the Post and the Journal. The New York Times reported that both the finance markets and Madison Avenue were watching Curtis Publishing's efforts to save itself after a financial decline. The reason the New York Times gave for the attention, "the status of the venerable Curtis empire, the colorful cast of characters directing the comeback attempt, the vast sums of money at stake. In addition, Curtis's troubles seemed to reflect the difficulties encountered by the mass magazines industry as a whole in adjusting to an era dominated by the spiraling growth of television." It wasn't until 1961 and 1962 that the struggle became evident in lost revenue.

In 1961, Curtis Publishing president Robert A. MacNeal announced that the company had lost money for the first time in the more than seven decades since its incorporation. The company's financials showed a loss of $4,194,000 on $178.4 million in revenue that year. The following year, in 1962, company had total revenues of $149 million and a loss of $18.9 million. Curtis management went to Serge Semenenko who had helped the Hearst Corporation to reorganize and Semenenko arranged for a six-bank syndicate to loan $10.5 million to Curtis.

Many experts wrote of multiple issues tied to the decline of Curtis. Many of their competitors such as Time, Inc. and McCall Corporation had diversified while Curtis remained focused on their two key periodicals, The Saturday Evening Post and Ladies' Home Journal. Their other magazines, Holiday, Jack & Jill, and American, could not make up the lost revenue of the main periodicals. The Saturday Evening Post had been surpassed by Life magazine as the top mass market periodical in 1942 and then spiraled into a ten-year decline in advertising revenue after World War II.

Ladies' Home Journal lost its position to McCall's in 1960. Other experts said that the two flagship magazines "simply grew old." Curtis "fell into a formula that tended to attract older readers rather than the young married couples that advertisers wanted to reach." They also stayed away from the more aggressive circulation promotions used by their competitors. Matthew J. Culligan, President of Curtis, cited another financial drag from using its own presses and paper. Culligan said, "This sort of self-sufficiency is fine in good times but it imposes an intolerable burden when business goes bad." They had also failed to follow the model of some of their competitors by diversifying into television, news magazines or book publishing after World War II.

Ben Hibbs, the editor of The Saturday Evening Post since 1942, retired, as did Bruce and Beatrice Gould of the Ladies' Home Journal (editors since 1935). The Post attempted to reinvent itself with more controversial articles and flashy graphics. Two editors, Robert Fouss of the Saturday Evening Post, and Curtiss Anderson of Ladies' Home Journal, quickly came and went. Ted Patrick, editor of Holiday magazine, said that aggressive cost-cutting would be the kiss of death to Holiday.

Curtis received another loan of $5.5 million in 1964 to be used to make investments in new editorial properties.

Perfect Film loaned the company $5 million in 1968 at the request of Curtis's primary loan holder, First National Bank of Boston, to extend its loans. Curtis sold its Philadelphia headquarters to real estate developer John W. Merriam for $7.3 million to pay off most of the First National loan; it leased half of the building back for its operations.

In 1968, Curtis Publishing sold the Ladies' Home Journal and The American Home to Downe Communications for $5.4 million in stock; it sold the stock for operating revenue. The list of six million Post subscribers was sold to Life for cash, a $2.5 million loan, and a contract with Curtis' circulation and printing services subsidiaries. Despite these attempts to revive the Saturday Evening Post, and failing to find a purchaser for the magazine, Curtis Publishing shut it down in 1969. In March 1969, the Federal Trade Commission directed Curtis to offer cash refunds for unfulfilled portions of Post subscriptions.

Perfect Film purchased Curtis Circulation Company that same year.

In 1976, The Saturday Evening Post Society was spun off from Curtis to resume publication of its flagship magazine. U.S. Kids was formed, which publishes their portfolio of children's magazines.

=== 21st century ===
In the 21st century, Curtis Publishing Company offers worldwide publishing and marketing to independent authors around the globe.

Curtis Publishing Company
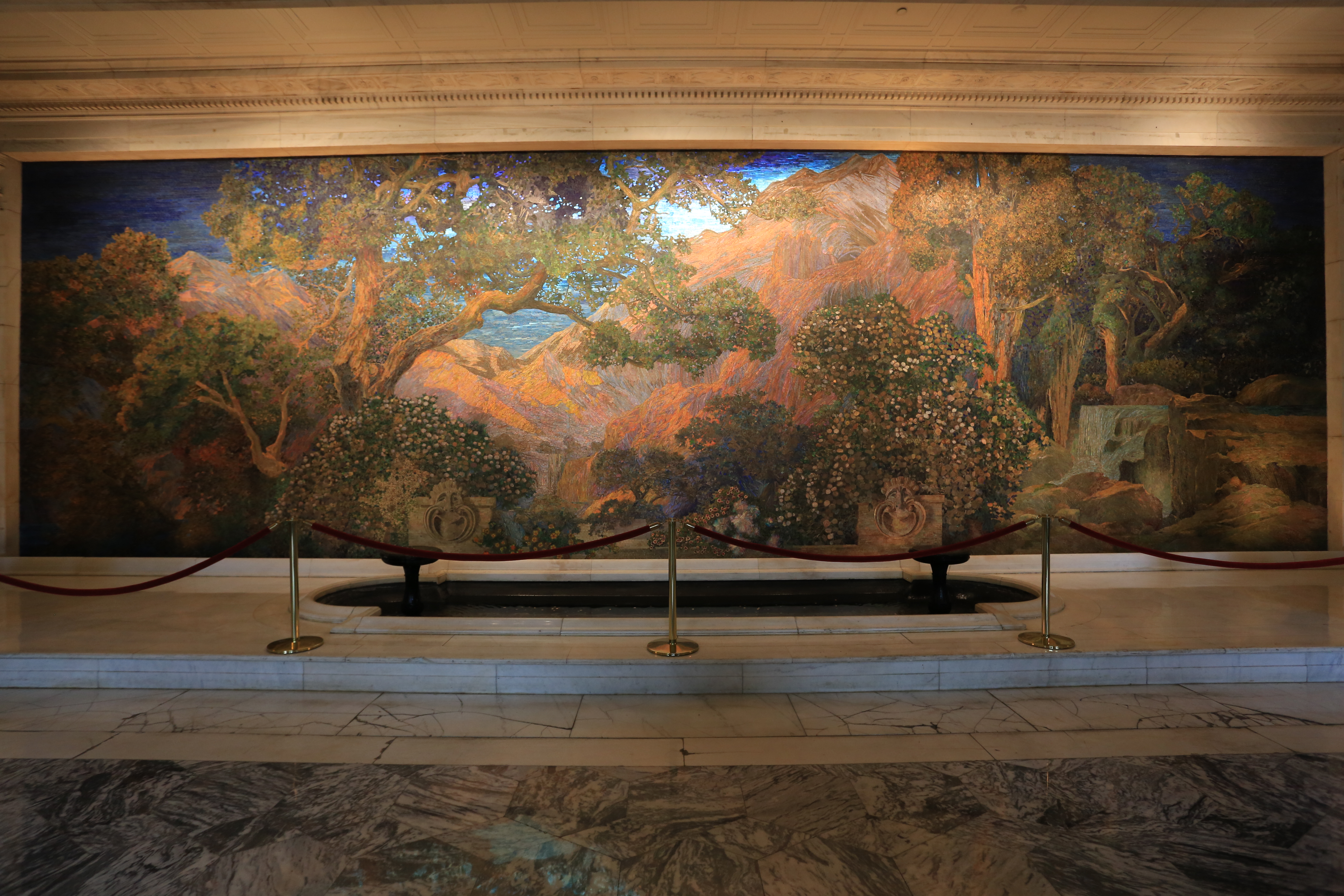
- The Dream Garden, a glass-mosaic mural by Maxfield Parrish and made by Louis Comfort Tiffany
- Interactive map of Curtis Publishing Company
- 39°56′54″N 75°09′06″W
- Location: 170 S. Independence Mall West, Philadelphia, Pennsylvania, U.S.

Philadelphia Register of Historic Places
- Designated: November 30, 1998

== Properties and subsidiaries ==
- The Saturday Evening Post
- Ladies' Home Journal
- The American Home
- Holiday
- Jack & Jill
- The Country Gentleman
- Novelty Press
- National Analysts
- Royal Electrotype Company
- Curtis Books

== Curtis Center and Dream Garden ==
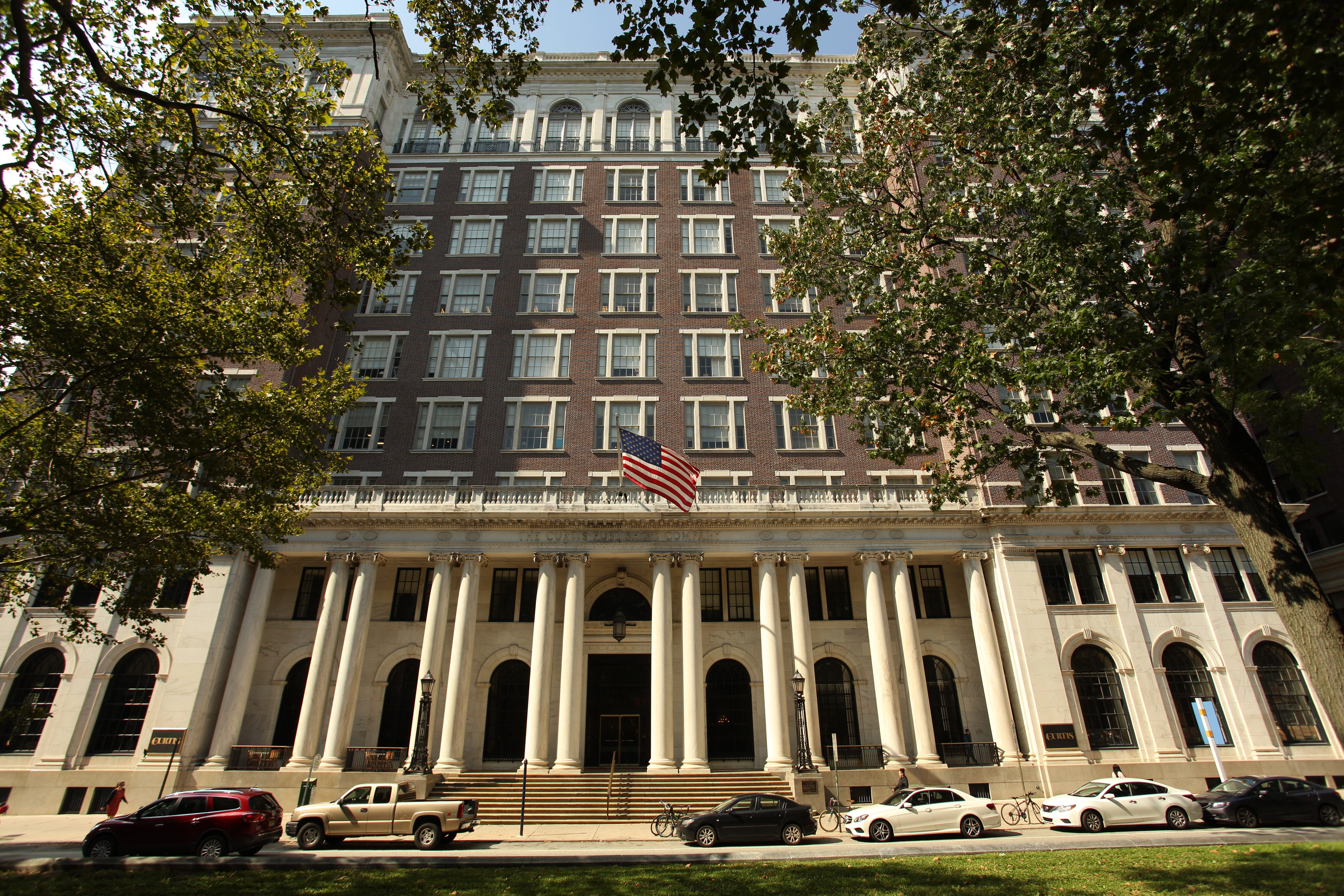
Front facade of Curtis Center on S. 6th St. in Center City Philadelphia

In 1910, the company built its headquarters building at the intersection of South Sixth and Walnut Streets about 200 feet (61 m) southwest of Independence Hall. The offices and press building and the company's warehouse) was designed by Edgar Viguers Seeler (1867–1929) in the Beaux Arts style. The square-block building stretches from South Sixth to South Seventh Street east to west, and from Sansom Street to Walnut Street north to south. The building was renovated in 1990 by Oldham and Seltz and John Milner Associates.

The interior of the building features a terraced waterfall and fountain, an atrium with faux-Egyptian palm trees, and the 15-by-49-foot (4.6 m × 14.9 m) glass-mosaic The Dream Garden, designed by Maxfield Parrish and made by Louis Tiffany and Tiffany Studios in 1916. The glass-mosaic work was commissioned by Edward Bok, who was the Senior Editor of the company at the time. It was exhibited at Tiffany Studios in New York City for a month before being installed in the building's lobby, which took six months. The mosaic is made of 100,000 pieces of hand-fixed Favrile glass in 260 different colors.

In 1998, the mosaic was sold to casino owner Steve Wynn, who intended to move it to one of his casinos in Las Vegas. This was blocked by local historians and art lovers, who raised $3.5 million to purchase the work and prevent its being moved from the city. The money was provided by the Pew Charitable Trusts to the Pennsylvania Academy of the Fine Arts, which now owns the work.

== See also ==
- Curtis Hall Arboretum, Curtis family estate in Wyncote, Pennsylvania
