= Steppin' in a Slide Zone =

Single by the Moody Blues

from the album Octave
- B-side: "Had to Fall in Love" (Netherlands); "I'll Be Level with You" (US)
- Released: 27 May 1978
- Recorded: January–April 1978
- Genre: Rock, synthpop
- Length: 5:28 (Album version); 3:30 (Single version)
- Label: Decca
- Songwriter(s): John Lodge
- Producer(s): Tony Clarke

The Moody Blues singles chronology
"I'm Just a Singer (In a Rock and Roll Band)" (1973)	"Steppin' in a Slide Zone" (1978)	"Driftwood" (1978)

"Steppin' in a Slide Zone" is a 1978 single by the English progressive rock band the Moody Blues. It was the first single the Moody Blues had released in five years, after the band's temporary hiatus. It was written by bassist John Lodge, and was released a month later on the album Octave. The song peaked at number 39 on the US Billboard Hot 100 and number 41 in Canada.

Billboard described "Steppin' in a Slide Zone" as a "fast paced rocker". Cash Box praised the "fuzz keyboard work, punctuating horns...towering chorus, excellent production values and...unusual lyric." Record World said that the song "shows off a heavy rock beat with [The Moody Blues'] customary lush arrangements and full production effects." Classic Rock critic Malcolm Dome rated it as the Moody Blues' 8th greatest song.

One of the most noticeable differences in the band's sound after this hiatus was that the Mellotron and Chamberlin (a similar instrument to the Mellotron) had been replaced with more widely used synthesizers, and "Steppin' in a Slide Zone" was the first of their singles to use synthesizers. The synthesizer would ultimately give the Moody Blues a more electronic sound, which departed from the more symphonic sound of their past career.

The lyrics were somewhat autobiographical, dealing with the band's uncertainty resulting from their hiatus.

== Personnel ==
- Justin Hayward – electric guitar, backing vocals
- John Lodge – bass guitar, lead vocals
- Mike Pinder – keyboards, backing vocals
- Ray Thomas – flute, backing vocals
- Graeme Edge – drums, percussion
