= Gemini Dream =

1981 single by the Moody Blues

Single by the Moody Blues

from the album Long Distance Voyager
- B-side: "Painted Smile"
- Released: 19 May 1981
- Recorded: Spring 1980
- Genre: New wave; rock
- Length: 4:09 (album version); 3:46 (single version)
- Label: Threshold
- Songwriters: Justin Hayward; John Lodge
- Producer: Pip Williams

The Moody Blues singles chronology
"Driftwood" (1978)	"Gemini Dream" (1981)	"The Voice" (1981)

Music video
- "Gemini Dream" on YouTube

"Gemini Dream" is a song written by Justin Hayward and John Lodge that was released by the Moody Blues on their 1981 album Long Distance Voyager and also as the lead single from the album. It reached number 12 on the US Hot 100, as well as number 1 on the Canada RPM Top 100 Singles chart. It ranked as the 28th biggest Canadian hit of 1981.

== Background ==
"Gemini Dream" was the first of three singles released from Long Distance Voyager, with "Painted Smile", another track from the album, on the B-side. Two more songs from Long Distance Voyager, "The Voice" and "Talking Out of Turn", were subsequently released as singles after the album's release."

"Gemini Dream" was written jointly by the band's lead guitarist Hayward and bassist Lodge, both of whom won an ASCAP songwriting award for it. While Hayward and Lodge had collaborated on a duet album outside of the Moody Blues in 1975 called Blue Jays, "Gemini Dream" was the first song performed by the Moody Blues that they had written together.

The song developed out of a jam session. Hayward said:

We started grooving on that particular beat – I suppose it's about 115 or 120 [beats per minute], something like that, perhaps a bit faster – and then what came out was a sort of guitar riff, and [drummer] Graeme [Edge] was a real four-on-the-floor beat – boom-CHA-boom-CHA – that kind of thing, and John [Lodge] was doing an eight to the bar. And we had headphones on and were shouting silly things, sort of like a joke. The song itself developed out of us sort of saying "Oh, that's quite good," and remembering this groove.

Hayward also said:

I came up with the guitar riff out of that [jam session]. Then John and I wrote some lyrics to it. I didn't think it was anything important at the time, but politically, in the group and everything, it was kind of the right thing to do.

As they developed the lyrics they tried to make it a song about touring that would be meaningful to fans but also a love song. Lodge had wanted to give the song the title along the lines of "Touring the USA" and Hayward wanted to call it "Backstage Pass", but they didn't think either was right, and eventually settled on "Gemini Dream", since "Gemini" represented the two personalities.

== Lyrics and music ==
Most of the lyrics of "Gemini Dream" are about a rock band while touring, but also lyrics are also about shared love. The Star Press critic Kim Teverbaugh said that "It is about the band getting back together and taking to the road. Lodge remembers:

I wanted to write the song saying, let's get back on the road. Be who we want, because I'm a musician. I like to play. I like to perform. We had a band which could really perform, and I really wanted to get back on the road. So it's 'long time, no see. Short time for you and me.' I had that in my brain. And actually the first incarnation of it, roughly, it was called "Touring America", not "Gemini Dream". But that was like the engine that started us on that road, Long Distance Voyager.

Detroit Free Press critic Bruce Britt described the music as having "a hybrid folk-disco sound." Ottawa Citizen critic Bill Provick compared its sound to ELO.

Hayward and Lodge sing lead vocals in harmony. Long Distance Voyager was the Moody Blues' first album since Patrick Moraz replaced Mike Pinder as the keyboardist, and so "Gemini Dream" was the first single released with Moraz.

== Reception ==
Record World called the song a "majestic rocker with just a touch of disco." Billboard said the band was "in super form" and called the song a "dance-beat propelled track that is highlighted by crisp, clear vocals and the group's patented orchestral sound."

Upon the album's release, Teverbaugh felt "It most likely is the best song this year will produce" and noted that the song sounded a little like ELO. Post-Gazette critic Gary Graff described it as sounding like "Lipps, Inc. meets the Electric Light Orchestra." Sacramento Bee critic Bob Sylva said it "possesses a clever, very Hall & Oates-like vocal harmonies between Justin Hayward and John Lodge that's a delight." News-Democrat critic Roger Schlueter joked that "Rock fans will probably see 'Gemini Dream' as [Long Distance Voyager's] saving grace much as they saw 'Peak Hour' as one of the best cuts Days of Future Past had to offer," noting that "the beat and vocals are straight-forward."

Ultimate Classic Rock critic Nick DeRiso rated it as the Moody Blues' 10th greatest song, calling it "a canny update of their core sound" and saying that it "set a template for the glossy-sheened prog-pop of Asia and the '80s-era retooled Yes." Allmusic critic Dave Connolly felt that it "does sound dated in today's post-Xanadu landscape." Music journalist Geoffrey Freakes described the song as "synth-pop", combining ELO-like melodies and harmonies with the Human League-like rhythm and synth hook, which he says is "a strange concoction that hasn't dated particularly well."

== John Lodge version ==
Lodge released a live solo version of the song in 2021, recorded in Las Vegas, as a single and on his album The Royal Affair and After. Lodge said of the release after COVID-19 lockdowns:

'Long time no see'...those opening words to Gemini Dream resonate even more with me today – what was true in 1981 has become true again in 2021. The song is about balancing 'twin' lives – touring musicians, and non-touring musicians. I finished my tour on March 8, 2020, and was in lockdown within days, but I never expected to be off the road for this long...Although this was a forced 'sojourn', it was a creative time, writing and recording new songs and a time well-spent with family, but as the song says, "the time is right" to get back on the road. Let's keep that Gemini Dream alive for all of us.....and thank you for keeping the faith.

== Chart performance ==
=== Weekly charts ===
Chart (1981)	Peak position
Australia (KMR)	36
Canada (RPM) Top Singles	1
US Billboard Hot 100	12
US Mainstream Rock	13
US Dance	36
US Cash Box Top 100	13

=== Year-end charts ===
Chart (1981)	Rank
Canada	28
US Cash Box Top 100	89
US (Joel Whitburn's Pop Annual)	86

== Personnel ==
- Justin Hayward – electric guitars, lead vocals
- John Lodge – bass guitar, lead vocals
- Ray Thomas – backing vocals
- Patrick Moraz – Yamaha CS80, Minimoog, Oberheim custom dual-manual 8-voice synthesizer
- Graeme Edge – drums, percussion
