= The Present (Moody Blues album) =

Studio album by the Moody Blues
- Released: 2 September 1983
- Recorded: 8 March – 10 December 1982
- Studios: Strawberry South, Dorking, Surrey
- Genres: Pop rock, synthpop, new wave
- Length: 41:47
- Label: Threshold
- Producer: Pip Williams

The Moody Blues chronology
Long Distance Voyager (1981)	The Present (1983)	Voices in the Sky: The Best of The Moody Blues (1984)

Singles from The Present
- 1. "Blue World" Released: August 1983; 2. "Sitting at the Wheel" Released: November 1983; 3. "Running Water" Released: December 1983 (US only)

Professional ratings
Review scores
Source	Rating
AllMusic	2.5/5 stars
Rolling Stone	3/5 stars

The Present is the eleventh album by the Moody Blues, released in 1983. This was the group's last original studio album to be released on their custom label, Threshold Records.

== Overview ==
The album is the second of the Patrick Moraz era. It provided three minor hit singles in the U.S. with "Blue World" (number 62), "Sitting at the Wheel" (number 27) and "Running Water".

The album has a track sequence designed to capitalise on the legacy of the more successful Long Distance Voyager, with Justin Hayward's songs at the beginning and Ray Thomas's at the end. In November 2008 the album was remastered and released on CD with two extra tracks.

The cover is a pastiche of Maxfield Parrish's painting Daybreak.

== Original track listing ==
=== Side One ===
1. "Blue World" (Justin Hayward) – 5:20 (lead singer: Justin Hayward)
2. "Meet Me Halfway" (Hayward, John Lodge) – 4:08 (lead singers: Justin Hayward, John Lodge)
3. "Sitting at the Wheel" (Lodge) – 5:40 (lead singer: John Lodge)
4. "Going Nowhere" (Graeme Edge) – 5:33 (lead singer: Ray Thomas)

=== Side Two ===
1. "Hole in the World" (Lodge) – 1:54 (instrumental)
2. "Under My Feet" (Lodge) – 4:51 (lead singer: John Lodge)
3. "It's Cold Outside of Your Heart" (Hayward) – 4:27 (lead singer: Justin Hayward)
4. "Running Water" (Hayward) – 3:23 (lead singer: Justin Hayward)
5. "I Am" (Ray Thomas) – 1:40 (lead singer: Ray Thomas)
6. "Sorry" (Thomas) – 5:02 (lead singer: Ray Thomas)

=== 2008 remastered CD expanded edition ===
The 2008 release contains two extra tracks:

11. "Blue World" (Single Edit)" – 3:38
12. "Sitting at the Wheel (Steve Greenberg Remix)" – 7:32

== Personnel ==
=== The Moody Blues ===
- Justin Hayward – vocals, guitar
- John Lodge – vocals, bass guitar
- Ray Thomas – vocals, harmonica, flute
- Graeme Edge – drums
- Patrick Moraz – keyboards

=== Additional personnel ===
- Pip Williams – producer
- Greg Jackman – engineer

== Charts ==
Chart (1983)	Peak position
Canada Top Albums/CDs (RPM)	11
Dutch Albums (Album Top 100)	26
German Albums (Offizielle Top 100)	33
New Zealand Albums (RMNZ)	26
Norwegian Albums (VG-lista)	14
Swedish Albums (Sverigetopplistan)	35
UK Albums (Official Charts)	15
US Billboard 200	26

== Certifications ==
Region	Certification	Certified units/sales
Canada (Music Canada)	Gold	50,000^{^}
^{^} Shipments figures based on certification alone.
