= Charles Coolidge Parlin =

- Born: February 18, 1872
- Died: October 15, 1942 (aged c. 70)
- Occupations: Commercial research manager Market analyst
- Years active: 1911-1938
- Known for: Creating the field of market research
- Notable work: Department Store Lines; Automobiles; The Aviation Industry

Charles Coolidge Parlin (February 18, 1872 – October 15, 1942) was the American "manager of the division of commercial research of the Curtis Publishing Company" in charge of selling advertising spots in the Saturday Evening Post. He is credited as being the founder and a "pioneer" in the area of market research.

== Career ==
Parlin worked as a member of the United States Food Administration while it was run by Herbert Hoover during World War I before becoming a schoolteacher in De Pere, Wisconsin. He would then move on to be the Principal of the Wausau Senior High School and concurrently as President of the Wisconsin State Teachers' Association. In 1911, he was hired by the Curtis Publishing Company in a job that had no clearly defined title, as the work he was doing had not previously been done. Parlin came up with the name "commercial research" for his work, which would later end up being changed to market research. The company had just bought out the magazine, Country Gentleman, but the owner of the company, Cyrus Hermann Kotzschmar Curtis, had little knowledge about agriculture. Since much of the advertising in the Country Gentleman magazine was purchased by the agriculturalists, Parlin began researching agriculture in general. After six months of interviews with a number of people in the industry, he completed a 460-page survey that "revealed unsuspected facts about where agricultural tools were made, to whom they were sold, when, and where."

After this, Parlin carried out a study on "the market for almost everything in the nation's one hundred largest cities," which involved 1,121 interviews across the nation, compiling all of the findings in order to draw conclusions about the workings of the national market. His "pioneer report", Department Store Lines, was released in 1912 and it focused on the distinctions between convenience goods and shopping goods and how the marketer should focus on selling primarily shopping goods in order to obtain the highest profits.

In 1914, Parlin released a five-volume study titled Automobiles. It focused on the future of the automobile age and "collected facts on manufacturing and distribution, on the influence of women on automobile purchase". The study predicted correctly that the number of grades and makes would be reduced in the future and it "envisaged the dimensions and even the shape of the automobile market." This information resulted in an increase in advertising by automobile manufacturers, in order to obtain customers faster than their competitors in the burgeoning market for automobiles.

Largely due to Parlin's success, other commercial organisations began creating Departments of Commercial Research including: United States Rubber Company in 1915 and Swift and Company in 1916. Foreseeing a need for "standardized definitions and common measures" after the release of Parlin's studies, the Audit Bureau of Circulations was formed in 1914 in order to regulate publisher's claims for newspaper and magazine circulations.

During the 1920s, Parlin went on to found the "first commercial research company" with Donald M. Hobart, backed by the Curtis Publishing Company, called National Analysts. He began a new series of investigations in 1929 into the aviation industry and the importance of airplanes in the transportation of commercial products. The aviation report was released in April 1930 and titled The Aviation Industry. In it, he concluded that private airplane ownership would massively increase by 1940, a significant amount of long-distance mail will begin being sent via planes, and that the number of plane making companies and types of planes would be massively reduced due to expansion and competition. Parlin retired from the company in 1938 and was succeeded by Hobart.

== Legacy ==
The Charles Coolidge Parlin Marketing Research Award was established in 1945 by "the Philadelphia Chapter of the AMA and The Wharton School in association with the Curtis Publishing Company to honor persons, who have made outstanding contributions to the field of marketing research." It is meant to act as a memorial to Parlin, due to his creation of the field of market research.

== See also ==
- Marketing research
