= Veteran Cosmic Rocker =

1981 song by the Moody Blues

Single by The Moody Blues

from the album Long Distance Voyager
- A-side: "Talking Out of Turn"
- Released: November 1981
- Recorded: September 1980
- Length: 3:05
- Label: Threshold
- Songwriter(s): Ray Thomas
- Producer(s): Pip Williams

"Veteran Cosmic Rocker" is a 1981 song by the progressive rock band the Moody Blues. It was written by the band's flautist Ray Thomas. "Veteran Cosmic Rocker" first appeared as the final track of the Moody Blues' 1981 album Long Distance Voyager, and was later released in November 1981 on the B-Side of "Talking Out of Turn."

"Veteran Cosmic Rocker" is the third and final song in a suite that concludes Long Distance Voyager. The first song in this suite is "Painted Smile," which is then followed by "Reflective Smile," a short poem connecting the themes of the two songs. Moody Blues bassist John Lodge said:

I know Ray had written a poem and he had written the "Painted Smile" song and he got this idea of this veteran cosmic rocker. I think we all sat down and said, "This will be really great if we ended up with this sort of Bo Diddley beat at the end." Then you've got this whole trilogy together, with this lonely guy on stage. At the end of the day, that's what we are.

The title comes from a phrase that a New York journalist used to describe Thomas. Producer Pip Williams said:

"VCR" was Ray's nickname for himself – a deliberate '60s-type title that suggested Kaftans, joss-sticks, hippie paraphernalia, and Eastern promise. It was the last song recorded for LDV, after the summer break, and began life on Monday, September 15, 1980, at 7 p.m. The main body of the song suggested the mystical, "hippy" approach, deliberately alluding to the '60s influences, and the use of a backward sitar drone seemed appropriate to me.

Ray Thomas performs a harmonica solo and a flute solo about halfway through the song, over a shuffle rhythm. There is also a section of Middle Eastern flavored music. At the beginning of the song, Ray Thomas can be faintly heard saying the line "I'll have a Scotch and Coke please, Mother!" At the end of the song is a backward message in which Thomas can be faintly heard saying "What happens anyway, you know?" According to Williams, this occurred because Williams had commented that he wasn't sure about the headphone balance Thomas was replying "Never mind, just roll the tape and we'll see what happens anyway" and the last part got picked up when they started taping. The band thought that playing that backwards sounded neat and so they decided to leave it in.

The Star Press critic Kim Teverbaugh described the melody as "haunting." Johnson City Press critic Elaine Cloud Goller said it "features an Arabian sound that evokes visions of swirling, scarved dancers, all the while discussing the inner fears of the idolized performer, who is without assurance in himself or the future." Hartford Courant critic Henry McNulty described it as a sequel to the Moody Blues' 1972 hit "I'm Just a Singer in a Rock and Roll Band" and called it a "worthwhile statement", albeit preceded by "one of those pretentious, imbecilic spoken song-poems [i.e., 'Reflective Smile'] that infect Moodies records. Roanoke Times writer Ben Cromer described the song as "[taking] a stab at rock 'n' rollers who take themselves too seriously." News-Democrat critic Roger Schlueter called it "a rehash of 'I'm Just a Singer in a Rock and Roll Band,' but matching neither the latter's beauty or grace," and said it was "a silly 10-years-too-late Tommy-esque concoction."

Post-Gazette critic Gary Graff said that the suite of "Painted Smile"/"Reflective Smile"/"Veteran Cosmic Rocker" show that the band "are still masters of the offbeat comparison, splicing a carnivalesque of the sad clown's lament with the superficiality of rock 'n' roll lifestyles." Canadian Press critic Michael Lawson found the suite to be "interesting if a touch over-dramatic." Cromer praised Patrick Moraz' keyboards and Pip Williams' production on the suite.

The song was generally included in the band's live sets during the 1980s, generally at the end of the first half of the show.

== Personnel ==
- Ray Thomas – lead vocals, flute, harmonica
- Justin Hayward – sitar, electric guitars
- John Lodge – bass
- Patrick Moraz – Minimoog, Mellotron, Oberheim custom dual-manual 8-voice synthesizer, piano, Roland Jupiter-4
- Graeme Edge – Simmons electronic drums, Simmons Clap Trap drum machine, maracas, bell tree, drums
- Pip Williams – electric guitar, electric sitar
