= Octave (album) =

Studio album by the Moody Blues
- Released: 9 June 1978
- Recorded: October 1977 – April 1978
- Studios: The Record Plant, Los Angeles; Indigo Ranch, Malibu, California
- Genres: Rock, pop, progressive rock
- Length: 46:08
- Labels: Decca (UK); London (US)
- Producer: Tony Clarke

The Moody Blues chronology
| Caught Live + 5 (1977) | Octave (1978) | Long Distance Voyager (1981) |

Singles from Octave
- 1. "Steppin' in a Slide Zone" Released: May 1978; 2. "Driftwood" Released: October 1978

Colored vinyl issue
- Limited release edition

Professional ratings
Review scores
| Source | Rating |
|---|---|
| AllMusic | 3/5 stars |
| Rolling Stone | (unfavorable) |

Octave is the ninth album by the Moody Blues (the eighth by this particular line-up), released in 1978, and their first release after a substantial hiatus following the success of the best-selling Seventh Sojourn in 1972. It saw the Moody Blues returning in an era of punk music and disco, and produced a reduced commercial outcome for the band, but reached No. 6 in the United Kingdom and went platinum in the United States, where the album reached No. 13. The album produced the hit single "Steppin' in a Slide Zone", which hit No. 39 in the US, in addition to "Driftwood". The album's title is a musical pun: it references both the notion of an octave; and as a word derived from the Latin octavus it refers to this being the eighth album by this line-up of the Moody Blues (following on from the previous album title Seventh Sojourn).

== Background ==
Octave was considered a departure from previous Moody Blues albums, mainly because of the group's use of lounge-style organs and synthesizers in place of a Mellotron or Chamberlin (Mike Pinder's song "One Step Into the Light" references the Mellotron). Real strings were used on three songs: "Under Moonshine" and "I'm Your Man" (both written by Ray Thomas), as well as "Survival" (written by John Lodge). The album was something of a comeback for the group, who had not released an album as a full group in six years. Justin Hayward remembers, "We were apart for three years, and we knew we were going to record another album together, but, in interviews, none of us were going to say it until we actually did it. We never thought we would be able to come back in the same way. We thought we had been away too long, so we were really making a record for ourselves. But then it just took off again--it's like what people couldn't have, they wanted even more."

The album proved to be the last for the group with keyboardist Mike Pinder, who left during the album's sessions and declined an offer to tour with the group. He had just started a new family in California, and found that he was not getting along with his bandmates as he previously had. Hayward remembers, "He left the band halfway through the album, and then when we wanted to go out on tour, he decided he didn't want to tour anymore, either. And, apart from a few letters of business, we haven't had much contact. I just think his priorities became different, whereas mine--and everyone else's--were always music, No. 1. And I still really miss him, because, when I first came into the band, it was our singing and writing that really got us going; we kind of started together." Hayward reflects further on Pinder's creative role in the band, and how his and Clarke's departure resulted in a stylistic change for the group: "A number of things changed. Two of the mystics left - Mike Pinder and Tony Clarke. They were the strange ones - the rest of us were quite normal! Mike leaving meant a change in emphasis of lyric, because I always had to play things to Mike, and I always wanted Mike's approval. He was a hero of mine, there's no getting away from it, and he was the most important figure in the band for a long while. And he knew that I was the one that was going to make it happen, but he was the one who was behind me making it happen."

Pinder would be replaced by former Yes keyboardist Patrick Moraz in time for their 1978-1979 tour, beginning a new era in the band's history.

== Writing ==
The lead single and opening track, "Steppin' in a Slide Zone" was influenced by a mudslide that occurred during the recording sessions. Lodge recalls, "Mike built a studio up in Malibu called Indigo Ranch, we went up there, and we were hit by the mudslides, and we were marooned up there on the top of The Hills of Malibu. We couldn't get down because the roads washed away, and I said, 'Ah, yep. Looks like we're steppin' in a slide zone down here'."

Justin Hayward shares his fondness for Mike Pinder's "One Step into the Light" in a 2019 interview: "One Step Into the Light" was the song that Mike had written several years before and that we recorded in his little home studio. I cannot listen to that song, because it just wells up in me. It's just one of the most beautiful songs, ever. He gave me some great gifts, and one of them was to be able to play that song. And then he left. Things were, just personally, not right for him inside that band. So that's when we became four instead of five. Somewhere in there are those two old guitars — because he was a guitar player, too — that we played together on the original version. And I think his vocal is the original version, too. I remember the oxide was falling off that tape, it had been played so many times."

Hayward shares the inspiration for the closing track, "The Day We Meet Again": "That particular song was about people in my family — I come from a family with a very strong faith, and so that's in my background as well. And I come from a part of England that is full of history — the west country. It's a very evocative part of England. It's about people that I loved, and the loss of them. I'm talking about men and women. I find in life that it doesn't matter. If you meet someone, and something inside you says, 'Stay close to this person. Stay close to them,' I always make a point of doing that. Those are the people that I write about. And they're in that song. in the Record Plant in Los Angeles where we recorded it...there was this funny old little Farfisa organ. Late one night, I asked the engineer to put it up. I just started playing that [sings organ groove], and then I thought, 'Hang on, I can just do this three chord thing all the way through the song, in this particular kind of syncopated thing'. That's the bit I like about it most."

== Recording ==
The album proved to be a struggle to produce, being their first to be recorded in the United States, at the Record Plant in Los Angeles and Indigo Ranch in Malibu. Octave would also be the final studio album from the band produced by Tony Clarke. The sessions were marked by marital troubles among the group's members, fires, floods, mudslides and a broken arm. Justin Hayward remembers, "I was mental at the end. There was a great lethargy around that album. Tony Clarke, our record producer, had personal disaster during that album and didn't finish it. And Mike couldn't make up his mind whether he wanted to stay or not. I missed him terribly. I played a lot of the keyboards on it. It was in the time when nobody was showing any interest in anybody else's songs. It's weird to be in a group like that.

John Lodge elaborates on the difficulties, "When we recorded what became the Octave album, I was never too sure it was the right time to make the album. Also we were recording in America and it was the first album we were going to record outside of the UK. While we were recording so many things went wrong, not with the band as people, but we were starting recording at the Record Plant. And the Record Plant burned out while we were recording. That was one. I broke my arm. Another one. I recorded after the album with a broken arm and it set with my bass there and said, set it like this so it could still play. And I did that. It was awkward getting in and out of cars, I tell you! Arm up the air. Then private lives in the band between guys and wives, that started to fall apart. We lost our producer during the making of the album, he disappeared. So it really left it to Justin and myself, to continue making the album and producing it. Then we went up to Indigo Ranch in Malibu. And while we were up there, there were the worst floods ever. The mountain slid down the hill and we were stuck up in the mountain in the studio. For days we couldn't get out. And Steppin' In the Slide Zone seemed to conjure up everything to me that was wrong. Or fighting the tide, probably. Yeah, fighting the tide. But it's a great album. It ended up being a really nice album. It was really hard work. But it was a great learning experience for us.

Graeme Edge reflects on the improved dynamic within the band during the sessions despite the loss of Pinder and Clarke and the group's struggles during recording: "Making your solos shows you how much work actually goes into making an album that other people were covering and you weren't perhaps paying enough attention to. So when we got back together, we had a lot more respect for each other."

== Release ==
The cover art was designed by artist John Kosh, famous for his work with The Beatles, The Rolling Stones, and The Who, among others.

The original album was released on clear blue vinyl in Canada.

In November 2008, the album was remastered and released on CD, with five previously unreleased, live, bonus tracks.

== Original track listing ==
=== Side One ===
1. "Steppin' in a Slide Zone" (John Lodge) – 5:29 (lead singer: John Lodge)
2. "Under Moonshine" (Ray Thomas) – 5:00 (lead singer: Ray Thomas)
3. "Had to Fall in Love" (Justin Hayward) – 3:42 (lead singer: Justin Hayward)
4. "I'll Be Level with You" (Graeme Edge) – 3:48 (lead singers: Justin Hayward, Mike Pinder, Ray Thomas, John Lodge)
5. "Driftwood" (Hayward) – 5:03 (lead singer: Justin Hayward)

=== Side Two ===
1. "Top Rank Suite" (Hayward) – 3:42 (lead singer: Justin Hayward)
2. "I'm Your Man" (Thomas) – 4:21 (lead singer: Ray Thomas)
3. "Survival" (Lodge) – 4:09 (lead singer: John Lodge)
4. "One Step into the Light" (Mike Pinder) – 4:29 (lead singer: Mike Pinder)
5. "The Day We Meet Again" (Hayward) – 6:19 (lead singer: Justin Hayward)

=== 2008 CD Expanded Edition tracks (UK) ===
11. "Steppin' in a Slide Zone (Live in Seattle 25 May 1979)" (Lodge) – 4:57
12. "I'm Your Man (Live in Seattle 25 May 1979)" (Thomas) – 4:51
13. "Top Rank Suite (Live in Seattle 25 May 1979)" (Hayward) – 4:28
14. "Driftwood (Live in Seattle 25 May 1979)" (Hayward) – 5:02
15. "The Day We Meet Again (Live in Houston 7 December 1978)" (Hayward) – 7:16

== Personnel ==
- Justin Hayward – vocals, guitars, keyboards
- John Lodge – vocals, bass, keyboards
- Mike Pinder – vocals, organ, synthesizer, Mellotron, piano, electric piano, acoustic guitar
- Ray Thomas – vocals, flute, harmonica, tambourine
- Graeme Edge – vocals, drums, percussion

== Additional personnel ==
- Tony Clarke – producer
- Garry Ladinsky, Chris Brunt, Richard Kaplan, Pete Carlsen, Dennis Hansen – recording engineers
- R. A. Martin – horns, saxophones and arrangement on "Top Rank Suite" and "Driftwood"
- Dr. Terry James – strings arrangement and conductor on "Under Moonshine" and "I'm Your Man"
- Jimmy Haskell – strings arrangement and conductor on "Survival"
- Richard Roth – cover coordination
- David Alexander – photography
- Kosh – design and art direction
- Patrick Moraz – keyboards on live bonus tracks
- Ted Jensen – mastering

== Charts ==
| Chart (1978) | Peak position |
|---|---|
| Austrian Albums (Ö3 Austria) | 25 |
| Canada Top Albums/CDs (RPM) | 9 |
| Dutch Albums (Album Top 100) | 7 |
| Finnish Albums (The Official Finnish Charts) | 13 |
| German Albums (Offizielle Top 100) | 15 |
| New Zealand Albums (RMNZ) | 14 |
| Norwegian Albums (VG-lista) | 9 |
| Swedish Albums (Sverigetopplistan) | 12 |
| UK Albums (Official Charts) | 6 |
| US Billboard 200 | 13 |

== Certifications ==
| Region | Certification | Certified units/sales |
|---|---|---|
| Canada (Music Canada) | Platinum | 100,000^{^} |
| United Kingdom (BPI) | Gold | 100,000^{^} |
| United States (RIAA) | Platinum | 1,000,000^{^} |
^{^} Shipments figures based on certification alone.
