= Maxfield Parrish =

American painter and illustrator (1870–1966)

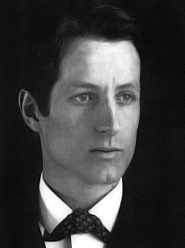
- Maxfield Parrish in 1896
- Born: Frederick Parrish; July 25, 1870; Philadelphia, Pennsylvania, U.S.
- Died: March 30, 1966 (aged 95); Plainfield, New Hampshire, U.S.
- Education: Haverford College, Pennsylvania Academy of the Fine Arts, Drexel Institute of Art, Science & Industry
- Known for: Painter, illustrator
- Spouse: Lydia Ambler Austin (m. 1895; died 1953)

Maxfield Parrish (July 25, 1870 – March 30, 1966) was an American painter and illustrator active in the first half of the 20th century. His works featured distinctive saturated hues and idealized neo-classical imagery. The National Museum of American Illustration deemed his painting Daybreak (1922) to be the most successful art print of the 20th century.

== Early life and education ==
Maxfield Parrish was born in Philadelphia to painter and etcher Stephen Parrish and Elizabeth Bancroft. His given name was Frederick Parrish, but he later adopted Maxfield, his paternal grandmother's maiden name, as his middle, then finally as his professional name. He was raised in a Quaker society. As a child he began drawing for his own amusement, showed talent, and his parents encouraged him. Between 1884 and 1886, his parents took Parrish to Europe, where he toured England, Italy, and France, was exposed to architecture and the paintings by the old masters, and studied at the Paris school of Dr. Kornemann.

He attended the Haverford School and later studied architecture at Haverford College for two years beginning in 1888. To further his education in art, from 1892 to 1895 he studied at the Pennsylvania Academy of the Fine Arts under artists Robert Vonnoh and Thomas Pollock Anshutz. After graduating from the program, Parrish went to Annisquam, Massachusetts, where he and his father shared a painting studio. A year later, with his father's encouragement, he attended the Drexel Institute of Art, Science & Industry where he studied with Howard Pyle.

== Career ==
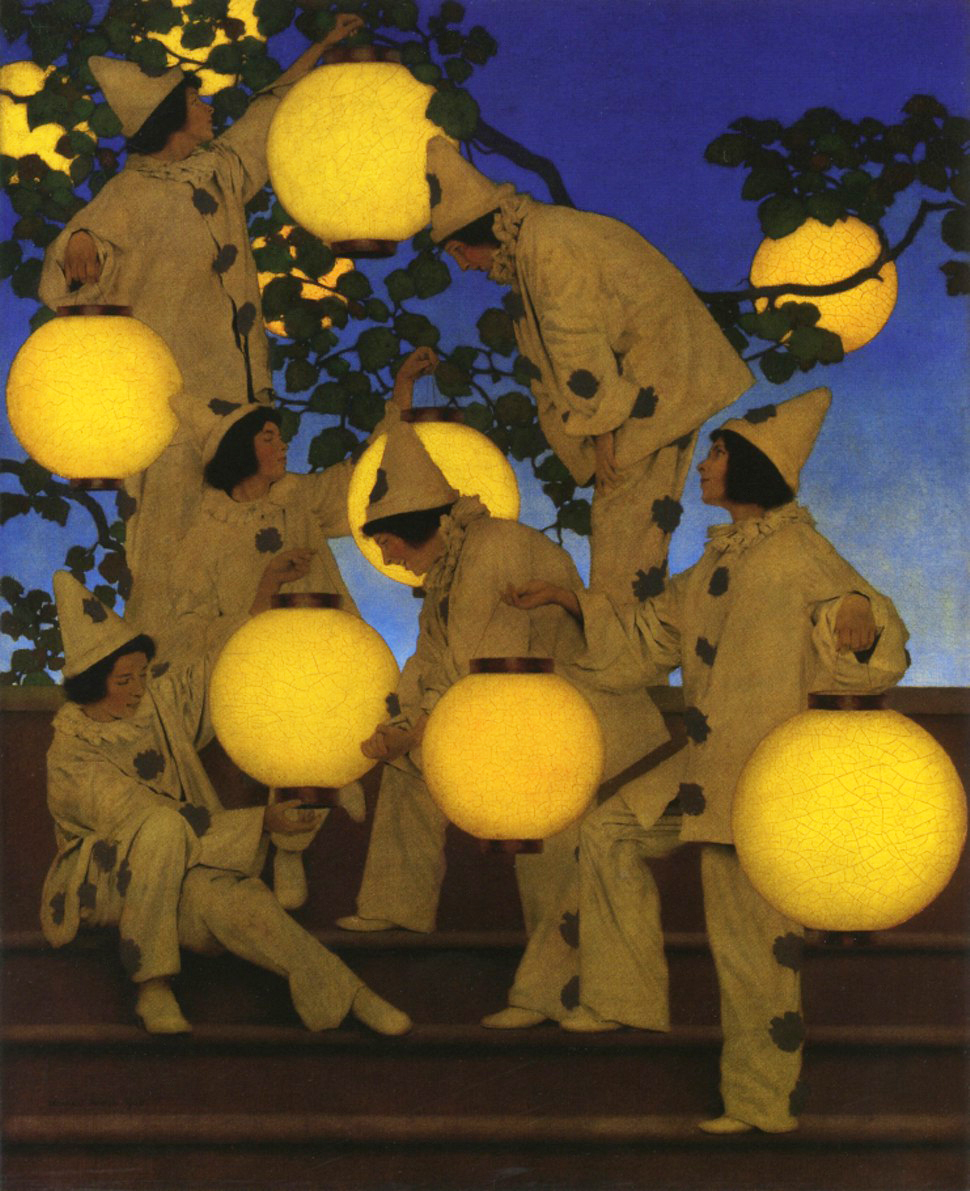
"The Lantern Bearers" (1908), created for Collier's magazine, shows Parrish's use of glazes and saturated color in an evocative night scene. Crystal Bridges Museum of American Art

Parrish entered into an artistic career that lasted for more than half a century, and which helped shape the Golden Age of illustration and American visual arts. During his career, he produced almost 900 pieces of art including calendars, greeting cards, and magazine covers. Parrish's early works were mostly in black and white.

In 1895, his work was on the Easter edition of Harper's Bazaar. He also did work for other magazines like Scribner's Magazine. One of his posters for The Century Magazine was published in Les Maîtres de l'Affiche. He also illustrated a children's book in 1897, Mother Goose in Prose written by L. Frank Baum. By 1900, Parrish was already a member of the Society of American Artists. In 1903, he traveled to Europe again to visit Italy.

Parrish took many commissions for commercial art until the 1920s. Parrish's commercial art included many prestigious projects, among which were Eugene Field's Poems of Childhood in 1904, and such traditional works as Arabian Nights in 1909. Books illustrated by Parrish are featured in A Wonder Book and Tanglewood Tales in 1910, The Golden Treasury of Songs and Lyrics in 1911, and The Knave of Hearts in 1925.

Parrish was earning over $100,000 per year by 1910, when homes could be bought for $2,000.

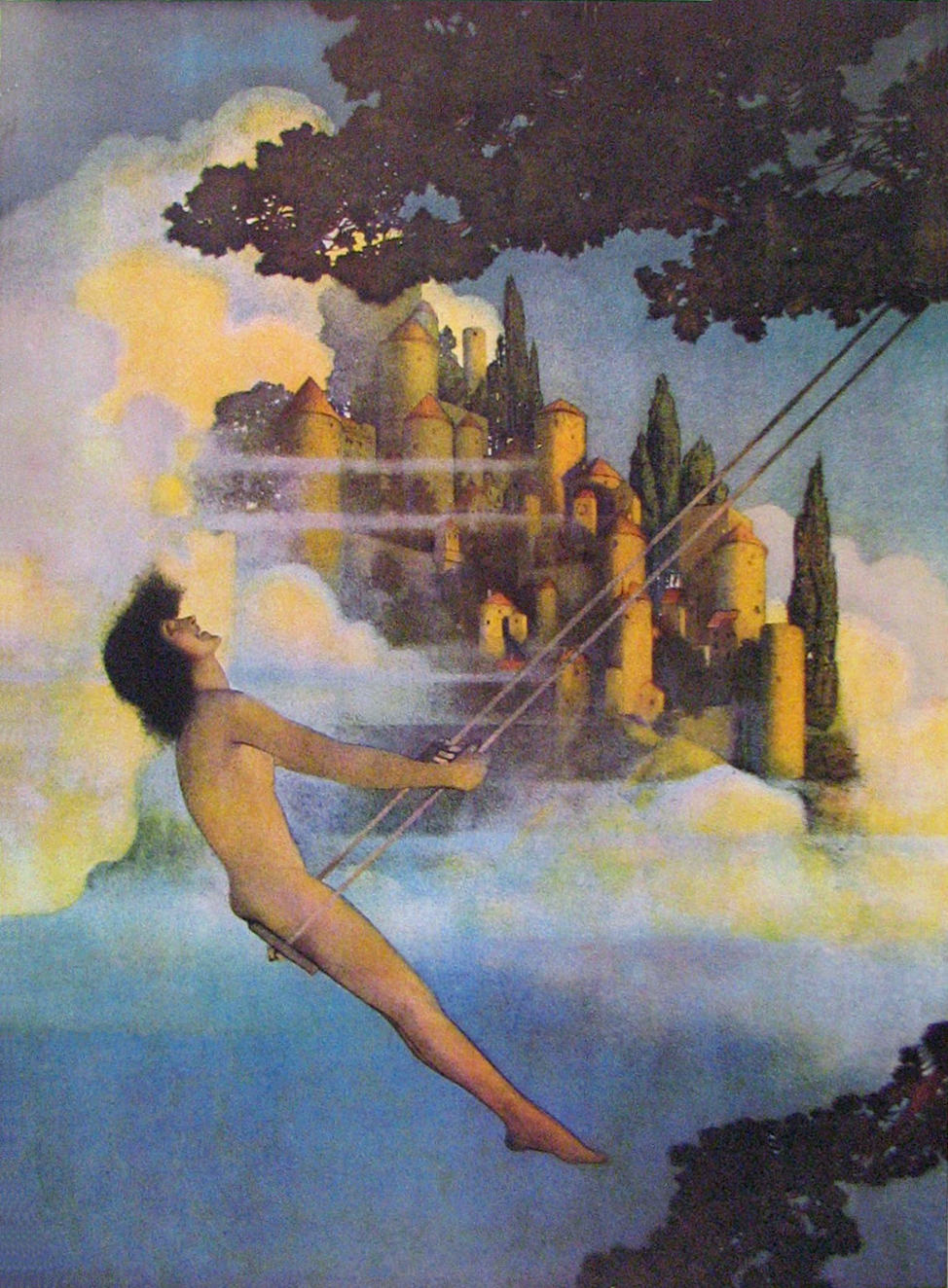
The Dinky Bird, an illustration from Poems of Childhood by Eugene Field (1904), exemplifies Parrish's characteristic use of androgynous figures.

In 1910 Parrish received a commission to create 18 panels to go into the Girls Dining Room of the Curtis Publishing Company building, then under construction at 6th and Walnut in Philadelphia. It would take him six years to finish the monumental project. In 1914, before the murals were completed, Curtis commissioned Parrish to design a 15-by-49-foot (4.6 m × 14.9 m) mural for the building lobby. Tiffany Studios constructed a favrile glass mosaic mural titled The Dream Garden, which is now a part of Pennsylvania Academy of the Fine Arts collection.

Parrish worked with popular magazines throughout the 1910s and 1920s, including Hearst's and Life. He also created advertising for companies like Wanamaker's, Edison-Mazda Lamps, Colgate, and Oneida Cutlery. Parrish worked with Collier's from 1904 to 1913. He received a contract to deal with them exclusively for six years. He also painted advertisements for D.M. Ferry Seed Company in 1916 and 1923, which helped him gain recognition in the eye of the public. His most well-known art work is Daybreak which was produced in 1923. It features female figures in a landscape scene. The painting also has undertones of Parrish blue. In the 1920s, however, Parrish turned away from illustration and concentrated on painting.

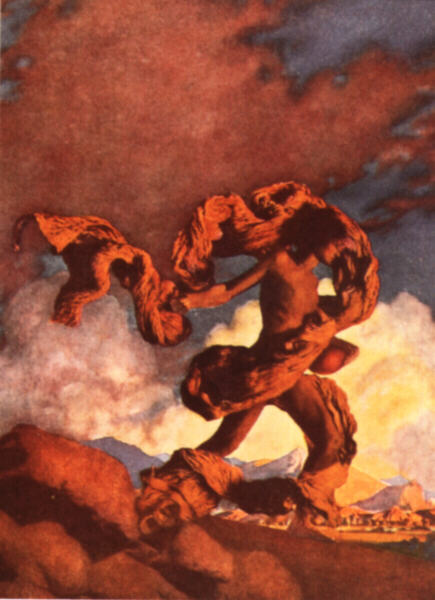
Cadmus Sowing the Dragon's Teeth (1908), created for Collier's

In his forties, Parrish began working on large murals instead of just focusing on children's books. His works of art often featured androgynous nudes in fantastical settings. He made his living from posters and calendars featuring his works. Beginning in 1904, Susan Lewin (1889–1978) posed for many works, and became Parrish's longtime assistant. From 1918 to 1934, Parrish worked on calendar illustrations for General Electric.

In 1931, Parrish declared to the Associated Press, "I'm done with girls on rocks", and opted instead to focus on landscapes. By 1935, Parrish exclusively painted landscapes. Though never as popular as his earlier works, he profited from them. He would often build scale models of the imaginary landscapes he wished to paint, using various lighting setups before deciding on a preferred view, which he would photograph as a basis for the painting (see for example, The Millpond). He lived in Plainfield, New Hampshire, near the Cornish Art Colony, and painted until he was 91 years old. He was also an avid machinist, and often referred to himself as "a mechanic who loved to paint".

== Technique ==
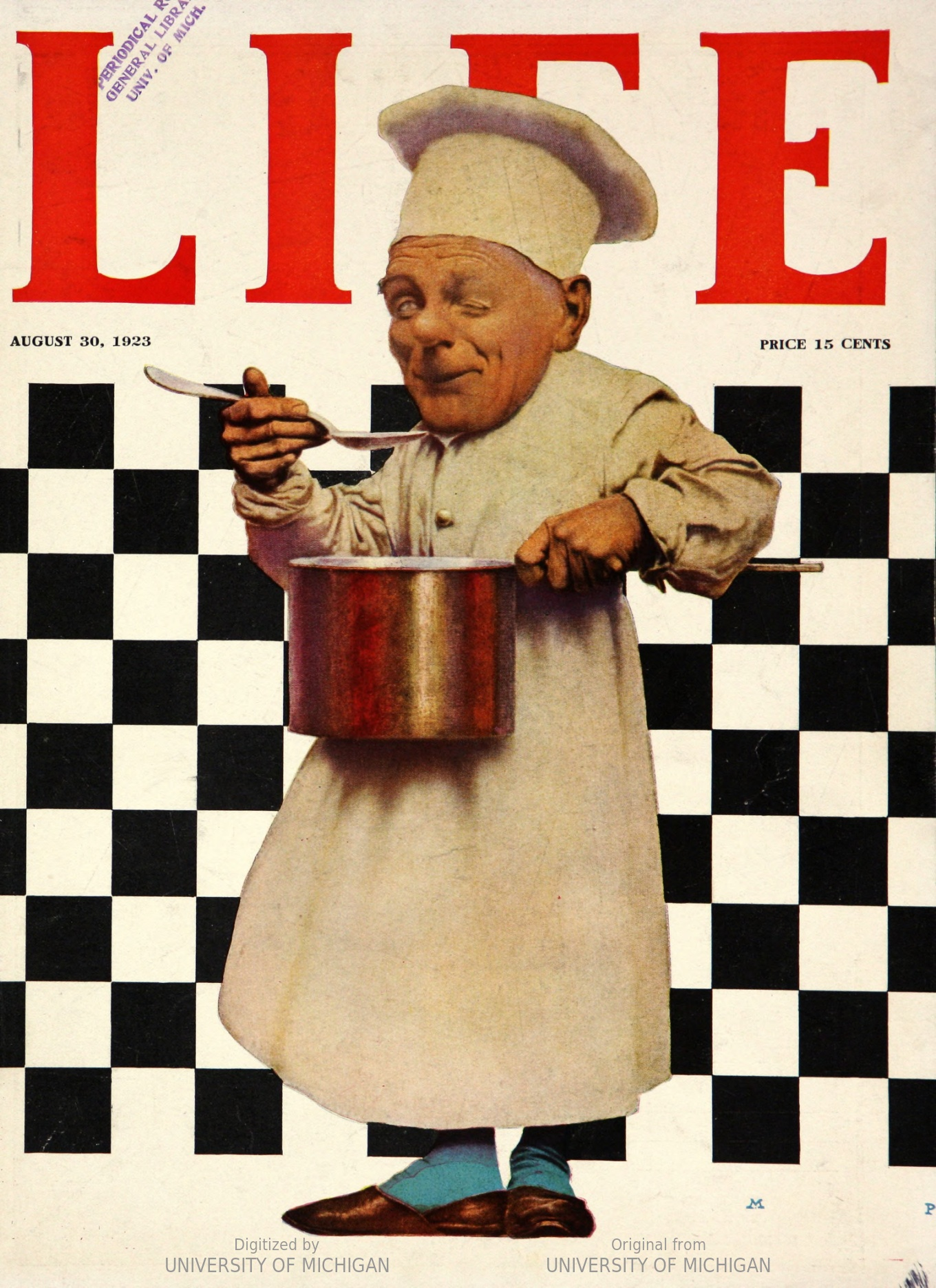
Painting for 30 Aug 1923 Life edition

Parrish's art is characterized by vibrant colors; the color Parrish blue was named after him. He achieved such luminous color through glazing. This process involves applying layers of translucent paint and oil medium (glazes) over a base rendering. Parrish usually used a blue and white monochromatic underpainting.

His paintings/illustrations were unique in that they depicted a highly idealized fantasy world that was accessible to the general public. Although one would rarely see a glimpse of that color in reality, Parrish was and still is linked with a particularly bright shade of blue that coated the skies of his landscapes. He invented a time-consuming process that involved a cobalt blue base and white undercoating, which he then coated with a series of thin alternating coatings of oil and varnish. When exposed to ultraviolet light, the dammar gum resins that Parrish employed fluoresce a shade of yellow-green, giving the painted sky its distinctive turquoise tint.

Parrish used many other innovative techniques in his paintings. He would take pictures of models in black and white geometric prints and project the image onto his works. This technique allowed for his figures to be clothed in geometric patterns, while accurately representing distortion and draping. Parrish would also create his paintings by taking pictures, enlarging, or projecting objects. He would cut these images out and put them onto his canvas. He would later cover them with clear glaze. Parrish's technique gave his paintings a more three-dimensional feel.

The outer proportions and internal divisions of Parrish's compositions were carefully calculated in accordance with geometric principles such as root rectangles and the golden ratio. In this Parrish was influenced by Jay Hambidge's theory of Dynamic Symmetry.

== Cultural influences ==
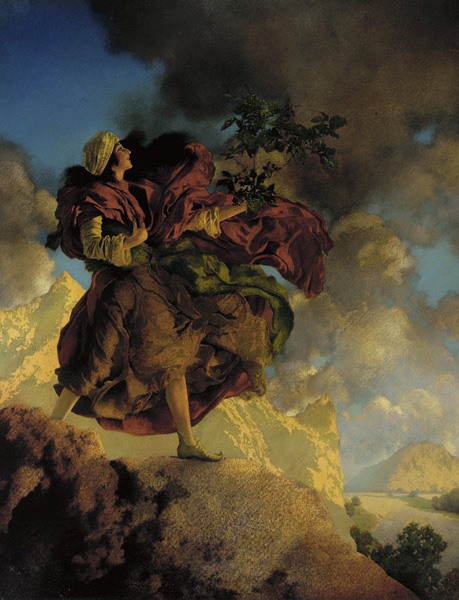
Princess Parizade Bringing Home the Singing Tree from Arabian Nights (1906)

Parrish's works continue to influence pop culture. Daybreak is seen in a treehouse in Terrence Malick's 1973 film Badlands. The cover of the 1985 Bloom County cartoon collection Penguin Dreams and Stranger Things comprises elements of Daybreak, The Garden of Allah, and The Lute Players. The poster for The Princess Bride was inspired by Daybreak. In 2001, Parrish was featured in a United States Post Office commemorative stamp series honoring American illustrators, including Parrish.

The 1986 television commercial announcing Nestle's Alpine White chocolate bar, entitled "Sweet Dreams," staged live-action representations of Parrish's Ecstasy, Dinky Bird, and Daybreak.

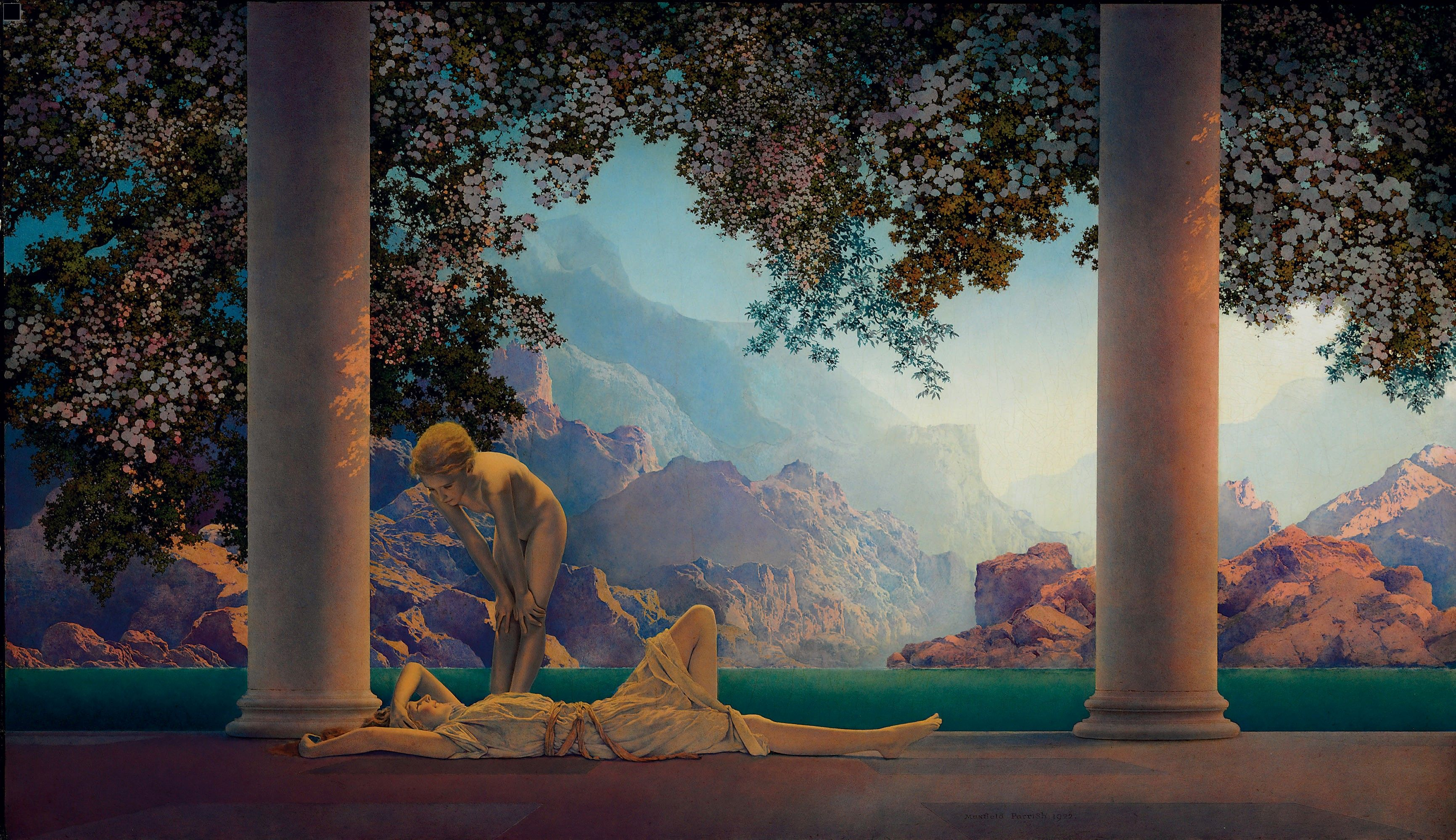
Daybreak, 1922

The Elton John album Caribou has a Parrish-inspired background. The Moody Blues album The Present uses a variation of the Parrish painting Daybreak for its cover. In 1984, Dali's Car, the British New Wave project of Peter Murphy and Mick Karn, used Daybreak as the cover art of their only album, The Waking Hour. The Irish musician Enya has been inspired by the works of Parrish. The cover art of her 1995 album The Memory of Trees is based on his painting The Young King of the Black Isles. A number of her music videos include Parrish imagery, including "Caribbean Blue".

In the 1995 music video "You Are Not Alone", Michael Jackson and his then wife Lisa Marie Presley appear semi-nude in emulation of Daybreak. The Italian singer-songwriter Angelo Branduardi's fourth album La pulce d'acqua of 1977 featured nine inlay full colour print reproductions of painter Mario Convertino's works; one of them is clearly inspired by Parrish's Stars.

The original painting of Daybreak sold in 2006 for US$7.6 million. The National Museum of American Illustration claims the largest body of his work in any collection, with sixty-nine works by Parrish including the 1910 Curtis Publishing Company's 18-panel mural commission. Some of his works are located at the Hood Museum of Art in Hanover, New Hampshire, and a few at the Metropolitan Museum of Art in New York. The San Diego Museum of Art organized and toured a collection of his work in 2005.

The American painter Norman Rockwell referred to Parrish as "my idol".

In Alan Moore's 32-issue comic series Promethea, the cover of issue #13 was noted by the artist on the cover as "after Parrish", imitating his style.

== Personal life ==
Ecstasy (1929) was widely published on a calendar for General Electric Mazda in 1930.

While studying at Drexel, Parrish met his future wife, Lydia Ambler Austin, who was a drawing teacher. The couple were married on June 1, 1895, and moved to Philadelphia. They would go on to have four children together. In 1898, Parrish moved to Plainfield, New Hampshire, with his family and built a home that was later nicknamed "The Oaks". The home and an adjacent studio were surrounded by beautiful landscapes that inspired Parrish's drawings.

Parrish suffered from tuberculosis for a time in 1900. While sick, he discovered how to mix oils and glazes to create vibrant colors.

From 1900 to 1902, Parrish painted in Saranac Lake, New York, and Castle Hot Springs, Arizona, to further recover his health.

Parrish's youngest child, Jean, posed for Ecstasy just before leaving for Smith College. Jean was the only child to follow her parents' profession.

Parrish developed arthritis. He accepted his last commission in the late 1950s. By 1960 his arthritis prevented him from painting. He died on March 30, 1966, in Plainfield, New Hampshire, at the age of 95.

== Works ==
=== Book illustrator ===
- Baum, L. F. – Mother Goose in Prose, Way & Williams, 1897
- Read, O. – Bolanyo (cover), Way & Williams, 1897
- Butler, W. M. – Whist Reference Book (frontispiece), Yorston, 1898
- Grahame, K. – The Golden Age, Lane, 1900
- Irving, W. – Knickerbocker's History of New York, Russell, 1900
- Grahame, K. – Dream Days, Lane, 1902
- Carryl, G. W. – The Garden of Years (frontispiece), Putnam, 1904
- Field, E. – Poems of Childhood, Scribner & Sons, 1904
- Wharton, E. – Italian Villas and their Gardens, Century, 1904
- Smith, A. C. – The Turquoise Cap, and The Desert, Scribner & Sons, 1905
- Wiggin, K. D. – The Arabian Nights, Scribner & Sons, 1909
- Hawthorne, N. – A Wonder Book and Tanglewood Tales, Duffield, 1910
- Scudder, H. – The Children's Book (cover), Houghton Mifflin, 1910
- Hawthorne, H. – Lure of the Garden, Century, 1911
- Palgrave, F. T. – The Golden Treasury, Duffield, 1911
- Saunders, L. – The Knave of Hearts, Scribner & Sons, 1925

=== Muralist ===
- Old King Cole – St. Regis Hotel, New York, 1906
- Pied Piper – Palace Hotel, San Francisco, 1909
- The Dream Garden - Glass mosaic executed by Louis Comfort Tiffany. Height 16' width 50′. Curtis Center, Philadelphia, 1916.

=== Stage Set Designer ===
- The Woodland Princess - Plainfield Village Town Hall, Plainfield, New Hampshire, 1916
