= The Voice (The Moody Blues song) =

1981 single by the Moody Blues

Single by the Moody Blues

from the album Long Distance Voyager
- B-side: "22,000 Days"
- Released: 23 July 1981
- Recorded: 25 April 1980
- Genre: Pop rock, new wave
- Length: 5:16 (album version); 4:08 (single version)
- Label: Threshold
- Songwriter: Justin Hayward
- Producer: Pip Williams

The Moody Blues singles chronology
"Gemini Dream" (1981)	"The Voice" (1981)	"Talking Out of Turn" (1981)

"The Voice" is a song written by Justin Hayward that was first released on the Moody Blues' 1981 album Long Distance Voyager and also as its second single. The song continued the success of their previous single "Gemini Dream", becoming a Top 40 hit on the Billboard Hot 100, where it peaked at No. 15 in October 1981. The song had previously topped the Billboard Top Rock Tracks chart for four weeks during June–July 1981. The song also reached No. 9 in Canada.

== Recording ==
"The Voice" was one of the first songs recorded for Long Distance Voyager, on 25 April 1980. Hayward plays acoustic and electric guitars, and sings the lead vocal as well as most of the harmony vocals, but John Lodge and Ray Thomas join in on the "oh oh" part in the refrain. Hayward played his guitar solo on a 1963 red Gibson ES-335.

Hayward said of writing and recording "The Voice":

It's a guitar song — a rhythm guitar song. It was one of the first things I ever did with a click track, at home. Fortunately, Graeme [Edge] was never one of those drummers who was like, "I don't like click tracks or drum machines. I want to set the tempo!" No, Graeme was great, fantastic, really took the pressure off me and said, "Sure, I'll play on top of the click track." I knew it was a tempo that suited us, that suited the way I play guitar and the way Graeme and John played. It was like "The Story in Your Eyes." It was kind of safe.

On the album version of the song, there is a 30 second synthesizer introduction leading into the song, that was developed and played by Patrick Moraz. This was an excerpt from a song Moraz had written about a year prior to "The Voice" being recorded.

== Lyrics and music ==
The lyrics reflect the insecurities Hayward was feeling at the time about his stardom and the fact the stress of continually meeting expectations and dealing with poor reviews and writer's block. The title wasn't determined until after the song was recorded and refers to the inner voice that is one's own harshest critic.

Hayward said of the song:

With "The Voice" this whole period of my life was quite a difficult one, I suppose. I was sort of searching and seeking. It was a very insecure time. I think it was for all of us, and it reflected in the album as well. I was trying to relearn a lot of things in my life and set some kind of standard. I didn't feel I had a lot of things in common with a lot of things that were going on around me. I felt apart from it. I was kind of expressing those insecurities, really."

Hayward also said that it's a "song that means a lot to me, every word. But don't ask me to explain it, please. It just means a lot."

The Star Press critic Kim Teverbaugh said of the music that it is "an up-tempo rock number like the band is fond of having open its albums." Music journalist Geoffrey Freakes described the music as "pop-rock". Freakes said that "The choral harmonies are sharp, and Hayward's guitar fills workmanlike with John Lodge and Graeme Edge's sold rhythm driving the song at a brisk pace". The song is written in the key of E minor.

== Reception ==
According to AllMusic critic Dave Connolly, the song "is a sweeping and majestic call to adventure." Billboard described it as "a texturally lush piece of pop in the best tradition of [the Moody Blues'] earlier work". Record World said that "The symphonic arrangement envelops Justin Hayward's dramatic vocal." Variety said it had the potential to go to number 1, saying that "the well-crafted pop melodies in both verse and chorus and the use of synthesized strings vividly recall the Moody's in their original incarnation" and also praised Pip Williams' "richly imaginative production."

Teverbaugh praised Moraz' keyboards for "[pulling] the group into the '80s" and said that the lyrics are "worth following." Ottawa Citizen critic Bill Provick said that "There are plenty of traditional Moody Blues touches but also a freshness and verve that is quite captivating – especially for longtime fans." Post-Gazette critic Gary Graff called it a "melodic rocker that leaves you feeling pretty good" and praised Hayward's lead guitar and Moraz' keyboards. Daily Press critic Mike Diana said that it has "the [band's] venerated blend of synthetic and real string sections wafting around the gushing vocal of Justin Hayward." Sacramento Bee critic Bob Sylva praised its "driving pop rhythms." News-Democrat critic Roger Schlueter praised the harmonies but criticized the unimaginative lyrics, particularly some simplistic rhymes.

Classic Rock critic Malcolm Dome rated it as the Moody Blues' 5th greatest song, saying that the song "offers hope for the future, as long as people take control of their lives and events." Ultimate Classic Rock critic Nick DeRiso rated it as the Moody Blues' 6th greatest song, saying that it is "one of the last [Moody Blues songs] to so deftly marry the mystical elements of Hayward's classic songcraft with [a more] modern approach."

== Personnel ==
- Justin Hayward: electric and acoustic guitars, lead vocals
- John Lodge: bass guitar, backing vocals
- Ray Thomas: tambourine, backing vocals
- Patrick Moraz: piano, mellotron, Oberheim custom dual-manual 8-voice synthesizer, Yamaha CS80, Roland Jupiter 8, Minimoog
- Graeme Edge: drums

== Chart performance ==
=== Weekly charts ===
Chart (1981)	Peak position
Australia KMR	91
Canada RPM Top Singles	9
Netherlands	46
U.S. Billboard Hot 100	15
U.S. Billboard Mainstream Rock	1
U.S. Billboard Adult Contemporary	16
U.S. Cash Box Top 100	15

=== Year-end charts ===
Chart (1981)	Rank
Canada	62
U.S. (Joel Whitburn's Pop Annual)	97
U.S. Cash Box	100

== See also ==
- List of Billboard Mainstream Rock number-one songs of the 1980s
