= Talking Out of Turn =

1981 single by the Moody Blues

Single by the Moody Blues

from the album Long Distance Voyager
- B-side: "Veteran Cosmic Rocker"
- Released: 10 November 1981
- Recorded: Spring 1980
- Genre: Progressive rock
- Length: 7:18 (Album version); 4:12 (Single version)
- Label: Threshold
- Songwriter: John Lodge
- Producer: Pip Williams

The Moody Blues singles chronology
"The Voice" (1981)	"Talking Out of Turn" (1981)	"Blue World" (1983)

"Talking Out of Turn" is a 1981 single written by John Lodge and first released by the Moody Blues on their 1981 album Long Distance Voyager. It was also released as the third single from the album in November 1981 with "Veteran Cosmic Rocker" on the B-side.

The song lasts more than seven minutes long. It reached number 65 on the Billboard Hot 100 and number 60 on Cash Box. It did better in Canada, where it reached number 27.

== Music and lyrics ==
The instrumentation is augmented by the New World Philharmonic Orchestra, with an arrangement scored by producer Pip Williams and keyboardist Pat Moraz. Moraz also used a music sequencer to create the "spronging" sound that serves as the song's musical hook, which Williams felt gives the song a modern sound. Music journalist Geoffrey Freakes described Moraz' intro to the song as sounding like his former band Yes and described Justin Hayward's guitar solos as being "almost histrionic by his standards." At the end of the song, violins prominently play a variation on the tune of the chorus.

The Star Press critic Kim Teverbaugh described the lyrics as being "about love slipping away." Lodge said:

It really is about talking out of turn. I think we all have this situation, where sometimes you take a bit too much from someone – and I don't mean materially; I'm talking about emotionally – and you can just keep talking about it and you suddenly realize that you shouldn't have said anything, really.

Williams called it "An absolute favorite of mine and one of the best [John Lodge] songs ever."

== Reception ==
Billboard called it a "soothingly melodic song highlighted by John Lodge's vocal." Record World said that "space-age synthesizers introduce Justin Hayward's relaxed vocal" and commented on the "rich harmony choruses."

AllMusic critic Dave Connolly called it a "winning number." Upon the album release, Teverbaugh said that it "features what is probably the best use of strings on a song this year" and also praised Justin Hayward's "stinging guitar [runs]" that punctuate almost every line. Ottawa Citizen critic Bill Provick said that it deserved to be a hit single and that "Plush without being mushy, it takes on a marvelously haunting air under repeated listenings with a fine chorus that lingers on nicely in one's head." Sacramento Bee critic Bob Sylva called it a "moving ballad" with a "sweet lyric" and "expressive, expert guitar work by Justin Hayward", but also found it to be "a tad too long and repetitive." Daily Press critic Mike Diana said that "the Moody's go south of the border for laughs and some of Lodge's useless blathering." Roanoke Times writer Ben Cromer called it "syrupy and downright boring." News-Democrat critic Roger Schlueter criticized the "unimaginative lyrics."

== Other appearances ==
"Talking Out of Turn" was included in the set list at most of the Moody Blues' live concerts throughout the 1980s. Subsequently, it was played live occasionally, with Lodge playing acoustic guitar.

The instrumental final minute of the song closes the first hour of The Mike Malloy Show each weekday evening.

== Chart history ==
Chart (1981–82)	Peak position
Canada RPM Top Singles	27
US Billboard Hot 100	65
US Cash Box Top 100	60

== Personnel ==
- John Lodge – lead vocals, 12-string acoustic guitar, bass
- Justin Hayward – backing vocals and acoustic & electric guitars
- Ray Thomas – backing vocals
- Patrick Moraz – Polymoog, Yamaha CS80, vocoder and Minimoog
- Graeme Edge – drums, overdubbed cymbals and Simmons drums
