= Driftwood (Moody Blues song) =

Single by the Moody Blues

from the album Octave
- B-side: "I'm Your Man"
- Released: 6 October 1978
- Recorded: January–April 1978
- Genre: Rock
- Length: 5:02 (album version); 4:31 (single version); 3:56 (promo version)
- Label: Decca
- Songwriter(s): Justin Hayward
- Producer(s): Tony Clarke

The Moody Blues singles chronology
"Steppin' in a Slide Zone" (1978)	"Driftwood" (1978)	"Gemini Dream" (1981)

"Driftwood" is a 1978 single by the English progressive rock band the Moody Blues. It was the second single released from the album Octave, after "Steppin' in a Slide Zone". Written by Justin Hayward, "Driftwood" is a slow love ballad, in a similar manner to "Nights in White Satin" and "Never Comes the Day".

== Background ==
Billboard described "Driftwood" as a "lush romantic ballad." Cash Box called it "a smooth and spacy ballad about beaching on the shore of life" and also praised the vocal performance.

"Driftwood" was also the final single to feature keyboardist Mike Pinder, who left the band shortly before the completion of Octave for personal reasons. He would later be replaced by former Yes keyboardist Patrick Moraz.

Shortly after release, a promotional video was recorded for "Driftwood". The video features Patrick Moraz on the keyboards, although Mike Pinder is playing the keyboards in the actual recording. The song also includes an alto saxophone which is played by session musician R.A. Martin, although Ray Thomas is depicted playing the alto saxophone in the video.

== Personnel ==
- Justin Hayward: vocals, acoustic guitar, electric guitar
- John Lodge: bass guitar
- Mike Pinder: keyboards
- Ray Thomas: tambourine
- Graeme Edge: drums, percussion

=== Additional personnel ===
- R.A. Martin: horns, alto saxophone

== Chart success ==
The record spent seven weeks on the U.S. Billboard charts and peaked at No. 59. It also reached No. 38 on the Adult Contemporary charts. In Canada it reached No. 60.
