= Pip Williams =

English record producer and guitarist

- Born: Philip Williams; 7 October 1947 (age 78); Hillingdon, Middlesex, England
- Occupations: Musician, lecturer in music technology
- Years active: 1965– present

Philip "Pip" Williams (born 7 October 1947), sometimes spelt Phillip, is an English record producer, arranger, and guitarist. He is best known for producing albums for Status Quo and The Moody Blues, but has also worked with a large number of well-known musicians. He has also supervised the orchestra parts and orchestra arrangements for the Finnish symphonic metal band Nightwish.

As of 2023 Williams teaches music technology at the University of West London.

== Early life ==
Philip (or Phillip) Williams was born on 7 October 1947 in Hillingdon, Middlesex.

He became inspired to play the guitar after listening to records by The Shadows and Buddy Holly, and trained as a musician.

== Career ==
Williams produced more than 170 recordings, in many genres of music, including successful collaborations with Status Quo and The Moody Blues.

Williams started his musical career as a guitarist and session musician in 1962, playing in Hamburg, Germany. He worked with American soul singer Jimmy Ruffin, as his musical director. He became lead guitarist of west London touring band, The Sovereigns, formed in mid-1965. In late 1966, The Sovereigns were signed to King Records and cut one 45 rpm record, released in January 1967. This included Williams' and Freddie Tillyer's "Bring Me Home Love". After this Williams became lead guitarist for The Fantastics. then with Jimmy James and the Vagabonds in July 1969.

Progressing from performer to session musician in the early 1970s under the patronage of Sweet producer Phil Wainman, he became one of the most in-demand session guitarists of the era, playing on early hit records for Sweet including "Funny Funny", "Co-Co", "Poppa Joe" and "Little Willy", and on The Walker Brothers' hit "No Regrets".

He moved into record production in the late 1970s. His work for Graham Bonnet attracted the attention of Status Quo, who hired him to produce their album Rockin' All Over the World. He produced a further nine albums for the group, including In Search of the Fourth Chord.

He is also known for producing The Moody Blues albums Long Distance Voyager and The Present, the former being a huge hit in the United States. The album took two months to record, and both Justin Hayward and John Lodge attributed much of its success to Williams.

He produced Kiki Dee's 1981 album Perfect Timing, which included her duet with Elton John, "Loving You Is Sweeter Than Ever", and a hit single, "Star". In 1983 he produced Ring of Changes for Barclay James Harvest.

In 1984 he produced "I Should Have Known Better" for Jim Diamond, which topped the UK Singles Chart. Other collaborators include Shirley Bassey, Richard O'Brien, Dr. Feelgood, Bucks Fizz, Kevin Ayers, Geordie, and Uriah Heep (Sonic Origami). He also produced and co-wrote a number of tracks on Sweet's 1980 album, Waters Edge, and worked with their singer, Brian Connolly, on a number of his solo efforts.

Williams is also a prolific arranger, from the string arrangements for the Moody Blues and Colin Blunstone, to the oriental ostinato patterns on Carl Douglas' "Kung Fu Fighting". Other collaborators in this field include Barbara Dickson, Ringo Starr, The Sensational Alex Harvey Band, and The Kinks. More recent work in this field was with the Finnish symphonic metal group Nightwish, having contributed orchestral arrangements for their 2004 album, Once, its 2007 follow up Dark Passion Play; their 2011 album Imaginaerum; their 2015 album, Endless Forms Most Beautiful; and its 2020 follow up Human. :II: Nature.. He also worked on the band's leader's first solo album, Music Inspired by the Life and Times of Scrooge.

Williams recorded, produced and mixed a live album for the Bonzo Dog Doo-Dah Band, Wrestle Poodles...And Win. He also orchestrated several songs for Indica on their 2010 album A Way Away.

Since 2004 Williams has been a course leader teaching music technology at University of West London, Ealing, London.

== Personal life ==
Williams married in 1969.
