= Gold (The Moody Blues album) =

2005 greatest hits album by The Moody Blues

Greatest hits album by The Moody Blues
- Released: 1 March 2005
- Recorded: 1967–2003
- Genre: Rock, symphonic rock, progressive rock, psychedelic rock, pop rock
- Length: 155:00
- Label: Polydor; Universal
- Producer: Tony Clarke; Pip Williams; Tony Visconti; Alan Tarney; The Moody Blues

The Moody Blues chronology
December (2003)	Gold (2005)	Lovely to See You: Live (2005)

Professional ratings
Review scores
Source	Rating
AllMusic	4/5 stars

Gold is a compilation album by The Moody Blues, released in 2005 by Polydor Records as part of Polydor's Gold series.

== Track listing ==
All songs were written by Justin Hayward and performed by the Moody Blues, except where noted.

Disc 1
No.	Title	Writer(s)	Original album	Length
1.	"Tuesday Afternoon"		Days of Future Passed, 1967	4:11
2.	"Nights in White Satin" (Single edit)		Days of Future Passed	4:25
3.	"Ride My See-Saw"	John Lodge	In Search of the Lost Chord, 1968	3:43
4.	"Legend of a Mind"	Ray Thomas	In Search of the Lost Chord	6:38
5.	"Voices in the Sky"		In Search of the Lost Chord	3:31
6.	"Lovely to See You"		On the Threshold of a Dream, 1969	2:36
7.	"Never Comes the Day"		On the Threshold of a Dream	4:42
8.	"Gypsy (Of a Strange and Distant Time)"		To Our Children's Children's Children, 1969	3:34
9.	"Candle of Life"	Lodge	To Our Children's Children's Children	4:13
10.	"Watching and Waiting"	Hayward, Thomas	To Our Children's Children's Children	4:15
11.	"Question"		A Question of Balance, 1970	5:45
12.	"Melancholy Man"	Mike Pinder	A Question of Balance	5:46
13.	"The Story in Your Eyes"		Every Good Boy Deserves Favour, 1971	3:05
14.	"Lost in a Lost World"	Pinder	Seventh Sojourn, 1972	4:40
15.	"New Horizons"		Seventh Sojourn	5:11
16.	"Isn't Life Strange"	Lodge	Seventh Sojourn	6:09
17.	"I'm Just a Singer (In a Rock and Roll Band)"	Lodge	Seventh Sojourn	4:16
Total length:				76:00

Disc 2
No.	Title	Writer(s)	Original album	Length
1.	"Remember Me (My Friend)" (Single edit) (Justin Hayward & John Lodge)	Hayward, Lodge	Blue Jays, 1975	3:54
2.	"Blue Guitar" (Justin Hayward & John Lodge with 10cc (though Lodge doesn't perform on the track))		Non-album single, 1975	3:38
3.	"Steppin' in a Slide Zone"	Lodge	Octave, 1978	5:30
4.	"Had to Fall in Love"		Octave	3:42
5.	"Driftwood" (Edited version)		Octave	4:25
6.	"Forever Autumn" (Edited version) (Justin Hayward & Richard Burton)	Jeff Wayne, Gary Osborne, Paul Vigrass	Jeff Wayne's Musical Version of The War of the Worlds, 1978	4:17
7.	"The Voice"		Long Distance Voyager, 1981	5:13
8.	"Talking Out of Turn" (Single edit)	Lodge	Long Distance Voyager	4:57
9.	"Gemini Dream"	Hayward, Lodge	Long Distance Voyager	4:06
10.	"Blue World"		The Present, 1983	5:10
11.	"Sitting at the Wheel"	Lodge	The Present	5:36
12.	"Your Wildest Dreams"		The Other Side of Life, 1986	4:50
13.	"I Know You're Out There Somewhere"		Sur la Mer, 1988	6:36
14.	"Say It with Love"		Keys of the Kingdom, 1991	3:54
15.	"Bless the Wings (That Bring You Back)" (Orchestral mix)		Keys of the Kingdom	4:01
16.	"Strange Times"	Hayward, Lodge	Strange Times, 1999	4:30
17.	"December Snow"		December, 2003	5:10
Total length:				79:00

== Personnel ==
=== Disc 01 ===
- Justin Hayward – guitar, vocals
- John Lodge – bass, guitar, vocals
- Michael Pinder – keyboards, vocals
- Ray Thomas – vocals, flute, percussion, harmonica
- Graeme Edge – drums, percussion, vocals

=== Disc 02 ===
Track 01: Blue Jays

- Justin Hayward – guitar, vocals
- John Lodge – bass, vocals
- Kirk Duncan – piano
- Jim Cockey – violin
- Tom Tompkins – viola
- Tim Tompkins – cello
- Graham Deakin – drums

Track 02: Blue Jays with 10cc

- Justin Hayward – guitar, lead vocals
- Lol Creme – guitar, vocals
- Kevin Godley – drums, vocals
- John Lodge – bass
- Eric Stewart – keyboards, vocals

Tracks 03–05:

- Justin Hayward – guitar, vocals
- John Lodge – bass, guitar, vocals
- Michael Pinder – keyboards, vocals
- Ray Thomas – vocals, flute, percussion, harmonica
- Graeme Edge – drums, percussion, vocals

Track 06:

- See above

Tracks 07–13:

- Justin Hayward – guitar, vocals
- John Lodge – bass, guitar, vocals
- Ray Thomas – vocals, flute, percussion, harmonica
- Graeme Edge – drums, percussion, vocals
- Patrick Moraz – keyboards

Tracks 14–16:

- Justin Hayward – guitar, vocals
- John Lodge – guitar, vocals
- Ray Thomas – vocals, flute, percussion
- Graeme Edge – drums, percussion, vocals

Track 17:

- Justin Hayward – guitar, vocals
- John Lodge – bass, guitar, vocals
- Graeme Edge – drums, percussion, vocals
