= Time Traveller (The Moody Blues album) =

Box set by The Moody Blues
- Released: 27 September 1994 (5 Disc); 5 March 1996 (4 Disc)
- Recorded: 1967–1994
- Genre: Rock
- Length: 307:42
- Label: Polydor; PolyGram
- Producer: Various

The Moody Blues chronology
A Night at Red Rocks with the Colorado Symphony Orchestra (1993)	Time Traveller (1994)	The Best of the Moody Blues (1996)

Professional ratings
Review scores
Source	Rating
AllMusic link	4.5/5 stars

Time Traveller is a box set by British rock band The Moody Blues, released in 1994.

The set is presented in chronological order, beginning with the 1966 addition of Justin Hayward and John Lodge (no material from the pre-Hayward/Lodge era was included). The set includes several previously unreleased or rare tracks, tracks from the 1975 Hayward/Lodge side-project Blue Jays, the track "Forever Autumn" from Jeff Wayne's 1978 album War of the Worlds featuring Hayward on lead vocals and a new 1994 track, "This is the Moment", which had been released earlier that year as a contribution to the 1994 FIFA album Soccer Rocks the Globe.

Originally released as a 5-CD set, the fifth CD contains "This is the Moment" plus eight live recordings that were leftover from the original 1993 release of A Night at Red Rocks. These tracks were later included in the 2003 deluxe re-release of that album.

In 1996 Time Traveller was re-released as a 4-CD box set with CD 5 removed, thus this version of the set ends at the 1991 Keys of the Kingdom album.

== Track listing ==
=== Disc One ===
All tracks performed by The Moody Blues

Tracks 1, 3–4, 9, 11, 13 and 15 written by Justin Hayward, tracks 2, 10 and 18–20 by Mike Pinder, track 5 by Hayward, Graeme Edge and Peter Knight, track 6 by Edge and John Lodge, tracks 7 and 14 by Ray Thomas, track 8 by Lodge, tracks 12 and 17 by Edge and track 16 by Hayward and Thomas

No.	Title	Place of Origin	Length
1.	"Fly Me High"	Non-album single (1967)	2:53
2.	"Love and Beauty"	Non-album single (1967)	2:23
3.	"Cities"	"Nights in White Satin" single B-side (1967)	2:21
4.	"Tuesday Afternoon (Forever Afternoon)"	Days of Future Passed (1967)	4:47
5.	"The Night: Nights in White Satin/Late Lament"	Days of Future Passed (1967)	7:40
6.	"Departure/Ride My See-Saw"	In Search of the Lost Chord (1968)	4:22
7.	"Legend of a Mind"	In Search of the Lost Chord (1968)	6:35
8.	"House of Four Doors (Parts 1 & 2)"	In Search of the Lost Chord (1968, two separate tracks combined together for Time Traveller)	6:00
9.	"Voices in the Sky"	In Search of the Lost Chord (1968)	3:29
10.	"The Best Way to Travel"	In Search of the Lost Chord (1968)	3:13
11.	"The Actor"	In Search of the Lost Chord (1968)	4:39
12.	"In the Beginning"	On the Threshold of a Dream (1969)	2:07
13.	"Lovely to See You"	On the Threshold of a Dream (1969)	2:34
14.	"Dear Diary"	On the Threshold of a Dream (1969)	3:56
15.	"Never Comes the Day"	On the Threshold of a Dream (1969)	4:40
16.	"Are You Sitting Comfortably?"	On the Threshold of a Dream (1969)	3:29
17.	"The Dream"	On the Threshold of a Dream (1969)	0:53
18.	"Have You Heard (Part 1)"	On the Threshold of a Dream (1969)	1:23
19.	"The Voyage"	On the Threshold of a Dream (1969)	4:08
20.	"Have You Heard (Part 2)"	On the Threshold of a Dream (1969)	2:38

=== Disc Two ===
All tracks performed by The Moody Blues

Tracks 1, 5 and 11 written by Edge, tracks 2, 4, 8–10, 12, 14, 17 and 19 by Hayward, tracks 3, 7, 13 and 18 by Lodge, track 6 by Pinder and Lodge, track 9 by Hayward and Thomas, tracks 15 and 20 by Pinder and track 16 by Hayward, Lodge, Edge, Thomas and Pinder

No.	Title	Place of Origin	Length
1.	"Higher and Higher"	To Our Children's Children's Children (1969)	3:58
2.	"Gypsy (Of a Strange and Distant Time)"	To Our Children's Children's Children (1969)	3:31
3.	"Eyes of a Child"	To Our Children's Children's Children (1969)	3:11
4.	"I Never Thought I'd Live to Be a Hundred"	To Our Children's Children's Children (1969)	1:05
5.	"Beyond"	To Our Children's Children's Children (1969)	2:58
6.	"Out and In"	To Our Children's Children's Children (1969)	3:41
7.	"Candle of Life"	To Our Children's Children's Children (1969)	4:12
8.	"I Never Thought I'd Live to be a Million"	To Our Children's Children's Children (1969)	0:33
9.	"Watching and Waiting"	To Our Children's Children's Children (1969)	4:14
10.	"Question"	A Question of Balance (1970)	5:39
11.	"Don't You Feel Small"	A Question of Balance (1970)	2:35
12.	"It's Up to You"	A Question of Balance (1970)	3:11
13.	"Minstrel's Song"	A Question of Balance (1970)	4:24
14.	"Dawning Is the Day"	A Question of Balance (1970)	4:24
15.	"Melancholy Man"	A Question of Balance (1970)	5:44
16.	"Procession"	Every Good Boy Deserves Favour (1971)	4:41
17.	"The Story in Your Eyes"	Every Good Boy Deserves Favour (1971)	2:52
18.	"One More Time to Live"	Every Good Boy Deserves Favour (1971)	5:39
19.	"You Can Never Go Home"	Every Good Boy Deserves Favour (1971)	4:14
20.	"My Song"	Every Good Boy Deserves Favour (1971)	6:18

=== Disc Three ===
All tracks performed by The Moody Blues except tracks 7–13 performed by Justin Hayward and John Lodge with track 13 featuring backing by 10cc

Track 1 written by Pinder, tracks 2, 7, 9, 11–13, 15–16 by Hayward, track 3 by Thomas, tracks 4, 6, 10 and 14 by Lodge, track 5 by Hayward and Edge and track 8 by Hayward and Lodge

No.	Title	Place of Origin	Length
1.	"Lost in a Lost World"	Seventh Sojourn (1972)	4:41
2.	"New Horizons"	Seventh Sojourn (1972)	5:10
3.	"For My Lady"	Seventh Sojourn (1972)	3:57
4.	"Isn't Life Strange"	Seventh Sojourn (1972)	6:08
5.	"You and Me"	Seventh Sojourn (1972)	4:19
6.	"I'm Just a Singer (In a Rock and Roll Band)"	Seventh Sojourn (1972)	4:17
7.	"This Morning"	Blue Jays (1975)	5:55
8.	"Remember Me (My Friend)"	Blue Jays (1975)	5:27
9.	"My Brother"	Blue Jays (1975)	3:27
10.	"Saved by the Music"	Blue Jays (1975)	6:08
11.	"I Dreamed Last Night"	Blue Jays (1975)	4:26
12.	"When You Wake Up"	Blue Jays (1975)	5:19
13.	"Blue Guitar"	Non-album single (1975)	3:39
14.	"Steppin' in a Slide Zone"	Octave (1978)	5:28
15.	"Driftwood"	Octave (1978)	4:25
16.	"The Day We Meet Again"	Octave (1978)	6:18

=== Disc Four ===
All tracks performed by The Moody Blues except track 1 performed by Justin Hayward and Jeff Wayne

All tracks written by Hayward except track 1 by Jeff Wayne, Paul Vigrass and Gary Osborne, tracks 3, 6 and 14 by Lodge and track 4 by Hayward and Lodge

No.	Title	Place of Origin	Length
1.	"Forever Autumn (edited)"	Jeff Wayne's Musical Version of The War of the Worlds (1978)	4:31
2.	"The Voice"	Long Distance Voyager (1981)	5:16
3.	"Talking Out of Turn"	Long Distance Voyager (1981)	7:16
4.	"Gemini Dream"	Long Distance Voyager (1981)	4:05
5.	"Blue World"	The Present (1983)	5:10
6.	"Sitting at the Wheel"	The Present (1983)	5:37
7.	"Running Water"	The Present (1983)	3:21
8.	"Your Wildest Dreams"	The Other Side of Life (1986)	4:50
9.	"The Other Side of Life"	The Other Side of Life (1986)	6:50
10.	"I Know You're Out There Somewhere"	Sur la Mer (1988)	6:37
11.	"No More Lies"	Sur la Mer (1988)	5:14
12.	"Say It with Love"	Keys of the Kingdom (1991)	3:55
13.	"Bless the Wings (That Bring You Back)"	Keys of the Kingdom (1991)	5:09
14.	"Lean on Me (Tonight)"	Keys of the Kingdom (1991)	4:57
15.	"Highway"	"Say It With Love" maxi-single B-side (1991)	4:35

=== Disc Five (not included in 1996 re-release) ===
All tracks performed by The Moody Blues

All tracks written by Hayward except track 1 by Frank Wildhorn and Leslie Bricusse, track 5 by Lodge, track 8 by Thomas and track 9 by Hayward and Lodge

No.	Title	Place of Origin	Length
1.	"This Is the Moment"	Soccer Rocks the Globe (1994)	4:39
2.	"The Story in Your Eyes"	Live at Red Rocks Amphitheatre (1992, previously unreleased, later included on 2003 Deluxe Edition of A Night at Red Rocks)	3:43
3.	"Voices in the Sky"	Live at Red Rocks Amphitheatre (1992, previously unreleased, later included on 2003 Deluxe Edition of A Night at Red Rocks)	4:02
4.	"New Horizons"	Live at Red Rocks Amphitheatre (1992, previously unreleased, later included on 2003 Deluxe Edition of A Night at Red Rocks)	5:58
5.	"Emily's Song"	Live at Red Rocks Amphitheatre (1992, previously unreleased, later included on 2003 Deluxe Edition of A Night at Red Rocks)	4:31
6.	"Bless the Wings (That Bring You Back)"	Live at Red Rocks Amphitheatre (1992, previously unreleased, later included on 2003 Deluxe Edition of A Night at Red Rocks)	4:16
7.	"Say It with Love"	Live at Red Rocks Amphitheatre (1992, previously unreleased, later included on 2003 Deluxe Edition of A Night at Red Rocks)	4:52
8.	"Legend of a Mind"	Live at Red Rocks Amphitheatre (1992, previously unreleased, later included on 2003 Deluxe Edition of A Night at Red Rocks)	9:01
9.	"Gemini Dream"	Live at Red Rocks Amphitheatre (1992, previously unreleased, later included on 2003 Deluxe Edition of A Night at Red Rocks)	4:27

== Certifications ==
Region	Certification	Certified units/sales
United States (RIAA)	Gold	500,000^{^}
^{^} Shipments figures based on certification alone.
