= The Best of The Moody Blues =

The Best of the Moody Blues

Compilation album by The Moody Blues
- Released: 23 September 1996
- Recorded: 1964 – 1988
- Genre: Rock
- Length: 78:20
- Labels: Deram, Polydor
- Producer: Various

The Moody Blues chronology
Time Traveller (1994)	The Best of the Moody Blues (1996)	Anthology (1998)

Original cover (changed shortly after release)

Professional ratings
Review scores
Source	Rating
AllMusic	4/5 stars

The Best of The Moody Blues is a compilation album by the British progressive rock band The Moody Blues, released on 23 September 1996.

The album marked the first time the band's only UK No. 1 single, 1964's "Go Now", was included on an official Moody Blues compilation album.

== Track listing ==
All tracks performed by The Moody Blues except track 10 performed by Justin Hayward and John Lodge (with backing by 10cc) and track 12 performed by Justin Hayward and Jeff Wayne

All songs written by Justin Hayward except track 1 by Larry Banks and Milton Bennett, tracks 4, 8, 9 and 11 by John Lodge, track 12 by Jeff Wayne, Paul Vigrass and Gary Osborne and track 14 by Justin Hayward and John Lodge

No.	Title	Original album	Length
1.	"Go Now"	The Magnificent Moodies (1965, single released 1964)	3:11
2.	"Tuesday Afternoon (Forever Afternoon)"	Days of Future Passed (1967)	4:09
3.	"Nights in White Satin (single mix)"	Days of Future Passed (1967)	4:25
4.	"Ride My See-Saw"	In Search of the Lost Chord (1968)	3:42
5.	"Voices in the Sky"	In Search of the Lost Chord (1968)	3:29
6.	"Question (single mix)"	A Question of Balance (1970)	5:44
7.	"The Story in Your Eyes"	Every Good Boy Deserves Favour (1971)	3:05
8.	"Isn't Life Strange"	Seventh Sojourn (1972)	6:05
9.	"I'm Just a Singer (In a Rock and Roll Band)"	Seventh Sojourn (1972)	4:16
10.	"Blue Guitar"	Non-album single (1975, added to the 1987 CD release of Blue Jays)	3:37
11.	"Steppin' in a Slide Zone"	Octave (1978)	5:28
12.	"Forever Autumn (edited)"	Jeff Wayne's Musical Version of The War of the Worlds (1978)	4:31
13.	"The Voice"	Long Distance Voyager (1981)	5:14
14.	"Gemini Dream"	Long Distance Voyager (1981)	4:05
15.	"Blue World"	The Present (1983)	5:11
16.	"Your Wildest Dreams"	The Other Side of Life (1986)	4:50
17.	"I Know You're Out There Somewhere"	Sur la Mer (1988)	6:37

== Charts ==
Chart (1996)	Peak position
UK Albums (Official Charts)	13

== Certifications ==
Region	Certification	Certified units/sales
United Kingdom (BPI)	Platinum	300,000^{^}
^{^} Shipments figures based on certification alone.
