= Lovely to See You: Live =

Live album by The Moody Blues
- Released: 15 November 2005
- Recorded: 11 June 2005; At the Greek Theatre; Los Angeles, California
- Genre: Rock, progressive rock
- Length: 1:44:22
- Label: Image

The Moody Blues chronology
| Gold (2005) | Lovely to See You: Live (2005) | An Introduction to The Moody Blues (2006) |

Lovely to See You: Live is a two-disc live album by The Moody Blues. Released on 15 November 2005, Lovely to See You: Live was recorded at a performance at the Greek Theater in Los Angeles, California. The album is named after The Moody Blues song "Lovely to See You", from their 1969 album On the Threshold of a Dream. Unlike the Moody Blues' two previous live albums A Night at Red Rocks with the Colorado Symphony Orchestra and Hall of Fame, Lovely to See You: Live does not feature a live orchestra. It is also their first live album since Ray Thomas retired due to health issues.

== Track listing ==
All songs written by Justin Hayward, except where noted.

=== Disc One ===
1. "Lovely to See You" – 4:13
2. "Tuesday Afternoon (Forever Afternoon)" – 4:23
3. "Lean on Me (Tonight)" (John Lodge) – 4:44
4. "The Actor" – 5:46
5. "Steppin' in a Slide Zone" (Lodge) – 4:51
6. "The Voice" – 4:17
7. "Talking Out of Turn" (Lodge) – 5:43
8. "I Know You're Out There Somewhere" – 5:23
9. "The Story in Your Eyes" – 3:54

=== Disc Two ===
1. "Forever Autumn" (Jeff Wayne, Paul Vigrass, Gary Osborne) – 4:33
2. "Your Wildest Dreams" – 4:55
3. "Isn't Life Strange" (Lodge) – 7:48
4. "The Other Side of Life" – 5:06
5. "December Snow" – 4:45
6. "Higher and Higher" (Graeme Edge) – 5:07
7. "Are You Sitting Comfortably?" (Hayward, Ray Thomas) – 4:43
8. "I'm Just a Singer (In a Rock and Roll Band)" (Lodge) – 6:46
9. "Nights in White Satin" – 6:00
10. "Question" – 6:09
11. "Ride My See-Saw" (Lodge) – 5:12

== Personnel ==
- Justin Hayward: vocals, guitar
- John Lodge: vocals, bass, guitar
- Graeme Edge: drums, vocals

=== Additional personnel ===
- Gordon Marshall: drums
- Paul Bliss: keyboards
- Bernie Barlow: keyboards, backing vocals
- Norda Mullen: flute, guitar, backing vocals
