= Days of Future Passed Live =

Live album by The Moody Blues
- Released: 23 March 2018
- Recorded: 2017 at the Sony Centre for the Performing Arts, Toronto
- Genre: Art rock, progressive rock
- Label: Eagle
- Producer: Lindsay Brown

The Moody Blues chronology
Live at the Isle of Wight Festival 1970 (2008)	Days of Future Passed Live (2018)

Days of Future Passed Live is a live album by The Moody Blues that consists of their live performance at the Sony Centre for the Performing Arts in Toronto in 2017. The album was released on 23 March 2018.

The performance was the first time in the band's history that they had played the entire Days of Future Passed album live, and is particularly notable for the inclusion of songs written by Mike Pinder, whose material has seldom been included in the band's live sets since his 1978 departure. Justin Hayward sings his and Pinder's parts on "Dawn is a Feeling"; whereas, John Lodge sings lead on "The Sunset".

British actor Jeremy Irons takes over Pinder's narration for the bookend poems "Morning Glory" and "Late Lament". On songs written by Ray Thomas (who retired from the band in 2002), Hayward and Lodge share lead vocals on "Another Morning" while Hayward sings lead on "Twilight Time". The performance alters the album's sequence slightly, placing "Late Lament" before "Nights in White Satin".

== Track listing ==
=== Disc one ===
1. "I'm Just a Singer (In a Rock and Roll Band)"
2. "The Voice"
3. "Steppin’ in a Slide Zone"
4. "Say It With Love"
5. "Nervous"
6. "Your Wildest Dreams"
7. "Isn't Life Strange"
8. "I Know You're Out There Somewhere"
9. "The Story in Your Eyes"

=== Disc two ===
1. "The Day Begins"
2. "Morning Glory"
3. "Dawn (Prelude)"
4. Dawn is a Feeling
5. "The Morning (Prelude)"
6. "Another Morning"
7. "Lunch Break (Prelude)"
8. "Peak Hour"
9. "Tuesday Afternoon (Forever Afternoon)"
10. "Evening (Time to Get Away)"
11. "The Sunset (Prelude)"
12. "The Sunset"
13. "Twilight (Prelude)"
14. "Twilight Time"
15. "Late Lament"
16. "Nights in White Satin"
17. "The Night (Finale)"
18. "Question"
19. "Ride My See-Saw"

=== Blu-ray/DVD only ===
1. The Moody Blues Remember Days Of Future Passed

== Personnel ==
- Justin Hayward: vocals, guitars
- John Lodge: vocals, bass
- Graeme Edge: drums, percussion

== Additional personnel ==
- Norda Mullen: flute, guitars, percussion, vocals
- Alan Hewitt: keyboards, vocals
- Julie Ragins: keyboards, guitars, percussion, saxophone, vocals
- Billy Ashbaugh: drums, percussion
- Jeremy Irons: narrator
- Elliot Davis: orchestral director/arrangements
- Toronto World Festival Orchestra
