= Greatest Hits (The Moody Blues album) =

Compilation album by The Moody Blues
- Released: 21 November 1989
- Recorded: 1967–1988
- Genre: Progressive rock
- Length: 63:48
- Label: Polydor
- Producer: Tony Clarke; Pip Williams; Tony Visconti; Anne Dudley/Justin Hayward; John Lodge

The Moody Blues chronology
| Sur la Mer (1988) | Greatest Hits (1989) | Keys of the Kingdom (1991) |

Professional ratings
Review scores
| Source | Rating |
|---|---|
| AllMusic | 4.5/5 stars |

Greatest Hits is a compilation album by the progressive rock band the Moody Blues, released in 1989. The band recorded new versions of "Isn't Life Strange" and "Question" with orchestration by the London Symphony Orchestra. The arrangements were overseen by Anne Dudley, who also produced the recordings with Justin Hayward and John Lodge. In 1990, only a year after its original release, the album was re-released as The Story of the Moody Blues... Legend of a Band with different artwork to coincide with the release of the home video documentary of the same name.

== Original track listing ==
All songs written by Justin Hayward except where noted.

=== Side one ===
1. "Your Wildest Dreams" – 4:51
2. "The Voice" – 5:14
3. "Gemini Dream" (Hayward, John Lodge) – 4:06
4. "The Story in Your Eyes" – 3:03
5. "Tuesday Afternoon" – 4:41
6. "Isn't Life Strange (1988 version)" (Lodge, orch. arr. by Anne Dudley) – 6:36

=== Side two ===
1. "The Night: Nights in White Satin/Late Lament" (Hayward/Graeme Edge, Peter Knight) – 7:38
2. "I Know You're Out There Somewhere" – 6:37
3. "The Other Side of Life" – 6:49 (Not on European vinyl LP, but included on CD and Cassette format)
4. "Ride My See-Saw" (Lodge) – 3:44
5. "I'm Just a Singer" (Lodge) – 4:17
6. "Question (1988 version)" (Hayward, orch. arr. by Anne Dudley) – 5:44

== Personnel ==
=== The Moody Blues ===
- Graeme Edge – drums, percussion, maracas, backing vocals
- Justin Hayward – acoustic and electric guitars, guitar synthesiser, lead and backing vocals
- John Lodge – bass guitar, lead and backing vocals
- Patrick Moraz – keyboards, piano, Mellotron, Oberheim custom dual-manual 8-voice synthesiser, Yamaha CS80, Roland Jupiter 8, Minimoog (except on 4, 5, 7, 10 and 11)
- Mike Pinder – keyboards, piano, mellotron, Chamberlin, spoken word, gong, backing vocals (on 4, 5, 7, 10 and 11)
- Ray Thomas – flute, tambourine, backing vocals (except on 1 and 8)

=== Additional personnel ===
- Peter Knight conducting the London Festival Orchestra – orchestral arrangements on 5 and 7
- Anne Dudley, with Alexander Barantschik conducting the London Symphony Orchestra – orchestral arrangements on 6 and 12
- Frank Ricotti – additional percussion on 12

== Charts ==
Chart performance for Greatest Hits
| Chart (1989–1990) | Peak position |
|---|---|
| German Albums (Offizielle Top 100) | 65 |
| US Billboard 200 | 113 |

== Certifications ==
Certifications for Greatest Hits
| Region | Certification | Certified units/sales |
|---|---|---|
| United States (RIAA) | Gold | 500,000^{^} |
^{^} Shipments figures based on certification alone.
