= A Night at Red Rocks with the Colorado Symphony Orchestra =

Live album by The Moody Blues
- Released: 9 March 1993
- Recorded: 9 September 1992
- Venues: The Red Rocks Amphitheatre, Morrison, Colorado (west of Denver)
- Genres: Rock, progressive rock, psychedelic rock, art rock, symphonic rock, baroque pop, blues
- Length: 76:41
- Label: Polydor
- Producers: Nick Williams (co-ordination); David Aeling (orchestra); John O'Keefe (assistant)

The Moody Blues chronology
Keys of the Kingdom (1991)	A Night at Red Rocks with the Colorado Symphony Orchestra (1993)	Time Traveller (1994)

Professional ratings
Review scores
Source	Rating
AllMusic	3/5 stars

A Night at Red Rocks with the Colorado Symphony Orchestra is a live album by The Moody Blues featuring the Colorado Symphony, recorded from a live performance at the Red Rocks Amphitheatre on 9 September 1992. This performance was the first time The Moody Blues performed in concert backed by a full orchestra. The concert was held in celebration of the 25th anniversary of their second album, Days of Future Passed, which had featured the London Festival Orchestra. The full video of this concert was broadcast as a fundraising broadcast for PBS in the United States.

The original album was released on 9 March 1993 by Polydor Records, and a Concert Home Video was released shortly after. On 4 March 2003, a deluxe two-disc edition was released, which features the entire concert.

Also, in November 1999, a second video of the concert titled The Other Side of Red Rocks was released. It contained footage of the songs not on the first video release, as well as interviews and rehearsal footage.

== Original CD track listing ==
All songs by Justin Hayward except where noted.

1. "Overture" (features excerpts from "Ride My See-Saw", "Tuesday Afternoon (Forever Afternoon)", and "Nights in White Satin") (Hayward, John Lodge) – 2:58
2. "Late Lament" (Graeme Edge, Peter Knight) – 1:35
3. "Tuesday Afternoon (Forever Afternoon)" – 4:42
4. "For My Lady" (Ray Thomas) – 4:11
5. "Lean on Me (Tonight)" (Lodge) – 4:39
6. "Lovely to See You" – 4:04
7. "I Know You're Out There Somewhere" – 5:22
8. "The Voice" – 5:28
9. "Your Wildest Dreams" – 4:57
10. "Isn't Life Strange" (Lodge) – 6:44
11. "The Other Side of Life" – 7:05
12. "I'm Just a Singer (In a Rock and Roll Band)" (Lodge) – 6:55
13. "Nights in White Satin" – 6:33
14. "Question" – 6:22
15. "Ride My See-Saw" (Lodge) – 5:26

== Video track listing ==
1. "Overture" – 3:03
2. "Late Lament" – 1:21
3. "Tuesday Afternoon (Forever Afternoon)" – 4:04
4. "For My Lady" – 4:51
5. "New Horizons" – 5:06
6. "Lean on Me (Tonight)" – 4:56
7. "Lovely to See You" – 4:19
8. "Gemini Dream" – 4:20
9. "I Know You're Out There Somewhere" – 5:23
10. "The Voice" – 5:18
11. "Say It with Love" – 3:20
12. "The Story in Your Eyes" – 3:02
13. "Your Wildest Dreams" – 4:53
14. "Isn't Life Strange" – 7:20
15. "The Other Side of Life" – 6:47
16. "I'm Just a Singer (In a Rock and Roll Band)" – 6:58
17. "Nights in White Satin" – 6:49
18. "Question" – 5:29
19. "Ride My See-Saw" – 4:50

== Deluxe Edition track listing ==
The Deluxe Edition was released on 4 March 2003.

=== Disc one ===
1. "Overture" (features excerpts from "Ride My See-Saw", "New Horizons", "Another Morning", "Voices in the Sky", "(Evening) Time to Get Away", "Isn't Life Strange", "Legend of a Mind", "Tuesday Afternoon (Forever Afternoon)", and "Nights in White Satin") (Hayward, Lodge, Thomas) – 4:53
2. "Late Lament" (Edge, Knight) – 1:31
3. "Tuesday Afternoon (Forever Afternoon)" – 3:54
4. "For My Lady" (Thomas) – 4:55
5. "Bless the Wings (That Bring You Back)" – 5:19
6. "Emily's Song" (Lodge) – 4:29
7. "New Horizons" – 5:10
8. "Lean on Me (Tonight)" (Lodge) – 4:39
9. "Voices in the Sky" – 3:44
10. "Lovely to See You" – 4:26
11. "Gemini Dream" (Hayward, Lodge) – 4:45
12. "I Know You're Out There Somewhere"– 5:27
13. "The Voice" – 5:53

=== Disc two ===
1. "Say It with Love" – 4:45
2. "The Story in Your Eyes" – 3:36
3. "Your Wildest Dreams" – 4:57
4. "Isn't Life Strange" (Lodge) – 7:16
5. "The Other Side of Life" – 6:02
6. "I'm Just a Singer (In a Rock and Roll Band)" (Lodge) – 6:47
7. "Nights in White Satin" – 6:58
8. "Legend of a Mind" (Thomas) – 9:02
9. "Question" – 5:51
10. "Ride My See-Saw" (Lodge) – 5:04

== Personnel ==
- Justin Hayward – vocals, guitars
- John Lodge – vocals, bass guitar, acoustic guitar
- Ray Thomas – vocals, flutes, percussion
- Graeme Edge – drums, percussion, spoken word on "Late Lament"

=== Additional personnel ===
- Paul Bliss – keyboards
- Bias Boshell – keyboards
- June Boyce – backing vocals
- Sue Shattock – backing vocals
- Gordon Marshall – drums
- Larry Baird & The Colorado Symphony Orchestra
- Recorded by Tom Garneau in the Omega Enterprises Mobile Unit
- Mixed by Tom Garneau with Justin Hayward and John Lodge at Vancouver Sound

== Charts ==
Chart (1993)	Peak position
US Billboard 200	93

== Certifications ==
Region	Certification	Certified units/sales
United States (RIAA) audio release	Gold	500,000^{^}
United States (RIAA) VHS release	Gold	50,000^{^}
^{^} Shipments figures based on certification alone.
