= For My Lady =

1972 song by the Moody Blues

Single by The Moody Blues

from the album Seventh Sojourn
- A-side: "I'm Just a Singer (In a Rock and Roll Band)"
- Released: 19 January 1973
- Recorded: 27th July 1972
- Genre: Progressive rock
- Length: 4:01
- Label: Threshold
- Songwriter: Ray Thomas
- Producer: Tony Clarke

"For My Lady" is a song written by Ray Thomas that was released on the Moody Blues 1972 album Seventh Sojourn. It was also released as the B-side to the single "I'm Just a Singer (In a Rock and Roll Band)".

== Lyrics and music ==
The lyrics to "For My Lady" are about the singer's desire for true love. The lyrics may have been inspired by Thomas' recent divorce at the time he wrote the song.

Music journalist Geoffrey Freakes described "For My Lady" as an "uncomplicated, uncluttered and blissfully romantic song" that is "supremely elegant." Moody Blues biographer Marc Cushman felt that "the melody and heartfelt vocal performance convey a sadness despite the positive nature of the lyrics. Tampa Tribune critic Ralph Harold described the song as "an elegant love song, almost Elizabethan, although somewhat gimmicky with a cymbal sound of ocean waves and a nautical hamonica and organ background.

At one point Justin Hayward plays a guitar note that had some listeners thinking that the guitar string broke. But according to Hayward that it was not a broken string but merely an emphasized pluck to accompany the lyrics "and slowly bow her head."

== Reception ==
Rolling Stone critic Steve Ditlea described "For My Lady" as a "charming chanty about the search for love on life's sea. Star-Phoenix critic Gary Tannyan called it "the song of the album", saying that "It is a whimsical, bouncy little number that you just can't help humming along to. Camarillo Star critic Dean Hoffman called it one of the album's "brightest moments", saying it is "a delightful love song done in the manner of a sea-chanty."

Cushman felt that "For My Lady" may be Thomas' "most beautiful and enduring song" as well as "the most lovely song Thomas has written, and among his finest vocal deliveries." Classic Rock History critic Brian Kachejian rated "For My Lady" as the Moody Blues' 7th greatest song, saying that "The song’s bouncy flute opening had a very Irish ethnic storybook sound that took me someplace out to sea."

Although not released as a single a-side, "For My Lady" received a lot of airplay on the Pennsylvania radio station WSAN. One of the reasons "For My Lady" was released as the b-side of "I'm Just a Singer (In a Rock 'n' Roll Band)" was that it was one of the most frequently played tracks on radio from Seventh Sojourn.

"For My Lady" was included on several Moody Blues compilation albums, including This Is The Moody Blues in 1974 and Time Traveller in 1994.

== Live ==
The Moody Blues did not play "For My Lady" live for many years after the song was first released, likely due to the fact that Thomas sings the lead vocal and plays flute on the song, although the band could have replaced the flute with the synthesizer. They played the song live for the first time at their concert at Red Rocks Amphitheatre in Colorado in September 1992. In that show they had a complete orchestra and so the woodwinds in the orchestra could cover the flute part. The performance was released on A Night at Red Rocks with the Colorado Symphony Orchestra. After that, the band continued to perform the song live in shows that used an orchestra accompaniment until Thomas retired in 2002.

== Personnel ==
- Ray Thomas – lead vocals, flute
- Justin Hayward – acoustic guitar, backing vocals
- John Lodge – bass guitar, backing vocals
- Mike Pinder – Chamberlin, backing vocals
- Graeme Edge – drums, percussion
