= Melancholy Man =

1970 Moody Blues song

- French cover

Single by The Moody Blues

from the album A Question of Balance
- B-side: "Candle of Life" (France)
- Released: 1970
- Recorded: 3 June 1970
- Genre: Progressive Rock
- Length: 4:45 (single); 5:49 (album)
- Label: Threshold
- Songwriter(s): Mike Pinder
- Producer(s): Tony Clarke

"Melancholy Man" is a song written by Mike Pinder that was first released on the Moody Blues' 1970 album A Question of Balance. It was also released as a single in some countries, but not in the UK or US, although in the US it was later released as the b-side of "The Story in Your Eyes".

== Recording ==
"Melancholy Man" was one of the last songs to be recorded for A Question of Balance, on June 3 and 4, 1970. Producer Tony Clarke and engineer Derek Varnals used echo effects to make the song sound brittle and stark. At the first run-through of the song Varnals felt it sounded like a French film and felt this echo effect would help make the song sound like a black and white French film.

Moody Blues drummer Graeme Edge said of the song that

It was an obvious, brilliant song. It was one of those that was so complete as a song...that you had to keep it simple. You knew straightaway that you didn't need to do a lot to [it]. All you needed...was to reinforce the harmonies that were coming off the piano...without changing the chord sequences, the two different melody lines, and then the way the two melody lines intertwined. If you would have orchestrated it, it would have actually spoiled [the effect].

== Lyrics and music ==
Midder critic Will Fenton described the lyrics as "a reflection on the struggles of life, with a focus on the need for inner peace and hope in the face of adversity." Music journalist Mark Murley said of the lyrics that "the song's lyrical imagery is just mysterious and indefinite enough to invite speculation over its meaning. In 1996 Pinder said of the lyrics that:

The single most incorrect interpretation of "Melancholy Man" had been that maybe it was a song about me being melancholy. I used that as a way of saying that there are different levels of melancholy, and that this was a melancholy for the whole world, because of the impending breakdown of the structure in all things that we have seen happen since the song came out, 26 years ago. What we're seeing now is just more results of what was being done then, and what continues to be done by the industrial giants and governments of the world, and the greedy little cigar-smoking guys like on the album cover.

Pinder sings the lead vocal and according to music journalist Geoffrey Freakes he sounds more vulnerable than on any previous song. The rest of the band provides backing vocals and, according to Freakes, "the counterpoint harmonies towards the end are sublime." Pinder plays both acoustic guitar and Moog synthesizer, Justin Hayward also plays acoustic guitar and adds a lead guitar break, John Lodge plays bass guitar and Graeme Edge plays drums. Pinder's and Hayward's acoustic guitars were each overdubbed twice.

== Reception ==
"Melancholy Man" was particularly popular in France, where it was released as a single and reached #1. According to Clarke the song was played particularly frequently upon the death of Charles de Gaulle.

Although not released as a single in the US, it became the #3 song in Terre Haute, Indiana on 22 November 1970, behind just "Cry Me a River" by Joe Crocker and "Gypsy Woman" by Brian Hyland. Minneapolis Star critic Charles Quimby said the song "typifies both the reach and the limits of the band." Quimby called the song "almost pastoral, a multi-colored dance of slow falling leaves at hurricane volume. And somehow very, very melancholy." Hattiesburg American critic Bruce Garrison called the song "tremendous," saying that "the vocalization and mood set are almost mind-shattering."

In the UK, New Musical Express critic Richard Green said:

Great song, perhaps my favorite on the album. A couple of acoustic guitars open it up before Mike Pinder's distinctive voice takes over at a slow pace with a chorus behind and a plodding drum beat comes in. I've rarely heard instruments used so well to relay the theme of a song; they're quite faultless. Pathos and woe spreads all over the place and I don't recommend listening to it after you've had a row with your loved one.

Fenton rated "Melancholy Man" as the Moody Blues' 13th greatest song, calling it "a gentle, mid-tempo ballad, featuring a prominent organ and a melodic electric guitar solo" and a "melancholic and soulful song."

"Melancholy Man" has been included on several Moody Blues compilation albums, including This Is The Moody Blues, Time Traveller, Anthology and Gold.

== Live performances ==
The Moody Blues retained "Melancholy Man" in their live concert set list through 1974. A live version from the Isle of Wight in 1970 was included on the live album Live at the Isle of Wight Festival 1970. Freakes found this version to be "especially powerful with raw emotion."
