= Keys of the Kingdom =

Studio album by the Moody Blues
- Released: 1 July 1991
- Recorded: October 1990 – May 1991
- Studios: Olympic, Mayfair, The Hit Factory and RG Jones, London, UK
- Genre: Rock
- Length: 53:02
- Labels: Polydor (US); Threshold (UK)
- Producers: Christopher Neil; Alan Tarney; Tony Visconti

The Moody Blues chronology
Greatest Hits (1989)	Keys of the Kingdom (1991)	A Night at Red Rocks with the Colorado Symphony Orchestra (1993)

Singles from Keys of the Kingdom
- 1. "Say It with Love" Released: June 1991; 2. "Bless the Wings (That Bring You Back)" Released: August 1991

Professional ratings
Review scores
Source	Rating
AllMusic	2/5 stars
Chicago Tribune	3/4 stars
Entertainment Weekly	C−

Keys of the Kingdom is the fourteenth album by the rock band the Moody Blues, released in 1991. Although some of the tracks recall the songwriting on Sur la Mer, the failure of Keys of the Kingdom to produce any major hit singles would mark the beginning of the Moodies' decline in popularity with mainstream audiences after their success in the MTV video generation.

The album saw the band beginning to return to a more airy rock oriented sound (similar to The Present), rather than the previous two albums' forays into synthesiser pop. Flautist Ray Thomas plays more of a substantial role on this record, with his first ambient flute piece in eight years. It was recorded and mixed at four London studios: Olympic Studios, RG Jones Recording Studios, Mayfair Studios and The Hit Factory (not to be confused with the NYC-based studio of the same name). Drum machines are still used heavily; Graeme Edge only performs on three songs, with session drummer Andy Duncan providing live drums on two more, and the rest being programmed.

Keyboardist Patrick Moraz was fired from the band after completing only a few tracks for this album, and he is listed as an 'additional' keyboard player. After a lawsuit (broadcast by Court TV) filed by Moraz, their future album and re-release booklets would distance themselves from Moraz – e.g. removing him from photographs that originally featured him - and they never had any future keyboardists become official members of the band.

This was the last Moody Blues album before their extravagant concert at Red Rocks and a series of symphonic tours with orchestras.

== Original track listing ==
=== Side one ===
1. "Say It with Love" (Justin Hayward) – 3:57
2. "Bless the Wings (That Bring You Back)" (Hayward) – 5:10
3. "Is This Heaven?" (Hayward, John Lodge) – 4:04
4. "Say What You Mean (Parts 1 & 2)" (Hayward) – 5:31
5. "Lean on Me (Tonight)" (Lodge) – 4:58

=== Side two ===
1. "Hope and Pray" (Hayward) – 5:03
2. "Shadows on the Wall" (Lodge) – 5:07
3. "Once is Enough" (Hayward, Lodge) (Not put on vinyl LP (Europe only) or cassette, but included on CD format and 7-inch single) – 4:03
4. "Celtic Sonant" (Ray Thomas) – 5:02
5. "Magic" (Lodge) – 5:11
6. "Never Blame the Rainbows for the Rain" (Hayward, Thomas) – 4:57

== Personnel ==
- Justin Hayward – vocals, guitars
- John Lodge – vocals, bass guitar
- Ray Thomas – vocals, flute
- Graeme Edge – drums on "Bless the Wings", "Shadows on the Wall" and "Once Is Enough"; percussion

=== Additional personnel ===
- Patrick Moraz – keyboards on "Say What You Mean", "Celtic Sonant" and "Magic"
- Bias Boshell – keyboards, drum machine
- Paul Bliss – keyboards, drum machine
- Andy Duncan – drums on "Is This Heaven?" and "Magic"
- Nigel Hitchcock – alto saxophone
- Jamie Talbot – tenor saxophone
- Pete Beachill – trombone
- Guy Barker – trumpet

== Charts ==
Chart (1991)	Peak position
Canada Top Albums/CDs (RPM)	29
Dutch Albums (Album Top 100)	67
UK Albums (Official Charts)	54
US Billboard 200	94
