= Seventh Sojourn =

Studio album by the Moody Blues
- Released: 23 October 1972
- Recorded: January–September 1972
- Studios: Decca Studios, London
- Genres: Progressive rock; psychedelic rock
- Length: 39:29
- Label: Threshold
- Producer: Tony Clarke

The Moody Blues chronology
Every Good Boy Deserves Favour (1971)	Seventh Sojourn (1972)	This Is The Moody Blues (1974)

Singles from Seventh Sojourn
- 1. "Isn't Life Strange" Released: April 1972; 2. "I'm Just a Singer (In a Rock and Roll Band)" Released: January 1973; 3. "For My Lady" Released: January 1973; 4. "You And Me" Released: 1973

Seventh Sojourn is the eighth album by the Moody Blues, released in October 1972. The album reached No. 5 in the United Kingdom and became the band's first American chart-topper, spending five weeks at No. 1 there to close out 1972.

== Background ==
The album is a collection of songs without a conceptual theme, continuing the style of its predecessor, Every Good Boy Deserves Favour. According to John Lodge, "The album was very loosely based on the idea of The Canterbury Tales by Chaucer… we told stories, but musically."

The sessions were an unhappy time for the group. Sojourn would prove to be the group's last album together until 1978's Octave. Drummer Graeme Edge remembers: "At the time of recording Seventh Sojourn, it was my least favourite album. But years later, after coming to it with fresh ears and away from all of the pressures of that time, I realised that it was really rather good!"

Though it's overall the eighth Moody Blues album, Seventh Sojourn is the seventh album featuring this specific line-up of musicians. The first Moody Blues LP, The Magnificent Moodies, featured a substantially different line-up and sound compared to the group's subsequent work.

== Writing ==
Guitarist Justin Hayward recalls the inspiration behind Mike Pinder's socially conscious "Lost in a Lost World": "I think at the time, we were doing so much, so many universities and student functions, and that was our audience. I think we were just reflecting what was going on around us. [...] we were only reflecting the general conversation of young people at the time. For me, I was 21 or 22 years old, and we were reflecting a lot of that. We were lucky enough in Great Britain that what they called conscription finished, but of course so many of our friends in the U.S. were being drafted. It was a very disturbing time for young people."

Hayward's "New Horizons" was inspired by loss. He explains, "It was at a really tough time in my life. I’d not long lost my father. There was quite a lot of death around me, and I was having to cope with that and work out how you handle that and what you do and how you can get through it. It’s very poignant to me."

Ray Thomas recalls writing his longing love song "For My Lady": "That was really just after my divorce. Basically I'm saying I'd give my life for a gentle lady."

Lodge remembers the inspiration for "Isn't Life Strange": "That song wrote itself, strangely enough. I was with my wife, and a couple of friends, and I have a baby grand piano in my drawing room in my house in England. We were having dinner and I could hear this tune in my head and I excused myself. I went over to the piano and, basically, I wrote the whole song, then and there. It only had one lyric at that time, 'Isn't life strange.' I wrote the music right then and there. I remember going to bed and wondering, 'I wonder if I have written that song, or if it was something else? In the morning I am going to go downstairs and play it and see if it stands up.' It did. That next day I sat down and wrote all of the lyrics. The other thing, which is really interesting about that, and shows how things have changed, is that we did all of our vocals on that song on a Friday night, out of necessity, as we were leaving for a tour of America. We landed in New York and we took the tapes to London Records on a Saturday in New York and it was released as a single the following Friday. That was a different time then. It is unheard of today. It moved fast and it was so unbelievable."

Pinder's "When You're a Free Man" is addressed to Timothy Leary, who befriended the band after the release of their song "Legend of a Mind". At the time, Leary was imprisoned on a marijuana charge. In a later interview, Pinder defends Leary: ""He's a tremendous humanitarian with a tremendous capacity to bring people together. He's magnetic and he attracts negative energy as well as positive."

Lodge wrote "I'm Just a Singer (In a Rock and Roll Band)" as a response to fans who mistakenly read guru-like wisdom into the group's lyrics. He recounts one particular event that inspired the song: "Somehow, some of our fans attributed us with having the answer to the universe. I remember coming home from a tour of the US and when I got to my house I saw all these people camping out in the front yard. I asked what they were doing and they said, 'We've been told you're going to fly the spaceship that's going to save us all.' I actually don't like flying! I respected that young people at that time were looking for answers but like I said in the song, 'If you want the wind of change to blow about you/And you're the only other person to know, don't tell me/I'm just a singer in a rock and roll band.'"

== Recording ==
Initial sessions took place at Mike Pinder's home studio built in the garage of his home "Beckthorns" in January 1972. Hayward reflects on the setting and the band's difficulty adjusting to their commercial success: "It was a ludicrous situation; we could afford to record anywhere in the world, and there we were in our keyboard player's garage. We were so frightened of failure that we just tried to make ourselves smaller and smaller." The group soon moved to one of Decca's proper recording studios. Work on the album continued from February through September at Decca Studio 4 on Tollington Park in North London.

The album is notable for Mike Pinder's use of a new keyboard instrument, the Chamberlin, alongside his familiar Mellotron. Hayward discussed the instrument's advantages: "We'd found a great replacement for the Mellotron, an American instrument called the Chamberlin. It worked on the same principle as the Mellotron, but had much better quality sounds – great brass, strings and cello and so on. With the Mellotron you had to overdub and overlay it, adding echo to get it to sound nice. The Chamberlin was a louder instrument and had a much better sound quality."

Each of the band members recall the sessions being an unhappy time for the group. According to Hayward, "The album took a long time to make and I found it a painful experience. It became obvious to me that the five of us wouldn't make another album. We didn't argue, it was just an unhappy time. No one was really enjoying the creative process and it was a struggle to get things done." Graeme Edge adds, "It was a strained and awkward period for us. Mike Pinder, particularly, found it difficult. We were all exhausted and had become prisoners of our own success." Thomas remembers, "By the time we began the sessions I think we needed a break from each other. Up to that time everywhere one of us went the others would be there too. All my experiences were their experiences." Lodge continues, "Unwittingly, we'd called time on ourselves via the title Seventh Sojourn. According to the bible, 'thou shalt rest' on the seventh day. The word "sojourn" means to call a halt. We needed to escape from our cocoon and get out and meet ordinary people once more to return our lives to something more recognisable as normality."

The band made one more attempt to record an album in 1973, without success. That year, they embarked on a highly successful but fatiguing world tour. Lodge remembers, "By then we were subject to lateral pressures which we'd brought on ourselves that were outside of music. On our 1973 tour we had our own Boeing 707 aircraft which was decked out with a sitting room and a fireplace. There were two bedrooms, some twenty individual TV's, sound systems everywhere and we had our own butler and our name written on the outside of the plane. I had a very empty feeling knowing that things had got this excessive." He continues, "By 1974, we had touring companies, we had our own record company, we had offices, a string of record shop stores we had across the south of England. We had forgotten the most basic thing, we stopped talking to each other! We shared all the same emotions and experiences together, we really didn't have anything to say to each other. We said, let's take a break and get rid of the clutter. We did! We waited until the time was right to get back together then we put out Octave."

== Album cover ==
The album is the group's last to feature artwork by longtime collaborator Phil Travers. He remembers the process of designing the cover featuring a surrealistic landscape: "It is impossible for me to tell how long it took me to produce the illustrations other than to say that, in most cases, I had days rather than weeks to complete them and submit them for approval. At the first meeting we would listen to the soundtrack together and discuss the themes and ideas behind the album. It was then left to me to produce a pencil rough which was then discussed further. Eventually a consensus would be reached and the painting would begin in earnest. Time always was of the essence, and many times I was working all day and all night to meet the printer’s deadline. But I have to say it was greatly fulfilling and I thoroughly enjoyed it. As for the way I painted, I used Gouache and some watercolor, and very often I employed an airbrush."

== Release ==
In April 2007 the album was remastered into SACD format and repackaged with four extra tracks. "Island", the fourth bonus track, is an unfinished recording from 1973, made during the brief sessions for a follow-up album that never happened.

In 2008, a remaster for standard audio CD was issued with the same bonus tracks.

== Reception ==
Professional ratings
Review scores
Source	Rating
AllMusic	3.5/5 stars
Rolling Stone	(favorable)
Uncut	2/5 stars

Two hit singles came from this album: "Isn't Life Strange" (No. 13 UK, No. 29 US) and "I'm Just a Singer (In a Rock and Roll Band)" (No. 36 UK, No. 12 US). However, both songs were overshadowed by the re-release of "Nights in White Satin", which had been first released in 1967. Whereas both singles from Seventh Sojourn made the top 40, "Nights In White Satin" bested both, hitting No. 9 in the UK and No. 2 in the United States and gaining the highest American chart position for a Moody Blues single.

Record World rated "I'm Just a Singer" and "Land of Make-Believe" as "dynamite cuts".

Classic Rock History critic Brian Kachejian rated three songs from Seventh Sojourn as being among the Moody Blues' 10 best – "New Horizons", "Lost in a Lost World" and "For My Lady".

== Track listing ==
Side one
No.	Title	Writer(s)	Lead vocals	Length
1.	"Lost in a Lost World"	Mike Pinder	Pinder	4:42
2.	"New Horizons"	Justin Hayward	Hayward	5:11
3.	"For My Lady"	Ray Thomas	Thomas	3:58
4.	"Isn't Life Strange"	John Lodge	Lodge, Hayward	6:09

Side two
No.	Title	Writer(s)	Lead vocals	Length
5.	"You and Me"	Hayward, Graeme Edge	Hayward, Thomas, Pinder	4:21
6.	"The Land of Make-Believe"	Hayward	Hayward	4:52
7.	"When You're a Free Man"	Pinder	Pinder	6:06
8.	"I'm Just a Singer (In a Rock and Roll Band)"	Lodge	Lodge	4:18
Total length:				39:29

2007 SACD expanded edition and 2008 remaster bonus tracks
No.	Title	Writer(s)	Length
9.	"Isn't Life Strange" (original version)	Lodge	8:10
10.	"You and Me" (Beckthorns backing track)	Hayward, Edge	6:33
11.	"Lost in a Lost World" (instrumental demo)	Pinder	4:41
12.	"Island" (previously unreleased)	Hayward	4:30

== Personnel ==
- Justin Hayward ― vocals, guitars
- John Lodge ― vocals, bass, cello, acoustic guitar
- Ray Thomas ― vocals, flute, tambourine, saxophone, oboe
- Graeme Edge ― drums, percussion, vocals
- Mike Pinder ― vocals, Chamberlin, piano, harmonium, cello

== Production ==
Sources:

- Producer Tony Clarke
- Recording engineers - Derek Varnals and Tony Clarke ("Isn't Life Strange")
- Assistant engineer - David Baker
- Cover and liner art - Phil Travers
- Inner sleeve - The Moodies
- All instruments played by The Moody Blues
- Recorded at Tollington Park Studios, London

== Charts ==
Chart (1972–1973)	Peak position
Australian Albums (Kent Music Report)	2
Canada Top Albums/CDs (RPM)	1
Danish Albums (Hitlisten)	4
Dutch Albums (Album Top 100)	7
Finnish Albums (The Official Finnish Charts)	6
German Albums (Offizielle Top 100)	38
Italian Albums (Musica e Dischi)	6
Norwegian Albums (VG-lista)	10
UK Albums (Official Charts)	5
US Billboard 200	1

Chart (2025)	Peak position
Greek Albums (IFPI)	53

== Certifications ==
Region	Certification	Certified units/sales
Canada (Music Canada)	Platinum	100,000^{^}
United States (RIAA)	Gold	500,000^{^}
^{^} Shipments figures based on certification alone.
