= Question (The Moody Blues song) =

Single by The Moody Blues

from the album A Question of Balance
- B-side: "Candle of Life"
- Released: 24 April 1970; 21 November 1989 (Greatest Hits version)
- Recorded: 24 January 1970; 1988 (Greatest Hits version)
- Genre: Progressive rock
- Length: 5:44 (Album version); 4:55 (Single version); 5:45 (Greatest Hits version)
- Label: Threshold
- Songwriter: Justin Hayward
- Producers: Tony Clarke (Original version); Anne Dudley, Justin Hayward, and John Lodge (Greatest Hits version)

The Moody Blues singles chronology
| "Watching and Waiting" (1969) | "Question" (1970) | "The Story in Your Eyes" (1971) |

"Question" is a 1970 single by the English progressive rock band the Moody Blues. It was written by guitarist Justin Hayward, who provides lead vocals. "Question" was first released as a single in April 1970 and remains their second highest-charting song in the UK, reaching number two and staying on the chart for 12 weeks. The song reached number 21 on the Billboard Top 40 in the USA. It was later featured as the lead track on the 1970 album A Question of Balance. The single also features the song "Candle of Life" on its B-side, which was from the Moody Blues' previous album To Our Children's Children's Children.

Hayward pieced the song together from two unfinished songs, which accounts for the change of pace in the middle of the song. Hayward said that:

Sometime before we taped the album, we [documented] "Question", which was a song that I didn't have on Friday night for a [recording] session [the following] Saturday. But, by the morning, I had it and it was recorded very quickly.

Hayward also said:

It was written at a time when we were touring America, and a lot of young people of our generation were living in fear of being called up into a terrible conflict [the Vietnam War], so I think we were speaking for them in a way. When I wrote it, I knew what the bass line was going to be and what it needed from the drums, and fortunately I had Graeme [Edge], who could do that on the high hat. He was well up for doing that beat. And it was great — we didn't do many takes. There's no real double tracking on 'Question.' It was one of those things where we got back to basics. The Question of Balance album had that philosophy, to get back to basics and a simple way of recording.

"Question" is one of the Moody Blues' most popular songs, and has been included in virtually all of their compilations and live albums. In addition, the song was re-recorded (along with "Isn't Life Strange") in the studio with the London Symphony Orchestra (who in 1978 had released an orchestral cover of the song) in 1988, for the Greatest Hits album.

Cash Box described the song as starting "with a guitar intro in The Who manner" that "[churns] up instant listener interest from the start" and then "alters midway to become a brilliantly presented ballad in the [Moody Blues'] own tradition."

Ultimate Classic Rock critic Nick DeRiso rated it as the Moody Blues' greatest song, saying that the merging of two unfinished songs "achieve[d] this perfectly calibrated sense of emotional turbulence." Classic Rock critic Malcolm Dome rated it as the Moody Blues' 3rd greatest song, saying that it "offers a powerful message that still retains an ability to emotionally move you."

Classic Rock History critic Brian Kachejian rated it as the Moody Blues' 5th greatest song, saying that it "featured one of the greatest acoustic guitar openings of any classic rock track in history" and that the "killer vocal" and "the dynamic time change in the middle of the track" add to its status. Kachejian also noted that Graeme Edge's drum fill after the line "Why do we never get an answer when there’s knocking at the door" "catapulted the song into classic rock history."

== Personnel ==
- Justin Hayward – 12-string acoustic guitar, lead vocals
- John Lodge – bass guitar, backing vocals
- Mike Pinder – Mellotron, tambourine, backing vocals (1970 recording)
- Ray Thomas – backing vocals
- Graeme Edge – drums, percussion
- Patrick Moraz – keyboards (1988 recording)
- Frank Ricotti – additional percussion (1988 recording)

== Charts ==
| Chart (1970) | Peak position |
|---|---|
| Belgium (Ultratop 50 Flanders) | 9 |
| Belgium (Ultratop 50 Wallonia) | 25 |
| Canada (RPM) | 8 |
| Germany (GfK) | 9 |
| Ireland (IRMA) | 1 |
| Netherlands (Single Top 100) | 1 |
| New Zealand (Listener Chart) | 7 |
| UK Singles (OCC) | 2 |
| US Billboard Hot 100 | 21 |
