= The Story in Your Eyes =

Single by The Moody Blues

from the album Every Good Boy Deserves Favour
- B-side: "My Song" (Netherlands); "Melancholy Man" (US)
- Released: 27 August 1971
- Recorded: 4 November 1970
- Genre: Progressive rock, blues rock, hard rock
- Length: 2:57 (album version); 3:07 (single version)
- Label: Threshold
- Songwriter(s): Justin Hayward
- Producer(s): Tony Clarke

The Moody Blues singles chronology
"Question" (1970)	"The Story in Your Eyes" (1971)	"Isn't Life Strange" (1972)

Official audio "The Story In Your Eyes" on YouTube

"The Story in Your Eyes" is a 1971 hit single by the English rock band the Moody Blues. Written by the band's guitarist Justin Hayward, it was first released as a single with "My Song" on the B-side, and then on the 1971 album Every Good Boy Deserves Favour shortly after.

== Background ==
"The Story in Your Eyes" was the Moody Blues' last single to feature the Mellotron as it would be supplanted by the Chamberlin, a similar instrument, in time for their next album, Seventh Sojourn. The SACD release of the album Every Good Boy Deserves Favour contains a version of "The Story in Your Eyes" that has the Mellotron in a more dominant role.

Allmusic critic Lindsay Planer described it as "one of the Moody Blues’ edgier pieces" with "decidedly probing observational lyrics." Cashbox described it as a "scorching rocker" that is "certain to make quite an impact in underground and pop markets." Record World said it was a "top-notch" song "in [the band's] big production rock and roll tradition."

Classic Rock History critic Brian Kachejian rated it as the Moody Blues' 2nd greatest song, saying that "The song’s classic opening guitar lick is easily one of the most recognizable in classic rock history" and praising the vocal performances, the lead guitar playing and the Mellotron playing. Ultimate Classic Rock critic Nick DeRiso rated it as the Moody Blues' 3rd greatest song.

The main riff of the song resembles the later section of "MacArthur Park," by Jimmy Webb, an international hit single for Richard Harris in 1968. Hayward covered "MacArthur Park" on his 1989 solo album, Classic Blue.

== Personnel ==
- Justin Hayward – double-tracked vocals, acoustic and electric guitar
- John Lodge – bass guitar, backing vocals
- Mike Pinder – Mellotron, piano, backing vocals
- Ray Thomas – tambourine, backing vocals
- Graeme Edge – drums, percussion

== Chart positions ==
Year	Chart	Position
1971	Canada RPM	7
1971	Billboard Hot 100	23

== Cover versions ==
- Stiv Bators released the song as a single in 1987 on Bomp! Records, backed with "Have Love, Will Travel". It is included on Bators' retrospective CD L.A. L.A..
- Fountains of Wayne recorded a cover version of the song for their 2011 album Sky Full of Holes. It was available only as an Amazon.com MP3 bonus track.
