= Isn't Life Strange =

1972 single by the Moody Blues

Single by The Moody Blues

from the album Seventh Sojourn
- B-side: "After You Came"
- Released: 21 April 1972; 21 November 1989 (Greatest Hits version)
- Recorded: 14 February 1972; 1988 (Greatest Hits version)
- Genre: Progressive rock
- Length: 6:10 (Album/main version); 4:25 (Promo version); 5:32 (Compilation edited version); 6:41 (Greatest Hits version); 8:10 (2007 SACD/2008 remastered versions)
- Label: Threshold
- Songwriter: John Lodge
- Producers: Tony Clarke (Original version); Anne Dudley, Justin Hayward; John Lodge (Greatest Hits version)

The Moody Blues singles chronology
"The Story in Your Eyes" (1971)	"Isn't Life Strange" (1972)	"I'm Just a Singer (In a Rock and Roll Band)" (1973)

Official audio"Isn't Life Strange" on YouTube

"Isn't Life Strange" is a 1972 single by the English progressive rock band the Moody Blues. Written by bassist John Lodge, it was the first of two singles released from their 1972 album Seventh Sojourn, with the other being "I'm Just a Singer (In a Rock and Roll Band)", also written by Lodge.

== Music and lyrics ==
"Isn't Life Strange" is one of the Moody Blues' longer songs, lasting for over six minutes. Its melody was based on Pachelbel's Canon In D. The song begins with instrumentation on flute and harmonium, a combination that Classic Rock critic Malcolm Dome described as "haunting". Dome described the lyrics as being about "how life seems a habit of throwing up surprises."

== Reception ==
Cash Box described it as "symphonic rock extraordinaire", and also said that it had a "strangely intriguing, euphoric production that stands out in any crowd." Record World said that "lush orchestration and Bee Gees-like harmonies are the notable features" of the song, which also has a "pretty melody and production." Writing for Rock Cellar magazine, Frank Mastropolo rated the song as number 1 in a list of "Top 11 Question Songs". Dome rated it as the Moody Blues' 4th greatest song. PopMatters critic Sean Murphy rated "Isn't Life Strange" as the 67th best progressive rock song of all time.

== Long version ==
The 2007 SACD expanded edition and 2008 remaster of Seventh Sojourn both include an 8:10 version of the song as a bonus track. This is the original version of the song that the shorter album version was edited down from. The longer version has an instrumental midsection featuring flute and keyboards, as well as a brief piano lead-in and a longer fadeout.

== Personnel ==
Original version

- John Lodge – bass guitar, possible acoustic guitar, vocals
- Justin Hayward – electric guitar, vocals
- Mike Pinder – Chamberlin, harmonium, backing vocals
- Ray Thomas – flute, backing vocals
- Graeme Edge – drums, percussion

== Chart positions ==
Chart performance for "Isn't Life Strange"
Chart (1972)	Peak position
Australia (Kent Music Report)	39
Canada Top Singles (RPM)	9
UK Singles (Official Charts)	13
US Billboard Hot 100	29
