= I'm Just a Singer (In a Rock and Roll Band) =

1973 single by the Moody Blues

Single by the Moody Blues

from the album Seventh Sojourn
- B-side: "For My Lady"
- Released: 19 January 1973
- Recorded: 3 August 1972
- Genre: Progressive rock
- Length: 4:18
- Label: Threshold
- Songwriter: John Lodge
- Producer: Tony Clarke

The Moody Blues singles chronology
"Isn't Life Strange" (1972)	"I'm Just a Singer (In a Rock and Roll Band)" (1973)	"Steppin' in a Slide Zone" (1978)

Official video
- "I'm Just a Singer (In a Rock and Roll Band)" on YouTube

"I'm Just a Singer (In a Rock and Roll Band)" is a 1973 hit single by the English progressive rock band the Moody Blues, written by the band's bassist, John Lodge. It was first released in 1972 as the final track on the album Seventh Sojourn and was later released as a single in 1973, with "For My Lady" as its B-side. It was the second single released from Seventh Sojourn, with the first being "Isn't Life Strange", which was also written by Lodge.

The song reached number 12 on the Billboard Hot 100 in the US, becoming one of their highest-charting hits in that country, but fared less well in their native UK, where it managed number 36. It was also the final single released by the Moody Blues prior to their five-year hiatus, which was agreed upon so each of the band members could pursue their own solo careers. Their next single would not be until 1978, with "Steppin' in a Slide Zone".

The lyrics suggest that music can unite people but says that people should not look to musicians for answers to their problems. Music critic Maury Dean said that the song "combined a Byrds or Neil Young flavor with Jazz vocalics (complex chords) and a kicky, jiffy beat."

Billboard regarded the song as a change of pace for the Moody Blues, stating that it had a more "upbeat rock sound" than their typical songs. Cash Box predicted that it was "likely to turn gold," saying that "all indications are that it will head straight for the very top" of the charts. Record World called it an "uptempo rocker" that will give the group "a lock on the top of the charts."

Classic Rock critic Malcolm Dome rated it as the Moody Blues' 6th greatest song, calling it "a high energy, driving song which begins with a strolling drum intro from Graeme Edge." AllMusic critic Lindsay Planer said that "Even though this is an uptempo rocker, Lodge delves headlong into an introspective space equal to that of another significant side, 'Isn't Life Strange.'"

The song was the last of the band's singles to feature the Mellotron. A promotional music-video was filmed for "I'm Just a Singer (In a Rock and Roll Band)". This video showed the band's flautist Ray Thomas playing a baritone saxophone; however, according to keyboardist Mike Pinder, the saxophone was used just for effect in the video and the saxophone sound was produced by the Chamberlin. The basic tracks for the song were recorded in Pinder's garage, producing a raw sound.

The song remained in the Moody Blues' live concerts throughout their career. Live performances of the song during the band's final years featured a live saxophone played by keyboardist Julie Ragins, along with Norda Mullen on flute.

== Personnel ==
- John Lodge – lead vocals, bass guitar
- Justin Hayward – vocals, acoustic and electric guitars
- Mike Pinder – vocals, Mellotron, piano, tambourine
- Ray Thomas – vocals
- Graeme Edge – drums, percussion

== Chart history ==
=== Weekly charts ===
Weekly chart performance for "I'm Just a Singer (In a Rock and Roll Band)"
Chart (1973)	Peak position
Australia (Kent Music Report)	39
Canada RPM Top Singles	16
Netherlands (Single Top 100)	4
UK Singles Chart	36
US Billboard Hot 100	12
US Cash Box Top 100	8

=== Year-end charts ===
Year-end chart performance for "I'm Just a Singer (In a Rock and Roll Band)"
Chart (1973)	Rank
Canada	172
Netherlands	53
US (Joel Whitburn's Pop Annual)	106
