= The Thoughts of Emerlist Davjack =

- O'List, Davison, Jackson, Emerson

Studio album by The Nice
- Released: 1 March 1968
- Recorded: October–November 1967
- Studios: Olympic and Pye Studios
- Genre: Psychedelic rock
- Length: 37:50
- Label: Immediate
- Producer: Emerlist Davjack

The Nice chronology
| The Thoughts of Emerlist Davjack (1968) | Ars Longa Vita Brevis (1968) |

The Thoughts of Emerlist Davjack is the 1968 debut album by English psychedelic and progressive rock band the Nice.

== Background ==
Originally formed in the spring of 1967 as the live backing group to soul singer P. P. Arnold, the Nice quickly established an identity of their own. By late August, they had split from Arnold and were receiving rave reviews for their live performances, which secured them a residency at The Marquee. Andrew Loog Oldham approached the group soon after and signed them to Immediate Records, where they were ushered into Olympic Studios that fall with Oldham's insistence that they only record original material. According to guitarist David O'List, Mick Jagger was originally planned to produce the album but was unable to do so, leaving the band to produce it themselves under the alias "Emerlist Davjack." Jagger did, however, produce several sessions for P.P. Arnold's 1967 debut album which featured The Nice on backing, including the songs "Am I Still Dreaming?", "Though It Hurts Me Badly" and "Treat Me Like a Lady."

== Style ==
The album was primarily composed of psychedelic pop typical of the period ("Flower King of Flies"," Tantalising Maggie", "The Cry of Eugene"), with Keith Emerson contributing layers of keyboards (piano, organ, harpsichord) and occasionally adding in quotes from well-known classical pieces. There are also two lengthy acid-rock instrumental jams, "Rondo" and "War and Peace", which point in the group's future progressive rock direction; on these, Emerson incorporates glissandos, feedback, and pitch-bending into his Hammond organ solos as he did on stage, along with an innovative patchwork quilt of blues, jazz and classical motifs. Unlike later Nice albums, the presence of Davy O'List exhibited a substantial electric guitar presence as well, heavily influenced by Jimi Hendrix.

== Songs and recording ==
At the 1967 Windsor Jazz & Blues Festival, Lee Jackson claimed the song "Flower King of Flies" was about Paul McCartney. "The Thoughts of Emerlist Davjack" was used as incidental music for the 1968 children's television drama The Tyrant King; the 6-part series also featured music by the Rolling Stones, the Moody Blues and Pink Floyd. The title track was released as the album's lead single in November 1967, along with the non-LP B-side "Azrial (Angel of Death)"; while it received positive reviews from the Daily Mail, Melody Maker and Record Mirror, it failed to chart. Because the group lacked a strong lead vocalist, they frequently used echo and filter effects on their vocals, such as on "Tantalising Maggie", while the heavily psychedelic "Dawn" features an eerie whispered vocal from Jackson against extensive stereo panning of both guitar and organ feedback. The final lines in "Dawn", "Dawn is pregnant with promise and anticipation / But is murdered by the hand of the inevitable", would be reused at the close of the group's hit cover of "America."

"Rondo" is based around an extended quote and reharmonization of the Dave Brubeck Quartet's "Blue Rondo à la Turk", adapted from 9/8 to 4/4 time, while the organ solo includes a short excerpt from Johann Sebastian Bach's Toccata & Fugue in D Minor. "War and Peace", based around the riff of Big John Patton's "Silver Meter", also contains a quote from Bach's Brandenburg Concerto No. 3 in G Major, which would be more fully developed on the following album's "Brandenburger". In addition, the close of "Tantalising Maggie" features a quote from Carl Philipp Emanuel Bach's "Solfeggio in C minor."

"The Cry of Eugene", which was later re-recorded by Jackson's group Jackson Heights, references "Harlequin & Columbine" from Hans Christian Andersen's collection of short stories What the Moon Saw. The track also features trumpet work from guitarist Davy O'List; this would be the only Nice album to feature O'List.

Recording sessions for the album began at Olympic Studios in October 1967, with an article in the October 21 issue of Disc and Music Echo listing "Flower King of Flies", "Going Back" (O'List's original title for "The Thoughts of Emerlist Davjack"), "Azrial" and "Dawn" as having been recently completed. Engineering duties were undertaken by Glyn Johns, who contributed echo effects to "Flower King of Flies", also sung by O'List. The group's first BBC session on the 22nd saw the band additionally record "Rondo", "Tantalising Maggie" and a cover of "Sombrero Sam" (a staple of their live set at the time which would not make the album). After further sessions at Olympic plus additional sessions at Pye, the album was finished shortly after the completion of the group's package tour with Jimi Hendrix, Pink Floyd and The Move that November.

== Title and album cover ==
The name 'Emerlist Davjack' is a portmanteau created by combining the last names of the four members of the group; Keith Emerson, David O'List, Brian Davison and Lee Jackson. The original disc credits all compositions to 'Emerlist Davjack'; later releases give more specific credits. The first half of the title ("the thoughts of") is apparently a reference to bassist Lee Jackson's habit of carrying a copy of Mao Zedong's Little Red Book, an alternate name of which was "The Thoughts of Chairman Mao."

The cover, photographed by Gered Mankowitz at a Soho studio, shows members of the band shirtless and wrapped in cellophane, having just burst out of a cellophane "embryo" meant to represent a new birth in the reinvention of music. According to Emerson, the back cover features a slide of the band projected onto a woman's naked body, specifically the pubic mound; initially they tried projecting onto the breasts, but Emerson complained that the result comedically distorted his face.

== Release and reception ==
Professional ratings
Review scores
| Source | Rating |
|---|---|
| AllMusic | 2/5 stars |
| Melody Maker | (positive) |

The album was released in March 1968 in mono and stereo editions, promoted by a sampler (featured on the Castle Communications 2000 box set Here Come The Nice (CMETD 055-1)) featuring a commentary by DJ John Peel, which included the following comments:

1967 was a strange year for pop music with groups experimenting with new sounds and bouncing on and off bandwagons with dizzying speed and agility. They were calling themselves ridiculous names and regretting it shortly. The Nice came together in a void and will be here when the others are in pantomime in Wolverhampton.

The album received largely positive reviews, although it failed to chart. Chris Welch of Melody Maker heard a preview of the album prior to release and in the November 18, 1967 issue stated that it "includes some of the most exciting music I have ever heard produced by a British group. Those who have heard "live" their lengthy work-out on "Rondo" and its explosive climax will be pleased to know it has recorded very well." After release, the same paper opined that the album "successfully captures the musical ingredients that make them so rewarding live", noting interesting experiments in electronic and percussive effects. Disc and Music Echo wrote "crammed into eight long tracks is some of the most exciting original material we’ve heard for a long time."

In the US, Cash Box noted that "Rondo" "starts cookin' early" and also named "The Flower King of Flies" and "The Cry of Eugene" as highlights, calling it a "candidate for plenty of sales action." Billboard enthused "the numbers aren’t merely extended, they are good. The strong organ work of Rondo makes that number a standout instrumental. War and Peace is another good instrumental track. The vocal numbers also are good." A retrospective review by AllMusic's Bruce Eder was mixed, as he called it a "flawed but valiant effort" with strong instrumental work that is let down by the lack of a real lead singer.

Alternate mixes of six of the album's songs would be included on the 1972 compilation Autumn '67 - Spring '68, with longer running times on several.

== Legacy ==
The album was named as one of Classic Rock's "50 Albums That Built Prog Rock". The adaptation of "Rondo" proved highly influential on many prog keyboardists, with Tony Banks noting that the Genesis song "The Knife" was based around a similar organ motif after seeing the Nice play it at The Marquee. "Rondo" would remain a signature piece and encore in Nice, Emerson, Lake & Palmer and Keith Emerson Band concerts until Emerson's passing in 2016.

== Track listing ==
Side one
| No. | Title | Writer(s) | Lead vocals | Length |
|---|---|---|---|---|
| 1. | "Flower King of Flies" | Keith Emerson, Lee Jackson | O'List | 3:19 |
| 2. | "The Thoughts of Emerlist Davjack" | Emerson, David O'List | O'List | 2:49 |
| 3. | "Bonnie K" | Jackson, O'List | Jackson | 3:24 |
| 4. | "Rondo" | Dave Brubeck, Emerson, O'List, Brian Davison, Jackson | None | 8:22 |

Side two
| No. | Title | Writer(s) | Lead vocals | Length |
|---|---|---|---|---|
| 5. | "War and Peace" | Emerson, O'List, Davison, Jackson | None | 5:13 |
| 6. | "Tantalising Maggie" | Emerson, Jackson | Jackson and Emerson | 4:35 |
| 7. | "Dawn" | Davison, Emerson, Jackson | Jackson | 5:17 |
| 8. | "The Cry of Eugene" | Emerson, Jackson, O'List | O'List | 4:36 |

Bonus tracks on 1999 Repertoire reissue

9. "The Thoughts of Emerlist Davjack" (single version) (Emerson, O'List) – 2:48
10. "Azrial (Angel of Death)" (Emerson, Jackson) (Note: Per credits on Nice, for which the song was re-recorded under the title "Azrael Revisited". The "The Thoughts of Emerlist Davjack" single on which "Azrial (Angel of Death)" first appeared credits "Emerlist Davjack" as the writer, and BMI records (see BMI Work #69411) also use this pseudonymous credit.) – 3:44
11. "America" (instrumental) (Leonard Bernstein, Stephen Sondheim, Emerlist Davjack) – 6:18
12. "The Diamond Hard Blue Apples of the Moon" (Emerson, Jackson) (Note: Per credits on the 2019 Refugee boxed set. The "America"/"Second Amendment" single on which "The Diamond Hard Blue Apples of the Moon" first appeared credits "Emerlist Davjack" as the writer, and BMI records also use this pseudonymous credit.) – 2:47
13. "America" (US single edit) (Bernstein, Sondheim, Emerlist Davjack) – 3:55

Bonus tracks on 2003 Castle Music Deluxe Edition

9. "Promo 7" Sampler for Album" – 5:15
10. "Azrial (Angel of Death)" – 3:43
11. "The Thoughts of Emerlist Davjack" (mono single) – 2:47
12. "The Diamond Hard Blue Apples of the Moon" – 2:46
13. "America/Second Amendment" – 6:19

CD 2

1. "Flower King of Flies" (alt. Autumn 67 version/mix) – 3:35
2. "Bonnie K" (alt. Autumn '67 version) – 3:19
3. "Dawn" (alt. Autumn '67 version) – 5:04
4. "Tantalising Maggie" (alt. version) – 4:22
5. "The Cry of Eugene" (alt. Autumn '67 version) – 4:30
6. "The Thoughts of Emerlist Davjack" (ext. alt. Autumn '67 version) – 4:12
7. "Daddy, Where Did I Come From?" (alt. version) – 2:46
8. "America Second Amendment" (alt. stereo version) – 6:14
9. "Sombrero Sam" (BBC session, October 26, 1967) – 3:32
10. "Get to You" (BBC session, June 16, 1968) – 3:40
11. "The Diamond Hard Blue Apples of the Moon" (BBC session, June 16, 1968) – 2:55
12. "Brandenburger" (BBC session, June 16, 1968) – 3:49
13. "Little Arabella (And Sorcery)" (BBC session, June 16, 1968) – 3:39

Bonus tracks on 2004 Fuel 2000 reissue

9. "The Thoughts of Emerlist Davjack" (extended version) – 4:12
10. "Flower King of Flies" (alt. version) – 3:36
11. "Azrael (Angel of Death)" (single B-side) – 3:43
12. "America" (single version) – 6:06
13. "America/Second Amendment" (ext. version) – 6:23
14. "Diamond-Hard Blue Apples of the Moon" (single B-side) – 2:45
15. "Daddy, Where Did I Come From?" (early version) – 2:46

Note: tracks #12 & 13 are reversed from label order, with track #12 running 6:18 and track #13 running 6:06

== Personnel ==
=== The Nice ===
- Keith Emerson – organ, piano, harpsichord, vocals
- Lee Jackson – bass, guitar, vocals, timpani
- David O'List – guitar, trumpet, vocals
- Brian Davison – drums, tubular bells, timpani

=== Technical ===
- Derek Burton and Gered Mankowitz – cover design
