= Ars Longa Vita Brevis (album) =

Studio album by The Nice
- Released: 1 November 1968
- Recorded: August and October 1968
- Studio: Pye Studios
- Genres: Psychedelic rock, progressive rock
- Length: 40:13
- Label: Immediate
- Producer: The Nice

The Nice chronology
The Thoughts of Emerlist Davjack (1968)	Ars Longa Vita Brevis (1968)	Nice (1969)

Ars Longa Vita Brevis is the second album by the English progressive rock group the Nice.

== Background ==
In the summer of 1968 the Nice had their first taste of commercial success when their cover of "America", the popular West Side Story number re-imagined as a heavy instrumental acid-rocker (Keith Emerson called it "the first instrumental protest song", chosen as a reaction to the assassination of MLK that spring), hit No. 21 on the UK charts. The group achieved further notoriety in the press when they were banned from further appearances at the Royal Albert Hall after Emerson had burned a makeshift spray-painting of the American flag during a prestige gig at the venue in July.

Many of the second album's songs had been developed when David O'List was still a member of the group and played during various BBC sessions between January and August 1968, with him contributing guitar parts; these included "Daddy Where Did I Come From?", "Brandenburger" (initially developed separately from the side-long suite it would eventually be part of, and among the first full-scale classical adaptations in rock), "Little Arabella" and "Ars Longa Vita Brevis" (in an early version missing the "Awakening" and "Brandenburger" movements). An early outtake of "Daddy, Where Did I Come From" featuring O'List on guitar was later released on the compilation Autumn '67 - Spring '68.

O'List was subsequently fired from the band on October 1, 1968, not long after initial recordings for the album began that August. After flirting briefly with auditioning a replacement guitarist (including Steve Howe, later to join Yes), the Nice decided to carry on as a keyboard-led trio and completed the album that October at Pye Studios with engineer Don Brewer. The material recorded in August with O'List was largely scrapped and re-recorded.

== Songs and recording ==
In an interview for the September 1968 issue of Beat Instrumental, Emerson described how the group usually composed: "I usually start with one phrase which I work on until I've got a melody. I tape this and hand it over to our bassist, Lee Jackson, who writes the lyrics ─ or sometimes it works out that I write music to one of his poems."

Structurally, side one of the album picked up where its predecessor left off, with shorter psych-pop numbers like "Daddy, Where Did I Come From" and "Happy Freuds" sitting next to extended jams based on classical compositions, such as Sibelius' "Intermezzo from the Karelia Suite", only this time without the participation of a guitarist. "Daddy Where Did I Come From" contains a comedic spoken word break of a drunk father (played by the group's manager Tony Stratton Smith) trying, and failing, to inform his son (played by drummer Brian Davison's nephew) about the facts of life. "Happy Freuds" is a Zappa-influenced puncturing of self-assured people with heavy use of echo delay on the vocal. The cover of "Karelia Suite", initially suggested to the group by friend Roy Harper, features a lengthy interlude with Jackson bowing his bass, followed by Emerson creating structured feedback with his Hammond L100 through a Marshall amplifier, supplemented by a Dallas Arbiter fuzz-face unit. Side one closes with the short piece "Don Edito el Gruva", which consists of 13 seconds of the orchestra on side two tuning up. The title is translated as "Don Edits the Grooves", referring to engineer Don Brewer.

A significant evolution was taken on side two with the appearance of the multi-sectional suite "Ars Longa Vita Brevis." The suite begins with a prelude featuring a full orchestra (the London Philharmonic, conducted by Robert Stewart) followed by an extended drum solo ("Awakening"), a more conventional acid rock number with guest electric guitar by Malcolm Langstaff ("Realisation"), a rock adaptation of Bach's Brandenburg Concerto No.3 in G Major featuring a return of the orchestra ("Brandenburger", released as a non-charting single in November 1968), a lightning-paced Jazz-fusion Hammond organ jam ("Denial") and an orchestral coda. "Ars Longa Vita Brevis" was, along with Procol Harum's "In Held 'Twas In I" released around the same time, the first side-long progressive rock suite and served as a template for Emerson's later efforts on Five Bridges, Tarkus and "Karn Evil 9". Emerson recalled that during a break in the recording of "Brandenburger", he heard several of the orchestral musicians complaining about the noise and tempo of the arrangement, whereupon he decided to crank the volume of his Hammond even louder.

The album unusually contains some songs in which Emerson sings lead vocals: he sings the lead in "Daddy, Where Did I Come From", takes the second lead vocal on "Happy Freuds" and the bridge in "Little Arabella". Guest guitarist Malcolm Langstaff, who played on the second movement of the suite titled "Realisation", died in 2007.

The October 26, 1968 issue of Record Mirror reported that the album was nearly ready after over 60 hours of recording, with the title track having been edited from 24 to 20 minutes in length.

== Title and album cover ==
The title is an aphorism attributed to Hippocrates usually rendered as "Art is long, life is short"; Keith Emerson's interpretation of this can be gauged from his sleevenote:

Newton's first law of motion states a body will remain at rest or continue with uniform motion in a straight line unless acted on by a force. This time the force happened to come from a European source. Ours is an extension of the original Allegro from Brandenburg Concerto No. 3. Yesterday I met someone who changed my life, today we put down a sound that made our aim accurate. Tomorrow is yesterday's history and art will still be there, even if life terminates.

For the cover, the group hired photographer Gered Mankowitz to create a composite overlap of X-rays of the three band members. While at the medical clinic, Emerson was informed that his X-ray showed two broken ribs, sustained from his intensely physical performances during the group's live shows. Another idea for the cover was to inject the band members with a fluorescent liquid that would show up as psychedelic colors in the X-ray, although this was refused by the doctor; nonetheless, Immediate Records head Andrew Loog Oldham told it to the press as if it was true. The cover went on to win the New Musical Express award for Best Pop Album Sleeve that year.

== Release and reception ==
Professional ratings
Review scores
Source	Rating
Allmusic	4/5 stars
Rolling Stone	(neutral)
TopTenReviews	11/15 stars

The original US version of the album opened with the earlier single "America". Released in November 1968, Ars Longa Vita Brevis failed to chart in either the UK or US, although it received a positive review from Record Mirror which stated it was "musically excellent, very original, and going in a good direction to boot." Melody Maker was even more impressed, calling it "not only a vast improvement on their first album, but a major breakthrough in pop group experimentation which shows them moving in a direction far removed from any other group, British or American. In fact, the phrase "pop group" becomes obsolete in view of their bold and imaginative crossbreeding of classical, jazz and rock and roll music." Retrospectively, Allmusic's Bruce Eder described the album as "a genuinely groundbreaking effort."

== Track listing ==
All songs written by Keith Emerson and Lee Jackson, except where noted.

=== Side one ===
1. "Daddy, Where Did I Come From" – 3:44
2. "Little Arabella" – 4:18
3. "Happy Freuds" – 3:25
4. "Intermezzo from the Karelia Suite" (Sibelius) – 8:57
5. "Don Edito el Gruva" (Emerson, Jackson, Brian Davison) – 0:13

=== Side two ===
6. "Ars Longa Vita Brevis" – 19:20

- "Prelude" (Emerson) – 1:49
- "1st Movement – Awakening" (Davison) – 4:01
- "2nd Movement – Realisation" (Jackson, David O'List, Emerson) – 4:54
- "3rd Movement – Acceptance "Brandenburger"" (J.S.Bach, Davison, Emerson, Jackson) – 4:23
- "4th Movement – Denial" (Davison, Emerson, Jackson) – 3:23
- "Coda – Extension to the Big Note" (Emerson) – 0:46

Bonus tracks on the 1973 Columbia release

1. "America" (Stephen Sondheim and Leonard Bernstein)
2. "2nd Amendment" (Davison, Jackson)

Added to side one (tracks 1 and 2) on the Columbia Records release via their Columbia Special Products subsidiary.

Bonus tracks on the 1998 rerelease

7. "Brandenburger" (Mono single mix)
8. "Happy Freuds" (Mono single mix)

Bonus track on the 2005 rerelease

7. "Happy Freuds" – 3:27

== Personnel ==
The Nice

- Keith Emerson – Hammond organ, piano, lead vocals (1), 2nd lead vocals (2, 3, 6)
- Lee Jackson – bass guitar, lead vocals (2, 3, 6), backing vocals (1, 3), spoken word (1)
- Brian Davison – drums
- David O'List – guitar on "America"

with:

- Malcolm Langstaff – guitar (6c)
- Robert Stewart – orchestral arranger, conductor

Technical

- Don Brewer – engineer/consultant
- Gered Mankowitz – cover photograph and X-rays of The Nice
