= King Progress =

Studio album by Jackson Heights
- Released: 1970
- Studio: Advision Studios, London; IBC Studios, London
- Genre: Rock
- Length: 35:59
- Label: Charisma (UK); Mercury (US)
- Producer: Lee Jackson

Jackson Heights chronology
King Progress (1970)	The Fifth Avenue Bus (1972)

King Progress is the debut album by Jackson Heights. The album was released in the U.K. on Charisma Records in 1970. In the U.S., the album was released on Mercury Records in 1971. The album is known for the song "The Cry of Eugene", a track originally written and played by The Nice on their first album, The Thoughts of Emerlist Davjack.

Tony Stratton Smith wrote in the original liner notes that "this record gives ribs and muscle to acoustic music." In January 1971, Lee Jackson told Hit Parader magazine that the track "King Progress" had an ecological theme which audiences were responsive to.

It would be the only album that included Charlie Harcourt (who would later go on to join Cat Mother & the All Night Newsboys and Lindisfarne), Tommy Slone, and Mario Enrique Covarrubias Tapia who would leave shortly after the album was released.

== Track listing ==
All songs written by Lee Jackson and Charlie Harcourt except noted.

1. "Mr. Screw" – 3:21
2. "Since I Last Saw You" – 7:03
3. "Sunshine Freak" – 4:52
4. "King Progress" – 3:30
5. "Doubting Thomas" – 4:16
6. "Insomnia" – 5:03
7. "The Cry of Eugene" (Keith Emerson, Lee Jackson, David O'List) – 7:54

== Personnel ==
Jackson Heights

- Lee Jackson - lead vocals, 6- and 12-string acoustic guitars, harmonica
- Charlie Harcourt - electric and Spanish guitars, backing vocals, Harpsichord, Mellotron, organ, piano
- Mario Enrique Covarrubias Tapia - bass and Spanish guitars, backing vocals
- Tommy Slone - drums, congas, triangle, timpani, abdominal percussion (5)
