= Live in Concert Newcastle City Hall 1974 =

Live album by Refugee
- Released: 2007
- Recorded: 16 June 1974
- Venue: Newcastle City Hall
- Genre: Progressive rock
- Length: 64:17
- Label: Voiceprint

Refugee chronology
Refugee (1974)	Live in Concert Newcastle City Hall 1974 (2007)

Live in Concert Newcastle City Hall 1974 is a live album by the British progressive rock group Refugee, recorded on 16 June 1974 onto cassette straight from the soundboard. It was released under the Voiceprint Records in 2007. The album includes the Nice song "The Diamond Hard Blue Apples of the Moon" and a cover of Bob Dylan's "She Belongs to Me", various compositions from the band's debut album and the four-minute "Refugee Jam".

== Reception ==
Professional ratings
Review scores
Source	Rating
AllMusic	4.5/5 stars
All About Jazz	3.5/5 stars

Bruce Eder at AllMusic stated "To say it lives up to that promise is putting it mildly. If you were never overly impressed with the content of Refugee's one and only studio album, this performance really does justify the praise that they received in the British press".

John Kelman of All About Jazz wrote that the album "proves that Refugee was every bit as good as The Nice," and commented: "The recording quality... is clear enough, and demonstrates that Refugee live was even better than Refugee in the studio. Had Yes not recruited Moraz it's likely that a group stymied by the very average Jackson and Davison would never have achieved great commercial success, but this unearthed live recording does prove Refugee to be a group that, for Moraz alone, deserves to be remembered."

Writing for VintageRock.com, Shawn Perry stated that Moraz's "master strokes on 'Papillon' place him in the pantheon of the greats," and remarked: "At the same time, Moraz piles on scads of amorphous layers that both frighten and entice. He squeezes the Moog for a lot more juice and uses the Hammond to underscore his command of the harmonious flow of the music."

== Track listing ==
1. "Outro - Ritt Mickley" (Patrick Moraz) - 2:53
2. "One Left Handed Peter Pan" (Moraz, Lee Jackson) - 8:44
3. "The Diamond Hard Blue Apples of the Moon" (Keith Emerson, Jackson) - 7:00
4. "Someday" (Moraz, Jackson) - 6:06
5. "Papillon" (Moraz) - 8:00
6. "She Belongs to Me" (Bob Dylan) - 8:54
7. "Grand Canyon Suite" - 18:24
  - a) "The Source" (Moraz)
  - b) "Theme for the Canyon" (Moraz)
  - c) "The Journey" (Moraz, Jackson)
  - d) "Rapids" (Moraz)
  - e) "The Mighty Colorado" (Moraz, Jackson)
8. "Refugee Jam" (Moraz, Jackson, Brian Davison) - 4:13

== Personnel ==
- Lee Jackson: bass, guitars, vocals
- Patrick Moraz: keyboards, alpine horn
- Brian Davison: drums, percussion, tympani
