= Vivacitas =

Live album by The Nice
- Released: 16 September 2003
- Recorded: 4 October 2002
- Venue: Royal Concert Hall, Glasgow, Scotland
- Genre: Progressive rock
- Length: 98:26 (excluding interview)
- Label: Sanctuary

The Nice chronology
Autumn '67 - Spring '68 (1972)	Vivacitas (2003)

Professional ratings
Review scores
Source	Rating
Allmusic	3.5/5 stars
DPRP	(8/10)

Vivacitas (subtitled "Live at Glasgow 2002") is a live album recorded by the Nice, who reformed for a set of concerts, augmented by the Keith Emerson Band for the second half of the concert. David O'List, The Nice's original guitarist, did not take part, and was replaced by Dave Kilminster. The album consists of versions of pieces which had been live favourites during the Nice's heyday between 1967 and 1970, two piano solo pieces by Emerson, some pieces from the Emerson, Lake & Palmer repertoire performed by the Keith Emerson Band with The Nice personnel added for the two encores, and a 2001 interview with Emerson, Lee Jackson and Brian Davison by Chris Welch.

== Track listing ==
=== Disc one: The Nice (qt) ===
1. "America"/"Rondo" (Bernstein, Brubeck, Emerson) – 11:13
2. "Little Arabella" (Emerson, Jackson) – 4:57
3. "She Belongs to Me" (Dylan, Emerson) – 6:21
4. "The Cry of Eugene" (Emerson, Jackson, O'List) – 5:02
5. "Hang on to a Dream" (Emerson, Hardin) – 10:30
6. "Country Pie" (Bach, Dylan, Emerson) – 5:57
7. "Karelia Suite" (Sibelius, Emerson) – 7:58

=== Disc two ===
1. "A Blade of Grass" (Emerson) – 2:11; Emerson solo piano
2. "A Cajun Alley" (Emerson) – 4:11; Emerson solo piano
3. "Tarkus" (Emerson, Lake) – 21:00; Keith Emerson Band
4. "Hoedown" (Copland) – 5:06; Keith Emerson Band
5. "Fanfare for the Common Man" (Copland, Emerson, Lake, Palmer) – 7:55; Keith Emerson Band + Jackson and Davison
6. "Honky Tonk Train Blues" (Meade Lux Lewis) – 6:05; Keith Emerson Band + Jackson and Davison

=== Disc three ===
1. Interview with Chris Welch – 22:27

== Personnel ==
The Nice

- Keith Emerson – piano, keyboards, synth
- Lee Jackson – bass guitar, vocals
- Brian Davison – drums
- Dave Kilminster – guitar

Keith Emerson Band

- Keith Emerson – piano, keyboards, synth
- Dave Kilminster – guitar, vocals
- Phil Williams – bass guitar
- Pete Riley – drums
