= Autumn '67 – Spring '68 =

Compilation album by The Nice
- Released: 1972 (UK); 1973 (US)
- Recorded: Autumn '67 – Spring '68
- Genre: Progressive rock, psychedelic rock
- Length: 36:46 (original LP); 44:36 (with bonus tracks)
- Label: Charisma

The Nice chronology
Elegy (1971)	Autumn '67 – Spring '68 (1972)	Vivacitas (2003)

American cover
- US Cover

Autumn '67 – Spring '68 is a 1972 compilation by the English psychedelic rock and progressive rock group the Nice. The album consists of outtakes and alternate versions of previously released songs, which were recorded between Autumn 1967 and Spring 1968.

The cover for the UK issue was designed by Storm Thorgerson of Hipgnosis. It was released in the United States in 1973 with the title Autumn to Spring and different cover art.

The album has been reissued on vinyl as The Nice Featuring America. The album was remastered and reissued on Japanese SHM-CD in 2009. All of these tracks were also included as bonus tracks on 1990 reissues of the Nice's Five Bridges and Elegy albums.

== Track listing ==
=== Side one ===
1. "The Thoughts of Emerlist Davjack" (Keith Emerson, David O'List) – 4:14
2. "Flower King of Flies" (Emerson, Lee Jackson) – 3:37
3. "Bonnie K" (Jackson, O'List) – 3:20
4. "America" (Leonard Bernstein, Stephen Sondheim, Brian Davison, Jackson) – 6:07

=== Side two ===
5. "Diamond Hard Blue Apples Of The Moon" (Emerson, Jackson) – 2:45
6. "Dawn" (Davison, Emerson, Jackson) – 5:06
7. "Tantalising Maggie" (O'List, Jackson) – 4:21
8. "Cry of Eugene" (O'List, Emerson, Jackson) – 4:31
9. "Daddy, Where Did I Come From?" (Emerson, Jackson) – 2:48

=== 2009 bonus tracks ===
10. "Azrael" (Emerson, Jackson) – 3:47
11. "Diary of an Empty Day" (Emerson, Jackson) – 3:58

== Personnel ==
The Nice

- Keith Emerson – keyboards, vocals
- Lee Jackson – bass guitar, vocals
- Brian Davison – drums
- Davy O'List – guitar, trumpet, flute, vocals
