= Elegy (The Nice album) =

Live album by The Nice
- Released: 2 April 1971
- Recorded: 19-20 December 1969
- Venue: Fillmore East, New York City (two tracks)
- Genre: Progressive rock
- Length: 39:27
- Label: UK: Charisma CAS 1030; US: Mercury SR 61324; France, Germany: Philips
- Producer: The Nice

The Nice chronology
| Five Bridges (1970) | Elegy (1971) | Autumn '67 – Spring '68 (1972) |

Professional ratings
Review scores
| Source | Rating |
|---|---|
| AllMusic | 4/5 stars |
| George Starostin's Only Solitaire | 8/15 |

Elegy was the final official album release by The Nice, Keith Emerson having since moved on to Emerson, Lake & Palmer, Lee Jackson to Jackson Heights and Brian Davison to Every Which Way. It consists of live versions of songs from earlier releases, a studio take of a Tchaikovsky piece ("Pathetique") that had been released live on the previous album and a previously unheard reinterpretation of Dylan's "My Back Pages". Released a year after The Nice's final show in March 1970 in an attempt to capitalize on ELP's burgeoning success, the album achieved number 5 in the UK album chart.

"Hang on to a Dream" and "America" were recorded live at Fillmore East, New York during the group's 1969 tour. It was during this tour that The Nice shared a bill with King Crimson, which led to Keith Emerson and Greg Lake hooking up to form a new band, Emerson, Lake & Palmer. "Hang On To A Dream" features extensive use of Emerson striking the interior piano strings, while "America" closes with several minutes of Hammond organ feedback. The two studio outtakes, "My Back Pages" and "Third Movement, Pathetique" had been recorded in 1969; "My Back Pages" featured a section which would be requoted on ELP's "Blues Variations" while a live orchestrated version of "Pathetique" had already seen release on Five Bridges.

== Cover art ==
The UK edition came in a gatefold sleeve. It was designed by Hipgnosis (Storm Thorgerson and Aubrey Powell), well known as designers of album covers for Pink Floyd and other progressive rock bands. The front and back covers show a Sahara desert scene with a line of fifty red footballs (credited to Mettoy Playcraft) receding towards a distant dune. The inside of the cover shows, in the distance, a mesa or plateau; in front is a gravelly landscape strewn with memorabilia of the Nice, such as older album covers, publicity shots, press releases and a scrapbook of press cuttings.

== Track listing ==
=== Side one ===
1. "Hang On to a Dream" (Live) (Tim Hardin) – 12:43
2. "My Back Pages" (Bob Dylan) – 9:12

=== Side two ===
1. "Third Movement, Pathetique" (Group Only) (Tchaikovsky; arranged by The Nice) – 7.05
2. "America" (Live) (Leonard Bernstein, Stephen Sondheim, The Nice) – 10:27
CD release 1990

The CD release 1990 contains six additional bonus tracks taken from 1972 compilation Autumn '67 – Spring '68 and the length of the original four tracks is slightly different.

1. "Hang On to a Dream" (Live) (Tim Hardin) – 12:42
2. "My Back Pages" (Bob Dylan) – 9:10
3. "Third Movement, Pathetique" (Group Only) (Tchaikovsky; arranged by The Nice) – 7;05
4. "America" (Live) (Bernstein, Sondheim, The Nice) – 10:17
5. "Diamond-Hard Blue Apples of the Moon" (Emerson, Jackson) – 2:46
6. "Dawn" (Davison, Emerson, Jackson) – 5:05
7. "Tantalising Maggie" (Emerson, Jackson) – 4:19
8. "Cry of Eugene" (O'List, Emerson, Jackson) – 4:30
9. "Daddy Where Did I Come From?" (Emerson, Jackson) – 2:46
10. "Azirial" (Emerson, Jackson) – 3:46

"Azrial" had been the B-side of the single release "The Thoughts of Emerlist Davjack," and "Diamond-Hard Blue Apples of the Moon" that of "America."

The arrangement of "My Back Pages" was inspired by Keith Jarrett's 1968 Vortex recording of the song but the majority is Emerson's creation. The performance is in two parts with the first featuring piano and the second featuring Hammond organ.
2009 Digital Remaster

The 2009 Digital Remastered CD contains only two additional bonus tracks and the length of the original four tracks is slightly different.

1. "Hang On to a Dream" (Live) (Tim Hardin) – 12:41
2. "My Back Pages" (Bob Dylan) – 9:12
3. "Third Movement, Pathetique" (Group Only) (Tchaikovsky; arranged by The Nice) – 7;07
4. "America" (Live) (Bernstein, Sondheim, The Nice) – 10:22
5. "Country Pie" (BBC Radio 1's "Sounds of the Seventies") (Bob Dylan) – 4:57
6. "Pathetique (Symphony No. 6, 3rd Movement)" (BBC Radio 1's Sounds of the Seventies) (Tchaikovsky; arranged by The Nice) – 6:59

== Personnel ==
The Nice

- Keith Emerson – piano, organ
- Lee Jackson – bass guitar, vocals
- Brian Davison – drums, percussion

== Charts ==
| Chart (1971) | Peak position |
|---|---|
| UK Albums (Official Charts) | 5 |
