= Nice (The Nice album) =

1969 album by The Nice

Studio album / Live album by The Nice
- Released: 22 August 1969
- Recorded: Trident Studios, London, mid-1969 (Tracks 1–4), Fillmore East, New York City, 9–10 April 1969 (Tracks 5–6)
- Genre: Progressive rock
- Length: 43:46
- Label: Immediate
- Producer: The Nice

The Nice chronology
Ars Longa Vita Brevis (1968)	Nice (1969)	Five Bridges (1970)

Alternative cover
- US album cover

Nice is the third and final studio album by The Nice; it was titled Everything As Nice As Mother Makes It in the US after Immediate broke their distribution deal with Columbia. Nice had been initially released in the US with a slightly longer version of "Rondo 69" not available on the UK or on the independently distributed US versions. The first US version of Nice was briefly reissued in 1973 by Columbia Special Products.

== Background ==
By the end of 1968, The Nice had one hit ("America") and two critically well-received albums to their name, which resulted in rising popularity. In end-of-the-year polls for both Melody Maker and Disc and Music Echo the group ranked ninth among British groups while placing as high as third in that category in New Musical Express. In Beat Instrumental, Keith Emerson is considered the best keyboardist ahead of Brian Auger and Steve Winwood. The group had evolved into a keyboard-driven three-piece after the firing of guitarist David O'List in October 1968, although the collaboration with an orchestra on the title track to Ars Longa Vita Brevis led to an increasing desire to work with classical musicians. On February 4, 1969 at the Institute of Contemporary Arts in London the group participated in a "Pop-Chamber Music" event with violinists John Mayer and Ric Grech (of Family) joining the group, while at the Lyceum on May 30 they were joined by a 15-piece choir. Bruce Johnston of The Beach Boys, who attended the Lyceum show, remarked the next night on stage "I saw The Nice last night. They were fantastic. They are the best group I've seen and you must all see them."

The group undertook an American tour from March 20 to May 18, adding a second Hammond organ (model A105) to their stage setup while Brian Davison switched to a new gold-colored Hayman drum kit. Sessions for the third album had begun just before the tour and continued with recording in the United States, as well as the recording of live material from April 9-10 shows at Fillmore East. When asked about the composition of new material, bassist Lee Jackson noted that Keith will write a tune from keyboard improvisations done in the evening that Lee puts the words to, noting "The Nice are European and improvise on the structures of European music and that's where their main influences come from."

== Songs and recording ==
Continuing the Nice's pioneering fusion of jazz, classical, and rock, the album consists of studio (1–4) and live (5–6) tracks. The studio side was largely recorded at Trident Studios in London, with a March 20, 1969 interview in International Times stating that "Azrael Revisited" and "Hang On To A Dream" had already been completed. The opening "Azrael Revisited" is a remake of the 1967 B-side "Azrial (Angel of Death)", adapted to the new keyboard-led trio format. For this version, Emerson detuned the strings on his piano slightly for a honky-tonk feel, while including a quote of Sergei Rachmaninoff's "Prelude in C# minor, Op. 3 No. 2." The cover of Tim Hardin's "Hang On to a Dream" had been played live since the group's days as a four-piece, including a 1968 rendition recorded for the BBC. The recording featured Lee Jackson on bowed bass and a ghostly choral arrangement by Duncan Browne which was overdubbed five times over to achieve an 80-voice sound. Emerson had been tempted to put two versions of the song on the album, one played on organ and one played on piano, although he decided to stick with the latter. It became a popular live number which showcased Emerson's idiosyncratic jazz piano skills, including manual striking of the interior strings. A live version played on organ can be found on the archival release Live at the Fillmore East: December 1969.

"Diary of an Empty Day" is a shorter composition, based on the 5th movement rondo from Lalo's Symphonie espagnole, which features the only guitar work on the album, an acoustic strummed at the close. According to the album's liner notes, the lyrics had been penned "on a dull journey from Newcastle to Birmingham." "For Example" is a multi-sectional original piece moving through R&B, classical and lounge jazz that briefly quotes the Beatles' "Norwegian Wood (This Bird Has Flown)". The track had been inspired by fans who kept asking why the group didn't play the blues, although the group didn't leave it there. The recording closes with a five-piece horn section (two trumpets, a tenor sax and a baritone sax) played by Pepper Adams, Joe Newman, John Surman and Eddie Thornton which had been recorded in New York City on May 1.

The material on the second side was taped live at Fillmore East and engineered by Eddie Kramer. The band included these songs since they felt they had changed significantly since their early days. "Rondo '69" was taken from the group's debut album, having become Emerson's signature piece by that time, now performed without guitar accompaniment. "She Belongs To Me" was a Bob Dylan cover transformed into a 12-minute progressive rock jam featuring several extended quotes from Bach, a snippet of Elmer Bernstein's theme from The Magnificent Seven and Copland's "Hoedown" from Rodeo, the last of which Emerson would return to with Emerson, Lake & Palmer.

== Title and album cover ==
The original idea for the cover was to make it look like a family photo album with various snapshots of the group interspersed with handwritten letters in a gatefold sleeve, but Emerson was highly displeased with the results. When told it was too late to change the artwork, the group asked to be released from their contract with Immediate Records; however, they were able to arrange for the American cover to feature a different title and artwork, with the phrase "everything nice as mother makes it" stemming from an old Victorian poster hanging in the Baker Street restaurant where they were meeting. Immediate went into voluntary liquidation shortly afterward.

== Reception ==
Professional ratings
Review scores
Source	Rating
AllMusic	4.5/5 stars
Robert Christgau	D+

The album was a great success, reaching number 3 in the UK Album charts and solidifying the band's status as one of the most influential progressive rock groups in the country. It failed to chart in the US, where the Nice remained obscure in spite of touring hip American venues like the Fillmore West and Fillmore East that year and receiving rave reviews.

Critical reception at the time was largely positive, with New Musical Express enthusing that "no group had done more to advance the musical side of pop in recent years." Don Heckman of The New York Times also gave a glowing review, while Lloyd Grossman of Fusion noted the group "use jazz and classical elements with an ease and brilliance that few bands can equal." On the other hand, Robert Christgau of The Village Voice quickly established himself as one of Emerson's harshest critics when he admitted the keyboardist's technical virtuosity but bemoaned a lack of taste, concluding that the Nice were "the most overrated group this side of The Moody Blues." More recently, Bruce Eder of AllMusic claimed it was a "rich mixture of psychedelic rock, jazz and classical that did a lot to map the format for progressive rock."

== Track listing ==
=== Side one ===
1. "Azrael Revisited" (Keith Emerson, Lee Jackson) – 5:52
2. "Hang On to a Dream" (Tim Hardin) – 4:46
3. "Diary of an Empty Day" (Music: Edouard Lalo arr. by Emerson, lyrics: Jackson) – 3:54
4. "For Example" (Emerson, Jackson) – 8:51

=== Side two ===
5. "Rondo '69'" (Brubeck, Emerson, Jackson, Davison) – 7:53 (8:27 on the first US version)
6. "She Belongs to Me" (Bob Dylan) – 12:15

== Personnel ==
The Nice

- Keith Emerson – Hammond organ, pianos
- Lee Jackson – bass guitar, vocals
- Brian Davison – drums, percussion

== Charts ==
Chart (1969)	Peak position
UK Albums (Official Charts)	3
