= Refugee (Refugee album) =

Studio album by Refugee
- Released: March 1974
- Recorded: February 1974
- Studios: Island, London
- Genre: Progressive rock
- Length: 51:24
- Label: Charisma
- Producers: John Burns, Refugee

Refugee chronology
Refugee (1974)	Live in Concert Newcastle City Hall 1974 (2007)

Song sample
- 30 seconds of "Ritt Mickley": file; help

Professional ratings
Review scores
Source	Rating
AllMusic	4/5 stars

Refugee is the only studio album from the progressive rock band Refugee, released in March 1974 on Charisma Records.

== Background and recording ==
The opening song "Papillon" (French for "butterfly") had no title when it was written, or even when it was recorded. While listening to the finished mix, the band members decided that the opening Moog flurry sounded like butterfly wings, and named the song after the recently released film Papillon.

"Someday" was written about the breakup of band member Lee Jackson's marriage.

Keyboardist Patrick Moraz came up with the idea of writing a song about the Grand Canyon and asked Jackson to write lyrics for it. Jackson took books and maps out of the library to research and get inspiration for the lyrics.

The title of the track "Ritt Mickley" originated from Moraz's strong French Swiss accent, when he asked the other band members to play the song again but more "rhythmically".

== Release history ==
The album was first released in March 1974 on Charisma Records. It was re-released under the TimeWave label on 27 June 2006, and as an expanded three-disc boxed set from Esoteric Recordings in 2019, which also included Live in Concert Newcastle City Hall 1974.

== Reception ==
Reviewing the album for AllMusic, Christopher Evans said: "Though there's no shortage of de rigueur complex time signatures here, this is also a band with fire in its belly, nowhere more so than in the last five minutes of the extended "Credo," where Jackson's bass runs and Davison's drumming combine to truly thrilling effect."

== Track listing ==
- All songs written by Lee Jackson and Patrick Moraz, except where noted.
1. "Papillion" (Moraz) – 5:10
2. "Someday" – 5:03
3. "Grand Canyon Suite" – 16:54
  - "The Source" – 2:23
  - "Theme for the Canyon" – 3:16
  - "The Journey" – 3:54
  - "The Rapids" – 2:53
  - "The Mighty Colorado" – 4:30
4. "Gatecrasher" – 1:03
5. "Ritt Mickley" (Moraz) - 5:57
6. "Credo" - 18:08
  - "Prelude" - 3:41
  - "I Believe, Pt. 1" - 2:48
  - "Credo Theme" - 0:39
  - "Credo Toccata & Song (The Lost Cause)" (Jackson, Moraz, Jean Ristori) - 3:37
  - "Agitato" - 1:36
  - "I Believe, Pt. 2" - 1:10
  - "Variation" - 2:57
  - "Main Theme & Finale" - 1:36

=== Esoteric Recordings expanded edition ===
Disc two - BBC Radio One in Concert

1. Ritt Mickley (Moraz)
2. Someday
3. Grand Canyon Suite

Disc three - Live at Newcastle City Hall

1. Ritt Mickley (outro) (Moraz)
2. One Left Handed Peter Pan
3. The Diamond Hard Blue Apples of the Moon (Keith Emerson, Jackson)
4. Someday
5. Papillon (Moraz)
6. She Belongs to Me (Bob Dylan)
7. The Grand Canyon Suite
8. Refugee Jam (Moraz, Jackson, Brian Davison)

== Personnel ==
Refugee

- Patrick Moraz - mini-moog, AKS synthesiser, piano, electric piano, clavinet, organ, pipe organ, marimbaphone, alpine horn, electronic slinky, mellotron, occasional vocals
- Lee Jackson - bass, electric cello, guitar, 12-string acoustic guitar, lead vocals
- Brian Davison - drums, tympani, gongs, Tibetan temple bells, African drums, kabassa, broken glass

== Production ==
- Arranged: Refugee
- Produced: John Burns and Refugee
- Engineered and mixed: Patrick Moraz
