= Don Shinn =

British musician (1945–2023)

- Also known as: Donald John Shinn
- Born: Donald John Walsh; 15 December 1945; West Ham, London, England
- Origin: Southampton, England
- Died: 18 February 2023 (aged 77) Southampton, England
- Genres: British R&B, prog rock, jazz-rock
- Occupation: Keyboardist
- Instruments: Organ, piano, harpsichord
- Years active: 1964–2023

Donald John Shinn (15 December 1945 – 18 February 2023) was an English keyboard player, multi-instrumentalist, composer, and vocalist. He is widely regarded as the first progressive rock musician ever with his May 1966 "A-Minor Explosion" single. He was known primarily as an organist and pianist, and also played vibraphone.

== Biography ==
He was born Donald John Walsh in West Ham, London, and when young was adopted by the Shinn family in Southampton, Hampshire, where he grew up. He learned piano as a child, before joining the military and playing clarinet in an Army band. After returning to Southampton, he bought a Bird Duplex organ and joined local band The Lonely Ones, becoming known for his habit of playing the organ pedals with bare feet.

After the band renamed themselves The Soul Agents, they recorded three singles for Pye Records, produced by Tony Hatch. Other band members were Johnny Keeping (vocals), Tony Good (guitar), Jim Sach (bass), and Roger Pope (drums). In 1964–65, the band were the regular backing group for singer Rod Stewart. After Keeping and Sach left, The Soul Agents continued as a trio of Shinn, Good and Pope, with Shinn upgrading to a Hammond organ. Shinn was hospitalised with tuberculosis for several months in 1965, but after his recovery formed a new version of The Soul Agents with Pope, Dave Glover (bass) and Pete Hunt (vocals). Their final single, "A-Minor Explosion" / "Pits of Darkness", credited to Don Shinn & The Soul Agents, was released on the Polydor label in 1966. Like the band's other releases, this was not a commercial success, but both sides are now seen as "a testament to his credentials as a pioneer of prog.... combining neo-classical flourishes with jazz licks and R&B raunch...". Shinn was particularly influential on Keith Emerson, who adopted some of Shinn's onstage performance techniques such as jamming a screwdriver into the keyboard. Shinn also recorded with another Southampton band, The MeddyEvils.

The Soul Agents disbanded, and Shinn formed a new group, simply called Shinn, in early 1967, with Eddie Lamb (vocals), Paul Newton (bass – later of Uriah Heep), and Brian Davison (drums – later of The Nice). However, the band split up after a few months, and Shinn joined The Echoes, backing Dusty Springfield. In late 1967, record producer Denis Preston invited Shinn to record a solo album. The instrumental album, initially titled Don Shinn... Takes a Trip but then retitled Temples With Prophets for release in the UK, was eventually issued by Columbia in early 1969. Shinn's second album, Departures was released later in 1969. Shinn also worked as a session musician, playing organ, electric piano and harpsichord on James Taylor's debut album.

In 1969, Shinn co-founded the band Dada, with guitarist and arranger Pete Gage, and singers Elkie Brooks and Paul Korda. Shinn wrote or co-wrote several of the tracks on their 1970 album, and, after they added singer Robert Palmer, Shinn toured the US with the band. After returning to the UK, Shinn left the band as it transformed itself into Vinegar Joe. He also worked with Kiki Dee, Engelbert Humperdinck, Stan Tracey, Persian vocalist Parvaneh Farid, and Renaissance. In the early 1970s, Shinn joined former Soul Agents bandmate Pete Hunt in the jazz rock band Iguana, but in 1974 left the British music business and moved to Norway.

Shinn lived in Norway until the mid-1990s, and played in many local bands and with visiting musicians. He returned to Southampton in 1995, and continued to play with local bands as well as playing church organs. His Columbia albums have been reissued on CD.

He died in 2023, at the age of 77.
