= Brian Davison =

Brian Davison is the name of

- Brian Davison (cricketer) (born 1946), former cricketer playing for Rhodesia, Gloucestershire, Leicestershire and Tasmania, ex-member of the Tasmanian House of Assembly
- Brian Davison (drummer) (1942–2008), British drummer (The Nice, Refugee, Gong)
