= Lee Jackson (bassist) =

English bassist (born 1943)

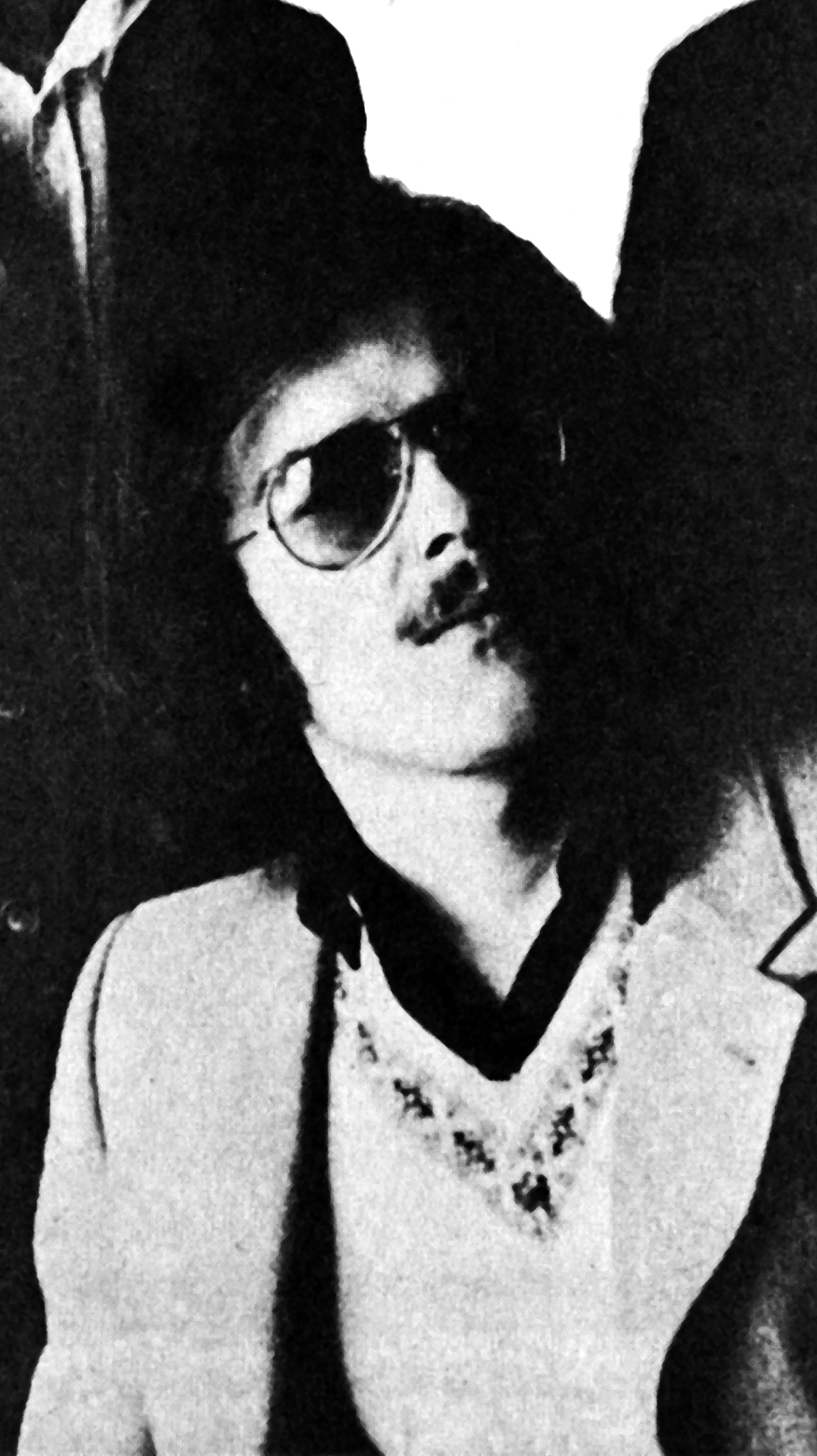
- Jackson in 1969

Background information
- Born: Keith Anthony Joseph Jackson; 8 January 1943 (age 83); Newcastle upon Tyne, England
- Origin: London, England
- Genres: Progressive rock; folk rock
- Occupations: Musician; singer
- Instruments: Bass guitar; vocals; guitar
- Years active: 1960s–present
- Formerly of: The Nice; Jackson Heights; Refugee

Keith Anthony Joseph "Lee" Jackson (born 8 January 1943) is an English bass guitarist known for his work in the Nice, a progressive-rock band, as well as his own band formed after the Nice, Jackson Heights, and finally Refugee with Nice drummer Brian Davison and Swiss keyboardist Patrick Moraz. Jackson plays bass left handed.

== Biography ==
Jackson was born in Newcastle upon Tyne.

Jackson first played with unknown bands, The Vondykes and the Invaders, then he found himself with The Hedgehoppers Anonymous in December 1965, replacing their bassist Ray Honeyball. He only stayed with this formation for a few weeks, before joining Gary Farr & The T-Bones in 1966. It was at this time that he met Keith Emerson, the band's pianist and organist. Then when the latter left to join the group The V.I.P's, future Art and Spooky Tooth, Jackson remained with the T-Bones until their dissolution at the end of 1966. The two met again later, to form a backing band for American singer P. P. Arnold, the band was called The Nice: she had been with the Ike & Tina Turner Revue, and was starting a solo career in England.

The Nice were formed by Emerson and Jackson, with guitarist-trumpeter David O'List and Ian Hague on drums, soon to be replaced by Brian Davison. Emerson left the band to form Emerson, Lake & Palmer in 1970; Jackson subsequently formed the band Jackson Heights with Charlie Harcourt on guitars, Mario Enrique Covarrubias Tapia on bass and Spanish guitars and Tommy Sloane on drums.

Jackson Heights disbanded after their first album King Progress in 1970. Jackson reformed the band, with keyboardist Brian Chatton (ex-The Warriors (British band) starring Jon Anderson and ex-Flaming Youth with Phil Collins) and John McBurnie on acoustic guitar and vocals. Michael Giles played drums on the next three albums, but the band toured as a trio without drums. On their last record, "Bump n' grind", Ian Wallace (also an ex-King Crimson) and Deep Purple's Ian Paice shared drums with Michael Giles.

Jackson went on to form the band Refugee, with drummer Brian Davison from The Nice and Swiss keyboardist Patrick Moraz. They released one album, Refugee (1974), before Moraz quit to join Yes.

After Refugee broke up Jackson formed Stripjack which toured for a short while at minor venues including in January 1977 the Rochester Castle in Stoke Newington, London.

Jackson and Davison reformed The Nice again with Emerson, accompanied by The Keith Emerson Band, for a tour of England in 2002; a live album Vivacitas was recorded and published that same year.

Lee Jackson has played bass in a New Orleans-style rock 'n' roll and jazz band, called the Ginger Pig, based in Northampton, for more than twenty years since returning to the UK. He also formed a small combo called 'Lee Jackson's Barking Spyders', with members of a Beatles tribute band called Accrington Stanley. He has a hoarse singing voice (which has frequently drawn criticism, notably from Emerson) and an almost percussive bass playing style.

== Discography ==
=== The Nice ===
Studio albums

- 1968: The Thoughts of Emerlist Davjack (Immediate)
- 1968: Ars Longa Vita Brevis (Immediate)
- 1969: Nice (Immediate)

Live albums

- 1970: Five Bridges (Charisma)
- 1971: Elegy (Charisma)
- 1996: America – The BBC Sessions (Receiver, 1996)
- 2001: The Swedish Radio Sessions (late 1967) (Sanctuary, 2001)
- 2002: BBC Sessions (Sanctuary, 2002)
- 2003: Vivacitas (Sanctuary, 2003)
- 2009: Live at the Fillmore East December 1969 (Virgin, 2009)

=== Jackson Heights ===
- 1970: King Progress (Charisma UK CAS 1018, CAS.1018 – Mercury US SR-61331)
- 1972: The Fifth Avenue Bus (Vertigo – 6360 067)
- 1972: Ragamuffins Fool (Vertigo – 6360 077)
- 1973: Bump n' Grind (Vertigo – 6360 092)

=== Refugee ===
- 1974: Refugee – Charisma Label
- 2007: Live in Concert Newcastle City Hall 1974. Newcastle City Hall 1974, Voiceprint label. Contains two songs from the Nice era, "The Diamond Hard Blue Apples of the Moon" and the Bob Dylan written song "She Belongs to Me" as well as songs from the studio album from Refugee.

== See also ==
- List of bass guitarists
- List of blues musicians
- List of people from London
- List of people from Los Angeles
- List of people from Newcastle upon Tyne
- List of rock musicians
- List of singer-songwriters
