= Patrick Moraz =

Swiss musician (born 1948)

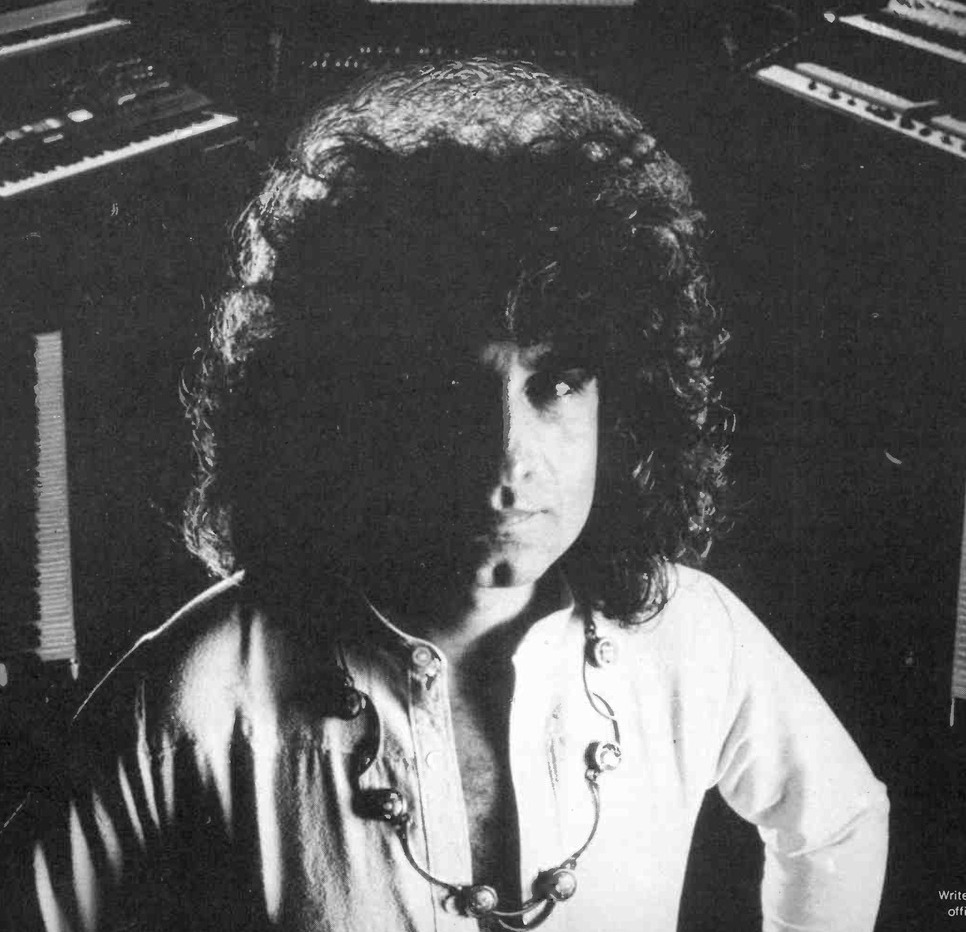
- Moraz in 1978

Background information
- Born: Patrick Philippe Moraz; 24 June 1948 (age 78); Morges, Switzerland
- Genres: Classical; jazz; progressive rock; jazz fusion; electronic
- Occupations: Musician; film composer; songwriter
- Instrument: Keyboards
- Years active: 1967–present
- Labels: Charisma; Atlantic; Passport; Carerre; i-Disk/Time Wave Music; Decca; Threshold; Polydor
- Formerly of: Mainhorse; Refugee; Yes; The Moody Blues; Vímana
- Website: patrickmoraz.net

Patrick Philippe Moraz (born 24 June 1948) is a Swiss musician, film composer and songwriter, best known for his tenures as keyboardist in the rock bands Yes and the Moody Blues.

Born into a musical family, Moraz learned music at a young age and studied at the Lausanne Conservatory. He began a music career in the 1960s as a jazz musician, performing with his quartet and quintet, groups that performed across Europe and won several awards. He formed the short-lived progressive rock group Mainhorse in 1969, and began work scoring films. In 1974, he formed another band, Refugee, and recorded one album before he joined Yes later the same year. Moraz was a member of Yes until 1976, and during this time he also started a solo career.

Moraz was a member of the Moody Blues from 1978 to 1991. Since then, he has worked on various solo projects.

== Early life ==
Moraz was born on 24 June 1948 on an aeroplane, though Morges, Switzerland, has been cited as his hometown. He was born in to a musical family; his father used to work for Polish pianist and composer Ignacy Jan Paderewski. He has a sister, Patricia. As a child, Moraz played the violin, piano, and percussion and wrote compositions for the piano at the age of five. He studied jazz and classical music until his development came to an abrupt halt at thirteen after he broke four fingers in a roller skating accident. He recalled, "I was told I could never play classical music again". Following a course of therapy and a considerable amount of practice with his left hand playing, Moraz was able to regain his technique, becoming ambidextrous in the process. Initially, Moraz wished to be an anthropologist and learned to speak Greek and Latin. Instead he chose to pursue music and studied in Lausanne at the Lausanne Conservatory, where he studied with Clara Haskil and, while in Paris, Nadia Boulanger. At sixteen, Moraz became the youngest person to receive the Best Soloist award at the Zürich jazz festival. Moraz went on to win awards at the festival, as a solo artist or in his jazz groups, for five consecutive years. In 1964, Moraz spent his summer in Cadaqués, Spain as a scuba diving instructor and spent time with Salvador Dalí at his property in Portlligat where he organised and performed at several gatherings for his guests.

At seventeen, Moraz's playing as a jazz soloist at a music festival earned him a prize of a collection of albums and some lessons with French jazz soloist Stéphane Grappelli who taught him "all I needed to know about jazz and rock". Moraz also spent time performing in several countries in Africa. In November 1964, Moraz left Switzerland for England, a place he always wanted to visit and perform. Not knowing the English language, he arrived in Bournemouth where he stayed for six months. Prior to his travels, Moraz's father offered him work as a chef in Switzerland in one of his kitchens that he managed, with the hope of using the skill to work in England. Moraz cooked at a school for a £2.88/hr salary, calling it "one of the hardest jobs I ever had". He played the piano in a local pub and tea room for more money. However, he was kicked out of the Musicians' Union because he took up employment as a bar pianist with an incorrect type of work visa. The director of the union then spotted him playing in a restaurant, causing Moraz to leave the country and cancel proposals to jam with a Bournemouth group, the Night People. He also worked by selling encyclopaedias in Geneva. In 1965, Moraz's quartet won an award at the Zürich jazz festival, and was soon invited to be the opening act for a European tour headlined by American saxophonist John Coltrane.

== Career ==
=== 1969–1974: Mainhorse and Refugee ===
Moraz returned to England in 1969 when he auditioned potential players for a new progressive rock band, Mainhorse. He wished for a drummer who could play like John Bonham, Buddy Rich, odd time signatures and the blues, and tried out "like 250 drummers" in the process. He settled with a line-up of Jean Ristori on vocals and bass, Bryson Graham on drums, and Peter Lockett on vocals and guitar. They signed with Polydor Records and recorded their only studio album, Mainhorse (1971), at De Lane Lea Studios, later purchased by Ian Gillan of Deep Purple in Kingsway, London. The album was not a commercial success, but the group secured work by performing at gigs in Germany. Moraz took up further work as a film composer on The Salamander (1971).

After touring Japan and Hong Kong as a musical director for a Brazilian ballet, Moraz returned to Switzerland in 1973. He recorded further film music for The Invitation (1973) and The Middle of the World (1974). In the summer, Moraz received a call from Lee Jackson, guitarist and singer of Jackson Heights, asking him if he was interested in joining Jackson Heights. Moraz had jammed with Jackson's previous band, The Nice, in 1969 when they played in Switzerland. Moraz refused, and counter-offered that they form a new band with former Nice member Brian Davison on drums. The band, Refugee, signed with Charisma Records and released Refugee (1974), written and arranged by Moraz and Jackson. The group developed a tight sound by practising for at least eight hours each day. Refugee supported the album with a tour.

=== 1974–1978: Yes and start of solo career ===
Upon his arrival from Geneva working on a film score for Gerard Depardieu, Moraz was asked to join Yes, following the departure of Rick Wakeman in May 1974. The band had begun work on Relayer (1974), their seventh album, in Virginia Water, Surrey, and sought potential replacements. Moraz had seen the band perform during their tour of Switzerland in 1969. After a try-out with Greek musician Vangelis, which proved unsuccessful following musical union issues and his unwillingness to travel, music reporter Chris Welch suggested to the band's manager, Brian Lane, that they ask Moraz. Though he regretted splitting with his Refugee bandmates, Moraz accepted the position as it was an opportunity that he thought would benefit his career, though he once said, "I felt it was time to leave". Moraz's audition occurred in the first week of August 1974 with Vangelis's keyboards, which were still set up in the rehearsal room. After tuning up, Moraz watched the band play the middle section of "Sound Chaser", which he said was "Absolutely unbelievable. To experience that – the truest surround experience I had ever encountered as an observer and listener". He was then asked to come up with an opening to it, and what he played ended up on the album.

After his successful audition, Moraz learned their repertoire across seven albums for the Relayer tour, which began in November 1974. When the tour ended in August 1975, Yes took an extended break so each member could produce a solo album. Charisma Records released Moraz's first album as a solo artist, which, due to its title consisting of a symbol which does not appear on standard keyboards, has since become commonly known as The Story of I (1976). Since working with the Brazilian ballet, he became interested in percussion and travelled to Colombia, Bolivia, Chile and Argentina for inspiration, and arrived in Brazil where he gathered "a very, very strong unit of 16 percussionists" to play on his album. Moraz invited synthesizer inventor Bob Moog to contribute sounds on the album; Moog accepted the task, and worked with him for several weeks. During this time Moraz also played on Steve Howe's album Beginnings (1975) and Chris Squire's album Fish Out of Water (1975). Moraz travelled to Brazil and incorporated Brazilian rhythms and musicians on The Story of I, giving it a world music flavour. Afterward he reconvened with Yes for their 1976 North American tour, where the band headlined several large concerts.

After the 1976 tour, Yes retreated from UK tax collectors to Montreux, Switzerland, to record their next album, Going for the One (1977). Some of the material had already been worked out by the time of their arrival; this included contributions to "Awaken", "Wonderous Stories" and "Parallels" from Moraz. However, during the early sessions, Moraz was told to leave in order to allow Wakeman to return to the band. Moraz spoke about his departure: "Even though, at the time, the split 'was not made to appear acrimonious', I suffered extremely and extensively. To be 'asked to leave' so suddenly put me in a lot of turmoil and disturbance ... I was never compensated for anything. I never ever got paid for any of my tour participation in the ... tour of 1976 ... I was entitled to a 20% cut from what the band was getting." In 2014, Chris Squire would suggest that a lack of a musical bond between Moraz and Steve Howe was the main artistic reason for Moraz and Yes parting company.

Moraz continued with his solo career and Charisma released his second album, Out in the Sun (1977), which he wanted to sound "completely different and more liberated". He then moved to Brazil for a year and a half, and prepared material for his third album. He wanted to title the album "Primitivization", but the record company chose to release it as Patrick Moraz (1978). During his time in Brazil, Moraz joined a Brazilian rock band, Vimana, with Lobão and Lulu Santos and Ritchie. He also recorded the keyboards in one of the most iconic songs of Brazilian music, "Avohai" by Zé Ramalho.

=== 1978–1991: The Moody Blues and solo projects ===
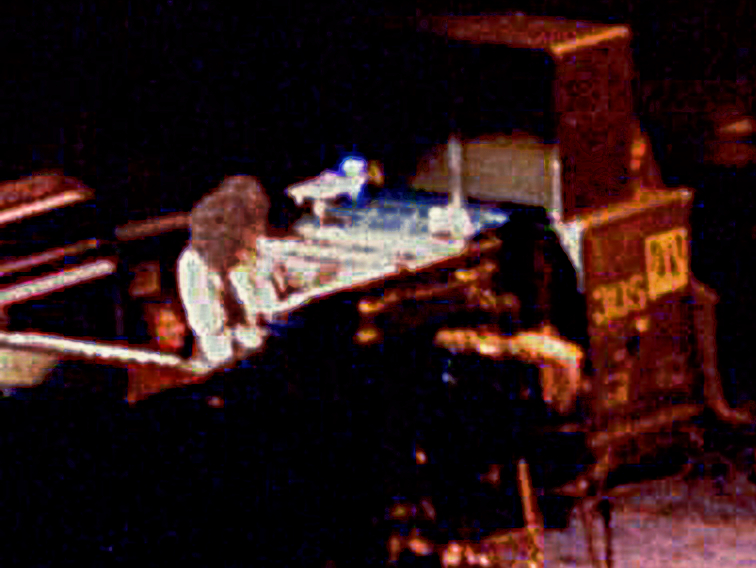
Moraz performing with The Moody Blues in 1981

In May 1978, Moraz visited a convention held by the Audio Engineering Society in Los Angeles, where Herbie Hancock taught him vocoder, and agreed to represent Aphex Systems in Brazil. On his way back to Brazil, Moraz stopped in Miami as he had some free time. At the hotel, he received a call asking him to join the Moody Blues after Mike Pinder left the band. Moraz proceeded to sing "Nights in White Satin" and "Tuesday Afternoon" on the phone, and accepted an audition in London in July 1978. Before his arrival, Moraz performed at the Montreux Jazz Festival with Brazilian musicians Airto Moreira and Gilberto Gil. The audition with the Moody Blues was successful, and Moraz "Got the gig that very afternoon".

Moraz toured with the Moody Blues in support of their eighth album, Octave (1978), which began in late 1978. Their next album, Long Distance Voyager (1981), became the band's biggest hit, reaching No. 1 in the US. This was followed by The Present (1983), The Other Side of Life (1986), and Sur la Mer (1988).

During his tenure with the Moody Blues, Moraz completed several solo projects. He toured with his group from Brazil, recorded with Chick Corea, and released two albums with drummer Bill Bruford as Moraz-Bruford. The two toured worldwide between 1983 and 1985. In May 1986, he worked on some "temporary cues" and "not the final scores" to the soundtrack to Predator (1987) and Wild Orchid (1989). The project gave him the opportunity to visit the filming of Predator in Mexico, and to meet Arnold Schwarzenegger and Mickey Rourke. However, Moraz could not fully complete the score for Predator because of an upcoming tour with the Moody Blues, leaving Alan Silvestri to compose the rest. He also operated Aquarius Studios in Geneva with Ristori. Moraz performed the score to The Stepfather (1987).

During the recording for Keys of the Kingdom (1991), Moraz was interviewed for Keyboard magazine. He expressed a feeling that The Moody Blues' music had become too confined and that the group had become stagnant, offering "no musical challenge". The other members, he thought, were unwilling to use his musical compositions and claimed his only composition during his 13 years with them was "half a song with the drummer". Before the Moody Blues toured the album, Moraz was fired from the band. In September 1991, Moraz sued the group for $500,000 as well as wrongful dismissal, claiming the group decided to split their profits four ways instead of five, and wished to be paid royalties he felt were owed to him as a full-time member of the band for almost 15 years. However, the group maintained Moraz was only a hired musician, despite his name being listed as a member on their albums and promotional materials and his appearing in official band photographs. On 28 December 1992, the jury in the case, aired on Court TV, awarded Moraz $77,175 from the defendants. Moraz had been offered $400,000 before the lawsuit.

=== 1991–present: Solo career ===
After his dismissal from the Moody Blues, Moraz has primarily concentrated on solo projects. His first of three piano albums, Windows of Time (1994), was recorded in a studio at Full Sail University in Florida. A total of fourteen hours of material was recorded which was cut to exactly one hour. Moraz then spent the next four years developing "hundreds of pieces of music for all instruments, as well as orchestras and choirs", producing several artists, and completed work for the Conference on World Affairs, of which he is an official delegate. He also wished to tour Windows of Time, but thought the style of the music would suffer in a traditional concert setting.

In late 1994, Moraz began a piano tour of the US and Europe with his Coming Home, America Tour (CHAT), which saw him perform at private or semi-private venues for an $800 flat fee, booked entirely by fans through the Internet. One show saw him perform for a couple in their home. The tour ended in November 1995 for a total of 92 performances. One of them was recorded and released as PM in Princeton (1995) for CD and video. In 1997, Moraz started work on a new album, A Way to Freedom, featuring arrangements for a symphony orchestra, percussionists, and a jazz brass band. The project remains a work in progress. From 1998 to 2000, Moraz worked almost exclusively on his second piano album Resonance (2000), which, like Windows of Time, was cut to exactly one hour of music. He also performed at a benefit concert at the request of poet José Ramos-Horta.

By 2001, Moraz had continued with several projects, including researching and preparing film scripts, including one for a potential film adaptation of The Story of I. He released his third piano album, the classically influenced ESP (2003), short for "Etudes, Sonatas and Preludes". In 2012, he issued a compilation of tracks from the three piano albums titled PianissiMoraz (2012).

In 2011, Moraz guested on an album by Panorama Syndicate entitled Skyline, playing piano on the title track.

In April 2014, Moraz took part in the annual progressive rock-themed cruise voyage Cruise to the Edge as a solo artist. In 2015, Moraz and drummer Greg Alban formed the Moraz Alban Project and released a studio album The M.A.P. Project (2015), featuring percussionist Lenny Castro, saxophonist Dave Van Such, bassists John Avila and Patrick Perrier, and Counting Crows bassist Matt Malley. Moraz and Alban met in 1983 and Alban played drums on Moraz's album Time Code (1984). The project was an Alban solo endeavour at first, with Moraz contributing to the music, but it grew to feature numerous other musicians with the music written around the drums and keyboards. In November 2015, Moraz released a limited edition 19-CD box set of his 18 albums, including Mainhorse (1971), The Story of I (1976) and the live album Music for Piano and Drums: Live in Maryland (2012).

Moraz took part in his second Cruise to the Edge voyage in February 2017.

Moraz reunited with Yes in July 2018. As part of Yes' 50th Anniversary tour, Moraz performed with Yes at two shows in Philadelphia, 20 and 21 July. At each show, Moraz played keys during the band's performance of "Soon". Moraz also appeared during the Yes FanFest before the 21 July show, at first performing a 70-minute solo piano show and then appearing on stage with Yes and taking part in a band interview.

== Personal life ==
Moraz lives in Florida with his second wife, Phyllis, and spends some time in his native Switzerland. He has one son, David, and a daughter, Rana, with first wife Diane.

== Discography ==
=== Solo career ===
Singles

- "Best Years of Our Lives"/"Cachaca (Baião)" (1976)
- "Tentacles"/"Kabala" (1977)
- "La Planete Inconnue"/"Nostalgie" (1979)
- "How Basic Can You Get?"/"Spirits" (1981)
- "L'Hymne De La Première"/"Grandeur Nature" (1987)

Studio albums

- The Story of I (1976)
- Out in the Sun (1977)
- Patrick Moraz (1978)
- Metamorphoses (1979)
- Coexistence (1980; reissued as Libertate in 1989)
- Time Code (1984)
- Future Memories II (1984)
- Future Memories I & II (1985)
- Human Interface (1987)
- Windows of Time (1994)
- ESP (2003)
- Resonance (2006)
- Change of Space (2008)

Live albums

- Future Memories Live on TV (1979)
- PM in Princeton (1995)
- Live at Abbey Road (2012)
- Moraz/Bruford: Music For Piano And Drums Live In Maryland (2012)

Compilation albums

- Future Memories I & II (2007)
- PianissiMoraz (2012)

DVD

- PM in Princeton (1995)
- Future Memories (2007)

=== With Mainhorse ===
- "More Tea Vicar"/"Basia" (1971)
- "La Salamandre"/"Juke Box" (1972; Single with the band Mainhorse, music from the film La Salamandre)
- Mainhorse (1971)
- The Geneva Tapes (2007)

=== With Refugee ===
- Refugee (1974)
- Live in Concert Newcastle City Hall 1974 (2007)
- Refugee & Refugee Live In Concert 1974 (2010)

=== With Yes ===
- Relayer (1974)
- "Soon"/"Sound Chaser" (1975)
- Yesshows (1980) - Keyboards on Ritual and Gates of Delirium
- The Word Is Live (2005) - Keyboards on 4 songs of Disc Two
- Yes 50 Live (2019) - Keyboards on Soon
- Keyboards on "Fish Out of Water" (Chris Squire’s solo album)
- Keyboards on "Beginnings" (Steve Howe’s solo album)

=== With The Moody Blues ===
- Long Distance Voyager (1981)
- The Present (1983)
- The Other Side of Life (1986)
- Sur La Mer (1988)
- Keys of the Kingdom (1991)

Compilation albums

- The Story of The Moody Blues (1989)
- Time Traveller (1994)

=== With Sons of Heroes ===
- Sons of Heroes (1983)

=== With Moraz-Bruford ===
- Music For Piano and Drums (1983)
- Flags (1985)
- Live in Tokyo (2009)
- Music for Piano and Drums: Live in Maryland (2012)

=== With Moraz Alban Project (MAP) ===
- M.A.P Project (2015)
