= Five Bridges =

1969 English progressive rock music album

Live album / Studio album by the Nice
- Released: June 1970
- Recorded: 17 October 1969 at Fairfield Halls, Croydon, London (except "Country Pie", live at Fillmore East, New York City, on 20 December 1969 and "One of Those People", a 1969 studio recording)
- Genre: Progressive rock
- Length: 45:20
- Labels: Charisma (UK); Mercury (US); Philips
- Producer: The Nice

The Nice chronology
Nice (1969)	Five Bridges (1970)	Elegy (1971)

Five Bridges is a live and studio album and the fourth album overall by the English progressive rock band the Nice, released in June 1970 by Charisma Records. Most of the album was recorded live in concert at Fairfield Halls in Croydon, London, in October 1969. The final track, "One of Those People", is a studio recording. The album's centrepiece is "The Five Bridges Suite", a five-part composition about Newcastle upon Tyne that features the group performing with the Sinfonia of London session orchestra conducted by Joseph Eger.

The album was a commercial success in the UK, peaking at number two on the UK Albums Chart. In the Q & Mojo Classic Special Edition Pink Floyd & The Story of Prog Rock, the album came No. 29 in its list of "40 Cosmic Rock Albums".

== History ==
The work was commissioned for the Newcastle Arts Festival and premiered with a full orchestra conducted by Joseph Eger on 10 October 1969 (the recorded version is from 17 October in Croydon's Fairfield Halls). The title refers to the city's five bridges spanning the River Tyne (two more have since been built over the river, including the Gateshead Millennium Bridge), and the album cover, by Hipgnosis, features an image of the Tyne Bridge.

The five movements are:

- "Fantasia" – orchestra with solo piano interludes by Keith Emerson
- "Second Bridge" – trio without orchestra
- "Chorale" – Lee Jackson's vocals with orchestra, alternating with piano trio interludes
- "High Level Fugue" – piano with accompanying cymbals
- "Finale" – a restating of the Second Bridge with additional jazz horn players.

Emerson used Walter Piston's well-known textbook on orchestration for the work. Emerson credits Friedrich Gulda for inspiring the High Level Fugue, which uses jazz figures in the strict classical form.

Also included on the Five Bridges album were live performances from the same Fairfield Hall concert of the Sibelius Intermezzo and a movement from Tchaikovsky's Pathetique Symphony. Both involved the orchestra playing the "straight" music juxtaposed with the trio's interpretations. Newly discovered material from this concert was later issued as part of a 3-CD set entitled Here Come The Nice.

The Five Bridges album also included a blending of Bob Dylan's "Country Pie" with Bach's "Brandenburg Concerto No. 6" (with a quote of Coleman Hawkins' jazz line "Rifftide" as well) and a studio recording of the original "One of Those People".

== Reception ==
Professional ratings
Review scores
Source	Rating
AllMusic	3/5 stars
TopTenReviews	9/15 stars

Paul Stump's 1997 History of Progressive Rock called the album "ill-conceived", commenting that the orchestrated pieces are poorly meshed, with the rock band and orchestra playing either separately (as on the first few movements of "The Five Bridges Suite") or such that "The textures of neither genre are properly utilized; it is like listening to two transistor radios simultaneously playing ..." However, he cited the final two tracks as among the Nice's best works, elaborating that "['One of Those People'] perhaps illustrates the Nice's real gift: to reduce pop forms to their constituent parts, alter their horizontal profile by cutting down paragraphs and overturning expected progression of chords and rhythm, which gives Emerson just as much of a chance to display his considerable technique without recourse to braggadocio." Mike DeGagne's retrospective review for AllMusic, in contrast, argued that "Intermezzo" and "Pathetique" "are marvelous examples of classical and rock commingling" and that throughout the album, "Each example of genre merging is pristine and fluid, making the actual overlapping of multiple styles completely transparent."

== Track listing ==
=== Side one ===
1. "The Five Bridges Suite" (Keith Emerson, Lee Jackson) – 18:06

- "Fantasia 1st Bridge"
- "2nd Bridge"
- "Chorale 3rd Bridge"
- "High Level Fugue 4th Bridge"
- "Finale 5th Bridge"

=== Side two ===
2. "Intermezzo 'Karelia Suite'" (Sibelius, Arr. Emerson, Joseph Eger) – 9:01
3. "Pathetique (Symphony No. 6, 3rd Movement)" (Tchaikovsky, Arr. Emerson, Joseph Eger) – 9:23
4. "Country Pie/Brandenburg Concerto No. 6" (Bob Dylan, Johann Sebastian Bach) – 5:40
5. "One of Those People" (Emerson, Jackson) – 3:08 (studio recording)
1990 CD Reissue

The 1990 CD reissue has 5 bonus tracks taken from 1972 compilation Autumn '67 – Spring '68. These are:

1. "The Thoughts of Emerlist Davjack"
2. "Flower King of Flies"
3. "Bonnie K"
4. "Diary of an Empty Day"
5. "America"

The original album is tracks 1 to 8. The bonus tracks are tracks 9 to 13. The "Five Bridges Suite" track numbers bear no relation to the music, and the sleeve notes bear no relation to the CD tracks.

Sleeve Notes

- "The Five Bridges Suite" – Tracks 1 to 8

CD Tracks

1. "Fantasia 1st Bridge/2nd Bridge" (2.42)
2. "Chorale 3rd Bridge" (3.27)
3. "High Level Fugue 4th Bridge" (4.01)
4. "Finale 5th Bridge" (7.59)

Actual Music

1. "Fantasia 1st Bridge" (6.11)
2. "2nd Bridge" (3.58)
3. "Chorale 3rd Bridge" (3.32)
4. "High Level Fugue 4th Bridge" (1.00)
5. "Finale 5th Bridge" (3.26)
This means that Track 3 is actually the 2nd Bridge and Track 4 contains 3rd Bridge, 4th Bridge (at 3.32) and 5th Bridge.

== Personnel ==
The Nice

- Brian Davison – drums, percussion
- Keith Emerson – keyboards
- Lee Jackson – vocals, bass guitar

with:

- Joe Harriott – saxophone
- Peter King – saxophone
- Chris Pyne – trombone
- Alan Skidmore – saxophone
- John Warren
- Kenny Wheeler – trumpet, flugelhorn
- The Sinfonia of London orchestra conducted by Joseph Eger

== Charts ==
Chart (1970–1971)	Peak position
Australian Albums (Kent Music Report)	28
Canada Top Albums/CDs (RPM)	83
German Albums (Offizielle Top 100)	25
UK Albums (Official Charts)	2
US Billboard 200	197
