= Jackson Heights (band) =

English musical group (1970–1973)

- Origin: England
- Genres: Progressive rock, folk rock, progressive folk
- Years active: 1970–1973
- Labels: Vertigo, Charisma
- Past members: Lee Jackson; Brian Chatton; John McBurnie; Charlie Harcourt; Tommy Sloane; Mario Enrique Covarrubias Tapia

Jackson Heights were a British progressive rock band from England. It formed in 1970 after The Nice organist and pianist, Keith Emerson, decided to leave the trio to form another band, Emerson, Lake and Palmer, leaving bassist-vocalist Lee Jackson and drummer Brian Davison on their own.

Thus Jackson then formed Jackson Heights, during their brief career which spanned four years they published four albums, King Progress, The Fifth Avenue Bus, Ragamuffin's Fool and Bump n' Grind. Brian himself formed the short-lived Brian Davison's Every Which Way, which released only one self-titled album, then joined Gong on tour. Lee Jackson and Brian Davison then reunited briefly with Swiss keyboardist Patrick Moraz as part of the trio Refugee which released only one self-titled album in 1974, before Moraz left to join Yes. Then in 2002 when Keith Emerson reformed The Nice for a short tour of a few concerts in England, Vivacitas a double live album, was then published.

== Origins ==
Keith Joseph Anthony Jackson, born 8 January 1943 in Newcastle, first played bass with unknown bands like The Vandykes and The Invaders. But it was when he replaced Stuart Parks in the Gary Farr & the T-Bones formation in 1965, that he met organist Keith Emerson. Then the two will meet again at the end of 1966 to help the singer P. P. Arnold, ex-Ike and Tina Turner Revue, by forming a group which accompanies her on tour at the express request of Andrew Loog Oldham manager of the Rolling Stones, with the ex-Mark Leeman Five drummer Ian Hague and trumpeter guitarist David O'List.

Hague would soon be replaced by Brian Blinky Davison, and the band would go by the name The Nice (the band's name came to them from a song by The Small Faces, "Here Come the Nice") and will soon be noticed for his flamboyant style. The real first name of Jackson being Keith, to avoid any confusion between him and Keith Emerson, he is then nicknamed Lee. A left-handed bass player like Paul McCartney, he distinguished himself by using the VOX V248 bass looking like a teardrop, on which he would sometimes use a bow to make it sound like a cello, on songs like Hang on to a Dream by Tim Hardin, My Back Pages by Bob Dylan or even Intermezzo from the Karelia Suite by Sibelius. But following Emerson's departure to join Greg Lake and Carl Palmer to found the trio Emerson, Lake and Palmer, The Nice disbanded and Brian Davison formed Brian Davison's Every Which Way who published a self-titled album, Jackson meanwhile goes up forming Jackson Heights. A band he wished to be more acoustic, to stand out as much as possible from the sound of The Nice. He will even leave the bass for the acoustic guitar for their first album, he will resume it later but the sound will always be lighter and less dominated by the organ.

== Band and beginnings ==
The first formation of the group includes, in addition to Lee Jackson on 6 and 12 string acoustic guitars, harmonica and vocals, Charlie Harcourt (who was later found with Lindisfarne among others) on acoustic and electric guitars, harpsichord, mellotron, organ, piano and vocals, Mario Enrique Covarrubias Tapia on bass and Spanish guitars and Tommy Sloane on drums. The group releases a first album King Progress for the record company Charisma in Great Britain which had published the last two albums of Nice, in America however their discs will be distributed by Mercury Records.

The group toured Great Britain and Europe during the spring and summer 1971 with an appearance on the program Pop 2 on the second French channel. But despite a revisited version of a Nice song, The Cry of Eugene with beautiful new arrangements, the King Progress album was a commercial failure. The group dissolved, leaving Jackson alone. However, he did not allow himself to become discouraged and reformed the group in a trio format, a formula which he knew well, this time by recruiting new musicians.

== Separation and reunion ==
After signing a new three-disc recording contract with Vertigo, Lee began looking for new musicians to reform the group. For the recording of the next album Fifth Avenue Bus, he recruits John McBurnie on vocals and acoustic guitar 12 strings, Brian Chatton on keyboards, ex-Warriors with Jon Anderson and ex-Flaming Youth with Phil Collins. At the start, Lawrie Wright was featured on the piano, but he fell ill and could not finish the recording. Wright was still able to record the piano parts on 3 songs; Long Time Dying, Sweet Hill Tunnel, House in the Country as well as writing the arrangements of Autumn Brigade alone. Dave Watts also played piano on the song Laughing Gear.

It is with their new band that Jackson Heights will endure until its final separation in 1973. On this album, we find Michael Giles ex-King Crimson on drums, but the trio will end up touring without a drummer. Once again, the disc did not meet the expected success, and the group is slow to take off. In the end, the leader decides that the group should return to the studio to prepare the next album.

== Jackson Heights Mark Two ==
Ragamuffins Fool is thus born, and the trio comes out of retirement to still tour without a drummer, on the album however we still find the talents of Michael Giles again on drums. A single will be taken from this disc, Maureen and John Mc Burnie begins to write more and more. There is also a new version of a Nice instrumental piece, Chorale (From Five Bridges Suite) rearranged by the group. Lee Jackson has often been criticized for his low and limited voice, but here on the other hand, the combined voices of the three musicians sometimes recall those of bands like America or Crosby, Stills, Nash and Young . But again, the album does not register big sales and Lee Jackson who supports the needs of the group becomes increasingly poor and disillusioned.

== Bump n' grind ==
But he decides to give his band one last chance and returns to the studio to record what will be the trio's last album, Bump n' grind. He had first planned a concept album, namely the life of the women who performed at the Burlesque Theater, but if the project is too ambitious to see the light of day, it will still be helped by an orchestra of 20 musicians in addition to drummers Michael Giles and Ian Wallace, the latter was also an ex-King Crimson, as well as Ian Paice of Deep Purple. The album, although supported by the Vertigo record company, which offered the group a luxurious cover, did not obtain the expected success. On this last album of the group, we find Keith Emerson on the programming of the Moog synthesizer, as well as Godfrey Salmon on the violin who was later found on the album Works Volume I by Emerson Lake & Palmer and who conducted the orchestra on the Works tour. We also found Godfrey arranging and conducting the orchestra on the soundtrack of the film Inferno, whose music was composed and played by Keith Emerson, the album released in 1980. Ditto for the album ' 'Nighthawks', still by Keith Emerson which was released in 1981.

== Refugee ==
On tour, the band could not recreate the sound of the orchestra, Jackson approached the Swiss keyboardist Patrick Moraz to offer him to join the formation. The latter refused the offer, but proposed to form a new group with him, having in his pocket an interesting sum of money and a record contract. Jackson then completely broke, accepted his offer and after contacting his former sidekick Brian Davison, the ex-Nice, dissolved Jackson Heights to form the short-lived Refugee which recorded a single studio album with Charisma. We will find John McBurnie later with Patrick Moraz, on three of his solo albums, The Story of I and Out in the Sun as well as Timecode in 1984.

== Future of the musicians ==
- Charlie Harcourt: played with Junco Partners, Cat Mother & the All Night Newsboys, Lindisfarne.
- Lawrie Wright: Released an album, Two for joy in 2012 with Jerelle Jacobs on double bass and Sophie Alloway on drums.
- John McBurnie: Vocals on The Story Of I, Out In The Sun and Timecode by Patrick Moraz, John has also done work as a session musician with, among others, Affinity, Camel, Crazy World Of Arthur Brown, Gerry Rafferty, Vapor Trails with Steve Holly and Vivienne McAuliffe.
- Brian Chatton: Before playing with Jackson Heights, started with The Warriors whose lead singer was Jon Anderson, then worked with the band Flaming Youth with drummer and vocalist Phil Collins. He then formed Boys Don't Cry which produced the album Don't Talk To Strangers in 1983 and the singles I Wanna Be A Cowboy in 1986 and Who The Am Dam Do You Think We Am in 1987. He also accompanied Eric Burdon on tour and released a few solo albums, including the first Playing for Time in 1981 with Phil Collins. Worked with Meat Loaf and the band Snafu.
- Michael Giles: First drummer for King Crimson on the first two albums, then a duet record with Ian McDonald entitled McDonald & Giles released in 1971 Then he plays on the album White Soul by Joël Daydé in 1972, he will then play as a session musician with Leo Sayer and Anthony Phillips, he will find his sidekick Ian McDonald on the solo album of the latter, Driver's Eyes from 1999. Michael recorded his own solo album in 1978 with his brother Peter Giles and Geoffrey Richardson, among others, entitled Progress and which would not be released until 2002.

== Band members ==
- Lee Jackson – electric bass, acoustic 6 and 12 string guitars, percussion, harmonica, lead vocals
- Charlie Harcourt – electric and acoustic guitars, keyboards, vocals (first album only)
- Mario Enrique Covarrubias Tapia – bass, Spanish guitars, vocals (first album only)
- John Woods – drums, percussion
- Tommy Sloane – drums, percussion (first album only)
- Brian Chatton – keyboards, vocals (last three albums)
- John McBurnie – acoustic 6 and 12 string guitars, Mellotron, keyboards, percussion, vocals (last three albums)

== Guests ==
- Chris Laurence – bass on Bump 'n' Grind
- Bill Bell – banjo on Bump 'n' Grind
- Michael Giles – drums, percussions on the last three albums
- Ian Wallace – drums, percussions on Bump 'n' Grind
- Keith Emerson – Moog programming on Bump 'n' Grind
- Ian Green : Orchestra conductor (on Bump 'n' Grind)
- Johnny Van Derrick : Violin soloist (on Bump 'n' Grind)
- Alan Travers, Andy Babynchuk, Cathy Wei, Clare Farmer, David Woodcock, Eddy Roberts, Liz Edwards, Gavyn Wright, Godfrey Salmon, Jeff Grey, Louise Jopling, Paul Pearce : Violins (on Bump 'n' Grind)
- Brian Hawkins, Brian Mack, Don McVay, Jan Schlapp : Violas (on Bump 'n' Grind)
- Helen Liebmann, Lynden Cranham, Martin Robinson, Mike Hurwitz : Cello (on Bump 'n' Grind)
- Billy Bell : Banjo (on Bump 'n' Grind)

== Discography ==
=== Studio albums ===
- King Progress (Charisma, 1970)
- The Fifth Avenue Bus (Vertigo, 1972)
- Ragamuffins Fool (Vertigo, 1972)
- Bump 'n' Grind (Vertigo, 1973)

=== Best of ===
- 1973 : Caravan And Jackson Heights – Pop Made in England (Pop 1) – Motors Records – MT 44019 (Contained two songs of Jackson Heights and four from Caravan)
- 1973 : Jackson Heights – Verve Records
- 1976 : Attention! Jackson Heights – Fontana Special

=== Singles ===
- 1970 "Doubting Thomas" / "Insomnia" (Charisma Records) JH 1 / JH 2
- 1970 "King Progress" / "Mister Screw" (Motors Records) MT 4 004
- 1972 "Maureen" / "Ragamuffins Fool" (Vertigo Records) 6059 077
- 1972 "Maureen" / "Long Time Dying" (Vertigo Records) 6059 068
- 1973 "Spaghetti Sunshine" / "Public Romance" (Vertigo Records) 6837 157
