= Refugee (band) =

British progressive rock group (1973–1974)

- Origin: London, England
- Genre: Progressive rock
- Years active: 1973–1974
- Label: Charisma
- Spinoff of: The Nice
- Past members: Lee Jackson; Brian Davison; Patrick Moraz

Refugee were a progressive rock band formed in 1973 by vocalist and bassist Lee Jackson and drummer Brian Davison (both ex-Nice members), after they met Swiss keyboardist Patrick Moraz. They released one album, Refugee (1974), and made several live tours. Refugee were preparing material for a second album when Moraz left the group in August 1974 to join Yes and the group subsequently dissolved.

== History ==
After Keith Emerson left The Nice to form Emerson, Lake & Palmer, Lee Jackson formed Jackson Heights, while Brian Davison formed Brian Davison's Every Which Way. After their fourth and final album Bump 'n' Grind (1973), Jackson Heights were looking for another keyboard player on tour, so Lee Jackson approached Patrick Moraz to ask him if he would be interested in joining. Moraz proposed forming a new band instead, and specifically with drummer Brian Davison, who had been in The Nice with Jackson. Gail Colson came up with the band name Refugee. The music press characterized Refugee as an attempted revival of The Nice. The three signed to Charisma Records, and developed a tight sound by practising up to eight hours each day. After a few months of this, Refugee played their first concert, at The Roundhouse in London on 2 December 1973.

Refugee recorded their only studio album, Refugee (1974), at Island Studios in London. The music was composed by Moraz, with lyrics from Jackson. Refugee supported the album with a tour.

Refugee began preparing material for a second album, and at least one song that would have been included on the album, "One Left Handed Peter Pan", was played in their later concerts. The group dissolved in August 1974, when Moraz accepted an offer to join Yes, as the replacement for the departing Rick Wakeman. At their final concert, held at The Roundhouse (like their debut) on 11 August 1974, Jackson announced that this would be their final performance since Moraz was leaving. Davison went on to work with Gong.

A live album, Live in Concert Newcastle City Hall 1974, was released in 2007. In 2019 a Refugee three-disc boxed set was released, compiling the band's studio album, the live album, and a BBC Radio One live recording.

== Discography ==
- Refugee (1974)
- Live in Concert Newcastle City Hall 1974 (2007)
