= The Nice =

English progressive rock band

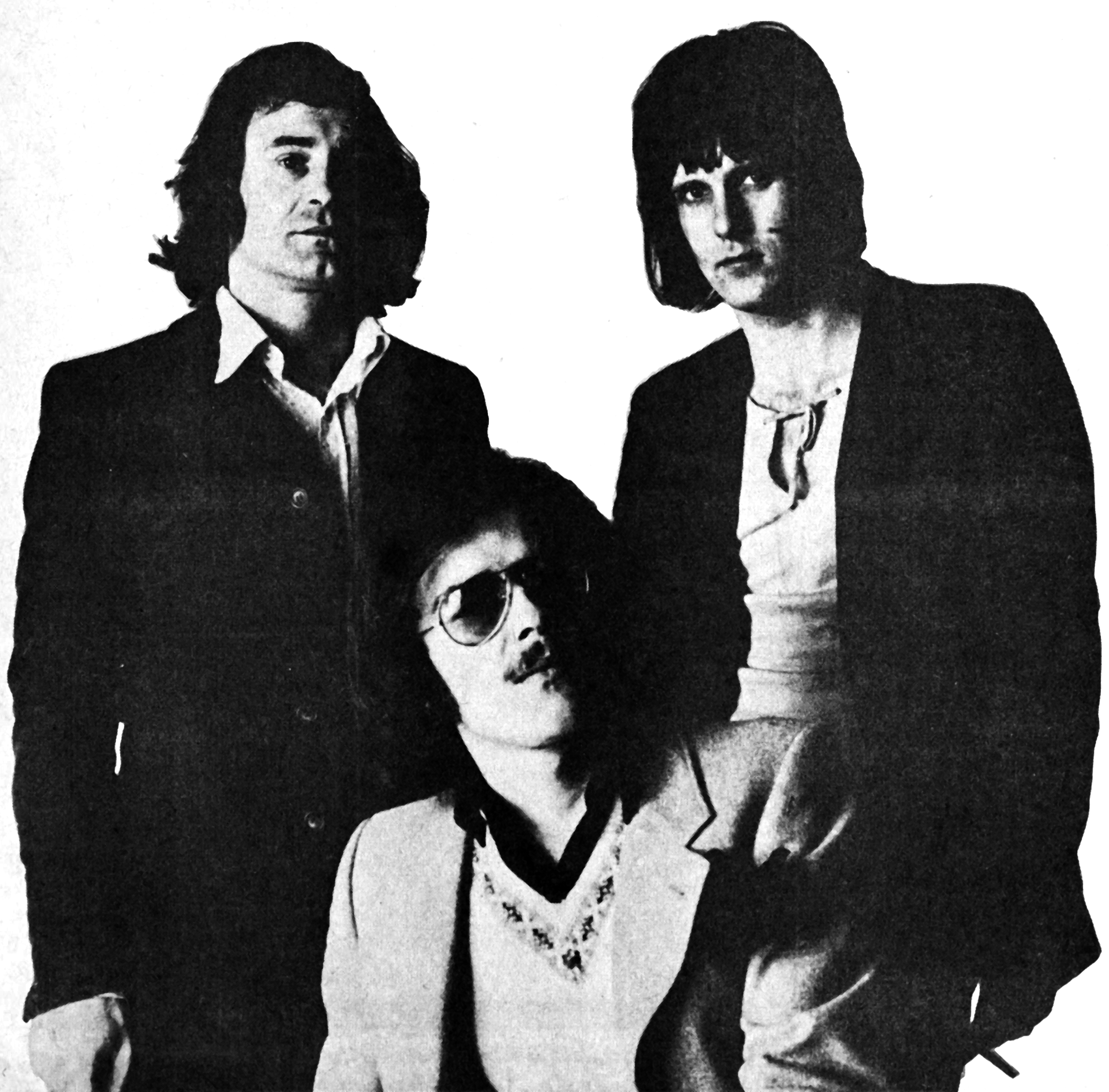
- The Nice, c. 1969. From left: Brian Davison, Lee Jackson, Keith Emerson.

Background information
- Origin: London, England
- Genres: Progressive rock; psychedelic rock; jazz fusion; art rock; proto-prog
- Years active: 1967–1970, 2002
- Labels: Immediate; Charisma
- Spinoffs: Emerson, Lake & Palmer; Refugee; Jackson Heights
- Spinoff of: P. P. Arnold
- Past members: Keith Emerson; Lee Jackson; David O'List; Ian Hague; Brian Davison

The Nice were an English progressive rock band active in the late 1960s. They blended rock, jazz and classical music and were keyboardist Keith Emerson's first commercially successful band.

The group was formed in 1967 by Emerson, Lee Jackson, David O'List and Ian Hague to back soul singer P. P. Arnold. After replacing Hague with Brian Davison, the group set out on their own, quickly developing a strong live following. The group's stage performances featured Emerson's Hammond organ showmanship and abuse of the instrument. Their compositions included radical rearrangements of classical music themes and Bob Dylan songs.

The band achieved commercial success with an instrumental rearrangement of Leonard Bernstein's "America", following which O'List left the group. The remaining members carried on as a trio, releasing several albums, before Emerson left the band in early 1970 in order to form Emerson, Lake & Palmer. The group briefly re-formed in 2002 for a series of concerts.

== History ==
=== Early career ===
The Nice evolved from Gary Farr and the T-Bones, which keyboardist Keith Emerson and bassist Keith "Lee" Jackson were both members of before the band dissolved in early 1967. Emerson then briefly played with the VIPs, who toured the Star-Club in Hamburg, and his playing style became influenced by the organist Don Shinn, including standing up to play the instrument and rocking it on stage. Meanwhile, P. P. Arnold, a performer who reached a higher level of popularity in the UK than her native US, was unhappy with her backing band, the Blue Jays, and wanted a replacement. Her driver suggested Emerson would be able to put together such a group. Emerson agreed, but only on the condition the band could perform on their own as a warm-up act. Since it effectively meant getting two bands for the price of one, manager Andrew Loog Oldham readily agreed. Emerson recruited Jackson, drummer Ian Hague and ex-the Attack guitarist David O'List, the latter by recommendation from journalist Chris Welch. The name came from Arnold saying, "Here comes the Naz", (Note: "The Naz" was African-American slang for Jesus and was the title of a monologue by comic Lord Buckley.) which the group misheard as "the Nice".

The band played its first gig in May 1967, and had its first major break at the seventh National Jazz and Blues Festival in Windsor on 13 August. Oldham had managed to secure a separate set for the group in a side tent away from also accompanying Arnold on the main stage, where they gained attention. The next week, Welch wrote in the Melody Maker that "it was the first time I had seen a group actually in the act of winning its first following in quite dramatic circumstances". When Arnold returned to the US shortly afterwards, Oldham offered the group a contract of their own. Hague was not interested in the "progressive" direction the group wanted to go in, so he was replaced by former Mark Leeman Five and Habits drummer Brian Davison.

Now a band in their own right, the Nice expanded their gear, recruiting roadies Bazz Ward and Lemmy, the latter of whom provided Emerson with a Hitler Youth ceremonial dagger to stick into the keys on his Hammond organ. They spent the end of 1967 on a package tour with Jimi Hendrix, Pink Floyd, the Move and Amen Corner. Pink Floyd's then leader, Syd Barrett, missed several gigs and O'List had to stand in for him. The group's first album was recorded throughout the autumn of 1967, and in October of that year they recorded their first session for John Peel's radio show Top Gear. The album included classical and jazz influences including extracts from Leoš Janáček's Sinfonietta and a rearrangement of Dave Brubeck's "Blue Rondo a la Turk" renamed as "Rondo", changing the time signature from the original 9/8 to 4/4 in the process. The group clashed with producer Oldham in the studio over the length of the track, but eventually won the argument; the full eight-minute piece was included on the album. After the album was released, the group realised that Oldham had a conflict of interest as manager and record company owner, so they recruited sports journalist Tony Stratton Smith to take over management duties.

For their second single, the Nice created an arrangement of Leonard Bernstein's "America" which Emerson described as the first ever instrumental protest song. The track used the main theme of the Bernstein piece (from West Side Story) but also included fragments of Dvořák's New World Symphony. The single concludes with Arnold's three-year-old son speaking the lines "America is pregnant with promise and anticipation, but is murdered by the hand of the inevitable." The new arrangement was released under the title "America (Second Amendment)" as a pointed reference to the US Bill of Rights provision for the right to bear arms. In July 1968, Immediate Records publicised the single with a controversial poster picturing the group members with small boys on their knees, with superimposed images of the faces of John F. Kennedy, Robert F. Kennedy and Martin Luther King Jr. on the children's heads. A spokesman for the band said: "Several record stores have refused to stock our current single .... the Nice feel if the posters are issued in United States they will do considerable harm". During the tour that followed the release of their second album in July, the group spawned controversy when Emerson burned an American flag onstage during a performance of "America" at a charity event, Come Back Africa in London's Royal Albert Hall. The group were subsequently banned from ever playing the venue again.

By summer 1968, the group had become concerned about O'List's reliability and matters came to a head following a gig in Croydon's Fairfield Hall in September. According to roadie Ward, O'List had an altercation with him mid-performance. Emerson subsequently called a band meeting with Jackson and Davison and stated flatly that O'List should be sacked. They agreed, and immediately after their performance at The Ritz, Bournemouth in October, he was fired by Stratton Smith with the rest of the band present. O'List, however, claims that he left the band voluntarily because he was upset at Smith's decision to make Emerson the front man, saying: "I left the band and waited for Keith to get in contact... I should have gone straight to Keith, but I didn't."

=== Reduction to a three-piece ===
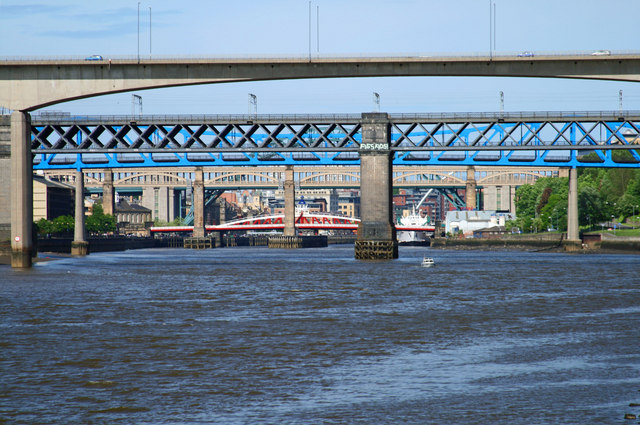
The title suite of the Five Bridges album was inspired by five bridges that span the River Tyne between Newcastle upon Tyne and Gateshead.

The Nice briefly considered looking for a replacement, with Steve Howe auditioning. Howe got on well with the rest of the band, but a week later had second thoughts and decided not to join. Emerson tried to learn guitar so he could cover some of O'List's old parts, but gave up after one gig.

The band's second LP, Ars Longa Vita Brevis, featured an arrangement of the Intermezzo from the Karelia Suite by Jean Sibelius, which the band's friend Roy Harper had recommended they cover, and the album's second side was a suite which included an arrangement of a movement from J.S. Bach's Brandenburg Concerto No. 3. The group used an orchestra for the first time on some parts of the suite. The band were on the bill at the 1969 Isle of Wight Festival and briefly toured Ireland with Yes and the Bonzo Dog Doo-Dah Band which, by all accounts, was fraught with logistical problems.

The third album, titled Nice in the UK and Everything As Nice As Mother Makes It in the US, featured one side recorded live on their American tour and one side of studio material. As with previous albums, it included arrangements of classical material, in this case Lalo's Symphonie espagnole which was rewritten as "Diary of an Empty Day" plus rearrangements of Bob Dylan's "She Belongs to Me" and Tim Hardin's "Hang On to a Dream".

In 1969, the band found time to contribute to other projects. Emerson performed as a session player for Rod Stewart and the Faces, while the whole group provided instrumental backing for the track "Hell's Angels" on Roy Harper's 1970 album Flat Baroque and Berserk. Mid-year, tour promoter Michael Emmerson asked the Nice to write some music for the Newcastle upon Tyne Arts Festival. The result was the Five Bridges suite. The group premièred the piece on 10 October 1969 at Newcastle City Hall. A complete version with an orchestra was performed at the Fairfield Hall, Croydon on 17 October, which was recorded for the album of the same name. The title refers to the city's five bridges spanning the River Tyne, and Jackson's lyrics refer to his Newcastle childhood and the St James' Park football ground.

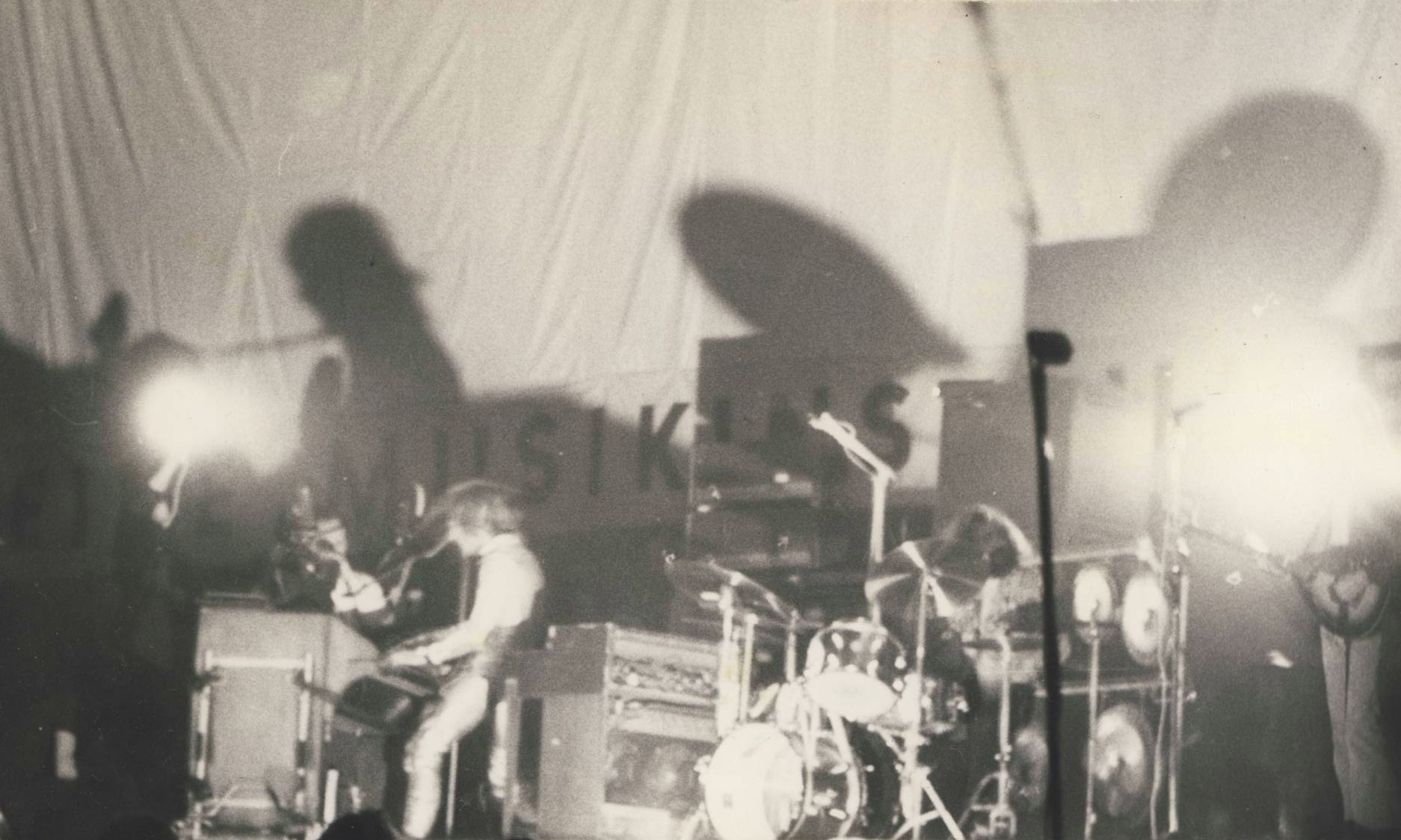
The Nice at the Ernst-Merck-Halle in Hamburg, West Germany on 28 March 1970

By late 1969, Emerson thought the Nice had progressed as far as it could musically, and was particularly dissatisfied with Jackson's limited vocal style. He asked Jack Bruce and Yes' Chris Squire about forming a new band, but both turned Emerson down. While on tour in the US with King Crimson, Emerson held a meeting with Stratton Smith and declared "the Nice had outlived its usefulness". By the end of the year, Emerson and Crimson's Greg Lake had decided to form a band together. The group carried on touring into 1970, but sometime early in the year, Emerson told Jackson that he would be leaving the band. Matters were not helped by Immediate Records filing for bankruptcy; the band later said they received no royalties from the label while an active group.

In February 1970, the group collaborated with the Los Angeles Philharmonic Orchestra led by Zubin Mehta. This was broadcast in the following month as part of the "Switched-On Symphony" program. Following standard television procedure of the day, the Nice's contribution (a version of "America") was recorded ahead of time and the band mimed for the cameras.

By March, the group had confirmed they would split, and a report on the band's decision was printed in Melody Maker. The group played their last British concert on 22 March at the Fairfield Hall, Croydon, and after a short German tour the band broke up, playing their last gig on 30 March at the Berlin Sportpalast.

=== Post-Nice and reunion ===
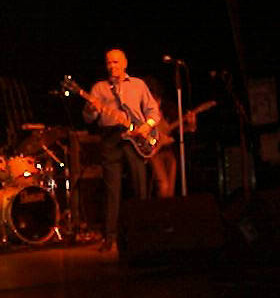
Lee Jackson performing at the 2002 reunion of the Nice.

Emerson and Lake recruited Carl Palmer from Atomic Rooster and formed Emerson, Lake & Palmer (ELP). In 1971, the posthumous Nice album Elegy was released. It included different versions of previously released tracks, two being studio versions and two live from the 1969 US tour. Emerson had no involvement with compiling the album, which was done by Jackson, Davison and Charisma Records. The album reached No. 5 in the UK.

Jackson formed Jackson Heights which released five albums between 1970 and 1973. Emerson supported the band and became a fan. Davison formed "Every Which Way" which released an album in 1970. Both Jackson and Davison formed Refugee with keyboardist Patrick Moraz in 1974, but Moraz left the group after one album to replace Rick Wakeman in Yes.

After over three decades of inactivity, the Nice reformed in 2002 for a series of concerts. A three-CD set Vivacitas was released, with the third CD being an interview with Emerson, Jackson and Davison. O'List did not attend the reunion and was replaced by guitarist Dave Kilminster (except for a preliminary gig at the 100 Club, where Phil Hilbourne played guitar on "America"/"Rondo"). Davison died on 15 April 2008 aged 65 in Horns Cross, Devon, from a brain tumour. Emerson died by suicide on 11 March 2016 in Santa Monica, California.

== Musical style ==
The Nice were primarily a live band. Their stage performances were bold and violent, with Emerson incorporating feedback and distortion. He manhandled his Hammond L-100 organ, wrestling it and attacking it with daggers (which he used to hold down keys and sustain notes during these escapades). Emerson's playing was inspired by Jimi Hendrix, Billy Ritchie of Clouds, and Don Shinn as well as earlier figures such as pianist Jerry Lee Lewis.

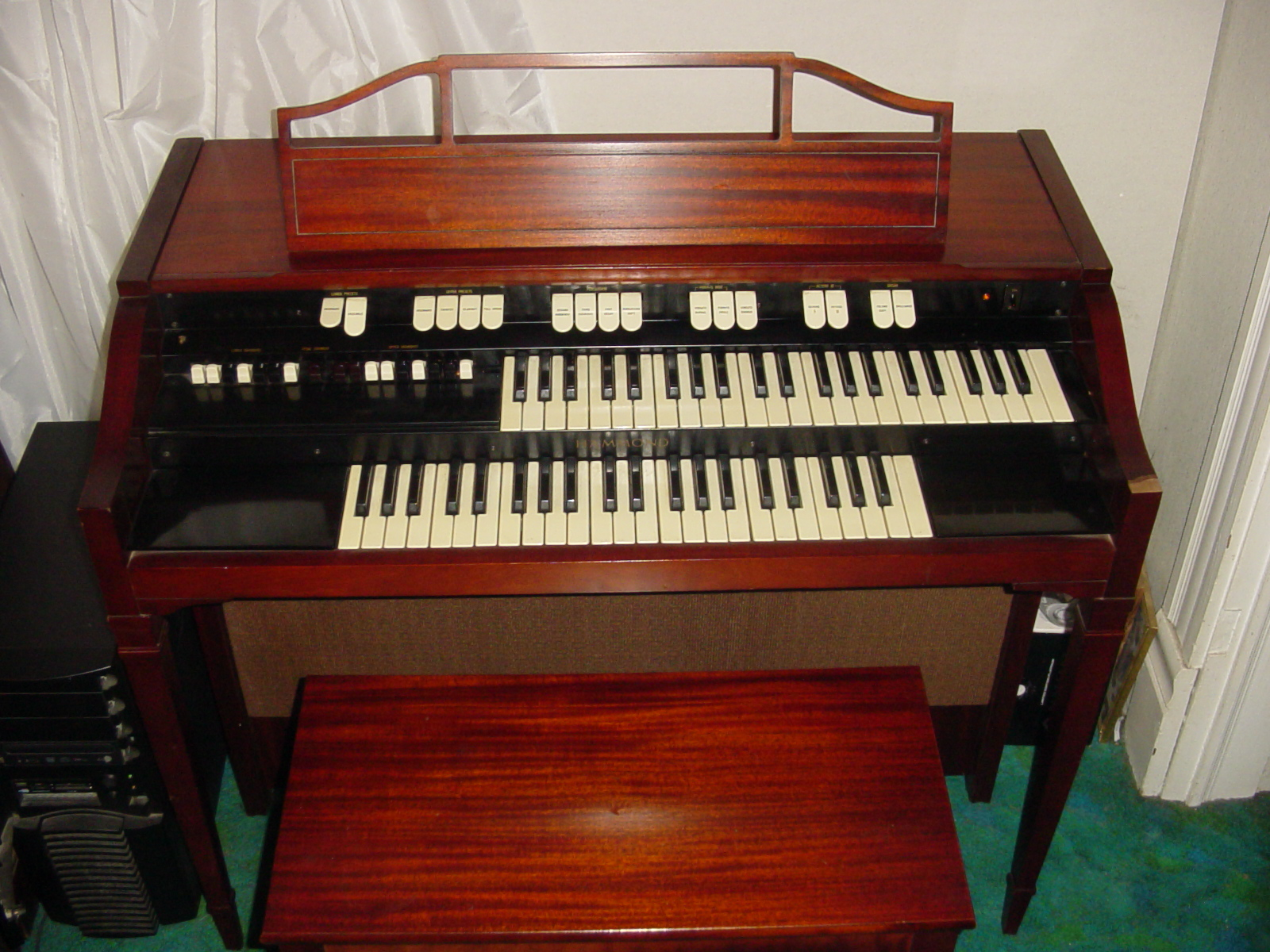
A Hammond L-100 organ similar to the one used by Keith Emerson with the Nice.

The Nice have been described as a progressive rock, psychedelic rock, jazz fusion, art rock, and proto-prog band. David Weigel writing in Slate described their rendition of Blue Rondo à la Turk, entitled "Rondo" and featured on their debut album, as "explosive freakbeat". Their early sound was geared more towards psychedelic rock with only occasional classical influences. Following O'List's departure, Emerson's control over the band's direction became greater, resulting in more complex music. The absence of a guitar in the band and Emerson's redefining of the role of keyboard instruments in rock set the Nice apart from many of its contemporaries. He used a combination of Marshall Amplification and Leslie speakers in order to project a full sound to compensate for the lack of a guitarist.

Jackson never considered himself a great singer, partly because the group chose poor keys for his vocal range, but his bass playing, with heavy use of a plectrum, was a distinctive part of the band's overall sound. He was influenced by Bob Dylan, whose songs were often covered at the time; the Nice interpreted several of them, typically reducing them to three or four verses and featuring a long improvised middle section, such as "She Belongs to Me".

== Legacy ==
"The Nice will be here when all the others are in Pantomime in Wolverhampton."

— John Peel

Though noted in rock history primarily as the band which brought Keith Emerson into the spotlight, the Nice were one of the pioneering progressive rock bands and their fusion of styles strongly influenced the movement into the 1970s. Their commercial success on Charisma Records was key to establishing the label, which went on to include several other progressive acts, including Genesis and Van der Graaf Generator. Genesis were fans of the Nice and "The Knife" from their album Trespass was directly inspired by the band. Though the Nice were not the first to combine a rock band and orchestra, they did inspire similar attempts by other groups, such as Pink Floyd's Atom Heart Mother.

Emerson's showmanship was more important in the Nice, and he mostly used just a Hammond organ live as opposed to a wider range of keyboards, including the Moog synthesizer, in ELP. John Peel, an early champion of the Nice, called ELP "a waste of talent and electricity".

== Members ==
- Keith Emerson – organ, piano, vocals (1967–1970, 2002)
- Keith "Lee" Jackson – bass, vocals (1967–1970, 2002)
- David O'List – guitar, vocals (1967–1968)
- Ian Hague – drums, percussion (1967)
- Brian Davison – drums, percussion (1967–1970, 2002)

=== Touring members ===
- Dave Kilminster – guitar (2002)

== Discography ==
=== Studio albums ===
- The Thoughts of Emerlist Davjack (Immediate, 1968)
- Ars Longa Vita Brevis (Immediate, 1968)
- Nice (aka Everything As Nice As Mother Makes It) (Immediate, 1969) – [UK No. 3]

=== Live albums ===
- Five Bridges (Charisma, 1970) – [UK No. 2]
- Elegy (Charisma, 1971) – [UK No. 5]
- America – The BBC Sessions (Receiver, 1996)
- The Swedish Radio Sessions (late 1967) (Sanctuary, 2001)
- BBC Sessions (Sanctuary, 2002)
- Vivacitas (Sanctuary, 2003)
- Live at the Fillmore East December 1969 (Virgin, 2009)
- Vivicitas: Live At Glasgow 2002 (Sanctuary 2003)

=== Compilation albums ===
- Autumn '67 – Spring '68 (Charisma, 1972, UK), released as Autumn to Spring (Charisma, 1973, US)
- The Best of The Nice – Remastered (Castle Communications) 1998, UK

=== Singles ===
- "The Thoughts of Emerlist Davjack" / "Azrial (Angel of Death)" (Immediate IM 059, November 1967)
- "America" / "The Diamond Hard Blue Apples of the Moon" (Immediate IM 068, 21 June 1968) – [UK No. 21]
- "Brandenburger" / "Happy Freuds" (Immediate IM 072, 8 November 1968) – [UK / Europe]
- "Hang on to a Dream" / "Diary of an Empty Day" (Immediate, 1969) – [Europe]
- "Country Pie" / "One of Those People" (Charisma, 1969)
