= David O'List =

British rock musician

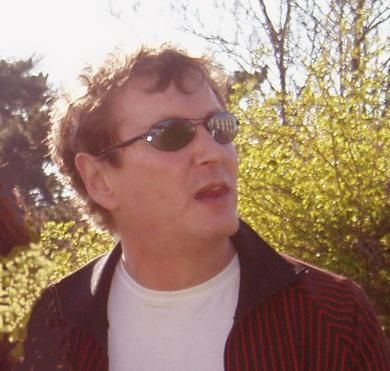
- O'List in 2009

Background information
- Also known as: David Orgelist
- Born: 13 December 1948 (age 77)
- Origin: Chiswick, West London, England
- Genres: Rock, glam rock
- Instruments: Guitar, vocals, trumpet
- Years active: 1960s–present
- Labels: Decca, CBS
- Website: davyolist.wordpress.com

David O'List (born 13 December 1948) is an English rock guitarist, vocalist and trumpeter. He has played with The Attack, The Nice, Roxy Music (before being replaced by Phil Manzanera), and Jet (replaced by Ian Macleod). He also briefly deputised in Jethro Tull and Pink Floyd.

== Career ==
O'List (using the name David John) started The Attack in 1966. Managed by Don Arden, they released four singles: "Try It"/"We Don't Know" (Decca F 12550), "Hi Ho Silver Lining"/"Anymore Than I Do" (Decca F 12578), "Created By Clive"/"Colour Of My Mind" (Decca F 12631) and "Neville Thumbcatch"/"Lady Orange Peel" (Decca F 12725).

=== The Nice ===
O'List was picked by Andrew Loog Oldham as guitarist for The Nice with organist and pianist Keith Emerson, bassist and singer Lee Jackson and drummer Ian Hague (later replaced by Brian Davison), then a backing band for P. P. Arnold, and left The Attack in February 1967. By May the band was gigging in its own right and appeared at the National Jazz and Blues Festival that summer; their first album, however, did not appear until early 1968. Their only hit single, a re-worked version of Leonard Bernstein's "America", reached number 21 in the UK in July of that year. O'List's style in The Nice was described by Bruce Eder of Allmusic as "Hendrix-ish guitar ... in sharp relief." However, with two strong instrumentalists competing, O'List left The Nice in autumn 1968 during the recordings for their second album.

While with The Nice, O'List briefly substituted for Syd Barrett in Pink Floyd in 1967. "That was incredible," he recalled fifty years later. "It felt like a dream because it was on Floyd's package tour with Jimi Hendrix. I knew Floyd's music really well – so, when they asked me to play with them, it was quite easy." Asked if the Floyd considered him as a permanent replacement for Barrett, he said: "Apparently they gave it some thought. They certainly came to see me play live a few times, but I was only nineteen and still quite green in the business. I should have pushed myself more."

=== After the Nice ===
O'List also played briefly in Jethro Tull after the departure of Mick Abrahams.

In early 1970 O'List provided guitar and bass for The Misunderstood and then Roxy Music between October 1971 and February 1972. He played in the band's first BBC session in January 1972, before leaving the group.

O'List reunited with Roxy Music vocalist Bryan Ferry in 1974 as one of the guitarists on Ferry's second solo album, Another Time, Another Place. Ferry's hit cover of "The 'In' Crowd" featured an O'List guitar solo. After Roxy Music, O'List joined Jet in 1974. They released one album in 1975 and toured as support to Hunter-Ronson. An O'List song was released as their first single My River. As Jet morphed into Radio Stars, O'List was replaced.

=== Solo career ===
O'List released a solo album in 1997, entitled Flight of the Eagle. His second solo release Second Thoughts was released in 2015 and reissued in 2021.
