= America (West Side Story song) =

Song from the musical West Side Story

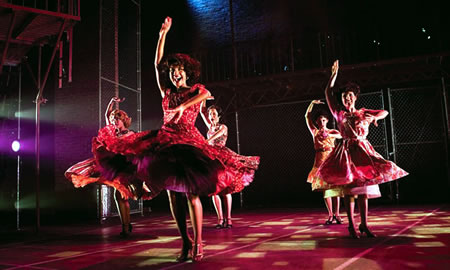
Shark girls in "America", Portland Center Stage production, 2007

"America" is a song from the 1957 musical West Side Story. Stephen Sondheim wrote the lyrics and Leonard Bernstein composed the music.

== Content ==
In the original stage version, Anita – the girlfriend of Bernardo, the leader of the Sharks, and the most important female character after Maria – praises America while a fellow Puerto Rican, Rosalia, supports Puerto Rico. This version of the song deprecates the island and highlights the positive qualities of American life ("I'll drive a Buick through San Juan/If there's a road you can drive on"). The irony of this supposedly pro-American number, however, is its vibrantly Hispanic musical style, with Latin percussion, complex cross-rhythm and Spanish guitar.

In the 1961 film version, Anita, played by Rita Moreno, still sings in favor of the United States while Bernardo, played by George Chakiris, replies with corresponding criticisms of America and American ethnic prejudice, especially against Puerto Ricans ("Life is alright in America/If you're all White in America"). Some of the original song's disparagement was removed. In 2004, this version finished at No. 35 in AFI's 100 Years...100 Songs survey of top tunes in American cinema.

The 2021 film version of the song, sung by Ariana DeBose as Anita, David Alvarez as Bernardo, Ana Isabelle as Rosalia and Ilda Mason as Luz, is a hybrid of both the stage and 1961 film versions, except now taking place the morning after the dance at the gym, and in the streets of the Puerto Rican community's area of the city. This film's version of the song was nominated for Best Scene at the 2021 St. Louis Gateway Film Critics Association Awards and for Best Musical Moment at the 2022 MTV Movie & TV Awards. In June 2026, CBS News included the song in its list of the 250 essential American songs of the past 250 years.

The song employs a mixed meter:

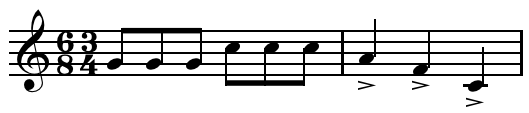
"I like to be in A-mer-i-ca" from West Side Story.

Original Broadway Cast – "America" (1957)
A 28-second sample from the original Broadway cast recording of West Side Story

The alternating bars of 6/8 (six eighth-notes in two groups of three) with 3/4 (three quarter-notes) (similar to a guajira) is a distinctive characteristic of the song. This rhythm has been called both a hemiola and a habanera but is not really either. The two bar types alternate and are not superposed, as in a hemiola. The alternation is comparable with the "Habanera" from "Carmen", but "America" lacks the distinctive characteristic underlying rhythm of the habanera form.

Stephen Sondheim claims that Bernstein returned from a holiday in Puerto Rico and told him he had come across a wonderful dance rhythm called Huapango which gave him the idea for the song. Many years later, a friend of Sondheim's found, in a box of Bernstein's papers, an unproduced ballet called Conch Town which contained the tune. Sondheim concludes that Bernstein had invented the story of finding the rhythm on holiday simply so he could reuse an old tune.

The composer's tempo instruction is "Tempo di Huapango".

== Cover versions ==
- An instrumental version, with the signature rhythm reduced to a uniform 4/4, was released in 1963 by Herb Alpert's Tijuana Brass on their album Volume 2.
- Trini Lopez covered "America" in 1963 for his first album Trini Lopez at PJ's.
- In 1968, The Nice, featuring Keith Emerson, covered an instrumental version of "America" as the band's second single. This version had the main theme playing against a straight 4/4 beat, also including pieces of Dvořák's New World Symphony, then changing in the middle to 6/8 for improvised guitar and organ solos. At a July 7, 1968, concert at the Royal Albert Hall, the band controversially burned an American flag after performing the song. Emerson later folded the melody into a great many of his jams including the finale medley on Emerson, Lake & Palmer's 1992-1993 tours, which also used musical themes from "Blue Rondo à la Turk", a jazz standard composed by Dave Brubeck. An example of this medley can be found on the album Live at the Royal Albert Hall.
- The English psychobilly band King Kurt covered this song on an EP called America, released in 1986.
- Dr. Teeth and the Electric Mayhem performed an instrumental rendition on a 1979 episode of The Muppet Show before being interrupted by various Muppets from other countries.
- A version of this song was performed by the in-house band and singers to introduce a 2012 episode of the Polish version of Name That Tune, Jaka to Melodia?, complete with a set of dancers.
- This song was also used in an episode of Glee (season 3 episode 5: "The First Time"), and sung by Naya Rivera (as Santana Lopez) in the role of Anita, and Mark Salling (as Noah "Puck" Puckerman) in the role of Bernardo.
- The progressive rock band Yes' cover of Simon & Garfunkel's "America", bassist Chris Squire quotes the West Side Story song near the conclusion of their instrumental intro.

== Usage in popular culture ==
- A theme from "America" was referenced by John Williams for his celebratory For New York, composed in 1988 for Bernstein's 70th birthday gala.
- In 1989, a verse of the song was sampled in Big Audio Dynamite's single "James Brown" with a 4/4 beat underneath.
- In 2003, the song was used in advertisements for Admiral Insurance though with different lyrics.
- In 1994, the song was the unofficial anthem at the 1994 FIFA World Cup in the United States and was sung by the Three Tenors (Plácido Domingo, José Carreras and Luciano Pavarotti) at Dodgers Stadium in Los Angeles to an estimated global TV audience of 1.3 billion viewers. The BBC also used it as its theme for its coverage of the World Cup.
- A version of the song with truncated lyrics is used in the end credits of the 2018 film Vice.
- In 1991, Metallica interpolated the chorus as the intro of their song 'Don't Tread On Me". The "America" melody again featured prominently in a 1986 jam with Paul Shaffer on Late Night with David Letterman.
- The Simpsons released a short titled "West Wing Story" that featured a parody of the song performed by Donald Trump and The Squad.
- The song is parodied during a medley of Broadway songs in Saturday Night Live's 2020 sketch "Airport Sushi" about New York City's LaGuardia airport, performed by John Mulaney, Cecily Strong, and Kenan Thompson.
