= Brian Davison (drummer) =

British drummer (1942–2008)

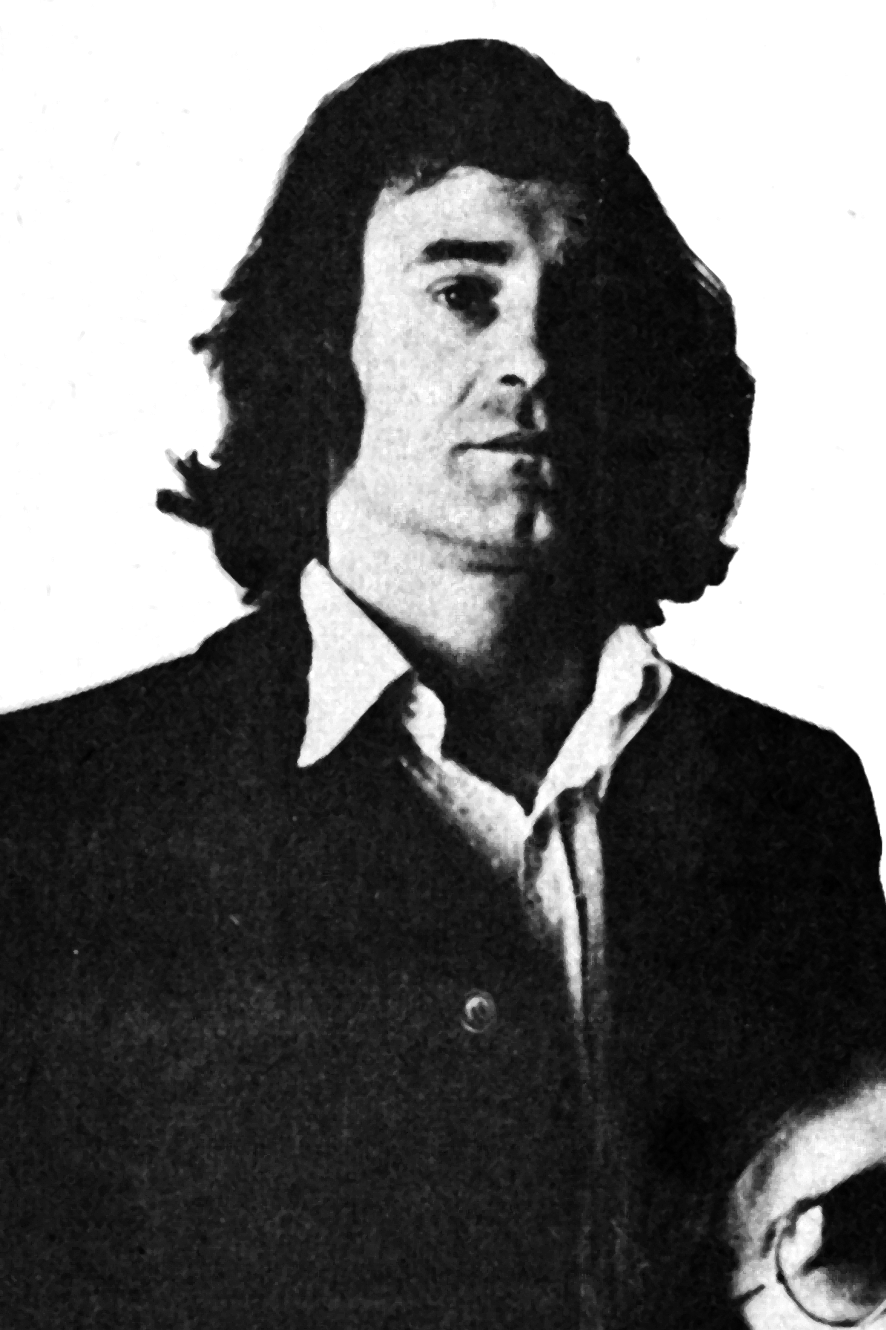
- Davison as a member of The Nice, c. 1969

Background information
- Also known as: "Blinky"
- Born: 25 May 1942; Leicester, England
- Died: 15 April 2008 (aged 65) Horns Cross, Bideford, Devon, England
- Genres: Progressive rock
- Occupation: Musician
- Instrument: Drums
- Years active: 1950s(?)–2008
- Formerly of: Mark Leeman Five; The Nice; Brian Davison's Every Which Way; Refugee; Gong

Brian Davison (25 May 1942 – 15 April 2008), was a British musician. He is best known for playing drums with The Mark Leeman Five, The Nice, Brian Davison's Every Which Way, Refugee and Gong.

== Biography ==
Towards the end of the 1950s, Davison played in various skiffle groups in small clubs in the north-west of London. He joined The Mark Leeman Five in 1963, with Mark Leeman on vocals, Alan Roskams on guitar, Dave Hyde on bass and Terry Goldberg on piano. They recorded a series of singles during their career as well as an album published in 1963, Rhythm and Blues Plus!, which contains among others, a song by Willie Dixon, "You Can't Judge a Book by Its Cover", and one from Muddy Waters, "Got My Mojo Working", as well as other pieces from rhythm and blues. In 1965, after Leeman died in a car accident, the band members recruited another singer Roger Peacock and the band continued until 1966 before disbanding.

Davison, guitarist/vocalist Brian Wilson (not to be confused with the former member of the Beach Boys) and a bassist then formed the trio The Habits, who released a single "Elbow Baby", produced by Spencer Davis. This group came to France and played in Marseille (in a small ephemeral club L'Elbow) and in Cogolin at La Jasse.

Brian Davison then formed the psychedelic band Shinn with Donald "Donn" Shinn on keyboards, Paul Newton on bass (future member of Uriah Heep) and singer Eddie Lamb. They played live, but did not release any records. Then, in 1967, Davison replaced drummer Ian Hague in a new band, The Nice, with ex-Gary Farr & The T-Bones Keith Emerson on organ and piano and Keith "Lee" Jackson on bass and vocals, as well as guitarist/trumpeter David O'List, ex-member of The Attack. They released their first album in 1967 on the Immediate Records label, entitled The Thoughts of Emerlist Davjack, based on the musicians' names.

After a second album, Ars Longa Vita Brevis in the vein of the first, which saw the departure of guitarist O'List, The Nice continued as a trio until it broke up in 1969 when Emerson, seeking to broaden his horizons, disbanded the group and formed the trio Emerson, Lake & Palmer.

=== Brian Davison's Every Which Way ===
Brian Davison then founded another group, Brian Davison's Every Which Way, and released an eponymous album on the Charisma label in 1970, with Graham Bell on vocals, acoustic guitar and electric piano, John Hedley on electric guitar, Alan Cartwright on bass, Geoffrey Peach on flute, horns and backing vocals, and Brian himself on drums. In a rhythm and blues and free jazz vein, the album contains the long blues "Bed Ain't What It Used to Be", but goes unnoticed and, due to low sales, the group split up. Davison is then forced to play with small unknown formations. He plays for Wolfgang Dauner, then does a few sessions as a studio musician. He thus played with former Nice colleagues Keith Emerson and Lee Jackson on an album by Roy Harper, Flat, Baroque & Berserk in 1970, on the piece "Hell's Angels".

He did it again in 1973, appearing on Roy Harper's album Lifemask, on which he played on the long suite "The Lord's Prayer". Jackson, for his part, formed his own group Jackson Heights after the dissolution of The Nice, and after their fourth album Bump n' Grind, approached the Swiss keyboardist Patrick Moraz about joining the band. Moraz refuses and proposes instead to form a new group, Refugee. Moraz, Jackson and Davison thus came together for an eponymous album produced in 1974. They did a few concerts, but Moraz then auditioned for the group Yes and left the trio; British keyboardist Graham Bond was considered a possible replacement, but after an audition the combination proved impractical. Davison played with the band Gong on tour for a while before scraping by again with small local bands.

=== The Nice reunion ===
In 2002, Keith Emerson reformed The Nice with Lee Jackson, Brian Davison and guitarist Dave Kilminster, augmented for a few songs by Phil Williams on bass and Pete Riley on drums. A tour of England followed and a live album Vivacitas was released in 2003, with songs from The Nice including the double "America/Rondo" and "Karelia Suite". Also included are pieces by Emerson, Lake & Palmer, such as "Tarkus" and "Fanfare for a Common Man.

Davison taught drumming at Bideford College. He died of a brain tumour on 15 April 2008 at home in Horns Cross, Bideford, Devon, aged 65.

== Discography ==
=== Mark Leeman Five ===
==== Singles ====
- 1965 : Portland Town/Gotta get myself together : Columbia – DB 7452
- 1965 : Blow my blues away/On the horizon : Columbia – DB 7648
- 1966 : Forbidden Fruit/Going To Bluesville : Columbia – DB 7812
- 1966 : Follow me/Gather Up The Pieces : Columbia – DB 7955 Promo Single

==== Album ====
- 1963 : Rhythm and Blues Plus! : serial number unknown

==== Compilations ====
- 1971 : Rock Generation Volume 8 – Soft Machine at the Beginning – Mark Leeman Five And Davy Graham : Byg Records – 529.708
- 1991 : The Mark Leeman Five – Memorial Album : See For Miles Records Ltd. SEE CD 317 – Available on CD

=== Studio albums ===
- 1968: The Thoughts of Emerlist Davjack (Immediate)
- 1968: Ars Longa Vita Brevis (Immediate)
- 1969: Nice (Immediate)

=== Live albums ===
- 1970: Five Bridges (Charisma)
- 1971: Elegy (Charisma)
- 1996: America – The BBC Sessions (Receiver)
- 2001: The Swedish Radio Sessions (Sanctuary)
- 2002: BBC Sessions (Sanctuary)
- 2003: Vivacitas (Sanctuary)
- 2009: Live at the Fillmore East December 1969 (Virgin)

=== Singles ===
- 1967 : The Thoughts of Emerlist Davjack / Azrael (Angel of Death) (Immediate)
- 1968 : America / Diamond Hard Blue Apples of the Moon (Immediate, 1968)
- 1968 : Brandenburger / Happy Freuds (Immediate)
- 1969 : Diary of an Empty Day / Hang On to a Dream (Immediate)
- 1969 : Country Pie / Brandenburg Concerto No. 6 / One of Those People (Charisma)

=== Compilations ===
- Hang on to a dream – Esperar un sueno (Emidisc 1C 048-50 722 – 1970)
- The Nice (Phillips 9299 718 – 1970)
- The best of The Nice (Immediate 1C 048-90 674 – 1970)
- Keith Emerson with the Nice (Mercury – 830 457-2 M-1 – 1971) Include albums Five Bridges Suite and Elegy
- Keith Emerson with the Nice Vol 2 (Fontana 9286 862 1971)
- In memoriam (Immediate 2C 054 – 95954 – 1972)
- Autumn '67 – Spring '68 (Charisma, 1972, UK) Reedited under the title : Autumn to Spring (Charisma, 1973, USA)
- The Immediate Story (Double CD – Sire SASH – 37102 – 1975)
- Amoeni Redivivi (Immediate IML1003 – 1976)
- Greatest Hits (Immediate IML 2003 – 1977)
- Ars Longa Vita Brevis (3 LP Box – Charly Records 26 76 210 – 1977)
- The Immediate Years (3 LP Box – Charly Records CDIMMBOX2 – Charly Schallplatten GmbH – 1995 Germany)
- Nice Hits Nice Bits (BMG Fabricated, 1999)
- The Immediate Collection (Recall Records – 1999 Double CD Album)
- Here Comes The Nice The Immediate Anthology (3CD Castle Music – CMETD 055 – 2000)
- Keith Emerson & The Nice Absolutely The Best (True North 1003941 – 2001)
- BBC Sessions – Ian Hague on drums on Flower King Of Flies, Sombrero Sam and Rondo recorded for the television show Top Gera.
- Artistes Variés – Immediate Pleasure - Including Rod Stewart and P.P. Arnold, Come home baby and two songs from The Nice, The Thoughts of Emerlist Davjack and America (2002).
- The best of The Nice, The Small Faces. Humble Pie, Eric Clapton & John Mayall (Immediate – 1C 148-92 661/662) Double Album
- The Nice & The Humble Pie*- Famous Popgroups Of The '60s Vol. 4 (Music For Pleasure – 1M 146-94319/20) – CD 1 The Nice – CD 2 Humble Pie) Double Album

=== Brian Davison's Every Which Way ===
- 1970 : Brian Davison's Every Which Way

=== Refugee ===
- 1974 : Refugee
- 2007 : Live in Concert Newcastle City Hall 1974
- 2010 : Refugee & Refugee Live in Concert 1974 Both albums were reedited on Floating World Records.

=== Collaborations ===
Roy Harper

- 1970 : Flat, Baroque & Berserk – The Nice (Keith Emerson, Lee Jackson and Brian Davison) play on the song Hell's Angels.
- 1973 : Lifemask – Brian Davison plays drums on the long suite The Lord's Prayer.
