= List of entertainment programs formerly distributed by American Public Television =

The following is a list of entertainment programs formerly distributed to public television stations (including PBS affiliates) through American Public Television. There is a separate list for current, upcoming and unreleased programming.

Legend
^{APT WORLDWIDE}	Also on APT Worldwide
^{CREATE}	Also on Create
^{HDTV}	High-definition television
^{ITVS}	Funded and distributed by Independent Television Service
^{LPB}	Funded and distributed by Latino Public Broadcasting
^{NHK}	Funded and distributed by NHK (Japan Broadcasting Corporation)
^{VMM}	Funded and distributed by Vision Maker Media (formerly Native American Public Broadcasting Consortium and Native American Public Telecommunications)
^{WORLD}	Also on WORLD

== Entertainment series ==
=== Drama ===
==== 1970s ====
Title	Premiere date	End date	Note(s)	Legend(s)	Source(s)
The Lone Ranger	September 1, 1975	August 31, 1986			
Fall of Eagles	June 30, 1976	June 29, 1989			
The Pallisers	February 1, 1977	November 30, 1980			
The Pallisers	August 1, 1983	October 31, 1987			
Shades of Greene	June 30, 1977	December 31, 1984			
The Glittering Prizes	November 1, 1977	November 30, 1985			
Rush	October 15, 1978	October 14, 1980			
Rush	June 15, 1984	June 14, 1986			
Rush	June 15, 1986	June 14, 1988			
Dick Tracy	January 1, 1979	September 30, 1983			
Adventures of Superman	March 1, 1979	February 28, 1984			
Naked City	March 1, 1979	February 28, 1981			
All Creatures Great and Small	May 1, 1979	May 31, 1988			
All Creatures Great and Small	October 1, 2006	November 30, 2009			

==== 1980s ====
Title	Premiere date	End date	Note(s)	Legend(s)	Source(s)
Yancy Derringer	January 1, 1980	December 31, 1981			
The Six Wives of Henry VIII	April 1, 1980	December 31, 1988	(Note: Distributed by PBS (as part of Masterpiece Theatre Season 1).)		
A Horseman Riding By	April 1, 1980	August 31, 1985			
Spy!	November 1, 1980	October 31, 1984			
The Twilight Zone	January 1, 1981	December 31, 1994			
The Paper Chase	January 15, 1981	May 31, 1983	(Note: Season 1 only.)		
Edward the King	February 1, 1981	January 31, 1983			
The Golden Age of Television	August 27, 1981	December 31, 1984	(Note: This package includes Marty (from The Philco Television Playhouse), Patterns (from Kraft Television Theatre), No Time for Sergeants, A Wind from the South and Bang the Drum Slowly (from The United States Steel Hour) and Requiem for a Heavyweight, The Comedian and Days of Wine and Roses (from Playhouse 90).)		
The Untouchables	September 1, 1981	January 31, 1990			
Oye Willie	February 1, 1982	January 31, 1984			
Dark Shadows	September 1, 1982	December 31, 1989			
The Goldbergs	January 1, 1983	December 31, 1984			
1915	February 1, 1983	January 31, 1985			
1915	November 1, 1985	October 31, 1987			
1915	November 1, 1987	October 31, 1989			
Combat!	September 1, 1983	August 31, 1986			
The Millionaire	October 1, 1983	September 30, 1985			
I Spy	December 1, 1983	August 31, 1987			
I Spy	May 1, 1998	April 30, 1999			
Perry Mason	January 1, 1984	August 31, 1996			
Bonanza	June 1, 1984	May 31, 1986			
Star Trek	June 30, 1984	May 31, 1995			
Rawhide	October 1, 1984	September 30, 1987			
Star Performance	October 1, 1984	September 30, 1987			
12 O'Clock High	December 1, 1984	July 31, 1987			
Space: 1999	January 1, 1985	December 31, 1988			
Alfred Hitchcock Presents	January 15, 1985	January 14, 1987			
Lost in Space	March 1, 1985	February 28, 1987			
Tenko	July 1, 1985	June 30, 1987			
The Tripods	September 1, 1985	August 31, 1987			
Peter Gunn	October 1, 1985	September 30, 1987			
Marshal Dillon	November 1, 1985	October 31, 1987			
Bergerac	January 1, 1986	January 31, 1996			
Captain Gallant of the Foreign Legion	January 1, 1986	December 31, 1987			
Captain Gallant of the Foreign Legion	September 1, 1989	August 31, 1991			
Shoestring	October 1, 1986	May 31, 1989			
The Professionals	October 1, 1986	April 30, 1992			
The Outer Limits	January 1, 1987	December 31, 1988			
The Sandbaggers	February 1, 1987	April 30, 1995			
Lou Grant	May 1, 1987	November 30, 1990			
Heimat	September 1, 1987	August 31, 1989			
Ben Casey	January 1, 1988	September 30, 1990			
The Fugitive	February 1, 1988	January 31, 1990			
The Prisoner	March 1, 1988	February 28, 1990			
The Prisoner	November 1, 2001	October 31, 2003			
The Invaders	April 1, 1988	December 31, 1993			
Smiley's People	May 1, 1988	December 31, 1990			
Tinker Tailor Soldier Spy	June 30, 1988	June 29, 1990	(Note: Distributed by PBS (as part of Great Performances Season 8).)		
The Monocled Mutineer	July 31, 1988	September 30, 1990	(Note: Four-part series.)		
Secret Agent	September 1, 1988	February 28, 1990			
Faerie Tale Theatre	September 1, 1988	August 31, 1992			
Bulman	September 1, 1988	August 31, 1993			
Star Trek: The Next Generation	February 1, 1989	September 30, 1991	(Note: Seasons 1-3 only.)		
The Waltons	September 1, 1989	August 31, 1991			

==== 1990s ====
Title	Premiere date	End date	Note(s)	Legend(s)	Source(s)
Fabian of Scotland Yard	January 1, 1991	December 31, 1992			
St. Elsewhere	March 1, 1991	March 31, 1995			
The White Shadow	March 15, 1991	March 14, 1995			
Emmerdale Farm	June 1, 1991	April 30, 1995			
Edward & Mrs. Simpson	June 15, 1991	September 30, 1993			
The Adventures of Robin Hood	June 30, 1991	June 29, 1994			
Robin Hood	June 30, 1991	June 29, 1994			
The New Adventures of Black Beauty	August 31, 1991	August 30, 1993			
Rebecca	May 1, 1992	April 30, 1994	(Note: Distributed by PBS (as part of Mystery! Season 1).)		
Survivors	June 1, 1992	May 31, 1995			
Capital City	November 1, 1992	December 31, 1995			
I'll Fly Away	October 1, 1993	November 30, 1996			
Hill Street Blues	January 1, 1994	December 31, 1995			
Little House on the Prairie	May 1, 1994	April 30, 1999			
Love Hurts	October 1, 1994	November 30, 1997			
Flambards	January 1, 1995	December 31, 1996			
The Duchess of Duke Street	April 1, 1995	December 31, 1997	(Note: Distributed by PBS (as part of Masterpiece Theatre Seasons 8 and 9).)		
The Man from U.N.C.L.E.	June 30, 1995	June 29, 1997			
Dangerfield	November 1, 1995	October 31, 2002			
Ballykissangel	September 1, 1996	November 30, 2007			
The House of Eliott	September 1, 1996	December 31, 1999			
One Step Beyond	December 1, 1996	November 30, 1998			
Brideshead Revisited	January 1, 1997	December 31, 1998	(Note: Distributed by PBS (as part of Great Performances Season 9).)		
I, Claudius	June 30, 1997	June 29, 2000	(Note: Distributed by PBS (as part of Masterpiece Theatre Season 7).)		
Neverwhere	February 1, 1998	February 29, 2000			
Jonathan Creek	March 1, 1998	May 31, 2000	(Note: Series 1 and 2 only.)		
Berkeley Square	March 1, 1999	February 28, 2001			
Oktober	May 1, 1999	April 30, 2001	(Note: Three-part series.) (Note: Also a TV movie that includes three episodes.)		
Grafters	June 1, 1999	March 31, 2002			
Space Island One	September 1, 1999	June 30, 2002			

==== 2000s ====
Title	Premiere date	End date	Note(s)	Legend(s)	Source(s)
Invisible Man*	January 1, 2000	December 31, 2001			
The Day of the Triffids	August 1, 2000	July 31, 2002			
Shades	June 30, 2001	June 29, 2003			
Chandler & Co.	January 1, 2002	August 31, 2004	(Note: Originally mystery genre in series 1.) (Note: Distributed by PBS (as part of Mystery! Season 16).)		
BBC Impact Package	January 1, 2002	December 31, 2003	(Note: This package includes various 1990s BBC drama films like Tender Loving Care and The Missing Postman.)		
Classic Drama Encores	January 5, 2002	January 4, 2004			
Agatha Christie's Miss Marple	June 30, 2002	October 30, 2009	(Note: Distributed by PBS (as part of Mystery! Seasons 6-9).)		
Piece of Cake	October 1, 2002	September 30, 2004	(Note: Distributed by PBS (as part of Masterpiece Theatre Season 19).)		
I Saw You	October 1, 2002	September 30, 2004			
The Glass	November 1, 2002	October 31, 2004			
Always Greener	January 1, 2003	December 31, 2004			
On Home Ground	February 1, 2003	January 31, 2005			
Murder in Mind	April 1, 2003	March 31, 2005	(Note: Series 2 only.)		
The Royal	September 1, 2003	June 29, 2011			
Two Thousand Acres of Sky	September 1, 2003	August 31, 2005			
Hope and Glory	October 1, 2003	September 30, 2005			
Campion	November 1, 2003	October 31, 2005	(Note: Distributed by PBS (as part of Mystery! Seasons 10 and 11).)		
The Darling Buds of May	April 1, 2004	March 31, 2006			
The Planman	April 1, 2004	March 31, 2006	(Note: Two-part series.)		
Servants	September 1, 2004	August 31, 2006			
Best of Upstairs, Downstairs	November 1, 2004	October 31, 2006			
Rosemary & Thyme	December 31, 2004	June 30, 2017			
Jeeves and Wooster	November 1, 2005	August 31, 2008	(Note: Distributed by PBS (as part of Masterpiece Theatre Seasons 20 and 22-24).)		
Upstairs, Downstairs	November 1, 2005	October 31, 2007	(Note: Distributed by PBS (as part of Masterpiece Theatre Seasons 3-6 and Masterpiece Classic Seasons 41 and 42).)		
New Tricks	March 1, 2006	February 29, 2008			
Distant Shores	April 1, 2006	November 30, 2008			
The Impressionists	December 1, 2006	March 29, 2009			
Ghostboat	December 31, 2006	February 28, 2009			
Doctor Who	March 1, 2007	March 31, 2010	(Note: Series 9 and 10 only.)		
Anne of Green Gables	March 1, 2007	November 26, 2017			
Philip Marlowe: Private Eye	August 1, 2007	July 31, 2009			
Kingdom	September 1, 2007	November 30, 2011			
Poldark	September 1, 2007	August 31, 2009	(Note: Series 1 only.) (Note: Distributed by PBS (as part of Masterpiece Theatre Seasons 6 and 7 and Masterpiece Classic Seasons 45-49).)		
Agatha Christie's Poirot	October 2, 2008	June 29, 2017	(Note: Distributed by PBS (as part of Mystery! now Masterpiece Mystery! Seasons 10-17, 39-41, and 44).)		
Lost in Austen	March 1, 2009	February 28, 2011			
Murdoch Mysteries	June 30, 2009	June 29, 2011			
Bonekickers	June 30, 2009	June 29, 2011			
Sharpe	December 1, 2009	November 30, 2011	(Note: Distributed by PBS (as part of Masterpiece Theatre Seasons 23, 24, and 36 and Masterpiece Classic Season 40).)		

==== 2010s ====
Title	Premiere date	End date	Note(s)	Legend(s)	Source(s)
Land Girls	January 1, 2011	December 31, 2013			
Garrow's Law	April 1, 2011	April 30, 2014			
Vera	April 1, 2012	March 31, 2018			
Dirk Gently	April 1, 2013	March 31, 2015			
The Ambassador	September 1, 2013	November 30, 2016			
Mr & Mrs Murder	April 1, 2014	March 31, 2016			
Mr & Mrs Murder	April 1, 2016	March 31, 2018			
Amnesia	May 1, 2014	April 30, 2016			
WPC 56	November 1, 2014	August 31, 2017			
The Politician's Husband	November 1, 2014	October 31, 2016			
A Place to Call Home	April 1, 2015	December 31, 2022			
The Last Enemy	May 1, 2015	August 31, 2016	(Note: Distributed by PBS (as part of Masterpiece Contemporary Season 38).)		
Hinterland	June 30, 2016	October 31, 2020			
800 Words	April 1, 2017	January 31, 2022			
Marley's Ghosts	August 1, 2017	July 31, 2019			
The Cobblestone Corridor	December 1, 2017	November 30, 2020			
Capital	January 1, 2018	December 31, 2019			
And Then There Were None	January 1, 2018	December 31, 2019			
The Bletchley Circle	February 1, 2019	January 31, 2021			
The Bletchley Circle	February 1, 2021	January 31, 2023			
Frankie Drake Mysteries	November 1, 2019	October 31, 2024			

==== 2020s ====
Title	Premiere date	End date	Note(s)	Legend(s)	Source(s)
The Victim	March 1, 2020	February 28, 2022			
The Victim	April 1, 2023	March 31, 2025			
The Poison Tree	August 1, 2020	July 31, 2022			
Packed to the Rafters	April 1, 2021	December 31, 2023	(Note: Seasons 1 and 2 only.)		
The Indian Doctor	May 1, 2021	April 30, 2025			
Rebus	April 1, 2022	March 31, 2024	(Note: Seasons 2-4 only.)		
To Heal the Heart	July 1, 2022	March 31, 2023		^{NHK}	
Teen Regime	April 1, 2023	August 31, 2023		^{NHK}	
Deadline	August 1, 2023	July 31, 2025			
L'Opera	December 1, 2023	November 30, 2025			
The Porter	May 1, 2024	April 30, 2026			
Ghost Stories	October 1, 2024	September 30, 2026			
The First Lady	October 1, 2024	September 30, 2026			

=== Comedy ===
==== 1970s ====
Title	Premiere date	End date	Note(s)	Legend(s)	Source(s)
Monty Python's Flying Circus	October 1, 1974	January 31, 1981			
Monty Python's Flying Circus	July 1, 1983	July 31, 1989			
Monty Python's Flying Circus	February 28, 1998	May 31, 1999			
Dad's Army	January 1, 1976	December 31, 1987	(Note: Series 1-5 only.)		
Fawlty Towers	June 1, 1976	December 31, 1984			
The Bill Cosby Show	June 30, 1976	June 29, 1978			
The Goodies	August 1, 1976	November 30, 1982			
Wodehouse Playhouse	June 1, 1977	August 31, 1994			
The Two Ronnies	November 1, 1977	December 31, 1988			
Porky Pig Cartoons	November 1, 1977	August 31, 1979			
The Jack Benny Show	January 1, 1978	February 29, 1980			
The Fall and Rise of Reginald Perrin	May 1, 1978	May 31, 1995	(Note: Series 1-3 only.)		
Ripping Yarns	August 1, 1978	December 31, 1986			
Leave It to Beaver	January 1, 1979	December 31, 1987			

==== 1980s ====
Title	Premiere date	End date	Note(s)	Legend(s)	Source(s)
The Phil Silvers Show	January 1, 1980	December 31, 1984			
Good Neighbors	February 1, 1980	January 31, 1986			
To the Manor Born	July 15, 1980	December 31, 1990			
Doctor in the House	October 1, 1980	December 31, 1984			
Up Pompeii!	February 1, 1981	January 31, 1983			
Up Pompeii!	February 1, 1983	January 31, 1985			
Butterflies	June 1, 1981	December 31, 1995			
Betty Boop Cartoons	August 1, 1981	October 31, 1983			
The Paul Hogan Show	October 1, 1981	October 31, 1987			
Father, Dear Father	January 15, 1982	April 30, 1984			
The Morecambe & Wise Show	February 1, 1982	March 31, 1985			
The Hitchhiker's Guide to the Galaxy	April 1, 1982	March 31, 1984			
The Hitchhiker's Guide to the Galaxy	1988	1990			
The Hitchhiker's Guide to the Galaxy	March 1, 2003	February 28, 2005			
The Bob Newhart Show	August 1, 1982	July 31, 1985			
The Avengers	October 1, 1982	December 31, 1993			
The Dick Emery Show	October 1, 1982	January 31, 1987			
The Best of Gleason	June 1, 1983	May 31, 1985			
The Jackie Gleason Show	July 15, 1983	March 31, 1985			
Father Knows Best	August 1, 1983	July 31, 1985			
Bless Me, Father	August 1, 1983	March 31, 2004			
The Uncle Floyd Show	October 31, 1983	October 30, 1986			
The Burns and Allen Show	February 1, 1984	January 31, 1986			
The Burns and Allen Show	February 1, 1997	August 31, 2000			
The Honeymooners	March 1, 1984	August 31, 1999			
Sorry!	March 15, 1984	April 30, 1988			
The Mary Tyler Moore Show	June 1, 1984	May 31, 1986			
The Best of Groucho	September 1, 1984	August 31, 1986			
SCTV	January 1, 1985	June 30, 1990			
I Love Lucy	February 1, 1985	January 31, 1987			
I Love Lucy	April 1, 1989	September 30, 1992			
The Colgate Comedy Hour	February 1, 1985	January 31, 1989			
The Colgate Comedy Hour	December 1, 1997	March 31, 2000			
Sweet Sixteen	April 1, 1985	March 31, 1987			
Blake's 7	September 1, 1985	October 31, 1993			
Yes Minister	October 1, 1985	December 31, 1991			
Brass	October 1, 1985	September 30, 1987			
Mind Your Language	October 1, 1985	September 30, 1987			
Wendy and Me	October 1, 1985	September 30, 1987			
The Beachcombers	October 15, 1985	August 31, 1986			
Agony	November 1, 1985	October 31, 1987			
Mister Ed	November 1, 1985	October 31, 1987			
TV Classics	November 1, 1985	March 31, 1992	(Note: This package includes various 1950s-60s classic shows like The Cisco Kid, The Buick-Berle Show, This Is Your Life, and The Colgate Comedy Hour.)		
Make Room for Daddy	January 1, 1986	December 31, 1987			
Mother and Son	May 1, 1986	January 31, 2000			
'Allo 'Allo!	September 1, 1986	December 31, 1991	(Note: Series 1-6 only.)		
Our Gang	September 1, 1986	October 31, 1988			
Family Affair	October 1, 1986	September 30, 1987			
Open All Hours	January 1, 1987	December 31, 1998			
The Bullwinkle Show	January 1, 1987	December 31, 1988			
The Underdog Show	January 1, 1987	December 31, 1988			
Red Skelton Package	March 1, 1987	January 31, 2003			
Fairly Secret Army	March 1, 1987	February 28, 1989			
The Dick Van Dyke Show	April 1, 1987	December 31, 1991			
Topper	April 1, 1987	March 31, 1989			
Fresh Fields	April 1, 1987	December 31, 1992			
The Best of Saturday Night Live	August 1, 1987	August 31, 1991			
The Best of Your Show of Shows	September 1, 1987	November 30, 1990			
The Adventures of Ozzie and Harriet	September 1, 1987	August 31, 1992			
The Many Wives of Patrick	September 1, 1987	August 31, 1989			
Never the Twain	September 15, 1987	October 31, 1991			
Are You Being Served?	October 1, 1987	1998			
No Place Like Home	October 1, 1987	November 30, 1992			
The Best of Sid Caesar	October 15, 1987	October 14, 1992			
EastEnders	January 1, 1988	December 31, 1996			
Red Dwarf	March 1, 1989	August 31, 1996			
Two's Company	June 1, 1989	May 31, 1991			
Two's Company	June 30, 2003	June 29, 2005			
After Henry	June 1, 1989	November 30, 1992			
All in the Family	September 1, 1989	August 31, 1991			

==== 1990s ====
Title	Premiere date	End date	Note(s)	Legend(s)	Source(s)
Yes, Prime Minister	January 1, 1990	December 31, 1991			
Shelley	February 1, 1990	August 31, 1994			
French Fields	March 1, 1990	April 30, 1994			
Star Cops	June 1, 1990	September 30, 1993			
Thompson	June 30, 1990	June 29, 1992			
Three Up, Two Down	August 1, 1990	July 31, 1993			
Alexei Sayle's Stuff	September 1, 1990	December 31, 1992			
No Job for a Lady	September 1, 1990	December 31, 1994			
May to December	February 1, 1991	March 31, 1996			
George of the Jungle	August 1, 1991	April 30, 1994			
Keeping Up Appearances	September 1, 1992	February 28, 1995			
The Dame Edna Experience	December 1, 1992	January 31, 2000			
Take a Letter, Mr. Jones	March 1, 1993	December 31, 1995			
One Foot in the Grave	June 1, 1994	May 31, 1996			
My Husband and I	June 30, 1994	June 29, 1997			
Joking Apart	November 1, 1994	December 31, 1996			
Last of the Summer Wine	March 1, 1995	February 28, 1997			
Mr. Bean	September 1, 1995	August 31, 1997			
Mr. Bean	September 1, 1997	August 31, 1999			
Mr. Bean	April 1, 2003	March 31, 2004			
Mr. Bean	November 1, 2011	October 31, 2013			
2point4 Children	March 1, 1996	February 28, 1998			
The Thin Blue Line	January 1, 1997	December 31, 1998			
The Thin Blue Line	January 1, 1999	December 31, 2000			
The Thin Blue Line	November 1, 2011	October 31, 2013			
Faith in the Future	May 1, 1997	December 31, 1999			
Goodnight Sweetheart	June 30, 1998	November 30, 2000	(Note: Series 1-4 only.)		
El Neuno: The Big Wind from the North	August 8, 1998	December 31, 2007			
Chalk	January 1, 1999	December 31, 1999			

==== 2000s ====
Title	Premiere date	End date	Note(s)	Legend(s)	Source(s)
The Industry	January 1, 2000	March 31, 2003	(Note: Drama genre in season 1.)		
Duck Patrol	April 1, 2000	April 30, 2002			
No, Honestly	September 1, 2000	August 31, 2002			
Dark Ages	September 1, 2000	July 31, 2002			
Slaphappy	June 30, 2001	June 29, 2003			
Off Limits	January 20, 2002	January 19, 2008			
Home to Roost	March 1, 2002	February 29, 2004			
Home to Roost	June 30, 2006	August 31, 2008			
Mal Sharpe Specials	April 28, 2002	April 27, 2008	(Note: This package includes Mal Sharpe's San Francisco, Mal Sharpe's San Francisco Take Two!, Hello Columbus! with Mal Sharpe and Mal Sharpe: America's Man on the Street - 30th Anniversary.)		
Mr. Bean Animation	April 1, 2003	March 30, 2004			
Downwardly Mobile	April 1, 2003	March 31, 2005			
That's My Boy	October 1, 2003	September 30, 2005			
An American in Canada	March 31, 2004	September 30, 2006			
The Piglet Files	April 1, 2004	March 31, 2006			
The Newsroom	March 31, 2005	October 31, 2007	(Note: Seasons 2 and 3 only.)		
Windy Acres	January 1, 2006	December 31, 2007			
Mapp & Lucia	January 1, 2006	December 31, 2006			
The Second City: First Family of Comedy	December 1, 2006	November 30, 2008			
A Fine Romance	July 30, 2007	October 30, 2011			
The Best of The Jack Benny Program	April 1, 2008	September 30, 2010	(Note: aka The Best of The Jack Benny Show.) (Note: Music & entertainment genre in season 1 and the 1st release.)		
The Best of The Jack Benny Program	August 1, 2010	September 30, 2012	(Note: aka The Best of The Jack Benny Show.) (Note: Music & entertainment genre in season 1 and the 1st release.)		
The Adventures of Ozzie and Harriet Revisited	December 1, 2008	November 30, 2009			
Ladies of Letters	December 1, 2009	November 30, 2012	(Note: Drama genre in the 1st release.)		
Ladies of Letters	April 1, 2013	March 31, 2015	(Note: Drama genre in the 1st release.)		
Ladies of Letters	April 1, 2021	March 31, 2023	(Note: Drama genre in the 1st release.)		
The Best of The Kumars at No. 42	December 1, 2009	November 30, 2011	(Note: This program includes Richard E. Grant and Michael Parkinson, Graham Norton and Davina McCall, Art Malik and Charlie Dimmock, Minnie Driver and Fay Ripley, Ray Winstone and Laurence Llewelyn-Bowen, Helena Bonham Carter and Ismail Merchant, Stephen Fry and Lesley Garrett, Donny Osmond and Westlife, Lulu and Robson Green, Robin Gibb and Shane Richie, Boy George and June Whitfield, and Christmas Special - Mark Owen, Trinny and Susannah and Darius.)		

==== 2010s ====
Title	Premiere date	End date	Note(s)	Legend(s)	Source(s)
Reggie Perrin	November 1, 2010	December 31, 2012			
Mystery Science Theater 3000	March 1, 2015	December 31, 2017	(Note: This program includes Gunslinger, Manos: The Hands of Fate, The Unearthly, and Hercules and the Conquest of Atlantis (hosted by Joel Robinson) in season 1 and Cave Dwellers, Hercules, The Mad Monster, Pod People, Teenagers from Outer Space and The Killer Shrews (hosted by Joel Hodgson) and Beginning of the End, Bloodlust!, Merlin's Shop of Mystical Wonders, Night of the Blood Beast, The Incredibly Strange Creatures Who Stopped Living and Became Mixed-Up Zombies, and The Phantom Planet (hosted by Mike Nelson) in season 2.)		
Detectorists	September 1, 2015	June 29, 2020			
Dreamland	June 30, 2018	March 31, 2021			

==== 2020s ====
Title	Premiere date	End date	Note(s)	Legend(s)	Source(s)
The Carol Burnett Show: Carol's Favorites	June 1, 2020	April 30, 2024			
The Goes Wrong Show	July 1, 2022	June 30, 2024			
Up the Women	November 1, 2024	October 31, 2026			

=== Music & entertainment ===
==== 1970s ====
Title	Premiere date	End date	Note(s)	Legend(s)	Source(s)
Opera Theater	July 1, 1977	August 31, 1979			

==== 1980s ====
Title	Premiere date	End date	Note(s)	Legend(s)	Source(s)
Video Music Box	June 1, 1985	July 31, 1996			
Rockschool	October 23, 1985	November 3, 1989			
The Wonderful World of Disney	November 1, 1986	September 30, 1992			

==== 1990s ====
Title	Premiere date	End date	Note(s)	Legend(s)	Source(s)
The Bob Dylan 30th Anniversary Celebration	March 1, 1993	February 28, 1997			
Live at the Woodlands	September 1, 1994	August 31, 1998			
The Ballads of Madison County	June 30, 1995	June 29, 1997			
Scottish Fiddle Orchestra	August 1, 1995	December 31, 1998			
Music Maestro	November 1, 1995	October 31, 1997			
A New World of Music	July 31, 1996	July 31, 1997	(Note: This program includes A New World of Music and Dvorak at the Colon.)		
Guy Lombardo and His Royal Canadians	August 1, 1996	May 31, 2014			
Brownville Concert Series	September 1, 1996	May 31, 2000			
Nature Music Specials	January 1, 1997	December 31, 1998	(Note: This package includes Real Sanctuary and Music of Yosemite.)		
Sessions at West 54th	July 5, 1997	September 28, 2002			
Jean-Michel Jarre Specials	May 1, 1998	December 31, 1999	(Note: This package includes Oxygen in Moscow and A Portrait.)		
The Composers' Specials/Beethoven Lives Upstairs	August 1, 1998	August 31, 2000			
Engelbert Humperdinck Specials	August 1, 1998	July 31, 2000	(Note: This package includes Engelbert Humperdinck Live at the Hippodrome, Engelbert Humperdinck: King of Romance and Engelbert Humperdinck: Love Unchained.)		
Amazing Music	November 1, 1998	October 31, 2001			
Howard Goodall's Choir Works	December 1, 1998	November 30, 2000			
CD Highway	January 1, 1999	July 31, 2001			
Hard Rock Live	November 1, 1999	September 30, 2000			

==== 2000s ====
Title	Premiere date	End date	Note(s)	Legend(s)	Source(s)
Robot Wars	January 1, 2000	March 31, 2002	(Note: Series 2 and 3 only.) (Note: aka Robot Wars UK in series 3.)		
Classical Music Package	January 1, 2000	December 31, 2001	(Note: This package includes various TV classical music by composers.)		
Simon Rattle Package	June 1, 2000	May 31, 2002	(Note: This package includes Moving On and Arrivederci Brum.)		
Howard Goodall's Big Bangs	June 30, 2000	June 29, 2002			
America's Music: Gospel	August 1, 2000	July 31, 2002			
Techno Games 2000	September 11, 2000	September 10, 2001			
Chuck Jones Collection	November 1, 2000	October 31, 2002			
Junction 301: Crossroads of Culture & Arts	September 1, 2001	August 31, 2010			
The Amnesty International Package	November 1, 2001	October 31, 2003	(Note: This package includes various Amnesty International films.)		
BBC Classical Music Package	January 1, 2002	December 31, 2003	(Note: This package includes various TV BBC classical music by composers.)		
MHz Presents	November 1, 2002	November 30, 2006		^{APT WORLDWIDE}	
Techno Games 2003	November 1, 2003	October 31, 2005			
The Music Seen	January 3, 2004	January 3, 2007			
The Music Seen	June 7, 2008	June 6, 2017			
Bill Wyman's Blues Odyssey	September 1, 2004	August 31, 2006			
The International DanceSport World Championships	May 1, 2005	April 30, 2007			
The International DanceSport World Championships 2005	March 1, 2006	February 29, 2008			
Legends of Jazz with Ramsey Lewis	April 1, 2006	March 31, 2010	(Note: Originally titled Legends of Jazz.)		
The International DanceSport World Championships 2006	March 1, 2007	March 1, 2009			
Xerox Rochester International Jazz Festival	May 19, 2007	September 30, 2019	(Note: aka Rochester International Jazz Festival in seasons 1-3.) (Note: Alternatively titled Xerox Rochester International Jazz Festival (Oh, Canada!) in season 8.)		
Legends & Lyrics	April 2, 2009	April 1, 2011			

==== 2010s ====
Title	Premiere date	End date	Note(s)	Legend(s)	Source(s)
Front and Center	April 5, 2012	March 14, 2024	(Note: aka Front Row Center in season 1.) (Note: Seasons 1-11 only.)		
Infinity Hall Live	June 1, 2012	May 31, 2018			
Discover Vivaldi's Four Seasons	May 1, 2013	April 30, 2016		^{APT WORLDWIDE}	
Discover Vivaldi's Four Seasons	May 1, 2022	April 30, 2025		^{APT WORLDWIDE}	
Music City Roots: Live from the Factory	September 5, 2013	January 1, 2020	(Note: aka Music City Roots: Live from the Loveless Café in seasons 1 and 2.)		
Michael Feinstein's American Songbook	December 1, 2014	November 30, 2016			
Speakeasy	January 1, 2015	October 3, 2017			
Daniel O'Donnell Music and Memories	March 21, 2015	March 20, 2017			
New Tanglewood Tales: Backstage with Rising Artists	May 2, 2015	May 1, 2017			
The Kate	February 4, 2016	April 5, 2026			
Fall in Love with Music	March 30, 2016	March 29, 2018		^{APT WORLDWIDE}	
Fall in Love with Music	May 1, 2022	April 30, 2025		^{APT WORLDWIDE}	
Songs at the Center	April 7, 2016	May 6, 2023	(Note: Seasons 1-6 only.) (Note: Now distributed by NETA (aka National Educational Telecommunications Association).)		
New Tanglewood Tales: Life on Stage and Off	May 4, 2016	May 3, 2022			
World DanceSport GrandSlam Series	September 6, 2016	September 5, 2018			
The Lowertown Line.	January 20, 2017	January 19, 2023			
The Experience with Dedry Jones	April 1, 2018	March 31, 2021			
BSO 360	September 1, 2018	August 31, 2022			
2017 World DanceSport GrandSlam Series	May 7, 2018	May 6, 2020			

==== 2020s ====
Title	Premiere date	End date	Note(s)	Legend(s)	Source(s)
Jonathan Antoine in Concert: Going the Distance	February 23, 2020	February 22, 2026			

=== Feature film ===
==== 1970s ====
Title	Premiere date	End date	Note(s)	Legend(s)	Source(s)
Captain America	April 1, 1976	July 31, 1976			
The Flash Gordon Serials	December 1, 1979	September 30, 1988	(Note: This serial film package includes Flash Gordon: Space Soldiers, Flash Gordon's Trip to Mars and Flash Gordon Conquers the Universe.)		

==== 1980s ====
Title	Premiere date	End date	Note(s)	Legend(s)	Source(s)
Superman	September 15, 1985	September 14, 1987			
Buck Rogers	September 15, 1985	October 31, 1986			

==== 1990s ====
Title	Premiere date	End date	Note(s)	Legend(s)	Source(s)
Independent Film Package	July 1, 1995	June 30, 1996	(Note: This film package includes Matewan (1987), The Last Metro (1980), The Last Wave (1977), Smithereens (1982), Amarcord (1973), Household Saints (1993), Cries and Whispers (1982), Monster in a Box (1992), Johnny Stecchino (1991) and more.)		
Ed Wood Package	August 1, 1995	July 31, 1997	(Note: This package includes Look Back at Angora (as a documentary genre) and The Violent Years (as a feature film genre).)		
Clark Gable Film Package	November 1, 1996	August 31, 1998	(Note: This film package includes various Clark Gable films such as Hold Your Man (1933), Mutiny on the Bounty (1935), Love on the Run (1936), Men in White (1934), Susan Lenox (Her Fall and Rise) (1931) and Forsaking All Others (1934).)		
20th Century Fox Classics	January 1, 1997	December 31, 2005			
Warner/Turner Film Package	April 1, 1998	May 31, 2004			
Short Cuts	August 2, 1998	November 27, 2003			
The Short List	October 31, 1998	November 4, 2008	(Note: Distributed by NETA (aka National Educational Telecommunications Association) in seasons 9, 14, and 15.)		
Elvis Film Package	November 1, 1998	May 31, 2000	(Note: This film package includes various Elvis Presley films such as Elvis: That's the Way It Is (1970), Jailhouse Rock (1957), G.I. Blues (1960) and Viva Las Vegas (1964).)		

==== 2000s ====
Title	Premiere date	End date	Note(s)	Legend(s)	Source(s)
Independent View	November 1, 2001	October 31, 2003			
Buena Vista Film Package	January 1, 2003	March 31, 2005	(Note: This film package includes the "A" films: Duel in the Sun (1946), The Farmer's Daughter (1947), Intermezzo (1939), Notorious (1946), The Paradine Case (1947), Portrait of Jennie (1948), Rebecca (1940), Since You Went Away (1944), Spellbound (1945) and The Spiral Staircase (1946) and the "B" films: The Adventures of Tom Sawyer (1938), Little Lord Fauntleroy (1936) and Nothing Sacred (1937).)		
Woody Allen Film Package	January 1, 2003	June 30, 2005	(Note: This film package includes Bananas (1971), Manhattan (1979), Radio Days (1987), A Midsummer Night's Sex Comedy (1982), Another Woman (1988), The Purple Rose of Cairo (1985), Hannah and Her Sisters (1986), Zelig (1983), Stardust Memories (1980), Love and Death (1975) and Annie Hall (1976).)		
Africa in the Picture	February 1, 2003	January 31, 2004			
Warner/Turner/MGM Classic Film Collection	April 1, 2004	February 28, 2007			
Fall 2005 Film Package	January 1, 2007	May 31, 2009	(Note: This film package includes various 20th Century Fox, Sony/MGM and Warner Bros. films such as Big (1988), Cocoon (1985), Laura (1944), The Princess Bride (1987), The Verdict (1982) and Young Frankenstein (1974).)		
New Classics & Old Favorites Film Package	February 1, 2009	October 31, 2011	(Note: This film package includes various 20th Century Fox, Sony/MGM and Warner Bros. films such as When Harry Met Sally (1989), Thelma & Louise (1991) and Hotel Rwanda (2004).)		

==== 2010s ====
Title	Premiere date	End date	Note(s)	Legend(s)	Source(s)
Hollywood Stars Film Package	September 1, 2011	September 30, 2014			
All-Star Film Collection	October 1, 2014	November 30, 2017			
Jewish Film Showcase	October 22, 2017	October 21, 2021			

=== Holiday ===
==== 1990s ====
Title	Premiere date	End date	Note(s)	Legend(s)	Source(s)
Chanuka/Passover Specials	December 1, 1991	December 31, 2001	(Note: This package includes Chanuka at Bubbe's and Passover at Bubbe's.)		
The Christmas Animation Package	December 3, 1995	January 1, 2000	(Note: This package includes The Snowman and The Mousehole Cat.)		

== Entertainment specials ==
=== Drama ===
==== 1980s ====
Title	Premiere date	End date	Note(s)	Legend(s)	Source(s)
Our Town	January 1, 1984	May 31, 1984	(Note: Distributed by PBS (as part of Great Performances Season 17).)		
All Creatures Great and Small Special	December 1, 1985	December 31, 1987			

==== 1990s ====
Title	Premiere date	End date	Note(s)	Legend(s)	Source(s)
Betrayal	January 17, 1993	January 16, 1995			
Count Dracula	October 1, 1995	October 31, 1997	(Note: Distributed by PBS (as part of Great Performances Season 5).)		
Mister Corbett's Ghost	December 1, 1996	January 1, 1999			
A Fatal Inversion	March 1, 1997	February 28, 1999	(Note: This TV movie includes three episodes.)		
jane	December 1, 1997	November 30, 2000			
Angel Passing	May 1, 1999	April 30, 2001			

==== 2000s ====
Title	Premiere date	End date	Note(s)	Legend(s)	Source(s)
Rainbow's End	March 1, 2000	February 28, 2002			
Macbeth	March 1, 2000	February 28, 2002			
Mir Friends	December 1, 2000	November 30, 2002			
The Canterville Ghost	February 1, 2001	January 31, 2003			
Buried Treasure	January 1, 2002	December 31, 2003			
In the Name of Love	February 1, 2002	January 31, 2004	(Note: Originally mystery genre.)		
The Quarrel	April 1, 2003	March 31, 2005			
American Shorts: Poof! and a Voice to Be Reckoned With	October 1, 2003	September 30, 2008			
Agatha Christie's The Pale Horse	November 1, 2003	October 31, 2005			
Stig of the Dump	November 1, 2003	October 31, 2005			
The Greatest Store in the World	December 1, 2003	December 31, 2005			
The Greatest Store in the World	December 1, 2008	December 31, 2010			
The Taste of Dirt	February 1, 2004	January 31, 2008			
One of the Missing	April 2, 2004	April 1, 2012			
Margery & Gladys	August 1, 2004	July 31, 2006			
Flashcards	September 3, 2004	September 2, 2006			
The Suitor	September 1, 2005	August 31, 2008			
Jeremiah Strong	October 2, 2005	October 1, 2009			
Stone Mansion	October 2, 2005	October 1, 2007			
Agatha Christie: A Life in Pictures	September 1, 2006	August 31, 2008			
The Impossible Spy	March 31, 2007	March 30, 2009			
Albert Schweitzer: Called to Africa	April 8, 2007	April 7, 2011			
Agatha Christie: Unfinished Portrait	November 1, 2007	October 31, 2009			
Doctor Who: The Christmas Invasion	March 31, 2008	March 31, 2010			
Eroica	June 1, 2008	May 31, 2010			
The Railway Children	June 30, 2008	June 29, 2010			
Kennedy	June 30, 2008	June 29, 2010			
Ballet Shoes	December 1, 2008	February 28, 2011			

==== 2010s ====
Title	Premiere date	End date	Note(s)	Legend(s)	Source(s)
Crooked House	October 15, 2010	October 14, 2012			
Doc Martin: The Movie	January 15, 2012	January 14, 2014			
Doc Martin: The Movie	June 1, 2014	May 31, 2014			
Doc Martin: The Movie	June 1, 2016	May 31, 2018			
Doc Martin and the Legend of the Cloutie	April 1, 2012	March 31, 2014			
Doc Martin and the Legend of the Cloutie	June 1, 2014	May 31, 2016			
Doc Martin and the Legend of the Cloutie	July 1, 2016	June 30, 2018			
Sisters of War	January 1, 2013	December 31, 2014			
The Scapegoat	June 21, 2013	June 20, 2015			
The Best of Men	September 1, 2013	August 31, 2015			
The Soap Myth	March 5, 2014	March 4, 2016			
The Man Who Lost His Head	August 1, 2014	July 31, 2016			
Doc Martin: Seven Grumpy Seasons	November 26, 2015	December 26, 2017			
Edgar Allan Poe's Mystery Theatre	September 1, 2016	August 31, 2020			
A Midsomer Conversation with Neil Dudgeon	June 30, 2019	June 29, 2021			
The Perseus Survivor	June 30, 2019	June 29, 2021			

==== 2020s ====
Title	Premiere date	End date	Note(s)	Legend(s)	Source(s)
A Stranger in Shanghai	January 1, 2021	February 28, 2021		^{NHK}	
20 Things to Do in Midsomer... Before You Die	March 1, 2022	February 29, 2024			

=== Comedy ===
==== 1990s ====
Title	Premiere date	End date	Note(s)	Legend(s)	Source(s)
Here He Is... the One, the Only... Groucho	November 1, 1992	October 31, 1995			
Here He Is... the One, the Only... Groucho	July 1, 2007	June 30, 2010			
Bill Cosby: Mr. Sapolsky, with Love	March 1, 1998	February 29, 2000			
Bill Cosby: Mr. Sapolsky, with Love	February 14, 2003	February 13, 2004			
Funny Women: Patricia Routledge	March 1, 1999	February 28, 2001	(Note: Biography genre in the 1st, 2nd and 3rd releases.)		
Funny Women: Patricia Routledge	June 30, 2001	June 29, 2003	(Note: Biography genre in the 1st, 2nd and 3rd releases.)		
Funny Women: Patricia Routledge	November 1, 2003	October 31, 2005	(Note: Biography genre in the 1st, 2nd and 3rd releases.)		
Funny Women: Patricia Routledge	November 1, 2006	October 31, 2008	(Note: Biography genre in the 1st, 2nd and 3rd releases.)		

==== 2000s ====
Title	Premiere date	End date	Note(s)	Legend(s)	Source(s)
A Salute to British Comedy on American Public TV	March 1, 2000	March 31, 2003			
Funny Turns: John Inman	March 1, 2001	February 28, 2003	(Note: Biography genre in the 1st release.)		
Funny Turns: John Inman	March 1, 2004	February 28, 2006	(Note: Biography genre in the 1st release.)		
Funny Turns: John Inman	November 1, 2006	October 31, 2008	(Note: Biography genre in the 1st release.)		
Laughing Matters with Brett Leake	April 4, 2003	April 3, 2016			
Becoming a Humor Being	August 1, 2004	July 31, 2007			
Blackadder: The Special	March 1, 2007	February 28, 2009			
Slaphappy The Movie	August 1, 2007	July 31, 2009			

==== 2010s ====
Title	Premiere date	End date	Note(s)	Legend(s)	Source(s)
The Rutles: All You Need Is Cash	February 1, 2014	January 31, 2016			
Detectorists Special (Episode #207)	March 1, 2017	February 28, 2020			
Mel Brooks & Carl Reiner Salute Sid Caesar	June 3, 2019	June 30, 2021			

==== 2020s ====
Title	Premiere date	End date	Note(s)	Legend(s)	Source(s)
It's a Match	June 1, 2022	May 31, 2024			
A Christmas Carol Goes Wrong	December 1, 2023	November 30, 2025			
Peter Pan Goes Wrong	May 1, 2024	April 30, 2026			

=== Music & entertainment ===
==== 1970s ====
Title	Premiere date	End date	Note(s)	Legend(s)	Source(s)
Sing America Sing	March 22, 1976	May 31, 1981			

==== 1980s ====
Title	Premiere date	End date	Note(s)	Legend(s)	Source(s)
Boots Randolph and Friends	December 5, 1982	June 30, 1987			
The Everly Brothers' Rock 'n' Roll Odyssey	March 1, 1984	December 31, 1986			
The Everly Brothers' Rock 'n' Roll Odyssey	August 1, 1995	July 31, 1997			
Diva in Concert	May 17, 1985	June 1, 1988			
Pavarotti in Vienna	March 8, 1987	March 31, 1990			
Bobby Floyd in Concert	October 1, 1987	September 30, 1989	(Note: The 2nd release was planned to end on December 31, 1991.)		
Bobby Floyd in Concert	January 1, 1990	September 19, 1990	(Note: The 2nd release was planned to end on December 31, 1991.)		
James Taylor in Concert	March 3, 1988	July 31, 1993			
The Quintessential Peggy Lee	August 1, 1989	July 31, 1991			
The Quintessential Peggy Lee	August 1, 2002	July 31, 2004			

==== 1990s ====
Title	Premiere date	End date	Note(s)	Legend(s)	Source(s)
Les Miserables: Stage by Stage	March 1, 1990	February 28, 1993			
Les Miserables: Stage by Stage	November 1, 1996	October 31, 1998			
Hail! Hail! Rock 'n' Roll	March 1, 1990	February 29, 1992			
The Temptations: Get Ready	January 1, 1991	December 31, 1992			
The Temptations: Get Ready	June 30, 1999	June 29, 2001			
Carreras Domingo Pavarotti in Concert	March 1, 1991	April 1, 1993			
Carreras Domingo Pavarotti in Concert	August 1, 1993	January 1, 1996			
Carreras Domingo Pavarotti in Concert	March 1, 1996	January 31, 1998			
Carreras Domingo Pavarotti in Concert	June 30, 1998	January 1, 1999			
Carreras Domingo Pavarotti in Concert	August 1, 2002	January 1, 2005			
Carreras Domingo Pavarotti in Concert	November 23, 2007	June 30, 2008			
Carreras Domingo Pavarotti in Concert	June 1, 2010	June 30, 2011			
Carreras Domingo Pavarotti in Concert	March 1, 2015	March 31, 2016			
Harry Chapin in Concert: You Are the Only Song	August 1, 1991	August 31, 1994			
Harry Chapin in Concert: You Are the Only Song	February 1, 2002	January 31, 2004			
A Tribute to Harry Chapin	August 1, 1991	August 31, 1994			
The Moody Blues: Legend of a Band	August 2, 1991	August 1, 1995			
Neil Sedaka in Concert	March 1, 1992	April 1, 1995			
Tropical Sweets	June 7, 1992	June 6, 1999			
Rockroots	August 1, 1992	August 31, 1995			
Roger Whittaker in Concert	August 1, 1992	March 31, 1995			
Liza Minnelli Live! at Radio City Music Hall	December 9, 1992	December 31, 1995			
The King and I: Recording a Hollywood Dream with Julie Andrews	March 1, 1993	March 31, 1995			
The Moody Blues in Concert at Red Rocks	March 13, 1993	March 31, 1996			
Kenny Loggins From the Redwoods	August 11, 1993	August 31, 1996			
Chicago: In Concert at the Greek Theatre	November 26, 1993	November 25, 1996			
Frankie Valli & the Four Seasons	November 27, 1993	December 31, 1995			
Frankie Valli & the Four Seasons	March 1, 2002	February 29, 2004			
Pavarotti & Friends	December 1, 1993	December 31, 1996	(Note: Distributed by PBS (as part of Great Performances Season 26).)		
Roger Whittaker: The Celebration Concert	December 4, 1993	December 3, 1996			
A Musical Foray	January 29, 1994	January 28, 1997			
Pavarotti: My Heart's Delight	February 25, 1994	August 31, 1997			
Santana: Sacred Fire Live in Mexico	March 1, 1994	February 28, 1996			
Santana: Sacred Fire Live in Mexico	June 1, 1996	August 31, 1998			
Santana: Sacred Fire Live in Mexico	March 1, 2000	March 31, 2002			
Yanni in Concert: Live at the Acropolis	March 1, 1994	February 28, 1998			
Yanni in Concert: Live at the Acropolis	November 1, 2021	December 31, 2023			
A Thanksgiving of American Folk Hymns	November 23, 1994	November 30, 2005	(Note: Originally Holiday genre.)		
The Eagles: In the Spotlight	December 1, 1994	December 31, 1996			
Beethoven Violin Concerto in D Major, Op. 61 Soloist Kyung-Wha Chung	January 8, 1995	August 31, 1998			
Prince Rogers Nelson	February 1, 1995	January 31, 1998			
Traffic: Live at Santa Monica '72	April 9, 1995	April 8, 1997			
Everly Brothers Reunion Concert	August 1, 1995	July 31, 1997			
Everly Brothers Reunion Concert	August 1, 2002	July 31, 2004			
Yesyears	August 1, 1995	July 31, 1997			
Dead Ahead: The Grateful Dead Concert	August 1, 1995	August 31, 1998			
Nature's Symphony	August 1, 1995	December 31, 1999			
Foreigner: Feels Like the First Time	August 4, 1995	August 3, 1997			
Pavarotti & Friends 2	September 1, 1995	December 31, 1998			
Jimmy Buffett: Live by the Bay	December 1, 1995	November 30, 1997			
Tangerine Dream: Three Phase	December 30, 1995	December 29, 1997			
André Rieu with the Strauss Orchestra	February 24, 1996	February 23, 2004	(Note: Also known as Andre Rieu & the Strauss Orchestra: From Holland with Love.)		
Glenn Frey: Strange Weather, Live in Dublin	February 28, 1996	February 28, 1997			
Loreena McKennitt: No Journey's End	March 1, 1996	February 28, 1998		^{APT WORLDWIDE}	
Loreena McKennitt: No Journey's End	March 3, 2000	March 2, 2003		^{APT WORLDWIDE}	
Loreena McKennitt: No Journey's End	October 3, 2004	October 2, 2016		^{APT WORLDWIDE}	
Nunsense	March 1, 1996	February 28, 1998			
Castles & Concerts: The Academy At Longleat	April 24, 1996	April 23, 1998			
Buddy Guy Live: The Real Deal	June 1, 1996	June 30, 1998			
The Neville Brothers Live in Concert	June 2, 1996	August 31, 1998			
Yehudi Menuhin, the Violin of the Century	August 4, 1996	August 3, 1998			
Sweet Honey in the Rock: Songs for the Children	September 1, 1996	December 31, 1998			
Country Music Women	September 1, 1996	August 31, 1998			
Ottmar Liebert + Luna Negra: Wide Eyed + Dreaming	September 8, 1996	September 30, 1998			
Nick Brignola in Concert	November 1, 1996	October 31, 1999			
Berdien Stenberg: Amadeus and Friends	December 1, 1996	November 30, 1998			
André Rieu: The Vienna I Love	December 1, 1996	December 31, 2000			
R.E.M.'s Road Movie	January 1, 1997	December 31, 1998			
The Brooklyn Tabernacle Choir: Live at Madison Square Garden	January 1, 1997	December 31, 1998			
Joe Cocker Organic	February 1, 1997	January 31, 1999			
Spirit of Scotland	February 1, 1997	January 31, 1999			
Nunsense 2: The Sequel	February 1, 1997	January 31, 1999			
The Bedfordshire Musical Pageant	February 1, 1997	January 31, 2000			
Suzanne Vega: Live at the El Rey	February 15, 1997	February 28, 1998			
Placido Domingo: The Covent Garden Gold & Silver Gala	February 23, 1997	December 31, 1998			
Lord of the Dance	March 1, 1997	February 1, 2000			
Gipsy Kings: Tierra Gitana Live in Concert	March 1, 1997	August 31, 1998			
Scottish Fiddle Orchestra at Royal Hall, London	March 1, 1997	June 30, 2000			
Lorie Line Live!	March 2, 1997	June 30, 2000			
Gipsy Kings: Live at Wolf Trap	March 9, 1997	March 8, 2000			
Those Were the Days	March 15, 1997	December 31, 1999			
Sunfest Music Festival XIV	June 30, 1997	August 31, 1999			
Pyromania (4th of July in Washington D.C.)	July 1, 1997	July 31, 1999	(Note: Also known as Pyromania.) (Note: Holiday genre in the 1st and 2nd releases.)		
Pyromania (4th of July in Washington D.C.)	July 1, 2001	July 31, 2005	(Note: Also known as Pyromania.) (Note: Holiday genre in the 1st and 2nd releases.)		
Pyromania (4th of July in Washington D.C.)	July 1, 2007	June 30, 2008	(Note: Also known as Pyromania.) (Note: Holiday genre in the 1st and 2nd releases.)		
Scotland on Parade: Live at Edinburgh Castle	August 1, 1997	July 31, 2002			
Berwick Military Tattoo	August 1, 1997	July 31, 2000			
Feel the Spirit: The Newark Boys Choir Down Under	August 1, 1997	July 31, 2000			
Raffi In Concert with the Rise & Shine Band	August 1, 1997	July 31, 1999			
Art Garfunkel Across America	August 1, 1997	July 31, 1999			
Ancient Pulsing with Tommy Makem	August 3, 1997	August 2, 2000			
Kodo, The Drummers of Japan: Hosted by Mickey Hart	August 9, 1997	May 31, 2000			
Abbado & Pavarotti at Ferrara	September 7, 1997	December 31, 2000	(Note: Also known as Abbado & Pavarotti: Ferrara Musica.)		
Jean-Michel Jarre: Live in Barcelona	September 28, 1997	October 31, 2000			
Newport Jazz Festival	November 1, 1997	October 31, 1999	(Note: Also known as Newport Jazz Festival 1997.)		
Bix Jazz Festival	November 9, 1997	November 8, 2000			
Scottish Fiddle Orchestra Plays Toronto	November 22, 1997	December 31, 1999			
Voices of Scotland	November 23, 1997	December 1, 2000			
Steve Allen's 75th Birthday Celebration	November 28, 1997	December 31, 2002			
Tap Dogs	November 29, 1997	December 28, 2000			
Songs from the Heart of the Adirondacks	December 1, 1997	November 30, 2000			
Ying Quartet: An Iowa Experience	December 28, 1997	August 31, 2000			
The Bridge	January 1, 1998	January 1, 1999			
Rita MacNeil's Celtic Celebration	March 7, 1998	March 6, 2002			
Sunfest Smoothies: The Flavors of Jazz	April 5, 1998	April 4, 2001			
Bryan Adams: MTV Unplugged	August 1, 1998	July 31, 1999			
Last Night of the Proms '97	August 1, 1998	July 31, 2000			
The Band	August 1, 1998	August 31, 2000			
Emmylou Harris... Spyboy	August 1, 1998	November 30, 2000			
Bob Hope: Hollywood's Brightest Star	November 1, 1998	February 28, 2002	(Note: Originally biography genre.)		
Bob Hope: Hollywood's Brightest Star	August 1, 2003	July 31, 2005	(Note: Originally biography genre.)		
Feet of Flames	December 1, 1998	January 1, 2001			
Michael Bolton My Secret Passion: Live from Catania	December 1, 1998	November 30, 2001			
Hildegard of Bingen: Ordo Virtutum The Ritual of the Virtues	December 1, 1998	November 30, 2000			
Divas Live	December 1, 1998	March 31, 1999			
Lullaby of Harlem	February 1, 1999	January 31, 2001			
Styx: Return to Paradise Theatre	February 19, 1999	March 31, 2004			
David Crosby & CPR "Through the Music"	March 1, 1999	February 28, 2001			
Eros Ramazzotti & Friends: Live from Munich	March 1, 1999	February 28, 2001			
Southwest Symphony	March 1, 1999	February 28, 2010			
Harold Arlen: Somewhere Over the Rainbow	March 1, 1999	March 31, 2001			
Squirrel Nut Zippers Live	March 1, 1999	March 31, 2001			
Green Fire & Ice	March 1, 1999	August 31, 2002			
Thumbnail Theatre's Macbeth	May 1, 1999	April 30, 2002			
Kirk Franklin Nu Nation Tour	May 23, 1999	May 22, 2002			
Tango Magic	June 1, 1999	June 30, 2002			
Lynyrd Skynyrd: Lyve from Steel Town	August 1, 1999	July 31, 2005			
The Crooners	August 7, 1999	August 6, 2002			
Ballroom Fever: In Concert from the Imperial Palace in Vienna	October 1, 1999	November 30, 2000	(Note: Originally titled Ballroom Dance Champions: In Concert from the Imperial Palace in Vienna.)		
Sarah McLachlan: Mirrorball	November 5, 1999	November 4, 2004			
It's Doo-Wop Singing with Harvey Holiday!	November 11, 1999	December 31, 2003	(Note: Exchange. Formatted for pledge.)		
Swing It!	November 26, 1999	March 31, 2002			
Lyle Lovett: Going Home	December 1, 1999	December 31, 2000			
Finbar Wright in Concert	December 1, 1999	November 30, 2001			

==== 2000s ====
Title	Premiere date	End date	Note(s)	Legend(s)	Source(s)
Message to Love: The Isle of Wight Festival	January 1, 2000	February 29, 2000			
Bjorn Again: Live at the Royal Albert Hall	March 1, 2000	February 28, 2002			
Bjorn Again: Live at the Royal Albert Hall	March 1, 2005	February 28, 2007			
An Audience with Tom Jones	March 1, 2000	February 28, 2002			
Hollywood's Magic Night	March 20, 2000	March 31, 2001		^{APT WORLDWIDE}	
Hevia Live in Madrid	April 21, 2000	April 20, 2005			
Sunfest '99	May 1, 2000	April 30, 2002			
Frankie Laine Live — The European Concert*	June 1, 2000	May 31, 2002			
Rock & Roll Graffiti	June 1, 2000	May 31, 2002			
Land of Dreams: Randy Newman's America	June 30, 2000	June 29, 2002			
Live from Heaven: Eurythmics	July 1, 2000	June 30, 2002			
Appalachian Journey	August 3, 2000	August 31, 2001			
Short Trip Home	September 3, 2000	January 1, 2008			
The Three Tenors Christmas	November 23, 2000	December 31, 2003	(Note: Premium Service 11. Available in standard and pledge versions.)		
Sting: Brand New Day Live at Universal Amphitheatre	November 23, 2000	December 31, 2002			
Manilow Live!	November 25, 2000	December 31, 2002			
Tina Turner on the Road	December 1, 2000	November 30, 2002			
Diana Krall Trio	December 1, 2000	November 30, 2002			
Umm Kulthum: A Voice Like Egypt	December 1, 2000	November 30, 2002			
Hey La! Hey La! The Girl Groups Are Back!	March 1, 2001	March 31, 2004			
The Irish Tenors Ellis Island	March 12, 2001	March 31, 2004			
The Irish Tenors Ellis Island	March 1, 2005	March 31, 2007			
Hollywood Musicals of the 1960s	June 30, 2001	June 29, 2003			
Wired for Sound: A Guitar Odyssey	June 30, 2001	June 29, 2003			
Pearl Jam: Touring Band 2000	June 30, 2001	May 31, 2002			
Mickey Hart: Planet Drum	July 13, 2001	March 31, 2006			
Russell Watson: The Voice	August 1, 2001	August 31, 2004			
The Moody Blues at the Royal Albert Hall	August 1, 2001	August 31, 2003			
The Moody Blues at the Royal Albert Hall	September 1, 2003	August 31, 2005			
The Moody Blues at the Royal Albert Hall	March 1, 2007	February 28, 2009			
The Moody Blues at the Royal Albert Hall	May 1, 2009	September 4, 2010			
The Moody Blues at the Royal Albert Hall	October 1, 2012	September 30, 2014			
The Moody Blues at the Royal Albert Hall	December 1, 2014	November 30, 2016			
The Moody Blues at the Royal Albert Hall	March 1, 2017	February 28, 2019			
CeCe Winans Live in Concert from the Lamb's Theatre in New York	August 1, 2001	December 31, 2004			
Gene Pitney on Stage	November 1, 2001	November 30, 2003			
The Newport Jazz Festival 2001	November 2, 2001	November 1, 2004			
Mythodea	November 23, 2001	December 31, 2004			
Tim Janis: An American Composer in Concert	November 23, 2001	December 31, 2004			
Happy Holidays: The Best of the Andy Williams Christmas Shows	November 23, 2001	December 31, 2003	(Note: Holiday genre in the 1st release.)		
Happy Holidays: The Best of the Andy Williams Christmas Shows	November 26, 2005	December 31, 2006	(Note: Holiday genre in the 1st release.)		
Happy Holidays: The Best of the Andy Williams Christmas Shows	November 28, 2008	December 28, 2010	(Note: Holiday genre in the 1st release.)		
Happy Holidays: The Best of the Andy Williams Christmas Shows	November 23, 2012	December 28, 2015	(Note: Holiday genre in the 1st release.)		
Voices, A Musical Celebration	November 24, 2001	December 31, 2004			
Simon & Garfunkel: The Concert in Central Park	November 24, 2001	December 20, 2003			
Blue Suede Shoes: A Rockabilly Session with Carl Perkins and Friends	March 1, 2002	February 29, 2004			
Blue Suede Shoes: A Rockabilly Session with Carl Perkins and Friends	November 1, 2016	October 31, 2018			
U2: Live at Red Rocks: "Under a Blood Red Sky"	March 1, 2002	February 29, 2004			
Fury	March 2, 2002	March 31, 2005			
Let's Do It Again!	March 2, 2002	December 31, 2003			
Into His Hands: A Vienna Philharmonic Memorial Concert	March 30, 2002	March 29, 2006			
Hollywood Musicals of the 1950s	April 1, 2002	March 31, 2004			
Mark Erelli: The Memorial Hall Recordings	May 17, 2002	May 16, 2007	(Note: Originally music/documentary genre.)		
The Synchronicity Concert	June 30, 2002	June 29, 2004			
Jam Miami	July 1, 2002	June 30, 2005			
Three Dog Night: Live with the Tennessee Symphony Orchestra	August 1, 2002	August 31, 2004			
Newport Jazz Festival 2002	November 1, 2002	October 31, 2005			
Russell Watson: Now Is the Hour	November 29, 2002	December 31, 2005			
Mario Frangoulis: Sometimes I Dream	November 29, 2002	December 31, 2005			
Sinatra: The Classic Duets	November 29, 2002	December 31, 2004			
Nunsense 3: The Jamboree	December 1, 2002	November 30, 2004			
Concordia College Christmas Concert: "O Holy Night"	December 1, 2002	November 30, 2006			
Christmas with Chanticleer	December 13, 2002	December 12, 2006			
America Welcomes the World! Cultural Olympiad Concerts	January 3, 2003	March 30, 2006			
When I Fall in Love: The One & Only Nat King Cole	February 27, 2003	March 31, 2005			
Sade: Lovers Live	March 1, 2003	February 28, 2005			
Will the Circle Be Unbroken: Farther Along	March 1, 2003	March 31, 2006			
Suzanne Ciani and the Wave	March 2, 2003	March 1, 2007			
The Kingston Trio & Friends Reunion 1981	May 1, 2003	April 30, 2005			
Bob Hope: The Road to Laughter	May 28, 2003	June 30, 2006			
An Audience with Donny Osmond	June 30, 2003	June 29, 2005			
Teddy Pendergrass: From Teddy with Love - 2002	June 30, 2003	June 29, 2005			
Hey, Hey We're the Monkees	June 30, 2003	June 29, 2006			
Hollywood Bowl: Music Under the Stars	July 1, 2003	June 30, 2012			
Three Men and a Tenor	August 1, 2003	July 31, 2006			
Connie Dover & Roger Landes in Concert	August 1, 2003	July 31, 2009			
James Brown Live from the House of Blues	September 1, 2003	August 31, 2005			
Sinéad O'Connor: Live at Vicar Street Dublin	September 20, 2003	May 31, 2005			
Newport Jazz Festival 2003	November 1, 2003	October 31, 2006			
Giovanni Live from Las Vegas	November 1, 2003	December 31, 2005			
The 19th Annual Fort Lauderdale Christmas Pageant	November 1, 2003	December 31, 2003			
Full Sails	November 2, 2003	November 1, 2007			
The Raleigh Ringers: One Winter Evening at Meymandi - A Holiday Special	November 23, 2003	November 22, 2015	(Note: Planned to be holiday genre.)		
James Taylor: Pull Over	November 28, 2003	December 31, 2004			
Purdue University Christmas Show 2002	November 28, 2003	December 31, 2003	(Note: Planned to be 21-part series.)		
A Chanukah Celebration	December 1, 2003	February 28, 2010	(Note: Planned to be art & culture genre.)		
The Neville Brothers	February 1, 2004	January 31, 2006			
Hollywood's Magic Night 2004	February 19, 2004	February 28, 2005		^{APT WORLDWIDE}	
Tim Janis: Beautiful America	February 28, 2004	February 27, 2007			
Tim Janis: Beautiful America	November 21, 2011	November 20, 2013			
Daylight, Moonlight: Kitaro Live in Yakushiji	February 29, 2004	February 28, 2009	(Note: Planned to end on February 28, 2010.)		
Cher: The Farewell Tour	March 1, 2004	February 28, 2005			
Andy Williams: My Favorite Duets	March 1, 2004	March 31, 2007			
Ringo Starr & His All-Starr Band 2003	March 1, 2004	February 28, 2006			
A Passover Celebration	March 28, 2004	June 30, 2013			
Acrobats & Maniacs	April 1, 2004	March 31, 2006			
The Life of Jesus Christ	April 1, 2004	April 30, 2004	(Note: 2004 version.)		
The Legacy of Jim Croce	June 1, 2004	June 30, 2007	(Note: Originally titled Jim Croce.)		
John Mayall & the Bluesbreakers: 70th Birthday Concert	June 30, 2004	June 29, 2006			
Brian Wilson Presents: Pet Sounds Live in London	August 1, 2004	July 31, 2006			
Sammy Davis Jr. Singing at His Best	August 1, 2004	July 31, 2006			
The Wall: Berlin 90	August 1, 2004	July 31, 2006			
Klezmer Musicians Travel "Home" to Krakow	August 12, 2004	August 11, 2006			
Stormy Weather: The Music of Harold Arlen	August 14, 2004	August 13, 2006			
The Zombies Live at the Bloomsbury Theatre: London	October 20, 2004	December 31, 2005			
Newport Jazz Festival 2004	November 1, 2004	October 31, 2007			
A Cockman Family Christmas: Maker of the Stars	November 21, 2004	November 20, 2007			
Christmas at the Hollywood Palace	November 27, 2004	December 31, 2007			
The Morgan Choir: A Joyful Celebration	November 27, 2004	December 31, 2007			
The Ten Tenors: Larger than Life	November 27, 2004	December 31, 2007	(Note: Originally titled The Ten Tenors: Live at the Lyrics.)	^{APT WORLDWIDE}	
The Grateful Dead Movie	November 27, 2004	March 31, 2006			
A Christmas Tradition with Tommy Makem	November 28, 2004	November 27, 2016			
The Purdue University Christmas Show 2003	November 28, 2004	December 31, 2004			
Lesley Garrett Live at Christmas	December 1, 2004	December 31, 2006			
Buddy Rich: The Channel One Set	December 1, 2004	November 30, 2006			
Live at Carnegie Hall, My Favourite Broadway: The Leading Ladies	December 1, 2004	November 30, 2006	(Note: Distributed by PBS (as part of Great Performances Season 27).)		
The Saw Doctors in Concert: Live from Galway	December 1, 2004	November 30, 2006			
Indigo Christmas with Nathaniel Dett Chorale	December 1, 2004	November 30, 2006			
A Night Out with... The Funk Brothers	February 1, 2005	January 31, 2007			
The Newport Jazz Festival 1954-2004: Fiftieth Anniversary	February 1, 2005	January 31, 2008			
The Life & Times of Foster and Allen	February 19, 2005	February 18, 2008			
Waves	March 1, 2005	February 28, 2010			
The Grand Ole Opry's Vintage Classics	March 1, 2005	March 31, 2008			
Live Aid: The Day the Music Changed the World	March 1, 2005	March 31, 2008			
Sentimental Piano with Enrique Chia	March 4, 2005	November 30, 2006			
An Evening with Wood's Tea Company	March 5, 2005	March 4, 2009			
George Burns in Concert	March 11, 2005	December 31, 2007			
Peter Gabriel Live: Growing Up	April 1, 2005	March 31, 2007			
Shari's Passover Surprise	April 1, 2005	March 31, 2007			
My Girlfriends Quilt	April 10, 2005	April 9, 2017			
Patsy Cline: Sweet Dreams Still	June 1, 2005	June 30, 2008	(Note: Originally titled Patsy Cline Anthology.)		
Newport Jazz Festival 2005	November 13, 2005	November 12, 2009			
The Concert for Bangladesh Revisited with George Harrison and Friends	November 25, 2005	November 24, 2007			
Gloria Estefan Live & Unwrapped	November 25, 2005	November 24, 2007			
Randy Travis Live!	November 25, 2005	November 24, 2007			
Ballet Internationale: The Nutcracker	November 25, 2005	December 31, 2006			
Liam Lawton in Concert	November 26, 2005	December 31, 2007			
Loggins and Messina: Sittin' in Again	November 26, 2005	December 15, 2008			
The Brian Setzer Orchestra Christmas Extravaganza	November 26, 2005	December 31, 2005			
Rondò Veneziano Live in Las Vegas	November 27, 2005	November 26, 2007			
Love & Murder	January 1, 2006	December 31, 2009			
Tim Janis: Coastal America	February 18, 2006	February 17, 2012			
Avi Hoffman's Too Jewish?	February 19, 2006	February 18, 2010			
Avi Hoffman's Too Jewish, Too!	February 20, 2006	February 19, 2010			
Broadway: The Golden Age	March 1, 2006	March 31, 2007			
Broadway: The Golden Age	June 30, 2007	June 29, 2009			
Johnny Cash Live at Montreux 1994	March 1, 2006	February 29, 2008			
James Last: Gentleman of Music	March 1, 2006	February 29, 2008			
Chicago / Earth, Wind & Fire: Live at the Greek Theatre	June 1, 2006	February 29, 2008			
Chicago / Earth, Wind & Fire: Live at the Greek Theatre	May 29, 2009	June 30, 2010			
Marty Robbins: Seems Like Yesterday	June 1, 2006	June 30, 2009			
Marty Robbins: Seems Like Yesterday	November 1, 2009	October 31, 2011			
Pink Martini Live: Discover the World	June 1, 2006	June 30, 2008			
Andrea Bocelli: A Night in Tuscany	June 30, 2006	June 29, 2008			
The Raleigh Ringers: In Concert	July 2, 2006	July 1, 2016			
Soweto Gospel Choir: Live in Concert	September 1, 2006	August 31, 2008			
Newport Jazz Festival 2006	November 1, 2006	October 31, 2010			
Live from the Seminole Hard Rock Featuring James Blunt with Special Guests the Fray	November 17, 2006	November 16, 2008			
A Holiday Music Gala	November 19, 2006	November 18, 2014			
Electric Company's Greatest Hits & Bits	November 25, 2006	December 15, 2009			
Sinatra: Vegas Live from Caesars Palace	November 25, 2006	December 20, 2008			
Jimi Hendrix Live at Woodstock	November 25, 2006	December 31, 2007			
O Come, All Ye Faithful: Concordia College Christmas Concert	November 26, 2006	November 25, 2012			
The Nutcracker	December 1, 2006	December 31, 2009			
Kenny Wayne Shepherd: Ten Days Out: Blues from the Backroads	December 1, 2006	November 30, 2008			
Omara Portuondo	December 1, 2006	November 30, 2008			
The King's Singers: From Byrd to the Beatles	December 1, 2006	November 30, 2008			
Frankie Laine: An American Dreamer	December 1, 2006	November 30, 2008			
Carols from King's: A Celebration of Christmas	December 1, 2006	January 31, 2008			
Quartetto Gelato: A Concert in Wine Country	January 1, 2007	December 31, 2014			
Jazz Icons: Ella Fitzgerald Live In '57 & '63	February 1, 2007	January 31, 2009			
We Are...The Laurie Berkner Band	March 1, 2007	March 31, 2009			
Yusuf Islam: A Few Good Songs	March 1, 2007	February 28, 2009			
Keyboard Creole: 2005 New Orleans Jazz & Heritage Festival	March 1, 2007	February 28, 2009			
The Lovin' Spoonful with John Sebastian: A Lovin' Look Back	March 1, 2007	March 31, 2010			
The Lovin' Spoonful with John Sebastian: A Lovin' Look Back	December 1, 2010	November 30, 2012			
Zu & Co: Live at the Royal Albert Hall	June 1, 2007	August 31, 2009			
Glen Campbell: Good Times Again	June 30, 2007	June 30, 2010			
Jimmy Buckley Live in Concert	July 29, 2007	August 31, 2010			
A View from Space with Heavenly Music	August 1, 2007	July 31, 2009		^{APT WORLDWIDE}	
A Guitarscape Planet	August 1, 2007	July 31, 2009		^{APT WORLDWIDE}	
A Tribute to the King of Rock & Roll	August 1, 2007	July 31, 2009			
Anuna: Celtic Origins	August 1, 2007	July 31, 2017			
The Saint Louis Brass Quintet Live in Concert	September 16, 2007	September 15, 2015			
Angel Voices: Libera in Concert	November 23, 2007	December 31, 2010	(Note: Originally titled Angel Voices.)		
Holiday Homecoming with Angela Brown	November 23, 2007	November 22, 2010			
Help! The Movie	November 23, 2007	November 22, 2008			
The 23rd Annual Fort Lauderdale Christmas Pageant	November 23, 2007	December 31, 2007			
Pavarotti in Central Park	November 23, 2007	November 22, 2009			
Pavarotti in Central Park	November 1, 2012	October 31, 2014			
Rufus! Rufus! Rufus! Does Judy! Judy! Judy!	December 1, 2007	November 30, 2009			
A Christmas Celtic Sojourn Live	December 1, 2007	November 30, 2017			
A Holly Jolly Pops Holiday with Barenaked Ladies	December 16, 2007	December 15, 2010			
Forever Tango with Luis Bravo	March 1, 2008	March 31, 2010	(Note: Originally titled Forever Tango with Luis Bravo: Live from Teatro Coliseo Podestá.)		
Zappa Plays Zappa	June 1, 2008	June 30, 2010			
Zappa Plays Zappa	August 1, 2011	July 31, 2013			
Valparaiso University Christmas Concert	November 23, 2008	November 22, 2014			
Anúna: Christmas Memories	November 23, 2008	January 22, 2015			
Loreena McKennitt: A Moveable Musical Feast	December 1, 2008	November 30, 2017		^{APT WORLDWIDE}	
From Heart to Heart: Beethoven's Plea to Peace	December 1, 2008	November 30, 2012			
Opera Louisiane	January 4, 2009	January 3, 2017			
Dudu Fisher: In Concert from Israel	February 22, 2009	February 21, 2013			
Pavarotti: Salute Petra	March 1, 2009	April 1, 2012			
Bellydance Superstars: Live in Paris at the Folies Bergère	April 5, 2009	April 4, 2012			
Soulful Symphony with Darin Atwater: Song in a Strange Land	July 26, 2009	July 25, 2017			
America's Veterans: A Musical Tribute 2009	November 1, 2009	October 31, 2015			
Marina at West Point: Unity through Diversity	November 8, 2009	November 7, 2015			
Liza's at The Palace....	November 27, 2009	December 31, 2011			

==== 2010s ====
Title	Premiere date	End date	Note(s)	Legend(s)	Source(s)
The Legendary Bing Crosby	February 27, 2010	March 31, 2013			
The Celtic Tenors: No Boundaries	March 1, 2010	February 28, 2018			
Leonard Cohen Live at the Isle of Wight 1970	March 1, 2010	March 31, 2011			
From Gershwin to Garland a Musical Journey with Richard Glazier	May 2, 2010	May 1, 2014			
John Denver Rocky Mountain High Live in Japan	June 1, 2010	May 31, 2012			
Andy Williams: Moon River and Me	June 30, 2010	August 31, 2013			
Rolling Stones: Live at the Max	September 1, 2010	September 30, 2012			
America's Veterans: A Musical Tribute 2010	November 1, 2010	October 31, 2016			
Music of Majestic Spirit	November 7, 2010	November 6, 2013			
Ronan Tynan: More Than Magic	November 18, 2010	November 17, 2016			
Johnny Mathis: Wonderful, Wonderful!	November 26, 2010	December 31, 2012			
Johnny Mathis: Wonderful, Wonderful!	February 22, 2024	March 31, 2026			
The Moody Blues: Live from the Greek Theatre	December 1, 2010	November 30, 2012			
Jan Mulder in Concert	December 1, 2010	November 30, 2016			
A Bucknell Candlelight Christmas	December 1, 2010	November 30, 2018			
Forever Plaid	February 23, 2011	December 31, 2011	(Note: Planned to end on February 22, 2013.)		
Primal Twang: The Legacy of the Guitar	March 1, 2011	February 28, 2013			
The Rat Pack: Live & Swingin'	March 1, 2011	March 31, 2012			
Darlene Love: The Concert of Love	March 1, 2011	March 31, 2013			
They Came to Play	April 1, 2011	March 31, 2013			
Lang Lang in Vienna	April 1, 2011	March 31, 2013			
Petula Clark: This Is My Song	April 1, 2011	March 31, 2013			
Bee Gees: One Night Only	August 1, 2011	August 31, 2013			
Bee Gees: One Night Only	March 1, 2014	April 1, 2016			
Bee Gees: One Night Only	June 1, 2016	June 30, 2018			
Bee Gees: One Night Only	July 1, 2018	July 31, 2020			
Bee Gees: One Night Only	November 23, 2020	December 31, 2022			
Bee Gees: One Night Only	August 10, 2023	September 30, 2025			
Do It Again	August 1, 2011	July 31, 2013			
Toda una Vida: Cuban Masterworks - Albita	August 30, 2011	August 29, 2013			
America's Veterans: A Musical Tribute 2011	November 1, 2011	October 31, 2017			
Music of Your Life with Les Brown, Jr. and His Band of Renown Starring Neal Mccoy	November 25, 2011	December 24, 2014			
Lennon Sisters: Same Song, Separate Voices	November 26, 2011	December 31, 2014			
Lennon Sisters: Same Song, Separate Voices	November 27, 2020	December 31, 2022			
The Zombies: Odessey & Oracle 40th Anniversary Concert	December 1, 2011	November 30, 2013			
Elaine Stritch at Liberty	December 1, 2011	November 30, 2013			
Christmas Carols with the Priests	December 1, 2011	December 31, 2013			
Rock 'n' Soul Holiday Concert	December 1, 2011	November 30, 2014			
L.A. Holiday Celebration 2011	December 7, 2011	December 6, 2014			
Wilderness Plots: In Concert	February 1, 2012	January 31, 2016			
John Tesh Big Band Live	March 1, 2012	March 31, 2015			
The Best of Soul Train	March 1, 2012	March 31, 2014			
Angelique Kidjo and Friends: Spirit Rising	March 1, 2012	March 31, 2014			
Diana Ross: For One and For All	March 1, 2012	February 28, 2015	(Note: Originally titled Diana Ross: Live in Central Park.)		
Richard Glazier in Concert: From Ragtime to Reel Time	March 1, 2012	February 28, 2016			
An Evening with Dave Grusin	March 4, 2012	March 3, 2014			
Lindsey Buckingham: Songs from the Small Machine	April 1, 2012	March 31, 2014			
Nobel Peace Prize Concert 2011	April 15, 2012	April 14, 2014			
Amy Winehouse at Her Best: When Amy Came to Dingle	November 1, 2012	October 31, 2013			
Mormon Tabernacle Choir Presents The Joy of Song with Katherine Jenkins	November 4, 2012	November 3, 2015			
Candles & Carols	November 5, 2012	November 4, 2013			
The 28th Annual Fort Lauderdale Christmas Pageant	November 15, 2012	December 31, 2012			
Rick Steves Special: A Symphonic Journey	January 24, 2013	January 23, 2016	(Note: 2013 version.)	^{APT WORLDWIDE}	
Great Big Sea: Courage & Patience & Grit	February 1, 2013	May 31, 2015	(Note: Planned to end on May 31, 2016.)		
Cherish the Ladies: An Irish Homecoming	March 1, 2013	March 31, 2015			
The Who Live in Texas '75	March 1, 2013	March 31, 2015			
Tom Lehrer: Live in Oslo 1967	March 1, 2013	March 31, 2015			
The Hollies: Look Through Any Window 1963-1975	June 1, 2013	June 30, 2015			
2Cellos: Live at Arena Zagreb	August 1, 2013	July 31, 2016			
Out of Many, One	October 1, 2013	September 30, 2017			
Shaun Johnson Big Band Experience: The Spirit of the Season	November 15, 2013	November 14, 2017			
Purdue Christmas Show 2012	November 24, 2013	November 23, 2014			
Anderson University's Candles & Carols	November 24, 2013	November 23, 2014			
George Michael: Live in London	November 29, 2013	June 30, 2016			
A St. Thomas Christmas: All Is Well 2013	December 20, 2013	December 19, 2015			
Crosby, Stills & Nash 2012	March 1, 2014	June 30, 2016			
Paul McCartney and Wings: Rockshow	March 1, 2014	April 1, 2016			
An Evening with Doc Watson & David Holt	March 1, 2014	February 29, 2016			
Thank You Les Paul	April 1, 2014	March 31, 2016			
Liberace Live with the London Philharmonic Orchestra	June 1, 2014	June 30, 2016			
Smokey Robinson and The Miracles: The Definitive Performances	June 1, 2014	June 30, 2016			
Loreena McKennitt: Nights from the Alhambra	November 2, 2014	November 30, 2025		^{APT WORLDWIDE}	
Joshua Bell Presents Musical Gifts	November 16, 2014	December 25, 2016			
The 30th Annual Fort Lauderdale Christmas Pageant	November 20, 2014	December 31, 2014			
Dailey & Vincent: Alive!	February 22, 2015	February 21, 2017			
Lindsey Stirling: Live from London	March 1, 2015	March 31, 2017	(Note: Originally titled Lindsey Stirling.)		
Sing Out! Icons of Folk	March 1, 2015	March 31, 2017			
Pat Benatar & Neil Giraldo: The 35th Anniversary Tour	March 1, 2015	June 30, 2017			
A Celebration of Peace Through Music	March 29, 2015	March 28, 2018			
The Newport Effect: Newport Folk Festival	May 1, 2015	April 30, 2017			
The Best of the Boston Pops	May 2, 2015	May 1, 2018			
Alfio in Concert	August 4, 2015	September 3, 2018			
Keith & Kristyn Getty: Joy An Irish Christmas	November 1, 2015	October 31, 2017			
George Perris: Live in New York from Jazz at Lincoln Center	November 1, 2015	October 31, 2018			
The Rolling Stones from the Vault: The Marquee — Live in 1971	November 27, 2015	December 26, 2017			
A St. Thomas Christmas: Jubilant Light 2015	December 19, 2015	December 18, 2017			
Music City Roots Presents the IBMA Awards	January 1, 2016	December 31, 2016			
Anderson Ponty Band: Better Late Than Never	March 1, 2016	February 28, 2018			
Salut Salon: Classically Seduced	March 1, 2016	March 31, 2018			
Mestiza Music	May 1, 2016	April 30, 2020			
Tim Rushlow & His Big Band: Live	June 1, 2016	June 30, 2018			
The Beach Boys Good Timin': Live in Concert Knebworth, England 1980	June 1, 2016	June 30, 2018			
From the Wings: The Live Art Story	August 1, 2016	July 31, 2019			
Graham Nash Live	August 22, 2016	September 30, 2019			
Under the Streetlamp: Rockin' Round the Clock	August 24, 2016	August 23, 2022			
The 32nd Annual Fort Lauderdale Christmas Pageant	November 15, 2016	December 31, 2016			
Christmastime in New Orleans	November 21, 2016	November 20, 2025		^{CREATE}	
Jordan Smith 'Tis the Season	November 27, 2016	December 31, 2017			
Santana IV	December 1, 2016	September 30, 2019			
Happy Holidays with the Boston Pops	December 1, 2016	December 31, 2020		^{APT WORLDWIDE}	
Bailamos!	February 5, 2017	February 4, 2018			
Heart — Live at the Royal Albert Hall with the Royal Philharmonic Orchestra	March 1, 2017	March 31, 2019			
Dudu Fisher in Jerusalem	March 1, 2017	March 31, 2019			
Christopher Cross & Friends	March 1, 2017	February 28, 2019			
Gregory Porter: Live in Berlin	March 3, 2017	March 31, 2019			
Celtic Roots Live with Nathan Carter	June 1, 2017	June 30, 2019			
Jonas Kaufmann: My Italy	June 1, 2017	May 31, 2020			
Pink Floyd The Early Years 1965–1972	June 30, 2017	June 29, 2019			
Carole King: Tapestry Live in Hyde Park, London	August 1, 2017	August 31, 2019			
2Cellos Live from the Sydney Opera House	August 1, 2017	August 31, 2019			
Opera Reimagined: Animating the Cunning Little Vixen	September 7, 2017	September 6, 2020			
Christmas at Concordia: Gather Us In, O Child of Peace	November 19, 2017	November 18, 2025			
Christmas at Susquehanna: The 50th Anniversary Candlelight Service	November 19, 2017	December 31, 2020			
Christmas in Christ Chapel at Gustavus	November 23, 2017	December 31, 2019			
Wheaton College Christmas Festival: Love Divine	November 24, 2017	December 31, 2019			
The Everly Brothers: Harmonies from Heaven	November 27, 2017	March 31, 2020			
The Everly Brothers: Harmonies from Heaven	August 10, 2023	September 30, 2025			
Mario Lanza: The Best of Everything	December 1, 2017	November 30, 2019			
A St. Thomas Christmas: So Bright the Star	December 22, 2017	December 21, 2019			
An Evening With Carrie Newcomer	January 27, 2018	January 26, 2021			
Hans Zimmer: Live in Prague	March 1, 2018	March 31, 2020			
Leonard Cohen: Tower of Song	June 1, 2018	June 30, 2020			
Buddy Holly: Rave On	June 1, 2018	June 30, 2020			
Paul Thorn's Mission Temple Fireworks Revival	July 1, 2018	June 30, 2021			
Mantovani: The King of Strings	August 1, 2018	August 31, 2020			
U.S. Marine Band: An All-Star Orchestra Special	October 23, 2018	October 22, 2022			
Sinatra in Concert at Royal Festival Hall	November 1, 2018	June 30, 2021			
Sinatra in Concert at Royal Festival Hall	August 1, 2021	August 31, 2023			
Christmas At St. Olaf: Ris'n with Healing in His Wings	November 21, 2018	November 20, 2020			
Joni Mitchell Live at the Isle of Wight Festival 1970	November 23, 2018	December 31, 2020			
Christmas in Christ Chapel at Gustavus: Visions of Divine Mystery 2018	November 25, 2018	December 31, 2020			
Sinatra in Japan	January 1, 2019	March 31, 2021			
Karen, So Close	March 1, 2019	March 31, 2021			
Livingston Taylor Live From Sellersville Theater: Songs and Stories	March 1, 2019	March 31, 2021			
Livingston Taylor Live From Sellersville Theater: Songs and Stories	April 1, 2021	April 30, 2022			
Jeff Lynne's ELO: Live in Hyde Park	March 1, 2019	March 31, 2021			
Dick Van Dyke: A Celebration	March 1, 2019	March 31, 2021			
Live Art: Love	April 2, 2019	April 1, 2022			
In Flight: The Art of Ice Dance International	April 3, 2019	April 2, 2021			
Waylon Jennings: The Outlaw Performance	June 1, 2019	June 30, 2022			
Best of the Buddy Rich Show	June 3, 2019	August 31, 2021			
George Perris: Live at the Acropolis	June 18, 2019	June 30, 2022			
Little Steven and the Disciples of Soul: Soulfire Live!	June 23, 2019	August 31, 2022			
John Legend Plays Baloise Session	August 1, 2019	August 31, 2022			
An Opry Salute to Ray Charles	September 5, 2019	September 4, 2021			
Latin Fury	October 1, 2019	October 31, 2021			
Christmas at St. Paul's	November 1, 2019	October 31, 2021			
Yoshiki: Live at Carnegie Hall	November 1, 2019	October 31, 2026			
The 35th Annual Fort Lauderdale Christmas Pageant	November 24, 2019	December 31, 2019			
Carol Burnett: A Celebration	November 27, 2019	December 31, 2022			
America Live at the London Palladium	November 30, 2019	November 29, 2022			
London's New Year's Day Parade 2020	December 1, 2019	November 30, 2020			
A Classic Christmas with the Bach Festival Society	December 1, 2019	November 30, 2023			
Wheaton College Christmas Festival: Messiah, Prince of Peace	December 1, 2019	November 30, 2023			
A St. Thomas Christmas: Comfort and Joy	December 20, 2019	December 19, 2021			

==== 2020s ====
Title	Premiere date	End date	Note(s)	Legend(s)	Source(s)
The Martin Luther King Jr. Celebration Concert with the Cleveland Orchestra	January 1, 2020	December 31, 2022	(Note: Also known as The Martin Luther King.)		
Elvis: Aloha from Hawaii	February 1, 2020	January 31, 2021			
Dreams of Hope	February 4, 2020	February 3, 2026			
The Gennett Suite	February 11, 2020	February 10, 2023			
John Tesh: Songs and Stories from the Grand Piano	February 29, 2020	February 28, 2026			
Michael Kaeshammer: Boogie on the Blues Highway	February 29, 2020	February 28, 2023			
Mumford & Sons - Live from South Africa: Dust and Thunder	March 1, 2020	March 31, 2022			
Live Art: Family	April 10, 2020	April 9, 2022			
Discover The Firebird Suite	May 1, 2020	April 30, 2023		^{APT WORLDWIDE}	
The Kinks: Echoes of a World	May 1, 2020	April 30, 2022			
Fever: The Music of Peggy Lee	June 30, 2020	December 31, 2022			
Johnny Cash: Concert Behind Prison Walls	August 1, 2020	December 31, 2022			
Judy Collins: Winter Stories	August 1, 2020	December 31, 2022			
The American Pianists Awards 2019 Gala Finals	August 5, 2020	August 4, 2024			
London's New Year's Day Celebration 2021	December 1, 2020	November 30, 2021			
I Am Ireland	March 1, 2021	March 31, 2025			
Sam Cooke: Legend	May 28, 2021	June 30, 2024			
Mavis Staples: I'll Take You There - An All-Star Concert Celebration	June 1, 2021	May 31, 2023			
Genesis: The Last Domino?	September 1, 2021	September 30, 2023			
Eliades Ochoa: Live at Casa de la Trova	October 1, 2021	September 30, 2023		^{APT WORLDWIDE}	
Genesis: When in Rome 2007	November 1, 2021	October 31, 2023			
The Voodoo of Hell's Half-Acre: A Blues Poetry Opera	November 24, 2021	November 23, 2024			
The Wheaton College Christmas Festival: Through His Own Redeeming Love	December 1, 2021	November 30, 2023			
George Perris: A Sunset In Greece	December 15, 2021	December 30, 2025			
A St. Thomas Christmas: Bloom Eternal	December 19, 2021	December 18, 2023			
London's New Year's Day 2022	January 1, 2022	December 31, 2022			
Kenny Rogers Farewell Concert Celebration: All in for the Gambler	March 1, 2022	March 31, 2024			
The Outlaw Trail: Outlaws Rock	July 1, 2022	June 30, 2024			
James Taylor: One Man Band	August 1, 2022	August 31, 2024			
Music Videos That Shaped the 80s	November 1, 2022	October 31, 2024			
Sinatra: A Man and His Music + Ella + Jobim	November 1, 2022	October 31, 2024			
Michael Flatley's Lord of the Dance: The Impossible Tour	November 24, 2022	December 31, 2024			
London's New Year's Day Parade 2023: Welcome Back to London	December 1, 2022	November 30, 2023			
A Night of Georgia Music	February 1, 2023	June 30, 2025			
Rod Stewart — Live at Royal Albert Hall	February 23, 2023	March 22, 2025			
Luther Vandross — Always and Forever: An Evening of Songs at Royal Albert Hall	February 23, 2023	March 22, 2025			
Bob Dylan: Live in Newport 1963-1965	February 23, 2023	March 31, 2025			
Eudora's Fable: The Shoe Bird	March 1, 2023	February 28, 2025			
An Ozark Mountain Symphony: A Musical Celebration	April 1, 2023	March 31, 2026			
Discover Saint-Saëns' "Organ Symphony"	May 1, 2023	April 30, 2026			
Marvin Gaye: Greatest Hits Live	June 1, 2023	May 31, 2025			
Creedence Clearwater Revival At the Royal Albert Hall	June 1, 2023	May 31, 2025			
John Farnham and Olivia Newton-John — Two Strong Hearts	August 10, 2023	September 30, 2025			
Terence Blanchard in Dallas	November 1, 2023	October 31, 2025			
Cyndi Lauper Live... At Last	November 23, 2023	December 22, 2025			
Lang Lang: Favourite Melodies	November 23, 2023	December 31, 2025			
The Rolling Stones Rock and Roll Circus	November 23, 2023	December 31, 2025			
Love Train: The Sound of Philadelphia - Live in Concert	November 23, 2023	December 22, 2025			
London's New Year's Day Parade 2024	January 1, 2024	December 31, 2024			
American Pop Flashback! Great Hits of the '60s & '70s	February 22, 2024	March 31, 2026			
Chic Featuring Nile Rodgers Jazz a Vienne	February 22, 2024	March 31, 2026			
Gregg Allman Live: Back to Macon, GA	February 22, 2024	March 31, 2026			
The Freddie Mercury Tribute Concert	February 22, 2024	March 31, 2026			
Pictures at an Exhibition	March 1, 2024	February 28, 2026			
The Adventures of Peter and the Wolf	May 1, 2024	April 30, 2026			
Clive Davis: The Soundtrack of Our Lives	May 6, 2024	May 5, 2026			
Country's Legendary Duets	May 30, 2024	June 29, 2026			
Judy Collins: Wildflowers in Concert	May 30, 2024	June 30, 2026			
Charley Pride: I'm Just Me	July 1, 2024	June 30, 2026			
Tina Turner: One Last Time	August 10, 2024	September 30, 2026			
Fleetwood Mac: The Dance	August 10, 2024	September 9, 2026			
Soundwaves at the Bandshell	September 1, 2024	August 31, 2026			
The Eyes of the World: From D-Day to Ve Day	November 1, 2024	October 31, 2026			
London's New Year's Day Parade 2025	January 1, 2025	December 31, 2025			
Best of Rome New Year's Day Parade 2025	January 1, 2025	December 31, 2025			

=== Feature film ===
==== 1990s ====
Title	Premiere date	End date	Note(s)	Legend(s)	Source(s)
The King and I	July 1, 1993	August 31, 1993			
The Secret Life of Houses	November 23, 1994	November 22, 1996	(Note: As part of TV Families.)	^{ITVS}	
Terminal USA	November 23, 1994	November 22, 1996		^{ITVS}	
Family Remains	November 23, 1994	November 22, 1996		^{ITVS}	
Dottie Gets Spanked	November 23, 1994	November 22, 1996		^{ITVS}	
MOTV (My Own TV)	December 1, 1994	November 30, 1996		^{ITVS}	
A Psychic Mom	December 1, 1994	November 30, 1996		^{ITVS}	
Night Ride	December 1, 1994	November 30, 1996		^{ITVS}	
A Hard Day's Night	March 1, 1995	March 31, 1996			
Doctor Zhivago	November 1, 1995	November 30, 1998			
Kagemusha	February 1, 1998	April 30, 1998			
Monty Python Live at the Hollywood Bowl	March 1, 1998	May 31, 1998			
The Good, the Bad & the Beautiful	May 1, 1998	May 31, 2000			

==== 2000s ====
Title	Premiere date	End date	Note(s)	Legend(s)	Source(s)
The Lathe of Heaven	June 1, 2000	June 30, 2003	(Note: Originally drama genre.)		
Lord of the Flies	April 1, 2001	March 31, 2002			
A Century of Black Cinema	February 1, 2002	January 31, 2004			
My Left Foot	April 1, 2002	June 30, 2002			
Sounder	January 1, 2004	December 31, 2004			
Bonhoeffer: Agent of Grace	April 1, 2007	March 31, 2010			
Luther	May 1, 2007	April 30, 2010			
The Last Emperor	April 1, 2008	November 30, 2008			
The Last Emperor	July 1, 2013	June 30, 2014			
Casablanca	September 13, 2008	September 27, 2008			
March of the Penguins	March 1, 2009	March 31, 2009			

==== 2010s ====
Title	Premiere date	End date	Note(s)	Legend(s)	Source(s)
Black Like Me	February 1, 2014	February 29, 2016			
Fat Man and Little Boy	June 1, 2015	August 31, 2015			

==== 2020s ====
Title	Premiere date	End date	Note(s)	Legend(s)	Source(s)
Roald & Beatrix: The Tail of the Curious Mouse	December 1, 2023	November 30, 2025			

=== Holiday ===
==== 1980s ====
Title	Premiere date	End date	Note(s)	Legend(s)	Source(s)
Lights	December 2, 1984	December 31, 1986			
A Brandywine Christmas Carol	November 27, 1986	December 31, 1997			

==== 1990s ====
Title	Premiere date	End date	Note(s)	Legend(s)	Source(s)
A Celebration of Christmas	December 2, 1992	December 24, 2001			
The Andy Williams Christmas Show	November 26, 1993	December 31, 1996			
Passover: Traditions of Freedom	March 20, 1994	April 30, 1998			
Passover: Traditions of Freedom	April 1, 1999	April 30, 2002			
Father Christmas	November 27, 1994	November 26, 1998			
Perry Como's Irish Christmas	December 1, 1994	December 31, 2000	(Note: Originally titled Perry Como's 1994 Christmas Special - Live from Ireland.)		
Rob Mathes & Friends: I Want to Hear the Bells	December 1, 1995	December 31, 1997			
1995 Purdue University Christmas Show	November 24, 1996	December 31, 1996			
The Mannheim Steamroller Christmas Concert	November 27, 1996	December 31, 1996	(Note: Distributed by PBS in 1997.)		
Carreras Cole Domingo: A Celebration of Christmas Live from Vienna	December 1, 1996	December 31, 1998			
Spirit of Punxsutawney: Groundhog Day	February 1, 1997	February 28, 1999			
Mannheim Steamroller: A Renaissance Christmas!	November 28, 1997	December 31, 1997			
Christmas Is Coming	November 23, 1998	November 22, 1999			
Christmas Is Coming	November 25, 1999	November 24, 2000			
December's Dilemma: The Creche the Dreidel & the Star	November 27, 1999	December 31, 2001			
The 15th Annual Fort Lauderdale Christmas Pageant	November 27, 1999	December 31, 1999			
Santa Claus and the Magic Drum	November 28, 1999	November 27, 2001			
Christmas Glory	December 12, 1999	December 11, 2001			

==== 2000s ====
Title	Premiere date	End date	Note(s)	Legend(s)	Source(s)
Dublin St. Patrick's Day Millennium Parade	March 1, 2000	February 28, 2001			
The Life of Jesus Christ	April 1, 2000	April 30, 2001	(Note: 2000 version.)		
The 16th Annual Fort Lauderdale Christmas Pageant	November 19, 2000	December 31, 2000			
Sounds of the Season with Kathy Mattea	November 25, 2000	December 31, 2002			
Messiah XXI for a New Millennium	December 1, 2000	November 30, 2002			
Bethlehem Year Zero	December 1, 2000	December 31, 2002			
Our Favorite Things	November 23, 2001	December 31, 2004			
A Christmas Carol	December 1, 2001	December 31, 2003			
The Canadian Brass: A Christmas Experiment	November 24, 2002	December 31, 2004			
The 2001 Fort Lauderdale Christmas Pageant	November 24, 2002	December 31, 2002			
Purdue University Christmas Show 2001: A Norman Rockwell Christmas	November 24, 2002	December 31, 2002			
Tradición: A Holiday Celebration	December 1, 2002	December 31, 2006			
The Flint Street Nativity	December 1, 2002	December 31, 2005			
The Life of Jesus Christ	April 1, 2003	April 30, 2003	(Note: 2002 version.)		

== See also ==
- List of programs formerly distributed by American Public Television
- List of PBS member stations
- List of programs broadcast by PBS
- List of programs broadcast by PBS Kids
- List of programs broadcast by Create
- List of worldwide programs distributed by American Public Television
