= Sol-fa =

Sol-fa may refer to:

- Sol-fa (album), a 2004 album by Asian Kung-Fu Generation
- Solfège, a music education method
- Tonic sol-fa, a method of teaching sight-singing
- Tonic Sol-fa (a cappella group), a quartet from Minnesota
