= Broadway: The Music of Richard Rodgers =

The Music of Richard Rodgers

Studio album by Julie Andrews
- Released: 1994
- Genre: Show tune
- Label: Philips

Julie Andrews chronology
Putting It Together (1993)	The Music of Richard Rodgers (1994)	Victor/Victoria (1995)

The Music of Richard Rodgers (official title including the series name: Broadway: The Music of Richard Rodgers) is the eleventh studio album by English singer Julie Andrews. It was released in 1994 by Philips Records as the first in a planned series of Broadway-themed albums by Andrews, beginning with a tribute to composer Richard Rodgers.

Julie Andrews expressed deep appreciation for Richard Rodgers, with whom she shared a generous and supportive relationship, and highlighted the range of his collaborations on her album. The recording process was documented in a 1994 video that showcased her emotional connection to the material and her long-standing collaboration with conductor Ian Fraser.

Critics offered favorable reviews, some of them praised the album's polish and Andrews’ mature interpretations, while others gave it a moderate rating, noting fine orchestration and appeal for light music fans. The album had a short chart presence in Belgium and, though it didn't chart in the U.S., it achieved strong sales according to RPM magazine. In 1996, it was nominated for a Grammy Award for Best Traditional Pop Vocal Album.

== Background and production ==
The relationship between Rodgers and Andrews was marked by generosity. When she auditioned for him, he advised her to accept My Fair Lady if offered but asked to be informed if she wasn't chosen, as he wanted to work with her. Andrews deeply appreciated his support. Regarding the song selection of the album, Andrews revealed in an interview: "The miracle is that this album was written- it's Rodgers and Hart, Rodgers and Hammerstein, Rodgers and Sondheim, and Rodgers and Rodgers. He actually wrote one of the songs, the lyrics himself. But that one man wrote all those melodies is amazing to me".

The album was released in 1994 by Philips Records, and was the first in a series of Broadway-themed records that Philips proposed for the singer. It began with this tribute to Richard Rodgers, whom Andrews admires. It was released on both CD and tape cassette.

The making of the album was documented in a video titled Julie Andrews: The Making of Broadway - The Music of Richard Rodgers, capturing a 1994 London recording session. The film showcases Andrews' heartfelt interpretations of Rodgers' compositions, reflecting her deep connection to Broadway classics. It also highlights her remarkable 22-year collaboration with conductor Ian Fraser, as they meticulously refine each performance with shared artistry and insight. The video shows Andrews' joy and passion for the project, culminating in her lighthearted quip, "Not bad for an old mum!" after a playback.

== Critical reception ==
Professional ratings
Review scores
Source	Rating
AllMusic	3/5 stars
New Straits Times	Performance: Sound:

The editors from AllMusic rated the album three stars out of five but provided no written commentary.

Critic Piers Ford wrote that while Andrew's voice had darkened in places, her control and phrasing remained sharp, and her mature interpretation brought new depth to the material. He praised the album for its class and refinement, noting that it showcased her enduring talent as one of the 20th century's greatest musical stars.

R. S. Murthy of New Straits Times described Andrews' performance as persuasive and highlighted the marvelous accompaniment by the London Musicians Orchestra under Ian Fraser. The review suggested that the album is strictly for lovers of light music.

== Accolades ==
The Music of Richard Rodgers was nominated for Best Traditional Pop Vocal Performance at the 38th Annual Grammy Awards in 1996. The nomination placed Andrews alongside renowned artists such as Rosemary Clooney (Demi-Centennial), Eartha Kitt (Back in Business), and John Raitt (Broadway Legend). The award ultimately went to Frank Sinatra for his album Duets II.

Awards and nominations for The Music of Richard Rodgers
Year	Award	Category	Result	Ref.
1996	38th Grammy Awards	Best Traditional Pop Vocal Album	Nominated	

== Commercial performance ==
Broadway: The Music of Richard Rodgers had a brief but notable run on the charts in Flanders, Belgium. According to Ultratop, it entered the chart at its peak position of 32 during the week of March 16, 1996, showcasing a modest reception in the region. The following week, on March 23, 1996, it slipped slightly to position 34, marking its second and final week on the chart before dropping off entirely.

Even though the album failed to chart in the U.S., RPM magazine reported that the album had "excellent sales" to Phillips Classic label.

== Track listing ==
No.	Title	Writer(s)	Length
1.	"The Sound of Music"	Oscar Hammerstein II	5:07
2.	"I Have Dreamed"	O. Hammerstein II	4:34
3.	"I Wish I Were in Love Again"	Lorenz Hart	3:31
4.	"Where or When"	L. Hart	5:05
5.	"A Waltz Carousel: The Carousel Waltz / Do I Hear a Waltz? / It's A Grand Night For Singing / A Wonderful Guy / Out of My Dreams / Oh What A Beautiful Morning / This Nearly Was Mine"	O. Hammerstein II / Stephen Sondheim / O. Hammerstein II / O. Hammerstein II / O. Hammerstein II / O. Hammerstein II / O. Hammerstein II	14:57
6.	"Nobody Told Me"	Richard Rodgers	4:08
7.	"This Can't Be Love/Thou Swell"	L. Hart	2:30
8.	"My Funny Valentine"	L. Hart	3:32
9.	"It Never Entered My Mind/Spring Is Here"	L. Hart	4:36
10.	"Bewitched, Bothered and Bewildered"	L. Hart	4:45
11.	"If I Loved You"	O. Hammerstein II	3:59
12.	"Edelweiss"	O. Hammerstein II	3:51
13.	"A Cockeyed Optimist"	O. Hammerstein II	4:24

== Personnel ==
Credits adapted from the liner notes of The Music of Richard Rodgers record.

Musical Production

- A&R (Artist & Repertoire Production) – Costa Pilavachi, Hermine Sterringa
- Arranged by, conductor, and album conceived by – Ian Fraser
- Music by – Richard Rodgers
- Orchestrated by – Angela Morley (tracks: 1, 11, 12), Bill Byers* (tracks: 3 to 5g, 9, 13), Eddie Karam (tracks: 2, 6, 10)
- Orchestra – London Musicians Orchestra
- Music preparation copyist – Bill Hughes

Technical and Audio Engineering

- Producer and recording producer – Jay David Saks
- Edited and mixed by – Jay David Saks, Ken Hahn
- Recording engineer at CTS – Dick Lewzey
- Recording engineer at Group IV – Rick Winquest
- Assistant engineer at CTS – Toby Wood
- Assistant engineer at Group IV – Dan Thompson

Visual and Graphic Design

- Art direction – Margery Greenspan
- Design – Isabelle Wong
- Front cover photo – John Swannell
- Photos – Catherine Ashmore

Styling

- Hair – Michaeljohn
- Make-up – Louise Constad

== Charts ==
Weekly charts for The Music of Richard Rodgers
Chart (1994)	Peak position
Belgian Albums (Ultratop Flanders)	32
