= Putting It Together (1993 cast recording) =

Cast recording by Various artists
- Released: 1993
- Genre: Show tune
- Label: RCA Victor

Julie Andrews chronology
The King and I (1992)	Putting It Together (1993)	The Music of Richard Rodgers (1994)

Putting It Together is the cast recording of the 1993 Off-Broadway musical revue of the same name, released by RCA Victor. With a loose narrative set during a cocktail party, the production compiles songs from various Stephen Sondheim musicals, performed by Julie Andrews, Stephen Collins, Michael Rupert, Rachel York, and Christopher Durang.

The songs feature new orchestrations by longtime Sondheim collaborator Jonathan Tunick, adapted for a smaller ensemble and the studio environment of New York’s Hit Factory. Produced by Jay David Saks under Sondheim’s supervision, the album includes more than thirty songs drawn from the composer's catalog.

Released on compact disc (CD) and cassette, the recording marked the return of Julie Andrews to the New York stage after over three decades, and served as the primary way for audiences to experience the short-run production. The included booklet provides full lyrics and liner notes, while the album presents the revue's thematic focus on relationship tensions and emotional introspection through its sequencing and cast's delivery, reflecting both comedic and dramatic tones.

== Production and recording ==
The production featured new orchestrations by Jonathan Tunick, a long-time Sondheim collaborator. The arrangements adapt the original scores to a revue format with a smaller ensemble, tailored to fit the Hit Factory's recording environment rather than a live theatre acoustics.

The album was recorded over several sessions at the Hit Factory in New York and was produced by Jay David Saks, with Stephen Sondheim supervising the recording process. It includes more than thirty songs and musical excerpts from Sondheim's catalog, including pieces from Company (1970), Follies (1971), Sweeney Todd (1979) (1979), Merrily We Roll Along (1980) and Sunday in the Park with George (1984). The numbers were rearranged and in some cases lyrically altered to fit the revue's concept and character dynamics. Julie Andrews, for example, sings "Could I Leave You?"—originally from Follies—imbuing it with the gravitas of her stage persona.

== Album details and release ==
The album features the complete score of the Off-Broadway musical revue of the same name, which was staged by the Manhattan Theatre Club. The show and the album are built around the songs of Stephen Sondheim, taken from various of his musicals and restructured into a loose narrative set during a cocktail party. The revue starred Julie Andrews, Stephen Collins, Michael Rupert, Rachel York, and Christopher Durang. The cast recording preserves the arrangements and performances from this specific production.

Unlike traditional cast recordings that capture songs within the structure of a linear narrative musical, Putting It Together documents a concept revue, which means the album must function both as a standalone listening experience and a representation of a more abstract staging.

This release marked Julie Andrews' return to the New York stage for the first time in over three decades, which contributed to the album’s marketing and public interest. The demand for tickets to the stage show was high, and the recording served as the primary way for most audiences to experience this short-run production. RCA issued the album both on CD and cassette, and it became part of the label's effort in the 1990s to revive interest in musical theatre recordings, after the closing of BMG Studios in New York. A booklet was included with the CD release, offering full lyrics and liner notes.

== Critical reception ==
Professional ratings
Review scores
Source	Rating
AllMusic	3/5 stars
Cast Album Reviews	2/5 stars
Houston Chronicle	Mixed

AllMusic's William Ruhlmann gave attention to the ambitious scope of the recording but noted that it may not fully succeed in reproducing the energy and theatricality of the stage performance. The review emphasized that while Julie Andrews' presence was a significant draw, the effectiveness of the revue's narrative structure did not translate seamlessly into an audio-only format. The album, according to this review, was more a collection of highlights than a cohesive storytelling experience.

Robert Sandla from Cast Album Reviews website described it as "enjoyable" but lacking in vocal balance and production depth. The review praised Andrews for her precise diction and theatrical delivery but critiqued the ensemble's dynamic, suggesting that the performances did not always feel unified. It also mentioned that some of the musical arrangements, while technically strong, did not take full advantage of the cast's potential. The audio mixing, in particular, was called out for flattening the emotional arc of some songs.

Stephen Holden from the Houston Chronicle commented that the album was arguably more effective than the stage revue itself, as the recording allowed the songs to stand on their own without the distraction of the revue's loosely constructed plot. It also emphasized the strength of the Sondheim material, especially when performed by experienced vocalists such as Andrews and Rupert. However, the review also acknowledged that some transitions between songs felt abrupt and that the absence of a strong narrative thread might confuse listeners unfamiliar with the original musicals.

== Track listing ==
Putting It Together – Disc 1
No.	Title	Writer(s)	Performer(s)	Length
1.	"Invocation and Instruction to the Audience"	Stephen Sondheim	Christopher Durang	2:43
2.	"Putting It Together"	S. Sondheim	Stephen Collins, Rachel York, Michael Rupert, Julie Andrews, C. Durang, Scott Frankel	3:33
3.	"Rich and Happy #1"	S. Sondheim	S. Collins, J. Andrews, M. Rupert, C. Durang, R. York	3:38
4.	"Merrily We Roll Along No. 1: Lovely"	S. Sondheim	C. Durang, R. York	2:53
5.	"Everybody Ought to Have a Maid"	S. Sondheim	S. Collins, C. Durang, M. Rupert	3:05
6.	"Sequence: Sooner or Later / I'm Calm / Impossible / Ah, but Underneath"	S. Sondheim	J. Andrews, S. Collins, M. Rupert, R. York, C. Durang	4:23
7.	"Hello, Little Girl"	S. Sondheim	S. Collins, R. York	2:42
8.	"My Husband the Pig: Every Day a Little Death"	S. Sondheim	J. Andrews, R. York	3:43
9.	"Merrily We Roll Along No. 2: Have I Got a Girl for You"	S. Sondheim	C. Durang, S. Collins, M. Rupert	2:05
10.	"Pretty Women"	S. Sondheim	M. Rupert, S. Collins	1:58
11.	"Now"	S. Sondheim	C. Durang, M. Rupert	2:47
12.	"Bang"	S. Sondheim	M. Rupert, R. York	3:20
13.	"Country House"	S. Sondheim	J. Andrews, S. Collins	3:37
14.	"Merrily We Roll Along No. 3: Could I Leave You"	S. Sondheim	C. Durang, J. Andrews	4:26

Putting It Together – Disc 2
No.	Title	Writer(s)	Performer(s)	Length
1.	"Back In Business"	Stephen Sondheim	J. Andrews, S. Collins, C. Durang, M. Rupert, R. York	2:29
2.	"Rich and Happy #2"	S. Sondheim	S. Collins, M. Rupert, R. York, J. Andrews	1:10
3.	"Love Takes Time: Remember: In Praise of Women: Perpetual Anticipation:"	S. Sondheim	C. Durang, M. Rupert, J. Andrews, R. York, S. Collins	5:36
4.	"What Would We Do Without You: Gun Song"	S. Sondheim	Chris / J. Andrews / Michael / Rachel / S. Sondheim	5:00
5.	"A Little Priest"	S. Sondheim	C. Durang, S. Collins, R. York, M. Rupert, J. Andrews	1:39
6.	"The Miller's Son"	S. Sondheim	R. York	4:36
7.	"Live Alone and Like It"	S. Sondheim	M. Rupert	1:36
8.	"Sorry-Grateful"	S. Sondheim	S. Collins	3:47
9.	"Sweet Polly Plunkett"	S. Sondheim	J. Andrews	0:40
10.	"I Could Drive a Person Crazy"	S. Sondheim	C. Durang	2:33
11.	"Marry Me a Little"	S. Sondheim	M. Rupert	3:53
12.	"Getting Married Today"	S. Sondheim	J. Andrews	4:46
13.	"Merrily We Roll Along No. 4: Being Alive"	S. Sondheim	C. Durang, S. Collins, M. Rupert, J. Andrews, R. York	3:05
14.	"Like It Was"	S. Sondheim	J. Andrews	2:42
15.	"Old Friends: Merrily We Roll Along #5"	S. Sondheim	S. Collins, J. Andrews, S. Collins, C. Durang, M. Rupert, R. York	2:32

== Personnel ==
Credits adapted from the liner notes of Putting It Together record.

- Recorded April 19, 28, May 4 and 12 1993, at The Hit Factory Studio 1, New York City.
- Music Directed by Scott Frankel
- Produced by Jay David Saks
- Production Assistant: Regina Elliott
- Production Associate: Karl Hereim
- Editing and Mixing Engineer: Ken Hahn
- Recording Assistant Engineers: Brian Vibberts, Sandy Palmer
- Recording Engineer: James Nichols
