= The King and I (1992 studio cast album) =

Cast recording by Julie Andrews
- Released: October 6, 1992
- Genre: Show tune
- Label: Philips
- Producer: John Mauceri

Julie Andrews chronology
The Sounds of Christmas from Around the World (1990)	The King and I (1992)	Putting It Together (1993)

The King and I is a studio cast recording of the musical by Rodgers and Hammerstein. The album was released by Philips Classics in 1992. Conducted by John Mauceri with the Hollywood Bowl Orchestra, the album stars Julie Andrews as Anna and Ben Kingsley as the King of Siam. The recording uses the orchestrations from the musical's 1956 film adaptation but restores three songs cut from the movie: "Shall I Tell You What I Think of You?", "My Lord and Master", and "I Have Dreamed". Lea Salonga and Peabo Bryson sing Tuptim and Lun Tha, with Marilyn Horne singing "Something Wonderful".

Critics noted Andrews' singing and the orchestral arrangements, while some felt the album was short of charm compared with earlier versions. The album was nominated for a Grammy Award for Best Musical Theater Album and reached number one on the Billboard classical crossover albums chart.

== Album details ==
Conducted by John Mauceri with the Hollywood Bowl Orchestra, the album features Julie Andrews as Anna and Ben Kingsley as the King of Siam. This recording marks the first time Andrews performed the role professionally. The project represented a return to musical theater for Julie Andrews, who had been absent from the genre for many years. For Ben Kingsley, it marked a rare foray into musical performance.

The recording uses the orchestrations from the musical's 1956 film adaptation, restoring three songs cut from the movie: "Shall I Tell You What I Think of You", "My Lord and Master", and "I Have Dreamed". The supporting cast includes Lea Salonga and Peabo Bryson as Tuptim and Lun Tha, with Marilyn Horne singing "Something Wonderful".

Released on CD, cassette, and vinyl (in Europe only), the album incorporates spoken dialogue from the musical to maintain the dramatic structure of the musical. Its creation was part of a larger celebration of Rodgers and Hammerstein's work, timed to coincide with the 80th anniversary of their first collaboration, Oklahoma!.

== Critical reception ==
Professional ratings
Review scores
Source	Rating
AllMusic	4/5 stars
Entertainment Weekly	C

William Ruhlmann from AllMusic rated the album four out of five stars and called it "the exception to the many opera-singers-doing-a-musical recreations", praising Andrews' "brilliant" singing and Kingsley's "contemporary, distanced cool". The review also highlighted Mauceri’s orchestral choices.

Linda Sanders from Entertainment Weekly gave the album a C, criticizing its perceived lack of charm. She said Ben Kingsley fails to match Yul Brynner's iconic King, while Julie Andrews plays Anna more like a stern leader than a warm governess. The star-studded cast, she argued, ultimately weakens the magic of the classic musical.

Theatre writer John Kenrick praised the studio cast recording chiefly due to Julie Andrews' "magical" performance as Anna. He also admired John Mauceri's orchestrations with the Hollywood Bowl Orchestra, particularly their performance of "Shall We Dance", which he felt surpassed the original film version. Kenrick recommended the recording as an indispensable addition to any musical theater collection.

== Awards ==
The cast recording was nominated for the 35th Annual Grammy Awards in the category of Best Musical Show Album.

Awards and nominations for The King and I
Year	Award	Category	Result	Ref.
1993	35th Annual Grammy Awards	Best Musical Show Album	Nominated	

== Commercial performance ==
The album debuted on the US Billboard 200 at #135 on October 24, 1992, and spent four weeks on the chart. On the Billboard Top Classical Crossover Albums chart, it peaked at #1. PolyGram Classics reported initial shipments of 175,000 units. In the UK, the album debuted at #57 on October 10, 1992, and dropped to #72 in its second and final week.

== Track listing ==
No.	Title	Writer(s)	Performer(s)	Length
1.	"Main Title"	Rodgers, Hammerstein II	Hollywood Bowl Orchestra (Conductor – John Mauceri)	1:32
2.	"Harbour"	Rodgers, Hammerstein II	Los Angeles Master Chorale & Hollywood Bowl Orchestra (Conductor – John Mauceri, Music Director – Paul Salamunovich)	0:24
3.	"I Whistle a Happy Tune"	Rodgers, Hammerstein II	Julie Andrews	2:25
4.	"Welcome to Bangkok"	Rodgers, Hammerstein II	Hollywood Bowl Orchestra (Conductor – John Mauceri)	2:31
5.	"My Lord and Master"	Rodgers, Hammerstein II	Lea Salonga	2:07
6.	"March Of The Siamese Children"	Rodgers, Hammerstein II	Hollywood Bowl Orchestra (Conductor – John Mauceri)	3:28
7.	"Anna Unpacks"	Rodgers, Hammerstein II	Hollywood Bowl Orchestra (Conductor – John Mauceri)	2:39
8.	"Hello, Young Lovers"	Rodgers, Hammerstein II	Julie Andrews	3:11
9.	"Home, Sweet Home"	Rodgers, Hammerstein II	Los Angeles Master Chorale, Mevina Liufau & Ben Kingsley (Music Director – Paul Salamunovich)	1:41
10.	"A Puzzlement"	Rodgers, Hammerstein II	Ben Kingsley	3:06
11.	"Getting to Know You"	Rodgers, Hammerstein II	Julie Andrews	4:41
12.	"Garden Scene"	Rodgers, Hammerstein II	Peabo Bryson, Julie Andrews & Lea Salonga	2:43
13.	"We Kiss in a Shadow"	Rodgers, Hammerstein II	Peabo Bryson & Lea Salonga	4:33
14.	"Shall I Tell You What I Think of You?"	Rodgers, Hammerstein II	Julie Andrews	3:47
15.	"Something Wonderful"	Rodgers, Hammerstein II	Marilyn Horne	3:35
16.	"Temple Scene"	Rodgers, Hammerstein II	Ben Kingsley & Julie Andrews	2:47
17.	"Banquet Scene"	Rodgers, Hammerstein II	Roger Moore, Julie Andrews & Ben Kingsley	2:46
18.	"I Have Dreamed"	Rodgers, Hammerstein II	Peabo Bryson & Lea Salonga	3:36
19.	"Song Of The King"	Rodgers, Hammerstein II	Julie Andrews & Ben Kingsley	2:23
20.	"Shall We Dance?"	Rodgers, Hammerstein II	Julie Andrews & Ben Kingsley	4:23
21.	"Finale Ultimo"	Rodgers, Hammerstein II	Edmund Kingsley, Julie Andrews, Ben Kingsley & Mevina Liufau	5:44
Total length:				1:04:02

== Personnel ==
Credits adapted from the album's liner notes.

- Lyrics by Oscar Hammerstein II
- Music by Richard Rodgers
- Orchestra: Hollywood Bowl Orchestra
- A&R by Costa Pilavachi
- Chorus: members of the Los Angeles Master Chorale
- Conducted, and liner notes by, John Mauceri
- Produced by Michael Gore
- Liner notes by Tommy Krasker and Theodore S. Chapin
- Recorded and mixed by Joel Moss
- Cover design by Seiniger Advertising
- Cover photo by Greg Gorman

== Charts ==
Weekly chart performance for The King and I
Chart (1992)	Peak position
UK Albums (Official Charts)	57
US Billboard 200	135
US Top Classical Crossover Albums (Billboard)	1
