= The Raleigh Ringers =

American handbell choir

- Years active: 1990––present)
- Website: rr.org

The Raleigh Ringers is a concert handbell choir based in Raleigh, North Carolina. The Raleigh Ringers perform interpretations of sacred, secular and popular music, including rock 'n' roll tunes, arranged for handbells. The Raleigh Ringers has performed in 39 states and the District of Columbia, in several cities in France and England, and in Canada.

The group plays on the largest set of handbell or handbell-like instruments in the world – 36½ octaves composed of 494 individual pieces of equipment.

== History ==
The Raleigh Ringers was founded by director David M. Harris in 1990. The nonprofit organization consists of auditioned members and is not affiliated with a church or religious institution.

== Awards and nominations ==
In 2014 the group was nominated for a Midsouth Emmy in the "Entertainment" category. This was the first time any handbell group received an Emmy nomination.

== The Raleigh Ringers Series ==
The Raleigh Ringers Series is a collection of advanced handbell music that highlights original compositions and arrangements suitable for performance. There are currently 35 pieces in this series.

== PBS Specials ==
The Raleigh Ringers have two hour-long programs in syndication with American Public Television.

== Recordings ==
The Raleigh Ringers have released 8 CDs and 2 videos.

=== CDs ===
- The Raleigh Ringers
- Impressions of the Season
- More
- Going to Extremes
- A Wintry Mix
- Passages
- Progressions
- Midnight Clear

=== Videos ===
- One Winter Evening at Meymandi (DVD and VHS) - Selections from this were included in the PBS special One Winter Evening at Meymandi.
- A December Tradition (DVD and Blu-Ray) - Selections from this were included in the PBS special Holiday Handbells.

=== Additional works ===
The Raleigh Ringers perform on the Grand Larsen-y CD along with Terry Rhodes, soprano, Ellen Williams, mezzo-soprano, Benton Hess, piano, Steven Reis, cello.
