= Shaun Johnson (singer) =

American musician

Shaun Terrance Johnson
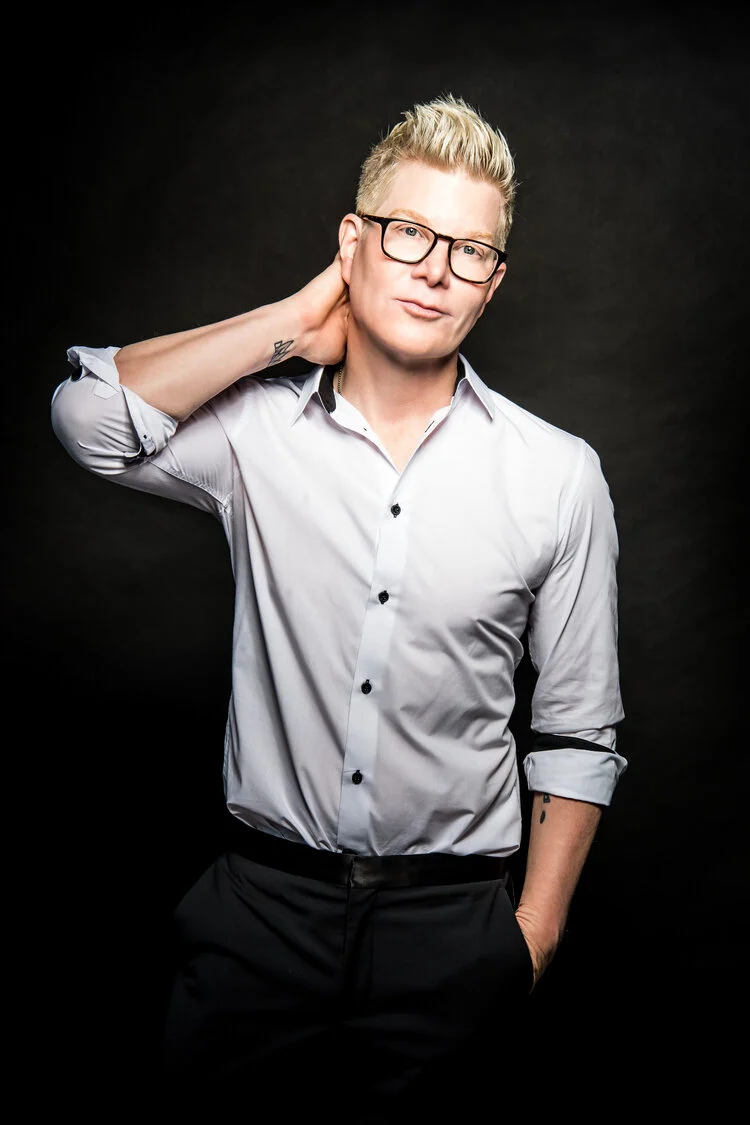

Background information
- Born: Fort Dodge, Iowa
- Genres: A cappella, big band
- Occupation: Singer
- Years active: 1995–present
- Member of: Tonic Sol-fa, Shaun Johnson and the Big Band Experience

Shaun Terrance Johnson is an American vocalist. Johnson is the lead vocalist of the a capella group Tonic Sol-fa, and the lead singer and founder of Shaun Johnson and the Big Band Experience.

== Early life and education ==
Johnson was raised in St. Joseph, Iowa. As a child, Johnson dreamed of becoming a famous singer, and his interest in music was encouraged by his parents.

Johnson, a tenor, graduated from Saint John's University in 1994 with a major in history and political science. While in college, he met fellow student Mark McGowan, and both joined Tonic Sol-fa, an a capella group, in 1995. Johnson chose to join the band rather than attend law school, with law school being a fallback option in case the music career didn't pan out; his family was supportive of the decision. The band's name derived from a method of teaching choral singing used in England in the 1800s. College friends Jared Dove and Greg Bannwarth would later join the group.

== Career ==
=== Tonic Sol-fa ===
According to the St. Cloud Times, Tonic Sol-fa achieved "international fame". Unlike many a capella groups, Tonic Sol-fa's songs are drawn from a variety of contemporary music genres, including pop, rock, country, and bluegrass. The group launched their final tour in April 2025.

The group has sold over two million albums. December 15, 2008 was recognized as "Tonic Sol-fa Day" by R. T. Rybak, the mayor of Minneapolis, In 2010, the band won an Upper Midwest Emmy award for a song featured in a Toys for Tots ad. In 2016, Tonic Sol-fa was voted into the Minnesota Music Hall of Fame.

=== Shaun Johnson and the Big Band Experience ===
In 2012, Johnson created Shaun Johnson and the Big Band Experience. He created the band out of a desire to perform live more frequently. The big band consists of eight members, but occasionally performs with an orchestra. The band performs standards as well as non-traditional numbers; Johnson aimed for the band to be "something other than a staid, 'sing "Sentimental Journey"' kind of show", and to use revenue from the band to fund nonprofits like the Make-A-Wish Foundation.

Band members are recruited from "top-shelf players from across the spectrum of popular music". The band performs a mix of original songs as well as covers with unique arrangements. According to Allmusic, the band "straddles the line between the traditional pop of Frank Sinatra and the contemporary stylings of Michael Buble".

The band initially focused on performing during the Christmas season to raise money for charity. In 2013, Shaun Johnson and the Big Band Experience released the album What I'll Do (YouTube Sessions). The band received a PBS special, The Spirit of the Season, in 2018. In 2019, the band's album Capitol peaked at number five on the Billboard Jazz Albums chart.

== Personal life ==
Johnson resides in Sioux Falls, South Dakota with his wife, Mary, and their three daughters. Johnson previously lived in St. Cloud, Minnesota. According to the Wisconsin Rapids Daily Tribune, Johnson has participated in philanthropic efforts with the Susan G. Komen Breast Cancer Foundation, Habitat for Humanity and the American Red Cross.

== Discography ==
=== With Tonic Sol-fa ===
- Left Turns in Cross Traffic (1996)
- Style (2001)
- Sugaure (2002)
- Red Vinyl (2003)
- By Request (2004)
- Boston to Beijing (2005)
- On Top of the World (2007)
- Christmas (2008)
- Just One of Those Days (2009)
- Something Beautiful (2010)
- Twenty One (2012)
- Original (2015)
- 30K (2016)
- March of the Kings (2019)
- Something for the Rest of Us (2019)
- One Note at a Time (2020)
- Playlist (2020)

=== With Shaun Johnson and the Big Band Experience ===
- Live (2012)
- What I'll Do (2013)
- Capitol (2019)
- The Set List (2019)
- Made for Her (2021)
- Vintage (2025)
