= Tonic Sol-fa (a cappella group) =

American a cappella quartet

- Origin: Iowa
- Genre: a cappella
- Years active: 1994–2022, 2025.
- Website: www.tonicsolfa.com

Tonic Sol-fa was an a cappella quartet from the Minneapolis–Saint Paul region. With a largely pop-music-oriented repertoire, their CDs have sold over 2,000,000 copies, and the group has toured throughout the US and abroad.

== History ==
Tonic Sol-fa began at St. John's University in Central Minnesota and includes lead vocalist Shaun Johnson, tenor and vocal percussionist Greg Bannwarth, and bassist Jared Dove. Together the group reached national prominence with appearances on NBC's Today Show and in Newsweek magazine. Along the way, they have shared the stage with performers including Jay Leno, Jeff Foxworthy and Lonestar, and were part of Garrison Keillor's 30th anniversary celebration of A Prairie Home Companion.

From the group's onset, the members have overseen and operated the business of Tonic Sol-fa, with only a small team of driven supporters acting as managers, lawyers, and publicists, and has increased revenue from a few thousand dollars in their first year to a multi-million dollar limited liability company today. The group has overcome a number of obstacles, including theft within the organization. Still, the group persevered, recording and manufacturing its own records and selling them to a growing legion of fans via the Internet and social networking sites, as well as in the lobby of the theaters where they perform and through a growing national distribution.

Their a cappella blend has resulted in multiple contemporary recording awards, NACA (National Association of Collegiate Activities) Entertainer of the Year nominations, considerable national press, and has landed their music among the best selling seasonal DVD's at Wal-Mart. Tonic Sol-fa has established itself not only as an in-demand vocal group in the Midwest, but also as a successful independent act in America. In addition to substantial CD sales of its own independent releases (2,000,000 copies sold), the group has toured festivals and private shows extensively throughout the US and abroad, leading to numerous sold-out tours of theaters and small arenas.

In 2010, Tonic Sol-fa released their third television holiday special, which aired over 1800 times in forty-seven states and Canada. This special was shown on PBS through 2015.

In 2017, former band member Mark Thomas McGowan was convicted of felony theft for embezzling $27,154 from Tonic Sol-Fa between January 2010 and December 2014.

After their 2022 holiday tour the group went on hiatus. The hiatus ended in 2025 with a farewell tour that lasted April 2025-August 2026

== Final members ==
- Shaun Johnson - tenor (founding member)
- Greg Bannwarth - tenor
- Jared Dove - bass
- Theo Brown - baritone

== Former members ==
- Cheston Lance - tenor (founding member)
- Tim Hoback - bass
- Greg Terhaar - tenor (founding member)
- Steve Smith - bass (founding member)
- Mark McGowan - baritone (founding member)

== Discography ==
=== National releases ===
- Boston to Beijing CD (June 2005)

=== Self-produced releases ===
- Mix Tape CD (2018)
- Original CD (2015)
- LIVE CD (2014)
- The Earth Stood Still CD (2013)
- Twenty One CD (2012)
- March of The Kings CD (2011)
- Greatest Time of Year DVD (2010)
- Greatest Time of Year CD (2010)
- Just One of Those Days CD (2009)
- Christmas Companion CD (2008)
- On Top Of The World (Holiday) CD (2007)
- Christmas DVD (2006)
- By Request CD (2004)
- Red Vinyl CD (2003)
- Sugarue (Holiday) CD (2002)
- Style CD (2001)
- Tonic Sol-Fa five CD (1999)
- Carol (Holiday) CD (1997)
- Left Turns in Cross Traffic CD (1996)
- 4 hours and 12 days CD (1995)
