= Justin Hayward and Friends Sing the Moody Blues Classic Hits =

Studio album by Justin Hayward
- Released: 1994
- Studio: Cream Studios, Germany/Studio M, Germany/CAS Studio, Germany/Smetana Studio, Praha (Prague) and Dolphin Studio
- Genre: Symphonic rock
- Label: Phantom Sound & Music

Justin Hayward chronology
Classic Blue (1989)	Justin Hayward and Friends Sing the Moody Blues Classic Hits (1994)	The View from the Hill (1996)

Professional ratings
Review scores
Source	Rating
Allmusic	1.5/5 stars

Justin Hayward and Friends Sing the Moody Blues Classic Hits is an album by Justin Hayward of the Moody Blues, joined by the Frankfurt Rock Orchestra, with Michael Sadler of Saga and Shaun Williamson as guest singers. It is an album of tracks taken from the Moody Blues' discography, played with orchestral arrangements with lead vocal duties being taken in turn by Hayward, Sadler, and Williamson.

It was originally released with a cover title of Moody Blues – Unplugged – Greatest Hits in 1996 on Phantom Sound & Vision. A 1997 release by ISBA was titled Justin Hayward and Friends Sing the Moody Blues Classic Hits while a 2003 release on Armou was titled Justin Hayward and Friends and the Frankfort Rock Orchestra Perform the Hits of the Moody Blues.

AllMusic described the album as uninteresting and mostly plodding, with Hayward "becoming the Engelbert Humperdinck of 1960s rock crooners".

== Track listing ==
All songs written by Justin Hayward, except "Isn't Life Strange" and "I'm Just a Singer (In a Rock and Roll Band)", written by John Lodge, and "Forever Autumn", written by Jeff Wayne, Gary Osborne and Paul Vigrass.

1. "Nights in White Satin" (vocals: Michael Sadler)
2. "Question" (vocals: Shaun Williamson)
3. "Forever Autumn" (vocals: Justin Hayward)
4. "I Know You're Out There Somewhere" (vocals: Shaun Williamson)
5. "Running Water" (vocals: Justin Hayward)
6. "New Horizons" (vocals: Michael Sadler)
7. "Blue World" (vocals: Justin Hayward)
8. "Isn't Life Strange" (vocals: Shaun Williamson)
9. "The Voice (vocals: Michael Sadler)
10. "Blue Guitar" (vocals: Justin Hayward)
11. "I'm Just a Singer (In a Rock and Roll Band)" (vocals: Shaun Williamson)
12. "Voices in the Sky" (vocals: Justin Hayward)
13. "Your Wildest Dreams" (vocals: Michael Sadler)
14. "In My World" (vocals: Justin Hayward)

== Personnel ==
- Justin Hayward – Vocals (tracks 3, 5, 7, 10, 12, 14)
- Michael Sadler – Vocals (tracks 1, 6, 9, 13)
- Shaun Williamson – Vocals (tracks 2, 4, 8, 11)
- Lutz Halfter – Drums, Percussion
- Thomas Simmerl – Drums, Percussion
- Michael Lakatos – Percussion
- Hans-Dieter Lorenz – Bass
- Johannes Luley – Guitar
- Thomas Lohr – Guitar
- Lutz Sommer – Guitar
- Dietmar Watchler – Pedal Steel Guitar
- Tommy Schmitt-Zijnen – Keyboards
- Frankfurt Rock Orchestra – Orchestra
- Leon Ives – Orchestral arrangements
