= Here Comes the Weekend =

1988 song by the Moody Blues

- Label to Australian single release

Single by The Moody Blues

from the album Sur la Mer
- B-side: "River of Endless Love"
- Released: 1988
- Recorded: 1987–1988
- Genre: Pop
- Length: 4:13
- Label: Polydor
- Songwriter(s): John Lodge
- Producer(s): Tony Visconti

The Moody Blues singles chronology
"I Know You're Out There Somewhere" (1988)	"Here Comes the Weekend" (1988)	"No More Lies" (1988)

"Here Comes the Weekend" is a song written by John Lodge that was first released by the Moody Blues on their 1988 album Sur la Mer. It was also released as a commercial single in Australia and as a promotional single in the U.S. Although it was not released as a commercial single in the U.S., it reached #50 on the Billboard Mainstream Rock chart.

== Music and lyrics ==
"Here Comes the Weekend" is more of a pure rock song than some of the other songs on Sur La Mer. Evelyn Erskine of The Ottawa Citizen noted the raucous rhythm and nearly cacophonus horns" and said "It comes as close to beer hall boogie as a pompous orchestral-rock outfit are likely to get." Music journalist Geoffrey Freakes said that it "moves at an energetic lick driven by frenetic acoustic guitar, a boogie woogie rhythm and...exhilarating keyboard runs."

The theme of the song is similar to that of the Easybeats' "Friday on My Mind" and Elton John's "Saturday Night's Alright for Fighting", with the singer looking forward to the weekend. In this song the singer is lonely during the week but is waiting for Friday so he can be with his love. Portage Daily Register critic Jim Roach said that "The lyric extols the coming of the weekend, but the music makes it sound almost like something to be feared." Richmond Times-Dispatch critic Clarke Bustard described it as a "predictable let's-party lyric grafted oddly onto what sounds like the chase scene from a horror movie sound track."

Freakes called it "a typically nostalgic offering from Lodge that harks back to the singalong U.K. pop songs of the early 1970s, but with a 1980s makeover.

== Reception ==
The song received largely negative to mixed reviews. People magazine said that it "sounds like what two fat, 50-year-old songwriters in the Brill Building would come up with, trying to appeal to the teen market." Daily Press critic Joseph Pryweller criticized the lyrics, sarcastically referring to the "profound refrain" of "Friday night, it's alright, alright." Orlando Sentinel critic Bill Henderson said that the song shows "how sad it is when former trendsetters adopt corporate rock-think." Post-Star critic Mike Curtin said that it "should have the cathartic kick of Elton John's 'Saturday Night's Alright for Fighting'; instead the gloomy chord structure counteracts any feeling of Friday night revelry." Hartford Courant critic Frank Rizzo called it "the group at its worst – as blatantly commercial and manipulative as a cola commercial. Austin American-Statesman critic Michael MacCambridge complained that it sound like "Jethro Tull imitating the Beatles for a Michelob commercial. Pittsburgh Press critic Peter B. King objected to the fact that the "synthesized string parts and choral-style vocals seem to work against the rawness rock thrives on." Los Angeles Times critic Guy Aoki said it has "an otherwise invigorating groove" but "is marred by its weak chorus lyric."

There were some positive reviews. Waterloo Region Record critic Neil Randall called it a "sharp John Lodge rocker." Southtown Star critic John Everson preferred it to Sur La Mer's hit single "I Know You're Out There Somewhere", saying it "[tosses] in some frantic horns and a peppy, percolating bass, to make a great Friday afternoon jam."

The Naples Daily News writer Vic DeRobertis criticized Tony Visconti's production on the song, saying:

Every record producer should be required to listen to this tune to learn what not to do in a studio. The track is so hideously overproduced it hurts your ears. Scads of keyboard tracks wind around a throbbing bass line, interspersed with drums that sound as if they were recorded in an empty garage. There is so much going on that it's impossible to appreciate the song for what it is – a melody with some words.

On the other hand, Roach said that "The production is stupendous with what sounds like about a hundred saxophones backing up the guitars and a maniacal piano."

== Single release ==
"Here Comes the Weekend" was one of the more popular songs from Sur La Mer on album oriented radio stations in the U.S. On August 19, 1988, after the first single from Sur La Mer, "I Know You're Out There Somewhere", but before the second single "No More Lies" was released, Polydor released a promotional single of "Here Comes the Weekend" to radio stations. Unusually for a promotional single, the record did not have a mono version of the song on one side with a stereo version on the other. Instead, it had another song from the album which was also receiving significant airplay, "River of Endless Love", on the b-side. This was possibly because the record company was not sure which song would perform better. "Here Comes the Weekend" would eventually reach #50 on the Billboard Mainstream Rock chart.

The single of "Here Comes the Weekend" on the a-side with "River of Endless Love" on the b-side was released commercially in Australia but was not successful.

== Live performances ==
"Here Comes the Weekend" was in the Moody Blues' live concert setlist during the late 1980s. During those performances, keyboardist Patrick Moraz would play the "saxophone" solo on a keytar.
