= The Other Side of Life (song) =

Single by the Moody Blues

from the album The Other Side of Life
- B-side: "The Spirit"
- Released: August 1986
- Recorded: 1985
- Genre: Synth-pop
- Length: 6:50 (album); 4:49 (single)
- Label: Polydor
- Songwriter: Justin Hayward
- Producer: Tony Visconti

The Moody Blues singles chronology
"Your Wildest Dreams" (1986)	"The Other Side of Life" (1986)	"I Know You're Out There Somewhere" (1988)

Music video
- "The Other Side of Life" on YouTube

"The Other Side of Life" is a 1986 single written by Justin Hayward and first released by the Moody Blues in May 1986 as the title track on the album The Other Side of Life. It was released as a single in August 1986, the second single released from the album, the first being "Your Wildest Dreams". The single became a modest success in the United States, peaking at No. 11 and No. 18 on the adult contemporary and mainstream rock charts respectively. It also reached No. 58 on the Billboard Hot 100 chart.

== Lyrics and music ==
Hayward explained the origin of the song as follows:

it came about because of where [producer Tony Visconti's] studio was, right in the middle of Soho in London and what we would do after we finished recording and [what was happening in] the clubs up and down Water Street. It's a part of London and a part of the world that I hadn't seen since I was 16 or 17 years old when I first came to London. So I wanted to express that in the song and it was a very odd kind of place and an odd sort of atmosphere, where Tony had his little haven of peace and serenity in the middle of this madness in the middle of London. That definitely came through in the song.

Music journalist Geoffrey Freakes said that "with the odd exception (the unnecessarily exaggerated drum fill before the chorus), the synthetic rhythms are more discreet and work for, rather than against, the song," resulting in "an atmospheric, radio-friendly song" with a "fresh, contemporary sound." Freakes described Patrick Moraz' keyboard playing as "superbly tasteful" and Hayward's guitar solo as "scorching". "The Other Side of Life" was included in most of the Moody Blues' live shows after its release.

== Reception ==
Billboard said it is a "bluesy shuffle with a light, lyrical texture." Cash Box praised the music and poetry and "riveting" vocal and said the tune is helped by "bright synthesizers."

In a contemporary review, Indiana-Penn critic Ward Allebach called "The Other Side of Life" "probably the strongest track have put out since their Long Distance Voyager album six years ago." Allebach added that "The driving drum beat into the chorus adds to the ominous mood that anyone could feel." Daily Oklahoman critic Chuck Davis said it is of "epic proportion". Davis described the song's theme as being "inspecting the other side of life," saying that "We never really learn what that means, but, heck, the music is beautiful and Hayward's voice still sounds like a songbird." New Braunfels Herald-Zeitung critic Tom Labinski said that the song "features some great ensemble performances and Hayward's vocals sound better than they have in years." Press and Sun-Bulletin critic Steve Hochman felt that the refrain "Baby, baby, baby let's investigate/The other side of life tonight" sounds "more like a pick-up line than a ticket to ride on the astral plane."

Midder critic Will Fenton rated "The Other Side of Life" as the Moody Blues' 5th greatest song, saying that "With its hauntingly beautiful melody and lyrics, the song speaks to the delicate balance between life and death." AllMusic critic Bruce Eder found it to be "more lugubrious than lyrical".

== Music video ==
A music video was produced for "The Other Side of Life", which received power rotation on MTV.

== Personnel ==
- Justin Hayward – acoustic guitar, electric guitar, vocals
- John Lodge – bass guitar
- Patrick Moraz – keyboards
- Graeme Edge – drums, percussion

== Chart history ==
Chart (1986)	Position
Australian Kent Music Report	80
US Billboard Hot 100	58
US Adult Contemporary (Billboard)	18
US Mainstream Rock (Billboard)	11
