= The Other Side of Life =

Studio album by the Moody Blues
- Released: 21 April 1986
- Recorded: 1985–1986
- Studios: Good Earth, London
- Genre: Synth-pop
- Length: 42:10
- Label: Polydor
- Producer: Tony Visconti

The Moody Blues chronology
Voices in the Sky: The Best of The Moody Blues (1984)	The Other Side of Life (1986)	Prelude (1987)

Singles from The Other Side of Life
- 1. "Your Wildest Dreams" Released: April 1986; 2. "The Other Side of Life" Released: August 1986

Professional ratings
Review scores
Source	Rating
AllMusic	3/5 stars

The Other Side of Life is the twelfth studio album by English progressive rock band the Moody Blues, released in April 1986 by Polydor Records.

This was the first Moody Blues album since 1978's Octave, and only the second since 1969's On the Threshold of a Dream, not to be released by their custom label, Threshold Records. Beginning with this album, and continuing through 1999's Strange Times, albums would be branded "in association with Threshold Records".

== Writing ==
The title track was inspired by the atmosphere in the London neighbourhood surrounding the studio where the band recorded the album. Justin Hayward remembers, "It came about because of where Tony’s studio was, right in the middle of Soho in London and what we would do after we finished recording and [what was happening in] the clubs up and down Water Street. It's a part of London and a part of the world that I hadn’t seen since I was 16 or 17 years old when I first came to London. So I wanted to express that in the song and it was a very odd kind of place and an odd sort of atmosphere, where Tony had his little haven of peace and serenity in the middle of this madness in the middle of London. That definitely came through in the song."

== Production ==
The Other Side of Life was the third recording with Swiss keyboardist Patrick Moraz and the first for flutist and vocalist Ray Thomas not to play a major role. The main songwriters were vocalist/guitarist Justin Hayward and bassist John Lodge, with only one song, "The Spirit", composed by Moraz (his only songwriting credit with the band) and drummer Graeme Edge.

The album was recorded at Good Earth Studios in London and produced by Tony Visconti. Visconti would also produce the group's follow up, Sur la Mer. Bassist John Lodge remembers working with Visconti, and his help using computers to produce the record: "They are interesting albums for me because Tony Visconti, he was a producer, as against Tony Clarke who was a friend and a producer. I became a very good friend of Tony Visconti's, anyway. But it was a time of computers and certainly I think the control of songs went into the control room, instead of being controlled by the artists in the studio. That was a different period of time but he made great records for us. He showed me a lot of things about how to work computers and that stayed with me."

Hayward described the album as "harder and punchier" in comparison to some of their previous releases, saying that "we wanted to create more space in our sound...and make the music more accessible".

== Reception ==
Anthony DeCurtis in his review for Rolling Stone suggested that the album for the most part "plays to the Moodys' longstanding musical strengths: luscious symphonic textures, rich, stately melodies and densely overlaid vocal arrangements" and praised the band for successfully avoiding pompous lyrics, which he felt were present only on "The Spirit".

Midder critic Will Fenton rated three songs from The Other Side of Life – "Your Wildest Dreams", "The Other Side of Life" and "Running Out of Love" – as being among the Moody Blues top seven of all time. On the other hand, Allmusic critic Bruce Eder found the title track to be "more lugubrious than lyrical" and described "Running Out of Love" as "a terrible song with a great chorus."

Daily Oklahoman critic Chuck Davis described "Rock 'n' Roll Over You" as "a rollicking, upbeat, great-sounding rocker." New Braunfels Herald-Zeitung critic Tom Labinski said that the song "is bouncy enough and picks up steam as it goes." Eder said that it "ultimately runs about a minute too long for its own good, and mostly succeeds in recalling older (and better) hard rock numbers by [John Lodge], such as 'Gemini Dream' and 'Steppin' in a Slide Zone.'" "Rock 'n' Roll Over You" was included in the soundtrack for the film The Karate Kid Part II.

== Track listing ==
Side one
No.	Title	Writer(s)	Length
1.	"Your Wildest Dreams"	Justin Hayward	4:52
2.	"Talkin' Talkin'"	Hayward, John Lodge	3:56
3.	"Rock 'n' Roll Over You"	Lodge	4:51
4.	"I Just Don't Care"	Hayward	3:29
5.	"Running Out of Love"	Hayward, Lodge	4:25

Side two
No.	Title	Writer(s)	Length
6.	"The Other Side of Life"	Hayward	6:53
7.	"The Spirit"	Graeme Edge, Patrick Moraz	4:19
8.	"Slings and Arrows"	Hayward, Lodge	4:29
9.	"It May Be a Fire"	Lodge	4:57
Total length:			42:10

== Personnel ==
=== The Moody Blues ===
- Justin Hayward – vocals, guitar
- John Lodge – vocals, bass
- Ray Thomas – tambourine, backing vocals, flute
- Graeme Edge – drums, percussion
- Patrick Moraz – keyboards, synthesizers

=== Technical personnel ===
- Tony Visconti – producer, engineer
- Alwyn Clayden – art direction, design
- Bruce Gill – design
- Michael Hoppen – photography
- Karl Lloyd – illustration

== Charts ==
Chart (1986)	Peak position
Australian Albums (Kent Music Report)	34
Canada Top Albums/CDs (RPM)	46
Dutch Albums (Album Top 100)	65
German Albums (Offizielle Top 100)	56
UK Albums (Official Charts)	24
US Billboard 200	9

== Certifications ==
Region	Certification	Certified units/sales
Canada (Music Canada)	Platinum	100,000^{^}
United States (RIAA)	Platinum	1,000,000^{^}
^{^} Shipments figures based on certification alone.
