= Here Comes the Weekend (disambiguation) =

Here Comes the Weekend is a song by the Moody Blues from the album Sur la Mer (1988).

Here Comes the Weekend may also refer to:

- "Here Comes the Weekend", a song by Dave Edmunds from the album Get It (1977)
- "Here Comes the Weekend", a song by The Jam from the album This Is the Modern World (1977)
- "Here Comes the Weekend", a song by Pink from the album The Truth About Love (2012)
- "Here Comes the Weekend", a song by Roxette from the album Tourism (1992)
