= TonewoodAmp =

Acoustic guitar accessory

- Type: Acoustic guitar accessory
- Inventor: Ofer Webman
- Inception: 2014
- Manufacturer: HONZ Technologies, LLC
- Available: Yes
- Website: www.tonewoodamp.com

Tonewoodamp is an acoustic guitar accessory, a mini amp and digital signal processor (DSP) with effects such as reverb, delay, echo and tremolo. The external portion of the device controls sound taken from the guitar's pickup and is reflected into the body of the guitar itself, the controller is held in place with a magnetic (internal) x-brace. Ofer Webman conceived and designed a working prototype, engineers were brought in to fine tune the product.

The Tonewoodamp is described as "innovative" and "affordable", the device creates sounds that would otherwise require a traditional amplifier with effects. Nathan Bell of Acoustic Guitar magazine reports that the x brace component (magnet component for inside of the guitar) should be augmented with additional tape or adhesive, and that experimenting with optimal positioning of the x brace may lead to better performance. He also notes that the iOS cable for the unit to connect to Apple devices is sold separately. Nick Ryan Piescor of American Songwriter magazine notes that the instructions for installing the Tonewoodamp are extensive and it took some time to calibrate the device to the guitar to find the optimal position for the x brace component. He also reports that the amp would occasionally cut out, this problem was resolved by using the recommended AA batteries.

In the ten years since its 2014 introduction, the Tonewoodamp had been nicknamed "Twamp", vendors like Yahama and Lava have introduced similar technology, requiring the purchase of one of their guitars.

In 2024, the Tonewoodamp 2 was introduced along with an iOS/Android (mixing) app with Bluetooth connectivity. The new Twamp includes the ability to use four effects at the same time and has a rechargeable battery. The external controller has been reduced in size and includes a mechanism that allows it to attach to guitars with curved backs.

== Notable users ==
Andy McKee, Mike Dawes, Becky Langan, Larry Mitchell, Ben Lacy, Guy Buttery, Karla Davis, Cory Batten, Dayna Manning, Steve Katz, Jerry Douglas and George Benson.
