= Live in San Juan Capistrano =

Live album by Justin Hayward
- Released: 1998
- Recorded: April 3–4, 1998
- Genre: Rock
- Length: 79:13
- Label: A Nightswood Production
- Producer: Justin Hayward & Martin Wyatt

Justin Hayward chronology
The View from the Hill (1996)	Live in San Juan Capistrano (1998)	Spirits of the Western Sky (2013)

Live in San Juan Capistrano is a live album by Justin Hayward of The Moody Blues, recorded in San Juan Capistrano, California in April 1998 and released that same year. The live set featured Gordon Marshall, Mickey Féat and Paul Bliss.

The CD is edited, with some songs omitted, though the VHS (1998) / DVD (2002) version of the concert is complete.

== Track listing ==
All songs written by Justin Hayward unless noted.

1. "Your Wildest Dreams" – 4:07
2. "Lost and Found" – 2:59
3. "The Land of Make-Believe" – 2:25
4. "Blue Guitar" – 2:29
5. "Children of Paradise" (Hayward, Mickey Feat) – 3:14
6. "Troubadour" – 4:03
7. "The Way of the World" – 4:55
8. "Forever Autumn" (Wayne, Osborne, Vigrass) – 4:20
9. "The Actor" – 4:59
10. "Watching and Waiting" (Hayward, Ray Thomas) – 4:29
11. "Something to Believe In" (Phil Palmer, Paul Bliss) – 4:10
12. "Broken Dream" – 6:29
13. "The Story in Your Eyes" – 5:25
14. "Billy" – 6:09
15. "It's Not Too Late" – 4:53
16. "Tuesday Afternoon" – 4:24
17. "Nights in White Satin" – 5:23
18. "Raised on Love" – 4:20

== VHS (1998) / DVD (2002) track listing ==
1. "Intro"
2. "Your Wildest Dreams"
3. "It's Up To You"
4. "Lost & Found"
5. "The Land of Make Believe"
6. "Driftwood""Blue Guitar"
7. "Children of Paradise"
8. "Troubadour"
9. "The Way of The World"
10. "Forever Autumn"
11. "The Actor"
12. "The Voice"
13. "Watching and Waiting"
14. "Something to Believe In"
15. "Broken Dream"
16. "The Story In Your Eyes"
17. "Billy"
18. "It's Not Too Late"
19. "Tuesday Afternoon"
20. "Nights in White Satin"
21. "Question"
22. "Raised on Love"
23. "Credits"

== Personnel ==
- Justin Hayward – Guitar, Vocals
- Mickey Feat – Bass, Vocals
- Paul Bliss – Keyboards
- Gordon Marshall – Drums, Percussion, Keyboards, Flute
