= No More Lies (The Moody Blues song) =

Single by The Moody Blues

from the album Sur la Mer
- B-side: "River of Endless Love"
- Released: 10 October 1988 (US); 5 December 1988 (UK)
- Recorded: 1987–1988
- Genre: Pop
- Length: 5:13 (album / single); 3:47 (USA promo single)
- Label: Polydor
- Songwriter(s): Justin Hayward
- Producer(s): Tony Visconti

The Moody Blues singles chronology
"I Know You're Out There Somewhere" (1988)	"No More Lies" (1988)	"Say It With Love" (1991)

Music video
- "No More Lies" on YouTube

"No More Lies" is the second single released from the Moody Blues 1988 album Sur la Mer. As a single, it charted at #15 on the Adult Contemporary chart in 1988. Like the album's previous single, "I Know You're Out There Somewhere," "No More Lies" was written by Justin Hayward.

== Lyrics and music ==
Hayward sings the lead vocals and John Lodge provides counterpoint with his backing vocals. Music journalist Geoffrey Freakes described "No More Lies" as being a "breezy acoustic and electric guitar-driven tune" but said that "although mildly memorable, it's the kind of song you feel [Hayward] could dash off in his sleep." Freakes described the drum and bass parts as sounding "synthetic" but the keyboards as "stirring".

== Reception ==
Richmond Times-Dispatch critic John Wirt said that "No More Lies" "features the warm, sincere vocals of Justin Hayward." Daily Press critic Joseph Pryweller felt that the song is marred by "syrupy, Mrs. Butterworth-type about lovers walking by the ocean." In his review of Sur la Mer, Portage Daily Register critic Jim Roach felt the song was "hit record material", saying that "the smooth texture of full sounding acoustic guitars with impeccably played electrics provide the perfect setting for the romantic unhurried vocal." Sun record reviewers John McCurdy and Ron Judd felt it was an "average song" that the group turned into "pure magic with a stunning vocal performance."

Midder critic Will Fenton rated "No More Lies" as the Moody Blues' 6th greatest song, calling it "uplifting and inspirational" with "a catchy melody and optimistic lyrics". Fenton said that "The song’s themes of hope and faith emphasize the idea that telling the truth can ultimately lead to a better future." Ultimate Classic Rock critic Nick DeRiso described the song as "pillow-soft".

== Music video ==
A music video was created for "No More Lies", directed by Danny Kleinman and produced by Jane Reardon. Although he did not play on the song (or on any song on Sur la Mer), Ray Thomas is seen "playing" tambourine on the music video, and is also shown on the picture sleeve of the single. Billboard described the video as combining "live performance with cell animation and color Xerography."

== Chart positions ==
Year	Chart	Position
1988	Adult Contemporary	15

== Personnel ==
- Justin Hayward: acoustic and electric guitars, vocals
- John Lodge: bass guitar
- Patrick Moraz: keyboards
- Graeme Edge: drums, percussion
