= Mood Six =

British neo-psychedelic band

- Origin: London, England
- Genres: Neo-psychedelia; Mod Revival
- Years active: 1982–2016
- Labels: Cherry Red; EMI
- Members: Phil Ward; Tony Conway; Andy Godfrey; Guy Morley; Paul Shurey; Simon Smith

Mood Six were a neo-psychedelic band formed in London's West End in 1982. Emerging from the remnants of punk bands (Security Risk), mod revival groups like The Merton Parkas and The V.I.P.s, their original lineup included Phil Ward, Tony Conway, Andy Godfrey, Guy Morley, Paul Shurey, and Simon Smith.

Debuting with two tracks—"Just Like a Dream" and "Plastic Flowers"—on the A Splash of Colour compilation, the group found itself caught up in the forefront of the short-lived British new psychedelic revival. Signing to EMI, Mood Six issued their first official single written by Tony Conway, "Hanging Around", but parted from the label when the release of the follow-up, "She's Too Far (Out)", was aborted, leaving only white label versions in circulation. 1980s artist Toni Basil chose to record her own version of "Hanging Around" and this is included as the B-side to her massive selling "Mickey" single. It was also included on her hit album, Word of Mouth.

In 1985, Mood Six resurfaced on the Psycho label with the LP The Difference Is.... After this was well received, especially in Europe, in 1986 they signed to Cherry Red to issue A Matter Of!, which was also released to great acclaim in the US. They guested in the award-winning music video to the Moody Blues' single "Your Wildest Dreams", playing a younger version of the band. After a long period of seeming inactivity, the band returned in 1993, releasing And This Is It on their own Lost Recording Company label.

Two compilations were later released on Cherry Red, Songs from the Lost Boutique and Cutting Edge Retro. In 2016, they had two tracks, "Plastic Flowers" and "Just Like a Dream" on Cherry Red's compilation, Another Splash of Colour. They reformed in the summer of 2016 to play a gig in London.

== Discography ==
- "Just Like a Dream" & "Plastic Flowers" (Two tracks from Various Artists compilation A Splash of Colour WEA K58415, 1981)
- "Hanging Around" / "Mood Music" (7" EMI 5300 1982)
- "She's Too Far" / "Venus" (white label copies only with P/S) (7" EMI 5336 1982)
- "Plastic Flowers" / "It's Your Life" (12", Psycho Records, 1985) (re-recorded version of "Plastic Flowers")
- The Difference Is... (LP, Psycho Records, 1985)
- "What Have You Ever Done?" (12", Cherry Red, 1986)
- "A Matter of.." (LP Cherry Red, 1986)
- "I Saw the Light" (12", Cherry Red, 1987)
- And This Is It (LP Lost Recording company 1993)
- "Plastic Flowers" / "It's Your Live" (12", Old Gold, Spain, 1997)

== Sources ==
- Cherry Red Records: Mood Six
- Answers.com: Mood Six
