= Live in Concert at the Capitol Theatre =

Live in Concert at The Capitol Theatre

Live album by Justin Hayward
- Released: 2016
- Genre: Rock
- Label: Wienerworld
- Producer: Justin Hayward

Justin Hayward chronology
Spirits... Live (2014)	Live in Concert at The Capitol Theatre (2016)

Live in Concert at The Capitol Theatre is a live video album by Justin Hayward of The Moody Blues, released in 2016.

== Track listing ==
All songs written by Justin Hayward (except as noted).

1. "Tuesday Afternoon"
2. "It's Up To You/Lovely To See You"
3. "In Your Blue Eyes"
4. "The Western Sky"
5. "You Can Never Go Home"
6. "Watching And Waiting"
7. "I Dreamed Last Night"
8. "One Day, Someday"
9. "The Eastern Sun"
10. "December Snow"
11. "What You Resist Persists"
12. "Your Wildest Dreams"
13. "Forever Autumn" (Jeff Wayne, Gary Osborne, Paul Vigrass)
14. "Question"
15. "Nights In White Satin"
16. "I Know You're Out There Somewhere"
17. "Blue Guitar (Bonus)"
18. "Who Are You Now (Bonus)"
19. "The Wind of Heaven (video)"

== Personnel ==
- Justin Hayward – guitar, voice
- Mike Dawes – guitar
- Julie Ragins – keyboards, percussions, voice
