= Songwriter (Justin Hayward album) =

Studio album by Justin Hayward
- Released: February 11, 1977
- Recorded: June–December 1976
- Genre: Rock
- Length: 42:28 (album); 48:26 (Original CD); 54:45 (UK reissue CD)
- Label: Deram Records
- Producer: Tony Clarke

Justin Hayward chronology
| Blue Jays (1975) | Songwriter (1977) | Night Flight (1980) |

Professional ratings
Review scores
| Source | Rating |
|---|---|
| AllMusic | 4.5/5 stars |

Songwriter is the debut solo album by Justin Hayward released in February 1977.

It was later rereleased on CD in 1987 with two bonus tracks, "Marie" (originally released as a single in 1979) and "Learning the Game" (a previously unreleased track, written by Buddy Holly). The album was released again on Decca in April 2004 with the additional bonus tracks "Wrong Time, Right Place" and "Heart of Steel" (the B-side of the "Marie" single).

== Original track listing ==
All songs were written by Justin Hayward, except where noted.

=== Side one ===
1. "Tightrope" - 4:49
2. "Songwriter Part 1" - 3:33
3. "Songwriter Part 2" - 2:34
4. "Country Girl" - 4:02
5. "One Lonely Room" - 5:21

=== Side two ===
1. "Lay It on Me" - 2:56
2. "Stage Door" - 5:11
3. "Raised on Love" - 3:13
4. "Doin' Time" - 4:22
5. "Nostradamus" - 6:34

=== 1987 CD bonus tracks ===
11. "Marie" - 3:45
12. "Learning The Game" (Buddy Holly) - 2:12

=== 2004 Expanded edition tracks (UK) ===
11. "Wrong Time, Right Place" - 2:36
12. "Marie" - 3:53
13. "Heart Of Steel" - 3:26
14. "Learning The Game" (Buddy Holly) - 2:12

== Personnel ==
- Justin Hayward - Electric and Acoustic Guitar, Vocals, Drums, Bass, Violin, Cello, Flute, Tambourine
- Jim Cockey - Violin
- Tom Tompkins - Viola
- Tim Tompkins - Cello
- Mel Galley - Bass
- Terry Rowley - Guitar
- Dave Holland - Drums
- Clem Cattini - Drums
- Ken Freeman - Keyboards
- Doremi Hayward - Backing Vocals on "Raised on Love"
- Peter Knight - Strings arranger, conductor

All songs written by Justin Hayward, except track 14 by Buddy Holly

Produced by Tony Clarke, except tracks 11, 12, & 13 produced by Justin Hayward, and tracks 14 produced by Martin Wyatt

Strings on "One Lonely Room" and "Stage Door" by Peter Knight

Engineered By Tony Clarke, Derek Varnals and Dave Baker at Threshold, London
Mixdown engineer: Gary Ladinkski at Westlake, L.A.
Assistant Engineer: Dean Rod

Mastering: Ted Jensen at Sterling Sound

== Charts ==
| Chart (1977) | Peak position |
|---|---|
| UK Albums (OCC) | 28 |
| US Billboard 200 | 37 |
