= Classic Blue =

Studio album by Justin Hayward
- Released: October 4, 1989
- Recorded: 1988–1989
- Studio: Abbey Road Studios, London
- Genre: Symphonic rock
- Length: 58:29
- Label: Trax Music, Castle Music
- Producer: Mike Batt

Justin Hayward chronology
Moving Mountains (1985)	Classic Blue (1989)	Justin Hayward and Friends Sing the Moody Blues Classic Hits (1994)

Alternative cover
- Reissue cover.

Professional ratings
Review scores
Source	Rating
Allmusic	3/5 stars

Classic Blue is the fourth solo studio album by The Moody Blues member Justin Hayward. Classic Blue was released in 1989 by Trax Music (later re-released on Castle Music Records in 1994), and features Mike Batt, who also produced the album, and the London Philharmonic Orchestra. The album includes cover versions of many hit songs, such as The Beatles' "Blackbird", and Led Zeppelin's "Stairway to Heaven." It also includes a re-recorded version of "Forever Autumn," a song from Jeff Wayne's Musical Version of The War of the Worlds, in which Hayward originally sang lead vocals.

== Track listing ==
Original - Released 4 October 1989
No.	Title	Length
1.	"The Tracks of My Tears" (Smokey Robinson, Marv Tarplin, Warren "Pete" Moore)	3:20
2.	"McArthur Park" (Jimmy Webb)	7:12
3.	"Blackbird" (John Lennon, Paul McCartney)	2:28
4.	"Vincent" (Don McLean)	4:49
5.	" God Only Knows" (Brian Wilson, Tony Asher)	3:30
6.	"Bright Eyes" (Mike Batt)	3:50
7.	" A Whiter Shade of Pale" (Keith Reid, Gary Brooker)	4:24
8.	"Scarborough Fair" (Traditional; arranged by Paul Simon, Art Garfunkel)	4:15
9.	"Railway Hotel" (Mike Batt)	3:19
10.	"Man of the World" (Peter Green)	3:25
11.	" Forever Autumn" (Paul Vigrass, Gary Osborne, Jeff Wayne)	5:12
12.	"As Long As the Moon Can Shine" (Mike Batt)	4:17
13.	" Stairway to Heaven" (Jimmy Page, Robert Plant)	7:42
Total length:		57:49

Reissue - Released 1 January 1996
No.	Title	Length
1.	"The Tracks Or My Tears" (Smokey Robinson, Marv Tarplin, Warren "Pete" Moore)	3:23
2.	"MacArthur Park" (Jimmy Webb)	7:16
3.	"Blackbird" (John Lennon, Paul McCartney)	2:31
4.	"Vincent" (Don McLean)	4:53
5.	" God Only Knows" (Brian Wilson, Tony Asher)	3:34
6.	"Bright Eyes" (Mike Batt)	3:53
7.	" A Whiter Shade Of Pale" (Keith Reid, Gary Brooker)	4:28
8.	"Scarborough Fair" (Traditional; arranged by Paul Simon, Art Garfunkel)	4:18
9.	"Rail Way Hotel" (Mike Batt)	3:23
10.	"Man Of the World" (Peter Green)	3:29
11.	" Forever Autumn" (Paul Vigrass, Gary Osborne, Jeff Wayne)	5:15
12.	"As Long As The Moon Can Shine" (Mike Batt)	4:20
13.	" Stairway To Heaven" (Jimmy Page, Robert Plant)	7:42
Total length:		58:29

== Charts ==
Chart (1989–90)	Peak position
Australian Albums (ARIA Charts)	97
Dutch Albums (Album Top 100)	74
UK Albums (OCC)	47
