= Spirits of the Western Sky =

Studio album by Justin Hayward
- Released: 26 February 2013
- Recorded: 2012; Genoa, Italy; Nashville, USA
- Label: Eagle Records
- Producer: Justin Hayward; Albert Parodi

Justin Hayward chronology
Live in San Juan Capistrano (1998)	Spirits of the Western Sky (2013)	Spirits... Live (2014)

Spirits of the Western Sky is a solo album by Justin Hayward of The Moody Blues. It was Hayward's first solo album since his 1996 album The View from the Hill.

Professional ratings
Review scores
Source	Rating
Allmusic	3/5 stars
Classic Rock Revisited	B
Express	4/5
Record Collector	3/5 stars
Sea of Tranquility	4/5 stars

== Background ==
The album was recorded in Genoa in Italy and in Nashville. On it, Hayward explores new areas – country and bluegrass on tracks like "What You Resist Persists", "Broken Dream" from The View from the Hill and "It’s Cold Outside of Your Heart" from The Moody Blues' 1983 album The Present.

Orchestration on the album is by Anne Dudley, an English composer and pop musician who has worked in both classical and pop genres. She is particularly known as a core member of the synthpop band Art of Noise, and as a film composer.

Hayward co-wrote the song "On the Road to Love" with Kenny Loggins. The two artists were both on the road at that time and they were staying at the same hotel. Loggins also plays and sings on the track.

The bluegrass cover track of "It's Cold Outside of Your Heart" was originally recorded for and released on the 2011 bluegrass tribute album Moody Bluegrass TWO...Much Love.

== Track listing ==
All songs written by Justin Hayward unless otherwise noted.

1. "In Your Blue Eyes" - 4:09
2. "One Day, Someday" - 4:24
3. "The Western Sky" - 6:54
4. "The Eastern Sun" - 4:13
5. "On The Road to Love" (Hayward, Kenny Loggins) - 3:35
6. "Lazy Afternoon" - 3:55
7. "In the Beginning" - 3:38
8. "It’s Cold Outside of Your Heart" - 4:01
9. "What You Resist Persists" - 4:32
10. "Broken Dream" - 5:55
11. "Captivated By You" - 3:51
12. "One Day, Someday" (Alternative Extended Version) - 6:15
13. "Rising" - 0:22
14. "Out There Somewhere" - 2:47
15. "Out There Somewhere" (Raul Rincon Remix) - 8:06

== Personnel ==
- Justin Hayward - guitar, keyboards, vocals
- Frederic Arturi - keyboards
- Lele Melotti - drums
- Alberto Parodi - programming
- Tracey Ackerman - background vocals
- Kenny Loggins - guitar, vocals on "On The Road To Love"

== Charts ==
Chart (2013)	Peak position
Dutch Albums (Album Top 100)	95
UK Albums (OCC)	81
UK Independent Albums (OCC)	16
US Billboard 200	142
US Independent Albums (Billboard)	25
US Top Rock Albums (Billboard)	36
