= I Know You're Out There Somewhere =

Single by The Moody Blues

from the album Sur la Mer
- B-side: "Miracle"
- Released: 23 May 1988
- Recorded: 1987–1988
- Genre: Pop rock, synth-pop
- Length: 6:37 (Album version); 4:18 (Single version/Video)
- Label: Polydor
- Songwriter: Justin Hayward
- Producer: Tony Visconti

The Moody Blues singles chronology
| "The Other Side of Life" (1986) | "I Know You're Out There Somewhere" (1988) | "No More Lies" (1988) |

Music video
- "I Know You're Out There Somewhere" on YouTube

"I Know You're Out There Somewhere" is a 1988 single by the English rock band The Moody Blues. It was written by guitarist Justin Hayward, and it is the sequel to the Moody Blues' 1986 single "Your Wildest Dreams", also written by Hayward.

"I Know You're Out There Somewhere" was released on May 23, 1988 by Polydor Records. The B-side on all formats was "Miracle", with the CD single also including a live recording of "Rock & Roll Over You". It is the band's final Top 40 single and their last to chart in the United States, where it peaked at No. 30 on the Billboard Hot 100.

== Background ==
Following its release as a single in May 1988, it was included as the opening track of the 1988 album Sur la Mer. The single has a label time of 4:15, excising the third of the four verses and the instrumental bridge in the middle of the song, while the LP has a label time of 6:38.

According to Classic Rock History critic Brian Kachejian "The song was based on the story of a rock star longing for a past teenage love." The Moody Blues described the song as a sequel of sorts to their earlier single "Your Wildest Dreams," with the singer looking for his lost love, although according to Kachejian many fans considered it to have a deeper spiritual theme.

Hayward stated that the decision to release "I Know You're Out There Somewhere" was inspired by the success of "Your Wildest Dreams", saying:

The success of ‘Your Wildest Dreams,’ which really, I thought it was almost a throwaway song. [Producer] Tony Visconti was a big part of that [success with] his sound and his style. It was only when it came out that I realized that emotionally, it was a common experience for a lot of people. It occurred to me that I had other things at home that had that exact same feel and continued that sentiment. So I dove back into my home tapes and then I realized that "I Know You’re Out There Somewhere" was there too.

Hayward acknowledged trying to make the song sound similar to "Your Wildest Dreams", saying:

I did the keyboard and the guitar and the LinnDrum for "Wildest Dreams," which was finished first and for "I Know You're Out There Somewhere" I decided to use the same keyboard sound and bass sound that I'd got on a Yamaha DX7 and continue that theme. It's the identical tempo and everything.

In the song, the singer remembers an old girlfriend and recognizes that circumstances have changed. Hayward said "I think it just was one of those things where everyone wants to know what happened to the first person they ever really loved. Best not to find out. Best to leave it as a nice memory."

== Reception ==
Cashbox characterised "I Know You're Out There Somewhere" as "vintage-style music" and said that it was a "very fluid tune". Music Week felt that "I Know Your Out There Somewhere" was "well-crafted" and unmatched by the other tracks on its parent album, Sur Le Mer. Music & Mediadescribed the song as "an easy-going and highly melodic song with a pleasant atmosphere and a strong, insistent chorus."

Michael Ofjord of AllMusic described the song as superior to "Your Wildest Dreams" "in all aspects" both lyrically and musically. Kachejian of Classic Rock History rated "I Know You're Out There Somewhere" as the Moody Blues' 9th greatest song, saying that it "presented a more beautiful melodic line, and did indeed seem more sensitive and appealing than the 'Your Wildest Dreams' recording." Louder critic Malcolm Dome rated it as the Moody Blues' 2nd greatest song, saying that it's "catchy yet also calmly intricate." Midder critic Will Fenton rated it as the Moody Blues' 2nd greatest song, calling it "a classic example of Moody Blues’ style, combining lush instrumentation, emotive vocals, and sophisticated lyrics" and also commenting on how its "music builds to a stunning crescendo."

== Music video ==
The video was directed by Brian Grant and produced by Kate Thorn. It features Janet Spencer-Turner as the character from the singer's past; she also played the same role in the video for 'Your Wildest Dreams'. Actor Ben Daniels portrays the younger version of Justin Hayward.

Commenting on the video, Hayward said that it "expresses the song nostalgically. It's a searching, seeking for enlightenment type of song and the best way to portray that was to make it about us as kids. Some of it is very close to a home movie feel."

== Personnel ==
- Justin Hayward – acoustic guitar, electric guitar, vocals
- John Lodge – bass guitar, vocals
- Patrick Moraz – keyboards
- Graeme Edge – drums, percussion

== Charts ==
| Chart (1988) | Peak position |
|---|---|
| Australia (ARIA) | 37 |
| Canada (RPM) | 15 |
| Canada (RPM AC) | 17 |
| UK Singles Chart | 52 |
| US Billboard Hot 100 | 30 |
| US Adult Contemporary (Billboard) | 9 |
| US Mainstream Rock (Billboard) | 2 |

== Cover versions ==
Justin Hayward has released two cover versions as a solo artist. His 2013 album Spirits of the Western Sky has a dance version titled "Out There Somewhere", plus an extended remix by Raul Rincon. His 2014 live album Spirits Live... includes a cover with the original title.
