= Music for Strippers, Hookers, and the Odd On-Looker =

Studio album by Kristeen Young
- Released: 2009
- Recorded: March–April 2008
- Genre: Glam rock; indie pop; alternative rock
- Length: 47:24
- Label: Self-released
- Producer: Tony Visconti

Kristeen Young chronology
The Orphans (2006)	Music for Strippers, Hookers, and the Odd On-Looker (2009)	The Knife Shift (2014)

Music for Strippers, Hookers, and the Odd On-Looker is a studio album by American rock musician Kristeen Young, released in 2009. It was produced by Tony Visconti, who called her mid-way through listening to her 1999 self-made album.

Songs from the album include "The Depression Contest" which Young performed as part of her 2023 setlist. Music for Strippers includes a guest appearance by Patrick Stump of Fall Out Boy.

== Track listing ==
1. "Son Of Man" – 2:38
2. "The Depression Contest" – 3:35
3. "Stop Thinking" – 3:13
4. "Everybody Wants Me To Cry" – 4:00
5. "You Must Love Me" – 2:57
6. "That's What It Takes, Dear (featuring Patrick Stump)" – 3:59
7. "I Won't Be Home For Christmas" – 2:37
8. "Comfort Is Never A Goal" – 3:54
9. "He's Sickened By My Crude Emotion" – 3:45
10. "Lily Sincere" – 1:07
11. "Keyboard Like A Gun" – 3:04
12. "If You Marry Him" – 2:31
13. "Protestant" – 6:15
14. "Halfway Across The Atlantic Ocean" – 4:07

== Musicians ==
- Kristeen Young: Vocals, keyboard
- "Baby" Jeff White: Drums
- Patrick Stump (guest vocalist on "That's What It Takes, Dear")
