= Moving Mountains (Justin Hayward album) =

- 1989 reissue

Studio album by Justin Hayward
- Released: September 16, 1985; June 1989 (reissue)
- Recorded: 1984−1985
- Genre: Rock
- Length: 46:22
- Label: Towerbell; Anchor (reissue)
- Producer: Martin Wyatt; Tony Visconti; Jeff Wayne

Justin Hayward chronology
Night Flight (1980)	Moving Mountains (1985)	Classic Blue (1989)

Alternative cover
- Original cover.

Professional ratings
Review scores
Source	Rating
Allmusic	3/5 stars

Moving Mountains is a 1985 solo album by Justin Hayward of The Moody Blues, released on Towerbell Records. It was later re-released on CD and cassette in June 1989 with one bonus track, "The Lights Are Low".

== Track listing ==
All tracks composed by Justin Hayward; except where indicated

=== Side One ===
1. "One Again" - 4:36
2. "Take Your Chances" - 3:47
3. "Moving Mountains" - 4:49
4. "Silverbird" (Justin Hayward, Jeff Wayne) - 7:37

=== Side Two ===
1. "Is It Just a Game" - 4:41
2. "Lost and Found" - 4:16
3. "Goodbye" - 3:47
4. "Who Knows" - 3:39
5. "The Best Is Yet to Come" (Clifford T. Ward) - 3:53

=== 1989 CD and Cassette Bonus Tracks ===
10. "The Lights Are Low" - 4:39

== Personnel ==
- P.P. Arnold, Vicki Brown - Backing Vocals
- Colin Fletcher, Pete Wingfield - Keyboards
- Eric Stewart - Keyboards, Engineer on "Goodbye"
- Tony Visconti - Keyboards, Programming, Backing Vocals
- Justin Hayward - Acoustic & Electric Guitars, Keyboards, Vocals
- Jo Partridge - Lead & Rhythm Guitars
- Henry Thomas - Bass
- Dave Mattacks, Charlie Morgan - Drums, Percussion
- Chris White - Saxophone

== Production ==
- Arrangements By Peter Knight & Jeff Wayne
- Produced By Tony Visconti, Jeff Wayne & Martin Wyatt
- Recorded & Engineered By John Kurlander, Steve McLaughlin & Tony Visconti
- Digital Mastering By Justin Hayward, Steve Hoffman & Martin Wyatt

== Charts ==
Chart (1985)	Peak position
UK Albums (OCC)	78
