= Your Wildest Dreams =

Single by the Moody Blues

from the album The Other Side of Life
- B-side: "Talkin' Talkin'"
- Released: 9 April 1986
- Recorded: 1985
- Genre: Synth-pop; pop rock
- Length: 4:52 (album version); 3:51 (single version)
- Label: Polydor
- Songwriter: Justin Hayward
- Producer: Tony Visconti

The Moody Blues singles chronology
"Running Water" (1983)	"Your Wildest Dreams" (1986)	"The Other Side of Life" (1986)

Music video
- "Your Wildest Dreams" on YouTube

"Your Wildest Dreams" is a 1986 single by the progressive rock band the Moody Blues, written by Justin Hayward. The song was first released as a single and later included on the Moody Blues' 1986 album The Other Side of Life.

Written by Hayward as a lookback toward his first love, the song features a synth-pop style that marked a stylistic departure from the band's standard lush pop sound. When released as a single, "Your Wildest Dreams" became the band's second biggest US hit, reaching number nine on the American charts.

== Background ==
Moody Blues singer and guitarist Justin Hayward was inspired to write "Your Wildest Dreams" after reminiscing about his first love. Of the song's lyrics, he stated, "For me, wanting to know about the first girl you ever fell in love with, really fell in love with and broke her heart, you always want to know, I wonder what happened. I wonder where they are. Hop in to that time machine." According to Hayward, the song set off a "personal journey" to delve into his past, which he characterized as "fantastic, amazing, and disturbing."

Hayward has since noted the universal nature of the song's lyrics. He explained, "I thought 'Wildest Dreams' would be a throwaway thing that people wouldn't really take much notice of lyrically. But I found out that it was a common experience and desire by a lot of people. So that was very revealing."

== Lyrics and music ==
The lyrics have the singer wondering if his ex-girlfriend still remembers him. According to music critic Maury Dean, to the singer "she's the vision of all that is holy and precious" but to her he is just "a momentary flashback."

Musically, "Your Wildest Dreams" featured a synth-heavy production that diverged from the band's traditionally lush arrangements. This was, in part, at the recommendation of producer Tony Visconti. Hayward noted,

Most of "Wildest Dreams" - 90% of it - is Tony Visconti, my DX7, and a guitar synth. The piece at the beginning of "Wildest Dreams" that sounds like a sort of Theremin ... that's a guitar synth. All of that is. So it was just another way of exploring musical avenues. Tony Visconti was very much into that and the first person who really turned the band on to programming in a serious way. And he was very, very good at it, so I enjoyed every moment of that.

Dean said of the music that it "opens to a huff-puff bass line wiggling around a bump-thump bass drum. 'Wildest' flirts with a snurfling organ and silky strings. Angelic harps even." Dean regards Buddy Holly as an influence on the song.

The song is in the key of G major, with a tempo of 142 BPM.

== Release ==
"Your Wildest Dreams" was released as the first single from the band's 1986 album The Other Side of Life. The song was a top-10 hit in the United States, peaking at number 9, the band's highest charting US single since the number two hit "Nights in White Satin" in 1972. Hayward attributed this commercial success in part to the support of the record company, commenting, "From our side of the fence … well, you're linked with a record company and they choose to promote certain tracks. They either get on board or they don't. In this case, we delivered the album and I traveled to New York City with it. There was a promotion guy and he jumped up when he saw me and shouted, 'Woooo eeee oooooo! Hey man, we have a hit!' People were behind it from the start."

The song became an Adult Contemporary number-one hit, and charted at number two on the Mainstream Rock chart.

Cash Box said of the song that "a lilting and pretty mid-tempo marks The Moody Blues resurfacing." Billboard said it "sounds more folksy, less spacey, but just as lyrical as [the Moody Blues'] classics." The Honolulu Advertiser critic Wayne Harada described the song as "a rockaballad typifying the sound of old" and saying that "It's almost as if the group never went on sabbatical; the charisma as well as the power remain undiminished."

Classic Rock critic Malcolm Dome rated it as the Moody Blues' 7th greatest song, saying that it "has a smooth pop rock vision that complements a simple, wistful melody with nostalgic lyrics." Midder critic Will Fenton rated it as the Moody Blues' greatest song, saying that it "proved to be a lasting favorite, with its memorable sound and positive message continuing to resonate with listeners."

"Your Wildest Dreams" was followed up by a sequel song, "I Know You're Out There Somewhere", from the 1988 Moody Blues album Sur la Mer. Hayward stated that the decision to release "I Know You're Out There Somewhere" was inspired by the success of "Your Wildest Dreams", saying:

The success of 'Your Wildest Dreams,' which really, I thought it was almost a throwaway song. Tony Visconti was a big part of that [success with] his sound and his style. It was only when it came out that I realized that emotionally, it was a common experience for a lot of people. It occurred to me that I had other things at home that had that exact same feel and continued that sentiment. So I dove back into my home tapes and then I realized that "I Know You're Out There Somewhere" was there too.

"I Know You're Out There Somewhere" was also released as a single.

== Music video ==
A music video for "Your Wildest Dreams" was produced and was directed by Brian Grant. It depicts Hayward and an unnamed woman (portrayed by British actress Janet Spencer-Turner) throughout his career, showing how their relationship drifted apart as the band's success grew. Both are shown moving on while also wondering about each other and what might have been throughout the years, culminating in her attending one of their performances. She tries to meet him backstage but is unsuccessful, as Hayward is ushered away before they can reunite. This storyline would later be continued in the music video for "I Know You're Out There Somewhere", with Janet Spencer-Turner reprising her role.

The video received a Billboard Video of the Year award and saw heavy rotation on MTV. In flashback scenes, the young Moody Blues are represented in the video by the British band Mood Six. The video was recognized as the "best overall video" at the Billboard Video Music Conference held in Los Angeles in November 1986. Grant was awarded the top director honor.

Hayward recalled that, initially, the band was meant to play themselves throughout the whole video, but their age prevented this. He explained, "[Grant] was like, 'It can't be you starring in the video, it's too personal and you're too old.' We still looked all right as 40-year-olds, but Brian was like, 'We need younger people for you all.'"

One subtext, which shows up in the music video especially, is a man who has been caught up in his success, which drags him away, every time he has a chance to do something for himself that isn't for "the band".

== Personnel ==
- Justin Hayward – acoustic guitar, guitar synthesiser, vocals
- John Lodge – bass guitar, vocals
- Patrick Moraz – keyboards
- Graeme Edge – drums, percussion
- Ray Thomas – tambourine, vocals, flute

== Chart positions ==
=== Weekly charts ===
Chart (1986)	Position
Australia (Kent Music Report)	20
Canada RPM	55
Canada RPM AC	5 (3 wks)
US Adult Contemporary (Billboard)	1
US Mainstream Rock Tracks (Billboard)	2
US Billboard Hot 100	9

=== Year-end charts ===
Chart (1986)	Rank
US Adult Contemporary (Billboard)	3
US Billboard Hot 100	91
