= The Knife Shift =

Studio album by Kristeen Young
- Released: May 2014
- Recorded: 2013
- Genre: Indie pop; alternative rock
- Label: TVPI; Self-released
- Producer: Kristeen Young; Tony Visconti

Kristeen Young chronology
| Music for Strippers, Hookers, and the Odd On-Looker (2009) | The Knife Shift (2014) |

Professional ratings
Review scores
| Source | Rating |
|---|---|
| AllMusic | 3.5/5 stars |

The Knife Shift is the seventh studio album by American musician, vocalist, and songwriter Kristeen Young. Notable contributions include Dave Grohl on drums and guitar, as well as Boz Boorer and Lou Rossi on guitar. It is co-produced by Young and longtime collaborator Tony Visconti. Those who pre-ordered the album from Young's website received their copy a month before the official release date of May 2014.

Dave Grohl has praised both the record and Kristeen Young, stating, "I love this record. It's unlike anything I've done before. Piano, drums, bass, and guitar. That's it. It's bare, but very deep. Raw, but melodically complex. I love Kristeen. So much. I've never met anyone like her. Neither have you."

Young promoted the release of the album with a month-long residency at the Bowery Electric in New York City. She also made her television debut on The Late Late Show With Craig Ferguson on July 16, 2014, performing "Pearl of a Girl", with Grohl and Pat Smear of Foo Fighters joining her on drums and guitar.

The live show opening for Morrissey has received critical acclaim.

== Track listing ==
1. "This is War" – 3:35
2. "Pearl of a Girl" – 4:08
3. "The Pictures of Sasha Grey" – 3:30
4. "I'll Show You" – 4:00
5. "Jealous of Loved Children" – 3:15
6. "Rough Up the Groove" – 3:13
7. "The Answer to All Your Problems is in this Little Bottle" – 4:02
8. "Everything is Mine Because I am Poor" – 3:17
9. "Red" – 3:32
10. "Put Down" – 3:41
11. "Then I Screamed" – 3:12

== Musicians ==
- Kristeen Young: Vocals, keyboard
- Dave Grohl: Drums, guitar
- Boz Boorer: Guitar
- Lou Rossi: Guitar
