= Sur la Mer =

Studio album by the Moody Blues
- Released: 13 June 1988
- Recorded: 12 October 1987 – April 1988
- Studios: Good Earth, Soho, London
- Genres: Pop rock, synthpop
- Length: 50:56
- Label: Polydor
- Producer: Tony Visconti

The Moody Blues chronology
Prelude (1987)	Sur la Mer (1988)	Greatest Hits (1989)

Singles from Sur la Mer
- 1. "I Know You're Out There Somewhere" Released: 23 May 1988; 2. "No More Lies" Released: 10 October 1988

Professional ratings
Review scores
Source	Rating
AllMusic	2/5 stars

Sur la Mer is the thirteenth album by the Moody Blues. It was released in 1988. It features the hit single "I Know You're Out There Somewhere", a sequel to their 1986 hit "Your Wildest Dreams". Much of the music on the album would fit in the "synthpop" genre, though it does incorporate more rock and acoustic influences than its predecessor.

One other single was issued from the album in the U.S. "No More Lies" did not chart on the Billboard Hot 100 but did reach number 15 on the Billboard Adult Contemporary chart. "Here Comes the Weekend" was released as a single in Australia only but reached number 50 on the Billboard Mainstream Rock chart in the U.S.

Flautist and vocalist Ray Thomas did not appear on the album, although he remained a member of the band at the time during which it was recorded.

== Writing ==
Guitarist Justin Hayward remembers writing "I Know You're Out There Somewhere" and working on the song with producer Tony Visconti:

The success of "Your Wildest Dreams", which really, I thought it was almost a throwaway song. Tony Visconti was a big part of that [success with] his sound and his style. It was only when it came out that I realized that emotionally, it was a common experience for a lot of people. It occurred to me that I had other things at home that had that exact same feel and continued that sentiment. So I dove back into my home tapes and then I realized that "I Know You're Out There Somewhere" was there too. So I was very conscious of continuing that feeling, because a lot of other people identified with it.

He continues:

A lot of people have had that experience where they want to know what happened to the first person they ever loved. My advice to them is to not find out. My thoughts are that you can never go home; you can never really go back. Even before it came out people were going nuts about that song; it struck a chord with people, emotionally. It turned out to be one of the most popular songs that we do with the Moodies. It is one of the most enjoyable songs for me to play when I am onstage.

== Album cover ==
Nicolas de Staël's 1955 painting Le Fort d'Antibes serves as the album's cover artwork.

== Reception ==
Justin Hayward remembers the album's positive commercial reception and the group's second wave of success in the 1980s fondly. He explains, "It was such a wonderful time in our career. We had a hit record and we were on MTV and all of that stuff. It was the second time around for our career. It was particularly nice because I wasn't quite as stoned as I was the first time. I could really appreciate it. I was forty years old and it was fantastic to have a record in the singles charts again."

== Track listing ==
=== Side one ===
1. "I Know You're Out There Somewhere" (Justin Hayward) – 6:37
2. "Want to Be with You" (Hayward, John Lodge) – 4:48
3. "River of Endless Love" (Hayward, Lodge) – 4:45
4. "No More Lies" (Hayward) – 5:13
5. "Here Comes the Weekend" (Lodge) – 4:13

=== Side Two ===
1. "Vintage Wine" (Hayward) – 3:38
2. "Breaking Point" (Hayward, Lodge) – 4:56
3. "Miracle" (Hayward, Lodge) – 4:56
4. "Love Is on the Run" (Lodge) – 5:00
5. "Deep" (Hayward) – 6:50

== Personnel ==
Musicians

- Justin Hayward – vocals, guitars, keyboards, drum sequencing
- John Lodge – vocals, bass guitar, keyboards, drum sequencing
- Graeme Edge – drums, percussion
- Patrick Moraz – keyboards, synthesizers, arrangements

Production

- Produced by Tony Visconti
- Engineered and mixed by Tony Visconti, Paul Cartledge & Sam Smith

== Charts ==
Chart performance for Sur la Mer
Chart (1988)	Peak position
Australian Albums (ARIA)	35
Canada Top Albums/CDs (RPM)	35
Swiss Albums (Schweizer Hitparade)	26
UK Albums (Official Charts)	21
US Billboard 200	38

== Certifications ==
Certifications for Sur la Mer
Region	Certification	Certified units/sales
Canada (Music Canada)	Gold	50,000^{^}
^{^} Shipments figures based on certification alone.
