= Night Flight (Justin Hayward album) =

Studio album by Justin Hayward
- Released: June 13, 1980
- Recorded: 1979
- Genre: Rock and roll
- Length: 44:18 (album); 52:57 (UK reissue)
- Label: Decca Records
- Producer: Jeff Wayne

Justin Hayward chronology
Songwriter (1977)	Night Flight (1980)	Moving Mountains (1985)

Professional ratings
Review scores
Source	Rating
Allmusic	3/5 stars

Night Flight is a studio album by Moody Blues frontman Justin Hayward, released on Decca Records in 1980. It was reissued on CD in September 1989.

The album came about as a result of Hayward's involvement in Jeff Wayne's musical adaptation of War of the Worlds. Wayne produced and arranged the album, which proved to be one of the lengthiest recording experiences of Hayward's career. The music was mostly pop and dance oriented, and most of the tracks were romantic love songs.

The title track was the last to be recorded for the album.

In April 2004, the album was remastered and released on CD with two extra tracks.

== Track listing ==
=== Side One ===
1. "Night Flight" (Jeff Wayne, Paul Vigrass) - 5:24
2. "Maybe It's Just Love" (Mike Silver) - 4:49
3. "Crazy Lovers" (Justin Hayward) - 5:31
4. "Penumbra Moon" (Billy Nicholls) - 4:12
5. "Nearer to You" (Justin Hayward) - 3:42

=== Side Two ===
1. "A Face in the Crowd" (Justin Hayward) - 4:01
2. "Suitcase" (Justin Hayward) - 3:37
3. "I'm Sorry" (Daryl Hall, John Oates, copyright 1972) - 3:11
4. "It's Not On" (Jeff Wayne, Gary Osborne) - 4:10
5. "Bedtime Stories" (Colin Still) - 5:45

=== 2004 Expanded Edition Tracks (UK) ===
11. "Bedtimes Stories (single version)" (Colin Still) - 4:09
12. "Forever Autumn (Live)" (Wayne, Vigrass, Osborne) - 4:26

== Personnel ==
- Justin Hayward - vocals and guitars; bass and drums on "Suitcase"
- Jeff Wayne - production, arrangements, conducting; piano on "Night Flight"
- Jo Partridge - guitars
- Ken Freeman - keyboards
- Herbie Flowers - bass
- Barry de Souza - drums
- Stuart Elliott - drums
- Roy Jones - percussion
- Tony Carr - percussion
- Doreen Chanter - female vocals on "Bedtime Stories" and "Nearer To You"
- Irene Chanter - female vocals on "Bedtime Stories" and "Nearer To You"
- Dave Holland - drums on "Crazy Lovers"

Brass arrangements by Jeff Wayne and Steve Gray. Engineered by Geoff Young with technical assistance from Graham Meek. Assistant engineers: Paul Taylor, Craig Thompson and Norman Goodman.

== Charts ==
Chart (1980)	Peak position
Norwegian Albums (VG-lista)	32
UK Albums (OCC)	41
US Billboard 200	166
