= The View from the Hill =

Studio album by Justin Hayward
- Released: October 15, 1996
- Recorded: 1995–1996; Mullinetti Studios Recco Italy
- Genre: Rock
- Length: 58:59
- Label: CMC International
- Producer: Phil Palmer

Justin Hayward chronology
Justin Hayward and Friends Sing the Moody Blues Classic Hits (1994)	The View from the Hill (1996)	Live in San Juan Capistrano (1998)

Professional ratings
Review scores
Source	Rating
AllMusic	2.5/5 stars

The View from the Hill is a solo album released in 1996 by Justin Hayward of The Moody Blues.

== Background ==
In a 1996 interview, Hayward discusses making the album and how it was his first time recording an album from start to finish as a single batch of songs. He explains, "My other albums were collections of random bits of recording that I would finally put out once I had an album's worth of material. This is the first time I've ever done this, made an album from start to finish. It means a lot to me, and I know that it's good. At the very least, [The View from the Hill] will make your hi-fi sound good... It's a trippy, dreamy, romantic kind of thing. I came to the Moody Blues as a singer-songwriter, and that's always what I felt I was and am. If I'm writing for the Moodies, then I'm speaking for the rest of the band as well as myself. But when I write for myself, I feel it's much freer. It's probably a lot more from my heart and more revealing, more honest. Being a solo artist is more of a priority than it used to be. But I love doing both and selfishly want to have it both ways."

== Track listing ==
All songs written by Justin Hayward unless noted.

1. "I Heard It" - 5:37
2. "Broken Dream" - 5:52
3. "The Promised Land" (Paul Bliss, Phil Palmer) - 7:26
4. "It's Not Too Late" - 5:02
5. "Something to Believe In" (Paul Bliss, Phil Palmer) - 4:22
6. "The Way of the World" - 5:08
7. "Sometimes Less Is More" (Dennis Lambert, Hayward) - 4:08
8. "Troubadour" - 6:34
9. "Shame" - 4:35
10. "Billy" - 7:00
11. "Children of Paradise" (Hayward, Mickey Féat) - 3:15

== Personnel ==
- Justin Hayward - Guitar, Keyboards, Vocals
- Elio Rivagli - Drums, Percussion
- Mickey Feat - Bass, Vocals
- Paul Bliss - Keyboards, Pre-Production
- Phil Palmer - Guitar, Vocals
- Geoffrey Richardson - Voila, Mandolin, Various Pipes
- Helen Liebmann - Cello
- Tessa Niles - Background Vocals
- Lynda Taylor - Background Vocals
- Billy Nichols - Background Vocals
