= Mike Dawes =

English guitarist (born 1989)

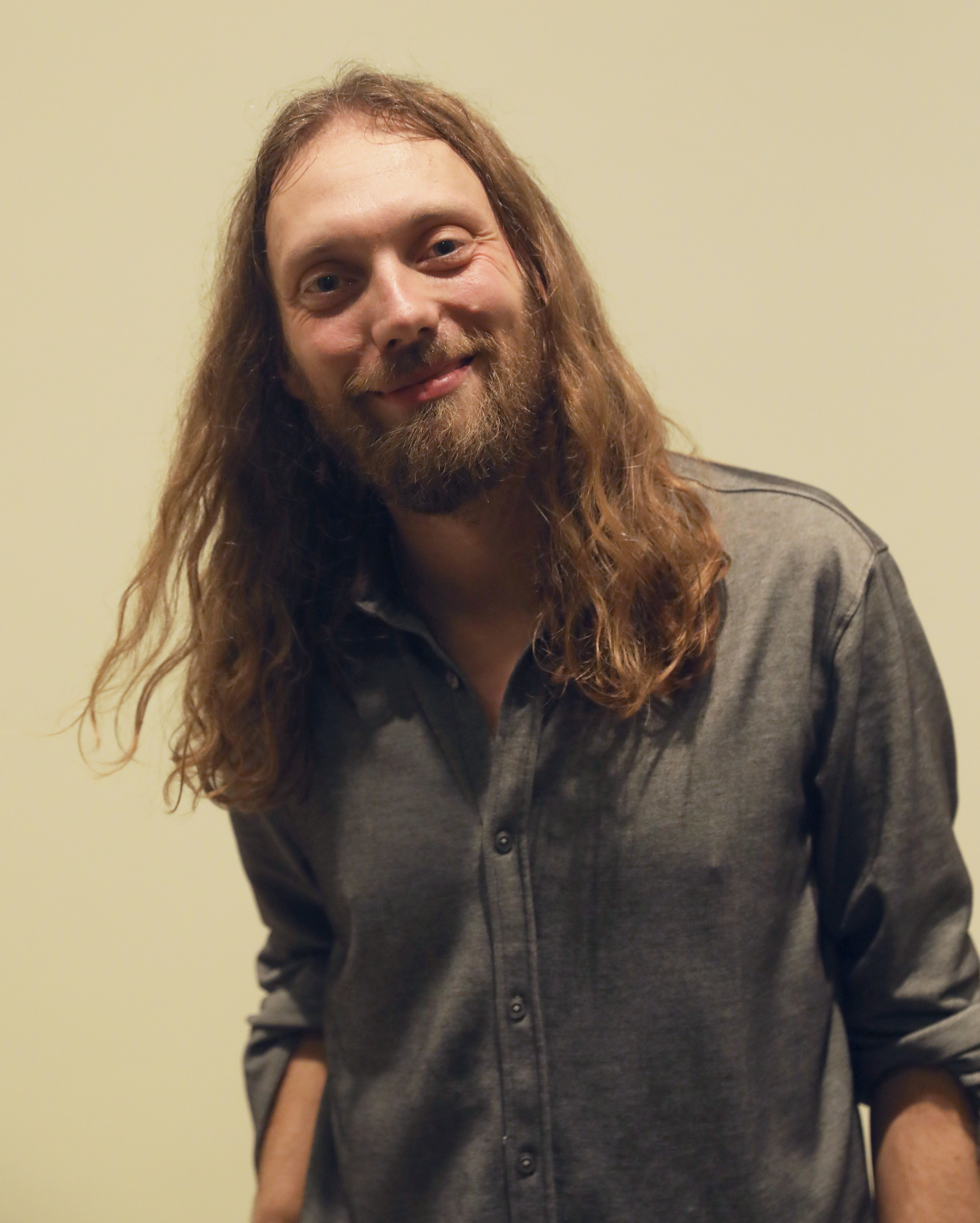
- Dawes in 2024

Background information
- Born: Michael Kenneth James Dawes; 21 July 1989 (age 37); Guildford, Surrey, England
- Origin: England
- Genre: Instrumental rock
- Occupations: Musician; guitar teacher
- Instrument: Guitar
- Years active: 2012–present
- Labels: CandyRat, Qten Records
- Member of: Nik Mystery
- Website: mikedawes.com

Michael Kenneth James Dawes (born 21 July 1989) is an English fingerstyle guitar player known for composing, arranging, and performing multiple parts simultaneously on the guitar. As of 2025, he has released four studio albums, one live record, one EP, and numerous singles.

== Career ==
Dawes experimented with keyboards before picking up his first electric guitar, at age twelve. He switched to steel-string acoustic guitar in 2008.

From late 2008 to late 2011, Dawes performed instrumental concerts at venues and festivals throughout the United Kingdom, both solo and with a concert harp player. During this time, he performed alongside musicians including Seth Lakeman, Tommy Emmanuel, and Newton Faulkner. In 2009, he released an independent EP titled Reflections as well as gaining features on two discs in the Acoustic Guitar Forum franchise.

In 2012, Dawes signed with Wisconsin-based CandyRat Records. He released a technically virtuosic arrangement of "Somebody That I Used to Know" by Gotye on 19 June. MSN News and Reddit featured him on the front page of their websites. Gotye himself publicly praised the arrangement: "It's a really beautiful piece of music. It's wonderfully arranged. It's just a fantastic piece of music. I also like the instrumental interpretation because it gives a different perspective on the musical arrangement. It's not about how somebody's voice transmits the story of the relationship."

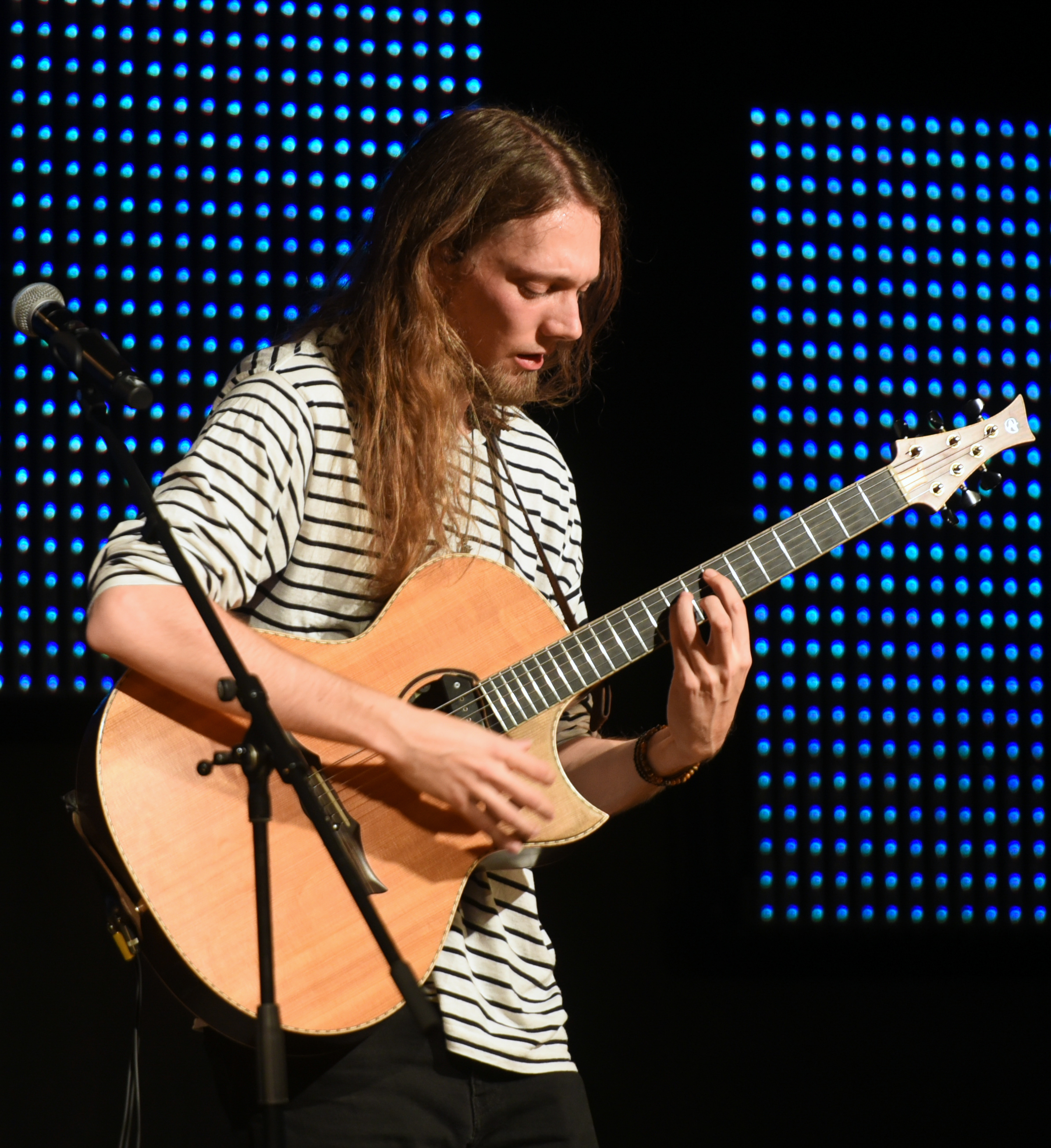
Mike Dawes in 2018

Dawes' next release was another Candyrat single, this time dual-released with an independent collaborative remix featuring Helsinki-based guitarist Petteri Sariola and Adam "Nolly" Getgood from the American band Periphery. Ten per cent of the proceeds of all independent releases went to FAB Projects, a Kenyan charity providing food, aid, and building projects in the region. His What Just Happened? world tour visited over thirty countries on five continents, including performances on the Great Wall of China and the Troubadour in Los Angeles, as well as the first fingerstyle guitar concert in Lebanon's history.

2016 saw Dawes become the first acoustic artist signed by DiMarzio, sharing a roster with the likes of John Petrucci, Steve Vai, and Joe Satriani, as he co-designed the Black Angel magnetic soundhole pickup with Larry Dimarzio and Nick Benjamin. He began a monthly video and print column with Guitar World in the US and taught as a special guest mentor on season 2 of Sky TV's Guitar Star.

ERA, his second album, was released independently on Dawes' own QTEN Records imprint (King Records in Japan, C&L Music in South Korea) in September 2017. The lead single, a one-man cover of Metallica's "One", gained around forty million clicks in its first fortnight online through Metal Hammer, Viral Thread, and Dawes' own YouTube channel. The single also got the attention of the progressive metal community worldwide, a fanbase often present at Dawes' concerts. He was also featured on AMC's Better Call Saul, playing percussion and additional guitar on "Cold Feet", a song created in a session with Fink.

The 2018 Moody Blues Cruise saw Dawes share the stage with Cathy Richardson of Jefferson Starship while opening for the Orchestra featuring members of ELO.

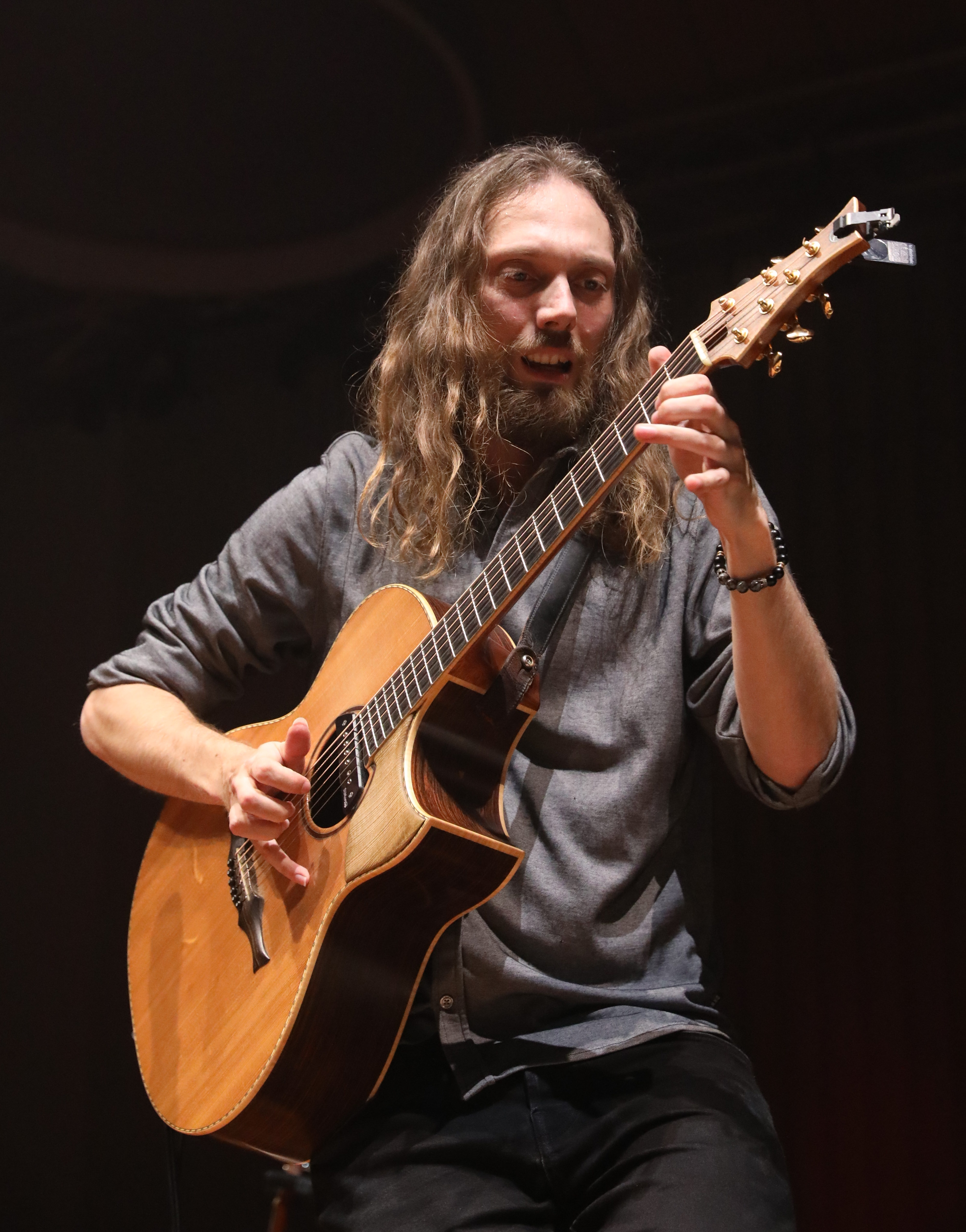
Mike Dawes performing in 2024

In addition to playing as a solo artist, Dawes also plays guitar in the synth-pop group Nik Mystery, together with Spencer Sotelo (Periphery) and Jukka Backlund.

== Influences and gear ==
Dawes is heavily influenced by folk, pop, and rock music as well as other fingerstyle players such as Michael Hedges, Pierre Bensusan, and Eric Roche. In 2017, he performed using Andreas Cuntz and Nick Benjamin guitars. He uses #100 and #138 Benjamin guitars. He also uses D'Addario strings, DiMarzio pickups, G7th capos, and the Tonewoodamp device.

== Tuition ==
Dawes has produced numerous tuition aids for guitarists looking to learn his style of playing. These include four iOS tuition apps for Apple devices, regular workshops, guitar tabs, and magazine columns for Acoustic magazine and Guitar World.

== Awards ==
Late 2017 saw Dawes named as the Best Acoustic Guitarist in the World Right Now by MusicRadar and Total Guitar's end-of-year poll. He won the title again in 2018.

== Discography ==
Mike Dawes discography
- Studio albums: 3
- Extended plays: 1
- Live albums: 1
- Singles: 17
- Collaboration albums: 1
- Other appearances: 5

=== Studio albums ===
==== Solo ====
Title	Album details
What Just Happened?	Released: 9 April 2013; Label: CandyRat; Format: digital download
Era	Released: 15 September 2017; Label: Qten; Format: digital download, streaming
Galactic Acid	Released: 9 August 2024; Format: digital download

==== Collaborations ====
Title	Album details
Accomplice Series, Vol. 3 (Tommy Emmanuel and Mike Dawes)	Released: 23 September 2022; Label: CGP Sounds; Format: Digital download, streaming

==== Live albums ====
Title	Album details
Shows and Distancing: Live in the USA	Released: 23 October 2020; Label: Qten; Format: Digital download, streaming

=== EPs ===
Title	Details
Reflections	Released: 1 January 2009; Label: Self-released; Format: Digital download

=== Singles ===
Title	Year	Album
"Somebody That I Used To Know"	2012	What Just Happened?
"The Impossible"	2012	What Just Happened?
"The Impossible 2.0" (featuring Petteri Sariola and Adam "Nolly" Getgood)	2014	Non-album single
"William Shatner's Pants"	2020	Non-album single
"Somebody That I Used to Know (Live)"	2020	Shows and Distancing: Live in the USA
"Ecomium" (Live)"	2020	Shows and Distancing: Live in the USA
"Slow Dancing in a Burning Room (Live)"	2020	Shows and Distancing: Live in the USA
"Boogie Shred (Live)"	2020	Shows and Distancing: Live in the USA
"The Impossible (Live)"	2020	Shows and Distancing: Live in the USA
"One (Live)" (featuring Quist)	2020	Shows and Distancing: Live in the USA
"Jump"	2020	Non-album single
"Push" (featuring Jake Gardiner and Plini) / "Push (Solo Version)"	2020	Push (Note: Push is the name of a two-song single.)
"Somebody That I Used to Know" (with Tommy Emmanuel)	2021	Accomplice Series, Vol. 3
"Smells Like Teen Spirit" (with Tommy Emmanuel)	2021	Accomplice Series, Vol. 3
"Fields of Gold" (with Tommy Emmanuel)	2021	Accomplice Series, Vol. 3
"Until I Found You" (featuring Guus Dielissen)	2023	Non-album singles
"Hallelujah (featuring Edward Ong)	2023	Non-album singles

=== Other appearances ===
Title	Year	Credited artist(s)	Album
"The Impossible"	2008	Mike Dawes	Acoustic Guitar Forum No. 2
"Clocks"	2010	Mike Dawes	Acoustic Guitar Forum No. 3
"Scotch Pancake"	2010	Mike Dawes	Acoustic Guitar Forum No. 4
Full album	2016	Mike Dawes	Live in Concert at the Capitol Theatre
"Melancholia"	2017	Flux Conduct (featuring Mike Dawes)	Yetzer Hara
"Boogie Slam"	2019	Mike Dawes	Acoustic Guitar Forum No. 5
"It's Only Smiles Acoustic"	2024	Periphery (feat. Mike Dawes)	2 Song Acoustic Single
"Scarlet Acoustic"	2024	Periphery (feat. Mike Dawes)	2 Song Acoustic Single

=== Guest appearances ===
- Live in Clearwater DVD/Blu-ray (Justin Hayward) September 2016: Dawes performs electric and acoustic guitars.
- The Story Behind Nights in White Satin DVD/Blu-ray (Justin Hayward) February 2015: Dawes performs acoustic guitar.
- Spirits Live in Atlanta DVD/Blu-ray (Justin Hayward) August 2014: Dawes performs electric and acoustic guitar; additional clips of original music. "Spirits... Live" entered the US Billboard charts at #2.
