= Lava Music =

Chinese music technology company

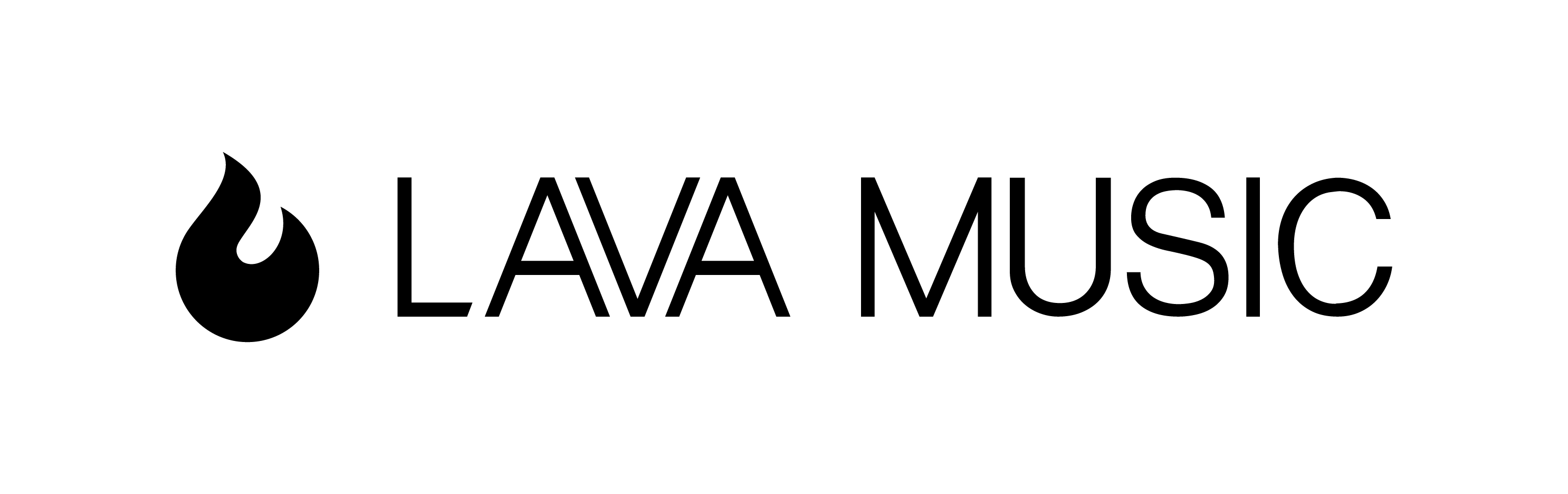
- Trade name: Lava Music
- Company type: Brand
- Industry: Musical Instruments
- Founder: Lu Zitian
- Headquarters: Guangdong, China
- Area served: Worldwide
- Products: Acoustic-electric guitars, ukuleles, and guitar accessories
- Website: lavamusic.com.vn

Lava Music Inc., stylized as LAVA MUSIC, is a music technology company based in Guangdong, China.

== History ==
Lava Music was founded in 2013 by Lu Zitian.

Lava Music introduced their first guitar in 2015 named Lava Guitar.

In 2017, Lava Music developed the first unibody carbon fiber guitar, Lava Me, using the AirSonic carbon fiber material. Later, in the same year, it received an award given by the Industrial Designers Society of America.

In 2018, the company introduced Lava Me 2 which was later reviewed by New Atlas magazine. Later, in 2020, Acoustic Guitar also reviewed the instrument and wrote positively about the molded design, use of carbon fiber material, and usage of advanced electronics.

In 2019, Lava Me Pro and Lava U were introduced. In the same year, Lava Me Pro received an award given by the Industrial Designers Society of America.

Both instruments, Lava Me Pro and Lava U, have been reviewed by Guitar World. Lava U was also reviewed by Ukulele Mag. Guitar World called Lava U the most technologically advanced ukulele. Later, in 2021, both instruments received iF Design Award and Red Dot award.

In 2020, Lava Music collaborated with a fashion brand, Chemist Creations, and introduced a limited edition acoustic-electric guitar.

In December 2021, Lava Music launched a smart guitar named, Lava Me 3. The guitar features a multi-touch display and a HILAVA system that integrates a variety of applications including tuner, tempo, recorder, effects, and loops. It supports Wi-Fi connectivity, Bluetooth and auto-syncs to a mobile app called LAVA+. Guitar Player described it as "a forward-thinking instrument that promises to reinvent the way you make music."

== Products ==
| Model | Released | Colors | Preamp system | Sizes | Body material | Reference | | | | | | |
|---|---|---|---|---|---|---|---|---|---|---|---|---|
| Model | Released | Colors | Preamp system | Sizes | Body material | Reference | LAVA ME | 2017 | Matte Black / Matte White / Polished White | L2 | 36 inch | AirSonic Carbon Fiber |
| LAVA ME 2 | 2018 | Black / White / Blue / Orange / Pink | L2 | 36 inch | AirSonic Carbon Fiber | | | | | | | |
| LAVA ME PRO | 2019 | Black Gold / Space Gray | L2 Pro | 41 inch | AirSonic Carbon Fiber | | | | | | | |
| LAVA U | 2019 | Sparkle Black / Sparkle Red / Sparkle Blue / Sparkle Pink / Sparkle Purple / Sparkle Gold | L2 Mini | 23 inch / 26 inch | AirSonic Carbon Fiber | | | | | | | |
| LAVA ME 3 | 2021 | Space Gray / White / Blue / Red / Soft Gold / Pink | L3 Smart Preamp | 36 inch / 38 inch | AirSonic 2 Carbon Fiber | | | | | | | |
| LAVA ME 4 | 2023 | Space Gray / White / Blue / Red / Soft Gold / Pink | L3 Smart Preamp | 36 inch / 38 inch | AirSonic 3 Carbon Fiber | | | | | | | |
| LAVA Genie | 2024 | Space Gray / Cream White | L2 Pro | 34 inch | AirSonic Carbon Fiber | | | | | | | |

== Gallery ==
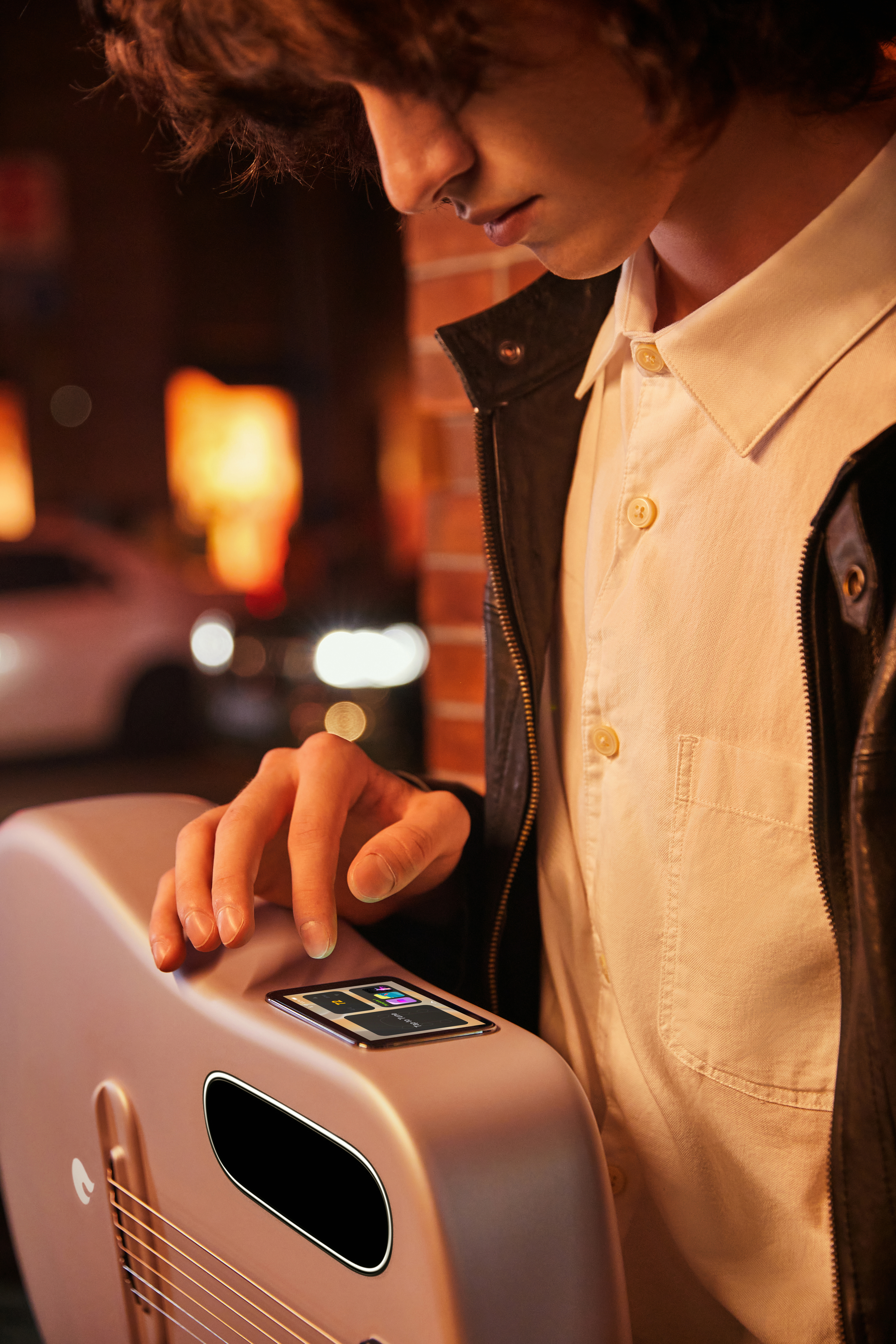

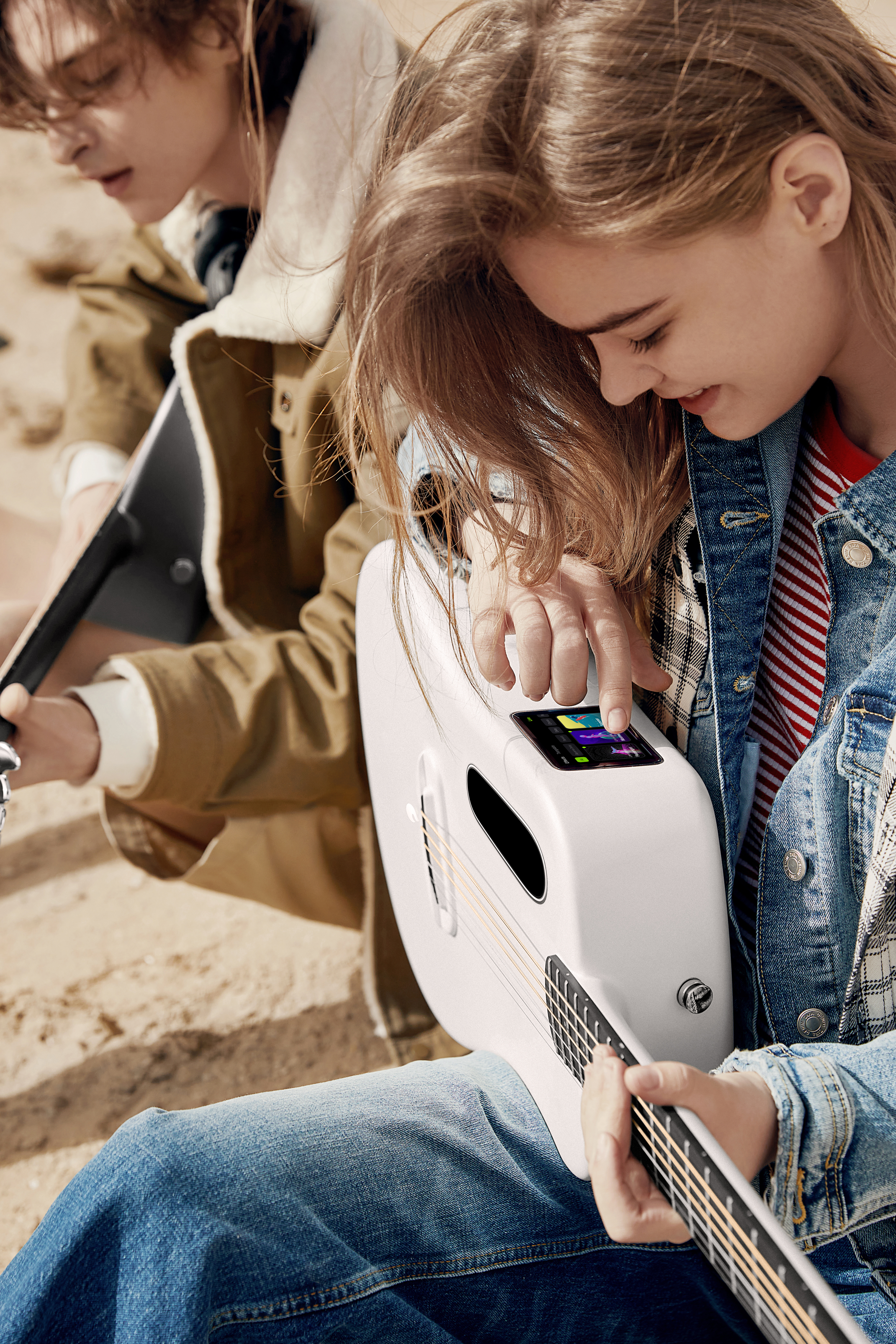

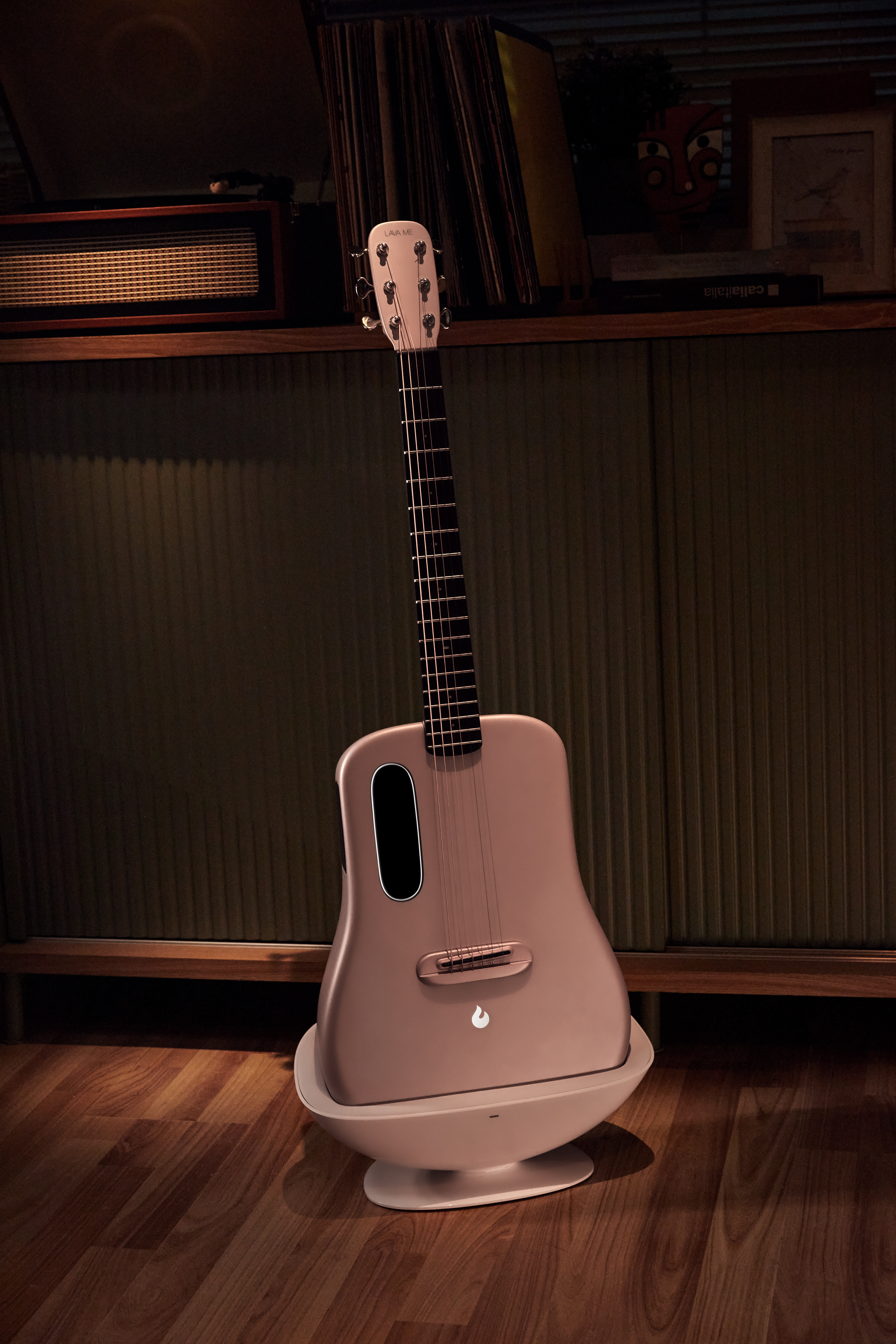

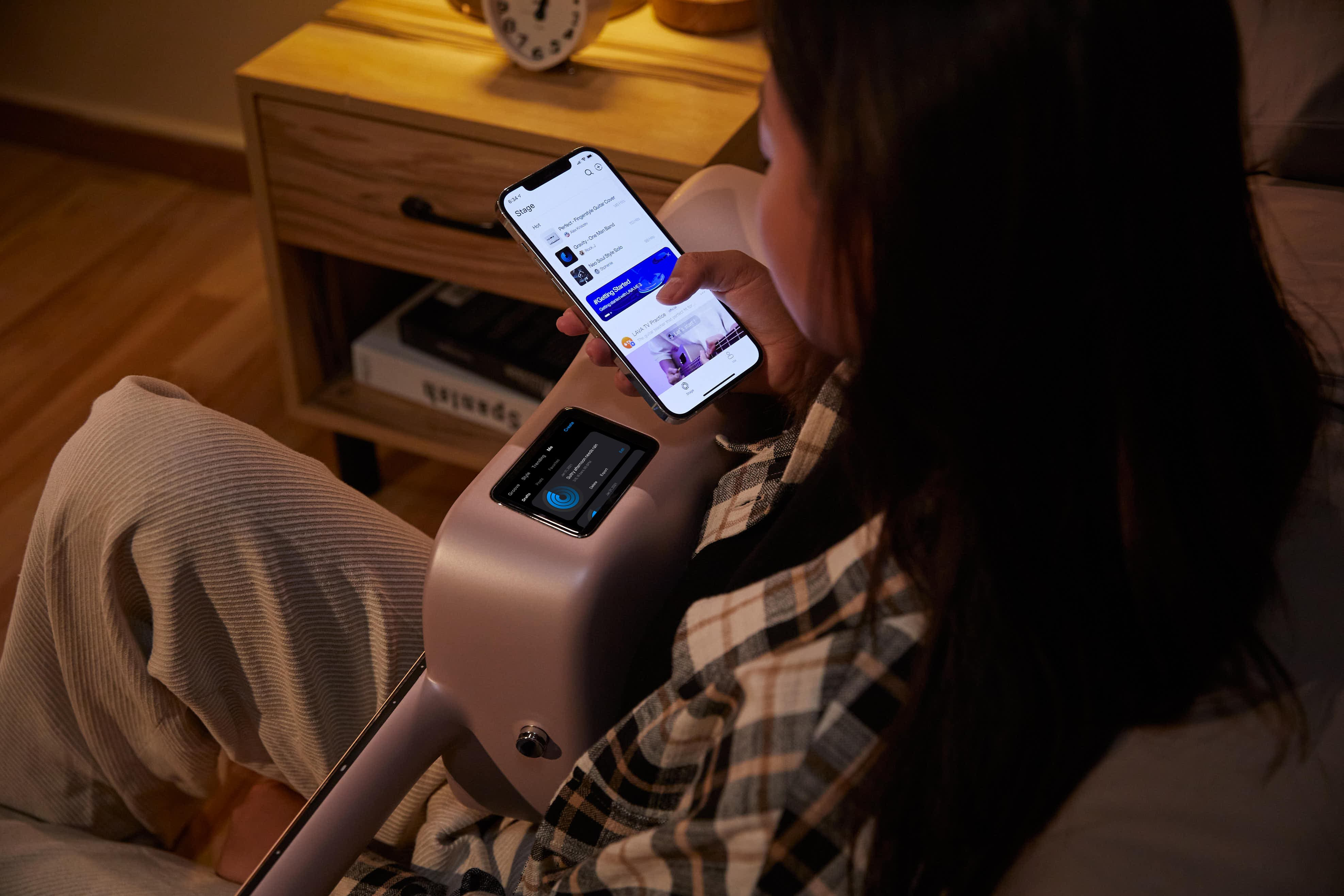
