= Tony Visconti =

American record producer and musician (born 1944)

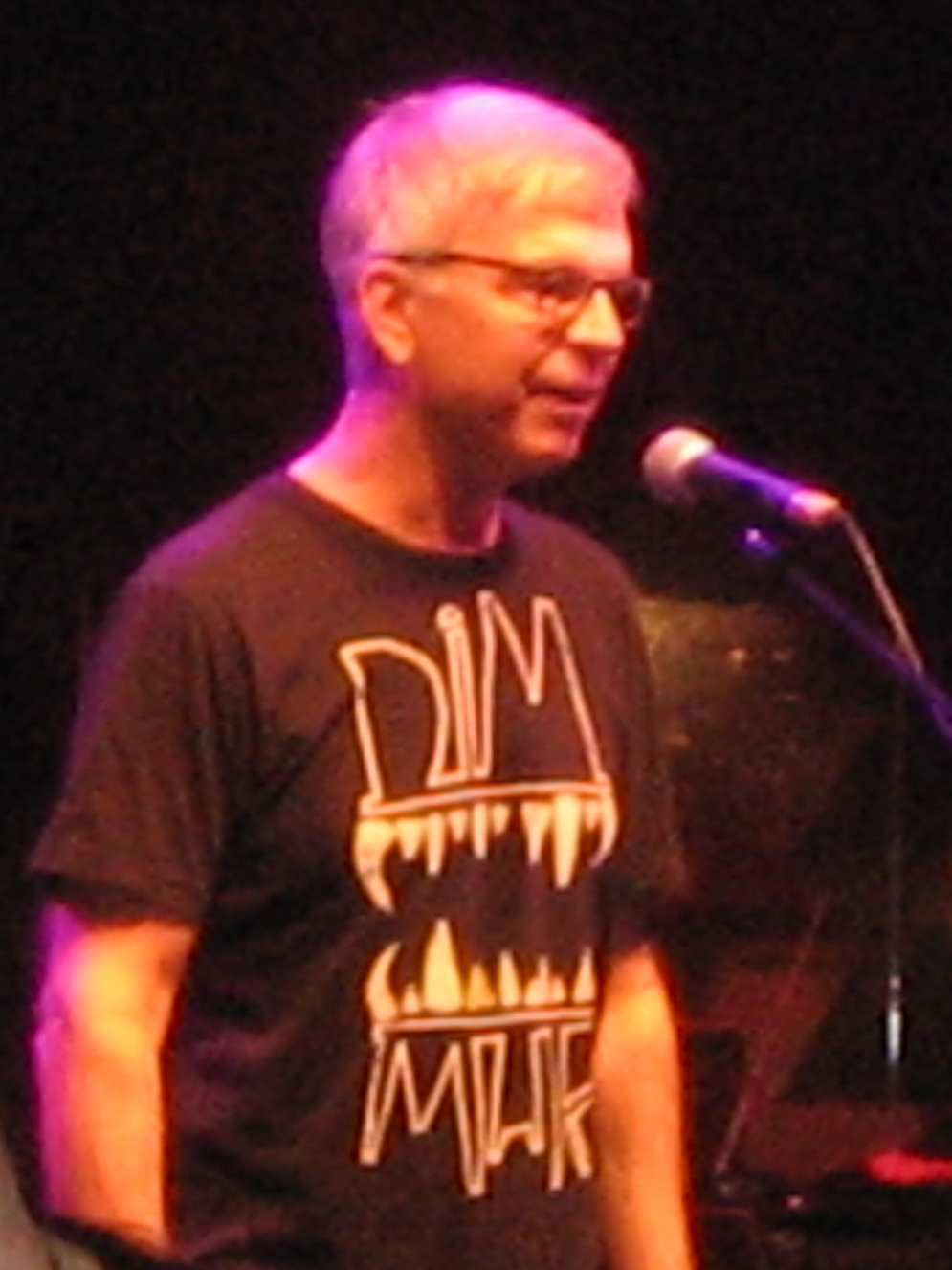
- Visconti in 2007 performing at the T.Rextasy anniversary concert for Marc Bolan

Background information
- Born: Anthony Edward Visconti; April 24, 1944 (age 82); New York City, U.S.
- Genres: Rock; glam rock
- Occupations: Producer; arranger; singer; musician
- Instruments: Vocals; bass guitar; guitar; piano; flute; recorder; mandolin
- Years active: 1967–present
- Member of: Holy Holy
- Formerly of: Hype
- Spouses: Siegrid Berman (divorced); Mary Hopkin (m. 1971; div. 1981); May Pang (m. 1989; div. 2000)
- Partner: Kristeen Young
- Website: tonyvisconti.com

Anthony Edward Visconti (born April 24, 1944) is an American record producer, musician and singer. Since the late 1960s, he has worked with an array of performers, notably David Bowie, and has earned three Grammy Awards.

His first hit single was T. Rex's "Ride a White Swan" in 1970, the first of many hits in collaboration with Marc Bolan. Visconti's lengthiest involvement was with David Bowie: intermittently from 1968 to his final album Blackstar in 2016, Visconti produced and occasionally performed on many of Bowie's albums. Visconti's work on Blackstar was awarded the Grammy Award for Best Engineered Album, Non-Classical and his production of Angelique Kidjo's Djin Djin received the Grammy Award for Best Contemporary World Music Album.

== Early life ==
Visconti was born in Brooklyn, New York City, to parents of Italian descent. He grew up in 363 Warren Street in Boerum Hill, Brooklyn.

He started to play the ukulele when he was five years old and then learned guitar. He attended New Utrecht High School. Throughout his teenage years Visconti was involved with both a classical brass band (playing tuba) and a traditional orchestra (playing double bass), as well as playing rock-and-roll-oriented guitar, valuable experience that served him well in later years. By the age of 15, he had focused his efforts on playing in local Brooklyn bands.

After leaving school he played guitar in a band called Ricardo & the Latineers in the Catskills; the band also included Artie Butler, later a leading arranger. In 1960, he played his first recording session and over the next few years became one of the leading guitarists in New York nightclubs. He played in lounge acts, including the Ned Harvey Band and the Speedy Garfin Band, before joining a touring version of the Crew-Cuts, where he met his future wife. As Tony and Siegrid, the pair released two singles; the first, "Long Hair", was a regional hit in New York in 1966, but they could not maintain its success.

== Production ==
Visconti then became in-house producer for his publisher, the Richmond Organization. Through this position, in 1968, he met British producer Denny Cordell, who asked him to assist in recordings for successful jazz vocalist Georgie Fame, prompting Visconti to move to London.

One of his first production projects in England was with the British outfit Tyrannosaurus Rex (later to become T. Rex) on their debut album My People Were Fair and Had Sky in Their Hair... But Now They're Content to Wear Stars on Their Brows (1968). This began a relationship with T. Rex that would last for their next eight albums and eleven UK Top Ten singles in a row, commencing with "Ride a White Swan" (1970). One of Visconti's greatest successes was Electric Warrior (1971), the album that made T. Rex frontman Marc Bolan a superstar and cemented Visconti's producing prowess.

More early production work included David Bowie's second album (1969) and for the Welsh group The Iveys (later known as Badfinger). He produced several tracks for the Iveys' first LP, Maybe Tomorrow (1969), and Magic Christian Music (1970), released on the Beatles' Apple label.

He produced the first two albums by influential progressive rock band Gentle Giant. Shortly afterwards, Visconti began to work again with Bowie and, along with guitarist Mick Ronson and drummer John Cambridge, formed and toured with the band The Hype, in which he played bass. Although the band name would be very short-lived, most of the line-up persisted and—with Woody Woodmansey replacing Cambridge—would go on to record Bowie's album and single The Man Who Sold the World in 1970. He would further go on to work on Bowie's albums Diamond Dogs (1974), Young Americans (1975), Low (1977), "Heroes" (1977), Lodger (1979), Scary Monsters (And Super Creeps) (1980), Heathen (2002), Reality (2003), The Next Day (2013), and his final album, Blackstar (2016).

In late 1970 and early 1971, Visconti produced both the debut and second albums by UK Afrorock pioneers Osibisa. These were 1971’s self titled debut and its follow up Woyaya. Both albums also featured early examples of the artwork of Roger Dean.

Visconti scored the orchestral arrangements for Paul McCartney and Wings' 1973 album Band on the Run. He later produced two albums for the Moody Blues, The Other Side of Life (1986) and Sur La Mer (1988). Visconti contributed brass arrangements to OMD's Junk Culture (1984).

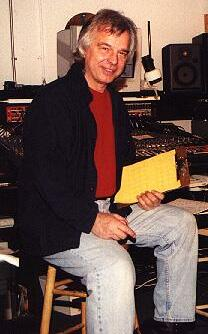
Visconti, c. 2000.

In 1990, he produced several tracks on the Moody Blues' Keys of the Kingdom album (1991), Luscious Jackson's Electric Honey, Leisure Noise by Gay Dad, Soul Caddy for Cherry Poppin' Daddies, and Dawn of Ananda for Annie Haslam. In 1997, Visconti produced the debut album of The Stone Roses member John Squire's new band, The Seahorses, entitled Do It Yourself.

He produced and played bass on a handful of tracks from The Dandy Warhols' 2003 album, Welcome to the Monkey House. In 2003 he teamed up with the Finn Brothers (Neil and Tim of Crowded House and Split Enz) to record and produce their second collaborative album, eventually released in 2004. That same year, he produced three songs on the Manic Street Preachers album Lifeblood. In 2005, he collaborated with Copenhagen band Kashmir, whose fifth album, No Balance Palace, featured David Bowie. He has also collaborated as co-writer and producer on an album project by Richard Barone. He worked in Rome and produced the No. 1 UK album by Morrissey Ringleader of the Tormentors.

His autobiography, Bowie, Bolan and The Brooklyn Boy, co-written with Richard Havers, was published in February 2007 by HarperCollins UK. The book has been translated into French by Jérôme Soligny as Bowie, Bolan et le Gamin de Brooklyn, published by Tournon.

In 2007 and 2008, Visconti was very active in the studio with Beninese singer Angélique Kidjo, producing her Grammy-winning album Djin Djin, which included guest artists Alicia Keys, Peter Gabriel, Joss Stone, Josh Groban, and Carlos Santana. He has also produced and mixed two albums at Saint Claire Recording Studio in Lexington, Kentucky: The Bright Lights of America by Pittsburgh punk band Anti-Flag and Alejandro Escovedo's album Real Animal, released in June 2008. He produced Le Vent De L'Hiver by French artist Raphael in Paris and New York. He produced and mixed the Kristeen Young album Music for Strippers, Hookers, and the Odd On-Looker, released in 2009, and arranged the Fall Out Boy album Folie à Deux. 2010 marked the release of Richard Barone's Visconti-produced Glow album, which includes five songs co-written with Barone and a remake of T. Rex's "Girl"; he also played bass, guitar, synth, and Stylophone on the album and performed live in concert with Barone on numerous occasions.

Visconti produced the 2013 David Bowie album The Next Day and remixed and remastered both The Slider anniversary box set and Electric Warrior 40th-anniversary box set by T. Rex. In 2013, he produced Solar Secrets by Capsula.

In 2014, Visconti produced and arranged several tracks on Marc Almond's album The Dancing Marquis. Almond had wanted to work with Visconti since hearing some of Visconti's earliest production work with T-Rex and David Bowie, stating, "It was a dream to work with Tony".

From 2016 to 2023, Visconti was a jury member of the ANCHOR-Award, linked to the Reeperbahn Festival.

In 2018, Visconti produced Evil Spirits for The Damned, their first album in ten years. He also produced, sang, and played recorder on Merrie Land, the second album by The Good, the Bad & the Queen (2018).

In 2019, Visconti produced the song "The Dragon Cries" with Band-Maid vocalists Miku Kobato and Saiki Atsumi. The track was released on Band-Maid's 2019 release Conqueror.

Visconti served as music producer on the 2022 film Moonage Daydream, a documentary about Bowie written, produced, directed, and edited by Brett Morgen.

== Personal life ==
After divorcing his first wife, Siegrid, Visconti married Welsh folk singer Mary Hopkin in 1971; they divorced in 1981. The pair have two children, including musician Jessica Lee Morgan. In 1989, he married his third wife, May Pang; they had two children before they divorced in 2000. Visconti currently lives with his girlfriend of 20 years, musician Kristeen Young.

== Musician ==
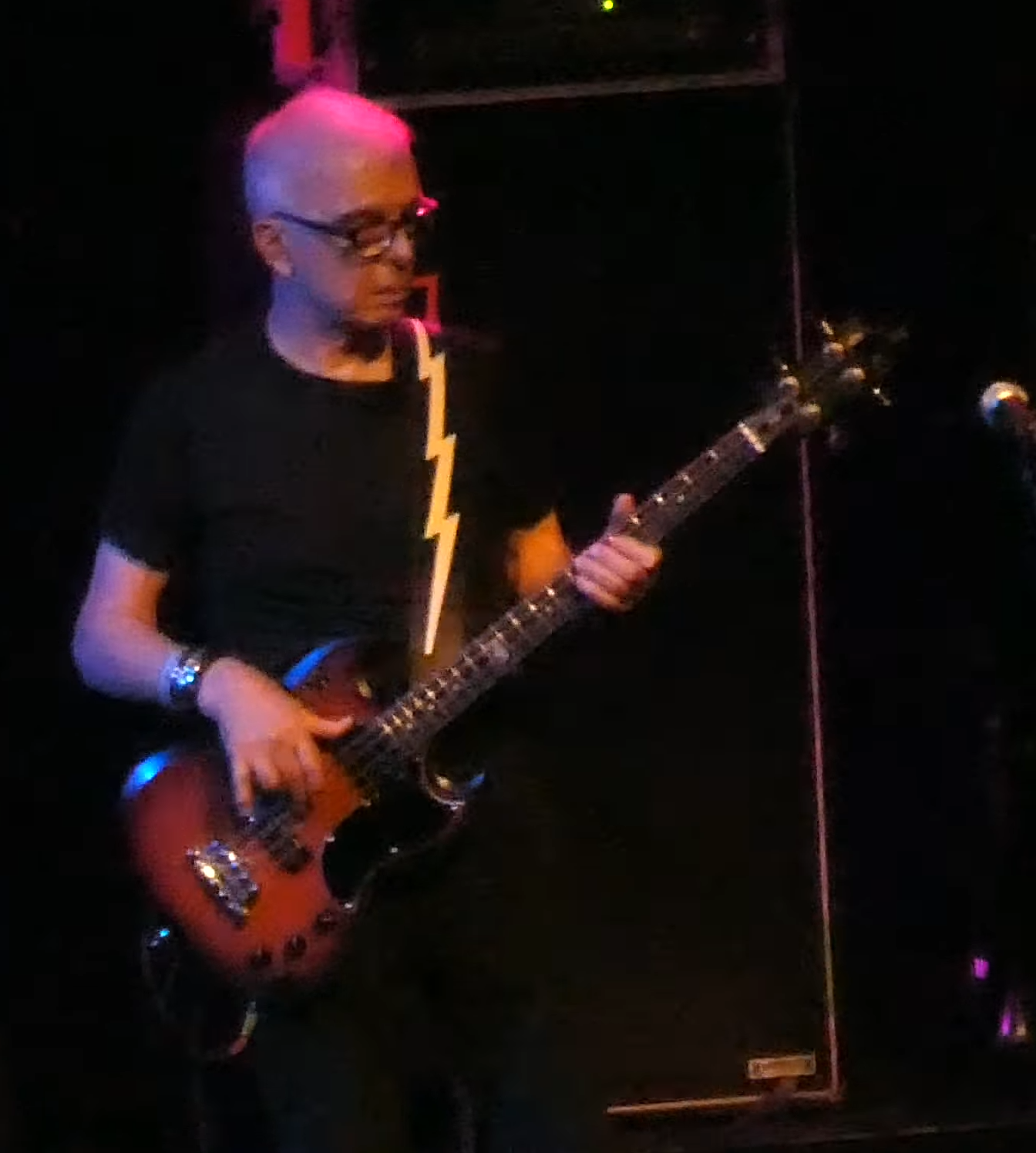
Visconti playing bass with Holy Holy in 2017

Visconti played bass on David Bowie's 1970 album The Man Who Sold the World. Since 2015, he has toured the UK, Japan, and the US with the Bowie cover band Holy Holy, playing the album in its entirety and other early Bowie classics, along with the album's original drummer Mick Woodmansey and other well-known musicians, including singer Glenn Gregory and guitarist James Stevenson. The band has followed this up with later shows in which they perform The Rise and Fall of Ziggy Stardust and the Spiders from Mars album.

== Visconti Studio ==
In September 2016, Kingston University opened Visconti Studio, a tape-based recording studio in partnership with Visconti, the British Library, and London's Science Museum.

== Discography ==
=== Studio albums ===
- Visconti's Inventory (1977)
- It's a Selfie (2019)
- Apollo 80 (2024)

=== Albums produced ===
With Tyrannosaurus Rex / T. Rex

- 1968: My People Were Fair and Had Sky in Their Hair... But Now They're Content to Wear Stars on Their Brows
- 1968: Prophets, Seers & Sages: The Angels of the Ages
- 1969: Unicorn
- 1970: A Beard of Stars
- 1970: T. Rex
- 1971: Electric Warrior
- 1972: Bolan Boogie
- 1972: The Slider
- 1973: Tanx
- 1974: Zinc Alloy and the Hidden Riders of Tomorrow
- 1981: In Concert – (1971/72 recordings)

With David Bowie

- 1969: David Bowie
- 1970: The Man Who Sold the World
- 1974: David Live
- 1975: Young Americans
- 1977: Low
- 1977: "Heroes"
- 1978: Stage
- 1979: Lodger
- 1980: Scary Monsters (And Super Creeps)
- 2002: Heathen
- 2003: Reality
- 2013: The Next Day
- 2016: Blackstar
- 2018: Welcome to the Blackout (Live London '78)
- 2018: Glastonbury 2000

With Badfinger

- 1969: Maybe Tomorrow (as The Iveys)
- 1970: Magic Christian Music – Badfinger

With Gentle Giant

- 1970: Gentle Giant
- 1971: Acquiring the Taste

With Strawbs

- 1970: Dragonfly
- 1970: Just a Collection of Antiques and Curios
- 1971: From the Witchwood
- 1972: Grave New World

With Mary Hopkin

- 1971: Earth Song/Ocean Song
- 2007: Valentine (1972–80)
- 2008: Recollections (1970–86)
- 2009: Now and Then (1970–88)

With Osibisa

- 1971: Osibisa
- 1971: Woyaya

With Tom Paxton

- 1972: Peace Will Come
- 1973: New Songs For Old Friends

With Ralph McTell

- 1972: Not till Tomorrow
- 1974: Easy
- 2019: Hill of Beans

With Carmen

- 1973: Fandangos in Space
- 1974: Dancing on a Cold Wind

With Sparks

- 1975: Indiscreet
- 1997: Plagiarism

With Omaha Sheriff

- 1977: Come Hell or Waters High
- 1977: Long Fingers in the Soft Rain

With Thin Lizzy

- 1977: Bad Reputation
- 1978: Live and Dangerous
- 1979: Black Rose

With Hazel O'Connor

- 1980: Breaking Glass
- 1981: Cover Plus

With Boomtown Rats

- 1980: Mondo Bongo
- 1982: V Deep

With Elaine Paige

- 1983: Stages
- 1984: Cinema
- 1985: Love Hurts
- 1986: Christmas

With Modern Romance

- 1983: Trick of the Light
- 1985: Burn It!

With The Moody Blues

- 1986: The Other Side of Life
- 1988: Sur la Mer
- 1991: Keys of the Kingdom

With Les Rita Mitsouko

- 1986: The No Comprendo
- 1988: Marc & Robert

With Phillip Boa

- 1993: Boaphenia
- 1994: God – Phillip Boa

With Dean & Britta

- 2003: L'Avventura
- 2007: Back Numbers

With Kristeen Young

- 2003: Breasticles
- 2004: X
- 2006: The Orphans
- 2009: Music for Strippers, Hookers, and the Odd On-Looker
- 2011: V The Volcanic
- 2014: The Knife Shift
- 2017: Live at the Witch's Tit

With Alejandro Escovedo

- 2008: Real Animal
- 2010: Street Songs of Love
- 2012: Big Station

With other artists

- 1968: Ten Songs - Tucker Zimmerman
- 1969: Battersea Power Station – Junior's Eyes
- 1970: Seasons – Magna Carta
- 1971: Woman Child – Marsha Hunt
- 1973: Gas Works – Gas Works
- 1973: World's Apart Together – The Sarstedt Brothers
- 1975: Counterpoints – Argent
- 1977: Better by Far – Caravan
- 1977: The Idiot – Iggy Pop
- 1978: Down in the Bunker – Steve Gibbons
- 1979: Rhapsodies – Rick Wakeman
- 1979: Ghostown – The Radiators
- 1980: Ashes and Diamonds – Zaine Griff
- 1981: Afraid of Mice – Afraid of Mice
- 1981: La folie – The Stranglers
- 1982: Animation – Jon Anderson
- 1982: All of a Sudden – John Hiatt
- 1983: Bite – Altered Images
- 1983: Battle Hymns for Children Singing – Haysi Fantayzee
- 1984: Difford & Tilbrook – Difford & Tilbrook
- 1985: Vive Le Rock – Adam Ant
- 1985: Moving Mountains – Justin Hayward
- 1989: Change – The Alarm
- 1990: Electric Angels – Electric Angels
- 1991: Days Of Heaven – Pleasure Bombs
- 1993: Elle et Louis – Louis Bertignac
- 1993: Faux rêveur – Marc Lavoine
- 1995: Whatever Makes You Happy – The Dwellers
- 1997: Do It Yourself – The Seahorses
- 2001: The Gunman and Other Stories – Prefab Sprout
- 2001: ¡Viva Nueva! – Rustic Overtones
- 2003: Stage One – Marizane
- 2004: Beyond Elysian Fields – Hugh Cornwell
- 2004: Lifeblood – Manic Street Preachers
- 2005: No Balance Palace – Kashmir
- 2006: Ringleader of the Tormentors – Morrissey
- 2007: Djin Djin – Angélique Kidjo
- 2008: The Bright Lights of America – Anti-Flag
- 2008: Je Sais Que La Terre Est Plate – Raphaël
- 2010: You Love You – Semi Precious Weapons
- 2010: Glow – Richard Barone
- 2010: Calling All Magicians – Danielle Spencer
- 2011: The Future Is Medieval – Kaiser Chiefs
- 2012: Manhattanhenge – Debbie Clarke
- 2013: Solar Secrets – Capsula
- 2014: The Dancing Marquis – Marc Almond
- 2016: Emily's D+Evolution – Esperanza Spalding
- 2016: Optimist in Black – Daphne Guinness
- 2018: Evil Spirits – The Damned
- 2018: Merrie Land – The Good, the Bad & the Queen
- 2019: Kind Heaven – Perry Farrell
- 2021: A Night To Remember – Brion Starr
- 2024: Daisy the Great vs. Tony Visconti – Daisy the Great

== Publications ==
- The Autobiography: Bowie, Bolan and the Brooklyn Boy. New York: HarperCollins, 2007. ISBN 978-0-00-722944-4. With a foreword by Morrissey.
