= Justin Hayward =

British rock musician (born 1946)

Justin Hayward OBE
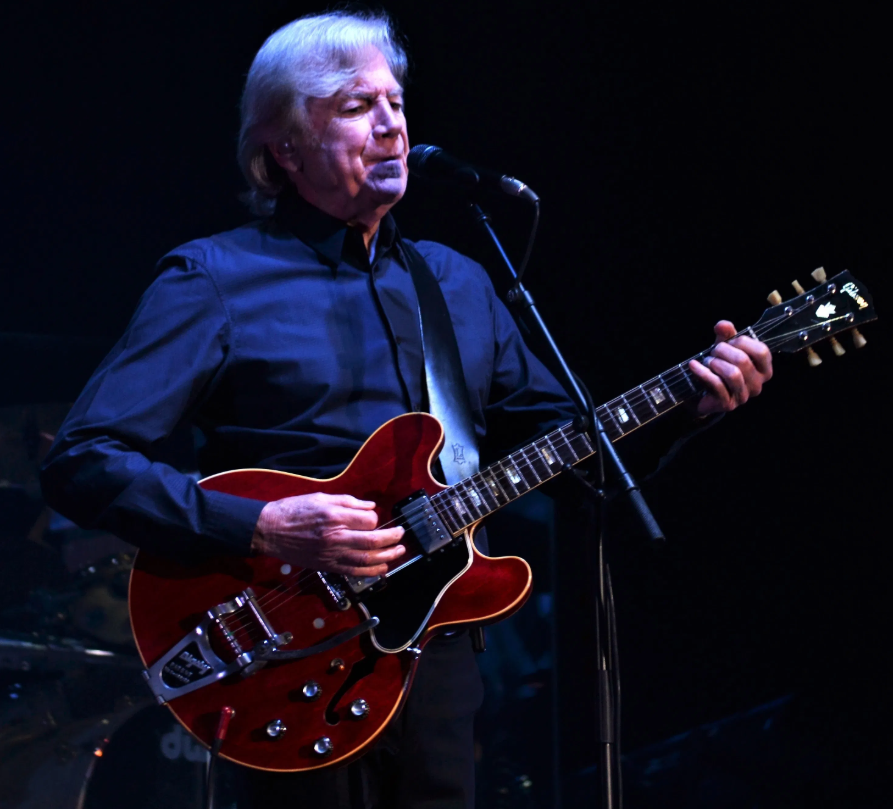
- Hayward performing in 2018

Background information
- Born: David Justin Hayward; 14 October 1946 (age 80); Swindon, Wiltshire, England
- Genres: Rock; progressive rock
- Occupations: Musician; songwriter
- Instruments: Guitar; vocals
- Years active: 1965–present
- Labels: Pye; Parlophone; Threshold; Deram; Polydor; CMC International; Trax; Towerbell Records; Armour Records
- Website: justinhayward.com

David Justin Hayward OBE (born 14 October 1946) is an English musician. He was the guitarist and frontman of the rock band the Moody Blues from 1966 until its dissolution in 2018. He became the group's principal vocalist and its most prolific songwriter over the 1967–1974 period, and composed several international hit singles for the band. With John Lodge's death in 2025, Hayward is the last surviving member of the classic Moody Blues lineup.

Singles written by Hayward for the Moody Blues include "Nights in White Satin", "Tuesday Afternoon", "Never Comes the Day", "Question", "The Voice", "I Know You're Out There Somewhere" and "English Sunset"; he wrote 20 of the group's 27 post-1967 singles. He also has a solo career. His first album outside the Moody Blues, Blue Jays, a collaboration with John Lodge, reached the UK top five in 1975. The single "Blue Guitar", recorded with 10cc as the backing band, reached the UK top ten in 1975, and his 1978 recording of "Forever Autumn" from Jeff Wayne's Musical Version of The War of the Worlds reached the UK top five.

In 2018 Hayward was inducted into the Rock and Roll Hall of Fame as a member of the Moody Blues and in 2022 was appointed Officer of the Order of the British Empire (OBE) for services to the music industry.

== Early life and early career ==
Hayward was born in Dean Street, Swindon, Wiltshire, the son of two teachers. He was educated at Shrivenham Primary School in nearby Shrivenham, Oxfordshire, and at the Commonweal School in Swindon. Tall for his age, at Commonweal School he acquired the nickname "legs". He was playing in several bands as early as the age of 15, when he bought a Gibson 335, a guitar that appears on nearly all of his records throughout his career, and a Vox AC30 amplifier. All previous guitars were "unsatisfactory" and required modification. He performed with local Swindon groups in clubs and dance halls playing mostly Buddy Holly songs. One of Hayward's early groups was All Things Bright, which opened for The Hollies and Brian Poole and the Tremeloes. When he was 18 he signed an eight-year publishing contract as a songwriter with the skiffle artist and record producer Lonnie Donegan, a move Hayward later regretted, as it meant the rights to all his songs written before 1974 would always be owned by Donegan's Tyler Music. In 1965 he answered an advertisement in Melody Maker and auditioned as guitarist for Marty Wilde and he went on to work with Wilde and his wife in The Wilde Three.

== The Moody Blues ==
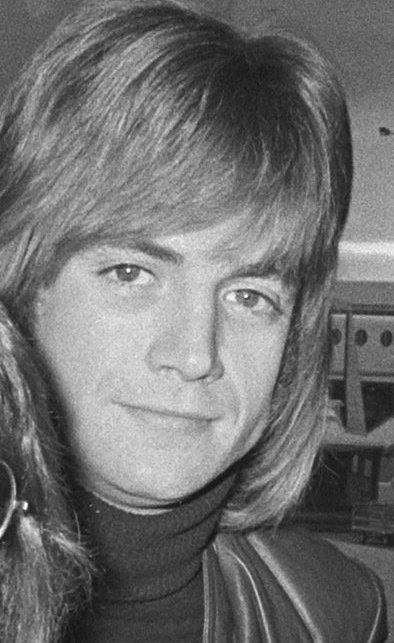
Hayward in 1970

In 1966, after answering another ad in Melody Maker, this time placed by Eric Burdon of The Animals, Hayward was contacted by Mike Pinder of the Moody Blues after Burdon had passed on Hayward's letter and demo discs to Pinder. Within a few days, Hayward had replaced departing Moody Blues vocalist and guitarist Denny Laine. At the same time bassist John Lodge replaced the departed Clint Warwick.

After beginning by singing the old blues-inspired repertoire of the Moody Blues' 1964–1965 era, Hayward's initial artistic contribution to the Moody Blues was his song "Fly Me High", which was a Decca single early in 1967. It failed to chart, but gave the revised band a new direction forward from the R&B sound they had been largely producing up to that point.

Hayward's driving rocker "Leave This Man Alone" was then used as the B-side of their next single on Decca, backing Pinder's "Love And Beauty" (1967), the first Moody Blues record to feature the Mellotron. Hayward and Lodge's integration into the Moody Blues along with Pinder's use of the Mellotron sparked greater commercial success and recognition for the band, transforming them into one of pop music's biggest-selling acts.

The 1967 album Days of Future Passed, one of the first and most influential symphonic rock albums, gave rise to the Hayward-penned singles "Tuesday Afternoon" and "Nights in White Satin". The latter record went on to sell over two million copies, charting three times in the UK (1967, 1972 and 1979), and has been recorded by many other recording artists. Hayward's B-side song "Cities" was an early ecology-themed item.

The Moody Blues' attempts to come up with another hit single during 1967–68 had them record three other Hayward compositions; "Long Summer Days", "King and Queen" and "What Am I Doing Here?", all of which were then left unissued, but together with unissued songs by Pinder and Lodge they later formed the 'studio side four' of Decca's 1977 release Caught Live Plus Five which largely comprised a December 1969 live recording of a concert at the Royal Albert Hall (issued against the group's wishes).

Hayward also co-wrote with Ray Thomas the album tracks "Visions of Paradise", "Are You Sitting Comfortably?", "Watching and Waiting", and, much later, "Never Blame the Rainbows for the Rain". He later co-wrote many songs with John Lodge for the Moody Blues, notably "Gemini Dream" (a US chart hit), "Meet Me Halfway", "Talkin' Talkin'", "Want to Be With You", "Once is Enough", "Strange Times" and "Sooner or Later (Walkin' on Air)", among others.

In addition to delivering the lead vocals on his own compositions, Hayward took a featured lead or co-lead vocal on other band members' songs, including "Dawn is a Feeling" (Pinder); "Gimmie A Little Somethin'", "Isn't Life Strange", "Candle of Life" (Lodge); "After You Came", "I'll Be Level With You", "The Spirit" and "Nothing Changes" (Edge).

Hayward's songs opened each of the Moody Blues albums in their 'post-Mike Pinder era' since Long Distance Voyager in 1981, and his songs, both solo compositions and those co-written with Lodge, plus his lead vocals, harmony voice and guitar playing, were a major factor in the band's work from 1981 onward.

Their album sales from 1978 to the present total more than 60 million. This is the regularly quoted estimate of their album sales, since the total sales of their albums before 1978 are disputed owing to lack of official record company data, However, the period 1967 to 1974 was when their albums (and singles) were charting highest in the UK and US plus worldwide (album track "Melancholy Man" (Pinder) made number one in France as a single in 1970) - Days of Future Passed topped the US album charts on reissue in 1972, then was followed into the album charts by the new studio album Seventh Sojourn.

== Hiatus and Blue Jays / solo work ==
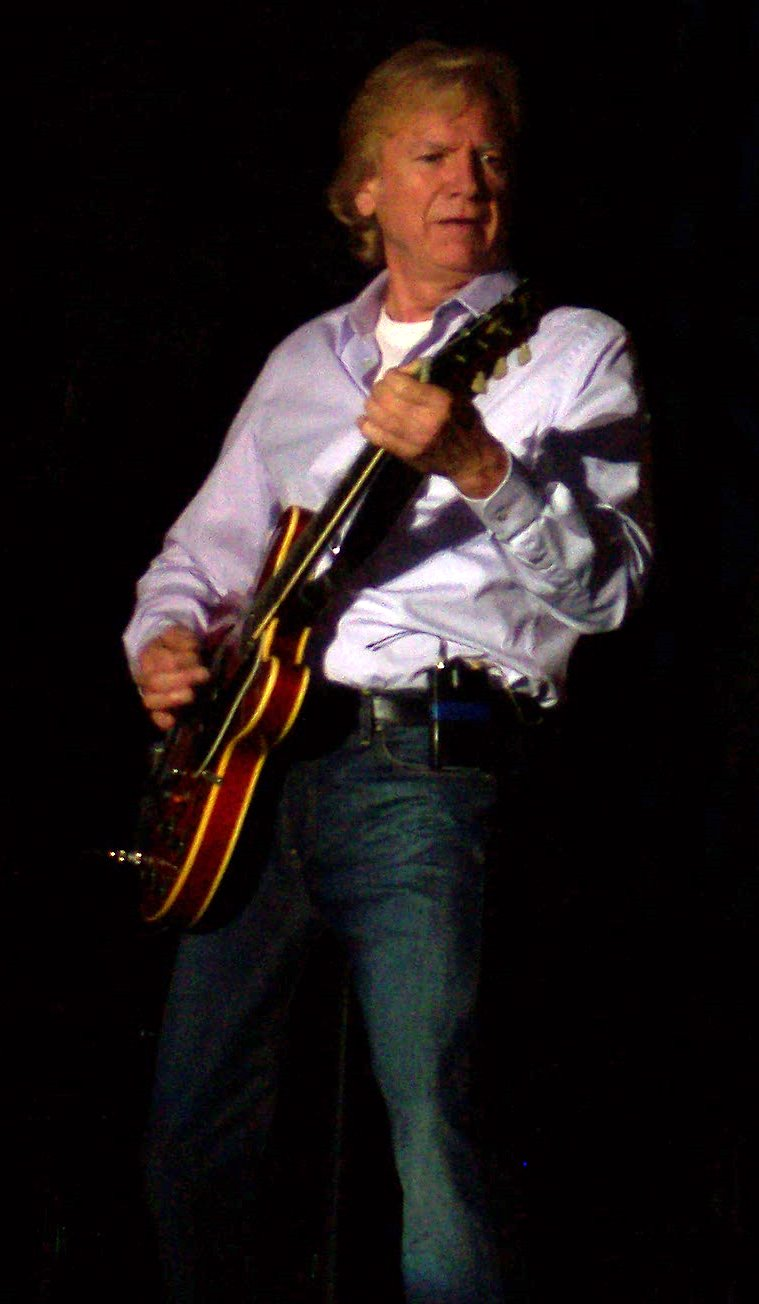
Hayward in 2007

In 1974, the Moody Blues decided to take what ended up being a four-year break from performing and recording. Hayward continued working with Lodge and producer Tony Clarke, using musicians from the Moody Blues' label, Threshold, and sounding very much like the mother group. Together, they had a hit in 1975 with "Blue Guitar" (a Hayward recording with the band 10cc) and released an album titled Blue Jays.

In 1977, Hayward recorded his first solo album Songwriter. He enjoyed international solo success in 1978 when he appeared on Jeff Wayne's Musical Version of The War of the Worlds concept album, which yielded his hits "Forever Autumn" and "The Eve of the War". Wayne later contributed to Hayward's 1980 album Night Flight.

Hayward issued a rare non-album single "Marie" backed by "Heart of Steel' (Decca F13834) in April 1979, both sides composed by him, the 'A' side dedicated to his wife. These tracks were later included among the bonus tracks on a CD reissue of his Songwriter solo album in 2004.

During the 1980s, Hayward composed and performed for film and television, including the theme song "It Won't Be Easy" for the 1987 BBC2 science-fiction series Star Cops, "Something Evil, Something Dangerous" for the film Howling IV: The Original Nightmare, "Eternal Woman" for the film She and music for the animated television series The Shoe People.

In 1989, with producer-arranger Mike Batt, Hayward released Classic Blue, an album of pop standards written by other song writers set to orchestration arranged by Batt. Classic Blue included a version of Led Zeppelin's hit "Stairway to Heaven". Hayward's solo album The View from the Hill was released in 1996 and a live recording, Live in San Juan Capistrano, followed in 1998.

On 10 March 1997, Hayward was featured on the BBC One's programme This Is Your Life with Michael Aspel.

Hayward contributed vocals to a song on Rick Wakeman's 1999 album Return to the Centre of the Earth.

In June 2003, he gave several performances at the Rock and Roll Hall of Fame. Later that year, he sang along with other rock singers on another orchestral album, consisting of Moody Blues songs with the Frankfurt Rock Orchestra, titled Justin Hayward and Friends Perform the Hits of the Moody Blues (alternatively called Justin Hayward and Friends Sing the Moody Blues Classic Hits). Hayward was later involved in a legal dispute, since resolved, arguing he was not paid for his participation on the album.

In April 2006, Hayward took part in the stage tour of Jeff Wayne's Musical Version of The War of the Worlds, reprising his role in autumn 2007 in Australia and in the UK in December 2007. He did so again in the UK in June 2009 and appeared on the tour in November and December 2010.

The Moody Blues, with Hayward, Lodge and original drummer Graeme Edge, continued to tour extensively, and in a BBC World Service interview, Hayward and Lodge made it clear they had no plans to stop working, regarding it as "a privilege" to still be working in the music industry. In an interview in 2005, Edge said if he remained in good health, he could go on for 10 more years.

In 2011, Hayward contributed to the Moody Blues bluegrass tribute album Moody Bluegrass TWO...Much Love along with Moody Blues bandmates Lodge, Edge, Thomas and Pinder. Hayward sang lead vocal on his song "It's Cold Outside Of Your Heart". Many other Hayward songs are featured on this album as well as 2004's Moody Bluegrass: A Nashville Tribute to the Moody Blues.

On 10 December 2011, Hayward, along with Ian Anderson from Jethro Tull and Bruce Dickinson from Iron Maiden, played a concert together at Canterbury Cathedral.

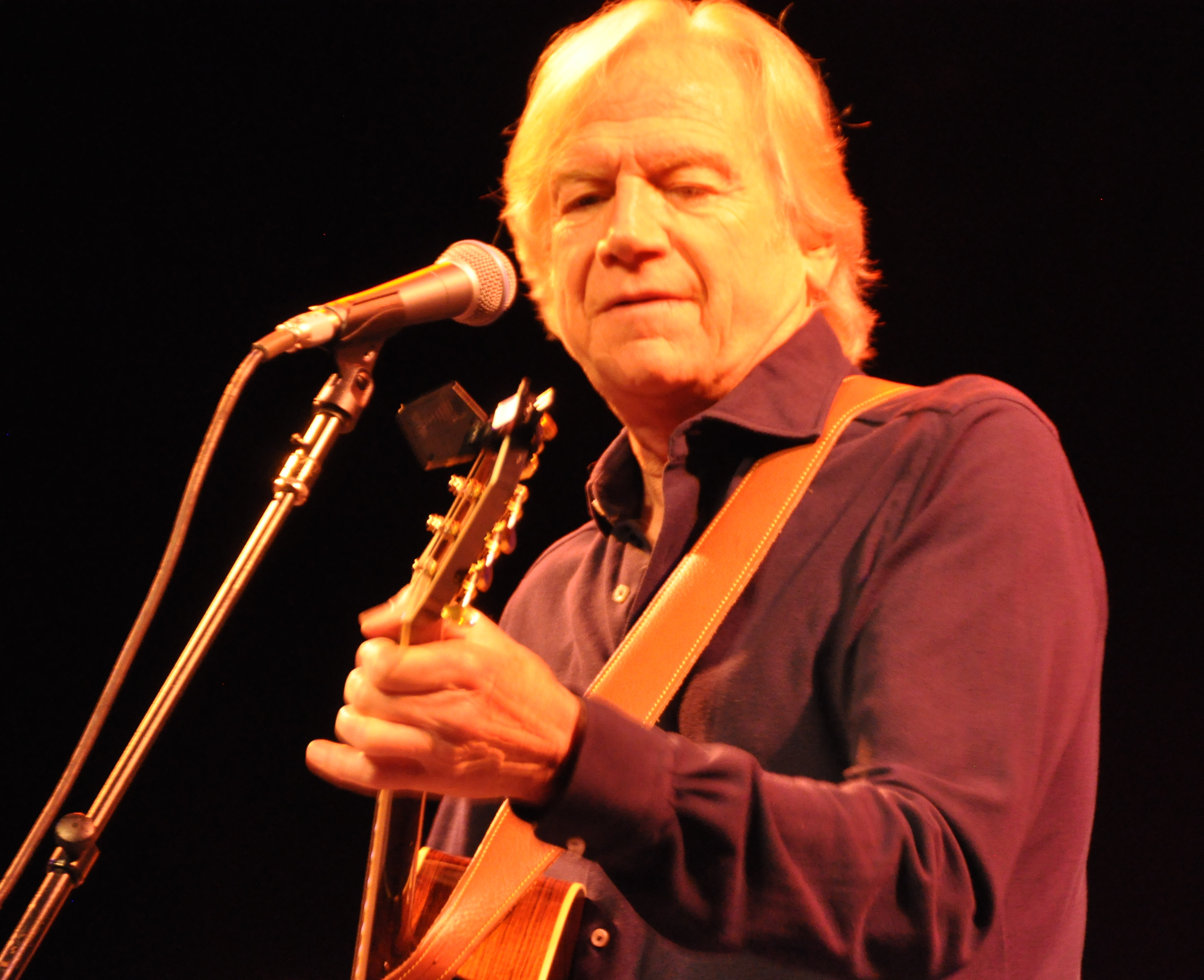
Hayward in 2014

In February 2013, Hayward released his solo album Spirits of the Western Sky on the Eagle Rock label. He toured solo with this album on the East coast of the US in August 2013, to much acclaim, with Moody Blues keyboardist Alan Hewitt and vocalist Julie Ragins. The opening act and accompanying guitarist in the main show was UK's Mike Dawes. The final show of the solo tour, in Atlanta, was recorded by producer/director David Minasian for a live DVD project and a live CD. Recorded at the Buckhead Theatre on 17 August, the resulting DVD, Spirits… Live (2014), features the full concert along with a one-hour behind-the-scenes documentary titled On The Road To Love depicting Hayward's 2013 American tour, also directed by Minasian. Following its release by Eagle Rock/Universal in August 2014, the DVD immediately rose to the No. 2 position on the Billboard Music Video charts and would soon be broadcast by the PBS network. Two additional Hayward/Minasian collaborations quickly followed: a concert DVD filmed in Clearwater, Florida, titled Watching and Waiting, and The Story Behind Nights in White Satin, a documentary which chronicled the origins of Hayward's classic 1967 composition.

In April 2015, Hayward was interviewed on BBC Radio 2's Johnnie Walker show.

The spring of 2016 saw another Hayward release from producer/director David Minasian. Titled Live in Concert at the Capitol Theatre, the DVD contained a few surprises including the first live performance of "You Can Never Go Home" from the 1971 Every Good Boy Deserves Favour LP. Also featured was a bonus studio recording of a new song titled "The Wind of Heaven", a joint composition between Minasian and Hayward. Intended as the main theme for a forthcoming motion picture, the song, with an elaborate music video directed by Minasian, was released ahead of schedule on the DVD to coincide with Hayward's 2016 US solo tour.

Hayward performed during the "On the Blue Cruise" in February 2019. He postponed some tour dates following the cruise "due to a medical condition that prevents me from doing extensive traveling in the next few weeks." In 2022, Hayward rejoined the cast of Jeff Wayne's Musical Version of The War of the Worlds' "Life Begins Again" tour, reprising his role as the Sung Thoughts of the Journalist.

In 2026 he undertook "The Story In Your Eyes" tour, with a band comprising Julie Ragins (keyboard and vocals), Karmen Gould (flute and vocals), Billy Adamson (guitars) and Josh Johnson (guitars and guitar tech). The set included many Moody Blues songs, a Blue Jays song, "Forever Autumn" from the War of the Worlds, some solo songs, and a live question and answer session.

== Instruments ==
For the most part, Hayward has used a red Gibson ES-335, though he also uses other guitars in both performing and recording, including a 1955 Martin D-28 "Dreadnought", a James Olson six-string acoustic, a black Guild acoustic, a Squier Stratocaster (essentially an inexpensive Fender Stratocaster, as Squier is a subsidiary of Fender), a Fender Telecaster, a blonde Guild 12-string acoustic and in 1967 a black Gibson Les Paul. Between 1965 and 1968, he was without his Gibson 335 and relied on other instruments, most notably a 1964 Fender Telecaster and a hand-built 12-string he had renovated for Lonnie Donegan (he eventually bought this guitar from Donegan's widow). However, in an interview included on the Lovely to See You concert DVD (2005), Hayward says the 1963 Gibson 335 has been with him since 1967. Recently, he has played a Collings D3 on stage and on recordings. Among other instruments, Hayward also played mandolin on A Question of Balance and sitar on In Search of the Lost Chord.

== Personal life ==
Written at the end of one love affair and the beginning of another, the 1967 song "Nights in White Satin" was, according to Hayward, "in adoration of all women". Hayward married Ann Marie Guirron on 19 December 1970. His daughter, Doremi, who sings on the track "Raised on Love" on Hayward's 1977 album Songwriter, was born on 3 December 1972.

In 2013 Hayward spoke of learning Transcendental Meditation in 1967, along with other members of the Moody Blues.

With John Lodge’s death in 2025, Hayward is now the last remaining member of the classic Moody Blues lineup.

== Honours and awards ==
Hayward was awarded the first of numerous awards from the American Society of Composers, Authors and Publishers (ASCAP) for songwriting in 1974. In 1985, the Moody Blues picked up the Ivor Novello Award for Outstanding Contribution to Music, and in 1988, Hayward received the Novello, among other honours, for Composer of the Year for "I Know You're Out There Somewhere". In 2000, he was one of a handful of British artists to receive the "Golden Note" award for lifetime achievement by ASCAP. In 2004, Hayward was awarded the British Academy of Composers & Songwriters's (BASCA) "Gold Badge", for his contribution to Britain's entertainment industry. At the Ivor Novello Awards in London on 16 May 2013 Hayward was given the PRS for Music Award for Outstanding Achievement, which was presented to him by Marty Wilde.

He was appointed Officer of the Order of the British Empire (OBE) in the 2022 Birthday Honours for services to music.

== Discography ==
=== Studio albums ===
Title	Album details	Peak chart positions								Certifications
Title	Album details	UK	AUS	CAN	FIN	NDL	NOR	NZ	US	Certifications
Blue Jays (with John Lodge)	Released: 1975; Label: Deram Records	4	26	19	17	13	16	12	16	UK: Gold
Songwriter	Released: 11 February 1977; Label: Deram Records	28	—	—	—	—	—	—	37	
Night Flight	Released: 1980; Label: Decca Records	41	—	—	—	—	32	—	166	
Moving Mountains	Released: 1985; Label: Towerbell Records	78	—	—	—	—	—	—	—	
Classic Blue	Released: 1989; Label: Trax Records	47	97	—	—	—	—	—	—	
Justin Hayward and Friends Sing the Moody Blues Classic Hits	Released: 1994; Label: Phantom Sound & Music	—	—	—	—	74	—	—	—	
The View from the Hill	Released: 1996; Label: CMC International	—	—	—	—	—	—	—	—	
Spirits of the Western Sky	Released: 2013; Label: Eagle Records	81	—	—	—	95	—	—	142	
"—" denotes releases that did not chart

=== Compilation albums ===
- All the Way (2016)

=== Live albums ===
- Live in San Juan Capistrano (1998)
- Spirits... Live (2014)

=== Video ===
- Live in San Juan Capistrano (1998)
- Spirits... Live (2014)
- Live in Concert at The Capitol Theatre (2016)

=== Extended plays ===
- One Summer Day/My Juliette (2020)
