= Prelude (The Moody Blues album) =

Compilation album by the Moody Blues
- Released: 26 October 1987
- Recorded: 30 March 1967 – 17 November 1968
- Genre: Progressive rock
- Length: 37:33
- Label: London
- Producer: Tony Clarke

The Moody Blues chronology
The Other Side of Life (1986)	Prelude (1987)	Sur la Mer (1988)

Professional ratings
Review scores
Source	Rating
AllMusic	3/5 stars

Prelude is a 1987 compilation album by the English rock band the Moody Blues consisting of tracks from 1967 to 1968, all but one of which were not included on albums.

Tracks 1–4 were previously released on singles in 1967 prior to the release of the Days of Future Passed album. They are the first Moody Blues releases to feature Justin Hayward and John Lodge.

Tracks 5 and 6 were released as non-album B-sides in 1967 and 1968 respectively (track 6, "A Simple Game", was later recorded by the Four Tops and went to number 3 in the UK charts in 1972).

Tracks 7–11 were recorded in 1967 and 1968 but were not released until 1977, when they were the + 5 side of the 1977 Caught Live + 5 album.

Track 12, "Late Lament", which rounds out the album, is the Graeme Edge poem that appears at the end of Days of Future Passed as the second part of "Nights in White Satin". This version is a remix from the 1974 compilation album This Is The Moody Blues, whose release was the first time "Late Lament" was identified as a separate track from "Nights in White Satin".

Though many of these tracks have also appeared on other releases, such as the 1994 Time Traveller box set and the 2006 deluxe CD/SACD editions of Days of Future Passed and In Search of the Lost Chord, Prelude is the only release that contains all these tracks.

== Track listing ==
1. "Fly Me High" (single 1967) (Justin Hayward) – 3:02 (lead singer: Justin Hayward)
2. "I Really Haven't Got the Time" (b-side to "Fly Me High" 1967) (Mike Pinder) – 3:12 (lead singer: Mike Pinder)
3. "Leave This Man Alone" (b-side to "Love and Beauty" 1967) (Hayward) – 3:01 (lead singer: Justin Hayward)
4. "Love and Beauty" (single 1967) (Pinder) – 2:28 (lead singer: Mike Pinder)
5. "Cities" (b-side to "Nights in White Satin" 1967) (Hayward) – 2:27 (lead singer: Justin Hayward)
6. "A Simple Game" (b-side to "Ride My See-Saw" 1968) (Pinder) – 3:47 as (lead singer: Mike Pinder)
7. "Gimme a Little Somethin'" (recorded 1968, released on Caught Live + 5 in 1977) (John Lodge) – 3:18 (lead singers: Justin Hayward, John Lodge)
8. "Please Think About It" (recorded 1967, released on Caught Live + 5 in 1977) (Pinder) – 3:45 (lead singer: Mike Pinder)
9. "Long Summer Days" (recorded 1967, released on Caught Live + 5 in 1977) (Hayward) – 3:18 (lead singer: Justin Hayward)
10. "King and Queen" (recorded 1968, released on Caught Live + 5 in 1977) (Hayward) – 3:57 (lead singer: Justin Hayward)
11. "What Am I Doing Here?" (recorded 1968, released on Caught Live + 5 in 1977) (Hayward) – 3:40 (lead singer: Justin Hayward)
12. "Late Lament" (Days of Future Passed 1967) (Graeme Edge, Peter Knight) – 1:36 (narrator: Mike Pinder)
- Tracks 1–5, 8 and 9 were later released as bonus tracks on the 2006 2-CD/SACD Deluxe Edition of Days of Future Passed and as part of the 2017 2-CD + DVD Deluxe Box Set of the same album.
- Tracks 6 and 11 were later released as bonus tracks on the 2006 2-CD/SACD Deluxe Edition of In Search of the Lost Chord.
- Tracks 6, 7, 10 and 11 were later released as part of the 2018 3-CD + 2-DVD Deluxe Box Set of In Search of the Lost Chord.
