= A Simple Game =

1968 song by the Moody Blues

Single by The Moody Blues
- A-side: "Ride My See-Saw"
- Released: 12 October 1968
- Recorded: 18 July 1968, Decca Studios, London
- Length: 3:44 (original version); 3:18 (This Is The Moody Blues)
- Label: Deram
- Songwriter: Mike Pinder
- Producer: Tony Clarke

"A Simple Game" is a 1968 song by the progressive rock band the Moody Blues. Written and sung by Mike Pinder, it was released as a non-album B-side to "Ride My See-Saw", a track from the album In Search of the Lost Chord. The song was produced by Tony Clarke and arranged by Arthur Greenslade. The track was included in the band's 1974 compilation, This Is The Moody Blues, remixed and with an earlier fade than on the single. It was also included, with its original mix and length, in the 1987 compilation Prelude.

The song was covered by The Four Tops and their version was issued as a single in Britain in September 1971, reaching #3 in the UK and #14 in Ireland. It was issued in the United States in January 1972, reaching #90 on the Billboard Hot 100.

The song was also covered by Billy Ocean on compilations in 2016 and 2017.

== Personnel ==
- Mike Pinder: mellotron, piano, lead vocals
- Justin Hayward: acoustic & electric guitars, backing vocals
- John Lodge: bass guitar, backing vocals
- Ray Thomas: tambourine, backing vocals
- Graeme Edge: drums

== Billy Ocean version ==
A Billy Ocean cover version appears on the double-disc 2016 compilation Here You Are/The Best of Billy Ocean, and it's also on the similar single-disc 2017 compilation Here You Are: The Music of My Life.

== Four Tops version ==
"A Simple Game"

Single by Four Tops
- B-side: "You Stole My Love" (UK); "L.A. (My Town)" (U.S.)
- Released: September 1971 (UK); January 1972 (U.S.)
- Recorded: Wessex Studios, London, England, 5 May 1970
- Genre: Pop, R&B, soul
- Label: Tamla Motown (UK); Motown (U.S.)

Four Tops singles chronology
"MacArthur Park (Part II)" (1971)	"A Simple Game" (1971)	"You Gotta Have Love in Your Heart" (1971)

The Four Tops released a cover version in the UK in 1971. The single peaked at position three on the chart. The song's B-side for the UK release was "You Stole My Love", a song written by Justin Hayward and Tony Clarke.

The song was released as a single in the U.S. in 1972, stalling on the chart at position 90. The B-side, which differed from its UK counterpart, was a song called "L.A. (My Town)".

=== Personnel ===
- Levi Stubbs: vocals
- Abdul "Duke" Fakir: vocals
- Lawrence Payton: vocals
- Renaldo Benson: vocals

=== Chart history ===
Chart (1971/72)	Peak position
Netherlands (Dutch Top 40)	15
UK Singles Chart	3
U.S. Billboard Hot Black Singles	34
U.S. Billboard Hot 100	90
