= Voices in the Sky =

1968 single by the Moody Blues

Single by The Moody Blues

from the album In Search of the Lost Chord
- A-side: "Ride My See-Saw" (US)
- B-side: "Dr. Livingstone, I Presume" (UK)
- Released: 28 June 1968 (UK); September 1968 (US)
- Recorded: 11 March 1968
- Genre: Progressive rock
- Length: 3:29
- Label: Deram
- Songwriter: Justin Hayward
- Producer: Tony Clarke

The Moody Blues singles chronology
| "Tuesday Afternoon" (1968) | "Voices in the Sky" (1968) | "Ride My See-Saw" (1968) |

Official audio
- "Voices in the Sky" on YouTube

"Voices in the Sky" is a 1968 hit single by the progressive rock band the Moody Blues, written by their lead guitarist Justin Hayward. It was released as a UK single in June 1968, with "Dr. Livingstone, I Presume" on the B-side. It was later released on their 1968 album In Search of the Lost Chord, and was the first of two singles from that album, the other being "Ride My See-Saw".

== Personnel ==
- Justin Hayward – vocals, acoustic guitar
- John Lodge – bass guitar, backing vocals
- Mike Pinder – Mellotron, backing vocals
- Ray Thomas – flute, backing vocals
- Graeme Edge – drums, percussion, tabla

== Chart positions ==
Chart performance for "Voices in the Sky"
| Chart (1968) | Peak position |
|---|---|
| UK Singles (Official Charts) | 27 |
