= Dawning Is the Day =

1970 song by the Moody Blues

Song by The Moody Blues

from the album A Question of Balance
- Released: 1970
- Recorded: 1 and 2 June 1970
- Genre: Progressive Rock
- Length: 4:22
- Label: Threshold
- Songwriter(s): Justin Hayward
- Producer(s): Tony Clarke

"Dawning Is the Day" is a song written by Justin Hayward that was first released on the Moody Blues' 1970 album A Question of Balance.

== Recording ==
"Dawning Is the Day" was one of the last songs recorded for A Question of Balance, on 1 and 2 June 1970. The recording used some trickery to capture Hayward's high speed guitar strumming, playing the tape at half speed while recording the part. The tape was played at 7 1/2 inches per second to record and then played back at 15 inches per second to speed it up, similar to the technique the Chipmunks use to get their high pitched sound.

== Lyrics and music ==
Music journalist Geoffrey Freakes described the lyrics as "a simple but joyous celebration of life; wake up, put your troubles behind and appreciate the world around you." Lyrics such as "No one tells the wind which way to blow" exhort the listener to accept facts that are beyond their control. Humanities professor Dirk Dunbar said that the song "[identifies] the human journey as leading toward a revelation and acceptance of nature's way."

The song is a ballad based on Hayward's acoustic guitar. Allmusic critic Lindsay Planer described it as an example of the band's "slightly folksier sound." Moody Blues biographer Marc Cushman described the song as a "gentle and lovely song [that] is surprisingly punctuated by louder-than-expected drum rolls from Graeme Edge. Musicologist Walter Everett believed that "Dawning Is the Day" was modeled on the Beatles' "Mother Nature's Son", particularly citing the "chromatic descent over the tonic at 'Miss Misty Meadow, you will find your way.'"

Freakes praised Edge's drum pattern, which he compared to that of the Beatles' "A Day in the Life". Edge said of his drumming:

What I enjoy about [Justin Hayward's] work is the depth of emotion, the soul, and the obvious effort that has been put into writing the song. With regard to the drums, his songs really don't want hitting-every-drum-in-sight Keith Moon fills. The word "delicate" comes to mind. There's great satisfaction in holding a simple beat right to the edge of monotony and then giving the song a release in the right place, kicking it on.

Freakes also particularly praised the middle eight instrumentation of flute, Mellotron strings and piano chords. He also found the ending of the song "particularly effective", with the line "Listen, we think we have found you" backed by a Mediterranean-sounding mandolin and acoustic guitar.

== Reception ==
Variety and Robert Hilburn of the Los Angeles Times both considered "Dawning Is the Day" one of the best songs on A Question of Balance. Disc and Music Echo also praised the song, especially for Edge's drumming. In his review of Paul McCartney's album Ram, Berwyn Life critic Steve Sparacio praised the "We believe that we can't be wrong" chorus on "Back Seat of My Car", saying that the only comparable chorus he has heard is the "We think we have found you" chorus on "Dawning Is the Day".

Planer said that "Lyrically, the song’s organic nature is reflected in its easy flowing melody" and particularly praised Edge's drumming and Hayward's guitar playing.

A few years after the song's release, it was used in a recruiting commercial for the U.S. Air Force. The band had not given permission for its use and stopped it when they found out. According to keyboardist Mike Pinder in 1996:

They stole it. We didn't like that at all. I took it badly because, for me, the sentiment of the song is one of the best we ever did. From the lyrical content, there's so much heart and soul in there, and it was such a positive message for the time, and still is today, in my estimation. It is one of my all-time-favorite Hayward songs. In fact, I was singing over his shoulder in parts of that song. I was just standing right behind him singing over his shoulder as a warm backup kind of thing.

"Dawning Is the Day" has appeared on several Moody Blues compilation albums, including Time Traveller in 1994.

== Live ==
Hayward included "Dawning Is the Day" in some of his live solo concerts in the 21st century.
