= The Best Way to Travel =

Song by The Moody Blues

from the album In Search of the Lost Chord
- Released: July 1968
- Recorded: 28 May 1968
- Length: 3:14
- Label: Deram Records
- Songwriter(s): Mike Pinder
- Producer(s): Tony Clarke

Official audio
- "The Best Way to Travel" on YouTube

"The Best Way to Travel" is a 1968 song by the progressive rock band the Moody Blues. Written by keyboardist Mike Pinder, it was released on the album In Search of the Lost Chord. A wide stereo panning (ping-pong stereo) effect, made by the pan pots on the Decca Studios custom-built four-track recording console (with 20 microphone inputs) used during 1967–68, is noticeable on this track.

The song features Pinder on lead vocals, with Justin Hayward backing the vocals during the chorus. Pinder also plays lead acoustic guitar, with Hayward on electric guitar.

The song was included on the 2010 compilation album A Monstrous Psychedelic Bubble Exploding in Your Mind: Volume 3 by Amorphous Androgynous.

Writing for The Guardian in 2015, music journalist Rob Chapman said: "Keyboard player Mike Pinder's "(Thinking is) The Best Way to Travel" on the In Search of a Lost Chord album is one of the great "show me the universe and get me home for tea" acid songs, and that quintet of late 60s albums is liberally peppered with memorable psychedelic moments.".

An extract of the song appeared as the opening and closing theme music of the TV play Rumour, written and directed by Mike Hodges, broadcast on 2 March 1970 as part of the anthology series ITV Playhouse.

== Personnel ==
- Mike Pinder ― lead vocals, acoustic guitar, Mellotron
- Justin Hayward ― electric guitar, sitar, backing vocals
- John Lodge ― bass guitar
- Ray Thomas ― flute
- Graeme Edge ― drums, percussion
