= Dr. Livingstone, I Presume (song) =

Song by The Moody Blues, English rock band

Single by The Moody Blues

from the album In Search of the Lost Chord
- A-side: "Voices in the Sky"
- Released: 28 June 1968
- Recorded: January–June 1968
- Label: Deram
- Songwriter(s): Ray Thomas
- Producer(s): Tony Clarke

Official audio"Dr. Livingstone, I Presume" on YouTube

"Dr. Livingstone, I Presume" is a 1968 song by the English rock band the Moody Blues. It was written by the band's flautist Ray Thomas, although he does not play the flute in the song. First released in June 1968 on the B-side of "Voices in the Sky," "Dr. Livingstone, I Presume" is one of Ray Thomas's signature child-themed songs, much like his first composition "Another Morning."

"Dr Livingstone, I Presume" was primarily written about Dr. David Livingstone. The lyrics in the opening verse describe the accomplishments of Dr. Livingstone, who was a Scottish missionary and explorer in central Africa. In a similar manner, the lyrics in later verses describe the accomplishments of Captain Robert Falcon Scott, and Christopher Columbus.

"Dr. Livingstone, I Presume" was later released on the Moody Blues' 1968 album In Search of the Lost Chord, where it was the third track. The band performed the song on the UK television programme Colour Me Pop on 14 September 1968.

The chorus, with the repeated line "We're all looking for someone", was used in the title sequence of the 1968 Thames Television series The Tyrant King, in which a trio of children follow a mysterious character around London.

== Personnel ==
- Ray Thomas ― lead vocals, tambourine
- Justin Hayward ― electric guitars, 6 and 12-string acoustic guitars, backing vocals
- John Lodge ― bass, backing vocals
- Mike Pinder ― Mellotron, piano, backing vocals
- Graeme Edge ― drums
