= Visions of Paradise (The Moody Blues song) =

Song by The Moody Blues

from the album In Search of the Lost Chord
- Released: July 1968
- Recorded: 4 June 1968
- Length: 4:15
- Label: Deram Records
- Songwriters: Justin Hayward, Ray Thomas
- Producer: Tony Clarke

Official audio
- "Visions of Paradise" on YouTube

"Visions of Paradise" is a 1968 song by the progressive rock band the Moody Blues. First released on their album In Search of the Lost Chord, it was written jointly by band members Justin Hayward and Ray Thomas, and was the first of many collaborations between them. The song is primarily led by Justin Hayward's voice and Ray Thomas's flute, with the lyrics describing the writer's perception of paradise.

The song has been described as ".. little else than Thomas’s flute riff and Hayward’s softly picked acoustic. Apparently resuming the drug-trip theme, this song may be even further "out there" than "The Best Way to Travel" with a surreal perception of paradise."

Regarding the song, Hayward has explained:

You have to start with the Mellotron that Mike Pinder was playing. The way he got that sound was by bouncing between machines. We were only on 4-track machines, going up to 8-track for Lost Chord, so he would bounce the whole thing across many times to get that layered sound. That would be very time consuming for him and Derek Varnals, the engineer. They would work on it together.

Meanwhile, other guys were writing in the studio going [imitates a high-pitched, wavering Mellotron] through a progression of chords. So Ray and I found this broom cupboard that was attached to the studio. I'd go there with my acoustic guitar and flute, and we would write those things. It had a sound-proofed door so that the cleaners didn't disturb us. It also had an entrance from the corridor that was also sound-proofed. It was a sealed little place. Everything that we wrote together – including "Visions of Paradise" – all of those things were written there.

In 2008 the band issued a "instrumental sitar mix" of the track as a bonus on their 2008 CD remastered reissue.

== Personnel ==
- Justin Hayward – lead vocals, 6 and 12-string acoustic guitars, sitar
- John Lodge – bass guitar, cello
- Mike Pinder – Mellotron, tambura
- Ray Thomas – alto flute, oboe
- Graeme Edge – percussion
