= Visions of Paradise =

Visions of Paradise may refer to:

- Visions of Paradise (The Moody Blues song), 1968
- Visions of Paradise (Mick Jagger song), 2002
