= Om (The Moody Blues song) =

Song by The Moody Blues

from the album In Search of the Lost Chord
- Released: July 1968
- Recorded: 5 June 1968
- Genre: Raga rock, psychedelic music
- Length: 5:50
- Label: Deram Records
- Songwriter(s): Mike Pinder
- Producer(s): Tony Clarke

"Om" is a song by the British progressive rock band the Moody Blues that was released in July 1968 as the final track of their album In Search of the Lost Chord. It was composed by the band's keyboardist, Mike Pinder. "Om" has a heavy Indian influence and sound to it. The word "Om", which is chanted repeatedly throughout the song, represents Aum, a sacred mantra in the Hindu, Jain, Sikh and Buddhist religions.

On the album, "Om" is preceded by a short spoken-word interlude titled "The Word". "The Word" was written by drummer Graeme Edge and is recited by Pinder. "The Word" explains the album's concept, and that the mantra "Om" is the lost chord referenced in the album's title, which concludes with:

To name the chord is important to some.
So they give it a word,
And the word is "Om"

Like many of the album's preceding tracks, "Om" make use of a variety of instruments. "Om" features both Pinder and Ray Thomas on lead vocals, and playing their usual instruments, Mellotron and flute, respectively. The remaining band members are featured on instrument other than their usual instruments, which includes Justin Hayward on sitar, John Lodge on cello, and Graeme Edge on tabla, a popular Indian percussion instrument used in the classical, popular and devotional music of the Indian subcontinent and in Hindustani classical music.

"Om" is one of several songs in the raga rock style on In Search of the Lost Chord.

While "The Word" and "Om" are generally played together, "The Word" was released on the band's 1974 compilation This Is The Moody Blues without "Om". However, the final word of "The Word", which is also the first word of "Om", was included.

== Personnel ==
- Mike Pinder – lead vocals, tambura, Mellotron, mantra chant
- Ray Thomas – lead vocals, flute, mantra chant
- Justin Hayward – sitar, acoustic guitar, backing vocals, mantra chant
- John Lodge – cello, bass, backing vocals, mantra chant
- Graeme Edge – tabla, hi-hats, tambourine, mantra chant
