= Legend of a Mind =

Song by The Moody Blues

from the album In Search of the Lost Chord
- Released: July 1968
- Recorded: 13 January 1968
- Genre: Progressive rock, psychedelic rock, acid rock
- Length: 6:34
- Label: Deram
- Songwriter: Ray Thomas
- Producer: Tony Clarke

Music video
- "Legend of a Mind" on YouTube

"Legend of a Mind" is a song by the British progressive rock band the Moody Blues, and was written by the band's flutist, Ray Thomas, who provides the lead vocals. "Legend of a Mind" was recorded in January 1968 and was first released on the Moody Blues' album In Search of the Lost Chord. Prominently featuring the Mellotron, it was the first song recorded for the album.

== Background and content ==
The song's lyrics are about 1960s LSD icon Timothy Leary. Leary was an advocate for the use of the drug, enjoying its spiritual benefits, with one of his catchphrases being "Turn on, tune in, drop out." A re-recorded version of the song, with different lyrics, "Legend of a Mind (Timothy Leary Lives)" appears on the 1996 album Beyond Life With Timothy Leary.

The song is perhaps best known for its opening lines: "Timothy Leary's dead / No, n-n-no he's outside looking in", which allude to Leary's use of eastern mysticism (most notably The Tibetan Book of the Dead) to frame the psychedelic experience.

The song's lyrics describe both Leary and the effects of LSD, such as:

He'll fly his astral plane
Takes you trips around the bay
Brings you back the same day

as well as:

He'll take you up,
He'll bring you down.
He'll plant your feet back firmly on the ground.
He flies so high,
He swoops so low.
He knows exactly which way he's gonna go.

"Legend of a Mind" is one of the Moody Blues' longer songs, lasting about six and a half minutes, with a two-minute flute solo by Ray Thomas, in the middle.

During the 1980s, Thomas and keyboardist Patrick Moraz (who joined the band in 1978, replacing Mike Pinder) modified the live performance of the song by composing a flute and keyboard duet as part of the flute solo. The flute and keyboard duet on "Legend of a Mind" was sometimes the most popular part of The Moody Blues concerts, and Ray Thomas often received a standing ovation at the end of the flute solo for his performance. Even after Moraz left the band in 1991, the flute and keyboard duet continued to be performed as part of the song with session-musician Bias Boshell playing the keyboard. A full live recording of the song can be found on the deluxe edition of their live album A Night at Red Rocks with the Colorado Symphony Orchestra.

"Legend of a Mind" was not performed live by the Moody Blues after Thomas had retired from the band in 2002, although it has been performed, in 2019, by John Lodge's solo band.

The original promotional black-and-white film for the song was filmed on location at Groot-Bijgaarden Castle near Brussels in Belgium.

== Personnel ==
- Ray Thomas ― lead vocals, flute
- Justin Hayward ― 6-string and 12-string acoustic guitars, electric guitars, backing vocals
- John Lodge ― bass, backing vocals
- Mike Pinder ― Mellotron, piano, backing vocals
- Graeme Edge ― drums, percussion, tabla
