= A Question of Balance =

Studio album by the Moody Blues
- Released: 7 August 1970
- Recorded: January–June 1970
- Studios: Decca, London
- Genres: Progressive rock; folk rock
- Length: 38:41
- Label: Threshold
- Producer: Tony Clarke

The Moody Blues chronology
To Our Children's Children's Children (1969)	A Question of Balance (1970)	Every Good Boy Deserves Favour (1971)

Singles from A Question of Balance
- 1. "Question" Released: 24 April 1970

Professional ratings
Review scores
Source	Rating
AllMusic	3/5 stars
Rolling Stone	(unrated)

A Question of Balance is the sixth album by the Moody Blues. Released in 1970, it reached No. 1 in the United Kingdom and No. 3 in the United States.

== Background ==
The album was an attempt by the group to strip down their previously lush, psychedelic sound in order to be better able to perform the songs in concert. Guitarist Justin Hayward remembered: "...we were all convinced that we had to record an album of songs that could easily translate into effective live performances. In a way, we almost reverted to performing live in the studio, without venturing too much into the world of overdubs." On another occasion, he said: "...[in] doing the A Question of Balance album...[we were] getting back to that place where we [...] could just sit around in a room and play."

The album's lyrics are on a theme of asking questions and finding meaning in the world. In Hayward's words: "On the first side, we were asking ourselves the question, and on the second side, we are starting to answer it. Looking for the answers will keep us going for a long time." The album title is from the first and last tracks on the album, "Question" and "Balance". According to drummer Graeme Edge, "We very much wanted to reflect what the title says: that maintaining yourself is a question of balance. That [time] was the start of where we were almost treated as semi-deities. It's very hard to maintain your equilibrium under those pressures."

== Writing ==
Apart from the desire to record songs with simpler arrangements, keyboardist Mike Pinder remembered the album as being more influenced by domestic life as well as global concerns: "We were all getting married and having kids. That was really the difference. We'd settled down. [...] These are all songs that we lived. They were all songs about how we can be better, the kinds of things we can leave behind and move forward. [...] ...people live in the left side of their brain. And the right side of the brain is where creativity takes place. Ingenuity, ideas, concepts — all those things come through on the right side of the brain. I've always looked at it that way, from a spiritual point of view, as opposed to a religious point of view. [...] And so the emotions were really all about love and peace and everything, but also about intelligence and about consciousness. Trying to wake people up from bad habits. Bad habits in my book are something that hurt other people, innocent people."

Hayward has reflected on his songwriting process at the time: "I've had so many small parts of songs that I've just enjoyed playing, and it takes me a while to realize: 'This is a song. If I just work at it a bit more, I've got a whole song here.' Inspiration has to find you working, and not just toying around. So it's a question of prompting myself to actually use some of the bits I've been enjoying on the guitar and make a song out of them."

"Question", the lead track on the album, was written by Hayward as a protest song about war. The group were influenced by their experiences interacting with Americans on their concert tours, and the fear and anger about the draft during the Vietnam war. He explains, "I'd written 'Question' on the morning of the recording session. It was recorded in just a few takes. I was very aware of the anti-war movement in America which had grown thanks to the Vietnam War. It was a protest song about the state of the world, which I feel is still very relevant today." He continues, "I got very angry one night listening to the news about the war in Vietnam. The only reason to have a war to me is to do with starvation...people fighting for their lives. But just for a bit of territory, a bit of land somewhere, was stupid. In my own naïve way, I put a lot of those feelings into Question." He elaborates on the song's sentiment:

"...we were playing a lot of student venues and colleges [in the United States], and the student audience was our audience. We were mixing with these people and seeing how different the problems were for them and the issues in being a member of the greatest nation on earth: the United States. How different they were from British people. I was just expressing my frustration around that, around the problems of anti-war and things that really concerned them, and for their own future that they may be conscripted, drafted. [...] So it did really come out of that. And my own particular anger at what was happening. After a decade of peace and love, it still seemed we hadn't made a difference in 1970. I suppose that was the theme of the song. And then the slow part of the song is [...] not feeling defeated, but almost a quiet reflection of it, and mixing with a bit of a love song, as well."

"Question" was arranged shortly before the recording session. Hayward had been struggling to finalize two different songs that happened to be in the same key, and decided to present the two songs as a single work. He remembers: "That was a song written under pressure. There was a Moody session set at Decca studios on a Saturday. At midnight that Friday I still didn't have anything for the session the next day. I had parts of two songs that were in the same key but were vastly different. About four o'clock in the morning I thought, 'Oh shit, all I can do is try to put them together and make them work, somehow.' I took it into the studio the next morning and I played it to the guys and they said, 'That's great!' They never even thought about it being two songs. There is a lot of social commentary in that song. I was reflecting what was happening in the college circuit that we were playing at the time."

The lyrics of Mike Pinder's "How Is It (We Are Here)" poke fun at the concept of Fort Knox. Pinder points out the irony of damaging the environment to dig up precious metals and refine them, only to then place them right back into the ground again at depositories.

Ray Thomas's "And the Tide Rushes In" is a reflection on the impermanence of material things. It was inspired by conflict with his ex-wife. He said: "'And the Tide Rushes In' was recorded after a big argument with my ex-wife. And I say...'You keep looking for someone to tell your troubles to, I'll sit down and lend an ear yet I hear nothing new.' Just complaining, then the tide rushes in and washes my castle away." He remembered producer Tony Clarke making light of the fact that the situation was productive creatively: "I remember Tony Clarke saying to her that she ought to have more rows with me because he considered it such a great song."

Graeme Edge contributed "Don't You Feel Small": "It started basically as a bit of a go about ecology, and then I saw in it [...] the way people seem to be allowing themselves to be made to feel very insignificant by establishment things." The song is sung by the band's four singers, though Edge made an attempt at singing the song during the sessions.

"Tortoise and the Hare", written by bassist John Lodge, takes direct inspiration from the fable by Aesop. He sees the song as a metaphor for the band: "It was really a sort of analogy, really, of the Moody Blues. You know, everyone else was racing away. We were just trying to say, 'If we just keep on going [with] exactly what we really believe, we're going to last and [beat out] everyone'."

Hayward's "It's Up to You" was inspired by one of his relationships; he wrote the song on his newly acquired cherry red Gibson guitar. Pinder interpreted a broader meaning from the song, one of taking responsibility on an individual level for global problems. He explains, "'It's Up to You' is very much a starker reality that people still need to realize, that it's up to the individual to make anything better, whether it be a political vote or in conserving water or in not polluting the planet."

Pinder described "Melancholy Man" as taking a global perspective and as lamenting society's ability to address its broadest challenges. "The melancholy part of it is the melancholy for the human race and for the planet is what it's about. What was that line? 'I might not make it there with you' the famous line of Martin Luther King. [King] was very much on my mind." On another occasion, he said: "The single most incorrect interpretation of "Melancholy Man" has been that maybe it was a song about me being melancholy. I used that as a way of saying that there are different levels of melancholy, and that this was a melancholy for the whole world because of the impending breakdown of the structure in all things that we have seen happen since the song came out. What we're seeing now is just more results of what was being done then and what continues to be done by the industrial giants and governments of the world, and the greedy little cigar-smoking guys like on the album cover."

The final track, "The Balance", centres around a spoken narration. The accompanying music was originally arranged for Lodge's song "Tortoise and the Hare", which was later reworked.

== Recording ==
The album was recorded between January and June 1970 at both Wessex Sound Studios and the band's familiar Studio One at Decca studios in West Hampstead. Tony Clarke once again served as producer alongside engineer Derek Varnals. Sessions between 17 and 31 January yielded the backing tracks for "It's Up to You", "Tortoise and the Hare", "And the Tide Rushes In", "Don't You Feel Small" and "Question". "Minstrel's Song" was recorded on 10 March. Sessions from 1 to 6 June produced "Dawning is the Day", "Melancholy Man", "How Is It (We Are Here)" and "The Balance".

The sessions were very unlike the technique of recording the previous album, To Our Children's Children's Children; instead, they featured minimal overdubs and an simpler, more natural sound that the band could more readily replicate on stage. Hayward remembers: "With "Question", the song, recorded before the album, there's no double-tracking, just echo and a big old 12-string guitar. We learned to play that the old-fashioned way and just recorded it one Saturday. It was a deliberate attempt to try and pull back to something more real."

Despite the simpler production overall, the album does feature some unique studio techniques. Some of Hayward's guitar work on "Dawning is the Day" was recorded at half-speed to create a mandolin-like effect. Hayward credits the expertise of Varnals and Clarke in capturing his desired guitar sound throughout the album: "Oh, they were really superb. Derek Varnals — I have to credit him with my guitar sound in the early days. On those early records, I played acoustic and electric. He captured all of that just beautifully. I'd put the acoustic lines down first, and then we'd do the electric stuff, maybe with the other guys playing at the same time. There's a song called "It's Up to You" where he suddenly nailed it down."

Hayward's and Pinder's guitar work on "Melancholy Man" reminded producer Clarke of the type of music that would appear on a French film soundtrack, and he leaned into that feeling during the song's production, limiting the use of echo on the track. Appropriately, the song subsequently became a number one hit in France, and received heavy airplay in the era surrounding the death of Charles DeGaulle.

== Album cover ==
The album cover is a vertical gate-fold created by Phil Travers. The bottom of the image features a beach scene with beach-goers enjoying the sun while a menacing storm cloud approaches. Travers explains the meaning of the imagery: "The people on the sleeve are actually just sitting there, on holiday, basking in the sunshine with presumably not a care in the world. They just don't notice what's coming up at them and probably won't until it's too late. It's just a symbolic way of putting over what most of us do – we bury our heads until it's too late."

Travers originally included a small painting of John Blashford-Snell in the cover collage. The image was of Snell wearing a pith helmet, holding a pistol and pointing it at an elephant. After the album was released, Snell sued Decca Records and the band over the image, saying it was "a source of constant embarrassment over being on the cover". Travers, with the direction of Decca, changed the image of Snell to that of a man without a pith helmet holding the pistol.

The collage of pictures of the band in the centre of the album's gate-fold was produced by projecting several images onto a single screen. According to Clarke, this method was a creative solution when it was discovered that the preferred method of printing a collage of several individual pictures would have added several weeks of production time.

== Release ==
In March 2006, the album was remastered into SACD format and repackaged with six extra tracks. In 2008, a remaster for standard audio CD was issued with the same bonus tracks.

== Promotion ==
The band promoted the album through tours of the United States and the United Kingdom. They appeared at both the Bath Festival of Blues and Progressive Music and the Isle of Wight Festival 1970; the Isle of Wight set was released in 2008 as Live at the Isle of Wight Festival 1970.

== Legacy ==
Pinder said: "All in all, it was one of the peaking albums for me. I listen to it now, and I can see why people are still discovering it. We never wanted to be a sock-it-to-me band. We all wanted to just express ourselves. The whole idea of individual growth and being able to transfer that into our music. Much of A Question of Balance did exactly that."

== Track listing ==
Side one
No.	Title	Writer(s)	Lead vocals	Length
1.	"Question"	Justin Hayward	Hayward	5:40
2.	"How Is It (We Are Here)"	Mike Pinder	Pinder	2:48
3.	"And the Tide Rushes In"	Ray Thomas	Thomas	2:57
4.	"Don't You Feel Small"	Graeme Edge	Hayward, Thomas, Pinder, Lodge; whisper by Edge	2:40
5.	"Tortoise and the Hare"	John Lodge	Lodge	3:23

Side two
No.	Title	Writer(s)	Lead vocals	Length
6.	"It's Up to You"	Hayward	Hayward	3:11
7.	"Minstrel's Song"	Lodge	Lodge	4:27
8.	"Dawning Is the Day"	Hayward	Hayward	4:22
9.	"Melancholy Man"	Pinder	Pinder	5:49
10.	"The Balance"	Edge, Thomas	Pinder (narration)	3:33
Total length:				38:41

2006 SACD expanded edition and 2008 remaster bonus tracks
No.	Title	Writer(s)	Note	Length
11.	"Mike's Number One"	Pinder		3:36
12.	"Question"	Hayward	Alternate version	6:08
13.	"Minstrel's Song"	Lodge	Original mix	4:35
14.	"It's Up To You"	Hayward	Original mix	3:19
15.	"Don't You Feel Small"	Edge	Original mix	3:02
16.	"Dawning Is The Day"	Hayward	Full original mix	4:36

== Personnel ==
=== The Moody Blues ===
- Justin Hayward – vocals, acoustic & electric guitars, mandolin
- John Lodge – vocals, bass
- Ray Thomas – vocals, flute, tambourine
- Graeme Edge – drums, percussion, whispered vocal on "Don't You Feel Small"
- Mike Pinder – vocals, Mellotron, Moog synthesizer, piano, harpsichord, maracas, acoustic guitar

=== Technical ===
- Producer - Tony Clarke
- Engineers - Derek Varnals, Adrian Martins, Robin Thompson
- Cover Painting - Phil Travers
- All Photos - David Rohl
- Photo Montage - Mike Goss, David Rohl

== Charts ==
Chart (1970–1971)	Peak position
Australian Albums (Kent Music Report)	2
Canada Top Albums/CDs (RPM)	3
Danish Albums (Hitlisten)	7
Dutch Albums (Album Top 100)	8
Finnish Albums (The Official Finnish Charts)	9
Italian Albums (Musica e Dischi)	7
Norwegian Albums (VG-lista)	5
UK Albums (Official Charts)	1
US Billboard 200	3

Chart (1975)	Peak position
Danish Albums (Hitlisten)	17

== Certifications ==
Region	Certification	Certified units/sales
Canada (Music Canada)	Platinum	100,000^{^}
United States (RIAA)	Platinum	1,000,000^{^}
^{^} Shipments figures based on certification alone.
