= Every Good Boy Deserves Favour (album) =

Studio album by the Moody Blues
- Released: 23 July 1971
- Recorded: November 1970 – March 1971
- Studios: Wessex, London
- Genre: Progressive rock
- Length: 40:05
- Label: Threshold
- Producer: Tony Clarke

The Moody Blues chronology
A Question of Balance (1970)	Every Good Boy Deserves Favour (1971)	Seventh Sojourn (1972)

Singles from Every Good Boy Deserves Favour
- 1. "The Story in Your Eyes" Released: August 1971

Professional ratings
Review scores
Source	Rating
Allmusic	4.5/5 stars
Rolling Stone	(average)
Uncut	2/5 stars

Every Good Boy Deserves Favour is the seventh album by the Moody Blues, released in 1971. The album reached No. 1 on the British album chart, in addition to a three-week stay at No. 2 in the United States, and produced one top-40 single, "The Story in Your Eyes".

== Background ==
The album is largely a continuation in style from its predecessor, with no grand concept or theme. Bassist John Lodge explains, "Our new album would become a continuation of what we had done on A Question of Balance. We thought if you get things right you should continue on that road." Guitarist Justin Hayward further reflects on the album: "I think that Every Good Boy Deserves Favour is a kind of a searching, seeking record. It was made at a time of tremendous success for us, and that brought on all of the feelings of guilt, inadequacy and self-doubt that accompany that kind of success. It's a bittersweet record that pointed the direction of the next album which was the full stop."

== Writing ==
The title is taken from the student mnemonic for the lines of the treble clef: E-G-B-D-F. These notes are heard on piano during "Procession" and the theme is carried out through the rest of the album.

The opening track "Procession" is the group's only song to be written by all five members. It was intended to describe the history of music from the beginning of time until the album's recording. The only three words heard in this track—"desolation", "creation", and "communication"—are similarly used (along with many other "-ation" words) in "One More Time to Live". Drummer Graeme Edge remembers, "We had nerve in those days! We decided that we could create a piece that would show the history of musical evolution. We began by making grunting sounds and hitting hollow logs, this evolved into both Eastern music and eventually Western music."

"The Story in Your Eyes" was chosen for a single release. Hayward remembers writing the song: "The song just sprung out of my acoustic guitar one day while I was at home. I was just playing my Martin D-28...and the first thing that came to me was the middle-eight section. And from there, the rest of the song came together. I deliberately saw it as a more harder-rocking song from the outset. Only a couple of weeks before entering the studio, I had done a version of it with Mike at his place, with just me playing the guitar and him working out the piano part for the outro. Mike then did eight or 12 tracks of Mellotron, bouncing from one machine to another. And it only sounded good when he had done it and multitracked it." The lyrics were inspired by a relationship, but also the personal dynamics of the band. He explains, "It's always about a love affair, isn't it? I wish I could tell you more, but some of that is private. Despite its personal nature, "The Story in Your Eyes" is also kind of about the band. 'We're part of the fire that is burning, and from the ashes we can build another day.' There's a kind of confession in it, as we were soon about to go through a rather awkward phase."

The track "Emily's Song" was written by John Lodge for his newborn daughter.

"Nice to Be Here" is a whimsical Ray Thomas song where he imagines witnessing a concert performed by woodland creatures on makeshift instruments. The song was inspired by Thomas' lifelong admiration of nature with additional inspiration from the children's books by Beatrix Potter. Thomas recalls, "I've loved fishing ever since I was a little kid. I used to camp out by a lake a week at a time fishing. At first all the wildlife buggers off but after you've been there for a few days they realise that you're not any threat to them. They run all over your feet, I've even had kingfishers landing on the end of my rod. So I got a great kick out of writing 'Lovely weather must climb a tree.' I was a little kid again. And I just went through a band really, 'Silver minnows were devising water ballets so surprising'." He remembers the session fondly: "The song was great fun to record. Particularly trying to get Justin to play a guitar solo using only one string, like the frog in the lyrics. He actually managed to get it down to two strings!"

The contemplative "You Can Never Go Home" was inspired by grief. Hayward remembers in a later interview, "I remember what I was going through emotionally then – I was losing people and there was a lot of grief around my life. It was a difficult time for me, those early years of the Moodies. It's worth remembering to value what there is now."

== Recording ==
Sessions ran from November 1970 to March 1971, with a break in December for an American tour where they played Carnegie Hall. The sessions were again overseen by producer Tony Clarke and engineer Derek Varnals. The bulk of the album was recorded at Wessex, London instead of their usual Decca studio in West Hampstead. Hayward explains the change in setting: "It was almost a kind of rebellion by us. It was really change for change's sake as we wondered if the grass would be greener recording elsewhere. We were also trying to come to terms with the fact that our music was no longer 'underground' but had taken on a life of its own and we were having to perform in large arenas in America. Our new material was almost apologetic in its approach at that time."

For "Procession", Graeme Edge uses a recently invented electronic drum kit, which Edge developed with Brian Groves of Sussex University. Its use likely represents the first use of an electronic drum kit on record. Edge describes the technology: "I had a control panel in front of me. There were pieces of rubber with silver paper on the back, with a coil that moved up and down inside a magnet which produced a signal. When it worked it was superb, but it was very sensitive to any surge or change in electricity. When I tried to use it on stage the whole kit would go bananas as soon as anyone turned stage lighting on and off. It was okay for studio use as if it went haywire you could turn it off and start all over again!" He continues, "This was before silicon chips, you see, and I was using transistors. I had something like five thousand transistors in there and it used to set up some really weird fields. Just about anything would set it off. It used to work great at home. And it worked great in rehearsal, but the first time we tried to use it on stage - every time we tried to use the spotlights - they'd set it off, so I just retired it." He reflects on his motivations for trying the new technology: "I was always conscious of the drum's ring being out of tune. So I wanted a drumkit that you could tune to the key of a song. That's why people started to tape cigarette packets to drums and all that—to eliminate that ring so it wouldn't mess with the guitars. And that kit was a dismal failure—but a heroic failure."

On "The Story in Your Eyes", Hayward plays acoustic guitar on the backing track, with electric guitar later overdubbed. He explains, "I first put the acoustic guitar down using the Martin D-28, with myself and Graeme Edge on drums, and then worked on it from there. I also double-tracked the acoustic. When it came time for the electric guitar part, I used a Cherry Red 1963 [Gibson] ES-335 that I've had since 1968. The electric guitar that opens the song — including feedback that's in tune to an A note — and goes all the way through the song is the ES-335 direct into the Normal channel of an AC30 Top Boost turned up full. In the solo and at the end, that's the ES-335 again through a Marshall Reverb-Fuzz Unit."

Hayward reflects on Mike Pinder's influence in arranging their songs and how he helped drive the rhythm when recording songs in the studio: "His contribution was also in the rhythm of the band, because if you listen to the early records, the main rhythm is held by a tambourine, which was always being played by Mike. Mike would never play piano or anything on the first track. We'd do drums, bass, guitar, and Mike on tambourine. And it was Mike who we would follow - all of us, even Graeme on drums, would follow Mike, and so his was always the tempo. You listen to the early records, you see how far up front the tambourine is, like in "The Story In Your Eyes". You listen, it's carried by a tambourine, it's so simple.""

In recording Mike Pinder's "My Song", the artist desired that his vocals sound like he was outside the world, looking down on it, like an astronaut on a spacewalk. To achieve the effect engineers Derek Varnals and David Baker constructed him a large carton to wear over his head. Varnals remembers, "I then filtered the signal to make it sound like a transmission from space. We were trying to create something serious, but everyone was laughing hysterically—everyone except Mike, who was the only person who couldn’t see what we were seeing: a quite Monty Python–like image of someone standing perfectly still with a box covering his head. It eventually ended up sounding a bit like Darth Vader, but this was several years before Star Wars was made."

== Album cover ==
The cover art created by artist Phil Travers was inspired by the work named Der Kristall (The Crystal) by German artist Sulamith Wülfing. It has been imitated by the leader of the dark progressive band Current 93, David Tibet, for Halo, a live album released in 2004.

== Release ==
The album was mixed and released in both stereo and quadraphonic. In April 2007, the album was remastered into SACD format and repackaged with the two extra tracks.

In 2008, a remaster for standard audio CD was issued with the same bonus tracks.

== Track listing ==
Side one
No.	Title	Writer(s)	Lead vocals	Length
1.	"Procession"	Graeme Edge, Justin Hayward, John Lodge, Mike Pinder, Ray Thomas	Edge, Hayward, Lodge, Pinder, Thomas (sung and spoken)	4:40
2.	"The Story in Your Eyes"	Hayward	Hayward	2:57
3.	"Our Guessing Game"	Thomas	Thomas	3:34
4.	"Emily's Song"	Lodge	Lodge	3:41
5.	"After You Came"	Edge	Thomas, Pinder, Lodge, Hayward	4:37

Side two
No.	Title	Writer(s)	Lead vocals	Length
6.	"One More Time to Live"	Lodge	Lodge	5:41
7.	"Nice to Be Here"	Thomas	Thomas	4:24
8.	"You Can Never Go Home"	Hayward	Hayward	4:14
9.	"My Song"	Pinder	Pinder	6:20
Total length:				40:05

2007 SACD expanded edition and 2008 remaster bonus tracks
No.	Title	Writer(s)	Length
10.	"The Story in Your Eyes" (original version)	Hayward	3:33
11.	"The Dreamer"	Hayward, Thomas	3:42

== Personnel ==
=== The Moody Blues ===
- Justin Hayward – vocals, guitars, sitar
- John Lodge – vocals, bass, cello
- Ray Thomas – vocals, flute, tambourine, oboe, woodwinds, harmonica
- Graeme Edge – drums, percussion, electronic drums and vocals on "Procession"
- Mike Pinder – vocals, Mellotron, harpsichord, Hammond organ, piano, celesta, Moog synthesizer, cello

=== Production ===
- Tony Clarke – producer
- Derek Varnals – recording engineer
- David Baker – assistant engineer
- Harry Fisher – cutting engineer
- Phil Travers – sleeve artist
- J. Randall Nelson – lyrics sheet photograph

== Charts ==
=== Weekly charts ===
Weekly chart performance for Every Good Boy Deserves Favour
Chart (1971–1972)	Peak position
Australian Albums (Kent Music Report)	5
Canada Top Albums/CDs (RPM)	2
Danish Albums (Hitlisten)	1
Dutch Albums (Album Top 100)	6
Finnish Albums (The Official Finnish Charts)	13
German Albums (Offizielle Top 100)	44
Italian Albums (Musica e Dischi)	8
Norwegian Albums (VG-lista)	5
UK Albums (Official Charts)	1
US Billboard 200	2

=== Year-end charts ===
Year-end chart performance for Every Good Boy Deserves Favour
Chart (1971)	Position
Dutch Albums (Album Top 100)	47

== Certifications ==
Region	Certification	Certified units/sales
Canada (Music Canada)	Platinum	100,000^{^}
United States (RIAA)	Gold	500,000^{^}
^{^} Shipments figures based on certification alone.
