= Procession (The Moody Blues song) =

Song by The Moody Blues

from the album Every Good Boy Deserves Favour
- Released: 23 July 1971
- Recorded: January–March 1971
- Length: 4:40
- Label: Threshold
- Songwriter(s): Justin Hayward; John Lodge; Mike Pinder; Ray Thomas; Graeme Edge
- Producer(s): Tony Clarke

Official audio
- "Procession" on YouTube

"Procession" is a 1971 song by the Moody Blues and is the opening track of their album Every Good Boy Deserves Favour. It is the only song to have been co-written by all five members of the band.

"Procession" is one of the first commercial songs to make use of electronic drums. The instrument in question was a custom drum synth developed by Moody Blues drummer Graeme Edge and Sussex University professor Brian Groves.

"Procession" is an instrumental song, with the exception of three words (two spoken and one sung): "desolation", "creation", and "communication". These words, as well as other words ending in "-ation", also appear on the album track "One More Time to Live."

A section of "Procession" was sampled by hip-hop musicians J Dilla and Madlib on the 2003 Jaylib album Champion Sound; the sample appears on the opening track "L.A. to Detroit."

== Personnel ==
- Justin Hayward ― electric and acoustic guitars, sitar, vocals
- John Lodge ― bass, vocals
- Mike Pinder ― Moog synthesizer, piano, harpsichord, Hammond organ, Mellotron, vocals
- Ray Thomas ― flute, vocals
- Graeme Edge ― electronic and acoustic drums, percussion, vocals
