= The Promise (Mike Pinder album) =

Studio album by Mike Pinder
- Released: 11 April 1976
- Recorded: 1975–1976
- Studios: Indigo Ranch Studios, Malibu, California
- Genre: Rock
- Length: 31:00
- Label: LP: Threshold THS 18/CD: Threshold 820776
- Producer: Mike Pinder in association with Robert Margouleff

Mike Pinder chronology
The Promise (1976)	Among the Stars (1994)

The Promise is a 1976 solo album by Mike Pinder of The Moody Blues, recorded during their sabbatical from late 1972 to 1977.

It was reissued on CD in August 1989.

== Track listing ==
All tracks composed by Mike Pinder except where noted.

=== Side 1 ===
1. "Free As a Dove" – 4:10
2. "You'll Make It Through" (Mike Pinder, Jim Dillon) – 3:52
3. "I Only Want to Love You" – 3:25
4. "Someone to Believe In" – 3:09

=== Side 2 ===
1. "Carry On" – 4:16
2. "Air" – 2:20
3. "Message" – 2:46
4. "The Seed" – 1:25
5. "The Promise" – 6:02

The album was recorded in Pinder's studio at Malibu, Indigo Ranch.

There was a 1996 CD reissue of this album that had 2-bonus tracks:

1. "One Step Into the Light" 5:44
2. "Island to Island" 3:14

== Personnel ==
- Mike Pinder – synthesizer, acoustic guitar, 12 string guitar, piano, mellotron, vocals
- Fred Beckmeier – bass guitar
- Steve Beckmeier – acoustic guitar, electric guitar
- Bill Berg – drums, percussion
- Joel DiBartolo – double bass
- Jim Dillon – acoustic guitar, electric guitar, slide guitar, sitar, vocals
- Jimmy Johnson – bass guitar
- Bobby Keys – tenor saxophone
- Jeannie King – vocals
- Steve Madalo – trumpet
- Susann McDonald – harp
- Dean Olch – flute, shakuhachi
- Tom Peterson – flute, tenor saxophone
- William D. "Smitty" Smith – organ
- Mike Azevedo - congas
- Julia Tillman Waters – vocals
- Maxine Willard Waters – vocals

== Charts ==
Chart (1976)	Peak position
US Billboard 200	133
