= Among the Stars =

Studio album by Mike Pinder
- Released: 1994
- Studio: Indigo Ranch Studios, Malibu, California
- Genre: Rock
- Length: 41:06
- Label: One Step Records
- Producer: Mike Pinder

Mike Pinder chronology
The Promise (1976)	Among the Stars (1994)

Among the Stars is a 1994 solo album by Mike Pinder of the Moody Blues. It was reissued on CD in August 2013.

== Track listing ==
All tracks composed by Mike Pinder

1. "The Power of Love (Can Survive)"
2. "You Can't Take Love Away"
3. "The Best Things in Life"
4. "Hurry On Home"
5. "When You're Sleeping"
6. "Fantasy Flight"
7. "Among the Stars"
8. "Upside Down"
9. "Waters Beneath the Bridge"
10. "The World Today"

The 2013 CD reissue of the album has three bonus tracks:

1. "If She Came Back"
2. "Waves Crash"
3. "Empty Streets"

== Personnel ==
- Mike Pinder - synthesizer, acoustic guitar, 12-string guitar, piano, Mellotron, vocals
- Michael Sembello, Roland Bautista, Tony Berg - guitar
- Alphonso Johnson, Dan Pinder, Fred Beckmeier, Matt Pinder - bass
- Alan Pasqua - piano, synthesizer
- Adam Sanders, Chester Thompson, Michael Beono, Sam Plersky - drums
- Steve Forman - percussion
- David Woodford - saxophone
- Abe Most - clarinet
- Osamu Kitajima - koto
- Eddie Ulibarri, Joe Bithorn, Joey Curatolo, Samsara, The Valentine Brothers - backing vocals

Technical

- Tony Berg - associate producer
- Richard Kaplan - engineer
