= Tony Clarke (music producer) =

English record producer and guitarist (1941–2010)

Anthony Ralph Clarke (21 August 1941 – 4 January 2010) was an English rock music record producer and guitarist. Born in Coventry, he is best known for producing The Moody Blues from 1966 to 1978.

== Biography ==
Clarke was born in Coventry. He remembered the city as bombed-out from the effects of the Blitz.

Clarke played bass guitar in skiffle bands in the middle and late 1950s, and continued playing in rock bands into the early 1960s. Alongside this, he found work as a session musician for Decca Records, and in 1963 he was hired by the label as a promoter. In 1964 he transferred to the production department, working under Dick Rowe.

Most of his early work was spent on clerical and discographical tasks, though he also worked as a songwriter; his tune "Our Song" was recorded by Malcolm Roberts (who had a hit with it in South America) and Jack Jones. He produced his first single with Pinkerton's Assorted Colours; that song, "Mirror, Mirror", became a #9 hit on the UK Singles Chart. He wrote "The Guy Who Made Her A Star" for The Equals, featured on the B-side of the band's 1968 hit single, "Laurel And Hardy".

He was assigned to work with The Moody Blues starting in 1966, when the group was fading after its first major hit, "Go Now". He worked with them on the single "Fly Me High", and following this was put in charge of a project to create a rock version, with the Moody Blues, of Antonín Dvořák's New World Symphony. After this idea was shelved, he produced what became their 1967 symphonic rock album Days of Future Passed. Like the members of the Moody Blues themselves, Clarke had received no formal training in classical music as a youngster. He worked with them closely over the course of their next six albums, helping them develop a complex sound which, among other things, involved copious use of the mellotron (and earning the nickname "the Sixth Moody" from fans). When the Moody Blues set up their own label, Threshold Records, Clarke attempted to have them sign King Crimson, although the deal never came to fruition.

Aside from the Moody Blues, Clarke also worked with Providence and on the album Blue Jays, by Moody Blues members Justin Hayward and John Lodge. He also produced the Four Tops on two Mike Pinder-penned songs - "(A) Simple Game" and "So Deep Within You" - previously recorded by the Moodies. Each initially appeared as the A-side of a Four Tops UK 7" single in 1971 and 1973 respectively, and in other territories as well; both productions were on a 4-track 7" ep release Simple Game from Australia in 1972.

After the Moody Blues went on hiatus in the middle of the 1970s, he worked to have them reunite, and produced their 1978 comeback album, Octave; however, he elected not to continue working with them after this album. In 1981 Moody Blues' guitarist Justin Hayward said of Clarke's departure:

I'm still not sure why he left. I know he had a lot of personal problems. We parted company with him and I haven't seen him since. None of us has seen him again. His lawyer writes us letters occasionally but that's about it.

Subsequently he produced for Clannad, Rick Wakeman, and Nicky Hopkins, among others. He talked extensively about his career in Nick Awde's 2008 study Mellotron, subtitled The Machine and the Musicians That Revolutionised Rock.

== As a producer ==
- The Moody Blues:
  - Days of Future Passed (1967)
  - In Search of the Lost Chord (1968)
  - On the Threshold of a Dream (1969)
  - To Our Children's Children's Children (1969)
  - A Question of Balance (1970)
  - Every Good Boy Deserves Favour (1971)
  - Seventh Sojourn (1972)
  - Octave (1978)
- Justin Hayward and John Lodge: Blue Jays (1975)
- Justin Hayward: Songwriter (1977)
- John Lodge: Natural Avenue (1977)
- Clannad: Legend (1984)
- Rick Wakeman:
- Nicky Hopkins:
