= In Search of the Lost Chord =

1968 studio album by The Moody Blues

Studio album by the Moody Blues
- Released: 26 July 1968
- Recorded: January–June 1968
- Studios: Decca, London
- Genre: Progressive rock
- Length: 42:07
- Label: Deram
- Producer: Tony Clarke

The Moody Blues chronology
Days of Future Passed (1967)	In Search of the Lost Chord (1968)	On the Threshold of a Dream (1969)

Singles from In Search of the Lost Chord
- 1. "Voices in the Sky" Released: 28 June 1968; 2. "Ride My See-Saw" Released: 12 October 1968

In Search of the Lost Chord is the third album by the Moody Blues, released in July 1968 on the Deram label.

== Background ==
The success of the band's previous record, Days of Future Passed, allowed the group additional studio time and creative flexibility in crafting a follow-up album. At the time, keyboardist Mike Pinder told the Melody Maker, "Albums give us a chance to experiment with new ideas. And buyers realize they offer more than just music to dance to. They can sit down and listen – get away on a trip of musical exploration." Guitarist Justin Hayward recalled that In Search of the Lost Chord "was when I feel we found our soul and direction. It was when everything gelled musically."

== Writing ==
Like its predecessor, In Search of the Lost Chord features a conceptual theme. The songs of In Search of the Lost Chord form a loose concept around a theme of quest and discovery, including both world exploration and inner self-realization. Mike Pinder explained, "The Moodies were really the first rock band to do conceptual albums and to work with a symphony orchestra. Because of that, I realized that so many of my ideas were linked-up to this whole area of conceptual thinking and of communicating ideas to people by asking questions musically and through the lyrics."

The album takes inspiration from the spirit of inner exploration that characterized the psychedelic era. Justin Hayward acknowledged the influence of psychedelic drugs on the band's creative process: "Oh, we all dabbled in all sorts of things. Well, all of us apart from John. He never participated. Usually, they were the more psychedelic type of drugs. I must admit we always had a great time on acid. And those trips inspired a lot of our music at the time." He commented, "I think we were able to take those experiences and hopefully pass them on. That’s the only credit, I think, we can take." Keyboardist Mike Pinder said, "Listening to music, you enjoy it most when you're in a meditative state and I think the drug influence was able to put you into that state instantly."

Hayward elaborated on the band's spirit of curiosity and quest for knowledge: "Myself, Pinder and Ray were dabbling in everything, trying to guzzle as much spiritual and psychedelic information as we could possibly get. We were racing toward it all the time - reading every book, investigating every kind of religion, having all sorts of psychedelic experiences. We met Timothy Leary in 1968 on our first tour of America, me Mike and Ray stayed with him on his ranch for a week or so, and we had a wonderful time. We went through a lot of religious experiences together, we tended to read the same books. I remember us all reading the Bhagavad Gita, and The Tibetan Book of The Dead, and doing all of these things together. So what we were saying was sincere, we weren't just picking up bits of information and using them in songs. We were actually living this stuff at the time, I suppose like many other people, but we took it a lot more seriously than most other musicians, and we were able to put it into music in a more accessible way than some of the other musicians who were really seriously into it, but who were inaccessible in their music."

Pinder reflects on the album's themes in a 1976 radio interview: "We carefully considered every word of the lyrics, to make sure it was balanced, that it didn't make statements, as in 'this is the answer'. We're not giving the answers, for it's the asking of the question that brings about the answer, and the answer is always an intelligible thing. I want to try to get across to people that these are just experiences that people are having, put down, and shared on records. I buy records that I'm getting something out of other than just entertainment. I'm hoping to hear somebody say something that I want to hear, and know that it's coming from a person I can trust and believe that they've had that experience."

In Search of the Lost Chord opens with a poem by Graeme Edge, which was spoken by Edge himself (rather than Mike Pinder as in most cases). Its words describe how a sensory experience can serve as the impetus for the beginning of a journey.

The spoken introduction segues into the rock song "Ride My See-Saw", the album's lead single. John Lodge explains the inspiration for its lyrics: "That song was about the freedom which I felt I'd received, both personally and as part of The Moody Blues." He said, "The song was about leaving school and going out into the world and finding out it wasn't what you thought it was and it isn't what you were taught in school. It is actually much bigger than that. 'Ride My See-Saw' was about riding my life and seeing where we go with this thing. I am still doing that now." Justin Hayward remembered, "My memory of it was like a jam session in the studio. We kinda got stuck with it, but it was a great. We had Graeme doing that di-da-da, di-da-da on the snare drum — that's how it started –and the guitar riff. But we had no song, and then John came back with some lyrics and the bones of the song. We recorded that sometime after we'd recorded the backing track." Lodge said, "I wrote that song on bass. For that time, there are some really nice chord changes, the minors and the majors. I wanted the middle to be only harmonies and it was. We had these soaring three and four parts going around. We were trying to find a way to get the rhythm really right, as it has a driving rhythm." Guitarist Hayward cited the solo as perhaps his favorite in the band's catalog: "That guitar was a Telecaster I had when I was a kid. I remember playing the whole track from start to finish, just kind of making it up as I went along, and I got to the end of it, and everyone said, 'Great!' 'Fantastic!' And I said, 'It's a bit weird. It's a bit out of time,' and they said, 'No, no. We loved it.' All my other solos were carefully constructed and thought out, but that is my favorite."

The author of "Dr. Livingstone, I Presume", Ray Thomas, described the song as "a bit of fun amidst all the seriousness of the other songs on the album." The verses recount the journeys of David Livingstone, Robert Falcon Scott and Christopher Columbus, and question whether each explorer found fulfillment in their respective searches.

"House of Four Doors" continues the theme of discovery, and serves as an introduction to "Legend of a Mind". Lodge remembered, "I wrote a song once called 'House of Four Doors', and that really is about an approach to life that I think everyone can have. Open a door, see where it takes you. It might not be where you want to go, but at least you're going along, and you don't know where it'll go eventually." He said, "When you open a door, you never know what's gonna come in. You've got to be positive enough to open the door. If you don't know what door you're opening, you're never gonna find out." Bassist Lodge plays cello on the track, tuned as a bass guitar. He remembered, "I played the cello on that track, and tuned it the same way as a bass guitar. I never realized that a cello wasn't actually tuned that way at all, but we got the desired effect!"

"Legend of a Mind", the first song written for the album, dates from the Days of Future Passed sessions. It was inspired by the LSD advocacy of Timothy Leary. Hayward remembered, "Some of us in the band — and this was 1966, '67 — were going through our own psychic experiences, as a lot of musicians were at the time, probably being led by the Beatles. We were reading a lot of underground press and reading about Tim Leary, so we put him in... The song is a very tongue-in-cheek version, a very cheeky English version of what we thought things would be like in San Francisco in the 'flower power' days... It was tongue in cheek, but with a background of serious meaning. It did mean something to us. We were using a lot of phrases of the time, extracts from the Tibetan Book of the Dead, talking about the astral plane and so forth, and it's a reflection of that."

The songs on the second side of the album deal with more personal themes of self-discovery. "Voices in the Sky" explores spirituality while "The Best Way to Travel" addresses psychedelic imagination. The lyrics of the latter song question if experience is just "light passing by on a screen", suggesting that if our perception of life is really just an illusion, then meditation can help us understand the true nature of existence.

"Visions of Paradise" and "The Actor" explore love and reflective introspection. In an interview, Hayward remembered the context that inspired the lyrics to "The Actor": "Late at night, the road outside in Bayswater, quiet for a while, all alone in the world (for a bit), being in love but struggling with relationships."

The album concludes with "Om", featuring a spoken-word introduction by Edge titled "The Word". The poem features the line "Between the eyes and ears there lie the sounds of color and the light of a sigh". Edge explained, "You can listen to your favorite piece of music fifty times and still get something from it. But the best movie you've ever seen, you get ten, eleven, and it's done. Because music is hot and the visual is sort of cold. Music is tempo, form, and pitch. Through the eyes, you've got color, perspective, and form. So you get through the eyes the same way you get through the ears, with really creative vibrations."

"Om" is an ode to transcendentalism and the use of mantras in meditation. The album's liner notes provide an explanation of the concept of a mantra, in case the group's audience at the time was unfamiliar:

To anyone who has practiced meditation or Yoga: the word MANTRA is familiar as a word of power concentrated upon in meditation. The most important word of power in the Hindu scriptures is the word OM, which pronounced AUM means 'God,' 'All,' 'Being,' 'The answer.' Thought or intentness on its meaning will cause the exclusion of all other thoughts, ultimately bringing about the state of mind to which the meditator aspires.

== Recording ==
"Legend of a Mind" was recorded January 13, 1968. The remainder of the album was recorded between May and June. Like its predecessor, the album was recorded at Studio One at Decca Studios in West Hampstead with producer Tony Clarke and engineer Derek Varnals. The album was largely recorded using 4-track technology, though Decca's new 8-track recording system was installed during the sessions. "Visions of Paradise" was the last song recorded to 4 tracks, on 4 June. Vocal overdubs were made on 5 and 6 June to "Ride My See-Saw" and "Om" using the new system. The final two tracks recorded for the album, "The Word" and "Departure", were both recorded using the new 8-track console on 12 June.

The surprise success of Days of Future Passed gave the group new clout with their record label and artistic freedom in the studio. Hayward remembered, "We were also fortunate to be with a record company, Decca, who were old music men, a lot of the time making radar systems, who were technically superb with a brilliant studio and staff in West Hampstead. Better than EMI in my opinion. After Days, which was a lucky accident, Sir Edward Lewis came to us and said, I don't know what you boys are doing, but it's great. Whenever you want the studio just make a booking and it was a dream to young musicians like us. The sleeves, just do what you want."

One area where the group capitalized on the success of Days of Future Passed was by continuing to employ creative song structures that didn't fit the typical mold of the time. Lodge explained, "We wanted no boundaries within our music. Up until then most songs came along in 2:59 seconds and started at one tempo and finished in the same tempo. Basically, a verse and then a chorus and then a bridge and the chorus. We wanted to break that mold and if it took six minutes to actually say what we wanted to in a song and four or five different tempos then we would do that. 'Legend Of A Mind: Timothy Leary' is a great example of that. Whatever it took to convey the song. 'Tuesday Afternoon,' you know, two different tempos. All is important to try and push the boundaries of what we thought of as songwriting. Each song went into the next song, and we'd be very careful about what key each song was in and what tempo and what mode each song sort of portrayed. It was very important to have things that linked but were different. You couldn't have two things the same because they never linked if they were the same."

Whereas the London Festival Orchestra had supplemented the group on Days of Future Passed, on In Search of the Lost Chord, the Moody Blues played all instruments themselves, a total of thirty-three different instruments. Lodge remembered, "Although we'd used an orchestra on the previous album we all felt that we should be self-reliant with our next work. We had the self-sufficient approach to our recording sessions. If we wanted to use a particular instrument on a track, one of us would figure out how to play it. We had a great deal of confidence in our own abilities." The group also enhanced their sound with vocal harmonies. Lodge explained, "We realized that we all had different voice sounds; we had baritone, two tenors and almost soprano. What sound we couldn't reproduce on stage with orchestration we realized we could do with vocals, so we could take over a lot of the things and do them with the harmonies. They were fantastic. I grew up with The Everly Brothers and their harmonies. The great thing about The Everly Brothers' harmonies, as opposed to other peoples' harmonies, is that the harmony was also the lead, which is what we also did. The harmony wasn't adding to the lead vocal; it was both lead vocals working together. It wasn't just embellishing, it was adding another dimension. Just like an orchestra or any musical band. You can take any part that the orchestra is playing and have it stand up on its own. You can make the harmony the lead line, like a saxophone section."

Lodge further reflected on the influence of classical music on the group's compositions: "I grew up in Birmingham and my school used to have a quiet period where they put a classical record on in the afternoon and we would listen to it. Birmingham has one of the best classical orchestras in the world. I was eight or nine at the time and I never really thought about what I was listening to. Subconsciously, though, the harmonies of orchestral music were going into my head because when I started writing music that's what came to the forefront. I always understood what the different parts were and what different instruments and the orchestra were doing. I could hear it in my head." He said, "And then when we started together in '66, there were four of us that sang and I realized that the harmonies we could make were only really orchestral harmonies. And it developed from there. Of course we had Ray Thomas on flute, so that gave us the woodwinds and then for the harmonies we found this Mellotron that was a string player. So with harmonies and strings and flute, it became orchestral in a way, but with a driving force based in drums and electric guitar."

"Visions of Paradise" and "Om" feature Indian instrumentation, including sitar and tabla. Hayward was influenced to explore the sitar by George Harrison. He remembers, "There was, in the upper Tottenham Court Road, a shop that I'd been past, that I'd walked past that had those tablas and sitars. I'm not sure anybody was actually paying attention to it until George drew our attention to it. And then suddenly, we were allowed to explore it. I think George, in a way, gave us permission. I don't mean he phoned up and said, 'You have my permission.' But because he had just been there and it was like, 'Oh, that's so interesting that you have to find out.' I think most guitar players explore every kind of string instrument that they can get. As soon as I had some money, I was looking into lutes and then I bought myself a double bass, which I played on quite a few Moodies records, a big standup double bass. Probably still in the studio now by the national opera. So I went up there into that shop with Mike one day, and we sat down and I played the sitar, and he played the tambora, which I think is the name for that resonating instrument. And we thought, 'Oh, this is absolutely brilliant.' So we came away with a lot of stuff, and it was a joy to use it on an album."

In the album's liner notes, producer Tony Clarke poetically describes the setting of the album's recording sessions, and the large variety of instruments employed:

It's as dark as a tomb!, shadows appear from nowhere, great long arms reach upward into the gloom, and sinister coiled shapes lurk in every corner – even the walls seem to hold their breath. High up near the ceiling a soft light casts an eerie glow on upturned faces and all around, strange sounding music.

Suddenly a voice cries out "Great!...Come and have a listen!"

Yes, a recording studio can be a very strange place at 4-30 a.m., especially if it has been invaded by the Moody Blues.

The studio floor resembles a museum for musical instruments, since in this album every single note, beat, or word is performed by the Moodies themselves. Their versatility never ceases to amaze me from album to album, in fact to me they will always be the smallest symphony orchestra in the world.

With the album, the group aspired to make the most of both the broad range of instrumentation and Decca's stereo recording technology. John Lodge remembers: "Once we fully understood what stereo was after listening to what other people did with it, we decided we wanted to have a real panorama for In Search of the Lost Chord where the music would come across as a complete picture. Where would the tambourine be? Where would the acoustic guitar be? Should it be in the front or in the back, and should we put a bit of echo on it so it disappears away? We worked really hard with that stereo mix to give you a really full experience of sound as if a satellite were spinning around your head."

"The Best Way to Travel" makes use of newly installed pan pots on Decca Studios' custom-built four-track recording console. The panning gives the illusion that the sound moves around the listener.

Mike Pinder remembered the sessions' spirit of innovation: "Tony Clarke, Derek Varnals, and I were always trying to create new and innovative sounds. A good example of my signature Mellotron swoops are in Ray Thomas' song, 'Legend of a Mind'. I used the speed control on my 'Tron to create the swoops, and we would take advantage of the stereo effects to make the Mellotron sound and the movement come from one side to the other side, i.e., left-right, and right-left. And I would use the reverb to make it come forward and back in the track as well. The listener would get an almost-3D sound that was unique for that time. Derek always did a wonderful job. He was innovative and talented. He and Tony Clarke were adept at driving the ship. We were all very committed to our music and it was an adventure. Lots of fun and laughs as well. Everyone worked very hard. We had creative freedom, and we were fortunate to be allowed to try new things. It was our musical wonderland."

Lodge remembered the sessions fondly: "It was a really exciting time, and the studio was a great place to create. In those days, you didn't really have huge multi-tracking available. Days Of Future Passed was all four-track track. In Search Of The Lost Chord was all four-track except for 'Ride My See-Saw', when we had an eight-track machine turn up, and we used that. The recording process went pretty quick in those days. You could get in the studio, and you could all sit together, work out a song, and record it. It was a great time being on the road and touring, and we couldn't wait to be back in the studio to record a new album."

== Album cover ==
The album cover features artwork by Phil Travers, who would design the next several album covers for the group. Travers recounted: "I spent two years at Decca, working on album sleeves, then got a job in a design office down in Wimbledon. I was then contacted by someone I knew at Decca who said the Moody Blues manager liked an illustration of mine and wanted me to meet the band to discuss doing the sleeve for their new album. I met the Moodies in a London pub, and we worked out the details of the commission. The band wanted me primarily to illustrate the concept of meditation. This was not something that I had much personal experience of and so my initial thoughts about such an ethereal subject were, unfortunately, insubstantial. I wasn't producing any cohesive visual ideas, with this lack of ideas evident in my first rough designs. While I was listening to the music, the concept for the cover was actually given to me in some sort of subliminal way. The recording and mixing area of the studio where I was sitting was separated from the area where the band would play by a large glass window and in this glass I could see several images of myself – one above the other – almost as if I was ascending up into space. After that, everything just fell into place." He said, "I thought 'I've got to be more practical and logical in my approach.' Once I started thinking like this, things began to fall into place and I started to break the problem down into some sort of visual code. I remember on the final pencil rough I showed the band, instead of the skull I had a big padlock and chain which represented the physical ties we all have. They suggested the skull which I think said a similar thing but it was a better image."

== Release ==
Professional ratings
Review scores
Source	Rating
AllMusic	3/5 stars
Music-News	5/5 stars
Rolling Stone	(mixed)
Sputnikmusic	4/5

In Search of the Lost Chord was released on 26 July 1968. It peaked at number 5 in the UK Albums Chart and reached number 23 on the Billboard 200. Of the two singles from the album, "Ride My See-Saw" reached no. 42 in the UK Singles Chart and no. 61 on the US Billboard chart, while "Voices in the Sky" reached no. 27 in the UK but failed to chart in the US.

In Search of the Lost Chord was remastered into SACD in March 2006 and repackaged into a 2-CD Deluxe Edition. Although the other Moody Blues albums released in Deluxe Editions in 2006 featured their original quadrophonic mix (encoded as 5.1 surround sound), In Search of the Lost Chord had never been released in this format, and a new mix was not released until 2018 when a 5.1 mix was released as part of the 50th anniversary box set. In 2008, a remaster for single standard audio CD was issued with the nine bonus tracks. The re-release corrects quality concerns with the initial compact disc editions of the album. Justin Hayward explained,

There were a couple of things I knew they'd rushed into the digital domain in the early '80s, and quite badly. I really noticed it on In Search of the Lost Chord with Graeme Edge's ride cymbal. At first, I had just assumed it hadn't been recorded very well until I went back to the original masters and listened to it again. And then I thought, 'No, it's beautiful.' I realized we'd spent almost 30 years with a digital version that just wasn't very good, in the rush to get it into that format.

In November 2018, the album was reissued as a five-disc In Search of the Lost Chord - 50th Anniversary Box Deluxe Edition set.

== Promotion ==
To promote the album, the group continued to play concerts throughout the United Kingdom. In August, the group traveled to Prague at the invitation of the government of Alexander Dubček to play as one of the first western rock groups in communist Czechoslovakia. Prior to performing, the group had to be escorted out of the country upon the Soviet Invasion of the country. Lodge remembered,

It was a time of social change and upheaval, but it was during the era when Alexander Dubcek was in power, and everything had become a lot more relaxed. You heard rock 'n' roll music at the airport, and it didn't feel you were in an Iron Curtain country at all. So we went and did the gig, came back to the hotel and the manager said he wanted an urgent word with us. He explained that the Russians had invaded the city and had taken over the hotel and we had to move. 'Hang on,' we said. 'We were here first and we've given you the Thomas Cook vouchers to pay for our rooms, we're not going anywhere!' But we soon came to our senses, and moved out. Eventually, the only way we could get out of the country was to sneak onto a Pakistan Airlines Red Crescent flight, which is like being on a Red Cross mission. We arrived in the country as rock stars and left in the back of a Red Crescent emergency aid plane – that was a reality check.

In October, they embarked on their first American tour. Concert promoter Bill Graham invited them to play dates at both the Fillmore and the Fillmore East. Lodge recounted, "In '68 we were invited by Bill Graham to play two gigs in the States. The venues were quite far from each other and the gigs were 10 weeks apart so we worked our way across the U.S. and gigged with bands like Canned Heat, Jefferson Airplane and Poco." Hayward said, "We were very lucky that Bill Graham offered us those two gigs at the Fillmore East and the Fillmore West. And then we had an agent that picked us up a lot of psychedelic club gigs and then we got the tour with Canned Heat. They showed us America...on a school bus (laughs) but we still saw it. We went south to north, from the bottom up to Canada." Lodge said, "It was the most amazing experience. I don't think anyone will ever be able to experience that again because America in the 60s was so different from anywhere else in the world. The cars were enormous, the freeways were enormous, the buildings were enormous, and the McDonald's were enormous too! It was an incredible time musically because we went to the Fillmore East, the Fillmore West, and The Shrine in Los Angeles. So, we're in a different place altogether. It was wonderful to see all these bands playing. I'd go around everywhere looking at bands, enjoying the music, seeing people like Canned Heat. It was a remarkable time." Hayward recounted the lasting impact their first American tour had on the band's success: "We're big in the industrial, working-class parts of America. Funnily enough it's all the places that we came to when we opened for Canned Heat in '68. They were great to us, but their audience was all of these kind of places, like the Midwest, and that's been our territory ever since. And I'm very pleased, because there is a genuine love of the music."

== Legacy ==
In the Q and Mojo Classic Special Edition Pink Floyd & The Story of Prog Rock, the album was placed at number 37 in its list of "40 Cosmic Rock Albums".

== Track listing ==
Side One
No.	Title	Writer(s)	Lead vocals	Length
1.	"Departure"	Edge	Edge (narration)	0:44
2.	"Ride My See-Saw"	Lodge	Lodge, Thomas, Hayward, Pinder	3:38
3.	"Dr. Livingstone, I Presume"	Thomas	Thomas	2:58
4.	"House of Four Doors"	Lodge	Lodge	4:13
5.	"Legend of a Mind"	Thomas	Thomas	6:37
6.	"House of Four Doors (Part 2)"	Lodge	Lodge	1:42

Side Two
No.	Title	Writer(s)		Length
1.	"Voices in the Sky"	Hayward	Hayward	3:30
2.	"The Best Way to Travel"	Pinder	Pinder	3:12
3.	"Visions of Paradise"	Hayward, Thomas	Hayward	4:15
4.	"The Actor"	Hayward	Hayward	4:39
5.	"The Word"	Edge	Pinder (narration)	0:49
6.	"Om"	Pinder	Pinder, Thomas	5:47

== Personnel ==
=== The Moody Blues ===
- Justin Hayward – twelve string guitar, acoustic guitar, electric guitar, sitar, tablas, piano, Mellotron, bass guitar, harpsichord, percussion, vocals
- Mike Pinder – Mellotrons, piano, harpsichord, cello, acoustic guitar, bass guitar, Auto-Harp, vocals
- John Lodge – bass guitar, cello, tambourine, snare drum, acoustic guitar, vocals
- Ray Thomas – 'C' flute, alto flute, soprano saxophone, vocals
- Graeme Edge – drums, timpani, tambourine, tablas, piano, spoken word

=== Technical ===
- Tony Clarke – liner notes, production
- Derek Varnals – engineer
- Adrian Martins – assistant engineer
- Phil Travers – cover design, cover painting

== Charts ==
Chart (1968–1970)	Peak position
Canada Top Albums/CDs (RPM)	37
French Albums (SNEP)	6
German Albums (Offizielle Top 100)	30
UK Albums (Official Charts)	5
US Billboard 200	23

== Certifications ==
Region	Certification	Certified units/sales
Canada (Music Canada)	Platinum	100,000^{^}
United Kingdom (BPI) release of 2018	Silver	60,000^{‡}
United States (RIAA)	Gold	500,000^{^}
^{^} Shipments figures based on certification alone.^{‡} Sales+streaming figures based on certification alone.
