= Ray Thomas =

British musician (1941–2018)

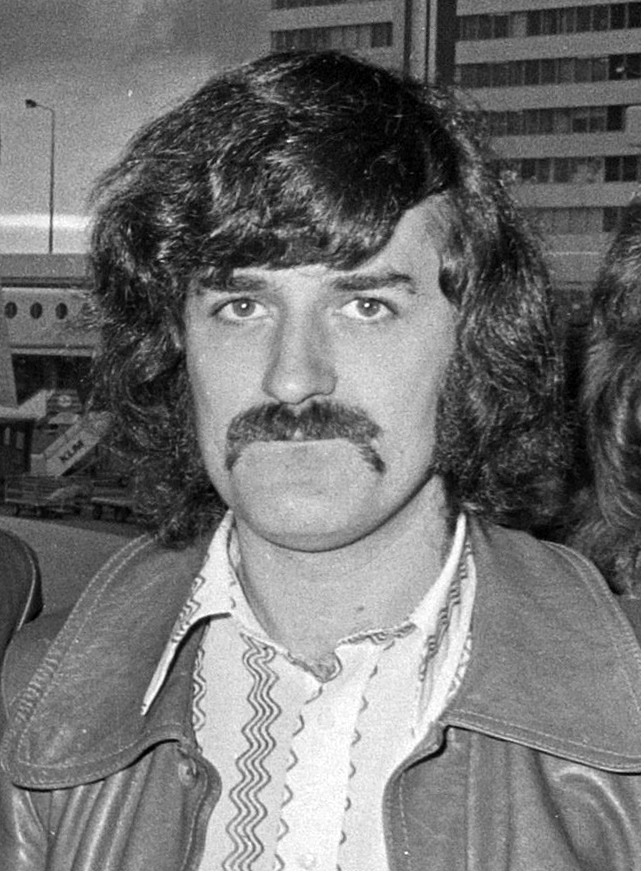
- Thomas in 1970
- Born: Raymond Thomas; 29 December 1941; Stourport-on-Severn, Worcestershire, England
- Died: 4 January 2018 (aged 76); Cobham, Surrey, England
- Occupations: Musician; singer; songwriter
- Musical career
- Genres: Progressive rock; psychedelic rock; symphonic rock; R&B; British folk rock; soft rock
- Instruments: Vocals; flute; harmonica
- Years active: 1960–2018
- Labels: Decca; Deram; Threshold; Polydor; Universal

Raymond Thomas (29 December 1941 – 4 January 2018) was an English musician, singer and songwriter. He was best known as a founding member of the English progressive rock band the Moody Blues. His flute solo on the band's 1967 hit single "Nights in White Satin" is regarded as one of progressive rock's defining moments. In 2018, he was posthumously inducted into the Rock and Roll Hall of Fame as a member of the Moody Blues.

== Career ==
=== Early years ===
Thomas was born at an emergency maternity unit set up during the Second World War in Lickhill Manor, Stourport-on-Severn, Worcestershire, England. His father's family was from the southwest corner of Wales. His grandfather was a Welsh miner and went on to become a carpenter and a wood-carver, at one stage working on the church where Thomas later got married. His father taught him at the age of nine to play harmonica, and this sparked his interest in music. He joined the school choir a year later. He quit schooling at the age of 14, and briefly left music to work as a toolmaking trainee at Lemarks. By the age of 16 he had embarked on a search for a music band, and within two years had left his trade to pursue a career in music.

In the 1960s, Thomas joined the Birmingham Youth Choir then began singing with various Birmingham blues and soul groups including The Saints and Sinners and The Ramblers. He was inspired to learn the flute from a grandfather who played the instrument. Again taking up the harmonica, he started a band, El Riot and the Rebels, with bassist John Lodge. After a couple of years their friend Mike Pinder joined as keyboardist. On Easter Monday 1963 the band opened for the Beatles at the Bridge Hotel, Tenbury Wells. Thomas and Pinder were later in a band called Krew Cats, formed in 1963, who played in Hamburg and other places in northern Germany.

=== The Moody Blues ===
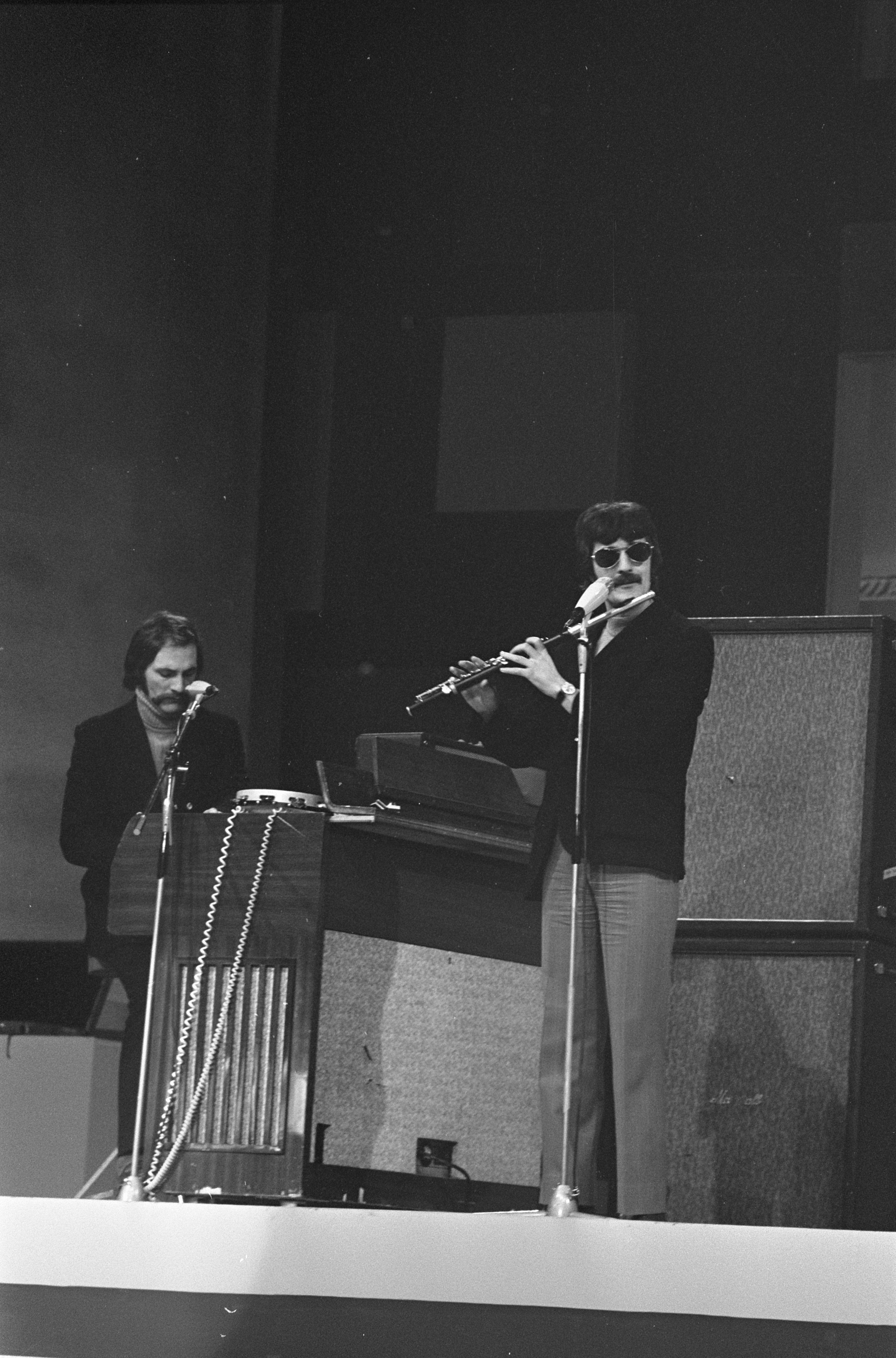
Mike Pinder and Ray Thomas rehearsing (1969)

Thomas and Pinder then recruited guitarist Denny Laine, drummer Graeme Edge, and bassist Clint Warwick to form a new, blues-based band, The Moody Blues. Signed to Decca Records, their first album, The Magnificent Moodies, yielded a No. 1 UK hit (No. 10 in the US) with "Go Now". Thomas sang lead vocals on George and Ira Gershwin's "It Ain't Necessarily So" from the musical Porgy and Bess. He shared lead vocals with Laine on "23rd Psalm" which was recorded in 1964 but remained unreleased until 2014.

His flute featured on three songs on the album—"Something You Got", "I've Got a Dream", and "Let Me Go"—as well as the single "From the Bottom of My Heart", after he had more or less pushed himself to learn playing. Thomas said in a 1986 interview that

"I Don't Want to Go On Without You" wasn't finished when it was released; it should've had a flute on it. When we did Thank Your Lucky Stars, I just took a flute on and pretended to play it. I got dozens of letters saying how great the flute playing was and I wasn't even on it. That's auto suggestion.

When Warwick left the band (followed by Laine a few months later) he was briefly replaced by Rod Clark. Thomas then suggested his and Pinder's old bandmate John Lodge as a permanent replacement and also recruited Justin Hayward to replace Laine. With this line-up the band released seven successful albums between 1967 and 1972, and became known for their pioneering orchestral sound.

Although they initially tried to continue singing R&B covers and novelty tunes, they were confronted over this by an audience member, and with their finances deteriorating they made a conscious decision to focus only on their own original material.

Following the lead of Pinder, Hayward, and Lodge, Thomas also started writing songs. The first he contributed to the group's repertoire were "Another Morning" and "Twilight Time" on the 1967 Days of Future Passed. The album is regarded as a progressive rock landmark, and Thomas's flute solo on the single "Nights in White Satin" one of its defining moments. His flute became an integral part of the band's music, even as Pinder began to use the mellotron keyboard. Thomas stated that a number of his compositions on the band's earlier albums were made in a studio broom closet, with himself writing songs on a glockenspiel. Hayward has spoken of Thomas's learning Transcendental Meditation in 1967, along with other members of the group. In a 2015 interview Thomas said that he and Pinder had contributed backing vocals to the song "I Am the Walrus" by the Beatles, as well as providing harmonicas for "The Fool on the Hill".

Thomas and Pinder both acted as the band's onstage MCs, as heard on the live album Caught Live + 5 and seen in the Live at the Isle of Wight Festival DVD. Thomas started to become a more prolific writer for the group, penning songs such as "Legend of a Mind"—an ode to LSD guru and friend of the band, Timothy Leary, and a popular live favourite—and "Dr. Livingstone, I Presume" for In Search of the Lost Chord, and "Dear Diary" and "Lazy Day" for On the Threshold of a Dream, as well as co-writing "Are You Sitting Comfortably?" with Hayward.

The Moody Blues formed their own record label Threshold Records, distributed by Decca in the UK and London in the US, and their first album on the Threshold imprint was To Our Children's Children's Children, a 1969 concept album about eternal life. Thomas wrote and sang lead vocal on "Floating" and "Eternity Road".

When the band began to realise that their method of heavy overdubbing in the studio made most of the songs very difficult to reproduce in concert, they decided to use a more stripped-down sound on their next album A Question of Balance, to be able to play as many songs live as possible. It was their second UK No. 1 album. Thomas wrote and sang "And the Tide Rushes In", reportedly written after having a row with his wife, and was credited with co-writing the album's final track "The Balance" with Edge, while Pinder recited the story.

The Moodies went back to their symphonic sound and heavy overdubbing with Every Good Boy Deserves Favour, their third UK No. 1 album, and Thomas wrote and sang "Our Guessing Game" and "Nice to Be Here", also singing a co-lead vocal with Pinder, Hayward and Lodge on Edge's "After You Came". All five members wrote "Procession".

The final album of the 'core seven' was Seventh Sojourn, their first album to reach No. 1 in the USA. By this time, Pinder had replaced his mellotron with the chamberlin, which produced orchestral sounds more realistically and easily than the mellotron. Thomas wrote and sang "For My Lady".

=== Band hiatus and reformation ===
Thomas released the albums From Mighty Oaks (1975) and Hopes, Wishes and Dreams (1976) after the band temporarily broke up in 1974. During this period he earned his nickname 'The Flute'. Within the band he was also known as 'Tomo' (pronounced tOm-O). The band reformed in 1977 for Octave, which was released in 1978. Thomas provided the songs "Under Moonshine" and "I'm Your Man", and the group continued to release albums throughout the 1980s, with Thomas's "Veteran Cosmic Rocker" and "Painted Smile" being featured on the album Long Distance Voyager. The former song has often been regarded as a theme song for the band itself as a whole and for Thomas in particular, and it again features his use of the harmonica. After contributing "Sorry" and "I Am" (both on the 1983 album The Present) Thomas temporarily stopped writing new songs for the band, for reasons unknown. He took featured lead vocal on Graeme Edge's song "Going Nowhere" (on The Present).

=== Diminishing role and declining health ===
During the group's synth-pop era, Thomas's role in the recording studio diminished, partially due to the synth-pop music being unsuitable for his flute and partially because he was unwell. Despite contributing backing vocals on The Other Side of Life and Sur la Mer, he took no lead vocal role and it is unclear how much, if any, instrumentation he recorded for these two albums; but in any case, none of his instrumentation or vocals ended up on Sur la Mer. Although he is included in the childhood photos depicted on the album's inner sleeve and is given an overall 'group credit', he is not given a performing band credit. Patrick Moraz, who had replaced Pinder as the band's keyboardist, objected to Thomas's exclusion from the album and pushed for the band to return to the deeper sound that they had achieved with Pinder. Thomas is credited with tambourine, harmonica or saxophone on The Other Side of Life, but it is unknown how many, if any, instrumental contributions of his ended up on the released version of the album, and at this point he was largely relegated to the role of a backup singer.

=== Resilience and final years in the band ===
On The Moody Blues' 1991 release Keys of the Kingdom, Thomas played a substantial role in the studio for the first time since 1983, writing "Celtic Sonant" and co-writing "Never Blame the Rainbows for the Rain" with Justin Hayward. He contributed his first ambient flute piece in eight years; however, his health declined, and his last album with the group was Strange Times, to which he contributed his final composition for the group, "My Little Lovely". He also provided a co-lead vocal with Hayward and Lodge on their song "Sooner or Later (Walking On Air)".

Thomas permanently retired at the end of 2002. In a 2014 interview with Pollstar.com, drummer Graeme Edge stated that Thomas had retired due to illness. He had been suffering from cerebellar ataxia, which affected his balance and made performing impossible. The Moody Blues – consisting only of Hayward, Lodge and Edge (Edge being the only remaining original member) plus four long-serving touring band members, including Gordon Marshall on percussion and Norda Mullen who took over Thomas's flute parts – only released one further studio album, December, following his departure from the band.

=== Final years and prostate cancer diagnosis ===
In July 2009 it became known that Thomas had written at least two of his songs– "Adam and I" and "My Little Lovely"– for his son and his grandson Robert, respectively. It was also revealed that he had married again, to his longtime girlfriend Lee Lightle, in a ceremony at the Church of the Holy Cross in Mwnt, Ceredigion Wales, on 9 July 2009.

Thomas released his two solo albums, remastered, in a boxset on 24 September 2010. The set includes, with the two albums, a remastered quad version of "From Mighty Oaks", a new song "The Trouble With Memories", a previously unseen promo video of "High Above My Head" and an interview conducted by fellow Moody Blues founder Mike Pinder. The boxset was released through Esoteric Recordings/Cherry Red Records.

In October 2014, Thomas posted this statement on his website:

After the tragic death of Alvin Stardust and the brave response to Prostate Awareness by his widow, Julie, in following up on what Alvin had intended to say about the disease, I have decided to help in some small way. I was diagnosed in September 2013 with prostate cancer. My cancer was in-operable but I have a fantastic doctor who immediately started me on a new treatment that has had 90% success rate. The cancer is being held in remission but I'll be receiving this treatment for the rest of my life. I have four close friends who have all endured some kind of surgery or treatment for this cancer and all are doing well. While I don't like to talk publicly about my health problems, after Alvin's death, I decided it was time I spoke out. A cancer diagnosis can shake your world and your family's but if caught in time it can be cured or held in remission. I urge all males to get tested NOW. Don't put it off by thinking it won't happen to me. It needs to be caught early. It's only a blood test – a few minutes out your day to save yourself from this disease. Love and God Bless, Ray.

In later years Thomas resumed flute playing with other musicians, one instance of which was for the song "L'urlo nelle ossa", on the 2016 album Eros & Thanatos by Italian band Syndone. He also played flute on the track "Simply Magic" on John Lodge's 2015 album 10,000 Light Years Ago and recorded with Moody Bluegrass.

== Death ==
For many years Thomas lived in Cobham, Surrey where a Threshold Records shop was also established. Thomas died at his home in Cobham on 4 January 2018, at the age of 76. The official announcement, made by his record company, did not give any cause. It was later revealed that Thomas had died of a heart attack.

Fellow band member John Lodge said, "Ray was my best pal. I met Ray when I was 14. We were two young kids from Birmingham who were reaching for the stars — and I think we got there. I'm really pleased that Ray was around to know we'd be inducted into the Rock and Roll Hall of Fame. I spoke to Ray just before Christmas — because his birthday was after Christmas, on the 29th — and we had a long conversation. We're very close friends — or were very close friends. Very sad. Very, very sad."

Thomas was posthumously inducted into the Rock and Roll Hall of Fame, as a member of The Moody Blues, in April 2018.

== Instruments ==
Although he most commonly played flute, Thomas was a multi-instrumentalist, who also played piccolo, oboe, harmonica, saxophone, bass flute, and an EMS VCS 3 synthesizer. He frequently played tambourine and also shook maracas during the group's R&B phase. The 1972 video for "I'm Just a Singer (In a Rock and Roll Band)" features Thomas appearing to play the baritone saxophone, although Pinder says on his website that this was just for effect in the video and that Thomas did not play saxophone on the recording.

== Discography ==
=== Studio albums ===
- From Mighty Oaks (1975)
- Hopes, Wishes and Dreams (1976)

== Compilations ==
- "Words & Music" (2020)

== Compositions ==
=== The Moody Blues ===
- 1967: "Another Morning" from Days of Future Passed
- 1967: "Twilight Time" from Days of Future Passed
- 1968: "Dr. Livingstone, I Presume" from In Search of the Lost Chord
- 1968: "Legend of a Mind" from In Search of the Lost Chord
- 1968: "Visions of Paradise" (with Justin Hayward) from In Search of the Lost Chord
- 1969: "Dear Diary" from On the Threshold of a Dream
- 1969: "Lazy Day" from On the Threshold of a Dream
- 1969: "Are You Sitting Comfortably?" (with Justin Hayward) from On the Threshold of a Dream
- 1969: "Floating" from To Our Children's Children's Children
- 1969: "Eternity Road" from To Our Children's Children's Children
- 1969: "Watching and Waiting" (with Justin Hayward) from To Our Children's Children's Children
- 1970: "And the Tide Rushes In" from A Question of Balance
- 1970: "The Balance" (with Graeme Edge) from A Question of Balance
- 1971: "Procession" (with Justin Hayward, John Lodge, Mike Pinder, and Graeme Edge) from Every Good Boy Deserves Favour
- 1971: "Our Guessing Game" from Every Good Boy Deserves Favour
- 1971: "Nice to Be Here" from Every Good Boy Deserves Favour
- 1971: "The Dreamer" (with Justin Hayward): an out-take now added to the Every Good Boy Deserves Favour CD
- 1972: "For My Lady" from Seventh Sojourn
- 1978: "Under Moonshine" from Octave
- 1978: "I'm Your Man" from Octave
- 1981: "Painted Smile" from Long Distance Voyager
- 1981: "Reflective Smile" from Long Distance Voyager
- 1981: "Veteran Cosmic Rocker" from Long Distance Voyager
- 1983: "I Am" from The Present
- 1983: "Sorry" from The Present
- 1983: "Burning Gas, Smoking Grass" unfinished song from "The Present" sessions
- 1991: "Celtic Sonant" from Keys of the Kingdom
- 1991: "Never Blame the Rainbows for the Rain" (with Justin Hayward) from Keys of the Kingdom
- 1999: "My Little Lovely" from Strange Times

=== Solo ===
- 1975: "From Mighty Oaks" from From Mighty Oaks
- 1975: "Hey Mama Life" from From Mighty Oaks
- 1975: "Play It Again" from From Mighty Oaks
- 1975: "Rock A Bye Baby Blues" from From Mighty Oaks
- 1975: "High Above My Head" from From Mighty Oaks
- 1975: "Love Is The Key" from From Mighty Oaks
- 1975: "You Make Me Feel Alright" from From Mighty Oaks
- 1975: "Adam And I" from From Mighty Oaks
- 1975: "I Wish We Could Fly" from From Mighty Oaks
- 1976: "In Your Song" from Hopes, Wishes and Dreams
- 1976: "Friends" from Hopes, Wishes and Dreams
- 1976: "We Need Love" from Hopes, Wishes and Dreams
- 1976: "Within Your Eyes" from Hopes, Wishes and Dreams
- 1976: "One Night Stand" from Hopes, Wishes and Dreams
- 1976: "Keep On Searching" from Hopes, Wishes and Dreams
- 1976: "Didn't I" from Hopes, Wishes and Dreams
- 1976: "Migration" from Hopes, Wishes and Dreams
- 1976: "Carousel" from Hopes, Wishes and Dreams
- 1976: "The Last Dream" from Hopes, Wishes and Dreams
- 2010: "The Trouble With Memories" (with Bias Boshell) from From Mighty Oaks/Hopes, Wishes and Dreams box set
