= Mike Pinder =

British musician (1941–2024)

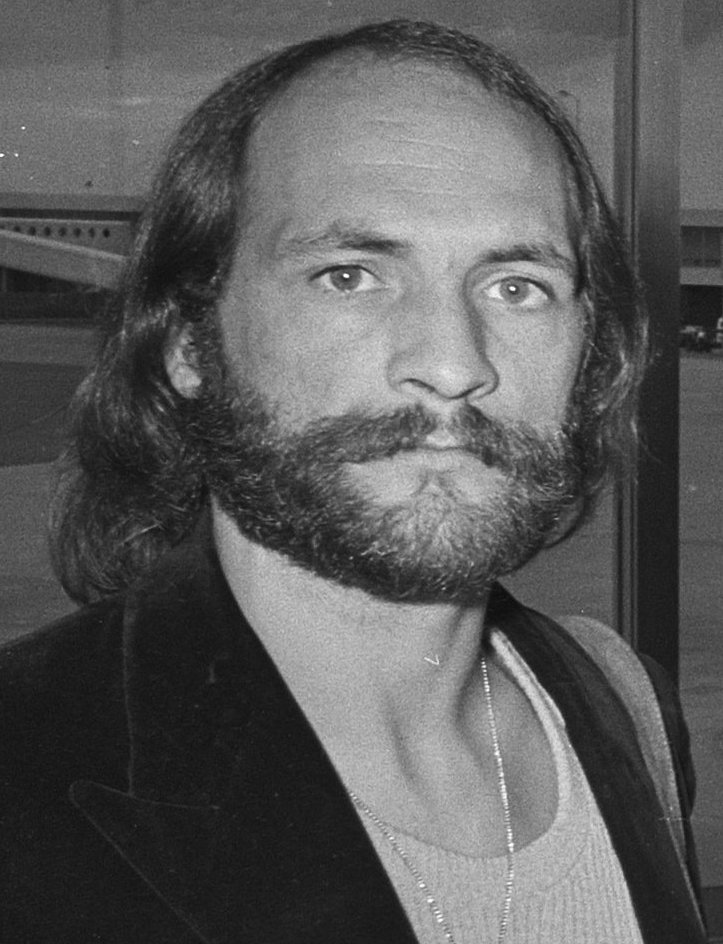
- Pinder in 1970

Background information
- Born: Michael Thomas Pinder; 27 December 1941; Erdington, Birmingham, England
- Died: 24 April 2024 (aged 82) California, U.S.
- Genres: Psychedelic rock; R&B; progressive rock; symphonic rock
- Occupation: Musician
- Instruments: Keyboards; vocals
- Labels: Threshold; One Step
- Spouse(s): Donna Arkoff Roth; Taralee Grant

Michael Thomas Pinder (27 December 1941 – 24 April 2024) was an English keyboardist, singer and songwriter. A founding member and the original keyboard player of the Moody Blues, he was also the band's principal arranger during the run of concept albums that began with Days of Future Passed (1967). Pinder left the group after recording Octave (1978) and continued to record and produce music. In 2018, he was inducted into the Rock and Roll Hall of Fame as a member of the Moody Blues.

Pinder was an early exponent of the Mellotron, a keyboard that plays back sounds recorded on tape. His modifications and studio work helped give the Moody Blues their orchestral sound and popularise the instrument in rock music. He co-founded the recording studio Indigo Ranch and later helped bring the sounds of tape keyboards to digital samplers.

Pinder's songs drew on meditation, different spiritual traditions and his fascination with how the mind might connect with the universe. His interest in psychedelics and the band's friendship with Timothy Leary linked him to the 1960s counterculture in Britain and the United States. He moved to California during the Moody Blues' 1970s hiatus.

== Early life ==
Pinder was born in Erdington, Birmingham, on 27 December 1941. His father, Bert, was a coach driver and his mother, Gladys (née Lay), was a barmaid. His childhood fascination with rocket ships and outer space earned him the nickname "Mickey the Moon Boy" and became a recurring theme in his songwriting.

As a teenager, Pinder played in several Birmingham bands, including the Checkers, who won first prize of £50 in a talent competition. He and Ray Thomas played in the rock and roll group El Riot and the Rebels, which supported the Beatles at Tenbury in 1963. With the short-lived Krew Kats, the two spent two months in Hamburg, appearing in clubs where the Beatles had performed. Back in Birmingham after the Krew Kats disbanded, Pinder spent about 18 months as a development engineer at Streetly Electronics, the Bradley brothers' Mellotron factory. He tested instruments and carried out quality control. Pinder recalled spending time in each manufacturing department, which gave him a working knowledge of how the instrument was built. He later drew on that experience to keep the band's Mellotron working on tour.

== Career ==
=== Formation and early recordings ===
In May 1964, Pinder co-founded the Moody Blues with Thomas, Denny Laine, Clint Warwick and Graeme Edge. He traced the name in part to Duke Ellington's "Mood Indigo". Its initials also matched those of Mitchells & Butlers, a Birmingham brewery the group hoped would sponsor them.

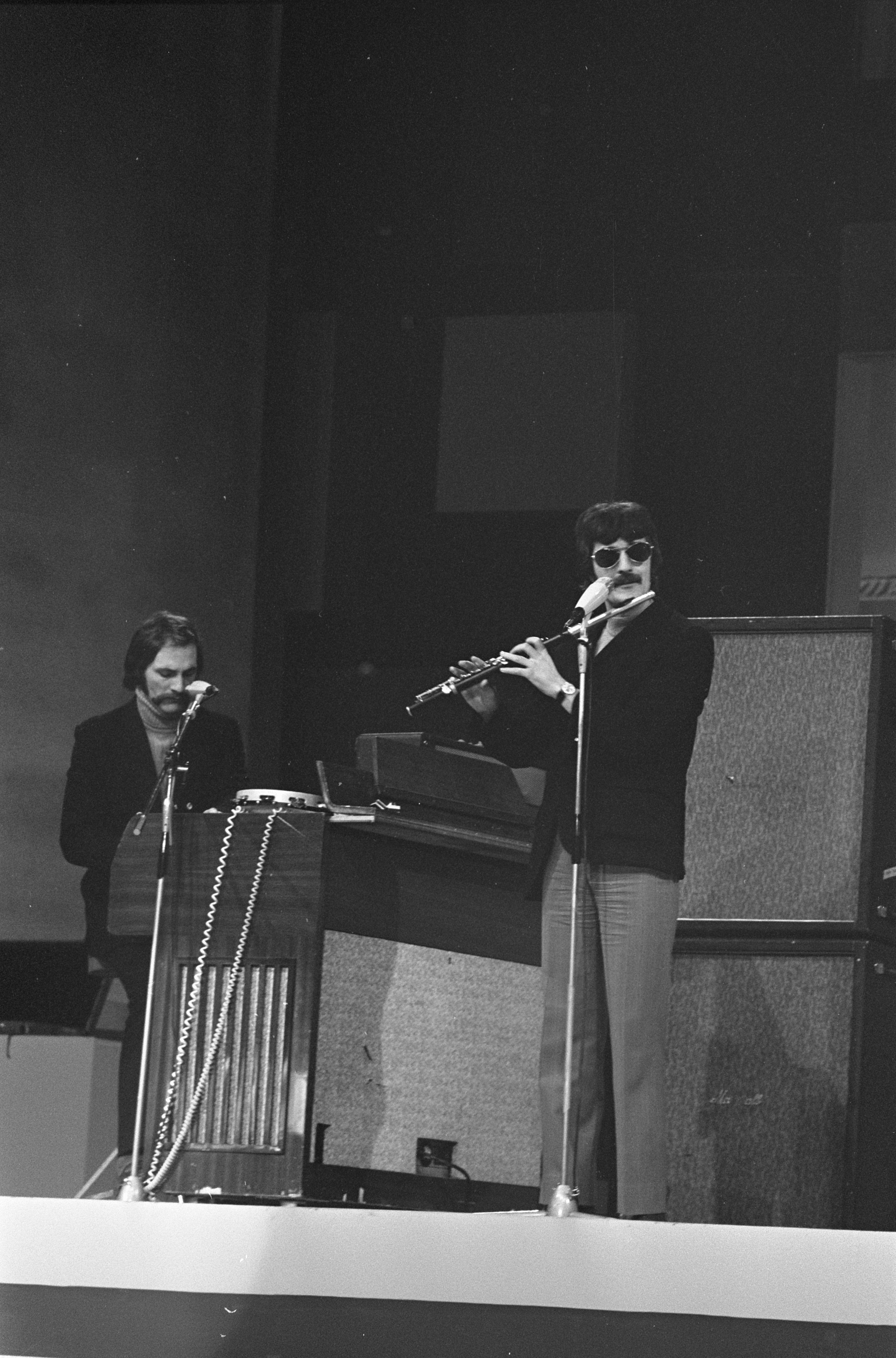
Pinder and Ray Thomas rehearsing (1969)

The band moved to London and signed with Decca Records, with London Records issuing their records in the United States. Their debut single, a cover of Bobby Parker's "Steal Your Heart Away", failed to chart. The breakthrough came with their next single, a cover of Bessie Banks' "Go Now" that reached number one in the UK and the top ten in the US in 1965. The album The Magnificent Moodies followed in July 1965, titled Go Now in the US. Pinder took his first lead vocal on its cover of James Brown's "I Don't Mind". Another track, "Bye Bye Bird", was issued as a single in France.

Pinder and Laine began a songwriting partnership, providing most of the band's B-sides from 1964 to 1966. Two of their songs, "From the Bottom of My Heart (I Love You)" and "Everyday", were released as A-sides and charted in the UK in 1965, as did the band's cover of The Drifters' "I Don't Want to Go On Without You". The band recorded two more of their songs, "Boulevard de la Madelaine" and "Life's Not Life", before Laine and Warwick left in 1966. Another of their songs, "People Gotta Go", appeared on a French EP and later on a CD reissue of The Magnificent Moodies.

=== 'Core Seven' period ===
Pinder helped recruit Justin Hayward to replace Laine, phoning him and collecting him from the railway station. John Lodge joined on bass and vocals after Rod Clarke's brief stint as Warwick's replacement. This line-up recorded the band's next seven studio albums. An audience member's criticism of their R&B set helped persuade the musicians to concentrate on original songs. They paired Hayward's "Fly Me High", their first single in the new line-up, with Pinder's "Really Haven't Got the Time" on the B-side. Pinder also recorded "Please Think About It" in 1967, though it first appeared on Caught Live + 5 in 1977.

The 1967 single "Love and Beauty", which Pinder wrote and sang, marked his first use of the Mellotron on a Moody Blues recording. The instrument became central to the band's orchestral sound, and Hayward later said Pinder's modifications "gave us our identifiable early sound". The new line-up's first album, Days of Future Passed (1967), grew out of a project for Decca's Deram label to demonstrate stereo recording. It combined the band's songs with orchestral passages and sold more than a million copies in the US. Pinder contributed two songs, "The Sunset" and "Dawn Is a Feeling", singing the bridge on the latter with Hayward on lead. He also narrated Edge's opening and closing poems, "Morning Glory" and "Late Lament".

Hayward recalled that Pinder and Edge developed many of the ideas behind the band's concept albums. Pinder wrote and sang "The Best Way to Travel" and "Om" on In Search of the Lost Chord (1968). He won an Ivor Novello Award for "A Simple Game", the B-side of the album's single "Ride My See-Saw". An alternate version with Hayward singing lead appeared on the album's 2006 expanded edition.

For On the Threshold of a Dream (1969), Pinder wrote a closing suite in which the two parts of "Have You Heard" frame the instrumental "The Voyage". Parts of the suite later featured in Radio Caroline's Loving Awareness jingles in the 1970s. The band established its own label, Threshold Records, in 1969 and released To Our Children's Children's Children that year. Pinder sang lead on "Sun Is Still Shining" and "Out and In", the latter co-written with Lodge.

Pinder's deep speaking voice became a feature of the albums through his readings of Edge's poetry, including "The Word", "In the Beginning" (with Edge and Hayward), "The Dream" and "The Balance". Pinder and Thomas also spoke for the band onstage, as heard in the 1969 concert released on Caught Live + 5 and in the film of their 1970 Isle of Wight Festival performance.

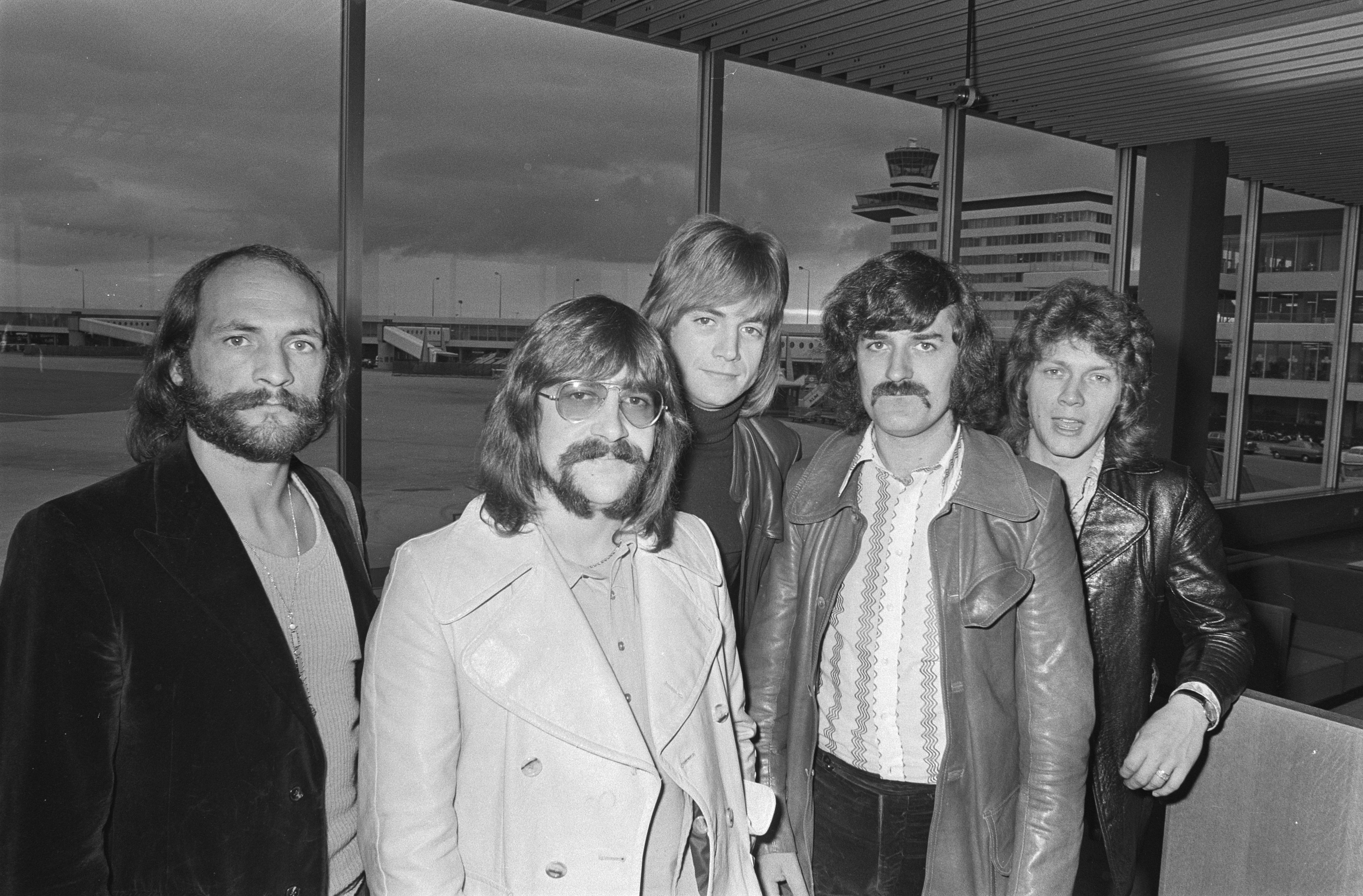
The Moody Blues arrive at Amsterdam Airport Schiphol, Netherlands, in 1970

Pinder wrote and sang "Melancholy Man" and "How Is It (We Are Here)" on A Question of Balance (1970). "Melancholy Man" reached number one in France. His "My Song" closed Every Good Boy Deserves Favour (1971), on which he shared the writing credit for the opening "Procession" with the rest of the band and shared lead vocals on Edge's "After You Came". The Four Tops covered two of Pinder's songs, "A Simple Game" and "So Deep Within You", taking "A Simple Game" to number three in the UK in 1971. Pinder recalled playing electric guitar with John Lennon at Lennon's home as they worked on material for Imagine (1971). He had planned to play the Mellotron at one of the sessions. When he found the tapes in Lennon's machine tangled in what he later described as "a bowl of spaghetti", he played tambourine on "I Don't Want to Be a Soldier Mama I Don't Wanna Die".

For Seventh Sojourn (1972), Pinder played the tape-based Chamberlin and wrote and sang "Lost in a Lost World" and "When You're a Free Man".

=== Band hiatus, reformation and departure ===
After several years of touring, the Moody Blues went on hiatus in 1974 and Pinder moved to Malibu, California. During the break, Hayward visited Pinder and they began planning an album they had discussed for years. Hayward, who credited Pinder's Mellotron parts with shaping his songs, recalled that Pinder withdrew when Lodge and producer Tony Clarke proposed a project involving all four. Hayward and Lodge went on to make Blue Jays (1975) with Clarke producing.

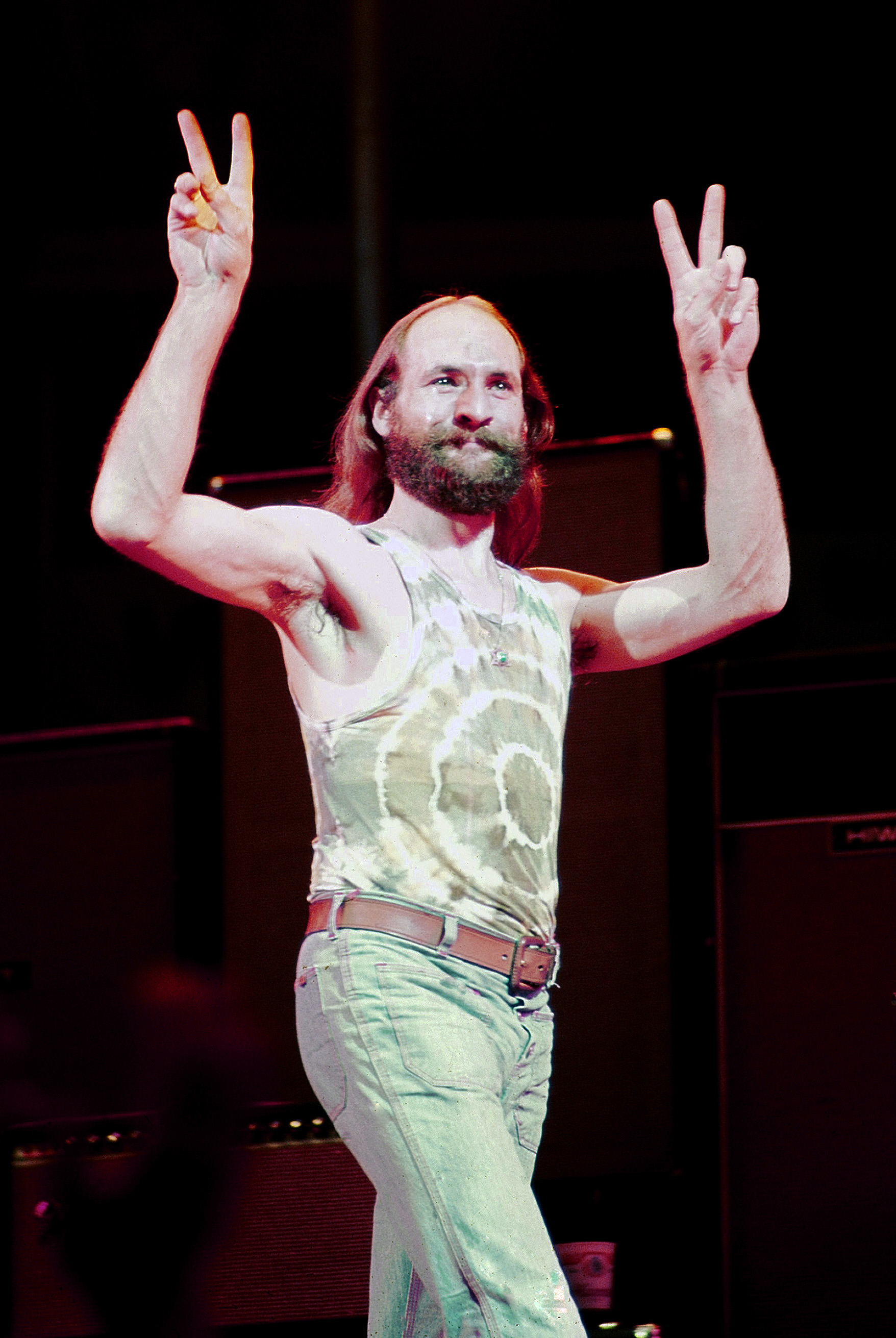
Pinder in 1974

Pinder recorded his first solo album, The Promise (1976), at Indigo Ranch, the Malibu studio he built with Richard Kaplan. Kaplan engineered the sessions and Robert Margouleff helped mix the album, which the Moody Blues' Threshold label released.

The band regrouped in 1977 to make their ninth studio album, Octave (1978), and recorded part of it at Indigo Ranch after a fire at the Record Plant. Pinder's sole songwriting contribution was "One Step into the Light", a song left over from The Promise sessions. He also sang backing vocals and played synthesiser. His keyboard parts included the introduction to Lodge's "Steppin' in a Slide Zone" and the instrumental climax of Edge's "I'll Be Level with You". Pinder declined to tour after the album, and the band brought in Swiss keyboardist Patrick Moraz, formerly of Yes.

=== Legal disputes ===
In 1981, Pinder sought an injunction to prevent the release of Long Distance Voyager under the Moody Blues name. According to an account in Prog, Pinder expected to continue recording with the group after giving up touring. Lodge said the other members understood he had left permanently. Hayward recalled that Pinder brought the case and that his lawyers involved Clarke, the band's former producer. The High Court refused the application in May 1981.

Pinder filed a separate suit in Los Angeles Superior Court in 1994. He alleged that he was owed money under a 1981 royalty agreement and sought damages and dissolution of the band's partnership. His lawyer, Neville Johnson, had previously represented Moraz in his suit against the band.

=== After the Moody Blues ===
Pinder released his second solo album, Among the Stars, on his own One Step label in 1994. Initially available by mail order, it featured guitarist Michael Sembello and bassist Alphonso Johnson. His next releases, A Planet With One Mind (1995) and A People With One Heart (1996), drew on his experience narrating the Moody Blues' albums. The first combined Pinder's music with readings of seven children's stories from different cultures, including Tomie dePaola's The Legend of the Indian Paintbrush and Laurence Yep's The Butterfly Boy. Pinder planned a third volume, An Earth With One Spirit. The American Library Association selected A Planet With One Mind for its 1997 list of notable recordings for children. Pinder continued recording at home and worked again with musicians from his Moody Blues years. In 2007, Mix reported that Clarke had joined him at Prairie Sun Recording in Sonoma County while Pinder was producing the Pinder Brothers, his sons' band. Clarke produced "Waves Crash" and "Empty Streets", with Thomas adding flute from the UK. The three met again in 2009.

Thomas said in an interview published in 2015 that he and Pinder still spoke every week. That year, both played on "Simply Magic", from Lodge's album 10,000 Light Years Ago. Thomas played flute and suggested that Lodge invite Pinder to play Mellotron. A tribute from Pinder was read at Thomas's funeral in 2018.

In 2017, the television series Agents of S.H.I.E.L.D. used Pinder's "Have You Heard, Part Two" at the opening and again near the end of its episode "Self Control".

In April 2018, Pinder was inducted into the Rock and Roll Hall of Fame as a member of the Moody Blues. Pinder did not give an acceptance speech at the ceremony. He later wrote that the Moody Blues took the stage five hours into the event and that he felt it was fitting for the band's touring members, Graeme Edge, Justin Hayward and John Lodge, to speak first. He said he was glad the band had been inducted for the fans' sake, adding that "the fans are my hall of fame".

== Music technology and production ==
=== Tape keyboards and arrangements ===
In 1966, Pinder obtained a second-hand Mark II Mellotron from the Dunlop works social club in Birmingham. The Mellotron is an electromechanical keyboard developed from the American Chamberlin tape keyboard. It plays short recordings of instruments and other sounds from strips of magnetic tape. The Mark II had one keyboard for accompaniment sounds and another for lead sounds. Pinder replaced the accompaniment tapes with a second set of lead tapes, allowing him to sustain a passage on one keyboard while the tapes on the other rewound. He wanted to bring the cascading string sound of Mantovani into rock music. A 2023 study of electronic instruments notes that later Mellotron models incorporated some of Pinder's modifications.

At an early US show, the Mellotron's tapes spilled out. Pinder got the instrument working again within 20 minutes while the lighting crew projected cartoons for the audience.

As the band's principal arranger until his departure, Pinder built Mellotron parts around his bandmates' melodies. Hayward recalled that the parts were usually added in a separate session after the rhythm section. He said the Mellotron "made my songs work" and changed the way he thought about arranging them. Working with producer Tony Clarke and recording engineer Derek Varnals, Pinder developed a more sustained orchestral sound. On Hayward's "Nights in White Satin", Clarke had Pinder overdub several Mellotron parts and Varnals added reverb. On Thomas's "Legend of a Mind", Pinder varied the tape speed to bend the pitch and used stereo panning and reverb to give the sound a sense of movement.

On To Our Children's Children's Children (1969), the Mellotron helped create the sound of a rocket taking off at the start of Edge's "Higher and Higher", which Pinder narrated. Varnals recalled placing microphones by the motors of the Mellotron and Hammond organ and layering those sounds with guitar-amplifier noise and muffled drums. Pinder's Mellotron playing also featured on Edge's instrumental "Beyond" and on "Watching and Waiting", the closing song written by Hayward and Thomas.

From 1967 onwards, Pinder's instrumental credits with the band included Mellotron, organ, piano, harpsichord, Moog synthesizer, autoharp, tanpura, cello, bass, acoustic and electric guitars, and percussion including tabla and tambourine. He also sang lead and harmony vocals.

Pinder introduced the Mellotron to his friend John Lennon, and Paul McCartney played its flute sound in the introduction to the Beatles' "Strawberry Fields Forever". The two bands' records drew Ian McDonald to the instrument, which he brought to King Crimson. Moraz recalled using three Mellotrons to reproduce Pinder's sounds on tour with the Moody Blues.

=== Studio work and digital sampling ===
Pinder was already discussing a home studio in 1971. He and Richard Kaplan, who had worked on lighting and photography for the Moody Blues, built Indigo Ranch in Malibu's Solstice Canyon for their own recording projects. Pinder named the studio after "Mood Indigo". Kaplan recalled working with him on equipment and credited him with shaping the studio's acoustics. They used an Aengus console with electronics designed by Deane Jensen.

By 1976, Indigo Ranch was taking on outside clients. Billboard identified Pinder, Kaplan and Michael Hofmann as its principals and reported sessions by Billy Preston, Albert Lee and American Flyer, who worked there with George Martin. Kaplan and Hofmann subsequently bought the studio from Pinder. In later years it hosted acts including Korn and Slipknot. Kaplan ran it until 2006, and the property burned in a wildfire the following year.

Pinder's production work in California also included Stephen Freelight's 1972 album, Wave of Great Change, which featured Bernie Leadon and Don Felder of The Eagles. Pinder played sitar, bass, and keyboards on the album, which remained unreleased until 1995.

Pinder later used an Atari ST for music recording and MIDI sequencing. He gave demonstrations with keyboardist Greg Whelchel and hosted a MIDI show at the 1989 World of Atari. He described his association with Atari as informal in an interview with Tape Op.

In the early 1990s, Pinder digitised and looped his preferred Mellotron sounds for use on a sampler and also digitised Chamberlin sounds. He supplied instruments and helped with production and quality control for David Kean and Justin Mayer's Michael Pinder Presents Mellotron, a CD-ROM library of Mellotron and Chamberlin samples for digital samplers. Electronic Musician reviewed the library in 1995.

== Spirituality and songwriting ==
In a remembrance after his death, Taralee Pinder recalled that her husband read widely about religion and was interested in where science and spirituality might meet. He told her that as a child he sometimes felt he could leave his body, look out into the street and return, experiences she described as astral projection. She linked his fascination with inner and outer space to songs such as "The Best Way to Travel" and "Out and In".

Hayward recalled in 2013 that he, Pinder, Edge and Thomas began learning Transcendental Meditation in 1967. Several members of the band were also experimenting with psychedelics, and the following year's In Search of the Lost Chord reflected the wider counterculture's interest in consciousness and spiritual exploration. "Om", named for the sacred syllable, closed the album with a chanted refrain, while "The Best Way to Travel" imagined journeys through space by thought. The music writer Rob Chapman identified the latter as one of the band's psychedelic songs. AllMusic's Bruce Eder compared the mysticism in Pinder's songs to that of the English Romantic poets.

The Moody Blues' friendship with Timothy Leary connected the British band to the Californian counterculture. Leary joined the band onstage during "Legend of a Mind" at a 1969 event in Los Angeles. Thomas recalled that Leary invited him, Pinder and Hayward to his commune near San Francisco. Pinder later dedicated his song "When You're a Free Man" to Leary.

A 1971 article in Sounds described Pinder as a "driving power" in the band. Speaking to Penny Valentine, he said the group had tried to express its ideals and convey hope through its albums. He also described his beliefs at the time, speaking of a renewed faith in the Bible and Jesus Christ and criticising some of the meditation and occult teachings he had explored.

Pinder continued to draw on a range of spiritual ideas in his later recordings. Reviewing The Promise (1976), Glenn Astarita noted Indian musical motifs, and James Turner described its spoken-word piece "The Seed" as New Age. Discussing the title song, Pinder recalled an interest in ancient sites such as Stonehenge as well as the work of NASA. The lyrics of "One Step into the Light" (1978) depict meditative breathing and a life force. In a 1997 interview, he credited Joseph Campbell's work and Carl Jung's idea of the collective unconscious with inspiring his spoken-word recordings of folk tales from different cultures.

Taralee also linked Pinder's sense of connection to the universe with the way he wrote songs. He likened listening for melodies to fishing in a river. She recalled that, on hearing a song by George Harrison, he recognised an idea he had come across himself and said, "George hooked it!" Pinder told the same story in a 2014 interview, explaining how different musicians could draw on the same idea and give it their own form.

In later interviews, Pinder recalled his childhood fascination with the sky and described experiences he understood as UFO sightings. He compared one figure he remembered seeing to Michael Rennie in the 1951 film The Day the Earth Stood Still and recommended the writings of Zecharia Sitchin, an advocate of the ancient astronauts hypothesis. The band's cosmic imagery also took on a spiritual meaning for some listeners. Hayward recalled that a group of fans in San Antonio treated the band as messianic figures and expected to be taken aboard a spacecraft when the musicians arrived.

== Family and personal life ==
Pinder married Donna Arkoff in 1970, and their son Daniel was born the following year. In explaining his move to California during the band's hiatus, Pinder said that Arkoff, who was from Los Angeles, wanted to return there with their son and that he had enjoyed visiting California on tour. The marriage ended in divorce.

Pinder later married Taralee Grant, with whom he raised two sons, Matt and Michael Lee, in northern California. Pinder later cited his wish to raise his children away from show business when explaining why he declined to tour after Octave.

All three of his sons became musicians. Daniel, the eldest, worked as a film music editor and consultant, with credits including Pirates of the Caribbean: The Curse of the Black Pearl and The Da Vinci Code. Matt and Michael Lee perform as the Pinder Brothers and have released recordings including Jupiter Falls, Ordinary Man and Melancholy Sea (2015). Pinder played Mellotron on some of their recordings and re-recorded "One Step into the Light" with his sons.

== Death ==
Pinder died at his home in northern California on 24 April 2024, aged 82. He had lived with dementia for several years. He was the last surviving member of the band's original line-up.

== Discography ==
=== Solo discography ===
Music albums

- The Promise (1976)
- Among the Stars (1994)

Spoken-word albums

- A Planet With One Mind (1995)
- A People With One Heart (1996)

=== The Moody Blues discography ===
Pinder's studio albums with the group run from The Magnificent Moodies (1965) to Octave (1978). His recordings also appear on live and compilation releases.

Studio albums

- The Magnificent Moodies (1965)
- Days of Future Passed (1967)
- In Search of the Lost Chord (1968)
- On the Threshold of a Dream (1969)
- To Our Children's Children's Children (1969)
- A Question of Balance (1970)
- Every Good Boy Deserves Favour (1971)
- Seventh Sojourn (1972)
- Octave (1978)

Live and compilation releases

- This Is The Moody Blues (1974 compilation)
- Caught Live + 5 (1969 concert recording and five previously unreleased studio tracks, issued in 1977)
- Time Traveller (1994 box set)

=== Songwriting contributions to the Moody Blues ===
The early Laine–Pinder credits include singles and recordings for a planned second album that first appeared on the 2014 expanded edition of The Magnificent Moodies.

- 1964: "Lose Your Money (But Don't Lose Your Mind)" (with Denny Laine; single B-side)
- 1965: "From the Bottom of My Heart (I Love You)" (with Denny Laine; single A-side)
- 1965: "And My Baby's Gone" (with Denny Laine; single B-side)
- 1965: "Let Me Go" (with Denny Laine; from The Magnificent Moodies)
- 1965: "Stop!" (with Denny Laine; from The Magnificent Moodies)
- 1965: "True Story" (with Denny Laine; from The Magnificent Moodies)
- 1965: "Thank You Baby" (with Denny Laine; from The Magnificent Moodies)
- 1965: "Everyday" (with Denny Laine; single A-side)
- 1965: "You Don't (All the Time)" (with Denny Laine; single B-side)
- 1966: "People Gotta Go" (with Denny Laine; France-only EP track)
- 1966: "Sad Song" (with Denny Laine, recorded for the planned second album)
- 1966: "Jago & Jilly" (with Denny Laine, from the same sessions)
- 1966: "We're Broken" (with Denny Laine, from the same sessions)
- 1966: "Red Wine" (with Denny Laine, from the same sessions)
- 1966: "Boulevard de la Madelaine" (with Denny Laine, single A-side)
- 1966: "This Is My House (But Nobody Calls)" (with Denny Laine; single B-side)
- 1966: "Life's Not Life" (with Denny Laine; single A-side, released 1967)
- 1966: "He Can Win" (with Denny Laine; single B-side)
- 1967: "Really Haven't Got the Time" (single B-side)
- 1967: "Love and Beauty" (single A-side)
- 1967: "Please Think About It" (first released in 1977 on Caught Live + 5)
- 1967: "Dawn Is a Feeling" (from Days of Future Passed)
- 1967: "The Sunset" (from Days of Future Passed)
- 1968: "The Best Way to Travel" (from In Search of the Lost Chord)
- 1968: "Om" (from In Search of the Lost Chord)
- 1968: "A Simple Game" (single B-side)
- 1969: "So Deep Within You" (from On the Threshold of a Dream)
- 1969: "Have You Heard" (from On the Threshold of a Dream)
- 1969: "The Voyage" (from On the Threshold of a Dream)
- 1969: "Out and In" (with John Lodge; from To Our Children's Children's Children)
- 1969: "Sun Is Still Shining" (from To Our Children's Children's Children)
- 1970: "How Is It (We Are Here)" (from A Question of Balance)
- 1970: "Melancholy Man" (from A Question of Balance)
- 1970: "Mike's Number One" (outtake from A Question of Balance, first released on its 2006 reissue)
- 1971: "Procession" (with John Lodge, Justin Hayward, Ray Thomas and Graeme Edge; from Every Good Boy Deserves Favour)
- 1971: "My Song" (from Every Good Boy Deserves Favour)
- 1972: "Lost in a Lost World" (from Seventh Sojourn)
- 1972: "When You're a Free Man" (from Seventh Sojourn)
- 1978: "One Step into the Light" (from Octave)
