= Graeme Edge =

British musician (1941–2021)

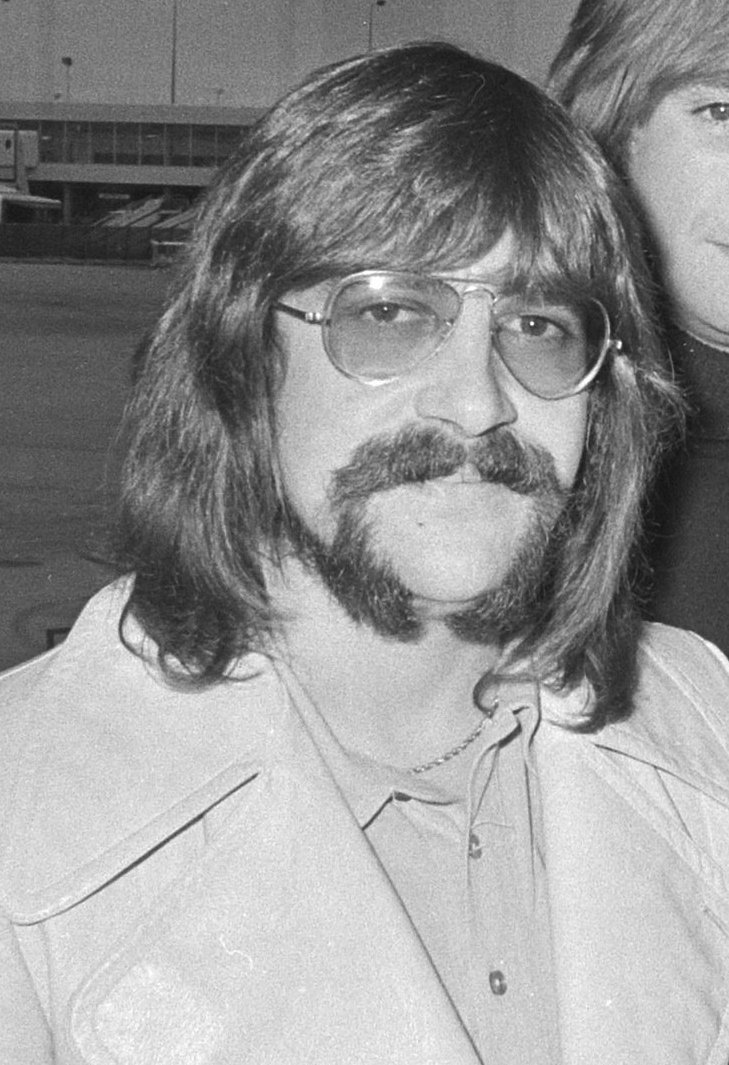
- Edge in 1970

Background information
- Born: Graeme Charles Edge; 30 March 1941; Rocester, Staffordshire, England
- Died: 11 November 2021 (aged 80) Bradenton, Florida, U.S.
- Genres: Rock; rhythm and blues; poetry
- Occupations: Musician; songwriter; poet
- Instruments: Drums; percussion
- Years active: 1964–2018
- Labels: Decca; Threshold; Cherry Red
- Website: graemeedge.com

Graeme Charles Edge (30 March 1941 – 11 November 2021) was an English musician, songwriter and poet, best known as the co-founder, drummer, and only constant member of the English band the Moody Blues. In addition to his work with the Moody Blues, Edge worked as the bandleader of his own outfit, the Graeme Edge Band. He contributed his talents to a variety of other projects throughout his career. In 2018, Edge was inducted into the Rock and Roll Hall of Fame as a member of the Moody Blues.

== Career ==
=== Early career ===
Edge started his career as a musician in the Birmingham-based group Gerry Levene and the Avengers, having previously acted as a manager for Blue Rhythm Band in which he sat in on drums occasionally. Gerry Levene and the Avengers cover of Dr. Feelgood & The Interns "Doctor Feelgood" – released as a single in 1964 – was the recording debut of both Edge and future Move and Wizzard guitarist Roy Wood.

=== The Moody Blues (1964–1966) ===
Born in Rocester, Staffordshire, Graeme Edge was one of the original members of the Moody Blues, alongside singer/guitarist Denny Laine, singer/bassist Clint Warwick, singer/keyboardist Mike Pinder and singer/flautist/harmonica player Ray Thomas. Edge provided a foundation for the original R&B and rock-flavoured band fronted by Laine, playing on all their Decca singles, including the UK chart-topping "Go Now" (January 1965) and other 1965 hit songs: "I Don't Want to Go On Without You", "Everyday" and "From the Bottom of my Heart (I Love You)", which were additionally released in that year.

==== Core seven period (1966–1974) ====
After the departure of Laine and Clint Warwick and the later recruitment of Justin Hayward and John Lodge in 1966, the band continued initially to play the R&B-style material.

Edge became a poet for the band, contributing "Morning Glory" and "Late Lament" to Days of Future Passed in 1967 (narrated by Pinder). Edge himself opened In Search of the Lost Chord (1968) with his brief poem "Departure", though Mike Pinder narrated his "The Word" poem later on that set. Further poems provided by Edge included "In the Beginning" (co-narrated by Hayward, Edge and Pinder in turn) and "The Dream" (spoken by Pinder) for On the Threshold of a Dream (1969). Edge stated in 2018 that the reason most of his poetry was recited by Pinder was that Pinder, having smoked so many cigarettes and drunk so much whisky, had the best voice for it.

Later in 1969, as the band launched their own label, Threshold Records, Edge began contributing songs. His effort "Higher and Higher" (a spoken lyric over music with a dramatic 'rocket blast off' opening; as usual, it was recited by Pinder) commenced the band's fifth album To Our Children's Children's Children, which also featured his instrumental composition "Beyond".

Edge whispered the lyrics to his song "Don't You Feel Small" over band-sung vocals (Pinder, Thomas, Lodge and Hayward) on A Question of Balance (1970), on which he also contributed a closing poem/song co-written with Ray Thomas, "The Balance" (recited by Pinder).

Edge co-wrote and claimed pole position as "lead grunt" on the unusual band-composed opening track "Procession" on their 1971 album Every Good Boy Deserves Favour, on which his song "After You Came" features the four lead vocalists (Thomas, Pinder, Hayward and Lodge) both together and taking brief solo lead lines in turn. Edge's song was later used as the UK B-side to the chart hit "Isn't Life Strange?" in 1972. The first electronic drum is said to have been created by Edge in collaboration with Sussex University professor Brian Groves; the device was used in the song "Procession" from Every Good Boy Deserves Favour.

For their 1972 Seventh Sojourn album, Edge co-wrote "You And Me" with Hayward, who took lead vocal. In 2013, Edge said of Seventh Sojourn:

I didn't [listen to] that album, because I was going through a divorce at the same time and so it was very, very painful for me. Once it was finished, I didn't play it for years and years and years. Never played it. Not that I play our stuff very much anyway, but I never ever played that one. And I hadn't really heard it apart from the [singles] from it, until [1986 when] it came out first time on CD and I had to listen to it digitalised just to sort of say "Yeah, that's fine by me." And I thought, "Well actually, that's not too bad an album!" That's the closest I'll ever be to hearing a Moodies album for the first time.

==== Band hiatus ====
After the Moody Blues' world tour ended in 1974, the band members took a break, during which, between his two solo albums, Edge sailed on a round-the-world voyage with a small crew in his yacht Delia. He returned to recording later in 1974, forming his studio-based The Graeme Edge Band (featuring guitarist/vocalist Adrian Gurvitz and Paul Gurvitz), which first issued a non-album single, "We Like To Do it", on Threshold (TH 18) in July 1974 (this was later added to his first Graeme Edge Band album as a bonus track on the CD release).

The Graeme Edge Band released two albums in the mid-1970s. The first was Kick Off Your Muddy Boots in September 1975 on Threshold, a subsidiary of Decca Records, catalogue number THS 15. It was released as a gatefold with album art by Joe Petagno and featured Adrian and Paul Gurvitz, plus a guest appearance co-drumming with Edge by Ginger Baker (on "Gew Janna Woman"), and backing vocals by fellow Moody Blues member Ray Thomas. This first album reached No. 107 in the U.S. on the Billboard chart. Their second album was Paradise Ballroom in 1977 on the main Decca label and in the United States on the London Records label. The album charted in the US reaching No. 164 on Billboard. It was also released as a gatefold with album art by Petagno, again featuring Adrian and Paul Gurvitz. Edge also appeared as himself in the 2016 film comedy Characterz.

A single, "Everybody Needs Somebody" (taken from the latest album), was issued on Decca (F.13698) with the non-album B-side "Be My Eyes" in June 1977.

==== Band re-formation (1978–2018) ====
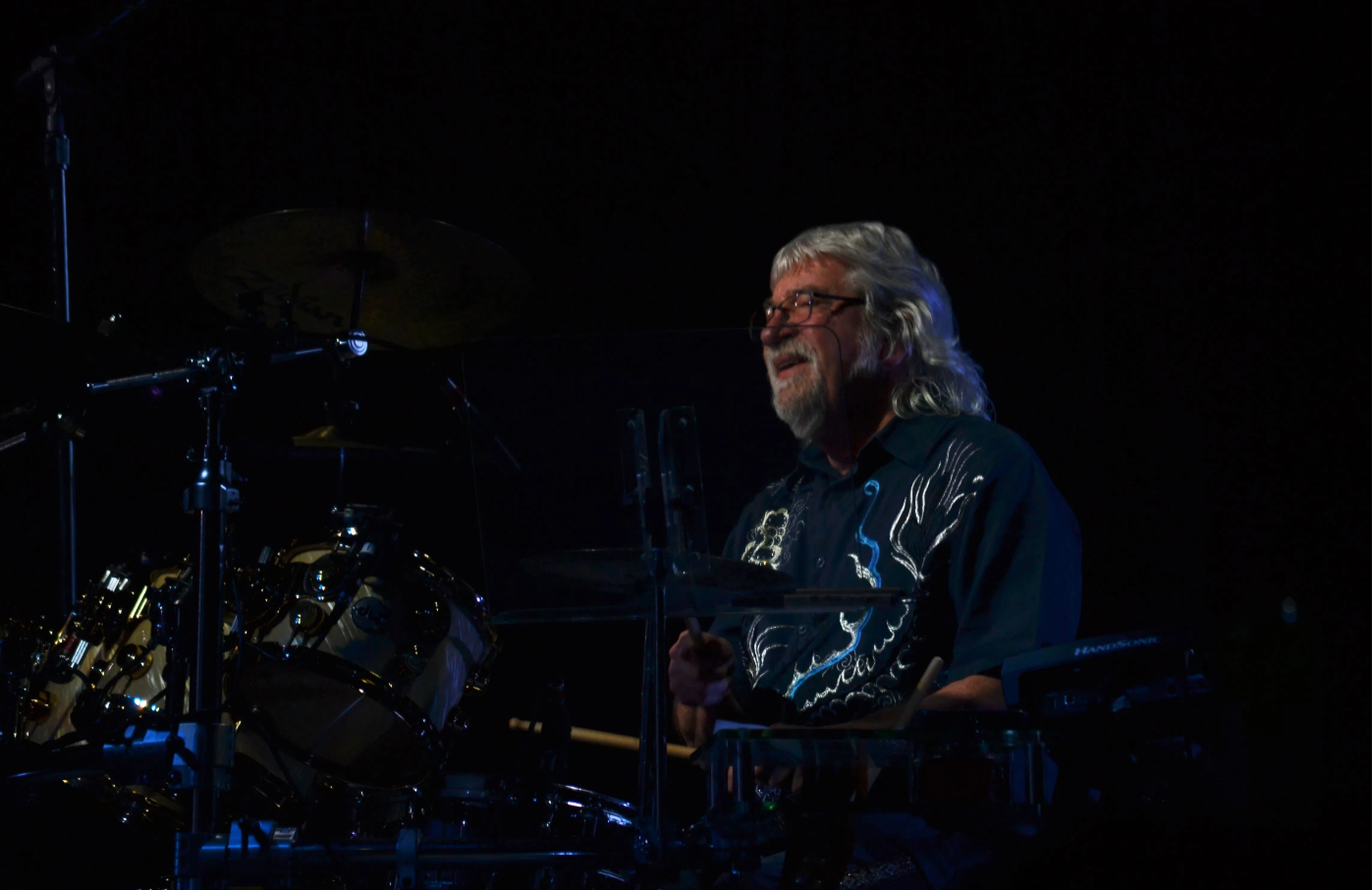
Edge performing in 2018

After the Moody Blues' reunion in 1978, Edge provided "I'll Be Level with You" (sung by the group, led by Hayward) for the album Octave on Decca. After the album was released, Pinder declined to tour with the band and was replaced by ex-Yes keyboardist Patrick Moraz.

For Long Distance Voyager in 1981 Edge contributed "22,000 Days"—the length of an average human lifespan in days—sung by Thomas, Lodge and Hayward; this was also used as the UK B-side of the single "Gemini Dream".

Edge's "Going Nowhere" (sung by Ray Thomas) was his lone composition on The Present album in 1983, and he teamed with Moraz for "The Spirit" (sung by the group's vocalists in harmony) on The Other Side of Life album in 1986.

Edge was not featured as a songwriter or poet on either Sur La Mer (1988) or Keys of the Kingdom (1991) and was not drummer on every track on the latter album; however, he contributed the closing poem/song "Nothing Changes", which was initially narrated by himself and then sung by the Moody Blues (Hayward featured) on the Strange Times album issued in 1999.

Edge was joined onstage by Gordon Marshall as second drummer for Moody Blues concerts from 1991 to 2015 and by Billy Ashbaugh from 2016 on. In addition to drums, Edge provided varied assorted percussion instrumentation, plus additional piano to the Moody Blues' works, and featured his electronic drum kit from the early 1970s onwards on Moody Blues albums, his drumming style being recognisable and distinctive.

Edge participated in the 2011 Moody Blues bluegrass tribute album Moody Bluegrass TWO ... Much Love, providing the lead vocal on a bluegrass-tinged version of his poem "Higher and Higher".

Edge was a fan of Star Trek: Deep Space Nine. An article about him said he had "plenty of time for overseeing some rental properties, doing charity work, playing lots of golf and watching Deep Space Nine at his home on Florida's Gulf Coast".

In 2013, Justin Hayward spoke of Edge's learning Transcendental Meditation in 1967, along with other members of the Moody Blues.

Edge was the only remaining original member of the Moody Blues still performing in the band until his retirement in 2018.

He used DW drums, Zildjian cymbals, Remo heads and Regal Tip drumsticks, namely their 5A model.

== Death ==
Edge died of metastatic cancer at his home in Bradenton, Florida, on 11 November 2021, aged 80. He had previously suffered a stroke in 2016. Hayward announced that after Edge's retirement, the Moody Blues no longer existed.

== Compositions ==
=== The Moody Blues ===
- 1967: "Morning Glory" (part of "The Day Begins") from Days of Future Passed
- 1967: "Late Lament" (part of "Nights in White Satin") from Days of Future Passed
- 1968: "Departure" from In Search of the Lost Chord
- 1968: "The Word" from In Search of the Lost Chord
- 1969: "In the Beginning" from On the Threshold of a Dream
- 1969: "The Dream" from On the Threshold of a Dream
- 1969: "Higher and Higher" from To Our Children's Children's Children
- 1969: "Beyond" from To Our Children's Children's Children
- 1970: "Don't You Feel Small" from A Question of Balance
- 1970: "The Balance" (with Ray Thomas) from A Question of Balance
- 1971: "Procession" (with Justin Hayward, John Lodge, Mike Pinder and Ray Thomas) from Every Good Boy Deserves Favour
- 1971: "After You Came" from Every Good Boy Deserves Favour
- 1972: "You and Me" (with Justin Hayward) from Seventh Sojourn
- 1978: "I'll Be Level With You" from Octave
- 1981: "22,000 Days" from Long Distance Voyager
- 1983: "Going Nowhere" from The Present
- 1986: "The Spirit" (with Patrick Moraz) from The Other Side of Life
- 1999: "Nothing Changes" from Strange Times

=== The Graeme Edge Band ===
- 1974: "We Like To Do it" - non-album single (later added to CD of Kick Off Your Muddy Boots)
- 1975: "Lost in Space" from Kick Off Your Muddy Boots
- 1975: "Have You Ever Wondered" from Kick Off Your Muddy Boots
- 1975: "The Tunnel" (with Adrian Gurvitz, & Paul Gurvitz) from Kick Off Your Muddy Boots
- 1975: "Somethin' We'd Like To Say" from Kick Off Your Muddy Boots
- 1977: "Paradise Ballroom" (with Adrian Gurvitz) from Paradise Ballroom
- 1977: "Human" (with Adrian Gurvitz) from Paradise Ballroom
- 1977: "Everybody Needs Somebody" (with Adrian Gurvitz) from Paradise Ballroom
- 1977: "Be My Eyes" (with Adrian Gurvitz) - "B" side to "Everybody Needs Somebody" single (later added to CD of Paradise Ballroom)
- 1977: "All Is Fair" (with Adrian Gurvitz) from Paradise Ballroom
- 1977: "Down, Down, Down" (with Adrian Gurvitz) from Paradise Ballroom
- 1977: "In the Light of the Light" (with Adrian Gurvitz) from Paradise Ballroom
- 1977: "Caroline" (with Adrian Gurvitz) from Paradise Ballroom
