= The Moody Blues discography =

- Studio albums: 16
- Extended plays: 1
- Live albums: 8
- Compilation albums: 27
- Singles: 36
- Video albums: 7

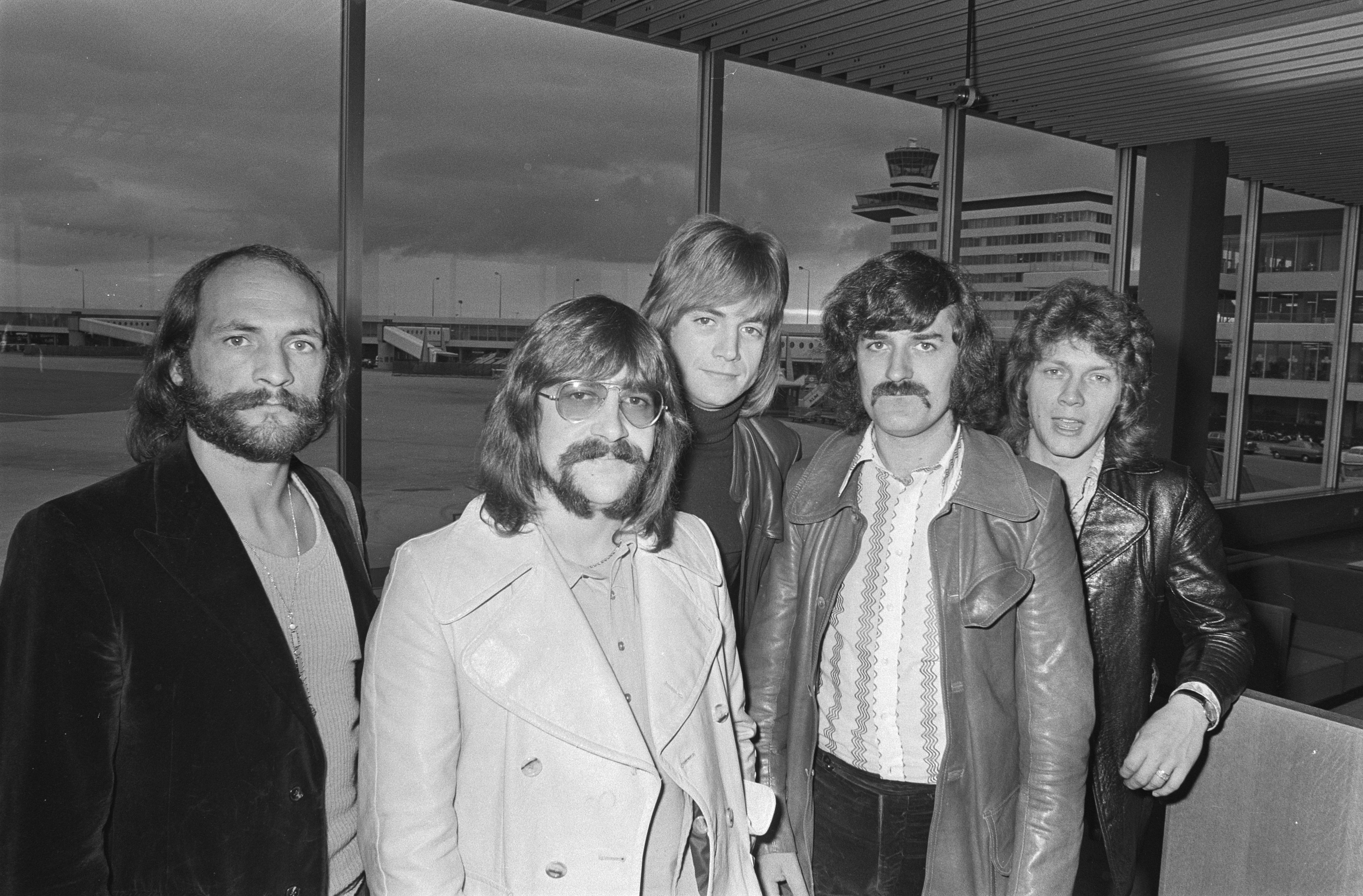
The Moody Blues at Amsterdam Airport Schiphol in 1970. From left to right: Mike Pinder, Graeme Edge, Justin Hayward, Ray Thomas, John Lodge.

The following is the discography of the English symphonic and progressive rock band the Moody Blues. In the United States, 14 of the group's albums reached Gold or Platinum status, according to the Recording Industry Association of America. In Canada, it was 13 albums and in the United Kingdom, it was four.

The Moody Blues scored seven top-ten singles in Canada and three top-ten singles on the Billboard Hot 100, with "Nights in White Satin" reaching number 2 in Billboard and number 1 in Cashbox. On the UK singles chart, the group also had three top-ten hits, with "Go Now" reaching number 1.

== Albums ==
=== Studio albums ===
Album details	UK	AUS	CAN	GER	NLD	NZ	NOR	SWE	US	Certifications
The Magnificent Moodies (NA title: Go Now: The Moody Blues #1): Released: 23 July 1965; Label: Decca (UK), London (NA); Format: LP	—	—	—	—	—	—	—	—	—	
Days of Future Passed: Released: 10 November 1967; Label: Deram; Format: LP	27	10	3	—	—	—	—	—	3	UK: Silver; CAN: Platinum; US: Platinum
In Search of the Lost Chord: Released: 26 July 1968; Label: Deram; Format: LP	5	—	37	30	—	—	—	—	23	UK: Silver; CAN: Platinum; US: Gold
On the Threshold of a Dream: Released: 25 April 1969; Label: Deram; Format: LP	1	—	26	37	—	—	12	—	20	UK: Silver; CAN: Platinum; US: Platinum
To Our Children's Children's Children: Released: 21 November 1969; Label: Threshold; Format: LP	2	—	11	—	—	—	—	—	14	CAN: Platinum; US: Gold
A Question of Balance: Released: 7 August 1970; Label: Threshold; Format: LP	1	2	3	—	8	—	5	—	3	CAN: Platinum; US: Platinum
Every Good Boy Deserves Favour: Released: 23 July 1971; Label: Threshold; Format: LP	1	5	2	44	6	—	5	—	2	CAN: Platinum; US: Gold
Seventh Sojourn: Released: 23 October 1972; Label: Threshold; Format: LP	5	2	1	38	7	—	10	—	1	CAN: Platinum; US: Gold
Octave: Released: 9 June 1978; Label: Decca (UK), London (NA); Format: LP	6	—	9	15	7	14	9	12	13	UK: Gold; CAN: Platinum; US: Platinum
Long Distance Voyager: Released: 15 May 1981; Label: Threshold; Format: LP	7	7	1	28	16	8	12	46	1	UK: Silver; CAN: 3× Platinum; US: Platinum
The Present: Released: 2 September 1983; Label: Threshold; Format: LP, CD	15	—	11	33	26	26	14	35	26	CAN: Gold
The Other Side of Life: Released: 21 April 1986; Label: Polydor; Format: LP, CD	24	34	46	56	65	—	—	—	9	CAN: Platinum; US: Platinum
Sur la Mer: Released: 13 June 1988; Label: Polydor; Format: LP, CD	21	35	35	—	—	—	—	—	38	CAN: Gold
Keys of the Kingdom: Released: 1 July 1991; Label: Polydor; Format: LP, CD	54	—	29	—	67	—	—	—	94	
Strange Times: Released: 17 August 1999; Label: Universal; Format: CD	92	—	—	—	—	—	—	—	93	
December: Released: 28 October 2003; Label: Universal; Format: CD	—	—	—	—	—	—	—	—	—	
"—" denotes releases that did not chart.

=== Live albums ===
Recorded	Album details	US	Certifications
12 December 1969 + 5 studio tracks 1967–1968	Caught Live + 5: Released: 30 April 1977; Label: Decca (UK), London (NA); Format: double LP	26	
9 September 1992	A Night at Red Rocks with the Colorado Symphony Orchestra: Released: 9 March 1993; Label: Polydor; Format: CD	93	US: Gold
1 May 2000	Hall of Fame: Released: 8 August 2000; Label: Universal (UK), Ark 21 (US); Format: CD	185	
11 June 2005	Lovely to See You: Live: Released: 15 November 2005; Label: Image Entertainment; Format: double CD	—	
1967–1970	Live at the BBC 1967–1970: Released: 26 March 2007; Label: Universal; Format: double CD	—	
30 August 1970	Live at the Isle of Wight Festival 1970: Released: 6 July 2008; Label: Eagle; Format: double LP, CD	—	
6–7 June 2017	Days of Future Passed Live: Released: 23 March 2018; Label: Eagle; Format: double LP, double CD	—	
3 July 1991	Live at Montreux 1991: Released: 21 June 2021; Label: Eagle; Format: CD + DVD	—	
"—" denotes releases that did not chart.

=== Compilation albums ===
Album details	UK	CAN	US	Certifications
This Is The Moody Blues: Released: 8 October 1974; Label: Threshold; Format: double LP	14	2	11	UK: Gold; US: Gold; CAN: Platinum
Out of This World: Released: 22 October 1979; Label: K-tel; Format: LP	15	—	—	UK: Gold
Voices in the Sky: The Best of The Moody Blues: Released: 21 November 1984; Label: Threshold; Format: LP, CD	—	91	132	
Prelude: Released: 26 October 1987; Label: London; Format: CD	—	—	—	
Blue: Released: 22 July 1989; Label: Pickwick; Format: LP, CD	—	—	—	
Greatest Hits: Released: 21 November 1989; Label: Polydor; Format: LP, CD	71	—	113	US: Gold
Legend of a Band: The Story of the Moody Blues: Released: 21 November 1990; Label: Polydor; Format: CD	—	—	—	
Time Traveller: Released: 27 September 1994; Label: Polydor; Format: CD box set	—	—	—	US: Gold
The Very Best of The Moody Blues (NA title: The Best of The Moody Blues): Released: 23 September 1996; Label: Polydor; Format: CD	13	—	—	UK: Platinum
Anthology: Released: 20 October 1998; Label: Polydor; Format: double CD	—	—	—	
Classic Moody Blues: Released: 27 December 1999; Label: Universal; Format: CD	—	—	—	
The Best of The Moody Blues: 20th Century Masters: The Millennium Collection: Released: 7 March 2000; Label: PolyGram; Format: CD	—	—	—	
The Very Best of The Moody Blues / Strange Times: The Very Best of... (1996) and Strange Times (1999) repackaged together; Released: April 2000; Label: Universal; Format: double CD	19	—	—	
The Singles +: Released: 17 November 2000; Label: BR Music; Format: double CD	—	—	—	
The Collection: Released: 13 April 2001; Label: Universal; Format: double CD	—	—	—	
The Very Best of The Moody Blues / Hall of Fame: The Very Best of... (1996) and Hall of Fame (2000) repackaged together; Released: 4 June 2002; Label: Universal; Format: double CD	—	—	—	
Say It with Love: Released: 14 January 2003; Label: Polydor; Format: CD	—	—	—	
Ballads: Released: 28 October 2003; Label: Universal; Format: CD	—	—	—	
Ballads / December: Ballads and December (both 2003) repackaged together; Released: 17 November 2003; Label: Universal; Format: double CD	—	—	—	
Gold: Released: 1 March 2005; Label: Polydor; Format: double CD	—	—	—	
An Introduction to The Moody Blues: Released: 29 August 2006; Label: Fuel; Format: CD	—	—	—	
The Moody Blues Collected: Released: 27 February 2007; Label: Universal; Format: triple CD	—	—	—	
Playlist Plus: Released: 29 April 2008; Label: Polydor; Format: triple CD	—	—	—	
Icon: Released 11 August 2011; Label: Polydor; Format: double CD	—	—	—	
Timeless Flight: Released: 3 June 2013; Label: Universal; Format: double CD, CD box set, CD + DVD box set	—	—	—	
The Polydor Years 1986–1992: Released: 24 November 2014; Label: Polydor; Format: CD + DVD box set	—	—	—	
Nights In White Satin: The Essential Moody Blues: Released: 26 May 2017; Label: Spectrum; Format: triple CD	—	—	—	
"—" denotes releases that did not chart.

=== Video albums ===
Album details	Certifications
Legend of a Band: The Story of The Moody Blues: Released: 18 February 1991; Label: PolyGram Video; Format: VHS
A Night at Red Rocks with the Colorado Symphony Orchestra: Released: 16 March 1993; Label: PolyGram Video; Format: VHS	US: Gold
Hall of Fame: Released: 14 November 2000; Label: Image Entertainment; Format: VHS, DVD	AUS: Platinum
Live at Montreux 1991: Released: 31 May 2005; Label: Eagle; Format: DVD	US: Gold
Lovely to See You: Live: Released: 15 November 2005; Label: Image Entertainment; Format: DVD	
Live at the Isle of Wight Festival 1970: Released: 6 July 2008; Label: Eagle; Format: DVD	
Days of Future Passed Live: Released: 23 March 2018; Label: Eagle; Format: DVD	

== EPs ==
EP details	UK
The Moody Blues: Released: April 1965; Label: Decca; Format: EP	12

== Singles ==
Year	Titles Both sides from same album except where indicated	UK	AUS	CAN	NLD	US Hot	US CB	US AC	US MR	Album
1964	"Steal Your Heart Away" b/w "Lose Your Money (But Don't Lose Your Mind)"	—	—	—	—	—	—	—	—	Non-album tracks
1964	"Go Now" b/w "It's Easy Child"	1	12	2	10	10	6	—	—	UK: A-side on The Magnificent Moodies/B-side non-album track US: Go Now: The Moody Blues #1
1965	"Go Now" b/w "Lose Your Money"	1	12	2	10	10	6	—	—	UK: A-side on The Magnificent Moodies/B-side non-album track NA: A-side on Go Now: The Moody Blues #1/B-side non-album track
1965	"I Don't Want to Go On Without You" b/w "Time Is on My Side"	33	—	—	—	—	—	—	—	UK: Non-album tracks US: A-side on Go Now: The Moody Blues #1/B-side non-album track
1965	"From the Bottom of My Heart (I Love You)" b/w "And My Baby's Gone"	22	—	23	—	93	70	—	—	UK: Non-album tracks NA: Go Now: The Moody Blues #1
1965	"Everyday" b/w "You Don't"	44	—	—	—	—	—	—	—	Non-album tracks
1966	"Stop!" b/w "Bye Bye Bird"	—	—	88	—	98	93	—	—	UK: The Magnificent Moodies NA: A-side non-album track/B-side on Go Now: The Moody Blues #1
1966	"This Is My House (But Nobody Calls)" b/w "Boulevard de la Madeleine"	—	—	—	—	119	—	—	—	Non-album tracks
1967	"Life's Not Life" b/w "He Can Win"	—	—	—	—	—	—	—	—	Non-album tracks
1967	"Fly Me High" b/w "I Really Haven't Got the Time"	—	—	—	—	—	—	—	—	Non-album tracks
1967	"Love and Beauty" b/w "Leave This Man Alone"	—	—	—	—	—	—	—	—	Non-album tracks
1967	"Nights in White Satin"^{A} b/w "Cities"	19	—	30	1	103	—	—	—	A-side on Days of Future Passed/B-side non-album track
1968	"Tuesday Afternoon" b/w "Another Morning"	—	—	12	—	24	26	—	—	Days of Future Passed
1968	"Voices in the Sky" b/w "Dr. Livingstone, I Presume"	27	—	—	—	—	—	—	—	In Search of the Lost Chord
1968	"Ride My See-Saw" b/w "A Simple Game"	42	—	33	12	61	41	—	—	A-side on In Search of the Lost Chord/B-side non-album track
1969	"Never Comes the Day" b/w "So Deep Within You"	—	—	74	—	91	90	—	—	On the Threshold of a Dream
1969	"Watching and Waiting" b/w "Out and In"	—	—	—	—	—	—	—	—	To Our Children's Children's Children
1970	"Question" b/w "Candle of Life"	2	36	8	1	21	19	—	—	A-side on A Question of Balance/B-side on To Our Children's Children's Children
1971	"The Story in Your Eyes" b/w "Melancholy Man"	—	68	7	11	23	14	—	—	A-side on Every Good Boy Deserves Favour/B-side on A Question of Balance
1972	"Isn't Life Strange" b/w "After You Came"	13	39	9	—	29	20	—	—	A-side on Seventh Sojourn/B-side on Every Good Boy Deserves Favour
1972	"Nights in White Satin"^{A} b/w "Cities"	9	8	1	—	2	1	37	—	A-side on Days of Future Passed/B-side non-album track
1973	"I'm Just a Singer (In a Rock and Roll Band)" b/w "For My Lady"	36	39	16	4	12	8	—	—	Seventh Sojourn
1978	"Steppin' in a Slide Zone" b/w "I'll Be Level with You"	—	78	41	—	39	46	—	—	Octave
1978	"Driftwood" b/w "I'm Your Man"	—	—	60	—	59	68	38	—	Octave
1981	"Gemini Dream" b/w "Painted Smile"	—	36	1	—	12	13	—	13	Long Distance Voyager
1981	"The Voice" b/w "22,000 Days"	—	91	9	46	15	15	16	1	Long Distance Voyager
1981	"Talking Out of Turn" b/w "Veteran Cosmic Rocker"	—	—	27	—	65	60	—	—	Long Distance Voyager
1983	"Blue World" b/w "Going Nowhere" (UK), "Sorry" (NA)	35	—	40	—	62	72	—	32	The Present
1983	"Sitting at the Wheel" b/w "Sorry" (UK), "Going Nowhere" (NA)	91	—	18	—	27	30	—	3	The Present
1983	"Running Water" b/w "Under My Feet"	—	—	—	—	—		—	—	The Present
1986	"Your Wildest Dreams" b/w "Talkin' Talkin'"	—	20	55	—	9	10	1	2	The Other Side of Life
1986	"The Other Side of Life" b/w "The Spirit"	—	80	—	—	58	76	18	11	The Other Side of Life
1988	"I Know You're Out There Somewhere" b/w "Miracle"	52	37	15	—	30	40	9	2	Sur la Mer
1988	"Here Comes the Weekend" b/w "River of Endless Love"		—					—	50	Sur la Mer
1988	"No More Lies" b/w "River of Endless Love"	—	—	—	—	—		15	—	Sur la Mer
1991	"Say It with Love" b/w "Lean on Me (Tonight)"	—	—	36	—	—		31	22	Keys of the Kingdom
1991	"Bless the Wings (That Bring You Back)" b/w "Once Is Enough"	—	—	—	—	—		—	—	Keys of the Kingdom
1999	"English Sunset"	—	—	—	—	—		—	—	Strange Times
2003	"December Snow"	—	—	—	—	—		—	—	December
"—" denotes releases that did not chart.

== Notes ==
A:"Nights in White Satin" charted highest in most countries on its 1972 re-release, except in the Netherlands where the original 1967 release charted higher.
