= List of the Moody Blues band members =

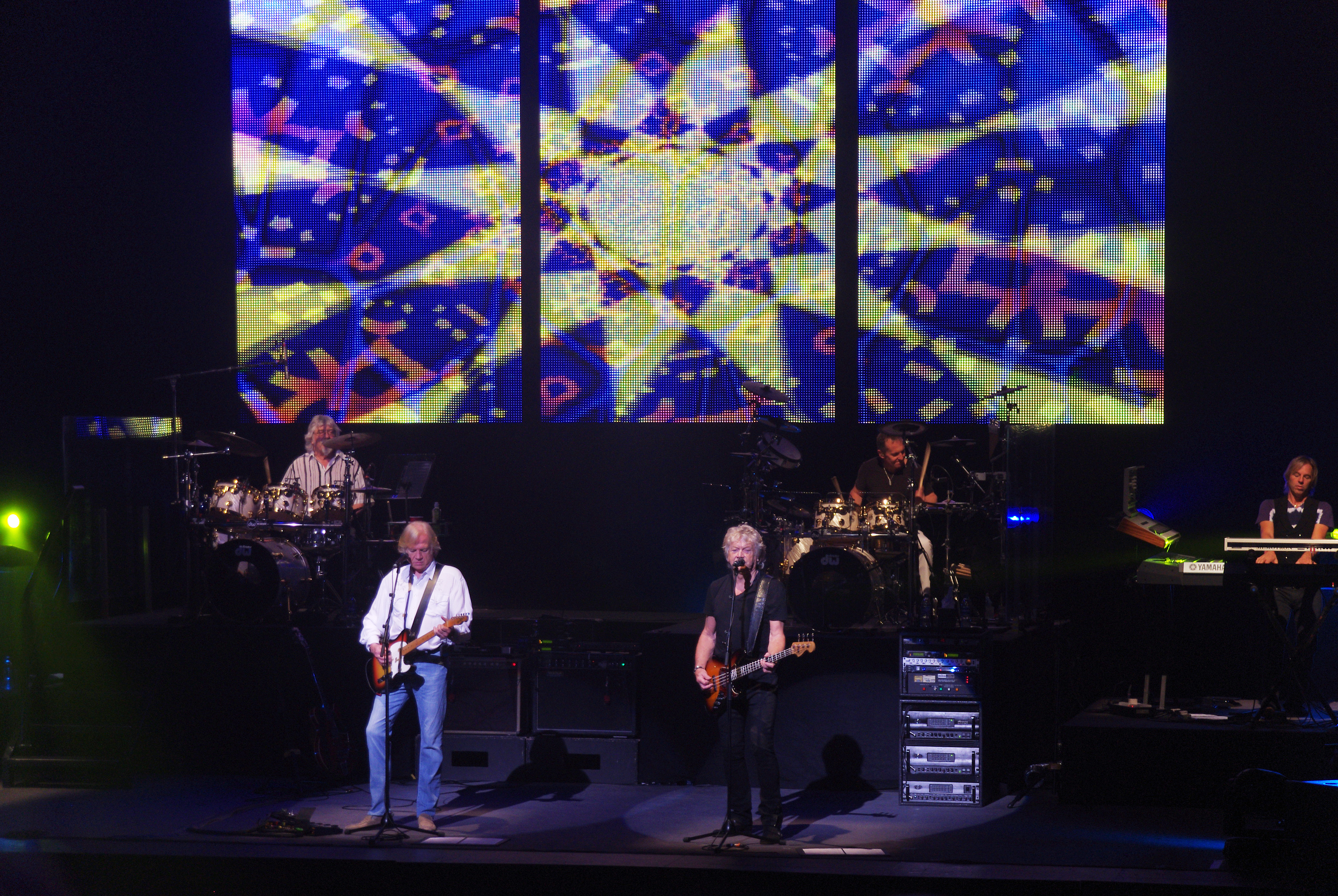
The Moody Blues performing in 2013.

The Moody Blues were an English progressive rock band from Birmingham. Formed in May 1964, the group originally consisted of guitarist and vocalist Denny Laine, keyboardist and vocalist Mike Pinder, woodwind player and vocalist Ray Thomas, bassist Clint Warwick, and drummer Graeme Edge. The band remained active until late 2018, when sole constant member Edge retired from performing, at which point the lineup also included 1966 additions Justin Hayward on guitar and vocals, and John Lodge on bass and vocals. For their final few tours, the core trio were augmented by touring members Norda Mullen on flute, guitar and percussion (from 2003), Julie Ragins on keyboards, guitar, saxophone and percussion (from 2006), Alan Hewitt on keyboards (from 2010), and Billy Ashbaugh on drums and percussion (from 2016).

== History ==
The Moody Blues were formed in May 1964 by Denny Laine, Mike Pinder, Ray Thomas, Clint Warwick and Graeme Edge. The band debuted in September that year with the single "Steal Your Heart Away", which was followed a year later by their first album The Magnificent Moodies. After a few more singles, the group faced its first change in personnel when Warwick left at the end of June 1966, claiming that his role was "keeping him apart from his wife and two small children too much". Rod Clark replaced Warwick for three months, before he and Laine left the Moody Blues at the beginning of October 1966, with Laine going on to pursue a solo career and later joining Wings. Justin Hayward (formerly of Marty Wilde's band) joined on guitar and vocals and John Lodge (an early bandmate of Ray Thomas) joined on bass and vocals.

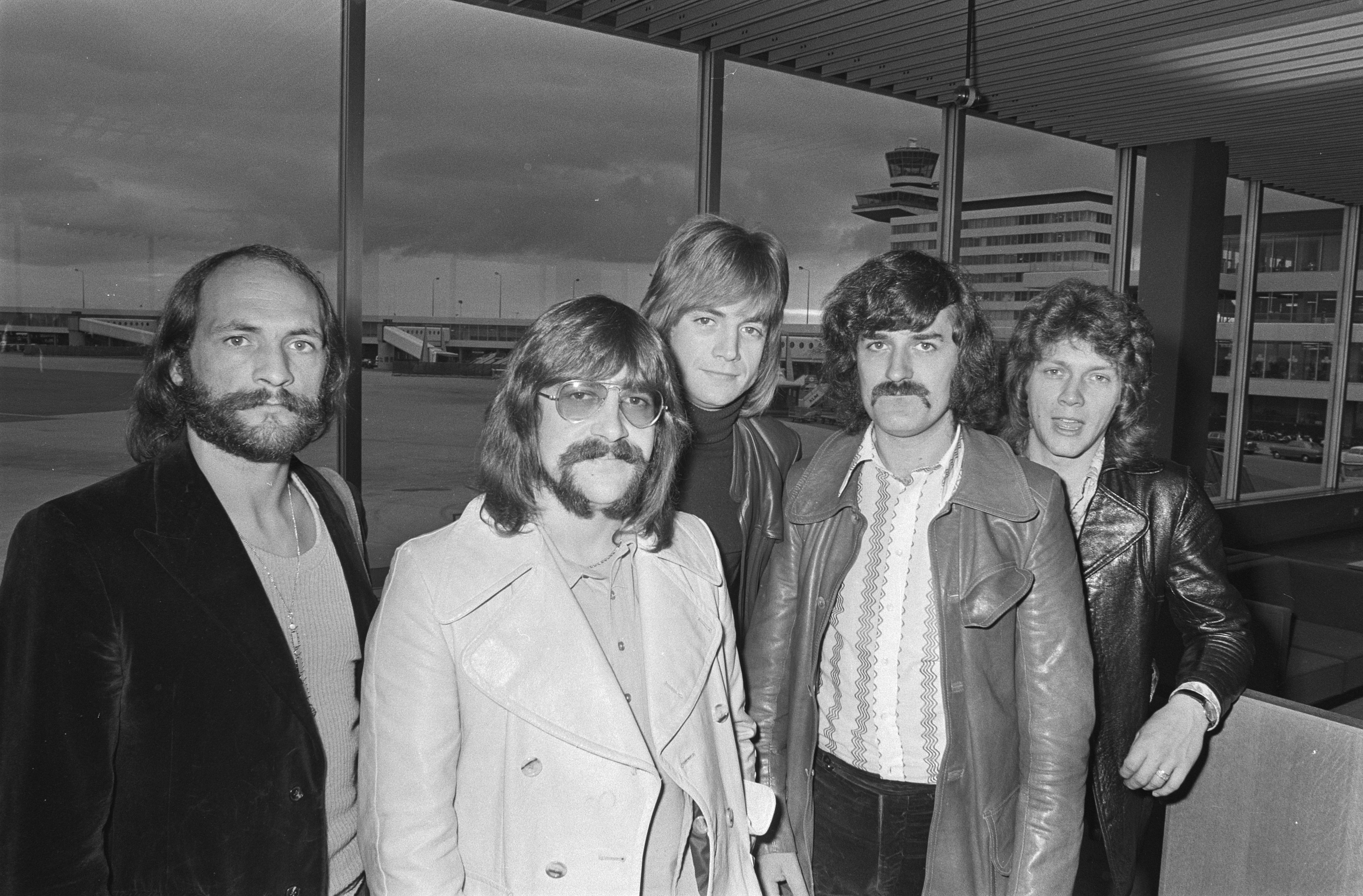
The 'classic' Moody Blues lineup, active from 1966 to 1978, from left to right: Mike Pinder, Graeme Edge, Justin Hayward, Ray Thomas and John Lodge.

The lineup of Hayward, Lodge, Pinder, Thomas and Edge remained stable for twelve years, releasing a string of successful albums including UK number-ones On the Threshold of a Dream (1969), A Question of Balance (1970) and Every Good Boy Deserves Favour (1971). When Pinder refused to tour in promotion of the 1978 release Octave, he was replaced that October by former Yes keyboardist Patrick Moraz. Pinder did not return after the tour, and later took legal action against the remaining members in an attempt to prevent them from releasing 1981's Long Distance Voyager under the Moody Blues name (which was unsuccessful).

Starting in 1986, the Moody Blues began touring with an extended lineup, which initially included second keyboardist Bias Boshell, and backing vocalists Janis Liebhart and Wendy McKenzie. Guy Allison took over from Boshell in 1987, and in 1988 the backing vocalists were replaced by Shaun Murphy and Naomi Starr. By 1990, Boshell had returned on keyboards, and Bekka Bramlett and Terry Wood had taken over backing vocal duties. After the recording of the band's 14th studio albums Keys of the Kingdom in the spring of 1991, Moraz was fired from the band and credited on the release as one of the "additional performers".

Moraz was not replaced in the band's official lineup. Starting with the 1991 tour, Boshell took over as lead keyboardist, Paul Bliss was brought in as backup, and Susan Shattock and June Boyce took over on backing vocals. In 1993, Tracy Graham replaced Boyce. The group's touring lineup remained constant until April 2001, which marked the final appearances of Boshell and Graham. The pair were replaced by keyboardist and backing vocalist Bernie Barlow. In December 2002, Ray Thomas announced that he would be retiring from performing, reducing the band's official lineup to the trio of Hayward, Lodge and Edge.

Thomas was replaced in the Moody Blues touring lineup by flautist and guitarist Norda Mullen. In 2003, the band released Christmas album December. Julie Ragins replaced Barlow in 2006, after initially substituting for the keyboardist late the previous year. Barlow took over for a year in 2009, before Ragins returned from 2010. Also in 2010, Alan Hewitt joined the touring band as their second keyboardist. Billy Ashbaugh replaced Marshall as second live drummer starting in 2016, with Edge primarily playing piano during live shows. Ray Thomas died on 4 January 2018. The group continued touring until Edge retired from performing at the end of 2018, although the possibility of a return was mentioned in interviews by Lodge. On 11 November 2021, however, Edge died, marking the end of the Moody Blues.

In March 2025, former bassist Rod Clark died, followed by John Lodge in October.

== Members ==
=== Official ===
Image	Name	Years active	Instruments	Release contributions
	Graeme Edge	1964–2018 (died 2021)	drums; percussion; backing and spoken vocals; piano	all Moody Blues releases
	Ray Thomas	1964–2002 (died 2018)	flute; harmonica; percussion; keyboards; saxophone; oboe; lead and backing vocals	all Moody Blues releases from "Steal Your Heart Away" (1964) to Hall of Fame (2000) except Sur la Mer (1988); Live at the BBC: 1967–1970 (2007); Live at the Isle of Wight Festival 1970 (2008); Live at the Royal Albert Hall with the World Festival Orchestra (2010); Live at Montreux 1991 (2021)
	Mike Pinder	1964–1978 (died 2024)	keyboards; percussion; acoustic guitar; lead and backing vocals	all Moody Blues releases from "Steal Your Heart Away" (1964) to Octave (1978); Live at the BBC: 1967–1970 (2007); Live at the Isle of Wight Festival 1970 (2008)
	Denny Laine	1964–1966 (died 2023)	guitar; harmonica; lead and backing vocals	all Moody Blues releases from "Steal Your Heart Away" (1964) to "Life's Not Life" (1967)
	Clint Warwick	1964–1966 (died 2004)	bass; backing and lead vocals	all Moody Blues releases from "Steal Your Heart Away" (1964) to "Boulevard de la Madeleine" (1966)
	Rod Clark	1966 (died 2025)	bass; backing vocals	"Life's Not Life" (1967)
	Justin Hayward	1966–2018	guitar; keyboards; percussion; programming; sitar; mandolin; lead and backing vocals	all Moody Blues releases from "Fly Me High" (1967) onwards
	John Lodge	1966–2018 (died 2025)	bass; keyboards; acoustic guitar; cello; lead and backing vocals	all Moody Blues releases from "Fly Me High" (1967) onwards
	Patrick Moraz	1978–1991	keyboards; synthesisers	all Moody Blues releases from Long Distance Voyager (1981) to Keys of the Kingdom (1991)

=== Touring ===
Image	Name	Years active	Instruments	Release contributions
	Janis Liebhart	1986–1987	backing vocals	Video for "Runnin' Out Of Love"
	Wenndy McKenzie	1986–1987	backing vocals	Video for "Runnin' Out Of Love"
	Bias Boshell	1986; 1990–2001	keyboards; guitar	Keys of the Kingdom (1991); A Night at Red Rocks with the Colorado Symphony Orchestra (1993); Hall of Fame (2000); Live at Montreux 1991 (2021)
	Guy Allison	1987–1989	keyboards	none
	Shaun Murphy	1988–1990	backing vocals	none
	Naomi Starr	1988–1990	backing vocals	none
	Bekka Bramlett	1990–1991	backing vocals	none
	Terry Wood	1990–1991	backing vocals	none
	Gordon Marshall	1991–2015	drums; percussion	A Night at Red Rocks with the Colorado Symphony Orchestra (1993); Hall of Fame (2000); Lovely to See You: Live (2005); Live at Montreux 1991 (2021)
	Paul Bliss	1991–2010	keyboards; guitar	Keys of the Kingdom (1991); A Night at Red Rocks with the Colorado Symphony Orchestra (1993); Hall of Fame (2000); Lovely to See You: Live (2005); Live at Montreux 1991 (2021)
	Susan Shattock	1991–2000	backing vocals	A Night at Red Rocks with the Colorado Symphony Orchestra (1993); Live at Montreux 1991 (2021)
	June Boyce	1991–1993	backing vocals	A Night at Red Rocks with the Colorado Symphony Orchestra (1993); Live at Montreux 1991 (2021)
	Tracy Graham	1993–2001	backing vocals	Hall of Fame (2000)
	Bernie Barlow	2001–2006; 2009–2010	keyboards; backing vocals	Lovely to See You: Live (2005)
	Norda Mullen	2003–2018	flute; guitar; percussion; backing vocals	December (2003); Lovely to See You: Live (2005); Days of Future Passed Live (2018)
	Julie Ragins	2006–2009; 2010–2018	keyboards; percussion; guitar; saxophone; backing vocals	Days of Future Passed Live (2018)
	Alan Hewitt	2010–2018	keyboards; backing vocals	Days of Future Passed Live (2018)
	Billy Ashbaugh	2016–2018	drums; percussion	Days of Future Passed Live (2018)

== Timelines ==
Official members

Touring members

== Lineups ==
Period	Members	Releases
May 1964 – July 1966	Graeme Edge – drums; Ray Thomas – vocals, flute, harmonica, percussion; Mike Pinder – keyboards, vocals; Denny Laine – vocals, guitar, harmonica; Clint Warwick – bass, vocals	"Steal Your Heart Away" (1964); The Magnificent Moodies (1965); Go Now: The Moody Blues #1 (1965); "Everyday" (1965); "Boulevard de la Madeleine" (1966)
July – October 1966	Graeme Edge – drums; Ray Thomas – vocals, flute, harmonica; Mike Pinder – vocals, keyboards, percussion; Denny Laine – vocals, guitar, harmonica; Rod Clark – bass, backing vocals	"Life's Not Life" (1967)
October 1966 – October 1978 (Note: Band was on hiatus during March 1974 – September 1977)	Graeme Edge – drums, percussion, vocals; Ray Thomas – vocals, flute, harmonica; Mike Pinder – vocals, keyboards, percussion; Justin Hayward – vocals, guitar, keyboards; John Lodge – vocals, bass, guitar	"Fly Me High" (1967); "Love and Beauty" (1967); Days of Future Passed (1967); In Search of the Lost Chord (1968); On the Threshold of a Dream (1969); To Our Children's Children's Children (1969); A Question of Balance (1970); Every Good Boy Deserves Favour (1971); Seventh Sojourn (1972); Caught Live + 5 (1977); Octave (1978); Live at the BBC: 1967–1970 (2007); Live at the Isle of Wight Festival 1970 (2008)
October 1978 – May 1991	Graeme Edge – drums, percussion, vocals; Ray Thomas – vocals, flute, harmonica; Justin Hayward – vocals, guitar, keyboards; John Lodge – vocals, bass, guitar; Patrick Moraz – keyboards, synthesisers	Long Distance Voyager (1981); The Present (1983); The Other Side of Life (1986); Sur la Mer (1988); Keys of the Kingdom (1991)
May 1991 – December 2002	Graeme Edge – drums, percussion, vocals; Ray Thomas – vocals, flute, harmonica; Justin Hayward – vocals, guitar, keyboards; John Lodge – vocals, bass, guitar	A Night at Red Rocks with the Colorado Symphony Orchestra (1993); Strange Times (1999); Hall of Fame (2000); Live at Montreux 1991 (2021)
December 2002 – November 2018	Graeme Edge – drums, percussion, vocals; Justin Hayward – vocals, guitar, keyboards; John Lodge – vocals, bass, guitar	December (2003); Lovely to See You: Live (2005); Days of Future Passed Live (2018)
