= Moody Bluegrass =

Set of bluegrass tribute albums

Moody Bluegrass: A Nashville Tribute to the Moody Blues

Studio album by Moody Bluegrass
- Released: September 28, 2004
- Recorded: Nashville, Tennessee, US
- Genre: Bluegrass
- Length: 48:31
- Label: Rounder Records
- Producer: David Harvey

Moody Bluegrass chronology
Moody Bluegrass: A Nashville Tribute to the Moody Blues (2004)	Moody Bluegrass TWO...Much Love (2011)

Moody Bluegrass TWO...Much Love

Studio album by Moody Bluegrass
- Released: June 21, 2011
- Recorded: Nashville, USA
- Genre: Bluegrass music
- Length: 1:06:11
- Label: Bunny Rae Records
- Producer: David Harvey

Moody Bluegrass chronology
Moody Bluegrass: A Nashville Tribute to the Moody Blues (2004)	Moody Bluegrass TWO...Much Love (2011)

Moody Bluegrass is an American bluegrass music project that produced two tribute albums to the English rock band the Moody Blues. The albums consist of bluegrass-style cover versions of Moody Blues songs performed by a variety of noted bluegrass and country music artists.

== Albums ==
=== Moody Bluegrass: A Nashville Tribute to the Moody Blues ===
The first album, Moody Bluegrass: A Nashville Tribute to the Moody Blues, was conceived by Randey Faulkner and produced by bluegrass musician and luthier David Harvey. The album, released September 28, 2004 by Rounder Records, included performances by Alison Krauss, Harley Allen, John Cowan, Sam Bush, Tim O'Brien, and Harvey himself, among others. A live concert based the album was performed at Nashville's Ryman Auditorium on October 23, 2005.

=== Moody Bluegrass TWO...Much Love ===
A follow-up album, Moody Bluegrass TWO… Much Love, was released on June 21, 2011, by Bunny Rae Records. The second album includes performances by Vince Gill and Ricky Skaggs in addition to many of the performers of the original album. Members of the Moody Blues themselves contributed to some of the tracks, with Justin Hayward, John Lodge, and Graeme Edge providing lead vocals on one song each, as well as Ray Thomas and Mike Pinder providing some instrumentals. The album ends with an original instrumental composition, "Lost Chord", which is a tribute to the album In Search of the Lost Chord (1968).

The track of the bluegrass cover of "It's Cold Outside Of Your Heart" from Moody Bluegrass TWO...Much Love was also released on Hayward's solo album Spirits of the Western Sky (2013).

=== Compilation album ===
A compilation of the two tribute albums, also titled Moody Bluegrass: A Nashville Tribute to the Moody Blues, was released October 29, 2013 by Red River Entertainment.

== Reception ==
Critics praised both releases for their craftsmanship and serious treatment of the material.

For AllMusic, James Christopher Monger wrote of the first album: "With all of the other countless tongue-in-cheek bluegrass renderings of classic rock radio staples, it's hard not to toss off producer/mandolin player David Harvey's irony-free reimagining of the Moody Blues' greatest hits…[however] what was once an exercise in high camp turns into a lovingly crafted tribute that's as reverent as it is whimsical."

For the second album, Jim Burn on folkalley.com wrote, "Harvey has once again sparked conversation with these arrangements, but pulls them off with such class that any suggestion of novelty instantly disappears once you listen. He adds vocal harmony (The Settles Connection) and strings at the right moments, but mostly lets his cast of stars deliver."

== Track listings ==
The following listed tracks include lead singers / performers.

=== Moody Bluegrass: A Nashville Tribute to Moody Blues (2004) ===
1. "Lovely to See You" – Harley Allen
2. "Land Of Make Believe" – Tim O'Brien / Alison Krauss
3. "The Voice" – John Cowan
4. "The Other Side Of Life" – Larry Cordle
5. "It's Up To You" – Jan Harvey
6. "Ride My See-Saw" – Harley Allen
7. "I'm Just a Singer (In a Rock and Roll Band)" – John Cowan
8. "Legend of a Mind" – Tim O'Brien
9. "Your Wildest Dreams" – Harley Allen
10. "Nights In White Satin" – John Cowan
11. "Late Lament" – Larry Cordle
12. "Never Comes the Day" – John Cowan

=== Moody Bluegrass TWO… Much Love (2011) ===
1. "I Know You're Out There Somewhere" – Vince Gill
2. "Nice to Be Here" – Sam Bush
3. "Dear Diary" – Tim O'Brien, with Ray Thomas on Flute and Mike Pinder on Mellotron
4. "Meanwhile" – Harley Allen
5. "Dawn Is a Feeling" – Peter Rowan
6. "It's Cold Outside of Your Heart" – Justin Hayward
7. "You and Me" – Ricky Skaggs
8. "Say It With Love" – Jan Harvey
9. "Send Me No Wine" – John Lodge
10. "The Story In Your Eyes" – Ronnie Bowman
11. "Voices in the Sky" – Emma Harvey
12. "Have You Heard" – Larry Cordle
13. "Higher and Higher" – Graeme Edge
14. "Tuesday Afternoon" – John Cowan
15. "Highway" – Jon Randall
16. "Lost Chord" – David Harvey & Tim May
