= Anthology (The Moody Blues album) =

Compilation album by The Moody Blues
- Released: 20 October 1998
- Recorded: 1964 – 1991
- Genre: Rock
- Length: 129:00
- Label: Polydor
- Producer: Various

The Moody Blues chronology
The Best of the Moody Blues (1997)	Anthology (1998)	Strange Times (1999)

Anthology is a compilation album by the progressive rock band The Moody Blues. It was released in the US on 20 October 1998. It was not released in the UK until 2001 under the title The Collection with different artwork but with the same tracks as the US release.

AllMusic noted about the album, "Those buying this set will be assured of hearing 99 percent of the Moody Blues' tracks ever heard on the radio, but there is still a flaw in the programming."

== Track listing ==
All songs written by Justin Hayward and performed by the Moody Blues, except where noted.

=== Disc one ===
1. "Go Now" (Larry Banks, Milton Bennett) – 3:10
2. "Tuesday Afternoon (Forever Afternoon)" – 4:48
3. "The Night: Nights in White Satin/Late Lament" (Hayward, Graeme Edge, Peter Knight) – 7:38 (5:38/2:00)
4. "Ride My See-Saw" (John Lodge) – 3:42
5. "Legend of a Mind" (Ray Thomas) – 6:37
6. "Voices in the Sky" – 3:29
7. "Lovely to See You" – 2:37
8. "Never Comes the Day" – 4:40
9. "Gypsy (Of a Strange and Distant Time)" – 3:33
10. "Candle of Life" (Lodge) – 4:12
11. "Watching and Waiting" (Hayward, Thomas) – 4:14
12. "Question" – 5:43
13. "Melancholy Man" (Mike Pinder) – 5:45
14. "The Story in Your Eyes" – 3:05
15. "Lost in a Lost World" (Pinder) – 4:41
16. "Isn't Life Strange" (Lodge) – 6:08
17. "I'm Just a Singer (In a Rock and Roll Band)" (Lodge) – 4:17

=== Disc two ===
1. "Remember Me (My Friend)" (by Justin Hayward & John Lodge) (Hayward, Lodge) – 5:24
2. "Blue Guitar" (by Justin Hayward & John Lodge with 10cc) – 3:37
3. "Steppin' in a Slide Zone" (Edited version) (Lodge) – 5:05
4. "Driftwood" (Edited version) – 4:24
5. "Forever Autumn" (Edited version) (by Justin Hayward and Jeff Wayne) (Jeff Wayne, Paul Vigrass, Gary Osborne) – 4:30
6. "The Voice" – 5:13
7. "Talking Out of Turn" (Single edit) (Lodge) – 4:56
8. "Gemini Dream" (Hayward, Lodge) – 4:04
9. "Blue World" – 5:10
10. "Sitting at the Wheel" (Lodge) – 5:35
11. "Your Wildest Dreams" – 4:50
12. "The Other Side of Life" – 6:50
13. "I Know You're Out There Somewhere" – 6:36
14. "Say It with Love" – 3:56
15. "Bless the Wings (That Bring You Back)" – 4:00
16. "Highway" (Hayward, Lodge) — 4:35

== Personnel ==
=== The Moody Blues ===
- Graeme Edge – acoustic and electric drums, percussion, maracas, tabla, cymbals, handclaps, backing vocal (except on 2/1, 2/2 and 2/5)
- Justin Hayward – lead and backing vocals, guitars, mellotron, handclaps (except on 1/1)
- Denny Laine – lead vocals, guitar (on 1/1)
- John Lodge – bass guitar, handclaps, lead and backing vocals (except on 1/1)
- Patrick Moraz – keyboards, piano, mellotron, Oberheim custom dual-manual 8-voice synthesizer, Yamaha CS-80, Roland Jupiter-8, Minimoog, Polymoog, vocoder (on disc 2 tracks 5–16)
- Mike Pinder – keyboards, piano, mellotron, Chamberlin, synthesizers, harmonium, gong, acoustic guitar, handclaps, lead and backing vocals, spoken word (on all disc 1 tracks, 2/3 and 2/4)
- Ray Thomas – flute, tambourine, harmonica, handclaps, lead and backing vocals (except on 2/1, 2/2, 2/5, 2/11 and 2/12)
- Clint Warwick – bass guitar, backing vocal (on 1/1)

=== Additional personnel ===
- Paul Bliss – keyboards and drum programming on "Say It with Love"
- Richard Burton – spoken word on "Forever Autumn"
- Jim Cockey – violin and French horn on "Remember Me, My Friend"
- Lol Creme – slide guitar and backing vocals on "Blue Guitar"
- Graham Deakin – drums and percussion on "Remember Me, My Friend"
- Kirk Duncan – piano on "Remember Me, My Friend"
- Herbie Flowers – bass guitar on "Forever Autumn"
- Ken Freeman – keyboards and synthesizers on "Forever Autumn"
- Kevin Godley – drums, percussion and backing vocals on "Blue Guitar"
- Graham Gouldman – acoustic guitar and backing vocals on "Blue Guitar"
- Peter Knight conducting the London Festival Orchestra – orchestral arrangements on "Tuesday Afternoon (Forever Afternoon)" and "Nights in White Satin/Late Lament"
- R.A. Martin – horns and alto saxophone on "Driftwood"
- Barry Morgan – drums and percussion on "Forever Autumn"
- Jo Partridge – guitars on "Forever Autumn"
- Chris Spedding – electric and acoustic guitars on "Forever Autumn"
- Eric Stewart – guitars and backing vocals on "Blue Guitar"
- Tim Tompkins – cello on "Remember Me, My Friend"
- Tom Tompkins – viola on "Remember Me, My Friend"
- Jeff Wayne – keyboards and synthesizers on "Forever Autumn"
