= This Is The Moody Blues =

Compilation album by the Moody Blues
- Released: 25 October 1974
- Recorded: 8 October 1967 – 15 August 1972
- Genres: Progressive rock, psychedelic rock
- Length: 94:18
- Label: Threshold
- Producer: Tony Clarke

The Moody Blues chronology
Seventh Sojourn (1972)	This Is The Moody Blues (1974)	Caught Live + 5 (1977)

Professional ratings
Review scores
Source	Rating
AllMusic	4.5/5 stars

This Is The Moody Blues is a two LP (later two CDs) compilation album by the Moody Blues, released in late 1974 while the band was on a self-imposed sabbatical. Though all of the songs were previously released on albums (with the exception of "A Simple Game" which was a 1968 B-side), several of them are heard here in distinctly different mixes. Like the Moody Blues albums of the time – but unlike most compilation albums, including later Moody Blues compilations – the songs on this album segue seamlessly, without silence between tracks. On the original LP, this was true of the songs on each side; when the album was remastered for CD, each disc was also blended, so that "Legend of a Mind" segues into "In the Beginning", and "Watching and Waiting" segues into "I'm Just a Singer (In a Rock and Roll Band)".

The album was the first release to provide a separate name for "Late Lament", the symphonic coda and spoken poem that closes "Nights in White Satin".

This Is The Moody Blues was a commercial and critical success, reaching #14 in the United Kingdom and #11 in the United States.

== Original track listing ==
=== Side One ===
1. "Question" (Justin Hayward) (from A Question of Balance, 1970) – 5:39
2. "The Actor" (Hayward) (from In Search of the Lost Chord, 1968) – 4:11
3. "The Word" (Graeme Edge) (spoken poem from In Search of the Lost Chord, remixed over instrumental "Beyond" from To Our Children's Children's Children, 1969) – 0:51
4. "Eyes of a Child" (John Lodge) (from To Our Children's Children's Children) – 2:34
5. "Dear Diary" (Ray Thomas) (from On the Threshold of a Dream, 1969) – 3:56
6. "Legend of a Mind" (Thomas) (from In Search of the Lost Chord) – 6:37

=== Side Two ===
1. "In the Beginning" (Edge) (from On the Threshold of a Dream) – 2:06
2. "Lovely to See You" (Hayward) (from On the Threshold of a Dream) – 2:35
3. "Never Comes the Day" (Hayward) (from On the Threshold of a Dream) – 4:39
4. "Isn't Life Strange" (Edited version) (Lodge) (from Seventh Sojourn, 1972) – 5:32
5. "The Dream" (Edge) (from On the Threshold of a Dream) – 0:52
6. "Have You Heard? (Part 1)" (Mike Pinder) (from On the Threshold of a Dream) – 1:23
7. "The Voyage" (Pinder) (from On the Threshold of a Dream) – 4:08
8. "Have You Heard? (Part 2)" (Pinder) (from On the Threshold of a Dream) – 2:08

=== Side Three ===
1. "Ride My See-Saw" (Lodge) (from In Search of the Lost Chord) – 3:32
2. "Tuesday Afternoon" (Hayward) (from Days of Future Passed, 1967) – 4:04
3. "And the Tide Rushes In" (Thomas) (from A Question of Balance) – 2:54
4. "New Horizons" (Hayward) (from Seventh Sojourn) – 5:06
5. "A Simple Game" (Pinder) (B-side to UK "Ride My See-Saw" single, 1968) – 3:18
6. "Watching and Waiting" (Hayward, Thomas) (from To Our Children's Children's Children) – 4:21

=== Side Four ===
1. "I'm Just a Singer (In a Rock and Roll Band)" (Lodge) (from Seventh Sojourn) – 4:11
2. "For My Lady" (Thomas) (from Seventh Sojourn) – 3:54
3. "The Story in Your Eyes" (Hayward) (from Every Good Boy Deserves Favour, 1971) – 2:45
4. "Melancholy Man" (Pinder) (from A Question of Balance) – 5:05
5. "Nights in White Satin" (Hayward) (from Days of Future Passed) – 4:33
6. "Late Lament" (Edge, Peter Knight) (from Days of Future Passed) – 2:33

== Charts ==
Chart (1974–1975)	Peak position
Canada Top Albums/CDs (RPM)	2
New Zealand Albums (RMNZ)	22
UK Albums (Official Charts)	14
US Billboard 200	11

== Certifications ==
Region	Certification	Certified units/sales
Canada (Music Canada)	Platinum	100,000^{^}
United Kingdom (BPI)	Gold	100,000^{^}
United States (RIAA)	Gold	500,000^{^}
^{^} Shipments figures based on certification alone.
