= Live at the BBC: 1967–1970 =

Live album by The Moody Blues
- Released: 26 March 2007
- Recorded: May 9, 1967 – May 29, 1970
- Venue: BBC
- Genre: Rock, progressive rock
- Length: 133:43
- Label: Deram
- Producer: Tony Clarke

The Moody Blues chronology
An Introduction to The Moody Blues (2006)	Live at the BBC: 1967–1970 (2007)	Live at the Isle of Wight Festival 1970 (2008)

Live at the BBC: 1967–1970 is a two-disc album (three discs for the limited edition LP version) by The Moody Blues. Released in 2007, it features forty-one live recordings of various performances for the BBC between 1967 and 1970. The album features multiple recordings of some songs, so they are listed more than once. In 2019 the album was reissued on a numbered limited edition triple-coloured vinyl disk set.

== Track listing ==
All songs written by Justin Hayward, except where noted.

=== Disc One ===
1. "Fly Me High" – 3:00
2. "Don't Let Me Be Misunderstood" (Bennie Benjamin/Gloria Caldwell/Sol Marcus) – 2:23
3. "Love and Beauty" (Mike Pinder) – 2:12
4. "Leave This Man Alone" – 2:52
5. "Peak Hour" (John Lodge) – 3:21
6. "Nights in White Satin" – 4:22
7. "Fly Me High" – 2:45
8. "Twilight Time" (Ray Thomas) – 2:08
9. "Dr. Livingstone, I Presume" (Thomas) – 2:58
10. "Voices in the Sky" – 2:50
11. "Ride My See-Saw" (Lodge) – 3:49
12. "The Best Way to Travel" (Pinder) – 3:38
13. "Voices in the Sky" – 3:53
14. "Dr. Livingstone, I Presume" (Thomas) – 2:58
15. "Peak Hour"(Lodge) – 3:29
16. "Tuesday Afternoon" – 3:24
17. "Ride My See-Saw" (Lodge) – 2:28
18. "Lovely to See You" – 2:25
19. "Never Comes the Day" – 4:33
20. "To Share Our Love" (Lodge) – 2:21
21. "Send Me No Wine" (Lodge) – 2:40
22. "So Deep Within You" (Pinder) – 3:06
23. "Lovely to See You" – 2:15

=== Disc Two ===
1. "Nights in White Satin" – 4:40
2. "Another Morning" (Thomas) – 2:58
3. "Ride My See-Saw" (Lodge) – 3:46
4. "Dr. Livingstone, I Presume" (Thomas) – 3:01
5. "House of Four Doors" (Lodge) – 5:56
6. "Voices in the Sky" – 3:23
7. "The Best Way to Travel" (Pinder) – 3:22
8. "Visions of Paradise" (Hayward, Thomas) – 1:14
9. "The Actor" – 1:50
10. "Gypsy (Of a Strange and Distant Time)" – 3:07
11. "The Sunset" (Pinder) – 3:47
12. "Never Comes the Day" – 4:21
13. "Are You Sitting Comfortably?" (Hayward, Thomas) – 3:00
14. "The Dream" (Graeme Edge) – 0:52
15. "Have You Heard" (Pinder) – 5:42
16. "Nights in White Satin" – 3:03
17. "Legend of a Mind" (Thomas) – 4:34
18. "Question" – 4:55

=== Personnel ===
- Justin Hayward - vocals, guitar, sitar
- John Lodge - vocals, bass
- Ray Thomas - vocals, flute, percussion
- Graeme Edge - drums, percussion
- Mike Pinder - vocals, mellotron, keyboards

== Charts ==
Triple color vinyl edition
Chart	Peak position	Ref
UK Albums Chart	91	
