= Caught Live + 5 =

Live album by the Moody Blues
- Released: 30 April 1977 (US)
- Recorded: Live: 12 December 1969 at the Royal Albert Hall; Studio: 19 May 1967 – 17 November 1968
- Genre: Psychedelic rock; progressive pop
- Length: 75:32
- Label: Decca (UK); London (US)
- Producer: Tony Clarke

The Moody Blues chronology
This Is The Moody Blues (1974)	Caught Live + 5 (1977)	Octave (1978)

Professional ratings
Review scores
Source	Rating
AllMusic	4/5 stars

Caught Live + 5 is a live album by the Moody Blues, consisting of a 12 December 1969 live show at the Royal Albert Hall and five previously unreleased studio recordings from 1967 to 1968.

== Concert ==
The band's performance was a popular and critical success at the time. In his newspaper review of the event, music critic Jack Scott called the concert a "knockout victory for progressive pop," having a "rich, full sound that combined sensitivity with sheer popular punch."

... [B]eautifully controlled waves of volume kept excitement high ... They're not slaves to volume. Power was used judiciously with splendid effect, producing a clean-cut, undulating sound...

== Release ==
The album was released without the participation of the band, who have been critical of the album. Justin Hayward remembers, "That was a disaster, I thought. I never wanted to release that. We were out of contract when it was released, we didn't have any choice in it. I never liked that record at all. I never liked the Albert Hall as a venue for recording – nice atmosphere and everything, but I can think of much better places to record. A round building is not the best place for rock 'n' roll."

Caught Live is the first Moody Blues album since Days of Future Passed not to feature cover artwork by Philip Travers. Decca Records instead used British art design group Hipgnosis.

The "+5" studio tracks were re-released on their 1987 album Prelude.

The Caught Live tracks were also re-released on the 12th May 2023, as a part of the To Our Children's Children's Children 50th Anniversary Edition Boxset retitled as The Royal Albert Hall Concert - December 1969, also newly mixed by Stephen W Tayler in stereo and 5.1 surround.

== Reception ==
While Caught Live + 5 managed to reach number 26 during its American chart run, it missed the British listings completely, the first time this had occurred for the Moody Blues since their 1965 debut The Magnificent Moodies (although that album had reached number 5 on the NME album chart).

== Track listing ==
Tracks 1–14 are live while tracks 15–19 are studio recordings.

=== Side One ===
1. "Gypsy (Of a Strange and Distant Time)" (Justin Hayward) – 4:03
2. "The Sunset" (Mike Pinder) – 4:33
3. "Dr. Livingstone, I Presume" (Ray Thomas) – 3:23
4. "Never Comes the Day" (Hayward) – 5:39

=== Side Two ===
1. "Peak Hour" (John Lodge) – 5:13
2. "Tuesday Afternoon" (Hayward) – 4:51
3. "Are You Sitting Comfortably?" (Hayward, Thomas) – 4:21
4. "The Dream" (Graeme Edge) – 0:58
5. "Have You Heard (Part 1)" (Pinder) – 1:22
6. "The Voyage" (Pinder) – 3:37
7. "Have You Heard (Part 2)" (Pinder) – 2:33

=== Side Three ===
1. "Nights in White Satin" (Hayward) – 5:55
2. "Legend of a Mind" (Thomas) – 7:05
3. "Ride My See-Saw" (Lodge) – 4:28

=== Side Four ===
1. "Gimme a Little Somethin'" (Lodge) – 3:13 (recorded 17 March 1968)
2. "Please Think About It" (Pinder) – 3:41 (recorded 29 June 1967)
3. "Long Summer Days" (Hayward) – 3:12 (recorded 19 May 1967)
4. "King and Queen" (Hayward) – 3:52 (recorded 13 February 1968)
5. "What Am I Doing Here?" (Hayward) – 3:33 (recorded 17 November 1968)

== Personnel ==
- Justin Hayward – vocals, guitar
- John Lodge – vocals, bass guitar
- Mike Pinder – vocals, Mellotron, piano
- Ray Thomas – vocals, flute, harmonica, tambourine
- Graeme Edge – drums, percussion

== Charts ==
Chart (1977)	Peak position
US Billboard 200	26
