= Live at the Isle of Wight Festival 1970 (The Moody Blues album) =

Live album by The Moody Blues
- Released: 6 July 2008 (UK); 2 August 2008 (US)
- Recorded: 30 August 1970 at the Isle of Wight Festival
- Genre: Art rock, progressive rock
- Length: 64:10
- Label: Eagle
- Producer: Justin Hayward, Alberto Parodi, Danilo Madonia

The Moody Blues chronology
Live at the BBC: 1967-1970 (2007)	Live at the Isle of Wight Festival 1970 (2008)	Days of Future Passed Live (2018)

Professional ratings
Review scores
Source	Rating
Allmusic	3/5 stars

Live at the Isle of Wight Festival 1970 is a live album by the Moody Blues that consists of their live performance at the Isle of Wight Festival in 1970. The album was released in 2008.

== Background ==
The performance finds the group touring behind their 1970 album, A Question of Balance. Bassist John Lodge remembers performing at the festival in a 2020 interview: "It was just an amazing experience. That period of time was just amazing experience, because it was the first time for young people from all over the world getting together for one thing only and that was the Western music. You have to remember in 1970, there was the Cold War, the Iron Curtain. People from Eastern Europe were devoid of listening to Western music, but the Isle of Wight changed all that. We had so many people going to the Isle of Wight to listen to music. It was like the first gathering of young people around the world, all united for one thing: Music."

== Track listing ==
1. "Gypsy (Of a Strange and Distant Time)" (Justin Hayward) – 3:27
2. "The Sunset" (Mike Pinder) – 5:51
3. "Tuesday Afternoon" (Hayward) – 3:25
4. "Minstrel's Song" (John Lodge) – 4:53
5. "Never Comes the Day" (Hayward) – 4:05
6. "Tortoise and the Hare" (Lodge) – 3:56
7. "Question" (Hayward) – 5:21
8. "Melancholy Man" (Pinder) – 5:59
9. "Are You Sitting Comfortably?" (Hayward, Ray Thomas) – 4:00
10. "The Dream" (Graeme Edge) – 0:59
11. "Have You Heard Part. 1" (Pinder) – 1:21
12. "The Voyage" (Pinder) – 3:41
13. "Have You Heard Part. 2" (Pinder) – 2:40
14. "Nights in White Satin" (Hayward) – 6:19
15. "Legend of a Mind" (Thomas) – 7:10
16. "Ride My See Saw" (Lodge) – 4:57

== Personnel ==
- Justin Hayward – vocals, guitars, sitar
- John Lodge – vocals, bass
- Ray Thomas – vocals, flute, tambourine
- Graeme Edge – drums
- Mike Pinder – vocals, mellotron
