= Watching and waiting =

Watching and waiting can mean:

- Watchful waiting, in medicine
- "Watching and Waiting", a 1969 single by the Moody Blues
