= Are You Sitting Comfortably? =

Are You Sitting Comfortably? may refer to:

- Are You Sitting Comfortably? (album), an album by IQ
- "Are You Sitting Comfortably?" (song), a 1969 song by The Moody Blues
- Are you sitting comfortably?, a phrase associated with the BBC radio programme Listen with Mother
