= David Harvey (luthier) =

American musician

David Harvey is an American bluegrass mandolin player and luthier, responsible for the mandolins, banjos, and dobros produced by Gibson.

== Musical career ==
Harvey is the son of Dorsey Harvey, a mandolin player who played with Red Allen and Frank Wakefield; David Harvey grew up playing mandolin, fiddle, and guitar, and is often referred to as a "mandolin virtuoso." At age 14, he started touring with Allen, and in the late seventies became a member of Larry Sparks's The Lonesome Ramblers. In the eighties, he formed The Wild and Blue Band with his wife, Jan, and her sister, Jill Snider, playing bluegrass festivals and recording; they were given the "Best New Band" award by the Society for the Preservation of Bluegrass Music in 1992.

From 2002 to 2007 he toured with Claire Lynch,. In 2004 Harvey produced and played on a tribute to The Moody Blues, Moody Bluegrass: A Nashville Tribute to The Moody Blues, which featured artists like Alison Krauss and John Cowan. He also produced and performed on the follow-on album, Moody Bluegrass TWO... Much Love, released in 2011. In 2004, he performed with Larry Cordle on Murder on Music Row, which spawned the hit single "Murder on Music Row" (recorded by George Strait and Alan Jackson).

== Master Luthier ==
Harvey began learning the trade from John Ramsey, at The Folklore Center in Colorado Springs in the late seventies. In the nineties, having moved to Nashville, Tennessee, he worked at various places including The Violin Shop and National Guitar Repair, run by Charlie Derrington; Derrington took a job with Gibson, and soon asked Harvey to join him.

At Gibson, Harvey was the master luthier who oversaw and approved their production of mandolins, banjos, and dobros until recently retiring in May of 2026. . He is also responsible for the limited edition Jam Master and Master Models, which includes a signature Ricky Skaggs model. David signed more Gibson mandolins than anyone in the history of Gibson.

In late October it was announced at IBMA that he has begun a role with Lafferty Mandolins, the house brand for The Mandolin Store. https://laffertymandolins.com/models
