= Say It with Love =

Single by The Moody Blues

from the album Keys of the Kingdom
- B-side: "Lean on Me (Tonight)"
- Released: 17 June 1991
- Recorded: 1990–1991
- Length: 3:57
- Label: Polydor
- Songwriter(s): Justin Hayward
- Producer(s): Christopher Neil

The Moody Blues singles chronology
"No More Lies" (1988)	"Say It with Love" (1991)	"English Sunset" (1999)

"Say It with Love" is the lead single from The Moody Blues 1991 album Keys of the Kingdom. Written by Justin Hayward, it was released as a single in June 1991, with "Lean on Me (Tonight)" on the B-side. "Say It with Love" was moderately successful, and charted at number 22 on the Mainstream Rock chart in 1991. In Canada, it reached number 36 in the RPM Top 100 Singles and number 28 in the RPM Top 40 AC.

== Chart positions ==
Year	Chart	Position
1991	Canada RPM	36
1991	Canada RPM AC	28
1991	Mainstream Rock Tracks	22
1991	Adult Contemporary	31

== Personnel ==
- Justin Hayward: vocals, electric guitars
- John Lodge: bass guitar, vocals
- Paul Bliss: keyboards, drum programming
