= Tuesday Afternoon =

Single by The Moody Blues

from the album Days of Future Passed
- B-side: "Another Morning"
- Released: 7 January 1968 (UK); 19 July 1968 (US)
- Recorded: 22 October 1967
- Genre: Progressive rock, baroque pop, psychedelic pop, space rock, psychedelic rock, pop rock
- Length: 8:23 (Album version); 2:16 (Single edit); 4:08 (This Is The Moody Blues); 4:52 (Greatest Hits)
- Label: Deram
- Songwriter: Justin Hayward
- Producer: Tony Clarke

The Moody Blues singles chronology
"Nights in White Satin" (1967)	"Tuesday Afternoon" (1968)	"Voices in the Sky" (1968)

Days of Future Passed track listing
- Side one: 1. "The Day Begins: The Day Begins/Morning Glory"; 2. "Dawn: (Intro)/Dawn Is a Feeling"; 3. "The Morning: (Intro)/Another Morning"; 4. "Lunch Break: (Intro)/Peak Hour"; Side two

"Tuesday Afternoon" (sometimes referred to as "Forever Afternoon (Tuesday?)", or simply "Forever Afternoon") is a 1968 single by English symphonic rock band The Moody Blues, which was presented in its original album form on their 1967 album Days of Future Passed in two parts.

== Part one ==
The first part, the one most familiar to listeners, called "Tuesday Afternoon", was originally released on The Moody Blues 1967 album Days of Future Passed, a concept album chronicling a typical day. On the album, it was part one of "The Afternoon" track titled "Forever Afternoon (Tuesday?)". Justin Hayward said that he wrote the song on a Tuesday afternoon in Lydiard Park, in Swindon, in the west of England. Hayward's mother had taken him and his brother to the park while they were growing up, and he revisited the park during the production of Days of Future Passed to write the song.

Justin Hayward wrote the song originally intending to name it "Tuesday Afternoon". At the insistence of producer Tony Clarke, it was named "Forever Afternoon (Tuesday?)" for its release on Days of Future Passed. However, when it was released as a single a year later, its name was changed back to "Tuesday Afternoon", and it has been more commonly known by this name ever since. Some of the Moody Blues compilation and live albums list the song as "Tuesday Afternoon (Forever Afternoon)" to reflect both titles.

"Tuesday Afternoon" was released as a single in 1968, and was the second single from Days of Future Passed (the first being "Nights in White Satin"). It was backed with another Days track, "Another Morning". The single version of "Tuesday Afternoon" was edited down to 2:16, ending before the repeat of the opening riff and "Tuesday afternoon" verse.

According to an interview with Hayward, he wrote "Tuesday Afternoon" while sitting in the middle of a field near his home in England on a beautiful spring afternoon. He claims that he had his acoustic guitar in hand and the song just came to him. The song features Hayward on lead vocals and acoustic guitar. The backing melody comes from the Mellotron, which was played by Mike Pinder. There is also a short flute solo at the end played by Ray Thomas.

On Days of Future Passed, the London Festival Orchestra performs the final orchestral rendition of the chorus. This orchestral link between parts one and two of the song was recorded separately from the Moodys' portions. The link was arranged by Peter Knight, who arranged orchestral sections for the entire album. However, for the single release and subsequent releases on compilation albums, this orchestral finale was not included, and the song simply faded out during Thomas's flute solo. The Moody Blues 1994 compilation album, Time Traveller, marked the first time the orchestral link was included on a compilation. Its release on 1998's Anthology also included the first-portion orchestral finale.

In concert, "Tuesday Afternoon" is usually ended with a short reprise of the opening acoustic guitar riff after the flute solo, although when the Moody Blues perform backed by a live orchestra, the original orchestral link ends the song.

== Part two ==
The second half of the album version is a track entitled "(Evening) Time to Get Away", which is uncredited on the original album. Composed by John Lodge, the song hinges on the end of a work day and returning home.

== Use in advertising ==
- In 2009, "Tuesday Afternoon" was included in a commercial for Visa's Check Card. The commercial depicted a man taking his daughter to an aquarium on a Tuesday afternoon, and is narrated by actor Morgan Freeman.

== Personnel ==
- Justin Hayward: lead vocal, acoustic guitar
- John Lodge: backing vocal, bass guitar
- Mike Pinder: mellotron, piano
- Ray Thomas: flute
- Graeme Edge: drums, percussion
- Peter Knight and the London Festival Orchestra: orchestral arrangements

== Chart history ==
Chart (1968)	Peak position
Canada (RPM) Top Singles	12
U.S. Billboard Hot 100	24

== Cover versions ==
- New-age piano player David Lanz recorded an instrumental version of "Tuesday Afternoon" for his album Songs from an English Garden.
- Jazz singer Bobbi Wilsyn performs "Tuesday Afternoon" on her album It's About Time.
- Northern Soul band The Senate covered "Tuesday Afternoon" on their L.P. Piper Club Dance
- Progrock singer/keyboardist Neal Morse covered "Tuesday Afternoon" on his album Cover To Cover
- Dutch 1960s–1970s band Etcetera Music Band covered "Tuesday Afternoon" and released it as a digital single in 2010.
- The Doughboys (NJ garage rockers) covered "Tuesday Afternoon" on their 2010 album Act Your Rage; their version was chosen to be "Coolest Song In The World" on Little Steven's Underground Garage show on Sirius/XM Satellite Radio.
- Turkish rock singer Erkin Koray covered this song with Turkish lyrics "Yine Yalnızım" in 1969.
