= Have You Heard (The Moody Blues song) =

Song by The Moody Blues

from the album On the Threshold of a Dream
- Released: 25 April 1969
- Recorded: 18 January 1969
- Genre: Progressive rock
- Length: 1:28 (Part 1); 2:27 (Part 2)
- Label: Deram
- Songwriter(s): Mike Pinder
- Producer(s): Tony Clarke

"Have You Heard" is a 1969 song by the progressive rock band the Moody Blues. Written by the band's keyboardist Mike Pinder, "Have You Heard" is actually a two-part song, and both parts were recorded and released in 1969 on the Moody Blues Album On the Threshold of a Dream.

Ronnie Aldrich did an instrumental cover of the song in his album The Way We Were (1974).

This song was used at the beginning and end of the winter finale episode, "Self Control" of Agents of S.H.I.E.L.D. on 21 February 2017.

== Personnel ==
=== Have You Heard ===
- Mike Pinder – Mellotron, cello, vocals
- Justin Hayward – acoustic guitar
- John Lodge – bass guitar
- Graeme Edge – drums, EMS VCS 3
- Ray Thomas – flute

=== The Voyage ===
- Mike Pinder – Mellotron, Hammond organ, cello, piano
- Ray Thomas – oboe, flute
- Graeme Edge – percussion
