= Days of Future Passed =

1967 studio album by The Moody Blues

Studio album by the Moody Blues
- Released: 17 November 1967
- Recorded: 9 May – 3 November 1967
- Studios: Decca, London
- Genres: Progressive rock; art rock; psychedelic rock; baroque pop; symphonic rock
- Length: 41:34
- Label: Deram
- Producers: Tony Clarke; Michael Dacre-Barclay

The Moody Blues chronology
The Magnificent Moodies (1965)	Days of Future Passed (1967)	In Search of the Lost Chord (1968)

Singles from Days of Future Passed
- 1. "Nights in White Satin" Released: 3 November 1967; 2. "Tuesday Afternoon" Released: 19 July 1968

Days of Future Passed is the second studio album by English progressive rock band the Moody Blues, released on 17 November 1967, by Deram Records. It has been cited by the Rock and Roll Hall of Fame and others as one of the earliest albums of the progressive rock genre and one of rock music's first concept albums.

The album represents a significant creative turning point for the band. The album is their first with guitarist and singer Justin Hayward, who replaced Denny Laine, and bassist John Lodge, who replaced Clint Warwick. The album is also their first to feature longtime producer and collaborator Tony Clarke and the first to feature keyboardist Mike Pinder on Mellotron. These changes, combined with a shift away from R&B covers toward original compositions and a thematic concept, helped define the band's sound for the next several albums and earned the group new critical and commercial success. The album was recorded to showcase the stereo recording techniques of Decca Records' new imprint, Deram. The label had requested the group record covers of pop and classical music along with an orchestra. Instead, the album features original compositions expressing the day in a life of an everyday person, interspersed with orchestral interludes arranged and conducted by Peter Knight and performed by the London Festival Orchestra.

The album was a moderate success upon release, but steady FM radio airplay and the success of hit single "Nights in White Satin", led the album to become a top ten US hit by 1972. It has since been listed among the most important albums of 1967 by Rolling Stone.

== Background ==
The Moody Blues had started out as a rhythm and blues band, and had achieved commercial success in late 1964/early 1965 with the UK No.1 and US Top 10 single "Go Now". However, by late 1966, they had run into financial difficulties and personnel changes; as such, the band decided to change their creative course. Guitarist/singer Denny Laine and bassist Clint Warwick left the group to pursue other interests, allowing John Lodge, former bandmate and friend of Ray Thomas, to join the group on bass. The band would find guitarist and singer Justin Hayward through Eric Burdon of the Animals who had put out an advert for a new bandmember and passed on the responses he had rejected. The addition of Lodge and Hayward brought two additional songwriters into the group, allowing the band to pursue a new creative direction, which included writing about what they knew, rather than about American themes when they had not yet visited America. After a complaint about the poor quality of their R&B covers, the band focused on their own material

One element of the group's new musical direction was the use of the Mellotron. The Mellotron is a keyboard instrument where each key plays a tape loop of a recording of another instrument, chorus, or orchestra. Developed by the West Midlands company Streetly Electronics in the early 1960s, the instrument served as a precursor to sampling keyboards and synthesizers. Mike Pinder, a previous employee of Streetly, used his connections to purchase one of the instruments for the group at a reduced price. An October 1967 Sunday Mirror article gives the price of the band's Mellotron at £1,300, which was paid for by an air conditioning business millionaire, Derek McCormick. Though the instrument could prove fickle in concert, Pinder's experience allowed him to overcome any challenges. He converted the rhythm keyboard into a copy of the 12 second tape loop solo keyboard, so he could continue playing the second keyboard while the tape loop on the first reset. The instrument's ability to reproduce orchestral string sounds in the studio and in concert paired well with Ray Thomas' flute, which he had recently adopted in place of harmonica. Edge reflects on three distinct developments that drove the band's change in sound and creative development: "I think it was three different forces coming together. One was Tony Clarke, the producer. The other was the Mellotron, which Mike Pinder was playing. And the other was Justin Hayward joining the band, because he didn't come the rock 'n' roll route, he came the English folk route. So his feel for chord structure was just that little bit different."

== Writing ==
In October 1966, the group relocated to Mouscron, Belgium to write new material and embark on a Belgian tour. Their shows typically consisted of two sets, the first consisting of rhythm and blues covers including "Go Now" and the second consisting of newly written original songs. Lodge says, "We loved playing together. It was really good. It was exciting when it was our own songs, we weren't playing a song someone had written for us. So every part of every song we'd invented ourselves. We wanted to play each part exactly right and new and like no one else had ever played that particular part to a song before. That was exciting about Days of Future Passed, creating something that no one else ever created before. That gave a great feeling." Lodge continues, "We went to a little village in Mouscron to start writing our own songs and we wrote a lot of songs before Days of Future Passed. But Days of Future Passed dictated its own album, really. When we knew what we wanted to do with Days of Future Passed, we dedicated the songwriting to exactly that album. And everything we did before was just left alone.

Graeme Edge remembers, "We designed a stage show which was going to be '24 hours': daylight 12 and night 12, and we had "Tuesday Afternoon" and "Nights" and I think "Peak Hour" all written for that." Lodge continues, "Ultimately, it was agreed that the record would be a concept album tracking a day in the life of Everyman, with original songs relating to different parts of the day performed in chronological order, introduced and interspersed with orchestral music. Considering that all five members of the group wrote material for the album prior to the concept being established, it's remarkable how seamless the execution of it was." Pinder explains the desire for a cohesive theme, "I had always wanted to create something that was conceptual. I loved the works of Mantovani. I wanted to have our albums on people's shelves...albums that people would want to collect, and play in their entirety."

Keyboardist Mike Pinder wrote "Dawn Is a Feeling" and Hayward wrote "Nights in White Satin", which served as early bookends for the concept. Hayward explains, "Nights In White Satin" had been recorded quite a long time before it was for Days of Future Passed. "Nights In White Satin" and "Dawn Is A Feeling" were the two key songs that gave us the idea of the story of a day in the life of one guy, and that's what our stage show was about before Days of Future Passed was mentioned or thought about. So we had those two times of the day and the idea, then it was just a question of grubbing different times of the day to write about; it was quite frivolous, really ... nothing really too serious. I just put my hand up for the afternoon. So I ended up with "Tuesday Afternoon", and Ray Thomas wrote "Twilight Time".

Mike Pinder's "Dawn is a Feeling" opens the concept with a sense of optimism. Its lyrics acknowledge the spirit of the ongoing Summer of Love and embrace the feeling that society was approaching a new sense of enlightenment, a new spirituality. Lodge remembers the song as a step in a new direction for the group, and for Pinder's songwriting: "I would think it was like an awakening for him as well. He wanted to be a creative writer. Mike wrote fabulous songs. There's something special about the morning. And I think that was the dawning of the Moody Blues, really."

The whimsical "Another Morning" was written by flautist Ray Thomas. Lodge remembers, "He sang me the song. Ray plays flute and harmonica. He doesn't play any chordal instruments. And so I remember him singing the song to me. And I remember getting the guitar out and playing it with him in the house. Ray has got this wonderful smiley attitude to life. It's a childlike look on life, which is really nice."

Bassist John Lodge remembers the inspiration for "Peak Hour": "I wrote "Peak Hour" in the back of a truck. We were coming back from a gig and the rhythm of the wheels on the tarmac were giving a very strong rhythm. I was pounding my foot on the floor and I said to Graeme, 'Could you keep this tempo up for about three minutes? I think I've written a song.'" He continues, "That's where I basically wrote it. I got the main part, the rock and roll part of it, from there. And worked out the bass part. But I really wanted to do something different in the song. That's why I broke it into a cathedral choir-type part in the middle. So it could build back up into a rock and roll song. One part of it would go up-tempo and then it stops and becomes really really quiet with the organ sounds and then it starts again rock and roll."

Hayward recalls writing "Tuesday Afternoon": "I was a little hung up with doing tempo changes in the middle of songs. If I got bored, in order to open up another door within the song, I wanted to just go to a different type of mood. In fact, "Tuesday Afternoon" was the first time we did that. I knew by then, by the time I had written "Tuesday Afternoon", that we were going to do this stage show that was based on a day in the life of one guy, even before we recorded the album. I already had "Nights in White Satin", and we were already starting to learn that and play it. But there was a gap in this story of the day, so I went down to my parents' house in the west country, and I had a dog called Tuesday at the time. Not that the dog is in the song, in any way. I smoked a little joint on the side of a field with a guitar, and that song just came out." He continues, "It was just about searching for some kind of enlightenment or some kind of religious or psychedelic experience in life. I didn't really mean it to be taken too seriously, but six months later, there it was: Our first single in America."

Lodge explains the theme of "(Evening) Time to Get Away": "It's really about, if you can achieve something every day, it doesn't matter how small it is, it just gives you that energy to carry on and have an enjoyable life. Concerning "The Sun Set" and "Twilight Time", Lodge remembers, "We were trying to make sure that every song on the album had a different aspect. That was the most important thing. That every song on the album, no one could say, 'Oh, that sounds like that.'"

Hayward wrote "Nights in White Satin" about the changes between one relationship and another, using bedsheets as a metaphor. He remembers the inspiration: "I was the end of one big love affair and at the beginning of another. When you're just 20, as I was, that's quite important in your life. A girlfriend had given me white satin sheets... It was a lovely romantic gesture, and that's what I thought of it. I came home one night after a gig, and sat on the side of the bed, and a lot of these thoughts came out. I do write letters never meaning to send. I find it a cathartic thing. If I have an issue with somebody or about something, I find it easier to write it down and get it out rather than turning it over in my mind. It's a series of random thoughts and ideas from a very stoned 20-year-old young man who was desperately sad for himself over one love affair, and desperately excited by the next." Hayward continues, "I came back from a gig one night and sat on the side of my bed. I was sharing a flat with Graeme at the time. It was very early, it was almost light. The verses of the songs just came out. I took it into the rehearsal room the next day and I played it to the rest of the group. I got to the end of it and everybody was like, 'Well, it's alright.' Mike Pinder said, 'Play it again.' I played it again and he played the Mellotron line and suddenly everybody was interested. He put that sort of orchestration to it and suddenly it worked."

The album opens with the Graeme Edge poem "Morning Glory" and concludes with his "Late Lament". Edge remembers, "I'd written both those pieces of verse because the 'Morning' section appeared rather empty when we first heard it. The latter part of the poem seemed a perfect end to the record. I'd originally written the words as lyrics for someone else to put some music to, but poetry has a rhythmic structure that makes it difficult to turn into a song, so Tony Clarke suggested recording it as a spoken word piece." In another interview, he elaborates further, "As musicians, we knew a lot about life after mid-day. But we hadn't seen that many mornings over the years (laughs). So we were a bit blank. And I set out to write a song that covered the mornings, "Morning Glory", and as it progressed, I also did an evening part of it, which became "Late Lament", but I was intending to write the lyrics to a song. I took it in and presented to the boys and said, 'Can anybody put any music to this?' They all read it and said, 'This is fantastic but there's way too many words, you just can't sing that. You have to have spaces where they can hold a vowel and sing instead of just talk.' I went 'Oh yeah, let's see, I can cut it down.' And Tony Clarke said 'No, no, no, that is fantastic. You read it and we'll put music behind it, some strings—make it into something,' which they did. And then they sort of sidled up to me and said, 'You know, it's great, but it's a bit better with Mike's voice.' Like I was going to get upset! I was absolutely thrilled to have something on the album."

== Recording ==
In the summer of 1967, the group made several BBC appearances, debuting "Nights in White Satin" and "Peak Hour". Hearing the final BBC mix of "Nights in White Satin" heightened the band's excitement for the song and their new material. Hayward remembers, "A long time before we recorded it for Decca, we recorded it for the BBC. We recorded it and weren't invited into the control room to listen to it back. And then in our van on the way to a gig we listened to it, because it was on a program called Saturday Club — on a Saturday, of course — and we were going up the motorway and we heard it on the radio. And we pulled the car over, or the van, over to the side of the road, and we said, 'Hey, maybe there's something in that song,' because there was something about it, it sounded really good. We hadn't realised until we'd heard it back ourselves."

In October, the group were granted studio time to record a demonstration disc for Decca's newly formed Deram Records division. The company was eager to demonstrate their latest recording techniques, which were named "Deramic Sound". Decca had experimented with stereophonic sound for classical recordings, and hoped to capture the pop market in the same way, by interweaving classical recordings with the group's interpretation of the same music. Hayward remembers, "They were launching a label called the Deramic Sound System later to become Deram and every recording was in stereo—not just remastered later in stereo, like the Beatles—but actually recorded with a wide stereo sound, everything in its proper stereo place. Stereo then was confined to classical music and they wanted to demonstrate stereo could be as interesting for rock and roll as it was with classical."

For the demonstration record, Knight and the group were asked to record unoriginal material to demonstrate the new stereo technology, incorporating both orchestral and popular music. Band members remember being asked by the label to record an album incorporating elements of Antonín Dvořák's Symphony No. 9. Thomas explains, "They wanted a demonstration disc made for all the salesmen to try and sell Deramic Sound and we could never get any studio time. We were developing Days of Future Passed as a stage show. They wanted us to play tunes like "Blue Suede Shoes", "Rock Around the Clock" and stuff like that, and wanted Peter Knight and the London Festival Orchestra to play Dvorák's New World Symphony. We said that's going to sound bloody awful. One minute they're listening to "Blue Suede Shoes" and then the next minute to the symphony and us playing someone else."

Eager to capitalize on the opportunity for studio time, and confident in the quality of their newly written material, the band agreed to the label's plan and then quietly decided to record their live set of original songs instead. John Lodge remembers, "The Decca Record company approached us and said they wanted to make what they called a sampler album for their new four-frequency range sound system in stereo, and they wanted to incorporate what they called a 'pop' band. They wanted us to record Dvorak's 'New World Symphony' and we said, 'Yeah, fantastic!' But we didn't tell them we were going into the studio with the conductor, Peter Knight, and record basically our stage show. That's what we did." Hayward remembers, "We said, yeah, sure we'd do it, and then, after we said yes, we went down to the pub and decided to do our own songs instead. It was a conspiracy among all us musicians who were present, and we just went into the studio and recorded our own stage show." Session engineer and longtime studio collaborator Derek Varnals confirms that neither the band nor Knight and the orchestra made any effort to record unoriginal material during the sessions.

Recording sessions for the album took place at Decca Studios in West Hampstead, London beginning with "Dawn Is a Feeling" on 18 October and concluding on the 27th, with mixing complete by 3 November. "Nights in White Satin" was recorded prior to the rest of the album, on 8 October. Lodge recalls, "It took all of seven days. So, it took one whole week to record Days of Future Passed." Thomas remembers, "We were recording one and two songs a day, which we were used to doing. Because you got no time at all in the studio in those days."

The band worked with record producer Tony Clarke, engineer Derek Varnals, and conductor Peter Knight. Hayward remembers, "We got lucky. We had Decca, who had classically trained engineers, and our stuff was recorded beautifully. The engineer, Derek Varnals, and Tony Clarke had an influence on the way that our songs were presented. If you look at other things we did at the time that weren't in the Decca studios, they're much more rock 'n' roll and piano based and trying to be a little more up-front and thinking of singles. But all of the stuff that we did in Decca had a particular sound and a particular quality to it that did have that orchestral thing. They knew how to put that together. Decca was a company that was really committed to selling albums, not singles. They had a whole consumer division for stereo systems that they were trying to push. That was a big help to us in the early days because they wanted us to make beautiful stereo records that could demonstrate that stereo could be interesting for rock 'n' roll. It just happened to coincide with us going to America and the birth of FM radio. A lot of things came together.

In a departure from usual practice, the band was able to book the studio during the sessions for entire days at a time, instead of intermittent sessions. The extended sessions facilitated their work, allowing the group to record late into the night. Lodge explains: "At the time, studios [followed a format] of three recording sessions a day. Like 10:00 to 1:00, 2:00 to 5:00 and 6:00 til 10:00. You used to book your sessions, and when they were over you had to leave the studio or wait for the engineers to come back. We knew that if we wanted to make something different, we wanted 24-hour "lockout". We went to the chairman of the company and said we'd like a "lockout". And I don't think they had ever had a request for that before, but, fortunately, they agreed. And it was wonderful, because we were recording a tune a day, and as the evening came we'd relax for a while. Midnight would come and then we'd start again. As the early hours came – 2:00, 3:00, 4:00 in the morning, we realized that was a great time to be constructive and creative. It was great to be able to do that."

The group recorded and mixed their sessions first, then passed the finished tapes over to Knight for arranging and recording the orchestral interludes. Hayward explains, "It took us five days to finish, and, after each day we'd send them down to the orchestra's conductor, Peter Knight, and he'd write these orchestral arrangements. We'd edited all the tapes to be the right length, and they just played live in the gaps." Pinder recalls, "We were not there when the orchestra parts were done. But we had a wonderful group listening session after they added their contributions. We loved what they had done."

The orchestral interludes were recorded during a single session on 3 November, and were performed by the London Festival Orchestra conducted by Peter Knight. The orchestra was an ad hoc grouping of professional musicians who served as the house orchestra for Decca Records. Hayward explains, "They were just a bunch of gypsies, what they called string players in London at the time. They were made up from a few different orchestras; they were great players. But the most important thing about that was Peter Knight who orchestrated and arranged the classical parts of the record was in my opinion the greatest romantic string arranger of the era. He was an inspiration to us. His work on the album will stand forever." The orchestral parts were recorded in a single session. Hayward remembers, "The orchestra was recorded in one three-hour session — a run through and then one take. I was in the studio. I wasn't invited in to the control room. Those were the days when the artist was certainly not invited into the control room for an opinion. But I was there at the Peter Knight session, and it was quite wonderful."

One memorable moment was the recording of the background vocals on "Nights in White Satin". Thomas remembers, "When we did "Nights in White Satin", the four of us got 'round a mic and sang in harmony. And then Tony said, 'Let's do another take.' He was doubling it up! When I heard the playback, it was like a mini choir. There were a few tears shed." Lodge remembers recording the song so that each element, each instrument had its own space: "We said we've got to make it where in parts of the song, except for Justin's vocal, you can hear a pin drop. It was really important so that the bass had its own space and the acoustic guitar had its own space in the verses, nothing else was playing. So that when the Mellotron came in, you heard the dimension." The band were pleased with the results. Drummer Edge remembers, "When we recorded the song for Decca we all felt we had created something marvelous. It was quite an emotional experience to hear the finished mix of the song for the first time." He continues and compares the moment to "Fairy dust. The invisible, unknowable thing. It's just one of those songs where everything came together correctly."

The group held a playback session attended by the group, Decca executives and various associates in a dimly lit recording studio. Lodge remembers the moment: "After the playback session finished and the studio lights came on once more the smiles on our faces said it all. We knew we had been right to stick to our principles and record our own music." The Moody Blues did not play any of the music to Decca executives until it was complete. Upon the first play, they were disappointed with the result as it was not the Dvorak arrangements they expected. Walt Maguire, representative for London Records (Decca's North American arm), however, thought it would be a strong seller in the US, so it was agreed to release the album as recorded. Hayward remembers, "When we played the finished product to all these old directors at Decca, which is a fine, upstanding old English music firm, they said, 'This isn't Dvorak,' and we said, 'No, but this is what it is.' We had one ally there, and he really stood up for us; he said, 'I think it could be quite interesting,' and besides, we had made a stereo demonstration record--it just wasn't Dvorak. So eventually we got enough of them to believe in it to put it out, and it was an instant hit."

== Album cover ==
The album cover was designed by David Anstey and was commissioned for the album. Hayward remembers, "He was just thrown this idea, and we met him in a pub and told him about our songs, and he knocked that out, and they used it. It was reduced in scale from David Anstey's original picture." The cover features a painted collage of various time-related images inspired by the album's songs, including an hourglass, a sunset, moon phases and mounted knights.

== Release ==
Days of Future Passed was released on 17 November 1967 in the UK (delayed from a 3 November 1967 announcement), and arrived in the US in March 1968. It reached number 27 in the UK Albums Chart on February 13, 1968. In the US, it was a steady seller in the late 1960s, helped by FM radio play of "Nights in White Satin", also reaching a peak of number 27 by October 12, 1968. When a 1972 reissue of "Nights In White Satin" climbed to number 2, the album re-entered the US Billboard chart and eventually peaked at number 3.

The U.S. mono version (Deram DE-16012) was pressed in a limited quantity as it was released during the "phase-out" of mono LP releases by the major record companies, thus it is an often-sought item amongst record collectors.

Days of Future Passed was issued as a discrete Quadraphonic open-reel tape in 1977. This master was also used for a 2001 dts 5.1 channel audio CD release and again for a two-disc Deluxe Edition SACD release in 2006.

In July 1978, it was discovered that the UK master tapes for Days of Future Passed had deteriorated. As a result of this, the album was remixed in its entirety in August 1978, which was used for reissues between 1978 and 2017. Some compilations, however, continued to use the original 1967 stereo mix for certain songs. The album's original mix was released in its entirety on compact disc in November 2017 as Days of Future Passed 50th Anniversary Deluxe Edition. Then in March 2018, the Moody Blues released Days of Future Passed Live that was recorded live in Toronto on 13 July 2017 with a full backup provided by the Toronto World Festival Orchestra.

== Reception ==
Professional ratings
Review scores
Source	Rating
AllMusic	4.5/5 stars
The Music Box	5/5 stars
PopMatters	9/10
Rolling Stone (1968)	(mixed)
Rolling Stone (2007)	(favourable)
Spin	(favourable)
Sputnikmusic	5/5
Uncut	4/5 stars
Yahoo! Music	(favourable)

Upon its release, Rolling Stone gave the album an unenthusiastic review, writing "The Moody Blues [...] have matured considerably since 'Go Now', but their music is constantly marred by one of the most startlingly saccharine conceptions of 'beauty' and 'mysticism' that any rock group has ever affected." New York magazine dismissed it as "a ponderous mound of thought-jello." However, the album has since received acclaim; for example, Spin cited it as a classic of progressive rock. By 2007, Rolling Stone — which had originally described Days of Future Passed as "an English rock group strangling itself in conceptual goo" — included it in its list of the essential albums of 1967.

Music writers cite the album as an early example of progressive rock music. Bill Holdship of Yahoo! Music remarks that the band "created an entire genre here." David Fricke cites it as one of the essential albums of 1967 and finds it "closer to high-art pomp than psychedelia. But there is a sharp pop discretion to the writing and a trippy romanticism in the mirroring effect of the strings and Mike Pinder's Mellotron." Will Hermes cites the album as an essential progressive rock record and opines that its use of the Mellotron, a tape replay keyboard, made it a "signature" element of the genre. An influential work of the counterculture period, AllMusic editor Bruce Eder calls the album "one of the defining documents of the blossoming psychedelic era, and one of the most enduringly popular albums of its era".

== Track listing ==
All compositions originally credited to "Redwave-Knight". ('Redwave' is a collective alias for the band members.)

Side one
No.	Title	Writer(s)	Lead singer	Length
1.	"The Day Begins": "The Day Begins"; "Morning Glory" (unlisted)	Peter Knight and Graeme Edge: Knight; Edge and Knight	Mike Pinder: Instrumental; Pinder (recitation)	5:50 4:08 1:42
2.	"Dawn: Dawn Is a Feeling"	Pinder	Justin Hayward and Pinder	3:48
3.	"The Morning: Another Morning"	Ray Thomas	Thomas	3:55
4.	"Lunch Break: Peak Hour"	John Lodge	Lodge	5:33
Total length:				19:08

Side two
No.	Title	Writer(s)	Lead singer	Length
1.	"The Afternoon": "Forever Afternoon (Tuesday?)"; "(Evening) Time to Get Away"	Hayward and Lodge: Hayward; Lodge	Hayward and Lodge: Hayward; Lodge	8:23 5:06 3:17
2.	"Evening": "The Sunset"; "Twilight Time"	Pinder and Thomas: Pinder; Thomas	Pinder and Thomas: Pinder; Thomas	6:40 3:17 3:23
3.	"The Night": "Nights in White Satin"; "Late Lament / Resolvement" (unlisted)	Hayward, Edge and Knight: Hayward; Edge and Knight	Hayward and Pinder: Hayward; Pinder (recitation)	7:24 5:38 1:46
Total length:				22:27 41:34

Note: "(Evening) Time to Get Away" is unlisted on original pressings, but has since been added to all subsequent track listings.

== Personnel ==
The Moody Blues

- Justin Hayward – vocals, guitar
- John Lodge – bass, vocals
- Mike Pinder – Mellotron, vocals
- Ray Thomas – flute, vocals
- Graeme Edge – drums

with:

- The London Festival Orchestra
- Peter Knight – conducting, arrangements

=== Production ===
- Tony Clarke – producer
- Michael Dacre-Barclay – producer
- Derek Varnals – engineer
- Hugh Mendl – executive production, liner notes
- David Anstey – cover design, cover painting
- Steven Fallone – digital remastering

== Charts ==
Chart (1967–1972)	Peak position
Australian Albums (Kent Music Report)	10
Canadian Albums (RPM)	3
UK Albums (Official Charts)	27
US Billboard 200	3

== Certifications ==
Region	Certification	Certified units/sales
Canada (Music Canada)	Platinum	100,000^{^}
United Kingdom (BPI) release of 1993	Silver	60,000^{‡}
United States (RIAA)	Platinum	1,000,000^{^}
^{^} Shipments figures based on certification alone.^{‡} Sales+streaming figures based on certification alone.
