= London Festival Orchestra =

British orchestra

The London Festival Orchestra (LFO) was an orchestra established in the 1950s. Originally it was the 'house orchestra' for Decca Records, initially directed by Peter Knight, but in 1980 it was incorporated as an independent orchestra, directed by Ross Pople.

With the staging of the orchestra's summer festival of music in cathedrals, under the title Cathedral Classics, sponsored by American Express and British Gas, London Festival Orchestra quickly became a household name in the UK and abroad. In 1994 Pople's vision of artistic independence inspired the creation of The Warehouse; making LFO the first British orchestra to own a permanent, independent home. The Warehouse, situated in the heart of the South Bank, is a rehearsal, recording and concert venue. This is also where the LFO musicians are showcased in various collaborations as The Warehouse Ensemble with in-house performances.

BMG's new classical music label Arte Nova contracted LFO to record the bulk of its new classical music label in the late 90s. The LFO's discography also includes recordings for Deutsche Grammophon, Hyperion and ASV.

Additional to the LFO's London concert seasons at the Southbank Centre and the Barbican Centre, and more recently the Cadogan Hall, the Orchestra has a long history of touring in the Far East, the Middle East and the Americas; at the Seoul Olympics; as cultural ambassadors to Argentina at the resolution of the Falkland Conflict; with annual tours to Germany, France and the Netherlands.

The LFO was also featured in a 2004 episode of architectural show Grand Designs due to its objections to the colour of the brick in a neighbouring building.
