= Never Comes the Day =

Single by The Moody Blues

from the album On the Threshold of a Dream
- B-side: "So Deep Within You"
- Released: 2 April 1969
- Recorded: 22 January 1969
- Genre: Folk rock
- Length: 4:43
- Label: Deram
- Songwriter: Justin Hayward
- Producer: Tony Clarke

The Moody Blues singles chronology
"Ride My See-Saw" (1968)	"Never Comes the Day" (1969)	"Watching and Waiting" (1969)

"Never Comes the Day" is a 1969 single by the progressive rock band the Moody Blues. It was written by band member Justin Hayward, and was the only single released from their 1969 album On the Threshold of a Dream.

== Background ==
The song was edited from the album version of 4:43 down to 2:42. The single edit omits the second verse and simply goes into the longer chorus after the first verse. A similar edit was done on the Justin Hayward/John Lodge (Blue Jays) song "I Dreamed Last Night", but that version ends cold. Despite the fact that the album was a number-one hit in the UK, "Never Comes the Day" was a commercial flop as a single, and did not chart in the UK. The single also included Mike Pinder's "So Deep Within You," another track from the same album, on the B-side.

== Reception ==
Cash Box described it as "starting in a gentle folk vein" with less impact than expected, but then grows to become a "hypnotic outing." Record World said that "This soft and sweet art -rock picks up halfway through and could be the biggest yet for the group." In Canada, the song peaked at #74 in May and was then off the charts through June, but came back to rank #85 in July.

== Personnel ==
- Justin Hayward – acoustic & electric guitars, lead vocals, Mellotron, handclapping
- John Lodge – bass guitar, backing vocals, handclapping
- Mike Pinder – Mellotron, backing vocals, handclapping
- Ray Thomas – harmonica, backing vocals, handclapping
- Graeme Edge – drums, percussion, backing vocals, handclapping

== Chart positions ==
Chart (1969)	Peak position
Belgium (Ultratop 50 Wallonia)	48
Canada RPM	74
Billboard Hot 100	91
