= Ride My See-Saw =

Single by The Moody Blues

from the album In Search of the Lost Chord
- B-side: "A Simple Game" (UK); "Voices in the Sky" (US)
- Released: September 1968 (US); October 1968 (UK)
- Recorded: January–June 1968
- Genre: Progressive rock
- Length: 3:39
- Label: Deram
- Songwriter: John Lodge
- Producer: Tony Clarke

The Moody Blues singles chronology
"Voices in the Sky" (1968)	"Ride My See-Saw" (1968)	"Never Comes the Day" (1969)

Official audio
- "Ride My See-Saw" on YouTube

Audio sample
- "Ride My See-Saw": file; help

"Ride My See-Saw" is a 1968 single by the English progressive rock band the Moody Blues. Written by the band's bassist John Lodge, it was first released on the Moody Blues' 1968 album In Search of the Lost Chord. It was the second of two singles from that album, the other being "Voices in the Sky".

On the album, the song is preceded by a spoken word introduction called "Departure" that was written by Graeme Edge.

Billboard described the single as a "blockbuster rocker" that "comes on strong with all the ingredients to spiral [the Moody Blues] to the top in short order" and a "mover from start to finish." Cash Box called it a "dance track with powerful teen attraction" and "polished vocals."

Classic Rock History critic Brian Kachejian rated it as the Moody Blues' 6th greatest song, adding that it "combined heavy and mystic rhythms with the great signature Moody Blues spoken introduction." Ultimate Classic Rock critic Nick DeRiso rated it as the Moody Blues' 7th greatest song, saying it provides evidence that the Moody Blues could rock. Classic Rock critic Malcolm Dome rated it as the Moody Blues' 8th greatest song, describing it as "an uptempo, vibrant rock’n’roll song" that "delivers a scathing attack on people’s desperation to be part of the rat race."

== Personnel ==
- John Lodge ― bass guitar, cello, vocals
- Justin Hayward ― electric guitar, acoustic guitar, vocals
- Mike Pinder ― Mellotron, vocals
- Ray Thomas ― tambourine, vocals
- Graeme Edge ― drums, maracas

== Chart positions ==
Chart (1968)	Peak position
UK Singles Chart	42
Canada RPM	33
Billboard Hot 100	61

== Use in popular media ==
- An instrumental version of "Ride My See-Saw" recorded by Ronnie Aldrich and the London Festival Orchestra was used as the theme music for the Canadian morning programme Canada AM on CTV during the 1970s.
- This song was used as bumper music for Art Bell's radio program Coast to Coast AM, and as the intro song to his short-lived Art Bell's Dark Matter.
