= To Our Children's Children's Children =

Studio album by the Moody Blues
- Released: 21 November 1969
- Recorded: May–September 1969
- Studios: Decca, London
- Genre: Progressive rock
- Length: 40:15
- Label: Threshold
- Producer: Tony Clarke

The Moody Blues chronology
On the Threshold of a Dream (1969)	To Our Children's Children's Children (1969)	A Question of Balance (1970)

Singles from To Our Children's Children's Children
- 1. "Watching and Waiting" Released: 31 October 1969

Professional ratings
Review scores
Source	Rating
AllMusic	3/5 stars

To Our Children's Children's Children is the fifth album by the Moody Blues, released in November 1969.

== Background ==
The album was the first released on the group's newly formed Threshold record label, which was named after the band's previous album from the same year, On the Threshold of a Dream. It was inspired by the 1969 Moon landing. Drummer Graeme Edge remembers, "It was a very exciting time. Man had just gone to the moon and we thought of the album as a sort of time capsule - all our thoughts and feelings about living in such an epoch-making era." Keyboardist Mike Pinder adds, "To me, we were creating a rocket for every person who wants to go to the moon but couldn't, and would get to do so with the earphones on or the stereo turned up, lying on their backs on the carpet."

== Writing ==
Like the group's three previous albums, To Our Children's Children's Children is a concept album, one with a common theme that ties the songs together. For Children, the band was inspired by the space race and the July 1969 Apollo 11 moon landing, which occurred during the album's sessions. Keyboardist Mike Pinder remembers, "We were watching man going to the moon. In the studio, we were watching it. I remember Neil Armstrong setting down. We weren't in the studio that night but I remember it was like 4 A.M. in the morning and I was in my apartment in London. I remember that part of it. But the album was all around the moon mission and man's venturing into space. This was the beginning of maybe discovering man's true legacy." Hayward remembers producer Tony Clarke being a driving force behind the concept: "To Our Children's Children's Children...was really driven by Tony Clarke, our producer. It was something that he really wanted to do, and I'm glad that we were able to share that with him." He elaborates, "He had a bee in his bonnet about doing an album about space; he was an astronomer and followed the stars. He built this dome on the top of his house with big telescopes, and really used to get quite boring about it! But it was a baby of his, and his idea was really to try and coincide releasing an album - in our usual kind of pretentious way - with man landing on the moon. I'd already written a song called 'Watching and Waiting,' which was done on this old pipe organ, and then, to balance that, I had the idea for 'Gypsy.' Clarke confirms, "I very much wanted us to make a space album, and at the time I was very immersed in that sort of thing. Now that was my frame of mind, and I rather pushed it in that direction, so everybody capitulated."

Bassist John Lodge remembers fleshing out the album by asking "What would it be like if we were the people on the rocket ship going out into space...going to the moon, going to Mars. What would we think? What would be our thoughts? And that was what the album was about." The album has the additional theme of the passage of time. Drummer Graeme Edge explains, "To Our Children's Children was kind of buried under stone to be dug up in 200 years with a time capsule kind of feeling." He continues, "The idea behind the album was to imagine that the record had been placed under a foundation stone and wouldn't be removed for a couple of hundred years."

The album, like its predecessors, begins with a Graeme Edge poem "Higher and Higher", recited by Mike Pinder. The spoken word introduction is set to a musical simulation of the sound of the Saturn V rocket blasting off. The band had intended to begin the album with the actual recorded sound of the moon mission rocket launching, and contacted NASA who provided the group with tapes. The sound proved unsatisfactory, inspiring the group to record their own interpretation on Mellotron and rock instruments. Lodge remembers, "We actually got NASA to send over a recording of real rocket taking off, but when we listened to the tape it sounded like a damp squib! We had to set about creating our own rocket sound which ended up sounding more authentic." Pinder varies the pitch of his vocal delivery on the track, with his voice becoming clearer and louder as the song progresses. To help achieve this, he holds his nose and then releases while delivering the lines of the poem. He remembers, "I was holding my nose until that one moment, and then when 'butterfly sneezes', that's when I opened up."

The recording of "Higher and Higher" represented a creative highlight of the album's production. Engineer Derek Varnals remembers how the band recreated the effect using only musical instruments on the track: "The rumbling sound of a rocket blasting off was several layers of instruments. We had guitar amplifiers turned up really loud with no instrument playing. You can get the sound of a general white noise roaring away on an amp. We had a Hammond organ and Mellotron motors going with microphones right by the motors. We had muffled drums being rolled and maybe a couple of electronic things in there. I think we had the Hammond and Mellotron gradually working their way up [the scale] to give you the idea of a crescendo. The idea is to give you the impression that you are going up into orbit, leaving the [booster] behind, as we've all seen film of the third stage separating and falling back to earth." Pinder adds, "It was armfuls of keyboards being played. It was crossed arms on the keys, starting at one end and working up to the other. We were all doing this sort of thing. It was five guys at their instruments, letting loose. I liked what we did, sound-wise: the fact that we actually conjured up the sound of a rocket taking off with nothing more than musical instruments. I definitely felt a sense of achievement with that."

Lodge's "Eyes of a Child" transitions the mood and opens with the more relaxed sounds of Pinder playing a 7 foot golden harp and Ray Thomas playing a bass flute. The song considers the first moments of experiencing space after liftoff completes. It considers the wonderment that space travel provides, and what the experience of seeing planets and Earth from a new perspective would be like. He explains, "I really thought if you were out there what would you expect, what would you see if you were on the spaceship going out. And I suddenly realized if you went up there with all preconceived ideas and preprogrammed ideas in your mind you'd probably miss everything. And I realized then, that's how a child works." He continues, "When you look at life through the eyes of a child there is a wonderment, isn't it? Children see the world differently. There are wonders every day: When you see a butterfly flying or when you see a bird flying or when you see anything, it's just a wonderful world for children to see. I thought, as we become older, we become prejudiced and if you can rid of whatever your prejudice is, you just see the world in naivety, without any restriction. It's wonderful for everyone to be able to see everything in life without any prejudice.'

Flautist Ray Thomas' whimsical "Floating" imagines a low-gravity stroll on the moon before an electric reprise of "Eyes of a Child." Drummer Graeme Edge shares, "My favorite track on To Our Children's Children's Children is 'Floating'. As always, you can count on Ray to poke a bit of irreverent fun just when we are all strutting around a little too pompously!"

"I Never Thought I'd Live to Be a Hundred" and its counterpart "I Never Thought I'd Live to Be a Million" consider the passage of time and the experiences and emotions of a long space journey. Hayward remembers their composition: "I never thought I'd be a hundred and I never thought I'd be a million. It was just something that I thought needed to be there in some way to give it some distance, to add to the distance that the album was providing. We were a group that recorded at night when the rest of the world was silent, and I still do that now. I write when I'm the only person in the world that's awake, and that's the way I like it. To have the opportunity putting that dimension into a record now and again in a quiet way is very rewarding. Particularly with those two little songs, I don't think there's anything else on them, just a guitar and voice."

"Beyond" includes instrumental sections performed by Pinder on his heavily customized Mellotron, dubbed the "Pindertron". The song demonstrates the instrument's ability to produce distinctive sounds in addition to orchestral notes and serve as the centerpiece of a track instead of being just a backing instrument. The song uses the Mellotron and stereo panning to create otherworldly effects in order to convey the experience of observing the gas giants while traveling past, taking inspiration from The Planets by Gustav Holst. Tony Clarke remembers the challenge: "I remember thinking, 'Now how do we get the sound of Saturn or Jupiter?'" The song is credited to Edge, although Clarke remembers it being the work of Pinder, created as a prelude to "Out and In".

"Out and In" draws from Pinder's lifelong fascination with space and the night sky. He explains, "It is still one of my favorite songs. This was written 'within me', and draws from the experiences I had as a kid looking up into the night sky." In a 2014 interview, he recounts spending hours gazing at the stars as a child and how his interest was heightened by a pair of UFO experiences. His early passion would earn him the childhood nickname "Mickey the Moonboy".

The songs on side two explore the emotion of space travel, and coming to terms with the isolation and loss of personal connection that a long voyage alone would present. It opens with the rocker "Gypsy (Of a Strange and Distant Time)", which would become the group's show opener in 1969 and 1970.

Ray Thomas' "Eternity Road" opens with the words "Hark, listen, here he comes." In an interview, he explains that the phrases were inspired by his early child experiences in an air raid shelter during World War II: "I was born in 1941 and during the war I was taken down the air raid shelter. There was our family and two other families who were our neighbours. Sometimes the Luftwaffe were all over us before even the sirens came off. Every night my grandmother would go 'Hark' and her friend Mrs. Ackland, next-door, would go 'Listen'. Mrs James lived on the other side would then go 'Here he comes'. So they became known as 'Hark', 'Listen' and 'Here he comes'. So that stuck in my head so that's how I started "Eternity Road." the lyrics "Turning, spinning, catherine wheeling / Forever changing, there's no beginning" make reference to a catherine wheel, a type of firework design that spins. The song features flamenco style guitar flourishes during the crescendos.

Lodge's emotional "Candle of Life" considers loneliness while advocating compassion.

Pinder considers his place in the universe in "Sun Is Still Shining". Pinder explains the song's lyrics "So if you want to play, stay right back on Earth, waiting for rebirth" are intended as a wake up call. One can either wake up and stay centered, or give your attention to worldly distractions. He laments that the latter has prevailed: "It's come to represent the drudgery of the mediocrity in life of our civilization. All of this [technological] greatness has only resulted in the sense of the mundane that prevails."

The album closed with its only single, "Watching and Waiting", sung by Hayward and composed by him and Thomas. The group had high hopes for the song's success. Hayward remembers: "People were always telling me that I needed to write another song to equal 'Nights in White Satin'. When I came up with 'Watching and Waiting' I thought it was one of my best songs at the time, and we all felt sure that it would be a certain hit. When the single failed to sell we were all mystified, although with the benefit of hindsight I do see why it didn't capture the public's imagination in the way 'Nights in White Satin' did." Hayward wrote the song prior to the conception of the album's theme, and made modifications to align it with the space travel theme. He remembers, "To tie it in with the theme, I changed it to make it, you know, [about] a being from a lost world. A beautiful, lonely world. I altered it from being just a straight love song, to give it that dimension for the sake of the album. Probably I made it much more obscure than it needed to be, but it still moves me, and I'm not sure that I can explain why. I feel every single word of it, it invokes images within me that I find particularly moving. It does have a spiritual dimension to it, a religious-almost dimension to it."

== Recording ==
The album was largely recorded at Decca Studio One in West Hampstead in May, June and July 1969 with additional overdubs in August and final mixing in September 1969. Tony Clarke once again served as producer with engineer Derek Varnals. According to Varnals' records, the backing tracks for songs "Gypsy", "Eyes of a Child" (I and II), "Sun is Still Shining", "Watching and Waiting", "Floating" and "Beyond" all date from May. "Candle of Life" was recorded at Wessex Sound Studios on 25 June. "Out and In" was recorded 11 and 12 July and "Eternity Road", "Higher and Higher" and "I Never Thought I'd Live to Be a Hundred/Million" were recorded 29–31 July, all at West Hampstead. Like its predecessor, On the Threshold of a Dream, the album was recorded on Decca's new Sculley 8-track recording equipment.

The careful production, layers of overdubs and lush instrumentation made the album difficult to reproduce live in concert. The Moody Blues were able to perform only "Gypsy" live at the time of its release, leading to a creative decision to strip back the production of their next album, A Question of Balance. Hayward reflects on the situation and remembers the production as "completely obscure and self-absorbed...where we couldn't play the songs on stage – the overdubbing was so impossible, so much, and overlaid." He continues, "I think To Our Children's Children's Children is the one Moodies album that didn't come across on the radio. It didn't jump; it was soft, it was quiet. Everybody was so delicate with it and handling it with kid gloves. The way it was mastered was quiet, and the way it was transferred to disc was delicate. In the end, it ended up getting a little lost. "Watching and Waiting" — when we heard that song in its studio beauty, we thought, 'This is it! All of those people who had been saying to us for the past 3 or 4 years, 'You'll probably just do another "Nights in White Satin" with it' — no! We had shivers up the spine, and that kind of stuff. But when it came out and you heard it on the radio, you kept saying, 'Turn it up! Turn it up!! Oh no, it's not going to make it.' So it didn't happen." Pinder suggests the band aimed too high with the song: "We hoped that a wide audience would be ready for a song like that. Of course, it didn't do well as a single and that was our disappointment. Yet it was one of our most progressive and intricate songs. It embodied so much of what is good about being a human being and living on this planet in this solar system in this universe. How can I put it? It was just too much quality. It was like a Rolls-Royce that was affordable to everyone, but everyone was programmed into thinking that they could never own a Rolls-Royce."

The band remembers the sessions fondly, being intensely creative and also marked by a wonder sense of teamwork. According to Clarke, "The intensity was just tremendous-the camaraderie, the interaction, the second guessing, the fun of it all, and the exploring. I think it shows in the music. I've got happy memories of that album." Pinder adds that the album "still lifts you off the planet. In a sense, it was ahead of its time, as were the moon landings when you look back on them now."

== Album cover ==
The album cover, a gate-fold, features artwork by Phil Travers, who created the group's previous two covers. The album cover reflects the album's theme as a lasting record to be discovered centuries later as an artifact. It depicts a cave painting, but with anachronistic elements including an airplane and rifle. The inner sleeve features a picture of the band around a campfire on a distant planet. Hayward explains, "It was the inside of the sleeve that really said something. We were depicted gathered around a fire in a cave with just musical instruments and a tape machine and outside there was nothing. I don't know where we were, but we were trying to project the thought that we were on a planet that wasn't earth, somewhere that was Utopia for us."

== Release ==
In 1969, the band established their own label Threshold Records under licence to Decca Records. To Our Children's Children's Children was the first of their albums to be released on their own label. Lodge remembers the group's motivation for having their own record company: "We wanted to have our own label, where we didn't have to argue about having gate-fold sleeves or inserts our albums. We saw both music and artwork as a complete package and felt that the advertising and promotion should also become part of this package" He continues, "Total artistic control. It set a precedent for exactly what we wanted to do with our music. Everything had to be right. And not just the music, we didn't want anything to look like it was a sham or a hype." Lodge remembers, "It got to the point where we were doing more and more of the things ourselves. Like we began working up our own designs for the packages. And it got more and more us, so we finally went to them and said, 'How about giving us the complete bill, and you just distribute?' and they said yes! We didn't actually fit into any of the labels. The group and Sir Edward collectively thought of having our own label within Decca. In actual fact, Graeme Edge and I had a meeting with Mick Jagger to see if we could start a label together." The Rolling Stones and the Moody Blues both ended up with their own labels within Decca. Hayward remembers that "the precedent was Apple, The Beatles were the leaders and everybody tended to do what they did. Our idea was an artists' workshop because Decca were prepared to give us studio time and in the end they actually gave us a studio. It did give us control over our own masters and sleeves which was what we really wanted."

== Promotion ==
The group promoted the album through a series of tours of North America and the United Kingdom. One highlight of the band's "Threshold Roadshow" tour of the UK was a performance on 12 December 1969 at the Royal Albert Hall, which was professionally recorded. The concert was released in 1977 on Caught Live + 5 and again as a stand-alone release in 2023.

== Reception ==
To Our Children's Children's Children was critically well-received and sold well, reaching number 2 in the UK Albums Chart and number 14 in the US, their best showing to that date in that country. While the single released from it, "Watching and Waiting", did not do well, "Gypsy (Of a Strange and Distant Time)" became a fan and album oriented rock radio favourite, despite never being released as a single, and remained in the band's concert setlist through the 1970s. The album was mixed and released in both stereo and quadraphonic.

The album played a role in ping-pong diplomacy, and was the first album by a western pop group to be played in China during the Mao Zedong era. In April 1971, English table tennis player Trevor Taylor was invited to play in China as part of the diplomatic mission centered around the sport. He purchased a copy of the record in Singapore en route to the tournament in Red China, and had his interpreter play it in public. He remembers, "They weren't sure about it at first; there are only six records over there and they are all political." It was the first time the audience had heard western popular music, with no exposure to Elvis Presley or The Beatles.

The album was one of those listened to, on cassette tape, by the crew of Apollo 15 in 1971.

== Track listing ==
Side one
No.	Title	Writer(s)	Lead vocals	Length
1.	"Higher and Higher"	Graeme Edge	Pinder (narration)	4:07
2.	"Eyes of a Child I"	John Lodge	Lodge	3:24
3.	"Floating"	Ray Thomas	Thomas	3:02
4.	"Eyes of a Child II"	Lodge	Lodge	1:20
5.	"I Never Thought I'd Live to Be a Hundred"	Justin Hayward	Hayward	1:05
6.	"Beyond"	Edge	instrumental	2:59
7.	"Out and In"	Mike Pinder, Lodge (Note: CD versions of the album credit Pinder only.)	Pinder	3:50

Side two
No.	Title	Writer(s)	Lead vocals	Length
1.	"Gypsy (Of a Strange and Distant Time)"	Hayward	Hayward	3:33
2.	"Eternity Road"	Thomas	Thomas	4:19
3.	"Candle of Life"	Lodge	Lodge, Hayward	4:15
4.	"Sun Is Still Shining"	Pinder	Pinder	3:40
5.	"I Never Thought I'd Live to Be a Million"	Hayward	Hayward	0:34
6.	"Watching and Waiting"	Hayward, Thomas	Hayward	4:16

== Personnel ==
- Justin Hayward – vocals, guitars, sitar
- John Lodge – vocals, bass guitar, harp, cello, acoustic guitar
- Ray Thomas – vocals, flute, tambourine, bass flute, oboe
- Graeme Edge – drums, percussion
- Mike Pinder – vocals, Mellotron, piano, EMS VCS 3, Hammond organ, acoustic guitar, celesta, double bass

== Additional personnel ==
Sources:

- Producer – Tony Clarke
- Engineers – Derek Varnals / Adrian Martins / Robin Thompson
- Art – Phil Travers
- Photography – David Wedgbury

== Charts ==
Chart (1969–1970)	Peak position
Canada Top Albums/CDs (RPM)	11
French Albums (SNEP)	10
Italian Albums (Musica e Dischi)	19
UK Albums (Official Charts)	2
US Billboard 200	14

== Certifications ==
Region	Certification	Certified units/sales
Canada (Music Canada)	Platinum	100,000^{^}
United States (RIAA)	Gold	500,000^{^}
^{^} Shipments figures based on certification alone.
