= On the Threshold of a Dream =

Studio album by the Moody Blues
- Released: 25 April 1969 (UK) / May 1969 (US/Canada)
- Recorded: 12–31 January 1969
- Studios: Decca, London
- Genre: Progressive rock
- Length: 36:59
- Label: Deram
- Producer: Tony Clarke

The Moody Blues chronology
In Search of the Lost Chord (1968)	On the Threshold of a Dream (1969)	To Our Children's Children's Children (1969)

Singles from On the Threshold of a Dream
- 1. "Never Comes the Day" Released: 2 April 1969

On the Threshold of a Dream is the fourth album by the Moody Blues, released in April 1969 on the Deram label. The album reached the top of the album charts, the group's first No. 1 album in the UK. According to guitarist Justin Hayward, "I think Threshold is the defining album for the Moody Blues. And it's the one in the '60's that you would find in people's homes when you went, they would have that album."

== Background ==
The album was recorded in January 1969 after concluding the group's first tour of North America. Released in April 1969, nine months after its predecessor, In Search of the Lost Chord and seven months before its successor, To Our Children's Children's Children, the album marked a busy time of rapid creative output from the band. Guitarist Justin Hayward remembers, "We were on a fast train in the '60s with our heads down, plowing away at this stuff, never really doing that much on the road. Just going back in the studio and moving forward."

== Writing ==
Like its predecessors, On the Threshold of a Dream is a concept album, but carries a looser theme than Days of Future Passed and In Search of the Lost Chord. The album's title reflects the hopes of the flower power zeitgeist and Woodstock free-love era, and the hope that society was on the cusp of a new era of consciousness, a new enlightenment. The title was coined by Mike Pinder in conversation with his friend and BBC presenter David Symonds. Pinder remembers, "About halfway through making the album, when we were kicking some titles around, I remember talking about how here we are, we'd just come through '67 in kaftans; everybody was out in the street and it was a fun time, and flower power and all that kind of thing. So, we were thinking, 'Hey, we're on the brink of a new consciousness, a new way of looking at things.' And so we were talking about that, and it was like we were 'on the verge of a human dream, a dream of humanity', and Dave said 'threshold', and I came up with 'of a dream', and it was like perfect." Guitarist Justin Hayward continues, "We probably were [taking ourselves too seriously]. But quite rightly. To do what we were doing we had to believe in it. It was from the heart. But at the time we got the reputation for that. I felt I was speaking for a lot of other people in the late '60s. I wanted to write about our search for enlightenment, as simple as that. I'm still kind of doing it."

Bassist John Lodge remembers the band's creative process, how each member would bring ideas to the group related to the album's theme, and then work on the songs together as they produced the album: "Collectively we all had the same subject. But because we were all different people and we all played different things and would sound differently, every song was different even though the subject was the same." He continues, "When we came into the studio, we had a coffee table; we used to sit around there and talk about a song. If I had written a song I wanted on the album, I played it to the rest of the guys when we sat around that table, and everyone around that table would put their interpretation into that song. As soon as you played the song to the rest of the guys, it really became a Moody Blues song. You had total faith in the rest of the guys that they were going to be as creative as they can be in making that song work to its highest degree."

The album begins with a spoken word introduction inspired by René Descartes's philosophical argument Cogito, ergo sum, where the narrator questions and then confirms his own existence, and then questions the meaning of his existence. Written by drummer Graeme Edge, keyboardist Mike Pinder remembers the introduction's production being a collaborative effort among the group's members. "In the Beginning" features three characters, listed as "First Man", "Establishment" and "Inner Man" in the printed lyrics provided in the album gate-fold sleeve. Hayward takes the role of a slightly bemused lone person who confirms his own existence. Edge, a mocking establishment figure, confirms the first man's existence, but insists his purpose is to be a cog in a corporate machine. The first man sheepishly asserts that he thinks his existence is about more than that, finding encouragement from his "Inner Man, spoken by Pinder, who tells him to "keep cool" and "keep thinking free."

The upbeat "Lovely to See You" opens the album. With its welcoming lyrics, the song later served as a concert opener during the later part of the group's career.

The lyrics of "Dear Diary" reflect on a feeling of being unable to relate to the world as it rushes by around you. The song presents a bit of cutting social commentary by closing with a mundane diary entry recounting a day of posting letters and window shopping followed by a subdued recounting that "Somebody exploded an H-bomb today...But it wasn't anybody I knew" as the song fades out. Engineer Derek Varnals remembers Thomas adlibbing the final narration during recording. When mixing the album, Varnals was careful to fade out the track at the right moment for maximum effect: "Yeah, we wanted to keep that in because it was witty and quite amusing. All we had to do was to get the timing right on the fade out. We didn't want it to be too loud - it had to be part of the fade, and I think we got it right."

The upbeat "Send Me No Wine" and "To Share Our Love" are both written by bassist John Lodge. The lyrics of "Send Me No Wine" reflect a country music style. Varnals suggests, "'Wine' is really a country and western song. When you play it, imagine it slower, with some of the repetition taken out. Listen to the song and note that the Mellotron parts are very much like a pedal steel guitar as well."

Mike Pinder's "So Deep Within You" was later recorded by the Four Tops with instrumental backing by members of the Moody Blues.

Side two opens with Hayward's "Never Comes the Day", an ode to unrequited love. He remembers the song being influenced by his struggles to find meaning in his life at the time: "It was quite a difficult time in my life. It was a real painful situation for someone who was as young as me then. I wasn't quite sure about my own life and what I was doing and what was weird and where I was living and the people around me, including the people in the group. I was just kind of questioning everything and at the same time trying to live out some of the philosophies of the time. It was a time of strong philosophical roads and routes that people were writing about. It was a kind of age of enlightenment and searching for enlightenment." The song's plaintive mood builds to a crescendo with an exhortation for listeners to share their feelings with each other. He explains, "I felt it needed to build to something that was happier and more optimistic. It just came naturally to me. I like dynamics in songs: light and shade. I liked starting quiet and getting loud." The song employs an open G tuning, which Hayward remembers learning while touring with Richie Havens: "I learned a lot in those early years about chords, open tunings. "Question," which is a big open C tuning, and "Never Comes a Day," an open G. We played a few times with Richie Havens, and he showed me quite a few tunings backstage at gigs on that lovely good old guitar of his."

Ray Thomas' "Lazy Day" and Hayward's "Are You Sitting Comfortably" introduce a mood of drowsiness, preparing the listener for Mike Pinder's "Have You Heard" suite.

"Lazy Day" incorporates a bit of satire, poking fun at those who while away their days in a sense of contentment. With the line "must be lamb today because beef was last week" the re-release liner notes describe the lyrics as "an acerbic comment on the average Sunday for the British working man". The contentment of the verses is contrasted with ethereal yet cynical backing vocals: "It's such a crying shame / Week after week the same / That's how your life goes by / Until the day you die"

According to Hayward, "Are You Sitting Comfortably" is "about storytelling, but elevated to a bit of a psychedelic story". Its lyrics recall the days of medieval minstrels, featuring finger-picked guitar and lyrics full of vibrant imagery including "a fleet of golden galleons on a crystal sea" and the "glorious days of Camelot" while Merlin casts a spell of slumber. The song takes its first line from a popular children's show, Listen with Mother, that always began with the same line and became associated with the phrase. "Are You Sitting Comfortably" was written towards the end of the sessions, and apart from "The Dream", was the last track recorded for the album. Hayward remembers, "I already had the guitar riff and the chord sequence, and I had the first line and the title. And then we just took it from there. Ray contributed a lot of lyrics. I know the first thing he did was that second line, "A fleet of golden galleons, on a crystal sea," which is a very Ray Thomas phrase."

Mike Pinder's recitation of Graeme Edge's poem "The Dream" introduces the album's dream sequence. Its words suggest that just as new life springs from death in nature, a spirit of love and selflessness can help society realize its dream and achieve enlightenment. Edge explains, "My job back then was to write a poem that kind of hinted at all of the various themes to make sure that people's heads were pointed in the right direction."

"Have You Heard" dates from at least 1966, when an early version appeared in the band's live set. Its lyrics repeat the album's theme of enlightenment. The song bookends "The Voyage", an instrumental piece that builds with Mellotron-produced orchestral strings and reaches a crescendo with a repeated melody on piano before cellos lead a transition back to a reprise of "Have You Heard". Varnals remembers the introductory section of "The Voyage" being influenced by Also sprach Zarathustra, having been used in 2001: A Space Odyssey, which was released several months before the album's sessions. The track took three days to record, with Mike Pinder largely working alone on Mellotron, with overdubbed cellos, piano and other instruments played by the group.

At the end of the "Have You Heard" reprise, the album concludes with the droning electronic sound that opens the album. Produced by Mellotron, the sound plays continuously into the album's run-out groove, causing it to play continuously until the record player's tonearm is lifted.

== Recording ==
The album was recorded from 12 to 31 January 1969, once again at Decca's Studio One at their West Hampstead studio with producer Tony Clarke and engineer Derek Varnals, employing the studio's newly installed Sculley 8 track recording equipment. Final mixing on the album was completed on 3 and 4 February. The sessions typically ran from the afternoon until well into the night, with the creative team sequestering themselves inside of the studio. Producer Tony Clarke remembers, "We brought in carpets and lamps and ashtrays and recorded in the dark. It had to be comfortable and cozy. The sessions tended to go from midday until midnight."

Justin Hayward remembers, "It was certainly a time for me when I was sort of searching and seeking different religions, psychedelic experiences; it was a real time of discovery for me as a young man. So, I was getting stoned a lot and going deeper into music and things. I certainly saw it as a real chance at musical freedom on this record...a way to express the sort of searching, seeking things that we were doing in our lives."

Drummer Graeme Edge remembers the creative environment: "The album was our one where we actually concentrated on recording and weren't rushing off to do gigs here and there. As we'd just come off tour the music we created combined the knowledge of studio techniques that we had acquired recording In Search of the Lost Chord together with the craft we had learnt through performing on stage every night. That may explain the presence of On The Threshold Of A Dream of more instrumental parts."

The opening "In the Beginning" in particular offered much opportunity for the group plus Clarke and Varnals to express their studio creativity. The album begins and ends with "the sound of everything but also of nothing", created by producing high and low frequencies on the Mellotron combined with "pink noise": Varnals explains, "We chose the pitch and put lots of reverb on it to make it sound everywhere and nowhere, if you like. It worked and seemed quite atmospheric." To back up Graeme Edge's maniacal establishment-computer voice during the spoken section, the group placed everyone's ticking wristwatches and placed them inside a funnel with a microphone. The sound was combined with the sound of the clanking rotating spindle that made up the internal mechanics of a Mellotron. The overall effect intended to mimic machinery and the vibes a mad professor bent on domination.

John Lodge reflects on how the group's creative process evolved on the album: "I think with On The Threshold Of A Dream and To Our Children's Children's Children, we started to become a studio band. We were exploring what you could do recording-wise, and not playing live-wise. So, we would experiment in all other places to try to make different sounds which we recorded completely differently. It was an interesting time because we pulled the elastic on our musical travels as far as we could go, I think." Clarke adds, "This album set the standard for how we recorded future concept albums. It's quite important in so many ways. It was the first time we had true freedom in the studio. This was our first chance at being left alone - no men in white coats or people with clipboards. It's still quite lovely. I'm proud of a great deal of it. All in all, I'm glad we did it."

== Album cover ==
The album cover, like its predecessor, is designed by Phil Travers. For the first time, the album incorporates a gate-fold sleeve allowing a larger canvas for album artwork. The band would repeat this practice on their next several albums. Flautist Ray Thomas remembers negotiating with their record label, Decca, over the additional cost: "They were concerned that it would increase the cost of the sleeve by 2 pence an album. We were originally told by the head of production that if the album was as good as we said it was, it could be housed in a brown paper bag! Eventually, after a great deal of protest we managed to get our way." The additional space allowed for inclusion, for the first time, the album's lyrics, as well as an essay by composer Lionel Bart.

The imagery on the cover features "a metallic, robot-type entity clutching different, various life forms and squeezing tight representing freedom of thought and expression and creativity", explains Mike Pinder, as well as an image of Merlin casting a spell, Camelot, and a fleet of golden galleons on a crystal sea, images inspired by the lyrics to "Are You Sitting Comfortably". Bassist John Lodge recalls, "We would get our graphic artist, Phil Travers, in to the studio to listen to each track as it was completed. We also gave him the lyrics in order for him to get further ideas. Phil would then sketch out various rough sleeve designs and we would all sit around a coffee table and discuss what we wanted. We all felt that both the music and the album sleeve design had to be part of one special package and had to be right".

== Release ==
Professional ratings
Review scores
Source	Rating
AllMusic	4.5/5 stars
Robert Christgau	D−

On the Threshold of a Dream was released on 25 April 1969 in the UK and 30 May 1969 in the US. On the Threshold of a Dream provided the Moody Blues with their first British number-one album, and also boosted their American fortunes by becoming their first top-20 album there. It proved to be one of the group's more enduring records in the US, staying in the Billboard LPs chart for more than two and a half years.

The album, along with the subsequent To Our Children's Children's Children, was among the tapes carried by Apollo 15 astronaut Al Worden to the moon.

In March 2006 the album was completely remastered into SACD format and repackaged with nine extra tracks. In 2008 a remaster for standard audio CD was issued with the same bonus tracks.

== Track listing ==
Side One
No.	Title	Writer(s)	Lead vocals	Length
1.	"In the Beginning"	Graeme Edge	Hayward, Pinder, Edge (narration)	2:08
2.	"Lovely to See You"	Justin Hayward	Hayward	2:35
3.	"Dear Diary"	Ray Thomas	Thomas	3:56
4.	"Send Me No Wine"	John Lodge	Hayward, Lodge, Thomas, Pinder	2:20
5.	"To Share Our Love"	Lodge	Pinder, Lodge	2:54
6.	"So Deep Within You"	Mike Pinder	Pinder	3:07

Side Two
No.	Title	Writer(s)	Lead vocals	Length
1.	"Never Comes the Day"	Hayward	Hayward	4:43
2.	"Lazy Day"	Thomas	Thomas, Hayward	2:43
3.	"Are You Sitting Comfortably"	Hayward, Thomas	Hayward	3:29
4.	"The Dream"	Edge	Pinder (narration)	0:57
5.	"Have You Heard (Part 1)"	Pinder	Pinder	1:30
6.	"The Voyage"	Pinder	instrumental	3:58
7.	"Have You Heard (Part 2)"	Pinder	Pinder	2:32

== Personnel ==
- Justin Hayward – vocals, guitars, cello, Mellotron (7)
- John Lodge – vocals, bass guitar, cello, double bass
- Ray Thomas – vocals, harmonica, flute, tambourine, oboe, piccolo, EMS VCS 3
- Graeme Edge – drums, percussion, vocals, EMS VCS 3
- Mike Pinder – vocals, Mellotron, Hammond organ, piano, acoustic guitar, cello

=== Additional personnel ===
- Pete Jackson – triangle
- Tony Clarke – producer
- Derek Varnals – recording engineer
- Adrian Martins – assistant engineer
- Phil Travers – cover painting
- David Wedgbury – inside front cover photographs
- Terence Ibbott – inside back cover photographs
- Lionel Bart, David Symonds – sleeve notes

== Charts ==
Chart (1969–1971)	Peak position
Canada Top Albums/CDs (RPM)	26
Dutch Albums (Album Top 100)	11
Finnish Albums (The Official Finnish Charts)	6
French Albums (SNEP)	1
German Albums (Offizielle Top 100)	37
Norwegian Albums (VG-lista)	12
UK Albums (Official Charts)	1
US Billboard 200	20

== Certifications ==
Region	Certification	Certified units/sales
Canada (Music Canada)	Platinum	100,000^{^}
United Kingdom (BPI) release of 2008	Silver	60,000^{^}
United States (RIAA)	Platinum	1,000,000^{^}
^{^} Shipments figures based on certification alone.
