= John Lodge (musician) =

British rock musician (1943–2025)

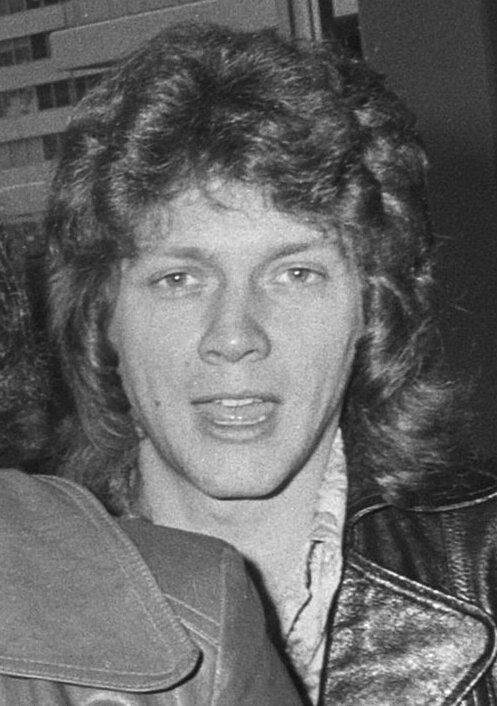
- Lodge in 1970

Background information
- Born: John Charles Lodge; 20 July 1943; Erdington, Birmingham, England
- Died: 10 October 2025 (aged 82) Naples, Florida, U.S.
- Genres: Rock; soft rock; progressive rock; symphonic rock
- Occupations: Musician; singer; songwriter; producer
- Instruments: Bass guitar; vocals
- Years active: 1965–2025
- Labels: Decca; Threshold
- Formerly of: The Moody Blues
- Website: johnlodge.com

John Charles Lodge (20 July 1943 – 10 October 2025) was a English musician who was the bass guitarist, co-lead vocalist, and a songwriter for the longstanding progressive rock band the Moody Blues. Joining the group in 1966, he contributed to many of the Moody Blues' most acclaimed works, including "Ride My See-Saw", "Isn't Life Strange", and "I'm Just a Singer (In a Rock and Roll Band)", helping shape the band's signature symphonic rock sound.

Beyond his work with the Moody Blues, Lodge collaborated with fellow bandmate Justin Hayward on the Blue Jays project in 1974–75, and released the solo albums such as Natural Avenue (1977) and 10,000 Light Years Ago (2015). He also worked as a record producer and remained active in touring and recording throughout his life.

In 2018, Lodge was inducted into the Rock and Roll Hall of Fame as a member of the Moody Blues.

== Early life ==
John Charles Lodge was born on 20 July 1943 (Note: Some sources claim that Lodge was born in 1945 while others state Lodge was born in 1943. This discrepancy seems to stem from an issue on the band's official page. Most obituaries state he died at 82, making the date 1943.) in Birches Green, near Erdington, Birmingham. He was educated at Birches Green Infant and Junior School and Central Grammar School, before pursuing engineering studies at Birmingham College of Advanced Technology. His early influences were musicians such as Buddy Holly and Jerry Lee Lewis. At the age of 14, Lodge met future bandmate Ray Thomas.

== Career ==
=== Early career ===
Lodge was initially involved in the Birmingham music scene alongside Ray Thomas. In the early 1960s they formed the band El Riot and the Rebels. (Note: Lodge had also referred to the band as "El Rumble and the Riots") They performed regularly at a club called Teabury, and it was there Lodge met several other bands including the Beatles and Gerry and the Pacemakers. He took a year off from the music scene to finish his college education before being persuaded to join the Moody Blues.

=== The Moody Blues ===
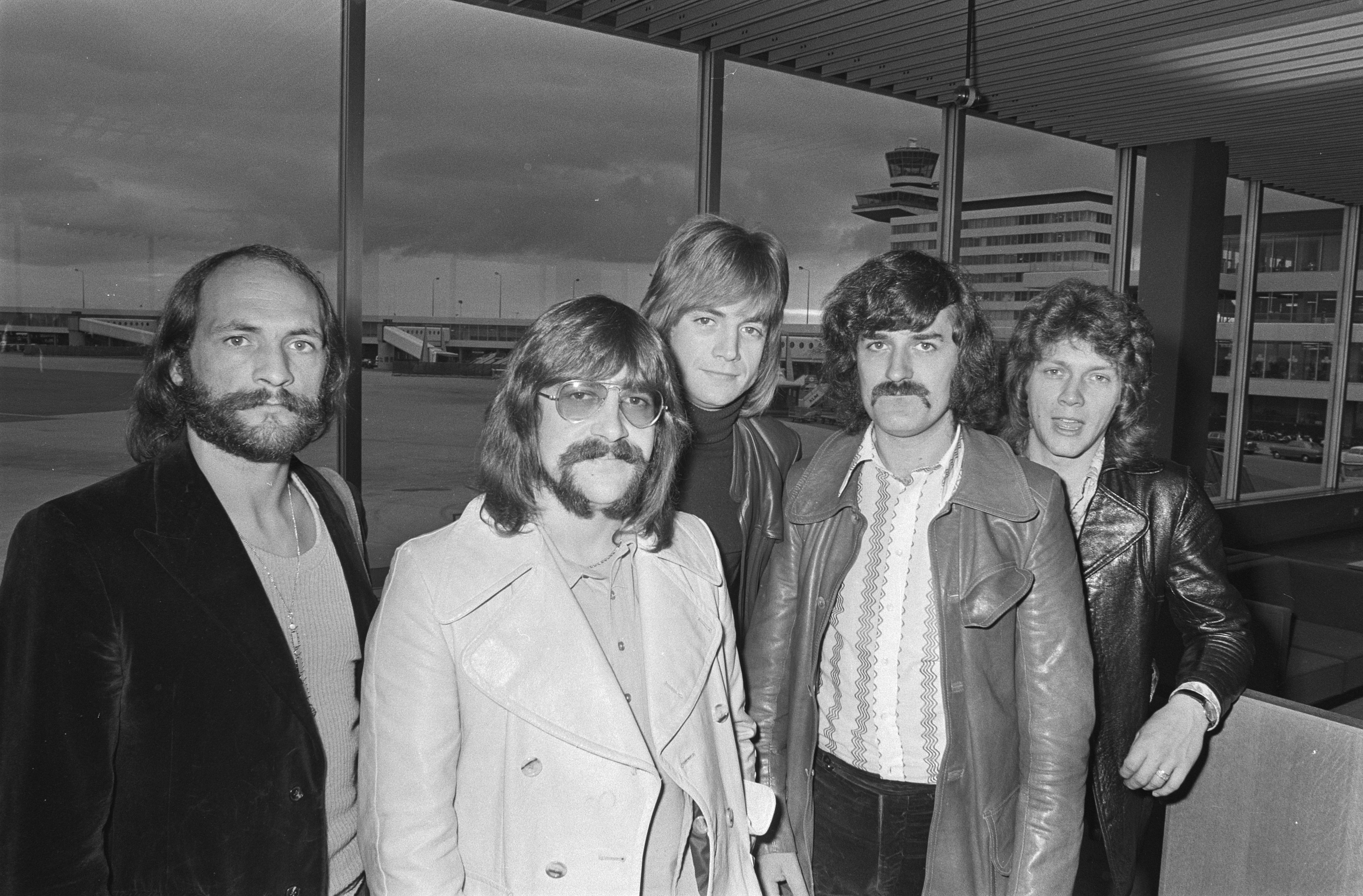
Lodge (far right) with the Moody Blues in 1970

In 1966, Lodge joined the Moody Blues as bassist and vocalist after their original bassist Clint Warwick had left the band, rejoining Ray Thomas during the same period as the band recruited guitarist/vocalist Justin Hayward to replace Denny Laine.

Lodge was one of the primary songwriters of the Moody Blues, writing many songs including "Ride My See-Saw", "Isn't Life Strange" and "I'm Just a Singer (In a Rock and Roll Band)", receiving an ASCAP songwriting award for the latter two. He also wrote "Gemini Dream" alongside Justin Hayward which reached no. 12 on the Billboard Hot 100 charts and also won an ASCAP songwriting award.

In 1980, Lodge released a non-album solo single "Street Cafe" b/w "Threw It All Away" on Decca, produced by Pip Williams, who by that point was best known as a producer for Status Quo. He also co-wrote "Out and In" with Mike Pinder, recorded on To Our Children's Children's Children in 1969.

In 1985, the Moody Blues picked up the Ivor Novello Award for Outstanding Contribution to Music.

Lodge participated in the 2011 bluegrass tribute album to the Moody Blues, Moody Bluegrass TWO...Much Love, as lead vocal on his song "Send Me No Wine". Lodge joined other current and past members of the Moody Blues on this album. Two of Lodge's Moody Blues compositions, "Ride My See-Saw" and "I'm Just a Singer (In a Rock and Roll Band)" are featured on an earlier tribute album, Moody Bluegrass: A Nashville Tribute to the Moody Blues, released in 2004.

=== Other works ===
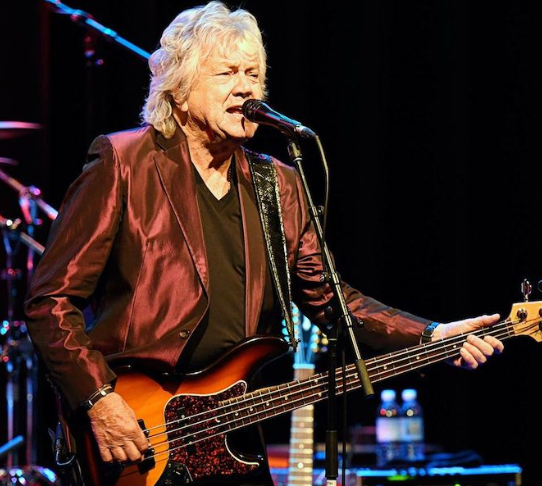
Lodge performing in 2019

Lodge collaborated with fellow Moody Blues member Justin Hayward on the 1975 album Blue Jays. Lodge would later release a solo album, Natural Avenue, in 1977, from which the single "Say You Love Me" was issued. During the 1970s, he produced the band Trapeze's first two albums.

In May 2015, Lodge released a solo album, 10,000 Light Years Ago, which reunited him with Ray Thomas and Mike Pinder. He toured behind the album in 2017 and 2018. In February 2019, Lodge took his solo band onto the "Cruise to the Edge" sailing out of Florida. Lodge and Jon Davison of Yes became friends on board when Davison began dating his daughter Emily. Davison then toured with Lodge as "guest vocalist".

On 2 April 2019, it was announced that Lodge would join Yes on "The Royal Affair Tour" in the middle of 2019, which also included Asia and Carl Palmer's ELP Legacy. In February 2020, Lodge appeared on the "Rock and Romance Cruise" alongside Don Felder, America and other acts before continuing on a 12 date tour. Jon Davison again joined Lodge on stage. The tour ended on 8 March, just before the COVID-19 lockdowns began.

During lockdown Lodge wrote and recorded the song "In These Crazy Times" in his home studio. He recorded the track himself and was joined by his son Kristian on lead guitar, his wife Kirsten on backing vocals and Jon Davison also on backing vocals. His daughter Emily managed the project.

== Personal life and death ==
Lodge was married to his wife, Kirsten, from 1968 until his death. They had two children: Emily, the namesake of "Emily's Song", and Kristian. In 2022, Emily was engaged to Yes vocalist Jon Davison. He spoke publicly about being an evangelical Christian and credited his faith with helping him avoid "the excesses" of the rock music business.

Lodge died on 10 October 2025, aged 82. His death was announced by his family later that day who described it as "sudden and unexpected" and said he was surrounded by loved ones at the time.

== Legacy ==
In 2018, Lodge was inducted into the Rock and Roll Hall of Fame as a member of the Moody Blues. In September 2019, Lodge was given the Lifetime Achievement Award at the Annual Prog Awards by Prog in London.

== Solo discography ==
=== Studio albums ===
- Blue Jays (1975) with Justin Hayward
- Natural Avenue (1977)
- 10,000 Light Years Ago (2015)
- Days of Future Passed – My Sojourn (2023)

=== EPs ===
- Love Conquers All (14 February 2025)

=== Live albums ===
- Live from Birmingham: The 10,000 Light Years Tour (2017)
- The Royal Affair and After (2021)

=== Compilation albums ===
- B Yond – The Very Best of (2019)
