= Danilo Madonia =

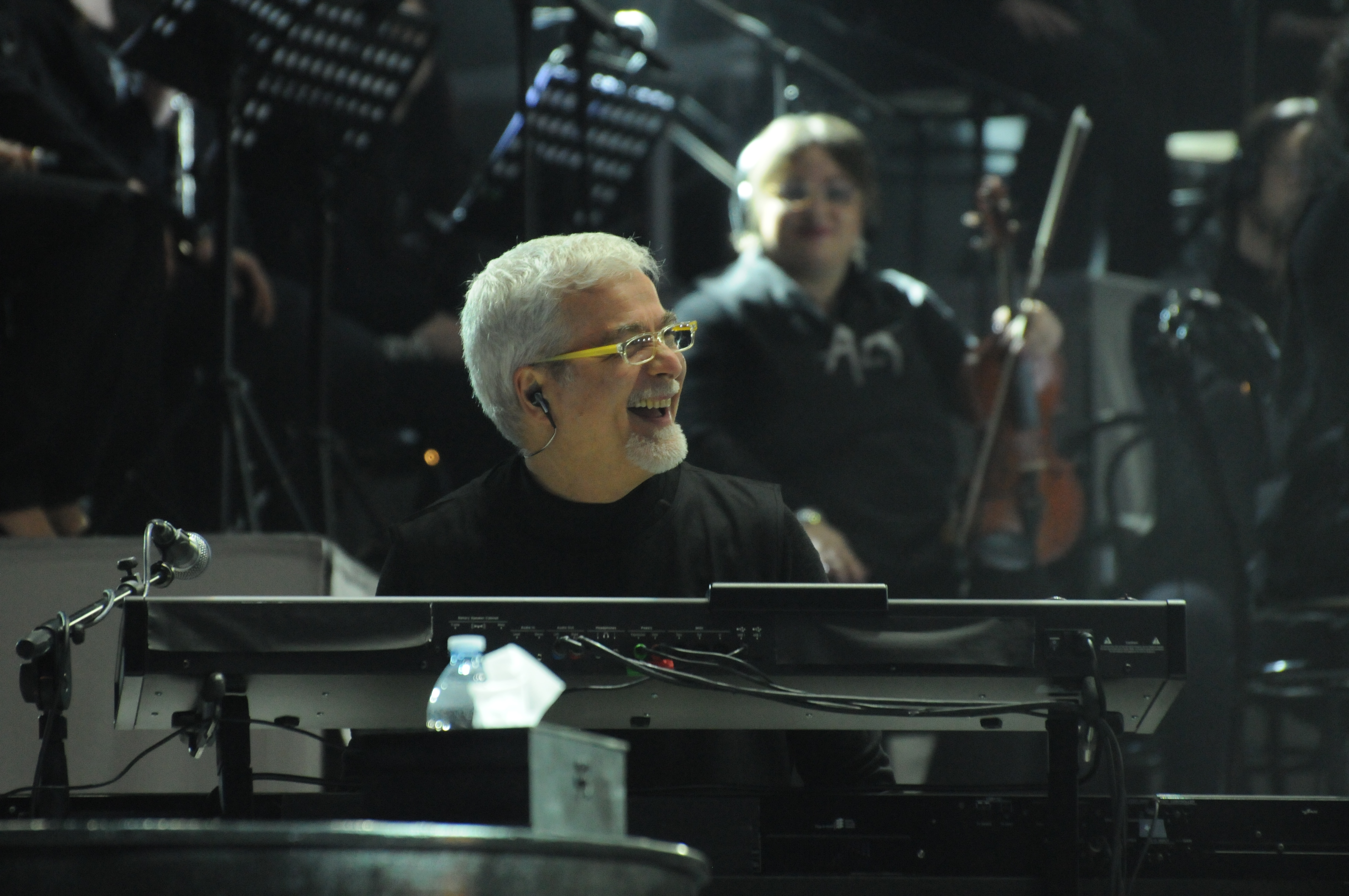

Background information
- Born: 7 April 1958 (age 66); Genoa, Italy
- Genres: Pop, contemporary classical music
- Occupation(s): Musician, composer
- Instrument(s): Piano, organ, synthesizers, guitar
- Years active: 1982–present

Danilo Madonia is an Italian musician, composer, producer and arranger.

== Background ==
Born in Genoa (Italy) in 1958, he began to approach music at a very early age, when his father and mother would record their performances on a small reel-to-reel tape recorder. Madonia started his first musical experiments with his father's guitar. At the age of seven he received a diatonic harmonica, followed by an accordion, after which he approached the study of the piano, after which he decided to attend a conservatory. Rejected by the Conservatory of Genoa due to his age (16 years old were considered too many to start studying the piano), he decided to attend Antonio Vivaldi Conservatory in Alessandria and Giuseppe Verdi Conservatory in Turin, where he met the man who would later become his teacher, pianist Raf Cristiano.

During the same period, Madonia began playing live in underground clubs, night clubs, piano bars and clubs in northern Italy, studying, play and earning some money at the same time. He played with the bands Studio, Immenso Campo di Fragole and Equipage, with whom he recorded a couple of 45s by the end of the 70s.

== 1970s and 1980s ==
In the late 1970s, Madonia started his first experience in the "Studio G" with the soundtrack composer Aldo De Scalzi, on a 3M 2-inch 16-track recorder which they used to produce disco mixes. During a piano bar evening he befriended the Genoese musician Bob Callero, the bass player of the 1970s prog bands (Osage Tribe and Duello Madre, and played with the artists Lucio Battisti, Patty Pravo and Loredana Bertè, Callero offered Madonia a chance to go to Milan and start a tour as keyboard player for Eugenio Finardi in 1982. In the same year he recorded Finardi's album "Dal Blu", for which he wrote the song "Le Ragazze di Osaka", together with Eugenio. Since then, he has worked both in studio and live with the Italian artists Ron, Fiorella Mannoia, Enzo Jannacci, Francesco De Gregori, Eros Ramazzotti and Anna Oxa, working on production and arrangement. At the same time, he started working with computers, starting with a clone of the Apple II, and later with the Macintosh and Performer program, which he still uses today.

== 1990s ==
In 1997 Alberto Parodi, owner of the Mulinetti Studio, helped Madonia begin a collaboration with the British pop-rock band the Moody Blues, as keyboard player, arranger and sound engineer, a collaboration that led to two studio albums, one live album, three 5.1 DVDs and two tours in the United States. In the same year he made soundtracks for major brands' TV commercials, written and produced together with Flavio Ibba, with whom he has also performed live. Since 1998 Madonia has been working with the composers Pivio Pischiutta and Aldo de Scalzi, making soundtracks for films and television programs including Harem Suare by Ferzan Ozpetek and the series Distretto di Polizia (Canale 5) and Medicina Generale (RAI 3).

== 2000s to present ==
In 2003 Madonia moved to Fulham in London, where he lived for about two and a half years. During this period he worked on the Moody Blues' December project, released in 2004, and on productions including the Absolute (Andy Watkins and Paul Wilson), producers of the Spice Girls. In 2005 he returned to Italy and participated in Ron's project "Ma Quando Dici Amore" as a musician and arranger, during which he worked with Claudio Baglioni, Jovanotti, Elisa, Carmen Consoli and Lucio Dalla. The proceeds of the album were donated to research against ALS disease. In 2006 he released his first solo album, called Moving, which he composed and performed during his stay in London. In the same year he met Renato Zero and played keyboards in his album, "Il Dono". Since then, the collaboration with the Roman artist has grown stronger, featuring tours and studio recordings, up to Presente album, where he participated as arranger and co-author of eight songs, and for which received a triple platinum disc. Renato Zero's album "AMO - Capitolo 1," produced by Madonia, Trevor Horn and Celso Valli, was released in March 2013, for which Madonia both produced and co-wrote 10 tracks with Renato.

== Collaborations ==
Madonia has worked on both studio and live projects with the Moody Blues, Renato Zero, Double You, Fiorella Mannoia, Francesco de Gregori, Eric Clapton, Ron, Anna Oxa, Angelo Branduardi, Eros Ramazzotti, Andy Watkins, Paul Wilson, Angoon, Darius, Gaetana, Eugenio Finardi, Lucio Dalla, Adriano Celentano, Claudio Baglioni, Luca Carboni, Raf, Giorgio Gaber, Franco Fasano, Elisa and Carmen Consoli.

== Awards and recognitions ==
In 2008, Madonia was awarded the InSound Trophy Award for Best Keyboard Player of the Year. In 2009, a few weeks after its release, Renato Zero's Presente receives the triple platinum.

== Discography with the Moody Blues ==
- Strange Times (1999)
- Hall of Fame (2000)
- Journey into Amazing Caves (2001)
- December (2003)
- Lovely to See You: Live (2005)

== Discography with other artists ==
- Eugenio Finardi, Dal Blu (1982)
- Eugenio Finardi, Colpi di Fulmine, (1983)
- Eugenio Finardi, Strade, (1983)
- Eros Ramazzotti, Cuori agitati, (1985)
- Loredana Bertè, Carioca, (1985)
- Fiorella Mannoia, Momento delicato, (1985)
- Enzo Jannacci, L'Importante, (1985)
- Fiorella Mannoia, Fiorella Mannoia, (1986)
- Francesco de Gregori, Scacchi e tarocchi, (1986)
- Anna Oxa, Cantautori, (1992)
- Anna Oxa, Dodipetto, (1993)
- Anna Oxa, Cantautori II, (1994)
- Franco Fasano, Qualunque sia la Verità, (1994)
- Anna Oxa, Anna non-si Lascia, (1995)
- Double You, Heaven, 1998
- Ron, Cuori di vetro, (2000)
- Double You, Studio Live, 2002
- Ron, Ma quando dici Amore, (2005)
- Renato Zero, Il Dono, (2005)
- Renato Zero, Renatissimo!, (2006)
- Ron, Quando sarò capace d'Amare, (2008)
- Gaetana, Supermarket, (2009)
- Renato Zero, Presente, (2009)
- Renato Zero, Segreto amore, (2010)
- Renato Zero, Puro spirito, (2011)
- Renato Zero, Amo - Capitolo I, (2013)
- Tony Hadley, Christmas Album (2015)
- Renato Zero, Alt 2016
- Sergio Dalma, Via Dalma III, 2017
- Vincenzo Incenzo, Credo (2018)
- Renato Zero, Zero_Settanta (2019)

== Solo discography ==
- Moving (2006)

== DVD 5.1 ==
- The Moody Blues, Hall of Fame - Live at Royal Albert Hall 2000 (2000)
- The Moody Blues, Lovely to See You: Live (2005)
- The Moody Blues, Live at the Isle of Wight Festival (2007)
- Renato Zero, Zerovone Tour, (2010)
- Renato Zero, SeiZero - Live in Piazza di Siena a Roma, (2011)

== Soundtracks for TV and cinema ==
- La seconda moglie (1998)
- I fetentoni (1999)
- Harem Suare (1999)
- Il tunnel della libertà (2004)
- L'uomo della carità 2006
- Rapidamente (2006)
- Medicina Generale (2007)
- Maradona la mano de Dios (2007)
- Distretto di Polizia (2007)
- Der Todestunnel (2007)
- Don Zeno (2008)
- Barbarossa (2009)
- Carnera (2009)
- Walter Chiari, Fino all'ultima risata (2011)

== Soundtracks for TV commercials ==
- Alfa Romeo, 1996-97-98
- Marlboro, 1997
- Sector, 1997–98
- Banca San Paolo, 1997
- Fiat Croma, 2008
- Intesa San Paolo, 2010
- Alfa Romeo Giulietta, 2011
- Alfa Romeo Giulietta, 2012
- Neo Borocillina, 2012–13
- Fiat 500 X, 2016
- Sperlari, 2018
- Fineco, 2019
- Alfa Romeo White, 2019
- Jeep Lonely Boy, 2019
- Jeep Bird, 2020
- Riva Luxury Yacht, 2020
- Jeep Grand Vagoneer USA, 2021
- FIAT 500 Cult Orange, 2021

== See also ==
- The Moody Blues
