= Mina nᵒ 0 =

Mina No. 0

Studio album by Mina
- Released: 12 November 1999
- Recorded: 1999
- Studio: Studi GSU, Lugano
- Genre: Europop; rock; AC
- Length: 46:13
- Language: Italian
- Label: PDU
- Producer: Renato Zero

Mina chronology
Olio (1999)	Mina No. 0 (1999)	Dalla terra (2000)

Mina No. 0 is a studio album by Italian singer Mina, released on 12 November 1999 by PDU.

== Overview ==
The album is a collection of cover versions of songs by Italian singer Renato Zero, who became its producer. Nine of the ten songs on the album are his authorship, and he also acts as a duet partner with Mina on three compositions.

The name of the album Mina No. 0 is an allusion to the perfume Chanel No. 5, as well as to the surname Renato Zero. In the design of the album, created by Mauro Beletti, the theme of perfumery is also played out, in particular the rigor and conciseness of the design of the famous bottle from Chanel.

The album received mixed reviews from critics, and also took 2nd place in the Italian album chart.

== Track listing ==
No.	Title	Lyrics	Music	Length
1.	"Neri"	Zero	Giulia Fasolino	5:18
2.	"Il cielo"	Zero	Zero	4:42
3.	"I migliori anni della nostra vita"	Guido Morra	Maurizio Fabrizio	5:21
4.	"Fermoposta"	Zero	Zero; Piero Pintucci	3:42
5.	"Galeotto fu il canotto"	Zero	Zero; Roberto Conrado	4:24
6.	"Mi vendo"	Zero	Zero; Caviri	4:55
7.	"Amico"	Zero; Franca Evangelisti	Dario Baldan Bembo	3:58
8.	"Cercami"	Zero	Zero; Gianluca Podio	5:23
9.	"Profumi, balocchi e maritozzi"	Zero	Zero; Pintucci	3:54
10.	"Ha tanti cieli la luna"	Zero	Zero; Conrado	4:34
Total length:				46:13

== Personnel ==
- Mina – vocal
- Gabriele Comeglio – alto saxophone, baritone saxophone, tenor saxophone, arrangement (4, 6)
- Massimiliano Pani – arrangement, backing vocals
- Manù Cortesi – backing vocals
- Giulia Fasolino – backing vocals
- Silvio Pozzoli – backing vocals
- Charly Cinelli – bass
- Massimo Moriconi – double bass
- Alfredo Golino – drums
- Gogo Ghidelli – guitar
- Nicolò Fragile – guitar (10), piano (6), programming
- Alberto Borsari – harmonica
- Danilo Rea – piano, Hammond organ
- Carmine Di – recording, mixing, mastering
- Mauro Parodi – trombone
- Emilio Soana – trumpet

Credits are adapted from the album's liner notes.

== Charts ==
=== Weekly charts ===
Initial weekly chart performance for Mina No. 0
Chart (1999)	Peak position
European Albums (Music & Media)	36
Italian Albums (FIMI)	2

2023 weekly chart performance for Mina No. 0
Chart (2023)	Peak position
Italian Vinyl Albums (FIMI)	4

=== Year-end charts ===
Year-end chart performance for Mina No. 0
Chart (1999)	Position
Italian Albums (FIMI)	22
