= Triangolo =

Single by Renato Zero

from the album Zerolandia
- B-side: "Sesso o esse"
- Released: 1978
- Genre: Disco-pop
- Length: 4:39
- Label: Zerolandia / RCA
- Songwriters: Renato Zero, Mario Vicari
- Producer: Piero Pintucci

Renato Zero singles chronology
"Mi vendo" (1977)	"Triangolo" (1978)	"Il carrozzone" (1979)

Audio
- "Triangolo" on YouTube

"Triangolo" (lit. "Triangle") is a 1978 Italian song composed by Renato Zero and Mario Vicari and performed by Renato Zero. It is the lead single of the album Zerolandia.

The song, which has an ironic and explicit depiction of a sexual threesome between two men and a woman as main theme, raised large controversies at the time of its release.

Zero also recorded the song in Spanish as "Triángulo", with lyrics by Lopez de Toledo, and in English as "Sexy Party". A duet version with Raffaella Carrà was released in the album Sei Zero.

== Track listing ==
No.	Title	Writer(s)	Length
1.	"Triangolo"	Zero, Vicari	4:39
2.	"Sesso o esse"	Franca Evangelisti, Zero, Michele Zarrillo	4:24

== Charts ==
Chart (1978–9)	Peak position
Italy (Musica e dischi)	2

== Certifications ==
Region	Certification	Certified units/sales
Italy (FIMI) Sales since 2009	Platinum	100,000^{‡}
^{‡} Sales+streaming figures based on certification alone.
