= Mi vendo =

Single by Renato Zero

from the album Zerofobia
- B-side: "Morire qui"
- Released: 1977
- Genre: Disco-pop; funk
- Length: 4:39
- Label: Zerolandia / RCA
- Songwriters: Renato Zero, Mario Vicari
- Producer: Piero Pintucci

Renato Zero singles chronology
"Madame" (1976)	"Mi vendo" (1977)	"Triangolo" (1978)

Audio
- "Mi vendo" on YouTube

"Mi vendo" (lit. "I sell myself") is a 1977 Italian song composed by Renato Zero and Mario Vicari and performed by Renato Zero. It is the lead single of the album Zerofobia.

The song's lyrics depict the frustration of Zero for his so far failed music career, and also are an ironical manifesto of his artistic aspirations. The music was inspired by Barry White's disco production of the time. Thanks to the heavy rotation in radio libere (private radio stations which suddenly appeared in Italy following the liberalisation of the radio broadcasting system established by the Constitutional Court in 1976), the song became a surprise hit and marked Zero's commercial breakout.

Zero re-recorded the song numerous times, notably in a duet version with Rita Pavone in the album Sei Zero. An extended version was released in the box album Limited Edition. Mina covered the song in her 1999 album Mina n° 0.

== Track listing ==
No.	Title	Writer(s)	Length
1.	"Mi vendo"	Zero, Vicari	4:14
2.	"Morire qui"	Zero	3:34

== Charts ==
Chart (1977)	Peak position
Italy (Musica e dischi)	8

== Certifications ==
Region	Certification	Certified units/sales
Italy (FIMI) Sales since 2009	Gold	50,000^{‡}
^{‡} Sales+streaming figures based on certification alone.
