= Il carrozzone =

Single by Renato Zero

from the album EroZero
- B-side: "Baratto"
- Released: 1979
- Genre: Ballad
- Length: 4:36
- Label: Zerolandia / RCA
- Songwriters: Piero Pintucci, Franca Evangelisti
- Producer: Piero Pintucci

Renato Zero singles chronology
"Triangolo" (1978)	"Il carrozzone" (1979)	"Amico" (1980)

Audio
- "Il carrozzone" on YouTube

"Il carrozzone" (lit. "The bandwagon") is a 1979 Italian song composed by Piero Pintucci (music) and Franca Evangelisti (lyrics) and performed by Renato Zero. It is the lead single of the album EroZero.

The song, which has death as main theme, had been originally composed for Gabriella Ferri, who refused to record it. It has been described as "a very complex piece in its construction that combines French chanson atmospheres with Nino Rota's soundtracks for Fellini, all remixed in a vaudeville atmosphere, but very direct and folksy in its substance."

Zero re-recorded the song several times, and also recorded the song in Spanish as "La carroza", with lyrics by Buddy Mary McCluskey.

== Track listing ==
No.	Title	Writer(s)	Length
1.	"Il carrozzone"	Pintucci, Evangelisti	4:36
2.	"Baratto"	Evangelisti, Zero, Caviri	4:18

== Charts ==
Chart (1979)	Peak position
Italy (Musica e dischi)	1
