= Live 8 concert, Rome =

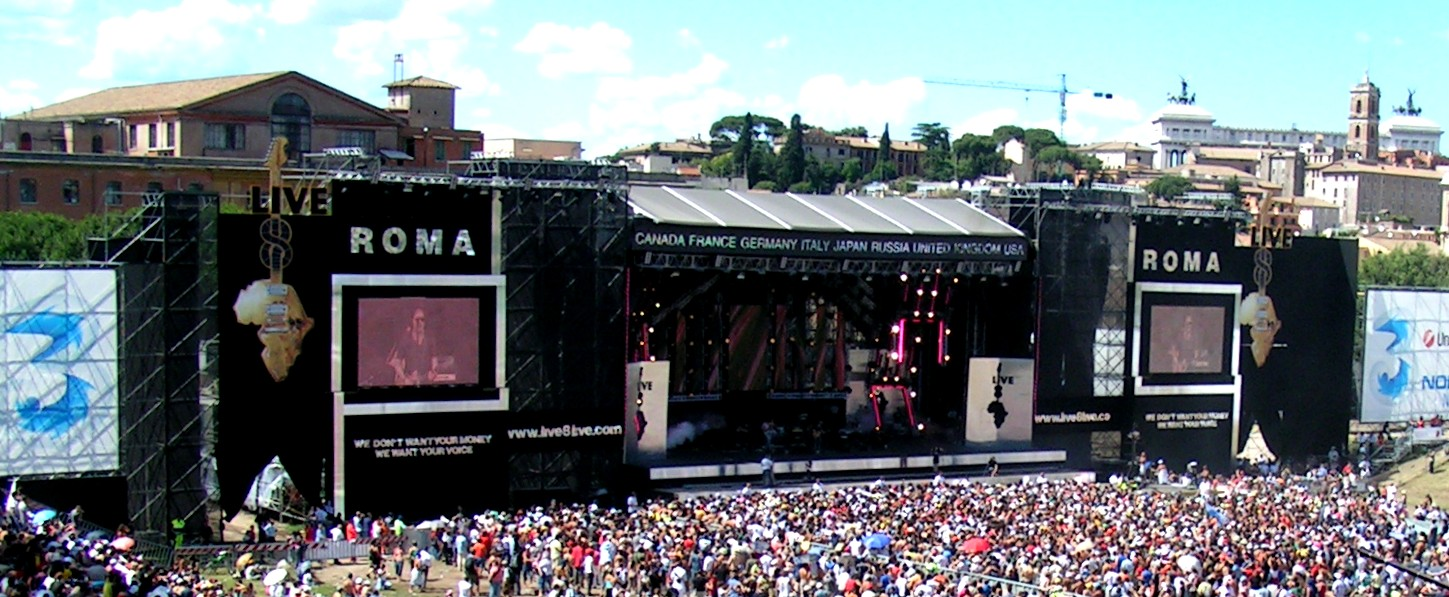

On 2 July 2005, a Live 8 concert was held at the Circus Maximus, Rome, Italy.

The event is also referred to as "Live 8 Rome" or "Live 8 Italy".

== Lineup ==
Past Live Aid performers are listed with an asterisk (*). In order of appearance:

- Zucchero - "Everybody's Gotta Learn Sometime", "Overdose d'amore", "Diavolo in me" (R 15:00)
- Duran Duran* - "(Reach Up for The) Sunrise", "Ordinary World", "Save a Prayer", "The Wild Boys" (R 15:14)
- Elisa - "Luce (Tramonti a Nord Est)", "Una poesia anche per te" (R 15:39)
- Negrita - "Un Mare Di Noia", "Storia Di Mary", "Rotolando Verso Sud", "Cambio" (R 15:53)
- Negramaro - "Mentre Tutto Scorre", "Nuvole E Lenzuola", "Estate" (R 16:15)
- Tim McGraw - "Drugs or Jesus", "Live Like You Were Dying" (R 16:29)
- Faith Hill - "Mississippi Girl", "Breathe", "Piece of My Heart" (R 16:43)
- Planet Funk - "Ultraviolet Boys", "Stop Me", "The Switch" (R 17:09)
- Le Vibrazioni - "Sono Più Sereno", "Vieni Da Me", "Aspettando" (R 17:23)
- Irene Grandi - "Per fare l'amore", "Santissima Janis" (R 17:36)
- Tiromancino - "Imparare dal vento", "Nessuna certezza", "È necessario" (R 17:50)
- Max Pezzali - "La dura legge del gol", "Come mai", "Hanno ucciso l'Uomo Ragno" (R 18:06)
- Alex Britti - "Gelido", "7000 caffè" (R 18:30)
- Cesare Cremonini - "Padre madre", "50 Special" (R 18:45)
- Nek - "Almeno stavolta", "Se io non avessi Te", "Lascia che io sia" (R 18:54)
- Piero Pelù - "Io ci sarò", "Bomba boomerang", "Fela Kuti Improv" (R 19:08)
- Jane Alexander (presenter) (R 19:23)
- Biagio Antonacci - "Immagina", "Liberatemi", "Se io se lei", "Non ci facciamo compagnia" (R 19:27)
- Fiorella Mannoia - "Sally", "Clandestino", "Mio fratello che guardi il mondo" (R 19:43)
- Ligabue - "Non è tempo per noi", "Urlando contro Il cielo", "Il mio nome è mai più" (with Jovanotti and Piero Pelù) (R 19:47)
- Jovanotti - "Una tribù che balla", "L'ombelico del mondo" (R 20:00)
- Laura Pausini - "Un'emergenza d'amore", "Come se non fosse stato mai amore", "Il Mondo Che Vorrei", "Tra Te E Il Mare" (R 20:30)
- Claudio Baglioni - "Le mani e l'anima", "Strada facendo", "La vita è adesso", "Avrai" (R 20:44)
- Paola Cortellesi - (presenter) (R 20:58)
- Mayor of Lampedusa - (presenter) (R 21:00)
- Renato Zero - "Cercami", "Nei giardini che nessuno sa", "I migliori anni della nostra vita" (R 21:04)
- Antonello Venditti - "Che fantastica storia è la vita", "Ci vorrebbe un amico", "Roma capoccia" (R 21:24)
- Noa - "Beauty Of That", "Eye In The Sky" (R 21:42)
- Povia - "I Bambini fanno oh", "Fiori" (R 21:57)
- Velvet - "Il mondo è fuori", "Search And Destroy" (R 22:08)
- Pagani & African Drum Collective - "Heanda", "Stuck Is Stuck" (R 22:22)
- Articolo 31 (R 22:39)
- Gemelli Diversi (R 22:53)
- Pino Daniele (R 23:07)
- Francesco De Gregori (R 23:21)
