= Carnera (disambiguation) =

Carnera is a surname.

Carnera may also refer to:

- Carnera (comics), an Italian comic book series
- Palasport Primo Carnera, an indoor sporting arena in Udine, Italy
