= Amico (song) =

Single by Renato Zero

from the album Tregua
- B-side: "Amore sì, amore no"
- Released: 1980
- Length: 4:54
- Label: Zerolandia / RCA
- Songwriters: Dario Baldan Bembo, Renato Zero, Franca Evangelisti

Renato Zero singles chronology
"Il carrozzone" (1979)	"Amico" (1980)	"Galeotto fu il canotto" (1981)

Audio
- "Amico" on YouTube

"Amico" (literally "Friend") is a 1980 Italian song composed by Dario Baldan Bembo (music), Renato Zero and Franca Evangelisti (lyrics) and performed by Renato Zero.

The song marked the first collaboration between Zero and Baldan Bembo, who later penned other Zero's hits such as "Più su" and "Spiagge". The song was a last minute addition to the album Tregua, with Zero so impressed by the music that he chose the song as the album's lead single.

The single was a massive success, staying in the Italian hit parade for four months. Zero re-recorded the song several times, notably in Figli del sogno in a duet with Michele Zarrillo and in Arenà in a duet with Francesco Renga. Mina covered the song in her 1999 album Mina n° 0.

== Track listing ==
No.	Title	Writer(s)	Length
1.	"Amico"	Baldan Bembo, Zero, Evangelisti	4:54
2.	"Amore sì, amore no"	Zero, Roberto Conrado	4:51

== Charts ==
Chart (1980–1)	Peak position
Italy (Musica e dischi)	1
Chart (2006)	Peak position
Italy (FIMI)	32

== Certifications ==
Region	Certification	Certified units/sales
Italy (FIMI) Sales since 2009	Gold	35,000^{‡}
^{‡} Sales+streaming figures based on certification alone.
