= Un-D-Nyable Entertainment =

- Founded: 1996
- Founder: Frank Thomas
- Status: Inactive
- Distributor: Navarre Corporation
- Genre: Hip hop, R&B
- Location: Chicago, Illinois

Un-D-Nyable Entertainment is a record label founded by Frank Thomas (“The Big Hurt”), the star player and home run hitter of the Chicago White Sox.

== Label history ==
In the fall of 1996, after funding the development of a number of producers in Atlanta for roughly three years, Frank felt it was time to move things to the next level. He moved the producers to Chicago, leased two floors in a downtown Chicago office building that had recently been the studios for a PBS radio station, WBEZ, and equipped it with high quality industry standard recording equipment.

I want to bring back that Motown flavor. Frank said, "I'm sure we'll sign a few rap artist, but we really want to go with that old flavor, that forever music. I think there's been a void in the last six or seven years of good songs that will be here forever and artist that will be here forever."

The first artist signed to Un-D-Nyable was Virgo Williams. Virgo was the featured vocalist on a Sony/So So Def Records album release "So So Def Bass All Stars" that sold over 560,000 units in the US. The hit single was "My Boo", featuring Virgo.

In 1997, Paul David Wilson accepted an offer from Frank, to serve as President of Un-D-Nyable Entertainment. Paul agreed to run the label in partnership with Thomas.

Said Wilson,

We will be with them as guides though this and though life. We're not just throwing the artist out there, because three are just too many pitfalls. We will take care of their careers while we keep them focused on what's really important in life.

Their initial release was a CD single entitled “3-5, The White Sox Got’em Open Up Wide,” with Frank Thomas featuring D. Stoy. Jet magazine wrote:

Chicago White Sox star Frank Thomas definitely has plans to make more hits in the Windy City with the formation of his new Chicago-based enterprise, Un-D-Nyable Entertainment, Inc.

In June 1997, Un-D-Nyable, with Wilson, signed 15-year-old Dejah Gomez to an exclusive recording contract.

In 1998, Chicago quartet Entourage (James “Slique” Adams , Floyd Massey, Eric "Papi312" Wade and Irone Guyton, a R&B singing group) was signed to the label, followed by rap artist Ant-Dub and STRONG, an R&B group that was a family of five brothers.

In late 1998, Wilson and Thomas produced the debut CD for Dejah Gomez (“Dejah”) and Entourage (“The Fall Backs of a Playa”) and matching videos for the CD songs and a CD single title “I Can’t Hide” featuring STRONG. In December, a single “When,” by Entourage, they charted on Billboard. Soon, both Dejah and Entourage were starting to “take off,” but, in January 1999, just as the action and excitement was building for his young record company, Wilson suffered a stroke. Thomas subsequently did not renew Wilson's contract.

"Frank's vision always was for Un-D-Nyable to have a street hip-hop kind of a vibe," Regina Daniel, a publicist who has represented Un-D-Nyable. "Where Paul was leading it was not necessarily where Frank's vision was." Danielle Dickerson, Promotions Manager of the label, she said "the company's problems had more to do with the inherent difficulty of competing against the major companies than any failure by Un-D-Nyable." On June 25, 1999, the main office were closed due to poor record sales and lack of funding. Three months later in September, 1999 the studio equipment was sold and the Un-D-Nyable Recording studio was closed.

== Albums ==
| Year | Title | Artist |
|---|---|---|
| 1998 | Dejah | Dejah |
| 1998 | The Fall Backs of a Playa | Entourage |
| 1999 | STRONG | STRONG |

== Singles ==
| Year | Title | Artist |
|---|---|---|
| 1997 | 3-5, The White Sox Got’em Open Up Wide | Frank Thomas featuring D. Stoy |
| 1998 | Just A Lil’ But | Dejah |
| 1998 | Page Me | Entourage |
| 1998 | Krazy | Dejah |
| 1998 | When | Entourage |
| 1999 | I Can’t Hide | STRONG |
| 1999 | Mi Amiga | STRONG |
