= Amo – Capitolo I =

2013 studio album by Renato Zero

Studio album by Renato Zero
- Released: 12 March 2013
- Recorded: London, Rome and Budapest
- Genre: Rock, blues, pop, Dance
- Length: 60:03
- Label: Tattica/IndipendenteMente
- Producer: Trevor Horn, Celso Valli, Danilo Madonia

Renato Zero chronology
Puro spirito (2011)	Amo – Capitolo I (2013)	Amo – Capitolo II (2013)

Singles from Amo – Capitolo I
- 1. "Chiedi di me" Released: 1 March 2013

Amo – Capitolo I is the 27th studio album by Renato Zero. It was released on 12 March 2013.

The album is about love, friendship and memories. The tracks of love are : Il nostro mondo, Voglia d'amare, Oramai and Vola Alto. Then, there are track like Chiedi di me, Una canzone da cantare avrai, Angelina, Lu, I '70, Un'apertura d'ali talk about Renato's memories and friends of the past (like Lucio Dalla, Giancarlo Bigazzi and Angelina, the concierge of the palace where Renato lived as a young man).

On 1 March 2013, the first single from the album, "Chiedi di me", was released. The album was certified platinum by the Federation of the Italian Music Industry.

== Track listing ==
No.	Title	Writer(s)	Length
1.	"Chiedi Di Me"	Renato Zero, Danilo Madonia, Vincenzo Incenzo, Renato Zero	4:14
2.	"Una Canzone Da Cantare Avrai"		5:08
3.	"Il Nostro Mondo"		4:22
4.	"Voglia D'Amare"		4:14
5.	"Angelina"		4:05
6.	"Lu"	Renato Zero	3:59
7.	"I '70"		4:13
8.	"Un'Apertura D'Ali"		4:34
9.	"La Vacanza"		4:29
10.	"Oramai"		5:00
11.	"Tutto Inizia Sempre Da Un Sì"		4:38
12.	"Vola Alto"		4:14
13.	"Dovremmo Imparare A Vivere"		2:40
14.	"La Vita Che Mi Aspetta"	Francesco Morettini and Luca Angelosanti	4:13
Total length:			60:03

== Musicians ==
- Renato Zero – vocals
- Danilo Madonia – piano, backing vocals, keyboards, programming, accordion
- Massimo Varini – acoustic guitar, electric guitar
- Phil Palmer – acoustic guitar, electric guitar
- Giorgio Secco – acoustic guitar, electric guitar
- Samuele Dessì – acoustic guitar, electric guitar
- Paolo Valli – drums
- Tommy Ruggero – percussions
- Julian Hinton – keyboards, organ, piano, programming
- Trevor Horn – bass
- Cesare Chiodo – bass
- Lele Melotti – drums
- Paolo Costa – bass
- Danilo Rea – piano
- Tom Sheret – soprano saxophone
- Fabrizio Bosso – trumpet
- Simon Bloor – organ
- Luis Jardim – percussions
- Everton Nelson – first violin
- Anselmo Cerriana – first violin
- Marco Ferrari – second violin
- Beppe Francese – viola
- Giulio Glavina – cello
- Elio Venali – contrabass
- Paola Montanari – backing vocals
- Paolo Foti – backing vocals
- Rinaldo Zuliani – backing vocals
- Antonio Mameli – backing vocals
- Giuliano Mazzini – backing vocals
- Cesidio Iacobone – backing vocals
