= December (The Moody Blues album) =

2003 studio album by The Moody Blues

Studio album by The Moody Blues
- Released: 28 October 2003
- Recorded: November 2002 – August 2003; Mulinetti Studios, Italy
- Genres: Rock, Christmas
- Length: 42:08
- Label: Universal
- Producers: Justin Hayward & John Lodge

The Moody Blues chronology
Hall of Fame (2000)	December (2003)	Gold (2005)

Singles from December
- 1. "December Snow" Released: November 2003

Professional ratings
Review scores
Source	Rating
Allmusic	3/5 stars

December is the sixteenth and final studio album by the Moody Blues, released in 2003. It is their only Christmas album. Though they decided against recording any further albums following its release, the band continued to tour intermittently until 2018.

== Background ==
In a November 2005 interview, bassist John Lodge explained the decision to record a Christmas album: "The Christmas album came about because all of our albums are theme albums. And Christmas is one of the greatest themes for everyone. Another reason is because we thought it would be nice to show The Moody Blues' commitment to the holiday period." He further explained the inspiration for the songs on the album, as well as the choice of covers: "Christmas is a focus point and it's interesting to be able to contribute our thoughts to that period — not just Christmas presents and parties, but how we relate to what's happening in the world today. And with the Lennon/Ono "Happy Xmas (War Is Over)", there was a statement we wanted to make."

Regarding "The Spirit of Christmas", Lodge said, "I leave guitars everywhere. In my office I have a Gibson Dove guitar, probably from 1962, which I love. I was in my office and the television was on and I saw all the fighting in the Middle East on the news and I thought, what a strange world that we live in. I turned the television off and picked up the guitar. Christmastime was coming and the first words out of my mouth were, 'Where did the spirit of Christmas go?' Within fifteen minutes, the entire song came out of me."

It was their first studio album since The Magnificent Moodies in 1965 to feature cover songs in addition to original material. It is also their only album to be recorded and released following the departure of Ray Thomas.

== Track listing ==
1. "Don't Need a Reindeer" (Justin Hayward) – 3:59
2. "December Snow" (Hayward) – 5:11
3. "In the Quiet of Christmas Morning (Bach 147)" (Bach, Hayward, John Lodge) – 2:51
4. "On This Christmas Day" (Lodge) – 3:40
5. "Happy Xmas (War Is Over)" (John Lennon, Yoko Ono) – 2:37
6. "A Winter's Tale" (Mike Batt, Tim Rice) – 4:28
7. "The Spirit of Christmas" (Lodge) – 4:52
8. "Yes I Believe" (Hayward) – 4:21
9. "When a Child Is Born" (Zacar, Fred Jay) – 3:34
10. "White Christmas" (Irving Berlin) – 3:08
11. "In the Bleak Midwinter" (Holst, Rossetti) – 3:21

== Personnel ==
- Justin Hayward – vocals, guitar
- John Lodge – vocals, bass guitar
- Graeme Edge – drums, percussion

Additional personnel

- Danilo Madonia – keyboards, sequencing, orchestration
- Norda Mullen – flute

== Charts ==
Chart (2003)	Peak position
US Top Holiday Albums (Billboard)	10
