= Wallace A. Ross =

American advertising executive

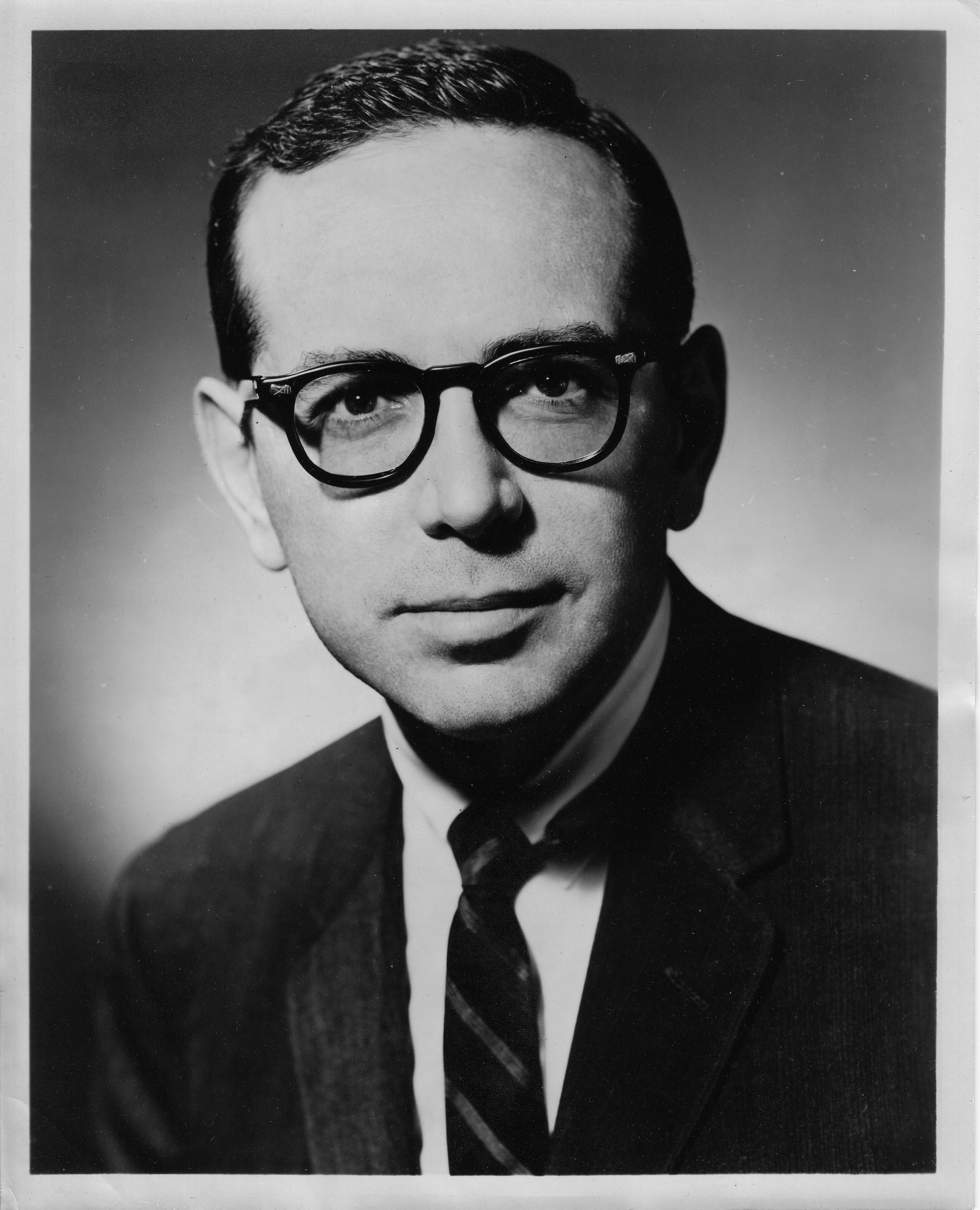
Wallace A. Ross 1959

Wallace A. Ross (1923–1974) was the founder of the Clio Awards. He was an advertising executive in New York City from the late 1940s through the early 1970s and was responsible for improving the quality, creativity, and innovation of American television and radio advertising during the "Mad Men" era.

== Education ==
Ross attended Cornell University on the G.I. Bill, and graduated in 1944, after serving in the Philippines as an infantry first lieutenant and war correspondent in WWII. At Cornell he was the co-editor of the university newspaper, The Cornell Daily Sun.

== Career ==
After college, Ross worked as a publicist for Madison Square Garden, and as the promotions manager of the Schwerin Research Corporation in New York City (quality testing of programs and commercials for leading broadcast advertisers), as well as the publicist for the International Swimming Pool Company and its president, Esther Williams. During this time he also served as the vice president of Box Office Television, Inc. the closed circuit large screen theater and hotel television production company headed by Sid Caesar.

Cover of The Ross Reports, May 1952

In 1949 Ross founded The Ross Reports, a monthly digest that compiled information on casting directors, agents, managers, production companies, and upcoming film and television productions for the NYC theater and television community. Ross was the publisher and editor of The Ross Reports until 1954.

In 1954 Ross became one of the founding members and the executive director of the Film Producers Association of New York. The FPA was an association of a number of New York City producers of documentaries, industrial films, and commercials, formed for easier negotiation with trade unions involved in the production of films. The FPA entered their films in the annual Cannes International Advertising Festival every year until 1959, when Ross founded the American Television Commercials Festival and Clio Awards.

In 1959, Ross founded the American Television Commercials Festival and the Clio Awards, and he served as the Managing Director of the Festival until 1971. Ross held a contest to choose the name for the statue, and "Clio" was the name suggested by a professor of classics. The statuette was designed by Georg Olden, VP of McCann Erickson's Center for Advanced Practice.

In 1973, Ross became the Executive Director of the International Advertising Association, a position he held until his death one year later.

== Bibliography ==
- Editor and Publisher, Clio Awards Magazine, 1960–71.
- Editor and Publisher, Best TV Commercials of the Year, 1967; Hastings House Publishers, NY. Library of Congress Catalog Card Number: 66030413.
- Editor and Publisher, Best TV and Radio Commercials of the Year, Vol. 2; 1968, Hastings House Publishers, NY.
