= Strange Times (Moody Blues album) =

Studio album by The Moody Blues
- Released: 17 August 1999
- Recorded: December 1997 – June 1999; Studio Mulinetti, Recco, Italy
- Genre: Rock
- Length: 57:33
- Label: Universal
- Producer: The Moody Blues

The Moody Blues chronology
Anthology (1998)	Strange Times (1999)	Hall of Fame (2000)

Singles from Strange Times
- 1. "English Sunset" Released: August 1999

Professional ratings
Review scores
Source	Rating
AllMusic	3/5 stars

Strange Times is the fifteenth and penultimate studio album by the rock band the Moody Blues, released in 1999. The sound features mostly acoustic guitar, slightly processed electric guitar, light organ, flute, and string arrangements, with heavy synthesizer use in the fast-paced opening track, "English Sunset". This was the last Moody Blues album to feature longtime flautist and vocalist Ray Thomas.

This album and the following year's live album Hall of Fame would be the last two Moody Blues albums to contain any reference to the Moody Blues' custom label Threshold Records in their credits.

== Track listing ==
1. "English Sunset" (Justin Hayward) — 5:05
2. "Haunted" (Hayward) — 4:31
3. "Sooner or Later (Walkin' on Air)" (Hayward, John Lodge) — 3:49
4. "Wherever You Are" (Lodge) — 3:35
5. "Foolish Love" (Hayward) — 3:56
6. "Love Don't Come Easy" (Lodge) — 4:33
7. "All That Is Real Is You" (Hayward) — 3:33
8. "Strange Times" (Hayward, Lodge) — 4:29
9. "Words You Say" (Lodge) — 5:31
10. "My Little Lovely" (Ray Thomas) — 1:45
11. "Forever Now" (Lodge) — 4:37
12. "The One" (Hayward, Lodge) — 3:39
13. "The Swallow" (Hayward) — 4:58
14. "Nothing Changes" (Graeme Edge) — 3:32

== Personnel ==
The Moody Blues

- Justin Hayward — vocals, guitar
- John Lodge — vocals, bass guitar, guitar
- Ray Thomas — vocals, flute, tambourine
- Graeme Edge — drums, percussion, vocals

Additional personnel

- Danilo Madonia — keyboards, organ, orchestration

== Charts ==
Chart (1999)	Peak position
UK Albums (OCC)	92
US Billboard 200	93
