= Paul David Wilson =

American songwriter

- Born: Paul David Wilson; 30 August 1952 (age 74); Chicago, Illinois
- Genres: Pop, R&B, Jazz, Classical
- Occupations: Songwriter, Composer, Arranger, Conductor, Producer, Executive, Flutist
- Instruments: Vocalist, Flute, Piano
- Years active: 1973-present
- Labels: Motown, Columbia, Arista, Geffen, Un-D-Nyable Entertainment

Paul David Wilson (born August 30, 1952) is an American songwriter, composer, conductor, and music producer. Most of his professional life has been devoted to music, including composing for radio and TV commercials. He became the president of a start-up record label begun by Frank Thomas, who was then the starring player on the Chicago White Sox baseball team. Wilson suffered a massive and debilitating stroke when he was 46 years old. Due to the terribly limiting effects of aphasia, a common but complicated and severe post-stroke condition, he was for a number of years unable to communicate without great difficulty. His fight back to full functioning has been a decade-long challenge that, although largely successful, in many ways still continues.

== Biography ==
=== Early life ===
Paul David Wilson was born in Chicago, Illinois. He was third son to father, Herbert, a classical tenor vocalist and choir director who taught elementary school and retired after becoming a vice-principal of the school. Wilson's mother, Odessa, was a child prodigy who grew to become a concert pianist and choir director. She was accomplished in a variety of music genres, but due to her commitment to God, only performed certain styles of music. Wilson's early lessons on piano came from his mother, and he grew up absorbing the classical and gospel music of the choirs and vocal ensembles his parents directed.

While still of pre-school age, Wilson began composing simple songs and by the time he began primary school had learned to musically notate the songs he composed. At age 12, Wilson began organizing "street corner" vocal ensembles to perform his songs at parties and selected school functions. At 13, he discovered the flute and it soon became his major instrument. Wilson attended James H. Bowen High School in Chicago. In Wilson's fourth year of high school, a friend, Arlene Johnson, persuaded him to run for class president. He was elected Senior Class President of Bowen in 1970.

He remembers the day when he was a still-young teenager and "my mother dragged me to a seminar on how to create commercial jingles." The presenters were Dick Marx, whose young son would later become a pop music star known as Richard Marx, who was then Chicago's most prominent master of music for Radio and TV commercials, and Dr. Thomas Fabish, the concert master of DePaul University’s music department. The presentation involved a big band, top-notch singers and a film. Even as he listened, Wilson was thinking, "I could do that."

Inspired by Primous Fountain III, a young composer at DePaul University, Wilson enrolled and majored in music composition and theory. He studied music composition with Dr. Leon Stein, Dr. Phil Winsor and Darlene Cowles, while taking flute with Philip Seeburg and Joseph Kainz. In 1973, he was one of 20 music students from around the U.S. selected by Ron Logan of Walt Disney Entertainment to participate in a professional "work experience." Wilson remembers it as one of the major highlights of his college career. He wrote at that time in August 1973:

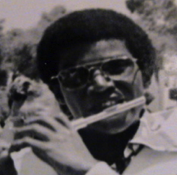
Wilson playing piccolo at Disneyland -- circa 1973.

This work experience for me came at an extremely timely point in my life as far as my musical growth is concerned. Although I had known what I actually wanted to do before starting the program, it has helped me crystallize my personal goals and ambitions, professionally and avocationally, specifically writing, arranging, and performing music in the popular and jazz idioms.

During his study at DePaul, he founded, performed in, and composed for many ensembles and often organized concerts and productions that featured works by him and others. In his senior year, Wilson was honored by inclusion in "Who's Who Among Students in American Universities & Colleges" and graduated in 1975 with a B.A. in music composition and theory.

=== Career ===
In May 1974, while a senior at DePaul, he landed part-time employment at "Star Point 7," a music production company founded by Chuck Colbert, a producer/musician with a jazz-rock band, American Breed ("Bend Me, Shape Me"). Wilson started this "job" as an unpaid go-fer, answering phones and doing basic clerical chores. After two months, Wilson was eager for a chance to show what he could contribute and saw the situation as an opportunity. "Chuck and his writing partner had parted ways and he needed someone to help finish a project. I was around and available and had the skills. I had to ask him, what are you waiting for?" Once Wilson had called attention to his talents, Colbert began using him as a composer and arranger.

A short time later, in the Summer of 1974, Wilson met a young musician who was just completing his military service, Danny Leake. At the time, Danny was a talented songwriter and electric guitar player, but would later become one of America's foremost recording studio engineers and one of Wilson's closest and most frequent collaborators.

In the Fall of 1975, Danny played a significant role in Wilson's life by introducing him to Ian Levine, a producer and songwriter, who was a celebrated member of the European black music fan base known as the Northern Soul scene. In 1975, while working with Ian, Wilson composed, arranged and produced for Dance, R&B and Northern Soul recording artists, in the course of which he traveled in the U.S. and England. One of the Levine's artists, Evelyn Thomas, scored a chart hit with her first single, reaching the UK Top 30 in 1976 with the single "Weak Spot," and "which was (co-written and) arrangement by Paul." As the writer, Neil Rushton, wrote in a review which appeared in Black Echoes, "Paul put the incredible zinging, scurrying strings in "Your Magic Put A Spell In Me" performed by [L.J Johnson Ian Levine] for Ian Levine productions and also served as the songwriter and arranger for the "1976 Disco classic, originally sung by James Wells, called "Baby I'm Still The Same Man."

Despite the success and trans-Atlantic travel he was experiencing, Wilson still lived at home with his mother and father. One day in early 1976, while diligently making "cold calls" from his parents’ basement in hopes of drumming up some fresh music opportunities, Wilson found himself talking to Jerry Butler, a fellow Chicagoan who was already well known in American soul music. Butler had (with Curtis Mayfield) been one of the original founding members of The Impressions and then established a long later career as a celebrated solo artist. That lucky phone call not only gave Wilson a chance to meet Butler, but soon led to the opportunity to work with him on a few projects, including three albums "Suite For The Single Girl", "It All Comes Out In My Song" (title song) and Thelma (Houston) & Jerry for the Motown label. Subsequently, Wilson and Butler they produce an album on Dee Dee Sharp-Gample with Philadelphia International. Billboard said, "writer/co-producer Paul Wilson's "Invitation" is a regal, touching trumph that alone would have made for worthwhile album." In 1981 with "Breaking and Entering" / "Easy Money," from Sharp-Gamble's album "Dee Dee", Wilson's production spent four weeks at number one on the Hot Dance Music/Club Play chart and Dance Chart Billboard.

=== Burrell Communications Group, LLC ===
In 1976, after two years of working with Chuck Colbert and learning business-related details, at age 24, Wilson founded Herschel Commercial, Inc ("I just named it Hershel Commercial, Inc. because it rhymed, he notes) with Maurice Earl, Arlene Johnson and, later, Bruce Montgomery. His first client was Chicago-based Burrell Communications Group, LLC, founded by Tom Burrell. Anna Morris, the creative director of Burrell, awarded him a package of many arranging spots to produce for Coca-Cola as a way to gain experience before venturing off by himself. The tracks featured Kitty Heywood, a soul singer who had already performed on a number of albums as well as commercials. Once produced, the spots were enthusiastically received, both at the ad agency and at the client. Wilson was soon creating and producing a long list of memorable and award-winning spots for Burrell and many other ad agencies, often working with such established artists as: Phyllis Hyman, Lena Horne, Anita Baker, Midnight Star, Walter Jackson, The Dells, Peabo Bryson, Ada Dyer Vickie Winans, Tramaine Hawkins, The Bar-Kays, Valerie Simpson, Joshie Jo Armstead, Millie Jackson and Rufus Thomas.

Also of note is the score Wilson composed for a television film "Happy Birthday, Martin" sung by Joshie Jo Armstead, which is on permanent display at the King Center in Atlanta.

=== Leo Burnett Worldwide ===
In 1977, a chance meeting at a barbershop brought Wilson to the attention of Don Richards, a young vice-president and account executive at Leo Burnett Worldwide, Chicago's largest and most celebrated advertising agency. Richards had been hired to facilitate Burnett's efforts to identify promising new African American staffers and suppliers, so he was ready to talk business even on a weekend trip to his barber. On hearing the young composer's story, Richards handed him a card, saying, "Call me... next week." Wilson made sure he called Richards. That meeting was most fortunate for Wilson and for Herschel. It set them on the path to success and helped establish their reputation with even the biggest and best clients, which included such major brand names as Kraft, Quaker Oats, Campbell's, United Airlines, Kellogg Company, Coca-Cola, Joseph Schlitz Brewing Company, Anheuser Busch, Busch Entertainment, Disney-ABC Domestic Television, Mars Incorporated, Alberto-Culver and Oprah Winfrey’s Harpo Productions (Oprah Winfrey). In 1980, People magazine, they featured an article on Wilson. The title was "Lookout. A Guide To The Up And Coming."

Wilson says, "To be successful, you have to be a chameleon. You're paid to do a job, not to be a conscience." Wilson wrote and composed many memorable TV and Radio music spots during the commercial phase of his career. Some of the many highlights include; "I Wanna Pop, I Wanna Shasta" for Shasta Beverages, "Sweet Talker, Betty Crocker" for Betty Crocker, "Mmm, Ahh, Ohh, Pop ‘N Fresh Dough" for Pillsbury. "Until 1981, I was known for lavish, heartwarming arrangements," says Wilson, who is a classically trained flutist with degrees in composition and orchestration. "Then I had a hit with "I Wanna Pop! I Wanna Shasta!" and suddenly I was the rock ‘n’ roll guy, the king of the synthesizers." Wilson won a CLIO award for his arranging work on the McDonald's commercial "Makin’ Music."

=== Calling Me Home, Chicago ===
"Calling Me Home, Chicago" (1985)
Paul David Wilson composed "Calling Me Home, Chicago" featuring Lee Montgomery (1985).

In 1985, Wilson scored a true "crossover hit" when a song he had created for Chicago Convention and Tourism Bureau and composed both lyrics and music featuring Lee Montgomery "Calling Me Home, Chicago," a song written for a $10 million state tourism campaign, became so instantly popular that it was released as a single and sold through area record stores. Jan Zechman of Jan Zechman Associates said, "For Chicago Tourism, our advertising agency asked six local composers to create a musical centerpiece for our campaign. We expected the competition to be fierce. It was not. One airing of Wilson's musical vision was enough to win him the job, and to help us create one of the most memorable and successful tourism campaigns in Chicago history. I believe in the power of words, but the power of Wilson's music, his notes, proved mightier than any pen on this day." That song is widely regarded even today as one of the true "classic" songs of Chicago.

Ruth L. Ratny, the owner of the magazine "Screen" and editor, she wrote, "Among the most memorable for the Illinois Department of Tourism, are the unforgettable "Calling Me Home, Chicago." State tourism director Lynda Simon says is not surprised that Wilson was able to write words and that went a long way towards popularizing the agency's first major television campaign. "He's a very talented and creative person," says Simon, "and he's a joy to work with."

=== Recording and live performance ===
In 1987, because of his desire to re-enter the record business, Wilson (with attorney Linda Mensch) discovered and produced a new artist, "Nikki." Eventually signed to Geffen Records, the debut album entitled "Nikki" was released in the summer of 1989. One song, "Notice Me" was a hit, reaching #21 on the U.S. Billboard Hot 100 and #11 on Billboard's Adult Contemporary chart, bringing Wilson honors from BMI as writer and publisher of one of the most performed songs of the year.

In early 1989, Wilson was called on by noted choral conductor Nathan Carter to orchestrate Robert Ray's "Gospel Mass" for a joint performance of the Morgan State University Choir and the Detroit Symphony. Also in 1989, Wilson was appointed conductor/artistic director for a concert series entitled "Classic Black" (Executive Produced by Valarie Norman). The first concert was given at Chicago's Orchestra Hall in April 1990.

Wilson wrote:

I’m happy where I’m at, " he says, "but I’m not so happy that I don’t want to go forward. I’m still reaching for other goals. I don’t know, maybe I’ll never be satisfied so long as I know there are new musical mountains to climb.

==== Un-D-Nyable Entertainment, Inc. ====
In 1997, Wilson accepted an offer from Frank Thomas, "The Big Hurt" the star player and home run hitter of the Chicago White Sox, to serve as President of Un-D-Nyable Entertainment, an independent record label. Wilson agreed to run the label in partnership with Thomas.

My executive responsibility is to manage the day-to-to operations, hire creative talent, set up business relations with manufacturers and distributors and, above all, to find new and exceptional talent. (Screen, Vol. 19, No. 6, February 10, 1997)

Their initial release was a CD single entitled "3-5, The White Sox Got’em Open Up Wide," with Frank Thomas featuring D. Stoy. Wilson discovered and signed Dejah Gomez, a precociously talented 14-year-old singer and songwriter, and hired Cleo Powell as the label's A&R Director.

In 1998, Wilson hired Jun Mhoon, accomplished both as a musician and an executive at A&M Records, as Executive V.P. General Manager and Maurice White, formerly with Columbia Records, as Promotion Director and Jon Smith, Studio Manager. He also signed Entourage (James "Slique" Adams, Floyd Massey, Eric Wade and Irone Guyton, a R&B singing group), rapper Ant-Dub and STRONG, an R&B group that was a family of five brothers. He then secured the services of songwriters/producers, Jack & Earl and George Claiborne. He soon formed an alliance with the music distributors, Navarro.

In late 1998, Wilson produced the debut CD for Dejah Gomez ("Dejah") and Entourage ("The Fall Backs of a Playa") and matching videos for the CD songs and a CD single title "I Can't Hide" featuring STRONG. In December, a single "When," by Entourage, they charted on Billboard. Soon, both Dejah Gomez and Entourage were starting to "take off," but, in January 1999, just as the action and excitement was building for his young record company, Wilson suffered a stroke.

== Health ==
On January 2, 1999, the stroke left the active and energetic 46-year-old composer, producer and businessman suddenly and seriously disabled (CT). The doctors revealed that an ischemic CVA of left MCA with hemorrhagic transformation. Wilson was told he had to accept lasting and severe restrictions on his ability to verbally communicate, due to the post-stroke condition known as Aphasia.

Aphasia is the inability to speak, read, write or understand speech. Wilson was hospitalized at West Suburban Hospital Medical Center in Oak Park and Northwestern Memorial Hospital in Chicago. Subsequently, he went through rehabilitation at the Rehabilitation Institute of Chicago and Willowbrook.

Wilson wrote:

In Oak Park Hospital and Northwestern Hospital I stayed for a month or so. Then, six months in the rehabilitation center to learn just the basic things like saying my name again, signing my signature, spelling my name, my address, brushing my teeth, all the little things that I had to learn to do all over again.

In need of a restful setting for his recuperation, Wilson and his wife, Terry, relocated to Maui in Hawaii where they lived for five years. Wilson eventually found and studied with Dr. Walter Tokishi, a speech therapist, but the scarcity of expert medical support to help him overcome the limitations imposed by his aphasia was still a drawback of living on Maui. In 2005, he returned to Chicago, where he began an intensive rehabilitation regimen, fiercely determined to resume his musical career.

== Personal life ==
Wilson has six brothers. They are: James Warren (classical/gospel organ, piano), Herbert Liston (Acoustic/electric bass), John Oland (vocalist), Mark Andrew, Steward Franklin (B-3, piano). One brother, Mark, died when he was an infant due to heart complication.

Wilson has been married and divorced two times and has one stepchild:

- to married Marilyn Baynes from 1978 to 1982;
- to married Terry Moore from 1982 to 2005 with one stepdaughter, Carmen and one grandson.

== Professional Activities & Affiliations ==
He has been a Chicago Chapter Governor and National Trustee of The Recording Academy (NARAS) and active on its Education, Finance, Restructuring and Long Range Planning Committee. In the mid-1990s, he was Chicago Chapter President of The Recording Academy and later served as a trustee of the Winans Academy of Performing Arts.

== Awards ==
- Grammy "All Out" The Winans
- Clio US Television/Cinema – Best New Arrangements Of Commercial Themes – McDonald's – "Makin’ Music"
- Clio 10 Awards
- BMI Awards "Notice Me" - As writer and publisher of one of the most performed songs of the year.
- CEBA "Family Is" - McDonald's
- CEBA 8 Awards

== Media ==
Wilson performed with the band "The Nightclub Band" on the film, A Family Thing (Robert Duvall, James Earl Jones) which also featured the song "Family Thing Blues" on the soundtrack. A film, "Signs," was used with Wilson's music jingle, "I Wanna Pop, I Wanna Shasta." His song titled, "Invitation" perform by Ada Dyer, was "sample" and then used another song entitled "Brown Sugar (fine)", with the film Brown Sugar, which performed by Mos Def and produced by Kanye West. (The film's credits of "Brown Sugar (fine)" was incorrect)

== Discography ==
- 2002: Co-writer. Brown Sugar, "Brown Sugar(fine)," Mos Def. MCA.
- 1998: Writer, Arranger, Producer, Executive Producer. Dejah, Dejah. Un-D-Nyable Entertainment
- 1998: Executive Producer. The Fall Backs of a Playa, Entourage. Un-D-Nyable Entertainment
- 1993: Arranger. "Been Good" All Out, The Winans, Qwest Records, R. Kelly, Producer. Grammy Award Winning Album
- 1989: Co-writer, Arranger, Producer. Nikki, debut album, Geffen. Pop Top Twenty and BMI Award for "Notice Me."
- 1995: Writer, Arranger, Producer. "Calling Me Home, Chicago." Herschel Records.
- 1981: Writer, Arranger, Producer. Dee Dee, Dee Dee Sharp Gamble, Philadelphia International Records.
- 1979: Writer, Arranger, Producer. "Invitation," (title song), "Together," Norman Connors, Arista Records.
- 1976: Writer, Arranger, Producer. "It All Comes Out in My Songs" (title song) and "I Still Remember How It Used to Feel," Jerry Butler, Motown Records.
- 1976: Writer, Arranger, Producer. "Music In My Dreams," "Dreams Music," "Ms. Fine" and "Chalk It Up," Suite for the Single Girl, Jerry Butler. Motown Records.
- 1976: Writer, Arranger. "Baby I'm Still The Same Man, James Wells. Polydor.
- 1975: Co-writer, Arranger. "Weak Spot," Evelyn Thomas, Twentieth Century Records. Top Ten Record in England.
- 1975: Arranger. "Your Magic Put A Spell On Me," L.J. Johnson, Philips Records.
- 1975: Arranger. "24 Hours A Day, " Barbara Pennington." Casablanca Records

== Demography ==
Year	Commercial
1976	Herschel Commercial, Inc.#1. S.C. Johnson & Son, Scotch Brand, Aamco, Schlitz Malt Liquor featuring Maxine Weldon, Kraft Foods "Parkay", Gallery Homes, Turnstyle, DW Sugar, Con Edison, Coca-Cola featuring Kitty Heywood
1977	Herschel Commercial, Inc.#2. Danger Zone, Sears, McDonald's, Scotch Brand, Ultra Sheen, S.C. Johnson, Schlitz Malt Liquor, Car-X Muffler Shop, Gallery Homes, McDonald's, Coca-Cola
1978	Herschel Commercial, Inc.#3. Schlitz, Aamco, Harley-Davidson, McDonald's, Coca-Cola, Johnson Products, McDonald's, Sunkist, Coca-Cola, Ultra Sheen
1979	Herschel Commercial, Inc.#4. RCA, Busch, Rice Krispies, McDonald's, Afro Sheen, Poppin" Fresh, Xxxxxx, Phillip Morris, Kelloggs, Coca-Cola
1980	Herschel Commercial, Inc.#5a. RCA Color, Kelloggs, Dubonet featuring Morgana King, Kent, RCA - Two for the Money, RCA, Afro Soft, NBC, Sara Lee, Oldsmobile, Sears
1980	Herschel Commercial, Inc.#5b. Ultra Sheen, McDonald's featuring Peobo Bryson, Nehi
1981	Herschel Commercial, Inc.#6. RCA, Kent, McDonald's, Busch, Church's Fried Chicken, McDonald's featuring Tramaine Hawkins, Pillsbury, Sears, McDonald's, HCI
1982	Herschel Commercial, Inc.#7. Upper Ten, RCA, Metamacil, Shasta "I Wanna Pop, I Wanna Shasta" featuring Kym Sims, American Bell, Illinois Bell, New Freedom, Shasta, RC 100, Stat Sof Fro, Coldwell Banker, RC Cola
1983	Herschel Commercial, Inc.#8. Shasta "I Wanna Pop, I Wanna Shasta" featuring Al Jourenson, RC 100, Pert, Metamucil, Shasta, Coldwell Banker, New Freedom, Atari featuring Al Jourenson, Pillsbury "Mmm, Ahh, Ohh, Pop ‘N Fresh Dough", Stay Sof Fro, Upper Ten
1984	Herschel Commercial, Inc.#9. Memorex, Betty Crocker, Ford, Spree featuring Valerie Simpson, Handi Snacks, Shasta, Allen Bradley, Pillsbury, Ore-Ida, Mirida, McDonald's
1986	Herschel Commercial, Inc.#10. Illinois Bureau Tourism featuring Lee Montgomery, Sunkist Natural, Schlitz Red Bull, Michelob Light, Household Finance Co., Betty Crocker, "One Man" featuring Joshie Jo Armstead, Mrs. Smith's Pie, Cap’n Crunch, Coke, Ore-Ida, White Cloud, Schlitz Liquor, Pillsbury Poppin’ Fresh Dough, American Banking, AM South, McDonald's
1987	Herschel Commercial, Inc.#11a. Busch Gardens, Illinois Bureau Tourism, Spam, Mars Candy, East Ohio Gas, Schlitz Malt Liquor, Kraft Salad Dressing, Pillsbury Pastry Pockets
1987	Herschel Commercial, Inc.#11b. Kelloggs Cocoa Crispies, Milton Bradley, Trans Ohio Bank, McDonald's
1988	Herschel Commercial, Inc.#12. Busch Gardens, Adventure Island, Combo's, Ford, Illinois Lottery, HARPO, Inc. "Brewster Place", Union Electric, Cherry Berry Wine, Midway Airlines, Budweiser "Lou Rawls’ Parade", Pillsbury, Crest featuring Lena Horne, Pillsbury "Mmm, Ahh, Ohh, Pop ‘N Fresh Dough", Zayre, McDonald's
1989	Herschel Commercial, Inc.#13. Michelob Dry, Nestle Corporation, Coast Soap, Tide, Campbell's Teddy-O's, Fisher Price, United Airlines, Soft Sheen, Illinois Bell featuring Angie Bofill, Noxzema, Fisher Price, Clean Streak
1990	Herschel Commercial, Inc.#14. Miller Lite, Frito Lite Lay Suprimo's, Coca-Cola featuring Anita Baker, Quaker Oat Cereal "Tiny Toons", Kellogg's Rice Krispies, Polaroid, Coast Soap, Schlitz Malt Liquor, Ralston Purina, Pizza Hut, McDonald's, Budweiser "Harry Caray, Schlitz Malt Liquor
1994	Herschel Commercial, Inc.#15. Löwenbräu, InsuranceOne, Steel Drums, FTD, River Casinos, Procter & Gamble, McDonald's, Coors Extra Gold, Busch Gardens.
