= Piero Pintucci =

Italian composer, arranger, conductor and pianist (born 1943)

- Born: January 8, 1942 (age 84); Fiesole, Italy
- Occupations: Composer, arranger, conductor, pianist

Piero Pintucci (born 8 January 1943) is an Italian composer, arranger, conductor, and pianist.

== Life and career ==
Born in Fiesole, the son of two musicians, Pintucci studied piano at the Conservatorio Luigi Cherubini in Florence. Put under contract as an arranger by RCA, he got his first success arranging Gianni Morandi's single "C'era un ragazzo che come me amava i Beatles e i Rolling Stones". Starting from the late 1960s,, he was also active as a composer, collaborating among others with Mia Martini, Gabriella Ferri, Patty Pravo and Nicola Di Bari, for whom he composed the Sanremo Music Festival 1972 winning song "I giorni dell'arcobaleno".

In the mid-1970s, Pintucci started a long collaboration as producer, composer and arranger with Renato Zero, signing the music of his signature song "Il carrozzone". He often collaborated with RAI and Mediaset as a composer of scores and conductor of TV shows, such as Raffaella Carrà's Carramba. He also composed the music of the stage musicals Fratelli and Gaetanaccio, both starring Gigi Proietti.
