= Cercami =

Single by Renato Zero

from the album Amore dopo amore
- B-side: "Appena in tempo"
- Released: 1998
- Length: 5:44
- Label: Fonòpoli; Sony Music
- Songwriters: Gianluca Podio; Renato Zero
- Producer: Phil Palmer

Renato Zero singles chronology
"L'impossibile vivere" (1998)	"Cercami" (1998)	"Dimmi chi dorme accanto a me" (1998)

Audio
- "Cercami" on YouTube

"Cercami" ('Look for me') is a 1998 Italian song composed by Gianluca Podio and Renato Zero and performed by Renato Zero. It is the second single released from the album Amore dopo amore.

== Overview ==
A semi-autobiographical song, it has been described as "a declaration of love to his audience, almost a plea from a man-artist who lays himself bare, opens his heart and asks to be loved as he is, with his flaws, his doubts, seeking him beyond the compromises of life".

Artists who covered the song include Mina and Fiorella Mannoia.

== Track listing ==
No.	Title	Writer(s)	Length
1.	"Cercami"	Renato Zero, Gianluca Podio	5:44
2.	"Appena in tempo"	Zero, Danilo Riccardi	6:20

== Charts ==
Chart (1998)	Peak position
Italy (FIMI)	3

== Certifications ==
Region	Certification	Certified units/sales
Italy (FIMI) Sales since 2009	Platinum	100,000^{‡}
^{‡} Sales+streaming figures based on certification alone.
