= Hall of Fame (The Moody Blues album) =

Live album by the Moody Blues
- Released: 8 August 2000
- Recorded: 1 May 2000 at the Royal Albert Hall; London, England
- Genres: Rock, progressive rock
- Length: 73:36
- Label: Ark 21

The Moody Blues chronology
Strange Times (1999)	Hall of Fame (2000)	December (2003)

Hall of Fame is a live album by the progressive rock band the Moody Blues. It was recorded at a concert performed at the Royal Albert Hall, which included backing by a live orchestra. The album was released on 8 August 2000. It is the second Moody Blues live album to feature a live orchestra, with the first being A Night at Red Rocks with the Colorado Symphony Orchestra. This is the last live release to feature Ray Thomas.

The concert is also available on DVD.

== Track listing ==
All songs by Justin Hayward, except where noted.

1. "Overture" (Ray Thomas, Hayward) – 3:58 (features excerpts from "Legend of a Mind", "Tuesday Afternoon", and "Nights in White Satin")
2. "Tuesday Afternoon" – 4:30
3. "English Sunset" – 5:16
4. "Words You Say" (John Lodge) – 5:13
5. "The Story in Your Eyes" – 3:47
6. "I Know You're Out There Somewhere" – 5:25
7. "Haunted" – 4:14
8. "Your Wildest Dreams" – 4:54
9. "Isn't Life Strange" (Lodge) – 5:50
10. "I'm Just a Singer (In a Rock and Roll Band)" (Lodge) – 6:26
11. "Nights in White Satin" – 6:59
12. "Legend of a Mind" (Ray Thomas) – 6:01
13. "Question" – 6:14
14. "Ride My See-Saw" (Lodge) – 5:07

== Personnel ==
- Justin Hayward – guitars, vocals
- John Lodge – bass guitar, vocals
- Ray Thomas – flutes, percussion, vocals
- Graeme Edge – drums, percussion

=== Additional personnel ===
- Paul Bliss – keyboards
- Bias Boshell – keyboards
- Gordon Marshall – drums
- Tracy Graham – backing vocals
- Sue Shattock – backing vocals
- The World Festival Orchestra

== Charts ==
Chart (2000)	Peak position
US Billboard 200	185

== Certifications ==
Region	Certification	Certified units/sales
Australia (ARIA)	Platinum	15,000^{^}
^{^} Shipments figures based on certification alone.
