= Franca Evangelisti =

Italian composer and lyricist (born 1975)

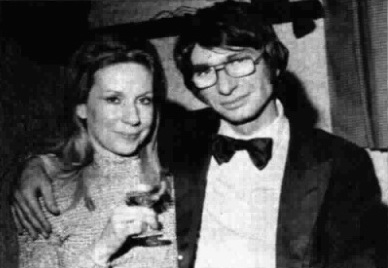
- Evangelisti with Nicola Di Bari in Radiocorriere magazine (1972)
- Born: 6 April 1935 (age 89); Rome, Italy
- Occupation(s): Lyricist; Composer

Franca Evangelisti (born 6 April 1935) is an Italian lyricist and singer.

== Life and career ==
Born in Rome, Evangelisti studied singing with composer Lino Benedetto. In the second half of the 1950s, she started her professional career as a singer with the stage name Evy Angeli. She was a vocalist in various orchestras, touring extensively, and also performing several times on American television.

In the late 1960s, Evangelisti was put under contract by RCA Italiana as a lyricist, notably becoming a close collaborator of Renato Zero for about twenty years, signing some of his most known songs such as "Il carrozzone", "Amico", "Madame", "Sesso o esse". In this role, Evangelisti took part in four editions of the Sanremo Music Festival, in particular writing the lyrics of Patty Pravo's 1987 entry "Pigramente signora". Artists with whom she collaborated also include Domenico Modugno, Mina, Sylvie Vartan, Mia Martini, Nicola Di Bari, Riccardo Fogli, Michele Zarrillo, Dario Baldan Bembo and Adriano Pappalardo.
