= Alberto Parodi =

Chilean businessman

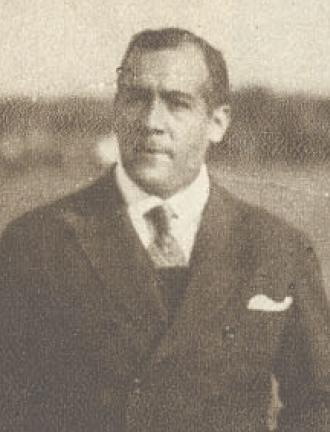
Alberto Parodi

Alberto Parodi was a Chilean businessman, best known as the first president of the football club Colo-Colo from 1925 to 1926.
