= Carnera =

Carnera is an Italian surname literally meaning butcher. Notable people with the surname include:

- Luigi Carnera (1875–1962), Italian astronomer
- Primo Carnera (1906–1967), Italian boxer
- Raimondo Carnera (1915–2002), Danish fencer
- Carnera (footballer) (1908–1986), Brazilian footballer
- Paolo Carnera (born 1957), Italian film cinematographer
