= Ruth L. Ratny =

American journalist

Ruth Lucille Ratny (December 8, 1927 in Chicago, Illinois – February 21, 2017), born Ruth Louise Ratny, worked in the Chicago film industry her entire career. As the publisher/editor of ReelChicago.com, an online industry trade publication, she chronicled the Chicago visual media industry for 30 years. She was also a screenwriter of a music biopic about the life and times of Mahalia Jackson, The Queen of Soul, and about what a Mexican woman went through to illegally cross the border.

== Career ==
Prior to ReelChicago, Ratny worked in advertising. Then, in 1979, she founded Screen Magazine, which she published and edited. Screen went beyond a weekly publication, and produced several national trade shows, a score of seminars and the first annual industry networking event.

Health issues compelled Ratny to relinquish her print publication in 2002, but she returned to chronicling the film industry through her ReelChicago.com website in 2004.

In addition to Clios, Emmys, Tells, and Cine Lions, Ratny's honors include induction into Today's Chicago Woman's Hall of Fame; Chicago Advertising Woman of the Year, and Midwest Advertising Woman of the Year Awards, and Women in Film's Recognition Award.

Ratny received recognition awards from Lawyers for the Creative Arts and the Chicago Coalition, of which she was a founding member.

== Education ==
Ratny studied marketing at DePaul University, and continued her education at Loyola University. She was active in many local film organizations, and earlier taught courses at Columbia College Chicago. She also taught selling and marketing for creative services through Screen seminars.

== Death ==
Ratny died of heart failure at age 89 on February 21, 2017.
