= Gabriella Ferri =

Italian singer

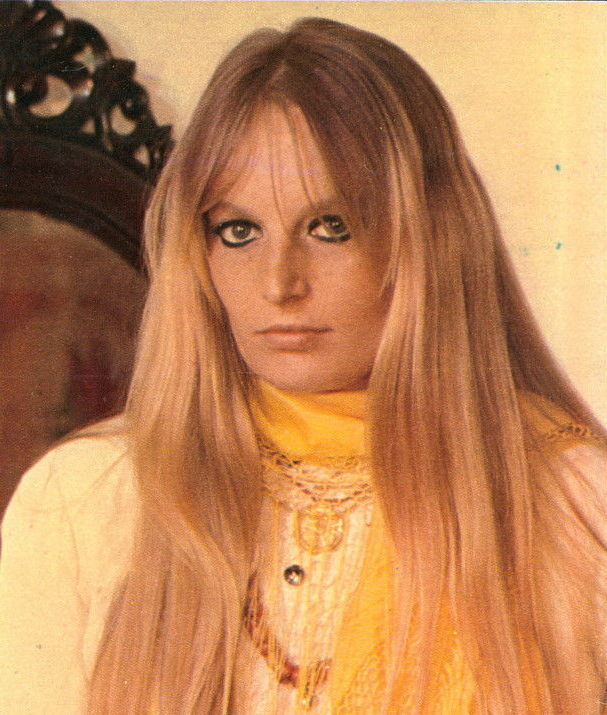
- Ferri in 1975

Background information
- Born: Maria Gabriella Ferri; 18 September 1942; Rome, Kingdom of Italy
- Died: 3 April 2004 (aged 61) Corchiano, Italy
- Occupation: Singer
- Years active: 1963–1990s

Maria Gabriella Ferri (18 September 1942 – 3 April 2004) was an Italian singer from Rome.

== Early life ==
Ferri was born in the Testaccio district of Rome, in Piazza Santa Maria Liberatrice. Her father, Vittorio, was a peddler of sweets, tourniquets and razor blades and her first fan, with whom she used to sing ditties with him. She was a dropout after Class 4 due to an accident. She worked in a shop where she met Luisa De Santis, the daughter of music director Giuseppe, and that changed her life.

== Career ==
Ferri's career began in a Milan nightclub in 1963. By 1965, she had broken into the Rome singing scene by singing popular Roman songs, thereby becoming an icon of Romanesco singing. One of her biggest hits was "Sempre" ("Always"). During her career, she also performed Neapolitan and Latin American pieces. During the 1970s, she starred in several popular TV shows. By the 1990s, however, she had largely left the spotlight.

=== Death ===
She died in Corchiano, province of Viterbo, after falling from a third-floor balcony in an apparent suicide. Family members dispute this, saying she may have fallen ill after taking anti-depression medication and lost her balance.
