= Renato Zero =

Italian musician (born 1950)

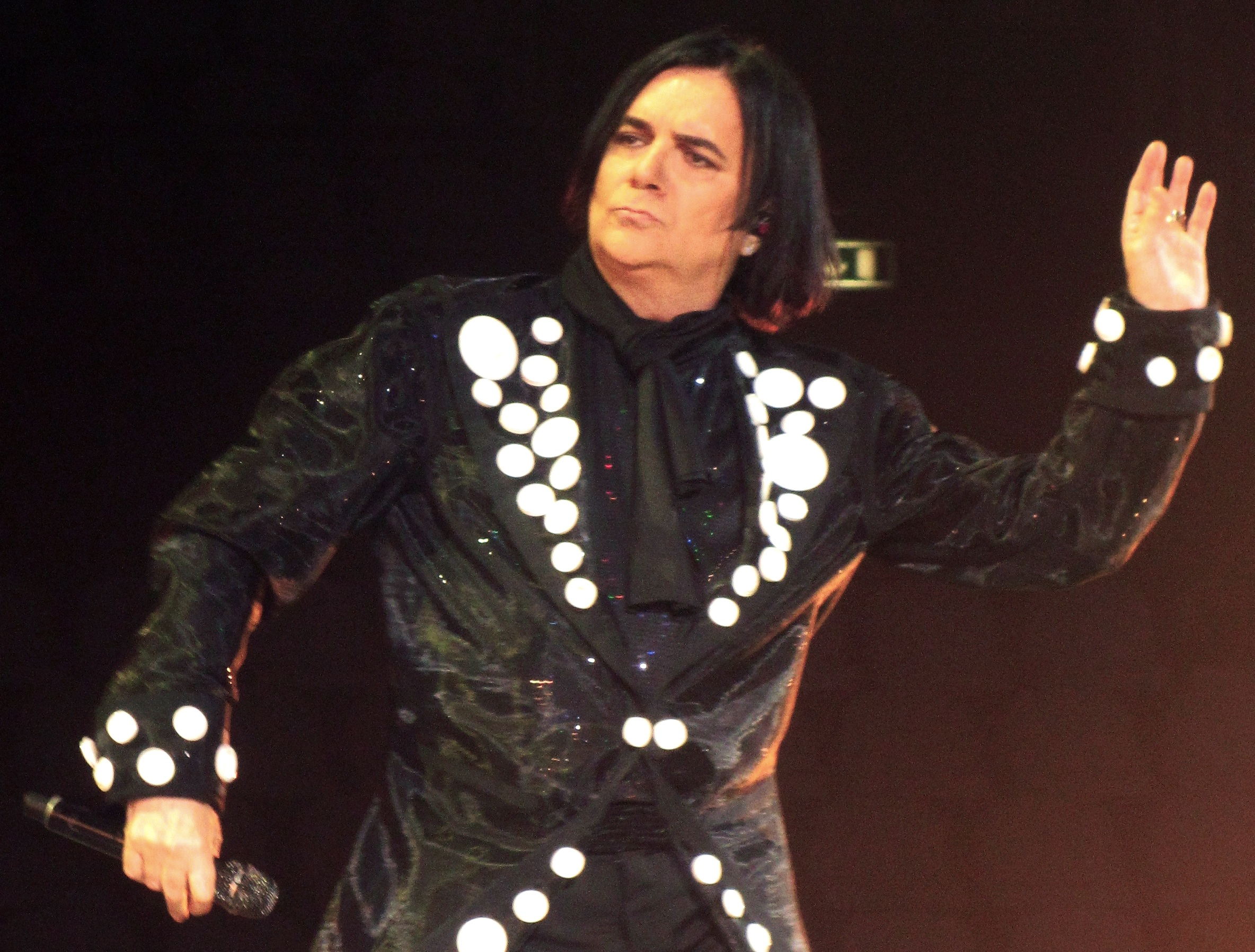
- Renato Zero in concert in 2013

Background information
- Born: Renato Fiacchini; 30 September 1950 (age 76); Rome, Italy
- Genres: Pop rock; soul; rock and roll; glam rock
- Occupations: Singer; songwriter; record producer; dancer; actor; philanthropist
- Years active: 1965–present
- Labels: Zerolandia; Sony Music; Tattica
- Website: renatozero.com

Renato Fiacchini (born 30 September 1950), known by the stage name Renato Zero (Italian pronunciation: [reˈnaːto dˈdzɛːro]), is an Italian singer-songwriter, producer, dancer and actor whose career spans from the 1960s to the 2020s.

Zero is the only artist to have reached the top of the Italian charts in six different decades. With 60 million records sold, he is one of the best-selling Italian music artists.

== Life and Career ==
=== Early life ===
Zero was born Renato Fiacchini in central Rome, in Via di Ripetta, next to the famed Via del Corso.

Zero quit his studies early to devote himself to his true passion, the arts, more specifically playing music and singing – though initially with little success. From an early age, he would wear make-up and cross-dress. He replied to the criticisms he received (including the recurring insult Sei uno zero! – "You're a zero!") by taking on the pseudonym Renato Zero. He recorded his first songs in 1965: "Tu", "Sì", "Il deserto", "La solitudine", which were never issued. His first published single, "Non basta sai/In mezzo ai guai" (1967), sold a total of 20 copies and was quickly forgotten.

He had several different jobs, including an appearance in an advertisement for ice-cream; work as a dancer in a TV show; playing and dancing in two musicals; and minor roles in two Fellini movies. He became friend to sisters Mia Martini and Loredana Bertè.

In the early 1970s Zero's career was given a boost by the glam-rock movement, from which he benefited with his sexual ambiguity and androgynous appearance. At the same time, this led him to being accused of emulating other celebrities like David Bowie and, in particular, Marc Bolan. In 1973 he issued his first LP, No! Mamma, no! (recorded live), but still with little success. The follow-up Invenzioni met the same fate.

=== Birth of "Zeromania" ===
It was not until 1976 that he scored his first hit with the single "Madame", a collaboration with songwriter Franca Evangelisti and composer Piero Pintucci, with whom Zero continued to work in the years that followed. "Madame" and the album including it, Trapezio, established a regular and loyal audience for Zero. This was to increase exponentially in the following years, until he could boast a huge following of die-hard fans that he dubbed Sorcini ("Little Mice"). Among his greatest hits at the time, all of them topping and breaking the Italian charts for quite some time, "Mi vendo", "Morire qui", "Triangolo", "Baratto" are still popular in Italy, and were among all disco clubs’ playlists.

The late 1970s and early 1980s were years of great success for Zero's character, with the LPs Zerofobia ("Zerophobia", 1977), Zerolandia (1978), Erozero (1979), Tregua (1980), Artide Antartide (1981), Via Tagliamento (1982) and Calore (1983) topping the Italian charts. At this time Renato Zero was amongst the two or three most popular singers in Italy and his songs "Il Cielo", "Il carrozzone", "Amico", "Più su" and "Spiagge" were already regarded, by fans and critics, as some of the best Italian songs ever.

The name Zerolandia also referred to the moving theatre (a circus tent with a capacity of 5,000) in which he performed shows throughout Italy. On numerous occasions fans would participate in the gigs, made-up like Zero and dressed in his typical costumes.

In 1979 Zero played himself in the movie Ciao Nì (his usual greeting to his fans, which is a term of endearment that can be roughly translated as "Hi, Dear!"). In Italy this film grossed more than the American blockbuster Superman.

In 1980 he founded his own record label called Zeromania Music.

=== The '80s: career dip ===
In the 1980s he began to abandon make-up and greasepaint, but this did not rid Zero of his mania for grandeur: in the 1980 tour, for example, he entered the stage riding a white horse. In 1982 he began a collaboration with the opera director Renato Serio, who was to write the string arrangements for almost all of Zero's following LPs. In late 1982 he took part in RAI's Fantastico 3, then the most popular Italian TV show.

His career continued to be successful until 1984. That year, however, his new album Leoni si nasce, that he presented in a press conference disguised as a lion and was escorted by four aborigines, was a commercial failure, even though it peaked at No. 1. His 1987 album Zero marked the lowest point of his career, peaking at No. 13 but then almost immediately disappearing from the Italian charts.

=== 1990s: the comeback ===
In 1991 Renato Zero participated in the Sanremo Music Festival with the song "Spalle al muro", and from that moment on his career began to rise again. In 1993 he ranked No. 1 on the Italian charts with the LP Quando non-sei più nessuno. The following year L'imperfetto repeated this success. His concerts would regularly sell out, and he returned to his famous dress changes, although in a more balanced style.

In the mid-1990s Zero dubbed the character of Jack Skellington and sang the songs in the Italian release of Tim Burton's motion picture The Nightmare Before Christmas.

In 1999, he sang his hit song "Il Cielo" at Pavarotti and Friends together with tenor Luciano Pavarotti, and later the same year, Italian diva Mina paid him a tribute with her album Mina n° 0, containing ten of Zero's songs, including one sung in duet with him.

=== From the 2000s to the 2020s ===
In 2004 his tour "Cattura il sogno/Il sogno continua" ("Catch the dream/The dream continues") was awarded by Pollstar magazine as the most successful of the year in Italy as well as one of the most successful worldwide (#30). The recording of his concerts in Rome, held at Olimpico Stadium in June, was the top selling musical DVD in 2004.

In 2005 he took part in the Italian staging of Live 8, in the Circo Massimo. In November his new album Il dono ("The Gift") topped the charts and maintained the No. 1 position until the end of the year. In December 2005 he performed in the Vatican with a song dedicated to Pope John Paul II. He also advocated for safe sex with condoms. Renato Zero's 2006 tour was entitled "Zeromovimento" and involved 25 concerts. After 40 years of his musical career, in February 2006 he refused the Career Award at the Sanremo Festival, stating that the award should be for artists who had reached old age.

In 2007 he toured again in major Italian cities, filling sports stadiums. The tour was called "MpZerO", and attracted 270,000 spectators over seven dates, of which 120,000 filled the Olympic Stadium of Rome, his hometown.

Presente, his 30th album, was released in Europe and the Americas on 20 March 2009. It went multi-platinum in Italy, with 80,000 copies sold in the first week. It sold over 350,000 copies. Following the release of Presente, Renato toured again in autumn 2009; the "Zeronove tour" saw 30 sold-out dates and was the most successful gig of the year in Italy. On 10 December the music video for "Ancora qui", the first single from the album Presente, won the best Italian video of the year. In September 2010 Presente (CD edition + special CD+DVD edition) was certified by FIMI as the top selling album in Italy during the years 2009–2010. In 2012 Sei Zero was certified as the top selling DVD of 2011.

In 2013 he released two new albums, Amo – capitolo I and Amo – capitolo II; both peaked at No. 1 on the Italian charts. During 2013–2014 he toured again, after a three-year hiatus; his new show, "Amo in tour", saw all 59 concerts sold out, with a record tenure in Rome (twenty dates), Milan (eight dates) and Florence (eight dates).

On 13 February 2016, he was guest of honor at the Sanremo Music Festival. On that occasion he announced his next album, Alt, to be released on 8 April that year. On 2 March "Chiedi", the first single from Alt, peaked at No. 1 on the iTunes chart. The album later debuted at No. 1 on the official FIMI Italian albums chart.

On 6 November 2020 "Zerosettanta vol. 2" peaked at No. 1 on the Italian album charts, making Renato Zero the only artist in history to have reached the top of the charts in six different decades.

== Reception ==
Renato Zero is the only artist to have reached number 1 on the Italian charts in six different decades (1970s, ‘80s, ‘90s, 2000s, 2010s and 2020s). He has had no fewer than 30 albums in the Top 10.

Renato Zero has an album (Presente) certified Diamond by FIMI, a goal officially achieved in the Italian charts history by only five artists (Vasco Rossi, Ligabue, Jovanotti and Modà being the others).

He likes to work with other artists, and has written songs for numerous other singers as well. With his particular approach in performances, shows and tours, he is a leading live performer in his country and obtained a unique spot in the Italian musical scene.

== Personal life and views ==
Though the general consensus was that he is bisexual or gay, but conservative in not wanting to reveal his sexuality, Zero self-identified as heterosexual during an Italian talk show. Zero has admitted to having two relationships; one with Enrica Bonaccorti, a famous television host, and another with Lucy Morante, his former secretary.

His image has changed through the decades, from the flamboyant, makeup-wearing transvestite of the mid-1970s, reminiscent of Marc Bolan or The Rocky Horror Picture Show’s Dr. Frank'N'Furter, to today's somber, blue-suit-clad icon of no specific gender and unspecified age, his only affectation a head of jet-black hair and a thin veil of foundation and lip gloss.

Throughout his career, Renato Zero has advocated against drug abuse. His ‘grand force’ is regarded to be having shown "the normality of the diverse", convincing the public that diversity feeds our human abilities to feel and act with love, respect, solidarity and faith.

== Discography and videography ==
Album	Year	Peak	Weeks	Label	Sales	Certifications
No! Mamma, No!	1973	–	–	RCA		
Invenzioni	1974	–	–	RCA	–	
Trapezio	1976	32	11	RCA		
Zerofobia	1977	16	57	RCA	ITA: 400,000	
Zerolandia	1978	3	35	Zerolandia/RCA	ITA: 900,000	
EroZero	1979	1	25	Zerolandia/RCA		
Tregua	1980	1	26	Zerolandia/BMG	ITA: 1,200,000	
Icaro (live)	1981	1	35	Zerolandia/BMG		
Artide Antartide	1981	1	24	Zerolandia/BMG	ITA: 1,300,000	
Via Tagliamento 1965/1970	1982	1	21	Zerolandia/BMG	ITA: 600,000	
Calore EP	1983	1	20	Zerolandia/BMG		
Leoni si nasce	1984	1	16	Zerolandia/BMG		
Identikit (anthology)	1984	14	7	Zerolandia/BMG		
Soggetti smarriti	1986	2	22	Zerolandia/BMG	ITA: 100,000	
Zero	1987	13	17	Zerolandia/BMG		
Voyeur	1989	5	21	Zerolandia/BMG		
Prometeo (live)	1991	3	20	Zerolandia/BMG		
La coscienza di Zero	1991	5	8	RCA		
Quando non-sei più di nessuno	1993	1	23	Zerolandia/BMG		
Passaporto per Fonopoli EP	1993	1	13	Zerolandia/BMG	–	
L'imperfetto	1994	1	23	Fonopoli/Sony	ITA: 200,000	
Sulle tracce dell'imperfetto	1995	2	21	Fonopoli/Sony		
Amore dopo amore	1998	2	51	Fonopoli/Sony	ITA: 1,200,000	
Amore dopo amore Tour dopo tour (live)	1999	1	34	Fonopoli/Sony		
I Miei Numeri	2000	12				
Tutti gli Zeri del Mondo	2000	3	19	Fonopoli/Sony		
La Curva dell'Angelo	2001	1	40	Tattica/Sony	ITA: 400,000	
Cattura	2003	1	53	Tattica/Sony	ITA: 500,000	
Figli del Sogno (live)	2004	2	39	Tattica/Sony		
Figli del Sogno DVD	2004	1	60	Tattica/Sony		
Il Dono	2005	1	35	Tattica/Sony		
Renatissimo! (anthology)	2006	3	34	Tattica/Sony	ITA: 300,000	
Zero40 DVD	2008	1	28	Universal		
Presente	2009	1	89	Tattica	ITA: 350,000	
Segreto Amore	2010			Tattica/IndipendenteMente		FIMI: Platinum
"Zeronove" tour DVD	2010	1	13	Tattica		FIMI: Diamond
Puro Spirito	2011			Tattica/IndipendenteMente		FIMI: Platinum
Sei Zero DVD	2011	1	20	Tattica		
Amo - Capitolo I	2013	1	28	Tattica/IndipendenteMente		FIMI: Platinum
Amo - Capitolo II	2013	1	16	Tattica/IndipendenteMente		FIMI: Platinum
Alt	2016	1		Tattica/IndipendenteMente		FIMI: Platinum
Arenà (live CD/DVD)	2016	9		Tattica/IndipendenteMente		FIMI: Gold
Zerovskij	2017	1		Tattica/IndipendenteMente		FIMI: Gold
Zerovskij – Live	2018	3		Tattica/IndipendenteMente		
Alt in Tour	2018	6		Tattica/IndipendenteMente		
Zero il folle	2019	1		Tattica/IndipendenteMente		FIMI: Gold
Zerosettanta vol. 3	2020	2		Tattica/IndipendenteMente		FIMI: Gold
Zerosettanta vol. 2	2020	1		Tattica/IndipendenteMente		FIMI: Gold
Zerosettanta vol. 1	2020	2		Tattica/IndipendenteMente		FIMI: Gold
Autoritratto	2023	2		Tattica/IndipendenteMente		
L'OraZero	2025	4		Tattica/IndipendenteMente		

== Filmography ==
=== Films ===
Film appearances showing year released, title, role played, director and notes
Title	Year	Role	Director	Notes
Io non protesto, io amo	1967	Dancing boy at the party	Ferdinando Baldi	Debut on screen
La bambolona	1968	Himself	Franco Giraldi	Cameo appearance
I ragazzi di Bandiera Gialla	1968	Singer	Mariano Laurenti	
Fellini Satyricon	1969	Extra	Federico Fellini	Uncredited
The Italian Connection	1972	Trini's friend	Ferdinando Di Leo	
Roma	1972	Extra	Federico Fellini	Uncredited
Orfeo 9	1973	The Happiness Seller	Tito Schipa	Rock musical; supporting role
Fellini's Casanova	1976	Organist	Federico Fellini	Cameo appearance
Ciao nì!	1979	Himself	Paolo Poeti	Cameo appearance
The Nightmare Before Christmas	1993	Jack Skellington (voice)	Henry Selick	Italian dub; voice role

=== Television ===
Television appearances showing year released, title, role played, network, and notes
Title	Year	Role	Network	Notes
Fantastico	1982–1984	Himself / co-host	Rai 1	Variety show (seasons 3 and 5)
Sanremo Music Festival 1991	1991	Himself / Contestant	Rai 1	Runner-up, with the song "Spalle al muro"
Mostra internazionale di musica leggera	1992	Himself / Presenter	Rai 1	Annual music ceremony
Sanremo Music Festival 1993	1993	Himself / Contestant	Rai 1	5° place, with the song "Ave Maria"
Dopofestival	1994	Himself / co-host	Rai 1	Special aired after the Sanremo Music Festival
Un disco per l'estate	1997–1998	Himself / co-host	Canale 5	Annual music festival
Ciao Darwin	1998	Himself / Guest	Canale 5	Episode: "Casalinghe VS Donne in carriera"
Tutti gli Zeri del mondo	2000	Himself / Presenter	Rai 1	Variety show
Live 8	2005	Himself / Performer	Rai 1	Special
X Factor	2009	Himself / Performer	Rai 2	Episode dated April 19, 2009
Sanremo Music Festival 2016	2016	Himself / Musical guest	Rai 1	Annual music festival
A raccontare comincia tu	2019	Himself / Guest	Rai 3	Episode: "Renato Zero"
Con il cuore - Nel nome di Francesco	2021	Himself / Guest	Rai 1	Musical program
