= RCA Italiana =

Defunct Italian record company

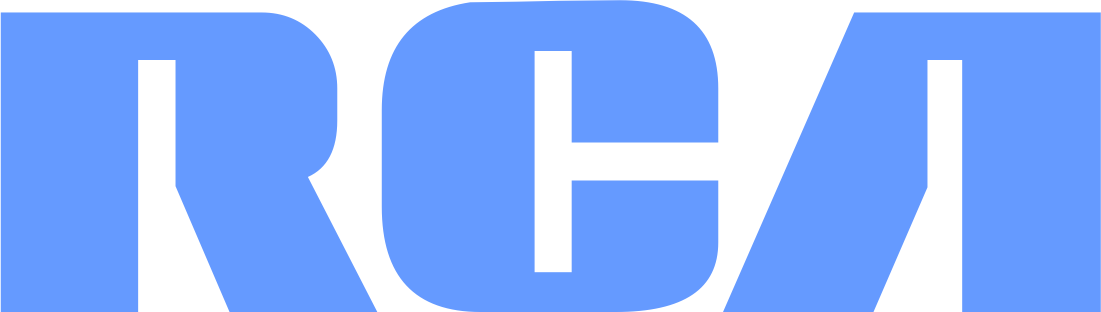
- Parent company: RCA Records
- Founded: 1949
- Defunct: 1987
- Genre: Various
- Country of origin: Italy
- Location: Rome

RCA Italiana was an Italian record company founded in 1949 and active until 1987, the date on which, together with the parent company RCA Records, it was bought by BMG Entertainment.

== History ==
Founded in Rome in 1949 under the Vatican's protection and with its historic location which housed the recording studios on Via Tiburtina, the record company closed around 1990 and was absorbed with its parent company by the Bertelsmann Music Group. Releases from the earlier part of the unit's existence were largely of imports of records that were made by its American parent, including Elvis Presley and Harry Belafonte, with the few recordings of Italian origin being contributed by Domenico Modugno, Nilla Pizzi and Katyna Ranieri.

RCA subsequently signed such artists as Nico Fidenco, Gianni Meccia, Jimmy Fontana, Edoardo Vianello, Rita Pavone, Nada, Gianni Morandi, Farida Gangi and Tony Del Monaco, who all would become prominent forces of the Italian record scene. At that time, the best-selling single was "Il mondo", a tune launched by the contest Un disco per l'estate in 1965, written and sung by Jimmy Fontana. Arrangements were written by Ennio Morricone and Luis Bacalov. RCA Italiana produced numerous fundamental albums of Italian rock between the last 1960s and the first 1970s. RCA's success in this field prompted the label to continue investing in young talents, such as the Rokes, Patty Pravo, Luigi Tenco, Dino and Lucio Dalla.

The 1970s continued with the success of singer-songwriters and new singers, including Claudio Baglioni, Francesco De Gregori, Paolo Conte, Ivano Fossati, Antonello Venditti, Renato Zero, Gabriella Ferri, Nicola Di Bari, Fiorella Mannoia, Riccardo Cocciante, Angelo Branduardi and Rino Gaetano.

Towards the end of the decade, the first period of economic crisis came due to the decline of the Italian record market and a series of bad choices. In 1978, RCA lost Claudio Baglioni and Antonello Venditti, and some singers didn't achieve the goals the label had desired from them.

In the 1980s, other artists left RCA's Italian unit, including Paolo Conte, Francesco De Gregori and Ivano Fossati, and the label never found replacements for them. The managing director also left the company, which is taken over by BMG Entertainment.

== See also ==
- Sony BMG
- RCA Records
