= Tom Merlynn =

American singer-songwriter

Tom Merlynn (July 26, 1955), is an American singer, Songwriter, Producer, Engineer known for his works with singer Joe Lynn Turner. Tom Merlynn has worked on hard rock projects such as Rated X, with Joe Lynn Turner, Carmine Appice, Tony Franklin and Karl Cochran on the Frontiers Record Label. Sunstorm (band), the Jan Holberg Project, Tobias Sammett - The Mystery of Time, Doo-wop group The Wizards featuring Joel Katz and many others. Tom has also written and produced various Television and Radio Commercials as well as many marketing projects for Thumann's, Inc., Carlstadt, NJ.

== Discography as a writer ==
- Battle for Your Heart (words) - Jan Holberg Project featuring Joe Lynn Turner - (2013)
- 50's Come Alive (words and music) - The Wizards (1981) Album, 50's Come Alive
- Street Corner (words and music) - The Wizards (1981) Album, 50's Come Alive
- Summer Love (words and music) - The Wizards (1981) Album, 50's Come Alive
- Guardian Angel (words and music) - The Wizards (1981) Album, 50's Come Alive
- A 1950's Singer (words and music) - The Wizards (1981) Album, 50's Come Alive

== Discography as Vocal producer for Joe Lynn Turner ==
- "The Seeker" - Who Are You: An All Star Tribute To The Who (2012)
- "Bloody Well Right - (feat Joe Lynn Turner and David Kersner) (Songs of the Century -- Tribute to Supertramp) 2012
- "Street of Broken Dreams" (feat. Joe Lynn Turner) (3:45) George Gakis (2012)
- "Jungle Love" (feat Joe Lynn Turner) (Fly Like an Eagle - An All Star Tribute to Steve Miller Band) 2012
- "The Watch Maker's Dream" - Avantasia - The Mystery of Time - (2013)
- "The Spectre" - Avantasia - The Mystery of Time - (2013)
- "Savior in the Clockwork" - Avantasia - The Mystery of Time - (2013)

=== Albums (vocal producer and engineer) ===
- Rated X, Rated X (band), Joe Lynn Turner, Carmine Appice, Tony Franklin, Karl Cochran (2014) album, vocal producer and engineer track list for Rated X
1. "Get Back My Crown" (Alessandro Del Vecchio, Joe Lynn Turner, Carmine Appice, Tony Franklin, Karl Kochran)
2. "This Is Who I Am" (Joe Lynn Turner, Chris Antblad)
3. "Fire and Ice" (Soren Kronqvist, Daniel Palmquist, Alessandro Del Vecchio)
4. "I Don't Cry no More" (Alessandro Del Vecchio, Joe Lynn Turner, Carmine Appice, Tony Franklin, Karl Kochran)
5. "Lhasa" (Soren Kronqvist, Daniel Palmquist, Alessandro Del Vecchio)
6. "Devil In Disguise" (Alessandro Del Vecchio, Joe Lynn Turner, Carmine Appice, Tony Franklin, Karl Kochran)
7. "You Are the Music" (Soren Kronqvist, Daniel Palmquist, Joe Lynn Turner)
8. "Peace of Mind" (Alessandro Del Vecchio, Joe Lynn Turner, Carmine Appice, Tony Franklin)
9. "Maybe Tonight" (Joe Lynn Turner, Chris Antblad)
10. On the Way to Paradise" (Alessandro Del Vecchio, Joe Lynn Turner, Carmine Appice, Tony Franklin, Karl Kochran)
11. Stranger In Us All" (Alessandro Del Vecchio, Joe Lynn Turner, Carmine Appice, Tony Franklin, Karl Kochran)
- Emotional Fire Sunstorm, Joe Lynn Turner (2012) album, vocal producer track list for Emotional Fire
1. Never Give Up (3:44) (Robert Säll, Sören Kronqvist)
2. Emotional Fire (3:52) (Michael Bolton, Diane Warren, Desmond Child)
3. Lay Down Your Arms (3:47) (Johan Stentorp)
4. You Wouldn't Know Love (3:51) (Michael Bolton, Diane Warren)
5. Wish You Were Here (3:35) (Daniel Palmqvist)
6. Torn In Half (3:51) (Sören Kronqvist)
7. Gina (4:00) (Michael Bolton, Keith Diamond, Bob Halligan Jr.)
8. The Higher You Raise (3:59) (Robert Säll, Daniel Palmqvist, Sören Kronqvist)
9. Emily (3:45) (Sören Kronqvist)
10. Follow Your Heart (4:03) (Sören Kronqvist)
11. All I Am (4:00) (James Martin, Mikey Wilson, Tom Martin, Isabell Oversveen)
12. The Silence (Japanese Edition Bonus Track)
- At Your Service, The Jan Holberg Project, feat. Joe Lynn Turner (2013) album, vocal producer track list for At Your Service
1. Battle for Your Heart (4:06) (Tom Merlynn / Jan Holberg)
2. Jealousy and Pride (5:24) (Jan Holberg)
3. Sensuality (3:38) (Jan Holberg)
