= Shane Gaalaas =

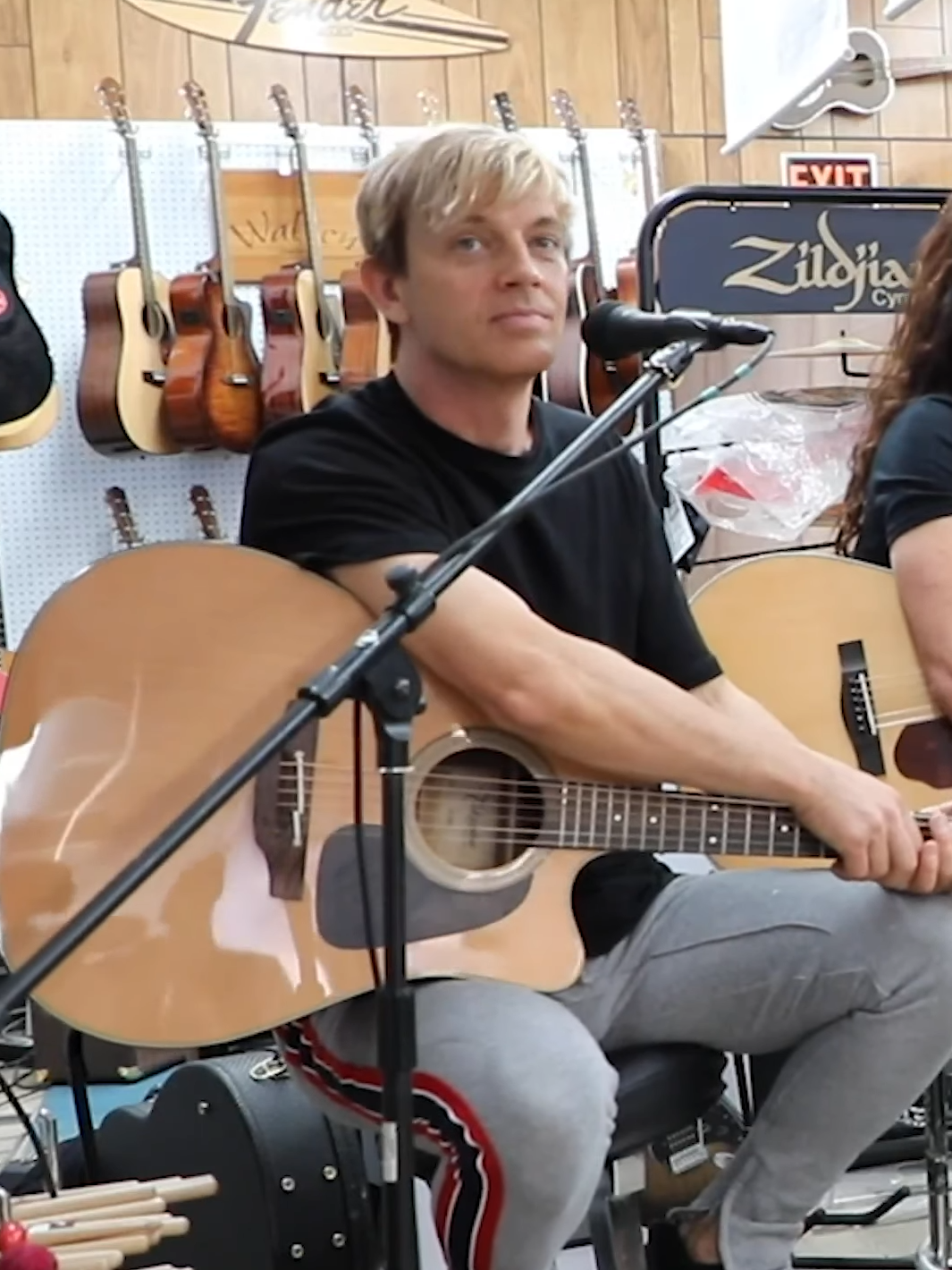
- Gaalaas in 2019

Background information
- Born: Innisfail, Alberta, Canada
- Genres: Hard rock, heavy metal, progressive rock, instrumental rock, jazz fusion
- Occupations: Musician, songwriter, producer
- Instrument: Drums
- Years active: 1986–present
- Label: Junk Man Records
- Website: http://www.shanegaalaas.com

Shane Gaalaas (born August 8) is a Canadian-born drummer, multi-instrumentalist and songwriter best known for his long running affiliation with Japanese rock superstars B'z, whom he joined in 2002, and his extensive work with guitar virtuosos Michael Schenker, Yngwie Malmsteen, Uli Jon Roth, Vinnie Moore, and Jeff Kollman.

Gaalaas is a founding member of progressive rock trio Cosmosquad and extreme metal band Diesel Machine and currently the drummer for all-Canadian all-star cover band Toque featuring Todd Kerns and Brent Fitz of Slash featuring Myles Kennedy and the Conspirators fame and guitarist Cory Churko. He has released several albums as a solo artist and continues to work as a session musician. Gaalaas is a graduate of Grant MacEwan Music College in Edmonton, Alberta and Percussion Institute of Technology in Hollywood, CA; he currently resides in the Los Angeles area.

== Biography ==
=== Formative years ===
Gaalaas was born in small town Innisfail, Alberta and began playing guitar at age nine and picked up the drums a year later. After hearing Kiss – Alive!, he begged his parents to take him to see Kiss on their Love Gun Tour in 1977. "That concert changed my life. It had so much impact on me, from that point on I knew what I was going to do in life."

Upon graduating high school, Gaalaas began touring professionally with a Top 40 group before enrolling to study jazz, percussion and piano at Grant MacEwan Music College in Edmonton, Alberta in 1987. For the next three years, Gaalaas toured with Canadian circuit bands. Throughout 1991, he recorded and toured with guitarist/producer Paul Dean of Loverboy fame in a band called The Heat.

=== Move to the U.S. ===
In 1993, Gaalaas moved to Los Angeles, CA to study at Musicians Institute, from which he graduated with Vocational Honors and also won the "Rock Drummer of The Year" award. Entering a Guitar Center drum competition, he caught the attention of one of the judges, Journey drummer Deen Castronovo, who would recommend him to guitarist Yngwie Malmsteen only days later. "I ended up flying out to Miami... and it wasn't really even an audition. I went there and got the gig and next week we were on the road. All because of Deen."

Moving on from Malmsteen after the Magnum Opus album touring cycle, Gaalaas and bassist Barry Sparks joined the Michael Schenker Group and went on to record several other projects together, including albums by vocalist John West and guitarists Miloš Dodo Doležal, Vinnie Moore, and Uli Jon Roth, while continuing to work with Schenker. In addition, Gaalaas and Sparks teamed up with guitarist Jeff Kollman to form the all-instrumental trio Cosmosquad. Gaalaas would also join forces with future Halford guitarist and Damageplan vocalist Patrick Lachman in Diesel Machine. Former Deep Purple bassist and Black Sabbath vocalist, Glenn Hughes, would recruit Gaalaas for the European leg of his 2001 tour which led to Shane working with Hughes and another Purple alumnus, vocalist Joe Lynn Turner, on both HTP studio albums.

=== Working with Jeff Kollman ===
Gaalaas has had an ongoing musical relationship with guitarist Jeff Kollman going back to the 1990s. Gaalaas met Kollman in 1997 in Phoenix, AZ while a member of MSG and the two had an instant rapport and musical connection, in addition to being born only days apart. Together with fellow MSG member, bassist Barry Sparks, the duo formed Cosmosquad with whom they have released 5 albums and one DVD to date. Their latest release, The Morbid Tango, was issued in early 2017. Other studio and live collaborations include albums by $ign of 4, feat. Phil Mogg of UFO, Hughes Turner Project, John West, Lao Tizer and Crumb Bros.. Gaalaas also appears on three of Kollman's solo albums, Shedding Skin, Live at the Baked Potato and Empower... Devour!!!.

=== Joining B'z ===
In 2002, Gaalaas was approached by Japanese music giants B'z to become the band's new touring drummer. His tenure lasted through 2018 during which time he was part of every B'z tour, studio, live and DVD release, starting with the a Beautiful Reel. B'z Live-Gym 2002 live DVD. Gaalaas was instrumental in the creation of the band’s first-ever English language release, the eponymous 2012 EP, for which he wrote all the lyrics and handled all the arrangements, as well as mixing and mastering the record with fellow Canadian Cory Churko. His replacement in B'z was Brian Tichy.

=== Solo ===
To date, Gaalaas has released 4 studio albums as a solo artist, Primer (2003), Hinge (2006), Ascend (2013), and Bitter Suites From The Red Room (2015), issued by Zain/Big M.F. in Japan and on his own Junk Man label in the rest of the world. Entirely self-produced, Gaalaas handles drums, lead vocals, guitars, bass, keyboards, programming and songwriting duties on all his records. B'z vocalist Koshi Inaba makes a guest appearance on Primer, which includes a cover of the B'z song, "Hadashi no Megami", for which Gaalaas also shot a promotional video. Canadian session musician Cory Churko contributes guitar to the songs "Brotherhood" and "Wish You Well" on Ascend.

Featuring on lead vocals and guitar, Gaalaas also released the Japan-only Live & Video Clips DVD (2005) and Live in Osaka CD (2006), with members of the Japanese rock band Schon rounding out the line-up. In 2009, Gaalaas released his first ever drum instructional DVD, Perfect Rock Drumming, via Rittor Music in Japan.

=== Latest projects ===
In 2012, Gaalaas collaborated with producer/programmer Peter Fernandes, guitarist Greg Howe and sometime Cosmosquad bassist Ric Fierabracci on the song "Dorothy", which was released as a digital single and eventually included on Fernandes' 2014 album, Q.E.D..

Gaalaas released back-to-back digital singles, "Tales From A Fantastic Lumbar", featuring Fernandes and Fierabracci, and "Silverstrand Sedation", in May and October 2014, respectively. Both cuts were included on Gaalaas' fourth studio album, Bitter Suites From The Red Room, his first ever all-instrumental offering, issued internationally in November 2015. Gaalaas also featured on Bob Frye's Uzoma album and has written and recorded the music for a video game titled Yakuza, due out in January 2016.

In late 2016, Gaalaas joined all-Canadian all-star cover band Toque featuring Todd Kerns, Brent Fitz, and Cory Churko whose debut album Give'R was released on December 23, 2016. Gaalaas made his studio debut with Toque on their 2019 sophomore release, Never Enough and appears in the video for the song "Never Enough of You".

On April 1, 2019, Gaalaas' extreme metal band, Diesel Machine, released "Shut It", their first new song in close to 20 years. The group's forthcoming sophomore album, Evolve, was set for a tentative fall release but pushed back to 2020. The album was finally released on August 21, 2020, through German company Metalville.

Gaalaas filled in on drums for Brent Fitz of Slash featuring Myles Kennedy and The Conspirators on August 6, 2019, at The Ryman Auditorium after Fitz had to have emergency surgery for a detached retina. It was announced that Gaalaas would fill in for Fitz for the remaining four shows of that tour.

== Acclaim ==
Japan's leading drum magazine, Rhythm & Drum, featured Gaalaas on the cover of their October 2013 issue ; he also been covered by the Japanese edition of Billboard, among other publications.

== Endorsements ==
Gaalaas is endorsed by Pearl drums, Zildjian cymbals, Vic Firth sticks, Remo drumheads, and DW drum pedals.

== Discography ==
Solo

- 2003 Primer
- 2005 Hinge
- 2005 Live & Video Clips DVD
- 2006 Live In Osaka
- 2009 Perfect Rock Drumming instructional DVD
- 2013 Ascend
- 2014 Tales From A Fantastic Lumbar [digital single]
- 2014 Silverstrand Sedation [digital single]
- 2015 Bitter Suites From The Red Room

Toque

- 2019 Never Enough

B'z

- 2002 a Beautiful Reel. B'z Live-Gym 2002 live DVD
- 2003 Big Machine
- 2004 Typhoon No.15 ~B'z Live-Gym The Final Pleasure live DVD
- 2005 B'z The Best "Pleasure II"
- 2005 The Circle
- 2006 Monster
- 2006 B'z Live-Gym 2006 "Monster's Garage" live DVD
- 2007 Action
- 2008 B'z Live in Nanba live DVD
- 2008 B'z The Best "Ultra Pleasure"
- 2008 B'z The Best "Ultra Treasure"
- 2009 B'z Live-Gym Pleasure 2008: Glory Days live DVD/Blu-ray
- 2009 Magic
- 2010 B'z Live-Gym 2010 Ain't No Magic live DVD/Blu-ray
- 2011 C'mon
- 2012 B'z Live-Gym 2011 C'mon live DVD/Blu-ray
- 2012 B'z EP
- 2013 B'z Live Gym 2008 "Action" live DVD/Blu-ray
- 2013 B'z Live Gym 2005 "Circle of Rock" live DVD
- 2013 B'z The Best XXV 1988-1998 (bonus tracks only)
- 2013 B'z The Best XXV 1999-2012
- 2014 B'z Live Gym 2013 Endless Summer XXV Best of live DVD/Blu-ray
- 2015 Epic Day
- 2016 B'z Live Gym 2015 Epic Night live DVD/Blu-ray
- 2017 Dinosaur
- 2018 B'z Live Gym 2017–2018 Live Dinosaur live DVD/Blu-ray

Crumb Bros.

- 2005 State of Your Mind

Hughes Turner Project

- 2002 HTP
- 2003 HTP 2

$ign of 4

- 2002 Dancing with St. Peter

Diesel Machine

- 2001 Torture Test
- 2020 Evolve

Uli Jon Roth

- 2000 Transcendental Sky Guitar

Vinnie Moore

- 1999 The Maze
- 2000 Live!
- 2006 Collection: The Shrapnel Years

Jeff Kollman

- 1999 Shedding Skin
- 2006 Live at the Baked Potato

Artension

- 1999 Forces of Nature
- 2000 Machines

Lao Tizer

- 1999 Golden Soul

Christopher Maloney

- 2002 – Control
- 2005 – The Terrors Of Intimacy

John West

- 1998 Permanent Mark

Cosmosquad

- 1997 Cosmosquad
- 2001 Squadrophenia
- 2002 Live at the Baked Potato
- 2003 Best of Cosmosquad
- 2007 Acid Test
- 2008 Lights... Camera... 'Squad! DVD
- 2017 The Morbid Tango

Michael Schenker Group

- 1996 Written in the Sand
- 1997 The Michael Schenker Story Live CD/VHS
- 1999 The Unforgiven
- 2000 The Unforgiven World Tour
- 2001 MS 2000: Dreams and Expressions
- 2005 Live in Tokyo 1997 DVD

Yngwie Malmsteen

- 1995 Magnum Opus

Compilations, Sessions & Guest Appearances

- 1997 Miloš Dodo Doležal – Dodo hraje Hendrixe
- 1998 Various – Overload: A Tribute to Metallica (w/ Diesel Machine)
- 1999 Mogg/Way – Chocolate Box
- 1999 Various – Call To Irons 2: A Tribute to Iron Maiden (w/ Diesel Machine)
- 2000 Various – Slave to the Power – The Iron Maiden Tribute (w/ Cosmosquad)
- 2000 Various – The Blues Tribute to Lynyrd Skynyrd (w/ Jeff Kollman)
- 2001 Various – Warmth in the Wilderness: A Tribute to Jason Becker (w/ Cosmosquad)
- 2003 Various – A Tribute to the Beast, Vol. 2 (w/ Cosmosquad)
- 2005 JKB – Bleeding the Soul
- 2005 Barry Sparks – Can't Look Back
- 2005 Kelly Keeling – Giving Sight To The Eye
- 2006 Schon – Frame of Portrait
- 2007 Jeff Marshall – Eucalyptus
- 2008 Arlene Kohl – One Day
- 2009 Josh Canova – Adios
- 2010 Chris Bullen – Interstellar Groove Machine
- 2010 Jeff Kollman Band – Empower... Devour!!!
- 2010 Koshi Inaba – Hadou
- 2010 Koshi Inaba – Okay
- 2014 Peter Fernandes – Q.E.D.
- 2015 Bob Frye – Uzoma
- 2015 Riot On Mars – First Wave
- 2024 Theo van Niel Jr. – Self-Education
