= Under Cover 2 =

Studio album by Joe Lynn Turner
- Released: June 15, 1999
- Genre: Hard rock
- Length: 52:04
- Label: Shrapnel
- Producer: Bob Held and Joe Lynn Turner

Joe Lynn Turner chronology
Hurry Up and Wait (1998)	Under Cover 2 (1999)	Holy Man (2000)

Professional ratings
Review scores
Source	Rating
AllMusic	3/5 stars

Under Cover 2 is the 5th solo album of Joe Lynn Turner released in 1999. Just like Under Cover, the album consists mainly of covers of Turner's favorite artists. Due to successful sales of the previous edition, the label asked him to record a follow-up. "The Race Is On" is a re-recorded version of a song that appeared on Turner's solo debut album, Rescue You.

"Lost in Hollywood" was recorded as a tribute to the late Cozy Powell who died in a car crash in 1998.

== Track listing ==
No.	Title	Writer(s)	Original artist	Length
1.	"Lady Double Dealer"	Ritchie Blackmore, David Coverdale	Deep Purple	4:02
2.	"Wishing Well"	Paul Rodgers, Simon Kirke, Tetsu Yamauchi, John Bundrick, Paul Kossoff	Free	3:33
3.	"Helter Skelter"	John Lennon, Paul McCartney	The Beatles	3:43
4.	"Rock Bottom"	Phil Mogg, Michael Schenker	UFO	4:29
5.	"Waiting for a Girl Like You"	Mick Jones, Lou Gramm	Foreigner	4:23
6.	"Movin' On"	Mick Ralphs	Bad Company	4:03
7.	"Rock and Roll, Hoochie Koo"	Rick Derringer	Edgar Winter's White Trash	3:19
8.	"The Boys Are Back in Town"	Phil Lynott	Thin Lizzy	3:46
9.	"Born to Be Wild"	Mars Bonfire	Steppenwolf	6:04
10.	"The Race Is On"	Al Greenwood, Joe Lynn Turner	–	3:31
11.	"Fool for Your Loving"	Coverdale, Bernie Marsden, Micky Moody	Whitesnake	4:41
12.	"Mississippi Queen""	Leslie West, Corky Laing, Felix Pappalardi, David Rea	Mountain	2:28
13.	"Lost in Hollywood"	Blackmore, Roger Glover, Cozy Powell	Rainbow	4:02
Total length:				52:04

== Personnel ==
- Joe Lynn Turner: Lead vocals, Backing vocals on 5, 7, 10
- Tony Bruno: Guitars
- Greg Smith: Bass
- Paul Morris: Keyboards
- Kenny Kramme: Drums

Guest Guitars

- Akira Kajiyama: Guitar on 1, 10, 11
- Jeff Golub: Guitar on 2
- Vernon Reid: Guitar on 3
- Goodfrey Townsend: Guitar on 6
- Rick Derringer: Guitar on 7
- Leslie West: Guitar on 12
- Al Pitrelli: Guitar on 13

Backing Vocals

- Steve Murphy: Backing vocals on 3, 5
- Evan Slamka: Backing vocals on 3, 5, 10
- Eric Miranda: Backing vocals on 3, 5, 10
- Bill Snodgrass: Backing vocals on 3
- Nancy Bender: Backing vocals on 7
- Dina Miller: Backing vocals on 7
