= Hurry Up and Wait (Joe Lynn Turner album) =

Hurry Up And Wait

Studio album by Joe Lynn Turner
- Released: 1998
- Genre: Rock
- Length: 48:21
- Label: Pony Canyon
- Producer: Bob Held & Joe Lynn Turner

Joe Lynn Turner chronology
Under Cover (1997)	Hurry Up And Wait (1998)	Under Cover 2 (1999)

Hurry Up And Wait is the 4th solo album by Joe Lynn Turner released in 1998. According to Turner, there were supposed to be two tracks on the album featuring Doogie White, 'Too Much is Not Enough' and 'Freedom's Wings', but the latter didn't make the album. Also, 'Too Much Is Not Enough' was first recorded for the unreleased follow-up of Rescue You. Afterwards, Joe recorded it with Deep Purple for the Slaves and Masters album. The song was also recorded by Paul Rodgers and Kenney Jones band The Law but it was never released. Original JLT version can be found in the bootleg "Demos '88 - 91' and The Law version can be found in "The Law II" bootleg. 'Freedom's Wings' was later recorded on Holy Man.

.

== Track listing (US version) ==
1. "We Will Survive"(Greenwood/Held/Pitrelli/Turner) – 3:58.
2. "Sex and Money" (Held/Teeley) – 4:00.
3. "Guilty Heart" (Greenwood/Held/Pitrelli/Turner/West) – 4:01.
4. "Days of Rage" (Held/Pitrelli/Turner) – 4:36.
5. "Game of Rock 'n' Roll" (Napoli/Turner) – 4:17.
6. "No Room for Love" (Held/Pitrelli/Turner) – 5:06.
7. "Sentimental" (Doddy/Guthrie/Guthrie) – 4:14.
8. "Too Much is Not Enough" (Greenwood/Held/Turner) – 4:18.
9. "Blueprint for the Blues" (Peterik/Turner) – 4:29.
10. "Can't Face Another Night" (Greenwood/Held/Pitrelli/Turner) – 5:07.
11. "Someday" (Greenwood/Held/Turner) – 4:15.

== Track listing (European version) ==
1. "No Room for Love" (Held/Pitrelli/Turner) – 5:06.
2. "Guilty Heart" (Greenwood/Held/Pitrelli/Turner/West) – 4:01.
3. "Sex and Money" (Held/Teeley) – 4:00.
4. "Shine On" (Greenwood/Turner) - bonus track
5. "Blueprint for the Blues" (Peterik/Turner) – 4:29.
6. "Game of Rock 'n' Roll" (Napoli/Turner) – 4:17.
7. "Too Much is Not Enough" (Greenwood/Held/Turner) – 4:18.
8. "Sentimental" (Doddy/Guthrie/Guthrie) – 4:14.
9. "Someday" (Greenwood/Held/Turner) – 4:15.
10. "Days of Rage" (Held/Pitrelli/Turner) – 4:36.
11. "We Will Survive"(Greenwood/Held/Pitrelli/Turner) – 3:58.
12. "Can't Face Another Night" (Greenwood/Held/Pitrelli/Turner) – 5:07.

== Personnel ==
- Joe Lynn Turner: Vocals, Backing vocals on 1,3,5,7,8,10,11. (US version)
- Al Pitrelli: Guitars on 1,3,4,6,10, Guitar solo on 5, Backing vocals on 3,4,5. (US version)
- Tony Bruno: Guitar on 2,5,7,8,9,11. (US version)
- Greg Smith: Bass, Backing vocals on 1,3,5,8. (US version)
- Kenny Kramme: Drums.
- Paul Morris: Keyboards except on 2. (US version)

Guest Musicians

- Chris Caffery: Guitar solo on 3, Backing vocals on 5.
- Bob Held: Guitar solo on 2.
- Al Greenwood: Additional keyboards on 10.
- Tom Teeley: Keyboards on 2, Backing vocals 2,10,11.
- Doogie White: Backing vocals on 8.
- Nancy Blender: Backing vocals on 1.
- Dina Miller: Backing vocals on 1,10,11.
- Kyle Gordon: Backing vocals on 1.
- Steve Bello: Backing vocals on 5,9.
- Jeb Guthrie: Backing vocals on 7,8.
- Jock Guthrie: Additional guitar on 7, Backing vocals on 2,7,8.
- Godfrey Townsend: Backing vocals on 1,5,9.
- Benny Harrison: Backing vocals on 8,11.
- Swan: Backing vocals on 1,5.
