= Sunstorm =

Sunstorm may refer to:

- Solar storm, a disturbance on the Sun
- Sunstorm (spacecraft), a Sun-observing satellite by ESA
- Sunstorm (novel), a 2005 novel by Arthur C. Clarke and Stephen Baxter.
- Sun Storm, a 2003 Swedish novel by Åsa Larsson
- Sunstorm Interactive, a former video game company
- Sunstorm (Transformers), a character from the Transformers universe
- Sunstorm (band), a hard rock project
- Sunstorm (Sunstorm album), 2006
- Sunstorm (John Stewart album), 1972
- Geomagnetic storm, a storm caused by solar wind
