= HTP 2 =

Studio album by Hughes Turner Project
- Released: 29 September 2003
- Genre: Hard rock, AOR, funk
- Length: 58:00 (European version); 62:40 (Japanese version)
- Label: MTM Music (Europe); Pony Canyon (Japan)
- Producer: Glenn Hughes; Joe Lynn Turner; Jeff Kollman; Mark Renk

Hughes Turner Project chronology
Live In Tokyo (2002)	HTP 2 (2003)

HTP 2 is the second album by the Hughes Turner Project, a collaboration between Glenn Hughes (Deep Purple, Black Sabbath, etc.) and Joe Lynn Turner (Rainbow, Yngwie Malmsteen, etc.); it was released in 2003 on MTM Music and Pony Canyon Records.

== History ==
The second album followed 2002's HTP and the Live In Tokyo recording. Between the two releases both Hughes and Turner had issued solo albums, Hughes’ Songs In The Key Of Rock and Turner's JLT. HTP 2 follows similar musical territory to the debut; a retro hard rock sound infused with AOR and some funk, with vocal trade-offs between the two singers.

JJ Marsh, Hughes’ regular guitarist features on the record and co-wrote many of the songs. Other musicians include Hughes’ keyboardist of the time Ed Roth and drummer Shane Gaalaas. There are special guest appearances from guitarists Steve Vai and Jeff Kollman and Red Hot Chili Peppers (now Hughes’ regular) drummer Chad Smith. Smith, Kollman and Roth later formed the all-instrumental group Chad Smith's Bombastic Meatbats, pulling in Kollman's former Edwin Dare bandmate, Kevin Chown, on bass.

The Japanese version of the album includes a bonus track entitled Keep On Shining.

JJ Marsh later recycled the instrumental middle part of "Lost Dreams" for his own song "The Change" on his solo album "Songs from Planet Marsh".

After the subsequent tour for the album Hughes and Turner agreed to put their collaboration on a permanent hiatus, so this is, to date, the final Hughes Turner Project recording. However the two did contribute vocals and lyrics to Moscow deputy mayor Mikhail Man’s 2005 album Made In Moscow.

== Track listing (U.S. / Europe Version) ==
1. "Revelation" – 4:09 (Hughes, Marsh, Turner)
2. "Alone I Breathe" – 4:15 (Hughes)
3. "Losing My Head" – 5:28 (Hughes, Marsh, Turner)
4. "Going My Way" – 4:26 (Hughes, Marsh, Turner)
5. "Hold On" – 5:28 (Hughes, Marsh, Turner)
6. "Lost Dreams" – 6:35 (Hughes, Marsh, Turner)
7. "Time and Time Again" – 5:46 (Hughes, Turner)
8. "Goodbye Friday" – 4:58 (Hughes)
9. "Burning the Sky" – 6:14 (Hughes, Marsh, Turner)
10. "Sofia" – 4:47 (Hughes, Marsh, Turner)
11. "Let's Talk About It Later" – 5:54 (Hughes)

=== Track listing (Japanese Version) ===
1. "Revelation" – 4:09 (Hughes, Marsh, Turner)
2. "Alone I Breathe" – 4:15 (Hughes)
3. "Losing My Head" – 5:28 (Hughes, Marsh, Turner)
4. "Going My Way" – 4:26 (Hughes, Marsh, Turner)
5. "Hold On" – 5:28 (Hughes, Marsh, Turner)
6. "Lost Dreams" – 6:35 (Hughes, Marsh, Turner)
7. "Time and Time Again" – 5:46 (Hughes, Turner)
8. "Goodbye Friday" – 4:58 (Hughes)
9. "Burning the Sky" – 6:14 (Hughes, Marsh, Turner)
10. "Keep On Shining" – 4:40 (Hughes, Marsh, Turner) *bonus track not on U.S. / Europe version
11. "Sofia" – 4:47 (Hughes, Marsh, Turner)
12. "Let's Talk About It Later" – 5:54 (Hughes)

== Personnel ==
- Glenn Hughes – vocals, bass
- Joe Lynn Turner – vocals
- JJ Marsh – guitars
- Shane Gaalaas – drums
- Ed Roth – keyboards
- Steve Vai – guitar solo on track 3
- Jeff Kollman – Guitar outro on track 9, Guitar solo on track 12
- Chad Smith – drums on track 3
