= GZP =

GZP may refer to:

- Gazipaşa Airport, in the Antalya Province, Turkey
- Gazpromavia, a Russian airline
- Gezi Party, a Turkish political party
