= Nothing's Changed (album) =

Studio album by Joe Lynn Turner
- Released: November 1995
- Genre: Hard rock
- Length: 54:57
- Label: Pony Canyon Records; PCCY-00847
- Producer: Joe Lynn Turner, Al Pitrelli

Joe Lynn Turner chronology
Rescue You (1985)	Nothing's Changed (1995)	Under Cover (1997)

Professional ratings
Review scores
Source	Rating
Allmusic	4/5 stars

Nothing's Changed is the second solo studio album by Joe Lynn Turner.

== Track listing ==
1. "Promise of Love" – 4:37 (Joe Lynn Turner/Tyler/Keys)
2. "I Believe" – 4:46 (Swersky/Midnight/Cross/Gian)
3. "Bad Blood" – 5:38 (Turner/de Carvalho/Borrelli/Kowal)
4. "Imagination" – 5:09 (de Carvalho/Borrell/Lafalce)
5. "Baby's Got a Habit" – 3:59 (Turner/Byrd/Mohawk)
6. "Satisfy Me" – 5:23 (Swersky/Cross)
7. "All or Nothing at All" – 4:22 (Turner/Al Pitrelli/Cross)
8. "Save a Place" – 4:13 (Turner/Sabu/House)
9. "Nothing's Changed" – 4:49 (Turner/Pitrelli/Held)
10. "Liviana's Intro" (Instrumental) – 0:15 (Turner)
11. "The Last Thing" – 3:31 (Turner/Swersky/Cross)
12. "Let Me Love You Again" – 4:24 (Turner/Pitrelli/Held/Brown)
13. "Knock Knock" – 3:51 (Turner/Pitrelli/Held)

== Personnel ==
- Joe Lynn Turner – vocals
- John O'Reilly – drums
- Al Pitrelli – guitars and keyboards
- Greg Smith – bass guitar
- Derek Sherinian – piano and keyboards (Tracks 1, 7, 8, 11 & 13)
- Gary Cobertt - keyboards

== Production ==
- Executive Producer – Mark Wexler
- Mixing – Paul Orofino
- Engineers – Paul Orofino, Roy McDonald and Dave Saronson
