= Under Cover (Joe Lynn Turner album) =

Studio album by Joe Lynn Turner
- Released: November 11, 1997
- Genre: Rock
- Length: 55:37
- Label: Shrapnel
- Producer: Bob Held, Fernando Krai and Joe Lynn Turner

Joe Lynn Turner chronology
Nothing's Changed (1995)	Under Cover (1997)	Hurry Up and Wait (1998)

Under Cover is the third solo album by Joe Lynn Turner, released in 1997. It consists mostly of covers by artists who had a great influence on Turner. On the Japanese version of the album, "Gimme Some Lovin" and "I'm a Man" are two separate tracks instead of one.

== Track listing ==
No.	Title	Writer(s)	Original artist	Length
1.	"We're an American Band"	Don Brewer	Grand Funk Railroad	3:32
2.	"Freedom"	Jimi Hendrix	Jimi Hendrix	4:04
3.	"Fire and Water"	Andy Fraser, Paul Rodgers	Free	4:57
4.	"Street Of Dreams"	Ritchie Blackmore, Joe Lynn Turner	Rainbow	5:14
5.	"Fortunate Son"	John Fogerty	Creedence Clearwater Revival	3:34
6.	"Vehicle"	Jim Peterik	The Ides of March	2:56
7.	"Hush"	Joe South	Joe South (Deep Purple version)	4:11
8.	"Unchained Melody"	Alex North, Hy Zaret	Alex North, Hy Zaret	3:49
9.	"Chained"	Frank Wilson	Marvin Gaye	3:40
10.	"Gimme Some Lovin'/I'm a Man"	Steve Winwood, Spencer Davis, Muff Winwood, Jimmy Miller	The Spencer Davis Group	6:44
11.	"Thief in the Night"	Rick Blakemore, Denny LaRue, Joe Lynn Turner	Fandango	3:49
12.	"Deal With the Preacher""	Paul Rodgers, Mick Ralphs	Bad Company	4:51
13.	"Sunshine of Your Love"	Pete Brown, Jack Bruce, Eric Clapton	Cream	4:16
Total length:				55:37

== Production notes ==
- Recorded and mixed at Unique Recording Studios in NYC
- Mixed and engineered by Fernando Krai
- Mastered at Masterdisk by Scott Hull
- Produced by Bob Held, Fernando Krai and Joe Lynn Turner
- Executive producer: Max Wexler

== Personnel ==
- Joe Lynn Turner: Lead vocals, Backing vocals on 1,2,3,5,6,7,9,10,11,12
- Tony Bruno: Guitar, Second solo on 13, Backing vocals on 5
- Greg Smith: Bass
- John O'Reilly: Drums
- Gary Corbett: Keyboards

Guest Musicians

- Al Pitrelli: Guitar solo 1,12
- Karl Cochran: Guitar solo on 13, Backing vocals on 2,5
- Sandi Saraya: Backing vocals on 5,7,9
- Peter Baron: Backing vocals on 6,11,12
- Nancy Bender: Backing vocals on 3,4,10
- Kaz Kojima: Backing vocals on 2,5
- Katie Mac: Backing vocals on 1
- Dina Miller: Backing vocals on 3,4,10
- Steve Murphy: Backing vocals on 6,11,12
- Janet Raines: Backing vocals on 5,7,9

Horns Section

- Don Harris: Trumpet on 6
- Bill Harris: Saxophone on 6
- John Fumalosi: Trombone on 6
- Mark Wexler: Percussion on 1,10,11
- Bob Held: Percussion on 10,11
- Louie Appel: Percussion on 4
