= Live in Germany =

Live in Germany may refer to:

- Live in Germany 1976, album by Rainbow
- Live in Germany (Joe Lynn Turner album)
- Live in Germany (Héroes del Silencio album)
