= Cem Köksal =

Turkish guitarist and entrepreneur (born 1976)

- Köksal in 2012

Background information
- Born: Reşit Cem Köksal; 3 July 1976 (age 50); Istanbul, Turkey
- Genre: Neoclassical metal
- Occupations: Guitarist; composer; entrepreneur
- Instrument: Electric guitar

Reşit Cem Köksal (born 3 July 1976) is a Turkish guitarist, composer and entrepreneur. His music includes neoclassical metal, and he has recorded and toured with singer Joe Lynn Turner. He was the founding chairman of the Gezi Party and is a co-founder of the electric guitar manufacturer Shark Guitars.

== Early life ==
Köksal was born in Istanbul on 3 July 1976. He began playing the mandolin in primary school and took up the guitar in 1987. While attending the German High School in Istanbul, he participated in school music activities and studied music theory with Derya Yener in 1991 and 1992.

== Music career ==
=== Solo albums and tours with Joe Lynn Turner ===
Köksal established his own recording studio, Studio 29, in 2002 and completed the recording of his debut album, Set Me Free!!, in 2003. Sources give its release year as either 2003 or 2004. (Note: A 2006 report in Hürriyet dates the release to 2003, while Apple Music lists 10 March 2004.) The album was released by Universal Müzik and featured vocals by Murat İlkan of Pentagram.

Köksal wrote the album's music and lyrics apart from one song, and recorded, mixed and produced it in his own studio. Aykan İlkan played drums on the recording. A Turkish edition was subsequently released as Just Set Me Free!!, with different cover artwork and additional Turkish-language songs.

Köksal performed on the Coca-Cola Soundwave tour in 2005. In May 2006, he toured Turkey with Joe Lynn Turner, the former singer of Rainbow and Deep Purple, as part of the Coca-Cola Soundwave tour. The band also included Çağatay Ateş on bass, Alpay Şalt on drums and Koray Alarslan on keyboards. In an interview with Burçin Aybars, Köksal said he had approached Turner by sending him his album and videos from the 2005 Soundwave tour. In a May 2007 interview, Turner described touring Turkey with Köksal as a "life changing experience" and said that it had influenced "Blood Red Sky", a song on his album Second Hand Life.

Their performances were released as Live!! in 2007. The concert DVD was recorded in Bursa. In 2007, Köksal also released the Turkish-language album Siyah Beyaz Masallar, featuring vocals by Şenay Lambaoğlu.

Köksal and Turner were billed to perform ahead of Joe Satriani at Küçükçiftlik Park in Istanbul on 18 May 2013.

=== Vigilante and Gitarizma ===
In 2011, Köksal released Vigilante Episode One, a five-track EP. The project was conceived as a concept album to be released in three five-song EPs. The first instalment contains three English-language songs sung by Mats Levén and two Turkish-language songs sung by Mehmet Kaya, and features a duet between Kaya and Zeynep Casalini.

In 2012, he performed with Gitarizma alongside Gür Akad, Alpay Şalt, Çağatay Ateş and Mert Topel. The project featured different guest guitarists at its concerts. Gitarizma opened for Megadeth in Istanbul on 19 June 2012, with Cenk Eroğlu and his son Kemal Efe Eroğlu also appearing in the performance.

== Gezi Party ==
Köksal was a founder and the first chairman of the Gezi Party, established following the Gezi Park protests in 2013. The founders submitted the party's application to the Turkish Interior Ministry on 1 October, and it was registered on 9 October. The party described constitutional reform, democracy and human rights as its aims. Reuters reported that Köksal described the chairmanship on Twitter as a spokesperson role and said that Gezi did not accept any leader. According to VOA Türkçe, he said he had taken the chairmanship because the role was legally required.

Writing in Der Freitag, Christopher Piltz reported concerns among participants in the Gezi movement that a new party could split the opposition. The party dissolved itself by a decision of its ordinary congress in October 2017.

== Shark Guitars ==
Köksal built his first Shark guitar in 2003 as a hobby. He continued to develop his guitar designs over the years. In 2018, Köksal, Bahtiyar Balcı and Bayram Tekçe founded Shark Guitars and opened their first workshop in Istanbul. Köksal described the guitars as modular instruments with removable necks and pickups that could be replaced without soldering. In 2023, Shark Guitars raised €2.5 million in its first funding round from 14 institutional and individual investors, including Nevzat Aydın and Neo Portföy.

In January 2025, Köksal told Ekonomist that the company had invested US$4.2 million in a 1,600-square-metre (17,000 sq ft) factory in Antalya. He said production was scheduled to begin that spring, with a planned annual output of 1,200 guitars. In February 2025, Anadolu Agency reported that the factory, located in the Antalya Organised Industrial Zone, was producing 100 guitars a month. In May 2025, Bloomberg reported that Shark was preparing for a new funding round. In July 2025, Milliyet reported that the factory was operating and that sales were primarily for export, with customers able to design and order guitars through an online tool.

In January 2026, New Atlas reported that Shark's factory had a production capacity of 120 instruments per month and that the company was accepting custom orders through an online store with a 3D guitar configuration tool.

== Discography ==
Studio albums

- Set Me Free!! (2003 or 2004)
- Siyah Beyaz Masallar (2007, Balet Plak)

Live albums

- Live!! (2007; with Joe Lynn Turner, CD and DVD)

EPs

- Vigilante Episode One (2011, IMM Müzik)
