= Hughes Turner Project =

British musical group

- Origin: England
- Genres: Funk rock; hard rock
- Years active: 2001–2004
- Labels: MTM Music; Pony Canyon
- Members: Glenn Hughes; Joe Lynn Turner
- Website: glennhughes.com joelynnturner.com htpsupportersclub.com

Hughes Turner Project (HTP) was a musical project formed in the 2001 by bassist/vocalist Glenn Hughes (formerly of Deep Purple and Black Sabbath, etc.) and vocalist Joe Lynn Turner (formerly of Rainbow, Deep Purple, and Yngwie Malmsteen's Rising Force). They released two albums, a live album and one joint project with Mikhail Men.

== History ==
Long time friends Glenn Hughes and Joe Lynn Turner had first planned to release an album together in 1989, the two got together and wrote some demos, but nothing ended up being released from these sessions.

In 2000 Hughes toured Japan with Turner, followed by joint appearances during the Voices of Classic Rock tour in 2001. During this time the two decided to start work on a new collaboration.

== First album ==
The duo released their first album in February 2002, it was simply called HTP. The album featured Hughes’ regular guitarist JJ Marsh, who contributed to much of the song-writing. There were also contributions drummer Shane Gaalaas and keyboardist Vince DiCola as well as guest guitarists John Sykes, Paul Gilbert and Akira Kajiyama.

The album featured the hard rock and AOR sounds that both Hughes and Turner had been known for, as well as a slight funk edge, brought in by Hughes’ bass lines, and exemplified in such tracks as "Sister Midnight" and "Better Man."

The pair hit the road for a Japanese tour, joined by native musicians Akira Kajiyama, Toshio Egawa and Yoshihiro Kudo. Their set-lists consisting of tracks from the HTP album as well as various numbers from their past bands including Deep Purple, Rainbow and Black Sabbath songs. Their shows at Shibuya Club Quattro in Tokyo were recorded for a live album which was released in August 2002, titled Live In Tokyo.

Hughes Turner Project continued their tour in Russia and Europe, this time joined by guitarist JJ Marsh keyboardist Joakim Svalberg and drummer Tomas Broman.

After the conclusion of the tour the Hughes Turner Project took a short break, during which Hughes released his solo album Songs In The Key Of Rock and Turner released JLT.

== Second album ==
In April 2003 the two got together to start work on a follow-up to the first album. The pair were joined again by guitarist JJ Marsh, drummer Shane Gaalaas and keyboardist Ed Roth, who had worked with Hughes on many of his solo albums. Special guests included Steve Vai, Jeff Kollman and Red Hot Chili Peppers drummer Chad Smith. Smith, Kollman and Roth would later unite under the name Chad Smith's Bombastic Meatbats, an all-instrumental 70s funk/fusion project.

The follow-up album, simply titled HTP 2 was released in September 2003 and was stylistically in a similar vein to the first record.

In early 2004 Hughes Turner Project again hit the road starting in Japan and then moving on to Russia and Europe. They were joined by the same musicians as the first HTP tour, except on the European leg where keyboardist Kjell Haraldsson replaced Joakim Svalberg.

After the conclusion of the tour the pair decided to put the Hughes Turner Project on an indefinite hiatus so they could focus more on their solo careers.

== Michael Men Project ==
Although the Hughes Turner Project had drawn to a close the pair travelled to Moscow in September 2004 to record vocals for an album composed and organised by Moscow’s deputy mayor Mikhail Men.

Men, who is also a professional musician had written the majority of the material for the project in the 1980s and after meeting the pair on their Russian tour had requested their services for the album. Hughes and Turner’s vocals were arranged in a similar way to the HTP albums and both contributed the majority of the lyrics.

The album, entitled Made In Moscow was released in July 2005 in Russia only and to date has not been made available outside of the country.

== Discography ==
=== Studio albums ===
- HTP (2002)
- HTP 2 (2003)

=== Live albums ===
- Live In Tokyo (2002)

=== Other Glenn Hughes/ Joe Lynn Turner collaborations ===
- Made In Moscow - Michael Men Project (2005)

== Line-up ==
- Glenn Hughes - Vocals/Bass
- Joe Lynn Turner - Vocals/Guitar

=== Additional studio musicians ===
- JJ Marsh – Guitar
- Shane Gaalaas – Drums
- Vince DiCola - Keyboards
- Ed Roth - Keyboards

=== Additional live musicians ===
- Akira Kajiyama - Guitar
- Yoshihiro Kudo – Drums
- Tomas Broman – Drums
- Toshio Egawa - Keyboards
- Joakim Svalberg - Keyboards
- Kjell Haraldsson - Keyboards
