= Holy Man (album) =

Studio album by Joe Lynn Turner
- Released: 2000
- Genre: Rock
- Length: 55:54
- Label: Mtm
- Producer: Bob Held & Joe Lynn Turner

Joe Lynn Turner chronology
Under Cover 2 (1999)	Holy Man (2000)	Slam (2001)

Holy Man is the 6th solo album of Joe Lynn Turner released in 2000. 'Freedoms Wings' was an outtake of Hurry Up and Wait and a reworked version was released on this album (the original version featured vocals of Doogie White).

== Track listing ==
1. "No Salvation" (Kajiyama/Turner) - 4:40
2. "Holy Man" (Held/Kajiyama/Turner) - 4:38
3. "Anything" (Held/Kajiyama/Turner) - 4:57
4. "Honest Crime" (Bonamassa/Held/Turner) - 4:10
5. "Wolves at the Door" (Bonamassa/Held/Turner) - 3:38
6. "Angel" (Bonamassa/Held/Turner) - 4:27
7. "Something New" (Cochran/Turner) - 4:41
8. "Love is Blind" (Held/Teeley) - 3:40
9. "Breaking Away" (Cochran/Young) - 2:50
10. "Midnight in Tokyo" (Held/Kajiyama/Turner) - 5:05
11. "Babylon" (Kajiyama/Turner) - 3:44
12. "Closer" (Kajiyama/Turner) - 4:53
13. "Too Blue to Sing the Blues" (Kajiyama/Pitrelli/Held/Brown) - 4:31

== Personnel ==
- Joe Lynn Turner: Lead vocals, Backing vocals on 2, 7–9, 12
- Akira Kajiyama: Guitar on 1–3, 10–13
- Eric Czar: Bass on 1–3, 10–13
- Greg Smith: Bass on 4–9
- Kenny Kramme: Drums
- Paul Morris: Keyboards

Guest Guitar

- Joe Bonamassa: Guitar on 4–6
- Karl Cochran: Guitar on 7, 9
- Al Pitrelli: Guitar final solo on 13, Additional guitars on 6
- Andy Timmons: Guitar solo on 4, 7
- Alan Schwartz: Guitar final solo on 6, 9
- Tom Teeley: Guitar on 8, Backing vocals on 2, 7, 9

Backing Vocals

- Nancy Bender: Backing vocals on 2, 7, 9, 12
- Tabitha Fair: Backing vocals on 2, 7, 9, 12
- Benny Harrison: Backing vocals on 8
- Eric Miranda: Backing vocals on 8
