= Fire Without Flame =

Fire Without Flames

Studio album by Akira Kajiyama + Joe Lynn Turner
- Released: December 7, 2005 (Japan); May 2006 (Europe)
- Genre: Hard rock
- Length: 53:10
- Label: AOR Heaven

Akira Kajiyama chronology
Max Body Groove - Goldbrick Live 2005 (2005)	Fire Without Flame (2005)	Singer (2006)

Joe Lynn Turner chronology
The Usual Suspects (2005)	Fire Without Flame (2005)	Second Hand Life (2007)

Fire Without Flame is a hard rock album by Akira Kajiyama and Joe Lynn Turner. This is the first release under both their names. Fire Without Flame is more of a return to Slam era sensibilities: a blistering blues infused hard rock album, on which Kajiyama handled all instruments and production himself. While absent of song writing credits, it’s assumed that Turner contributed all lyrics and vocal melodies.

== Track listing ==
1. "One Day Away" - 4:10
2. "Fire Without Flame" - 4:20
3. "Carnival of Souls" - 3:44
4. "Heart Against Heart" - 6:57
5. "End of the Line" - 4:45
6. "Forever Changed" - 5:57
7. "Bad Feeling" - 4:59
8. "Looking for Trouble" - 4:28
9. "Down and Dirty" - 4:34
10. "License to Kill" - 4:50
11. "Slow Burn" - 4:26

== Personnel ==
- Akira Kajiyama: Guitar, bass, keyboards
- Joe Lynn Turner: Vocals
- Toshyo Egawa: Keyboards
