= The Wizards of Winter =

American holiday music rock band

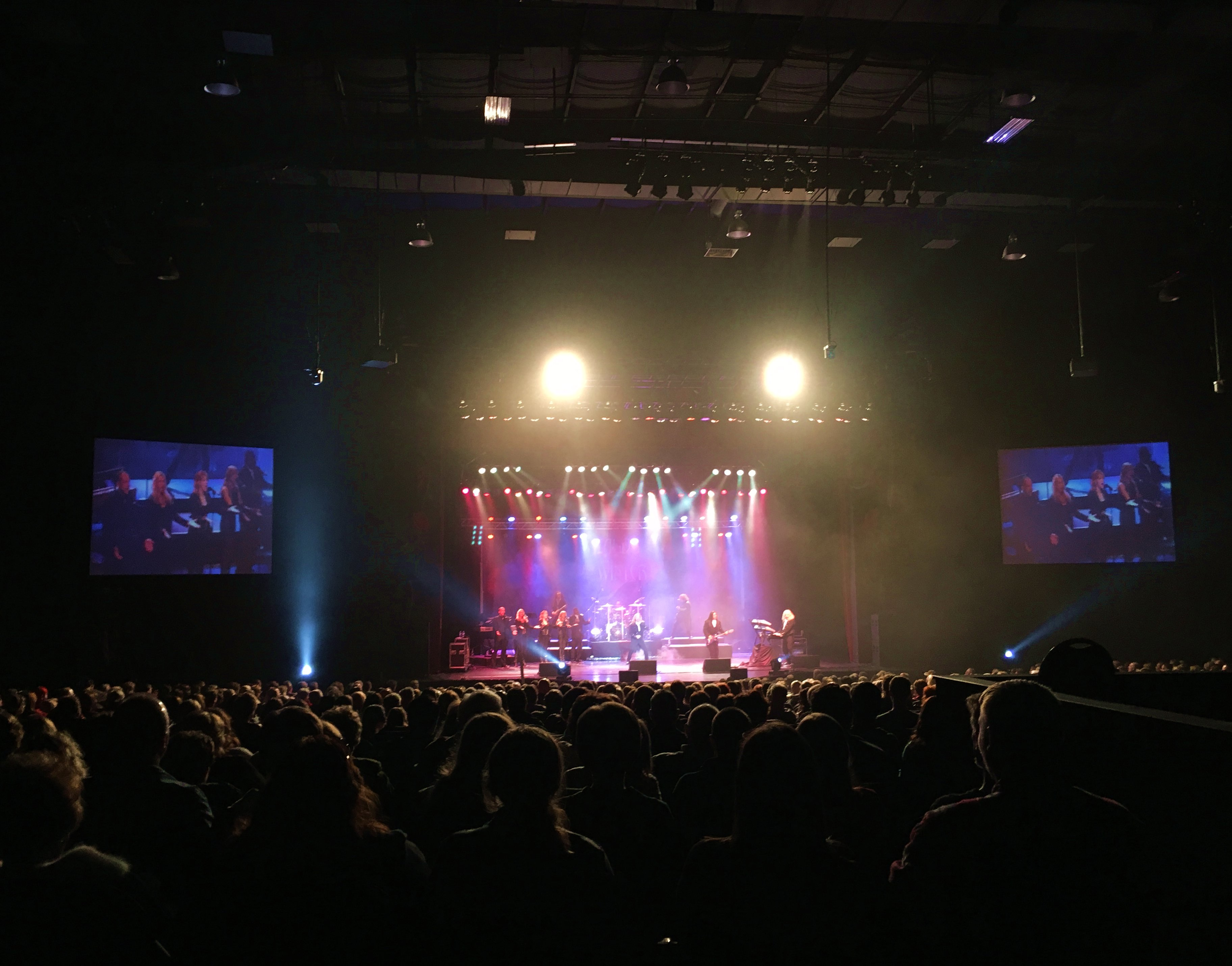
- The Wizards of Winter performing live at the Effingham Performance Center in Effingham, Illinois, December 18, 2015

Background information
- Genres: Christmas music, progressive rock, symphonic metal
- Years active: 2009–present
- Labels: Breaking Bands, LLC
- Spinoff of: Trans-Siberian Orchestra
- Members: Scott Kelly - Music Director, Keyboards; Sharon Kelly - Flute, Vocals; Fred Gorhau - Guitar; Steve Brown - Guitar; Greg Smith - Bass; John O. Reilly – Drums; Alexis Smith - Vocals, Keys; Guy LeMonnier – Vocals; Manny Cabo – Vocals; Tony Gaynor – Narration; Shawna Marie – Backing Vocals; Lacie Carpenter - Violin
- Website: www.thewizardsofwinter.com

The Wizards of Winter is a progressive rock holiday music band from the tri-state area of New York, New Jersey and Pennsylvania. They are an eclectic group of musicians with strong classical and progressive rock influences woven throughout their musical careers; three of the band's members are former members of Trans-Siberian Orchestra, with its name coming from the TSO composition "Wizards in Winter."

== History ==
The Wizards of Winter were formed in 2009 by Scott Kelly and Sharon Kelly as a way to give back to the local community. A holiday concert was held to support a local food pantry which was in severe financial straits. They continued to give back to the community through several successful holiday music performances in 2010. In 2011 the band embarked upon writing their own Christmas rock opera, Tales Beneath a Northern Star.

The Wizards of Winter released their own self-titled Christmas rock opera album based on entirely original material in 2014. In 2015, they released their second album, The Magic of Winter, which includes their single featured on Yahoo Music "The Spirit of Christmas". Cover art for both albums was designed by rock cover artist Ioannis.

Throughout their tours, the band supports several charities including BackPack Friends and Tunnels to Towers. In addition they donate proceeds from sales of their single "March Of The Metal Soldiers" to the Wounded Warrior Project. In 2014 The Wizards began working with Breaking Band LLC. Breaking Band is a joint venture between Jon Zazula, former CEO and Founder of Megaforce Records ( the man behind Metallica) and Chuck Billy of Testament.

The Wizards have toured with six of the original members of Trans-Siberian Orchestra (Tommy Farese, Guy LeMonnier, Tony Gaynor, Michael Lanning, John O. Reilly and Joe Cerisano). Guy LeMonnier and Tony Gaynor joined the band as an official members in 2014. In 2015 The Wizards of Winter toured with Greg Smith, longtime bassist-vocalist for Ted Nugent. In 2016, Greg Smith joined the band as an official member.

In November 2017, the band released a new single in advance of their tour. "Salzburg Carol" is a medley featuring segments of "My Favorite Things" and "Carol Of The Bells" arranged by keyboardist Scott Kelly.

In June 2018, long-time TSO drummer John O. Reilly joined the Wizards of Winter as a full member.

In September 2018, the band announced that vocalist Guy LeMonnier was not returning for the 2018 tour and welcomed Karl Scully of The Irish Tenors into the band. Also new to the band's lineup for the 2018 tour were guitarist Chris Green of Tyketto and vocalist Rebecca Graae.

In the Spring of 2019, it was revealed that the band were in the studio to record a new album and guitarist Steve Brown of Trixter/Def Leppard had joined the band.

September 2019 saw the release of their 10-song album, The Christmas Dream. Music videos were released for "Handel's Torch" and "Secrets of the Snowglobe". The album includes four instrumental and six vocal songs, with vocalists Sharon Kelly, Karl Scully, and Vincent Jiovino singing lead. Vincent Jiovino and Karl Scully left the band after the 2019 tour. The band did not tour in 2020 due to Covid restrictions. The 2021 tour saw the return of Guy Lemmonier and the introduction of Manny Cabo who was best known for being a Season 9 finalist on NBC's The Voice

During their 2023 tour the Wizards filmed a 2-hour made for TV Holiday special with " Song of the Mountains" for PBS. It is airing nationwide in (2) one hour programs. The band released a double live album titled "The Wizards of Winter Live Volume I & Volume II" that was recorded during the PBS event and others during the 2023 tour. It began shipping in November 2024.

== Discography ==
- Tales Beneath a Northern Star (2011)
- The Wizards of Winter (2014)
- The Magic of Winter (2015)
- The Christmas Dream (2019)
- The Wizards of Winter Live Volume I & Volume II (2024)
