= B'z Live-Gym Hidden Pleasure: Typhoon No.20 =

B'z Live-Gym Hidden Pleasure 〜Typhoon No.20〜

Video by B'z
- Released: December 10, 2008
- Genre: Hard rock
- Length: 2:44:00
- Label: B-Vision
- Producer: Tak Matsumoto

B'z chronology
B'z Live in Nanba (2008)	B'z Live-Gym Hidden Pleasure 〜Typhoon No.20〜 (2008)	B'z Live-Gym Pleasure 2008 -Glory Days- (2009)

B'z Live-Gym Hidden Pleasure 〜Typhoon No.20〜 is the eighteenth live DVD by the Japanese rock duo B'z, released on December 10, 2008. Following the release of two compilations to celebrate 20 years of the band's career, the DVD is also a compilation featuring live footage of several different "Live-Gyms" by them.

== Track listing ==
=== Disc 1 ===
1. Fireball
2. Pleasure 2000 -Jinsei no Kairaku- (Pleasure 2000 〜人生の快楽〜)
3. Koi-Gokoro (恋心)
4. Blowin'
5. Be There
6. Nagai Ai (ながい愛)
7. Don't Leave Me
8. Negai (ねがい)
9. Oh! Girl
10. Deep Kiss
11. Real Thing Shakes
12. Konya Tsuki no Mieru Oka ni (今夜月の見える丘に)
13. Time
14. Ainomama ni Wagamama ni Boku wa Kimidake o Kizutsukenai (愛のままにわがままに 僕は君だけを傷つけない)

=== Disc 2 ===
1. Calling
2. Ring
3. Motel
4. Gimme Your Love -Fukutsu no Love Driver- (不屈の)
5. Swimmer yo 2001!! (スイマーよ 2001!!)
6. Mienai Chikara -Innvisible One- (ミエナイチカラ -Innvisible One-)
7. Zero
8. Liar! Liar!
9. juice
10. Samayoeru Aoi Dangan (さまよえる蒼い弾丸)
11. Arakure (アラクレ)
12. ultra soul
13. Dakara Sono Te o Hanashite (だからその手を離して)
14. Hadashi no Megami (裸足の女神)
15. Banzai
16. Run

=== Disc 3 ===
1. Spirit LOOSE" 「Opening Movie」
2. # 1090 -Thousand Dreams-
3. Hana (華)
4. Fuusen (風船)
5. Tookumade (遠くまで)
6. Dattara Agechaeyo (だったらあげちゃえよ)
7. Skin
8. Logic
9. Stay Green -Mijyuku na Tabi wa Tomaranai- (Stay Green 〜未熟な旅はとまらない〜)
10. "juice" 「1CAM」
11. "juice" 「2CAM」
12. "juice" 「3CAM」

== Certifications ==
Region	Certification	Certified units/sales
Japan (RIAJ)	Gold	100,000^{^}
^{^} Shipments figures based on certification alone.

== Personnel ==
- Takahiro Matsumoto - producer, guitar
- Koshi Inaba - vocalist
