= Edge of Tomorrow (Sunstorm album) =

Studio album by Sunstorm
- Released: April 27, 2016 (Japanese edition); May 13, 2016 (International edition)
- Studio: Ivorytears Music Works, Somma Lombardo, Italy; Domination Studios, San Marino, San Marino; TKL Studios, Hohokus, NJ, USA
- Genre: Hard rock; heavy metal
- Length: 51:52 (International edition); 56:49 (Japanese edition)
- Label: Frontiers (International version); Ward (Japanese edition)
- Producer: Alessandro Del Vecchio

Sunstorm chronology
Emotional Fire (2012)	Edge of Tomorrow (2016)	The Road to Hell (2018)

Singles from Edge of Tomorrow
- 1. "The Sound of Goodbye" Released: March 16, 2016; 2. "Edge of Tomorrow" Released: April 12, 2016; 3. "Everything You've Got" Released: April 29, 2016; 4. "Don't Walk Away from a Goodbye" Released: May 5, 2016

Professional ratings
Review scores
Source	Rating
Metal Rules	4/5 stars

Edge of Tomorrow is the fourth album by Sunstorm featuring singer Joe Lynn Turner. It was released on May 13, 2016 via Frontiers Records, four years after Emotional Fire in 2012. This is the first album with Italian multi-instrumentalist Alessandro Del Vecchio (Hardline, Jorn, Edge of Forever) on producing, songwriting, keyboards and Italian musicians Simone Mularoni (DGM) on guitars, Nik Marzucchoni (Labyrinth) on bass guitar and the only one to feature Francesco Jovino (Voodoo Circle, Jorn) on drums.

The album was preceded by the singles "The Sound of Goodbye" on March 16, "Edge of Tomorrow" on April 12, "Everything You've Got" on April 29 and "Don't Walk Away from a Goodbye" on May 5, 2016.

== Track listing ==
No.	Title	Writer(s)	Length
1.	"Don't Walk Away From A Goodbye"	Alessandro Del Vecchio, Simone Mularoni	5:08
2.	"Edge Of Tomorrow"	Del Vecchio, Mularoni	6:07
3.	"Nothing Left to Say"	Del Vecchio, Mularoni	4:55
4.	"Heart of the Storm"	Del Vecchio, Mularoni	4:44
5.	"The Sound of Goodbye"	Jim Peterik	5:25
6.	"The Darkness of This Dawn"	Del Vecchio, Sören Kronqvist, Daniel Palmqvist	4:25
7.	"You Hold Me Down"	Del Vecchio, Muraloni	4:20
8.	"Angel Eyes"	Del Vecchio	4:57
9.	"Everything You've Got"	Del Vecchio, Kronqvist, Palmqvist	4:06
10.	"Tangled in Blue"	Del Vecchio, Kronqvist, Palmqvist	3:33
11.	"Burning Fire"	Del Vecchio, Palmqvist	4:11
Total length:			51:52

Japanese edition bonus track
No.	Title	Writer(s)	Length
12.	"Angel Eyes" (acoustic version)	Del Vecchio	4:57
Total length:			56:49

== Personnel ==
Sunstorm

- Joe Lynn Turner - vocals
- Alessandro Del Vecchio - keyboards, Hammond organ, backing vocals, producing, recording, mixing, mastering
- Simone Mularoni - guitars
- Nik Mazzucconi - bass guitar
- Francesco Jovino - drums

Additional personnel

- Serafino Perugino - executive producer
- Mattia Stancioiu - production assistant
- Giulio Cataldo - art director
- Nello Dell'Omo - artwork
