= The Magic of Winter =

Studio album by The Wizards of Winter
- Released: November 12, 2015
- Genres: Symphonic rock, Christmas music Rock Opera Progressive Rock
- Label: Breaking Bands
- Producer: Eric Rachel

The Magic of Winter is the second album by the Wizards of Winter, a Christmas music rock opera composed of vocal and instrumental songs. The music was written by Scott Kelly, Fred Gorhau, Sharon Kelly and Steve Ratchen. Cover art created by Ioannis. The music video for the single, "Spirit of Christmas," debuted on November 2, 2015 on Yahoo Music and was filmed at The Sherman Theater in East Stroudsburg, Pennsylvania The album was performed live for the first time during the band's 2015 Christmas Tour.

== Critical reception ==
Professional ratings
Review scores
| Source | Rating |
|---|---|
| BraveWords.com | 8.5/10 stars |
| Metal Temple Magazine | 9/10 stars |
| SeaOfTranquility.org | 4/5 stars |

Awarding the album 8.5 stars out of 10 at BraveWords.com, Aaron Small states, "The Wizards Of Winter have graced us with a wonderful soundtrack for the festive season. Whether you’re putting up the tree or wrapping presents, this 10-track CD provides endless amounts of joy...Guy LeMonnier sings "The Spirit Of Christmas" – an absolutely perfect holiday song that stops you in your tracks..."Waken To The Sound" is in itself a masterpiece...Instrumental tracks "Season’s Lament" and "Christmas Cotillion" will satisfy both the guitar geeks and old fuddy-duddys; seasonal splendour perfectly displayed on six strings." Marcus Garcia, writing for Metal Temple Magazine, rated the album a 9 out of 10, writing "It's elegant, grandiose, melodic and tender, but with the due amount of weight their music needs to exist...It's not only to be heard on Christmas, but the whole year..."Ebeneezer" is an old Christmas tale, that now is translated into a very good song, done with a Classical insight, with great pianos, and great contrast between male and female voices". Jon Neudorf of Sea of Tranquility scored the album a 4 out of 5, highlighting the opening song, "With snippets from the classic "Little Drummer Boy", "Flight Of The Snow Angels" begins the disc in dramatic fashion. A huge keyboard arrangement and grandiose rhythms lead to soaring lead guitar and snippets of neoclassical shredding. The melody is joyful and upbeat and the orchestrations certainly invoke the spirit of Christmas." and adding "Is it an enjoyable listen? You bet it is. If you dig what the Trans-Siberian Orchestra has been doing the last number of years there is little doubt you will find The Magic Of Winter much to your liking. Another excellent four star release!"

== Track listing ==
| No. | Title | Length |
|---|---|---|
| 1. | "Flight of the Snow Angels" (instrumental) | 3:52 |
| 2. | "Winter Magic" | 4:18 |
| 3. | "Spirit of Christmas" | 4:54 |
| 4. | "Season’s Lament" (instrumental) | 4:28 |
| 5. | "Waken to the Sound" | 4:20 |
| 6. | "Christmas Cotillion" (instrumental) | 3:37 |
| 7. | "I am Here" | 3:25 |
| 8. | "Ebeneezer" | 6:16 |
| 9. | "With One Voice" | 3:59 |
| 10. | "Reprise" | 1:13 |

=== Performers ===
==== Vocals ====
- Sharon Kelly
- Mary McIntyre
- Guy Lemonnier
- Vincent Jiovino

==== Orchestra ====
- Scott Kelly - Keyboards
- Steve Ratchen- Bass
- Fred Gorhau- Guitar
- Tommy Ference- Drums
- Mark DeGregory- Drums

== References to other carols and works ==
- "With One Voice" is a reworking of "Hark! The Herald Angels Sing".
- "Ebeneezer," refers to the character from Charles Dickens A Christmas Carol and is sung from the point of view of the Ghosts of Christmas
- "Flight of the Snow Angles" borrows from The Little Drummer Boy
