= House of Dreams (album) =

Studio album by Sunstorm
- Released: April 17, 2009
- Studio: Trakshak Studio, Karlsdorf, Germany; Voodooland Studios, Bound Brook, New Jersey, United States
- Genre: Pop rock, arena rock
- Length: 49:00
- Label: Frontiers
- Producer: Dennis Ward

Sunstorm chronology
Sunstorm (2006)	House of Dreams (2009)	Emotional Fire (2012)

House of Dreams is the second album by the AOR side project of former Rainbow vocalist Joe Lynn Turner under the name Sunstorm. It was released by Frontiers Records in Europe on April 17, 2009. The album was then released in Japan with the exclusive bonus track "Standing in the Fire" on June 24, 2009.

The song "I Found Love" was originally a Joe Lynn Turner solo track he performed live in the 1980s.

== Track listing ==
1. "Divided" - 4:37 (James Martin, Tom Martin, Mikey Wilson)
2. "Don't Give Up" - 4:48 (J. Martin, T. Martin)
3. "The Spirit Inside" - 4:01 (J. Martin, T. Martin)
4. "I Found Love" - 3:59 (Joe Lynn Turner, Patrick Cowden Hyde)
5. "Say You Will" - 4:33 (Jim Peterik)
6. "Gutters of Gold" - 4:38 (Peterik)
7. "Save a Place (In Your Heart)" - 4:13 (Lynn Turner, James House, Neal Debrah L, Paul Sabu)
8. "Forever Now" - 4:16 (Lynn Turner, Bob Held)
9. "Tears on the Pages" - 4:35 (Jon Lind, Jim Peterik, Russ Ballard)
10. "House of Dreams" - 4:51 (J. Martin, T. Martin)
11. "Walk On" - 4:35 (Lynn Turner, Desmond Child)
12. "Standing in the Fire" - 4:15 (Joe Lynn Turner, Marc Muller) {Japanese edition bonus track}

== Personnel ==
Sunstorm

- Joe Lynn Turner - vocals, production
- Dennis Ward - bass guitar, backing vocals, additional guitars, production, recording, mixing, mastering
- Uwe Reitenauer - guitars
- Gunther Werno - keyboards
- Chris Schmidt - drums

Guest musicians

- Thorsten Koehne - solo guitars
- Marco Bayati - additional solo guitar on "I Found Love"

Production

- Karl Cochran - vocals production
- Serafino Perugino - executive producer
