= Live in Tokyo (Hughes Turner Project album) =

Live In Tokyo

Live album by Hughes Turner Project
- Released: 21 August 2002
- Genre: Hard rock AOR Funk
- Length: 72:35 (European vsn); 75:22 (Japanese vsn)
- Labels: MTM Music (Europe); Pony Canyon (Japan)
- Producers: Glenn Hughes; Joe Lynn Turner; Akira Kajiyama

Hughes Turner Project chronology
HTP (2002)	Live In Tokyo (2002)	HTP 2 (2003)

Professional ratings
Review scores
Source	Rating
Allmusic	link
RevelationZ	link

Live In Tokyo is a live album by Hughes Turner Project, a collaboration between Glenn Hughes (Deep Purple/ Black Sabbath/ Trapeze) and Joe Lynn Turner (Deep Purple/ Rainbow/ Yngwie Malmsteen); it was released in 2002 on MTM Music and Pony Canyon Records.

== History ==
Live In Tokyo was the only live record to be released by the Hughes Turner Project. The album was recorded at the Shibuya Club Quattro in Tokyo, Japan on May the 17th and 19th 2002 on the first leg of their tour to support their debut album HTP.

The set-list comprises four songs from the HTP album as well as other songs from both Hughes and Turner’s back catalogues including Deep Purple, Rainbow and Black Sabbath numbers. For the most part the two sing their own songs solo, only performing duets on the HTP songs.

For the Japanese leg of tour the pair were joined by native musicians Akira Kajiyama (guitar), Toshio Egawa (keyboards) and Yoshihiro Kudo (drums). While Kajiyama had contributed some guitar solos to the HTP album, the others had not taken part in its recording and this is the only Hughes Turner Project release they appear on.

The European version of the album included the studio track Against The Wall, which had originally been released as the bonus track on the Japanese version of HTP. However, the European version excludes the live recording of the Black Sabbath track "No Stranger to Love", which only appears on the Japanese version.

== Track listing ==
1. "Devil's Road" – 6:11 (Hughes, Marsh, Turner)
2. "You Can't Stop Rock and Roll" – 4:45 (Hughes, Marsh, Turner)
3. "Death Alley Driver" – 4:22 (Blackmore, Turner)
4. "I Surrender" – 4:11 (Ballard)
5. "Stormbringer" – 4:41 (Blackmore, Coverdale)
6. "Dark Days" – 3:57 (Kajiyama, Turner)
7. "Mistreated" – 9:15 (Blackmore, Coverdale)
8. "No Stranger To Love" – 7:23 (Tony Iommi) (Japanese and USA version CDs only)
9. "Can't Stop the Flood" – 3:41 (Hughes, Marsh)
10. "Better Man" – 6:00 (Hughes)
11. "Ride the Storm" – 4:03 (Hughes, Marsh, Turner)
12. "King of Dreams" – 6:44 (Blackmore, Glover, Turner)
13. "Street of Dreams" – 5:01 (Blackmore, Turner)
14. "Spotlight Kid" – 5:08 (Blackmore, Glover)
15. "Against The Wall" – 4:36 (Hughes, Marsh, Turner) (European version only)

== Personnel ==
- Glenn Hughes – Vocals/ Bass
- Joe Lynn Turner – Vocals/ Guitar
- Akira Kajiyama – Guitars
- Yoshihiro Kudo – Drums
- Toshio Egawa – Keyboards
