= The Road to Hell (Sunstorm album) =

Studio album by Sunstorm
- Released: June 8, 2018
- Studio: Ivorytears Music Works, Somma Lombardo, Italy; Studio Faust Records and First Floor Studios, Prague, Czech Republic; Domination Studio, San Marino, San Marino; Oyez Studio, Lecco, Italy
- Genre: Hard rock; Soft rock
- Length: 45:28 (International edition); 49:52 (Japanese edition)
- Label: Frontiers (International edition); Ward Records (Japanese edition); Irond (Russian edition)
- Producer: Alessandro Del Vecchio

Sunstorm chronology
Edge of Tomorrow (2016)	The Road to Hell (2018)	Afterlife (2021)

Singles from The Road to Hell
- 1. "Only the Good Will Survive" Released: April 16, 2018; 2. "The Road to Hell" Released: May 16, 2018

Professional ratings
Review scores
Source	Rating
Metal Heads Forever	7.4/10 stars
Metal Temple	9.5/10 stars
The Rocktologist	8/10 stars
Sonic Perspectives	7.5/10 stars

The Road to Hell is the fifth studio album recorded by Sunstorm featuring American singer Joe Lynn Turner, with production from Hardline's Italian multi-instrumentalist Alessandro Del Vecchio. It is the only album with Edo Sala on drums and the last to feature founding vocalist Turner.

It was released via Frontiers Records on June 8, 2018 and it was preceded by the singles "Only The Good Will Survive" on April 16, 2018 and "The Road to Hell" on May 16, 2018.

== Track listing ==
No.	Title	Writer(s)	Length
1.	"Only the Good Will Survive"	Alessandro Del Vecchio, Simone Mularoni, Joe Lynn Turner	4:14
2.	"The Road to Hell"	Del Vecchio, Jonas Hornqvist	4:23
3.	"On the Edge"	Del Vecchio, Soren Kronqvist, Daniel Palmqvist, Turner	3:54
4.	"Blind the Sky"	Del Vecchio, Mularoni, Turner	4:33
5.	"My Eyes on You"	Del Vecchio, Pete Alpenborg, Turner	4:26
6.	"Future to Come"	Del Vecchio, Turner	3:34
7.	"Everywhere"	Del Vecchio, Turner	4:24
8.	"Resurrection"	Del Vecchio, Mularoni, Turner	3:57
9.	"Calling"	Del Vecchio, Mularoni, Turner	4:20
10.	"State of the Heart"	Del Vecchio, Alpenborg, Turner	3:27
11.	"Still Fighting"	Del Vecchio, Mularoni, Turner	4:16
Total length:			45:28

Japanese edition bonus track
No.	Title	Writer(s)	Length
12.	"Everywhere" (acoustic version)	Del Vecchio, Turner	4:24

== Personnel ==
Sunstorm

- Joe Lynn Turner - vocals
- Alessandro Del Vecchio - keyboards, Hammond organ, backing vocals, production, recording, mixing, mastering
- Simone Mularoni - guitars, recording
- Nik Mazzucconi - bass guitar
- Edo Sala - drums

Additional personnel

- Serafino Perugino - executive producer
- Maya Kozyrava - vocal co-production, management
- Derek Saxenmeyer - vocals recording
- Maor Appelbaum - remastering
- Andrea Seveso - assistant
- Giulio Cataldo - art direction
- Nello Dell'Omo - artwork
- Mark Weiss - JLT photos
