= Live in Germany (Joe Lynn Turner album) =

Live album by Joe Lynn Turner
- Released: October 10, 2008
- Recorded: September 30, 2007 at Rock Fabrik in Ludwigsburg, Germany
- Genre: Hard rock
- Length: 79:48
- Label: Frontiers Records

Joe Lynn Turner chronology
| Second Hand Life (2007) | Live in Germany (2008) |

Live in Germany is the first live album of rock singer Joe Lynn Turner. It was recorded live at the United Forces Of Rock Festival at the Rock Fabrik in Ludwigsburg, Germany. The main focus of this record is on his Rainbow period, where nine out of thirteen tracks come from. The Japanese version contains a bonus track, Deep Purple classic "Highway Star".

== Track listing ==
1. "Death Alley Driver"
2. "I Surrender"
3. "Power"
4. "Street of Dreams"
5. "Power of Love"
6. "Can't Let You Go"
7. "Jealous Lover"
8. "Your Love Is Life"
9. "Blood Red Sky"
10. "Stone Cold"
11. "Can't Happen Here"
12. "Spotlight Kid"
13. "Burn"

== Personnel ==
- Joe Lynn Turner - Lead vocals
- Karl Cochran - Guitar
- Greg Smith - Bass
- Mike Sorrentino - Drums
- Carmine Giglio - Keyboards
