= The Usual Suspects (album) =

Studio album by Joe Lynn Turner
- Released: February 23, 2005
- Genre: Rock
- Length: 48:35 (Japan standard edition); 44:55 (European version)
- Labels: Yamaha Music Communications, Co., Ltd.
- Producers: Bob Held & Joe Lynn Turner

Joe Lynn Turner chronology
JLT (2003)	The Usual Suspects (2005)	Fire Without Flame (2005)

Professional ratings
Review scores
Source	Rating
Allmusic	3.5/5 stars

The Usual Suspects is the ninth solo album of Joe Lynn Turner released in Japan in 2005.

== Track listing ==
1. "Power of Love" (Cochran/Held/Turner) - 5:04
2. "Devil's Door" (Cochran/Held/Turner) - 3:29
3. "Jacknife" (Held/Lecar/Turner) - 3:23
4. "Really Loved" (Marksbury/Turner) - 4:30
5. "Rest of My Life" (Held/Lecar/Turner) - 4:38
6. "Into the Fire" (Marksbury/Turner) - 5:10
7. "Blood Money" (Cochran/Held/Turner) - 4:27
8. "All Alone" (Marksbury/Turner) - 5:01
9. "Ball and Chain" (Lecar/Turner) - 3:50
10. "Live and Love Again" (Lecar/Turner) - 5:23
11. "What Can I Do" (Turner/Byrd) - 3:48

European Pressing replaces "What Can I Do" with "Unfinished Bizness" (Markbury/Turner) - 3:40

Deluxe Pressing contains both "What Can I Do" and "Unfinished Bizness" as bonus tracks.

== Personnel ==
- Joe Lynn Turner: Lead vocals
- Al Pitrelli: Guitars on 3–5, 6, 9–11
- Karl Cochran: Guitars on 1, 2, 7, 8
- David Z: Bass
- John O'Reilly: Drums
- Paul Morris: Keyboards
- Andy Burton: Keyboards on 11
- Nancy Bender: Backing vocals

== Production ==
- Mark Wexler: Executive Producer
- Gary Tole: Engineer
