= Gezi Party =

Defunct political party in Turkey

Gezi Party Gezi Partisi
- Abbreviation: GZP
- Leader: Reşit Cem Köksal; Özcan Arslan
- Founder: Reşit Cem Köksal
- Founded: October 9, 2013
- Dissolved: October 15, 2017
- Headquarters: Ankara
- Ideology: Environmentalism; Direct democracy
- Political position: Big tent

Website
- gezipartisi.org.tr at the Wayback Machine (archived 5 August 2016)

The Gezi Party (Turkish: Gezi Partisi, GZP) was a political party in Turkey, named after Gezi Park in Istanbul, where the 2013 protests began. Founded by the heavy metal guitarist Reşit Cem Köksal, it described itself as a leaderless party above the centre whose system was to be based on direct democracy. Its founders applied to the Interior Ministry on 1 October 2013 and the party was registered on 9 October 2013, bringing the number of political parties in Turkey to 77. It did not stand in either of the 2015 general elections, held its first grand congress that September and dissolved itself in October 2017.

== History ==
=== Founding ===
The party's founder, Reşit Cem Köksal, was a 37-year-old heavy metal guitarist from Istanbul. He had shared the stage with Joe Lynn Turner on several tours since 2006. According to Köksal, the party grew out of a "Taksim Gezi Partisi" page set up by Özcan Arslan, and 17 people attended its first meeting on 30 June 2013. Köksal became its first chairman, although he said the post existed only because the law required one and that in the Gezi Party the chairman was only a spokesperson. The founders submitted a petition to establish the party to the Interior Ministry on 1 October 2013, and it was approved on 9 October. In October 2013, the number of political parties in Turkey reached 77. The party's registration was announced on the website of the Court of Cassation Chief Public Prosecutor's Office, which listed the party's headquarters in the Çankaya district of Ankara.

The party's logo showed a tree with a human figure forming its trunk.

According to its founders, the party's main aim was to help write a more democratic constitution, which they saw as requiring seats in parliament. In October 2013, Agence France-Presse reported that the party planned to field its first candidates in the 2015 general election.

=== Organization and ideology ===
The party described itself as merkez üstü ("above the centre"), a party that brought left, right and centre together. Its founding declaration said the party had no leader and was run by its Party Assembly. According to the declaration, the chairman's role was limited to carrying out the assembly's decisions and speaking for the party, and direct democracy was to be the basis of its system.

In late 2013 Köksal toured the provinces to set up local organisations. At a press conference in Safranbolu on 1 December he described the Gezi Party as a leaderless, horizontal and democratic party whose representatives acted as spokespeople, and said it would not engage in polemics with other parties. By the end of the month he said it had organisations in twelve provinces.

In his 2017 doctoral thesis at the European University Institute, Jonas Bergan Draege described a programme that treated differences of gender, religion and language as strengths, supported the right to form and join trade unions, and advocated the protection of biodiversity and animal rights. He characterised these elements as pluralist, economically left-wing and green, but noted that the programme otherwise did not explicitly address the left–right, nationalist–pluralist or Islamist–secularist divides in Turkish politics. He compared the party to single-issue parties in Western Europe, such as green and pirate parties, identifying its central issue as deliberative and participatory democracy.

Draege quoted Simay Ulgun as describing local meetings held several times a month in different parts of the city, where issues were discussed until a common decision was reached, followed by discussion and a vote between the city's regions. He identified Ulgun as a founding member and quoted her as saying there was no direct link between the party and the groups that had been most active in the protests.

=== Later years and closure ===
In February 2015 the Supreme Election Council named the 31 parties eligible to take part in the June 2015 general election; the Gezi Party was not among them, and it did not stand in either of the general elections held that year. The party said it held its first grand congress in Ankara on 20 September 2015 to avoid the sanctions faced by parties that do not hold one within two years of their founding. According to the party's account, it first established its Istanbul provincial organisation, then held a district congress in Kadıköy and a provincial congress in Istanbul. The congress had been announced on 17 September, with the election of the chairman, the Party Assembly and the Central Disciplinary Board on its agenda. By July 2016 the party's website listed Özcan Arslan as chairman. In July 2016 the party said it had stopped posting on social media and had closed all its branches and offices except its Kadıköy district organization, citing high rents.

The party dissolved itself by a decision of its ordinary congress on 15 October 2017. The list of active political parties kept by the Court of Cassation Chief Public Prosecutor's Office, updated on 19 October 2017, no longer included it. Party officials said they had started the closure process and would explain the reasons later. In a closing announcement on its website, the party said it was shutting down because Turkey's Law on Political Parties allowed politics only with financial backing. It also referred to unresolved ideological differences, saying that "we" were not yet ready. It also said that differences of religion, language, race and gender remained grounds for discrimination and that society was still looking for a strong leader. Finally, it said it had been unable to make its call to protect the natural environment heard.

In a decision of October 2019, published that December, the Constitutional Court, which audits the accounts of political parties, ruled on the party's 2015 accounts. It found that 10,761.31 lira of income and 10,605.66 lira of spending shown for the party headquarters had not been documented, and ordered party assets worth 21,366.97 lira to be forfeited to the Treasury. Because the headquarters had not sent its income and expense documents and account books, the court also decided to file a criminal complaint with the Ankara Chief Public Prosecutor's Office against the party officials responsible.

== Reception ==
In Der Freitag, Christopher Piltz set Köksal's move into politics alongside those of Beppe Grillo, Arnold Schwarzenegger and Vitali Klitschko, and noted that many in the Gezi movement feared a new party would split the opposition. Writing for Reset DOC, Francesca Gnetti saw the party's creation as proof that dissent persisted in Turkish society despite the apparent calm in Taksim Square and the government's democratic reform package. Le Petit Journal wrote at the launch that the party's platform was still unclear, and reported criticism that its logo showed a man's silhouette rather than a symbol such as the "woman in red".

Draege concluded that the attempt to build a Gezi party "was met with a lukewarm response and simply fizzled out", and argued that Turkey's 10 percent electoral threshold discouraged new parties from emerging out of the protest movement. In interviews with protest participants published in 2015, Emre Erdoğan found that none of them had expected a party to emerge from the protests, and that some thought such politicization would harm the movement's values.
