= Second Hand Life =

Studio album by Joe Lynn Turner
- Released: April 20, 2007
- Genre: Hard rock
- Length: 50:00
- Label: Frontiers Records
- Producers: Joe Lynn Turner, Bob Held

Joe Lynn Turner chronology
| Fire Without Flame (2005) | Second Hand Life (2007) | Live in Germany (2008) |

Second Hand Life is the tenth solo studio album by Joe Lynn Turner. The album features songs written by artists like Jim Peterik and Martin Briley.

== Track listing ==
1. "Your Love Is Life" (Joe Lynn Turner, Tor Talle, Deanna Johnston) – 4:39
2. "Got Me Where You Want Me" (Martin Briley) – 3:19
3. "Second Hand Life" (Turner, Jim Peterik) – 4:34
4. "In Your Eyes" (Turner, Karl Cochran, Jaime Kyle) – 4:55
5. "Blood Red Sky" (Turner, Cochran, Bob Held) – 5:57
6. "Stroke of Midnight" (Ritchie Blackmore, Turner, Peterik, Roger Glover) – 4:48
7. "Over the Top" (Turner, Cochran, Steve Johnstad) – 4:25
8. "Cruel" (Turner) – 3:48
9. "Sweet Obsession" (Turner, Jack Ponti) – 3:45
10. "Love Is on Our Side" (Turner, Aleks de Carvalho) – 4:46
11. "Two Lights" (bonus track) (Turner, Aleks de Carvalho) - 5:04
- The song "Stroke of Midnight" comes from an original version of "One Man's Meat" in The Battle Rages On... sessions with Deep Purple.

Friday Music released Second Hand Life - The Deluxe Edition on August 28, 2007.

1. "Your Love Is Life" (Joe Lynn Turner, Tor Talle, Deanna Johnston) – 4:39
2. "Got Me Where You Want Me" (Martin Briley) – 3:19
3. "Second Hand Life" (Turner, Jim Peterik) – 4:34
4. "In Your Eyes" (Turner, Karl Cochran, Jaime Kyle) – 4:55
5. "Blood Red Sky" (Turner, Cochran, Bob Held) – 5:57
6. "Stroke of Midnight" (Ritchie Blackmore, Turner, Peterik, Roger Glover) – 4:48
7. "Off The Hook" (Turner, Cochran, Held) – 4:10 (Bonus Track)
8. "Over the Top" (Turner, Cochran, Steve Johnstad) – 4:25
9. "Cruel" (Turner) – 3:48
10. "Sweet Obsession" (Turner, Jack Ponti) – 3:45
11. "Love Is on Our Side" (Turner, Aleks de Carvalho) – 4:46
12. "Two Lights" (Turner, Aleks de Carvalho) - 5:04 (Bonus Track)
13. "Freedom's Wings" (Turner, Cross, Regan) – 4:41 (Bonus Track)

== Personnel ==
- Joe Lynn Turner: Vocals
- Karl Cochran: Guitars, Bass on tracks 1, 4, 5, 7, 9–11
- Bob Held - bass on tracks 2, 3, 6, 8
- Michael Cartellone - drums
- Gary Corbett - keyboards

== Production ==
- Executive Producer – Mark Wexler
- Mixing – Gary Tole
- Engineer – Gary Tole
