= Sunstorm (Sunstorm album) =

Studio album by Sunstorm
- Released: September 22, 2006
- Genre: Pop rock, arena rock, hard rock, AOR
- Length: 52:53
- Label: Frontiers
- Producer: Dennis Ward

Sunstorm chronology
Sunstorm (2006)	House of Dreams (2009)

Sunstorm is the self-titled album by the AOR side project of former Rainbow vocalist Joe Lynn Turner.

== Track listing ==
1. "Keep Tonight" - 4:03 (Joe Lynn Turner, Jack Ponti)
2. "Fame and Fortune" - 4:01 (Turner, Laurence Alan Dvoskin)
3. "Heart over Mind" - 4:13 (Van Stephenson, Dave Robbins)
4. "This Is My Heart" - 3:56 (Jim Peterik)
5. "Strength Over Time" - 4:31 (Peterik)
6. "Another You" - 4:56 (Peterik, Dick Eastman)
7. "Fist Full of Heat" - 4:37 (G. Green, Dann Huff, Stephenson)
8. "Love's Gone Wrong" - 3:52 (Turner, Dvoskin)
9. "Night Moves" - 5:07 (John Astley, Marilyn Martin)
10. "Danger of Love" - 5:07 (Peterik)
11. "Making Up for Lost Time" - 4:21 (Peterik, Bill Syniar, Bill Unger)
12. "Arms of Love" - 4:09 (Peterik, David Carl)
13. "Another You (Remix)" - 4:57 (Peterik, Dick Eastman) {Japanese edition bonus track}

== Personnel ==
Sunstorm

- Joe Lynn Turner - lead vocals
- Dennis Ward - bass, backing vocals, additional guitars, keyboards
- Uwe Reitenauer - rhythm and lead guitar
- Chris Schmidt - drums
- Jochen Weyer - keyboards

Production

- Dennis Ward - producer, engineer, mixing
- Serafino Perugino - executive producer
