= Slam (Joe Lynn Turner album) =

Studio album by Joe Lynn Turner
- Released: October 8, 2001
- Genre: Rock
- Length: 53:50
- Label: MTM
- Producers: Bob Held & Joe Lynn Turner

Joe Lynn Turner chronology
Holy Man (2000)	Slam (2001)	JLT (2003)

Slam is the 7th solo album of Joe Lynn Turner released in 2001. In 2006, the album was reissued with a bonus track 'Challenge Them All' which replaced the track 'Cover Up'.

== Track listing ==
1. "Bloodsucker" (Held/Kajiyama/Turner) - 4:17
2. "Eye for an Eye" (Held/Kajiyama/Turner) - 5:17
3. "Deliver Me" (Kajiyama/Turner) - 3:38
4. "Heart of the Night" (Kajiyama/Turner) - 5:03
5. "Slam" (Held/Kajiyama/Turner) - 5:22
6. "Dark Days" (Kajiyama/Turner) - 3:58
7. "Possession" (Kajiyama/Turner) - 4:50
8. "Show Yourself" (Kajiyama/Turner) - 4:52
9. "Cover Up" (Held/Kajiyama/Turner) - 3:40
10. "Hard Time" (Kajiyama/Turner) - 3:58
11. "Evil" (Held/Kajiyama/Turner) - 4:26
12. "Always Tomorrow" (Kajiyama/Turner) - 4:29
13. "Challenge Them All" *
- *Bonus track on the 2006 reissue. it replaces 'Cover Up'

== Personnel ==
- Joe Lynn Turner: Lead vocals
- Akira Kajiyama: Guitars
- Eric Czar: Bass
- Kenny Kramme: Drums
- Paul Morris: Keyboards
