= Rescue You =

Studio album by Joe Lynn Turner
- Released: October 14, 1985
- Genre: Rock
- Length: 40:44
- Label: Elektra
- Producer: Roy Thomas Baker

Joe Lynn Turner chronology
Rescue You (1985)	Nothing's Changed (1995)

Professional ratings
Review scores
Source	Rating
Allmusic	2.5/5 stars
Kerrang!	4/5 stars

Rescue You is the first solo album of Joe Lynn Turner, formerly of Rainbow and Fandango. It was produced by Roy Thomas Baker.

There was a single and video release of the song, "Endlessly." The song received extensive airplay on radio and peaked at No. 19 on Billboard’s Mainstream Rock chart. The accompanying video was directed by Jim Yukich, whose credits included Iron Maiden, Genesis, Jeff Beck, and David Bowie. The director described the video “like a dream in the life," combining conceptual and performance footage, and revolves around the marketing of a rock star." It was filmed at Carthay Studios and the Electrasound Warehouse near Los Angeles. Tammara Wells produced. The album debuted on the Billboard 200 Album chart, the week ending November 2, 1985, and was on the charts for a total of 12 weeks, peaking at No. 143.

== Track listing ==
Songs written by Greenwood/Turner except noted

1. "Losing You" - 4:25
2. "Young Hearts" - 3:52
3. "Prelude" (Newman, Turner) - 0:56
4. "Endlessly" - 3:40
5. "Rescue You" - 4:31
6. "Feel the Fire" - 3:28
7. "Get Tough" (Delia, Turner) - 4:33
8. "Eyes of Love" (Turner) - 3:49
9. "On the Run" - 3:53
10. "Soul Searcher" (Greenwood, Newman, Turner) - 4:08
11. "The Race Is On" - 3:23

== Personnel ==
- Joe Lynn Turner – vocals
- Alan Greenwood – keyboards
- Chuck Burgi – drums
- Bobby Messano – guitar, bass guitar, backing vocals

== Chart performance ==
Year	Chart	Position
1985	U.S. Billboard 200	143

Year	Single	Chart	Position
1985	"Endlessly"	U.S. Billboard Mainstream Rock	19
