= B'z Live-Gym 2006: Monster's Garage =

B'z Live-Gym 2006 "Monster's Garage"

Video by B'z
- Released: December 20, 2006
- Genres: Blues-rock; Hard rock
- Length: 2:45:00
- Label: B-Vision
- Producer: Tak Matsumoto

B'z chronology
Typhoon No.15 ~B'z Live-Gym The Final Pleasure "It's Showtime!!" in Nagisaen~ (2004)	B'z Live-Gym 2006 "Monster's Garage" (2006)	B'z Live in Nanba (2008)

B'z Live-Gym 2006 "Monster's Garage" is the sixth live VHS/DVD released by Japanese rock duo B'z. It features live footage of the Monster Live-Gym 2006, one of their famous Live Gyms. On December 22, 2010, the first two discs were re-released in Blu-ray. The Blu-ray release also contain the documentary disc but still in DVD.

== Track listing ==
=== Disc One ===
1. All-Out-Attack
2. Juice
3. Piero (ピエロ) (Pierrot)
4. Netemosametemo (ネテモサメテモ)
5. Yuruginai Mono Hitotsu (ゆるぎないものひとつ)
6. Koi no Sama-Sesshon (恋のサマーセッション) (Koi no Summer Session)
7. Mvp
8. Bad Communication
9. Ultra Soul
10. Tak's Solo ~ #Amadare Buru-zu (Tak's Solo ~ #雨だれぶるーず)
11. Happy Birthday
12. Brotherhood
13. Blowin'
14. Ocean

=== Disc Two ===
1. Monster
2. Shodou (衝動)
3. Ai no Bakudan (愛のバクダン)
4. Love Phantom
5. Splash!
6. Ashita Mata Hi ga Noboru Nara (明日また陽が昇るなら)
7. Giri Giri Chop (ギリギリ Chop)
8. Run

=== Disc Three ===
「Off Limits ~How Two Men Created a Monster~」

== Certifications ==
Region	Certification	Certified units/sales
Japan (RIAJ)	Gold	100,000^{^}
^{^} Shipments figures based on certification alone.
