= B'z Live in Nanba =

Video by B'z
- Released: February 20, 2008
- Genre: Hard rock
- Length: 1:21:00
- Label: B-Vision
- Producer: Tak Matsumoto

B'z chronology
B'z Live-Gym 2006 "Monster's Garage" (2006)	B'z Live in Nanba (2008)	B'z Live-Gym Hidden Pleasure 〜Typhoon No.20〜 (2008)

B'z Live in Nanba is the seventh live VHS/DVD released by Japanese rock duo B'z, on February 20, 2008. It features live footage of their show at Namba, Osaka.

== Track listing ==
1. ALL-OUT ATTACK
2. juice
3. piero (pierrot) (ピエロ)
4. Netemosametemo (ネテモサメテモ)
5. yuruginaimono hitotsu (ゆるぎないものひとつ)
6. Real Thing Shakes
7. DEVIL
8. Brighter Day
9. TAK'S SOLO
10. Amadare Buru-zu (Amadare Blues) (雨だれぶるーず)
11. HOME
12. MONSTER
13. Shōdō (衝動)
14. Ai no Bakudan (愛のバクダン)
15. LOVE PHANTOM
16. Giri Giri Chop (ギリギリChop)
17. SPLASH!
18. RUN

== Certifications ==
Region	Certification	Certified units/sales
Japan (RIAJ)	Gold	100,000^{^}
^{^} Shipments figures based on certification alone.
