= HTP (album) =

Studio album by Hughes Turner Project
- Released: 6 February 2002
- Recorded: October 2001
- Genre: Hard rock, funk
- Length: 61:12 (European version); 65:48 (Japanese version)
- Label: MTM Music (Europe); Pony Canyon (Japan)
- Producer: Glenn Hughes; Joe Lynn Turner; Mike Scott

Hughes Turner Project chronology
HTP (2002)	Live In Tokyo (2002)

Professional ratings
Review scores
Source	Rating
Allmusic	link
MelodicRock	91% link

HTP is the debut album by Hughes Turner Project, a musical collaborators Glenn Hughes (Deep Purple / Black Sabbath, etc.) and Joe Lynn Turner (Rainbow / Yngwie Malmsteen's Rising Force, etc.); it was released on 6 February 2002 on MTM Music and Pony Canyon Records.

== History ==
After a failed attempt in the late 80s to write an album together, Glenn Hughes and Joe Lynn Turner again joined forces in 2001 and started writing and recording an album. The album was released in February 2002 and focuses on the hard rock that both musicians are known for as well as a more AOR sound that is indicative of Turner's output and funk leanings, in a similar vein to Hughes’ solo albums.

Hughes’ regular guitarist JJ Marsh plays on the album and co-wrote the majority of the tracks. The album also features performances from drummer Shane Gaalaas and keyboardist Vince DiCola. Guest guitarists include former Whitesnake and Thin Lizzy man John Sykes, Mr Big and former Racer X member Paul Gilbert and Japanese player Akira Kajiyama.

Both Hughes and Turner have solo vocal showcases; Turner sings alone on the track Mystery of the Heart, while Hughes' takes centre stage on Heaven's Missing An Angel (which features John Sykes).

The Japanese version of the album includes the song Against The Wall.

A live album, entitled Live In Tokyo was recorded during the subsequent tour and was released later in 2002.

== Track listing ==
1. "Devil's Road" – 5:45 (Hughes, Marsh, Turner)
2. "You Can't Stop Rock & Roll" – 4:45 (Hughes, Marsh, Turner)
3. "Missed Your Name" – 5:09 (Hughes, Marsh, Turner)
4. "Mystery of the Heart" – 5:57 (Hughes, Turner)
5. "Sister Midnight" – 5:03 (Hughes, Marsh, Turner)
6. "Better Man" – 5:28 (Hughes)
7. "Heaven's Missing an Angel" – 7:11 (Hughes, Marsh, Sykes)
8. "Fade Away" – 6:55 (Hughes, Marsh, Turner)
9. "Ride the Storm" – 3:53 (Hughes, Marsh, Turner)
10. "Run Run Run" – 3:54 (Hughes, Marsh, Turner)
11. "On the Ledge" – 7:12 (Hughes, DiCola, Turner)

=== Japan bonus track ===
1. "Against the Wall" – 4:36 (Hughes, Marsh, Turner)

== Personnel ==
- Glenn Hughes – vocals, bass
- Joe Lynn Turner – vocals
- JJ Marsh – guitars
- Shane Gaalaas – drums
- Vince DiCola – keyboards
- Paul Gilbert – guitar solo (track: 2)
- John Sykes – guitars, backing vocals (tracks: 7)
- Akira Kajiyama – guitar (tracks: 9, 12)
