= Emotional Fire =

Studio album by Sunstorm
- Released: February 28, 2012
- Genre: Pop rock, arena rock
- Label: Frontiers
- Producer: Dennis Ward, Serafino Perugino

Sunstorm chronology
House of Dreams (2009)	Emotional Fire (2012)	Edge of Tomorrow (2016)

Emotional Fire is the third album from Sunstorm, an AOR project formed by former Rainbow singer Joe Lynn Turner and featuring members of German rock band Pink Cream 69. On Emotional Fire, Turner pays tribute to his 1980s sessions as a backing vocalist for the likes of Michael Bolton and Cher. The album was released on February 28, 2012, by Frontiers Records.

== Track list ==
1. Never Give Up (3:44) (Robert Säll, Sören Kronqvist)
2. Emotional Fire (3:52) (Michael Bolton, Diane Warren, Desmond Child)
3. Lay Down Your Arms (3:47) (Johan Stentorp)
4. You Wouldn't Know Love (3:51) (Michael Bolton, Diane Warren)
5. Wish You Were Here (3:35) (Daniel Palmqvist)
6. Torn In Half (3:51) (Sören Kronqvist)
7. Gina (4:00) (Michael Bolton, Keith Diamond, Bob Halligan Jr.)
8. The Higher You Raise (3:59) (Robert Säll, Daniel Palmqvist, Sören Kronqvist)
9. Emily (3:45) (Sören Kronqvist)
10. Follow Your Heart (4:03) (Sören Kronqvist)
11. All I Am (4:00) (James Martin, Mikey Wilson, Tom Martin, Isabell Oversveen)
12. The Silence (Japanese Edition Bonus Track)

== Personnel ==
- Joe Lynn Turner - vocals
- Dennis Ward - guitars, bass, backing vocals
- Uwe Reitenauer - guitars
- Chris Schmidt - drums
- Justin Dakey - keyboards

== Production notes ==
- Produced and mixed by Dennis Ward at CrakShak
- Executive producer: Serafino Perugino
- Mastered by Dennis Ward
- Vocals produced by Tom Merlynn and Joe Lynn Turner
- Vocals recorded by Tom Merlynn at TKL Studios
- Vocals executive producer: Mark Wexler
