= JLT (album) =

Studio album by Joe Lynn Turner
- Released: November 4, 2003
- Genre: Hard rock
- Length: 54:54 (50:41)
- Labels: Pony Canyon Records; PCCY-01651
- Producers: Joe Lynn Turner, Bob Held

Joe Lynn Turner chronology
Slam (2001)	JLT (2003)	The Usual Suspects (2005)

JLT is the eighth solo studio album by Joe Lynn Turner.

== Track listing ==
1. "In Cold Blood" – 4:18 (Joe Lynn Turner)
2. "Jump Start" – 3:29 (Turner/Bob Held/Chris Marksbury)
3. "Dirty Deal" – 4:09 (Turner/Marksbury)
4. "Love Don't Live Here" – 5:35 (Turner/Held/Al Pitrelli)
5. "Excess" – 5:30 (Turner/Marksbury)
6. "Let's Go" – 3:22 (Turner/Marksbury)
7. "Cryin' Out Loud" – 5:48 (Turner/Held/Pitrelli)
8. "Lie" – 4:13 (Turner/Held/Marksbury)
9. "Fantasize" – 4:46 (Turner/Marksbury)
10. "Blood Fire" – 4:53 (Turner)
11. "Drivin' With My Eyes Closed" – 3:25 (Turner/Held)
12. "Hit the Switch" – 3:47 (Turner/Held)
13. "Reprise" (Instrumental) – 1:39 (Turner)
- MTM version (MTM Records 0681–74) omits track 8

== Personnel ==
- Joe Lynn Turner: Vocals
- Al Pitrelli: Guitars (Tracks 1–11)
- Greg Smith: Bass (Tracks 1, 2, 5–7 & 11)
- Eric Czar: Bass (Tracks 3, 4, 8, 12 & 13)
- John O'Reilly: Drums

Guest Musicians

- Chris Caffery: Guitars (Track 1)
- Joe Bonamassa: Guitars (Tracks 2, 3 & 5)
- Karl Cochran: Guitars (Tracks 12 & 13)
- Chris Marksbury: Guitars (Track 6), Backing vocals (Tracks 6 & 8)
- John Bongiovanni: Bass guitar (Track 9)
- Bob Held: Bass (Track 10) and Backing vocals (Track 6)
- Carmine Giglo: Keyboards (Tracks 1 & 7)
- Lloyd Landsman: Keyboards (Track 3)
- Jane Mangini: Keyboards (Tracks 4 & 10)
- Paul Morris: Keyboards (Track 11)
- Preston Nichols: Cowbell(Track 6)

Backing Vocals

- Max Velez: Backing vocals (Track 6)
- Mark Wexler: Backing vocals (Track 6)
- Sheryl Wilson: Backing vocals (Track 12)
- Ricky Taranto: Backing vocals (Track 12)
- Tony Bruno: Backing vocals (Track 12)
- Kyle Salvador: Backing vocals (Track 12)
- Matthew Lane: Backing vocals (Track 12)

== Production ==
- Executive Producer – Mark Wexler
- Mixing – Gary Tole
- Engineer – Gary Tole and Max Velez
