= Sunstorm (band) =

American rock band

- Origin: United States
- Genres: Hard rock
- Years active: 1999–present
- Label: Frontiers
- Members: Ronnie Romero; Aldo Lonobile; Antonio Agate; Andrea Arcangeli; Alfonso Mocerino
- Past members: Dennis Ward; Uwe Reitenauer; Jochen Weyer; Gunther Werno; Justin Dakey; Chris Schmidt; Francesco Jovino; Joe Lynn Turner; Edo Sala; Simone Mularoni; Luca Princiotta; Alessandro Del Vecchio; Nik Mazzucconi; Michele Sanna

Sunstorm is an American hard rock musical project, originally featuring lead vocalist Joe Lynn Turner (formerly of Rainbow), bassist/vocalist Dennis Ward, keyboardist Jochen Weyer, as well as guitarist Uwe Reitenauer and drummer Chris Schmidt, both members of the band Pink Cream 69. The albums also featured artists such as Dann Huff and Jim Peterik as additional songwriters. The first album called Sunstorm was released in 2006, followed in 2009 by their second album House of Dreams. Emotional Fire is the third release, out in 2012.

In 2016, it was announced that Joe Lynn Turner would record a new Sunstorm album, this time following a heavier sound, similar to another project of his called Rated X, but keeping the melodic side trademark of the project. For the album Edge of Tomorrow a new lineup was also announced with Alessandro Del Vecchio (Hardline, Jorn, Edge of Forever, Silent Force, ex-Voodoo Circle) on keyboards, Hammond organ, backing vocals and handling songwriting and production of the album. Other musicians were Simone Mularoni (DGM) on guitars, Nik Mazzucconi Labyrinth) on bass and Francesco Jovino (ex-Primal Fear, ex-Hardline, Voodoo Circle, Jorn) on drums. It was released on May 13, 2016.

In 2018, the singles "Only The Good Will Survive" (released April 16) and "The Road to Hell" (released May 16) anticipated the new album The Road to Hell, released on June 8 again produced by Alessandro Del Vecchio via Frontiers. In this album drummer Edo Sala (Folkestone) replaced Francesco Jovino.

In December 2020, Frontiers Music announced Sunstorm new album called Afterlife that would be released on March 12, 2021. It was anticipated by single "Swan Song" on January 15, 2021. The new Sunstorm band is formed by Ronnie Romero (Lords of Black, Rainbow, The Ferrymen, ex-CoreLeoni) and Italian drummer Michele Sanna, respectively in place of Joe Lynn Turner and Edo Sala.

On May 1, 2022, the photo of the preparation of a new video was published on the Facebook page of Frontiers and the band. On the 17th of the same month, the band and Frontiers published other photos in which Luca Princiotta can be seen replacing Simone Mularoni on guitar. On June 6, 2022, the band released the cover and title of their new album Brothers in Arms and a photo of the new lineup. The title track is released on June 9 and is announced on August 5 as the release date of the disc.

Hot on the heels of their 'Brothers in Arms' studio album released in August 2022, Sunstorm announced that a special live digital release entitled 'Still Roaring: The Studio Session' would be issued on October 21 in both audio and as a full-length video. Recorded when the group assembled to film promo clips for songs from their new studio record, they made full use of the time together to record this live studio session, which sees the quintet performing songs from across their catalogue.

== Band members ==
Current

- Ronnie Romero – lead vocals (2020–present)
- Antonio Agate – keyboards, backing vocals (2023–present)
- Aldo Lonobile – guitar (2023–present)
- Andrea Arcangeli – bass guitar (2023–present)
- Alfonso Mocerino – drums (2023–present)

Past

- Joe Lynn Turner – vocals (2006–2020)
- Dennis Ward – bass guitar, guitar, backing vocals (2006–2012)
- Uwe Reitenauer – guitar (2006–2012)
- Jochen Weyer – keyboards (2006)
- Gunther Werno – keyboards (2009)
- Justin Dakey – keyboards (2012)
- Chris Schmidt – drums (2006–2012)
- Francesco Jovino – drums (2016)
- Edo Sala – drums (2017–2018)
- Simone Mularoni – guitar (2016–2021)
- Alessandro Del Vecchio – keyboards, hammond organ, backing vocals (2016–2023)
- Luca Princiotta – guitar (2022–2023)
- Nik Mazzucconi – bass guitar (2016–2023)
- Michele Sanna – drums (2020–2023)

=== Recording timeline ===
Role	Album							
Role	Sunstorm (2006)	House of Dreams (2009)	Emotional Fire (2012)	Edge of Tomorrow (2016)	The Road to Hell (2018)	Afterlife (2021)	Brothers in Arms (2022)	Restless Fight (2024)
Lead vocals	Joe Lynn Turner	Joe Lynn Turner	Joe Lynn Turner	Joe Lynn Turner	Joe Lynn Turner	Ronnie Romero	Ronnie Romero	Ronnie Romero
Guitars	Uwe Reitenauer, Dennis Ward	Uwe Reitenauer, Dennis Ward	Uwe Reitenauer, Dennis Ward	Simone Mularoni	Simone Mularoni	Simone Mularoni	Luca Princiotta	Aldo Lonobile
Bass	Dennis Ward	Dennis Ward	Dennis Ward	Nik Mazzucconi	Nik Mazzucconi	Nik Mazzucconi	Nik Mazzucconi	Andrea Arcangeli
Keyboards	Jochen Weyer	Gunther Werno	Justin Dakey	Alessandro Del Vecchio	Alessandro Del Vecchio	Alessandro Del Vecchio	Alessandro Del Vecchio	Antonio Agate
Drums	Chris Schmidt	Chris Schmidt	Chris Schmidt	Francesco Jovino	Edo Sala	Michele Sanna	Michele Sanna	Alfonso Mocerino

== Discography ==
- Sunstorm (2006)
- House of Dreams (2009)
- Emotional Fire (2012)
- Edge of Tomorrow (2016)
- The Road to Hell (2018)
- Afterlife (2021)
- Brothers in Arms (2022)
- Still Roaring: The Studio Session (live, 2022)
- Restless Fight (2024)
