= Fandango (American band) =

American pop rock band

- Origin: United States
- Genres: Pop rock, hard rock, southern rock
- Labels: Wounded Bird Records, RCA Records
- Past members: Joe Lynn Turner; Rick Blakemore; Abe Speller; Bob Danyls; Larry Dawson; Denny LaRue; Santos; Lou Mondelli; Joe De Lia; Ron Zampini

Fandango was an American pop rock band which began as a four-piece, playing in the local clubs in the Tri-state area: New Jersey, New York, Connecticut (circa 1976) before adding three more members prior to their first recording contract being signed in March 1977. It was fronted by vocalist Joe Lynn Turner (who by then had already changed his given name 'Linquito' through a suggestion by guitarist Rick Blakemore). Larry Dawson (stage name of Larry Dvoskin), one of the band's keyboardists, would later play for Uli Jon Roth.

The band opened for acts like The Allman Brothers, The Marshall Tucker Band, Wet Willie, Billy Joel, and Chicago. Phil Walden's Paragon Agency (who initially represented such artists as Otis Redding, Percy Sledge, and Sam & Dave in the early 1960s) were responsible for booking Fandango. Turner has stated that the band took influences from the Eagles and southern rock. The group, after the release of their fourth album (Cadillac), disbanded shortly after their equipment was stolen at Chicago Fest. Turner's work with the band got him noticed by Barry Ambrosio (who was Ritchie Blackmore's personal assistant). He put Blackmore on the phone and asked Turner to audition for Rainbow.

== Discography ==
=== Fandango (1977) ===
==== Track listing ====
Side one

1. "Headliner" – (Denny LaRue, Rick Blakemore) – 3:40
2. "Down Down Down" – (LaRue, Blakemore) – 4:41
3. "Jesse And Will" – (Blakemore) – 4:49
4. "San Joaquin" – (LaRue, Blakemore) – 4:02
5. "Life Of The Party" – (music: Joe Delia / lyrics: LaRue, Joe Delia, Joe Lynn Turner) – 4:43

Side two

6. "Shadow Boxing" - (LaRue, Blakemore) - 3:01
7. "Helpless Heart" – (Carole Meyers, LaRue, Blakemore) – 4:07
8. "Devil Rain" – (LaRue, Blakemore) – 6:08
9. "Misery Road" – (LaRue, Blakemore) – 4:15
10. "Goin' Down For The Last Time" – (LaRue, Turner) – 4:11

==== Personnel ====
- Joe Lynn Turner – lead vocals, guitar
- Rick Blakemore – guitar, backing vocals
- Denny LaRue – keyboards, backing vocals
- Bob Danyls – bass (1, 3-5, 8, 9), backing vocals

Additional personnel

- David Campbell – string arrangements (3, 5, 7)
- Candy Kurgen – backing vocals (6)
- David Sanborn – saxophone (5)
- John Tropea – guitar (7, 10)
- Joe Delia – piano, clavinet, synthesizer, organ, string arrangements (10)
- Don Payne – bass (2, 6, 7, 10)
- Abe Speller – drums (all but 4)
- Lou Mondinelli – drums (4), tambourine (2, 7), handclaps (7)
- Walter Santos – congas (2, 6)
- Lou Mondelli – marimba (9), congas (9), timbales (9)

=== Last Kiss (1978) ===
==== Track listing ====
Side one

1. "Last Kiss" – (Bob Danyls, Dennis La Rue, Joe Lynn Turner, Larry Dawson, Richard Mason Blakemore) – 4:04
2. "Sure Got The Power" – (La Rue, Blakemore) – 4:17
3. "Mexico" – (La Rue, Turner, Blakemore) – 5:52
4. "Losin' Kind Of Love" – (Turner) – 3:38
5. "Hotel LaRue" – (La Rue, Blakemore) – 5:16

Side two

6. "Feel The Pain" - (La Rue, Turner, Blakemore) - 5:12
7. "CIty Of Angels" – (La Rue, Blakemore) – 7:09
8. "The Mill's On Fire" – (La Rue, Blakemore) – 5:49
9. "I Keep Going/Hard Bargain" – (La Rue) – 5:36

==== Personnel ====
- Joe Lynn Turner – lead vocals (all but 9), lead guitar
- Rick Blakemore – lead and slide guitars, backing and lead (9b) vocals
- Dennis LaRue – organ, backing vocals, piano
- Larry Dawson – piano, clavinet, organ, synthesizer
- Bob Danyls – bass, backing and lead (9a) vocals
- Lou Mondelli – drums, backing vocals
- Walter Santos – percussion
- Jimmy Hall – backing vocals (2), harmonica (4)

=== One Night Stand (1979) ===
==== Track listing ====
Side one

1. "One Night Stand" – (Dennis La Rue) – 2:40
2. "Thief In The Night" – (La Rue, Joe Lynn Turner, Rick Blakemore) – 3:48
3. "Hard Man (Bless My Soul)" – (Bob Danyls, La Rue, Turner, Blakemore) – 3:56
4. "Hard Headed Woman" – (La Rue, Blakemore) – 3:28
5. "I Would Never Leave" – (La Rue, Turner, Larry Dawson, Blakemore) – 5:21

Side two

6. "Dancer" - (La Rue, Turner, Blakemore) - 3:33
7. "Little Cherie" – (La Rue, Blakemore) – 4:05
8. "Late Nights" – (La Rue) – 3:15
9. "Two Time Loser" – (Turner, Blakemore) – 4:29
10. "Ain't No Way" – (Danyls, Turner, Dawson, Blakemore) – 3:48

==== Personnel ====
- Joe Lynn Turner – lead (1, 2, 5-8) and co-lead (4, 9) vocals, guitar
- Rick Blakemore – guitar, backing, lead (3) and co-lead (4, 9) vocals
- Dennis LaRue – keyboards, backing vocals
- Larry Dawson – keyboards
- Bob Danyls – bass, backing and lead (10) vocals
- Lou Mondelli – drums
- Walter Santos – percussion

=== Cadillac (1980) ===
Cadliac was Fandango's final album before Joe Lynn Turner joined Rainbow in the fall of 1980. Released on RCA Records. Re-Released on CD in 2008 on Wounded Bird Records in the United States and in 2010 on Canyon in the United Kingdom.

==== Track listing ====
===== Side One =====
1. "Blame it On The Night" – (Rick Blakemore/Dannie LaRue) – 3:42
2. "Rock 'n' Roll You" - (LaRue/Joe Lynn Turner) - 5:44
3. "Hypnotized" - (Blakemore/LaRue/Bob Danyls/Turner) - 2:32
4. "Don't Waste My Time" - (Danyls/Turner) - 3:06
5. "Stranger (in a Strange Land)" - (LaRue/Blakemore) - 4:10

===== Side Two =====
6. "Cadliac" – (LaRue/Turner) – 3:10
7. "Fortune Teller" - (LaRue/Blakemore/Turner) - 4:10
8. "Getaway" - (Danyls/Turner) - 3:52
9. "Headliner" (1980 version) - (LaRue/Blakemore) 4:42

Personnel

- Arranged By [Arrangements & Musical Direction] – Denny LaRue
- Artwork By [Art Direction & Design] – Pat McGowan
- Bass, Vocals – Bob Danyls
- Drums – Abe Speller
- Engineer – Jack Malken, Michael Barry
- Engineer [Assistant] – Ed Sullivan (3)
- Guitar, Vocals – Rick Blakemore
- Keyboards, Synthesizer, Organ – Larry Dawson
- Lead Vocals, Guitar – Joe Lynn Turner
- Mastered By – Howie Weinberg
- Percussion – Santos (11)
- Piano – Joe De Lia
- Producer – Ed Newmark, Warren Schatz
