= Joe Lynn Turner =

American singer (born 1951)

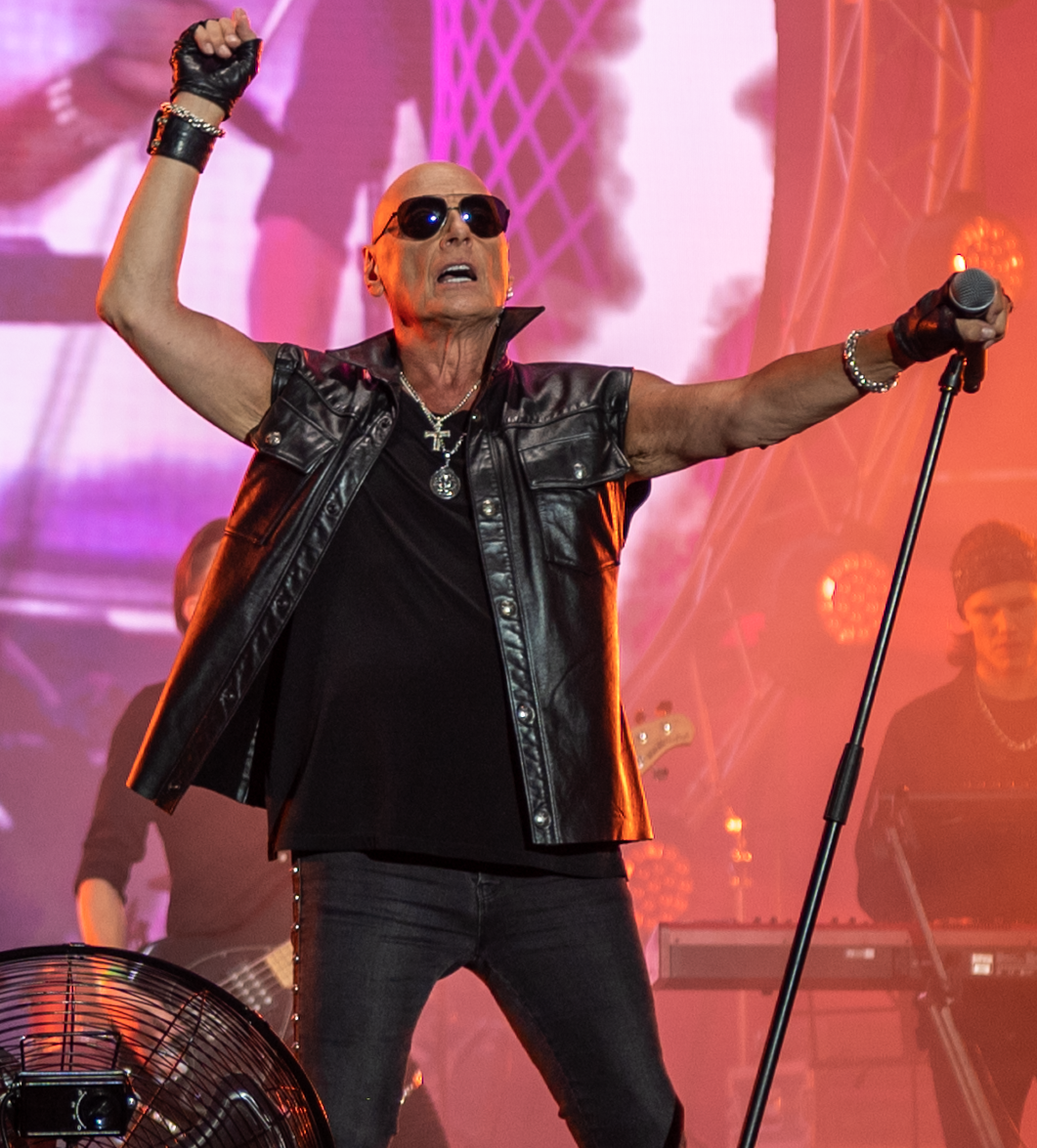
- Turner performing in Moscow in 2024

Background information
- Also known as: JLT
- Born: Joseph Arthur Mark Linquito; August 2, 1951 (age 75); Hackensack, New Jersey, U.S.
- Genres: Hard rock, pop rock, heavy metal
- Occupations: Singer, songwriter, musician
- Instruments: Vocals, guitar, accordion, piano
- Years active: 1969–present
- Labels: Elektra, Frontiers. Cleopatra
- Website: joelynnturner.com

Joe Lynn Turner (born Joseph Arthur Mark Linquito, August 2, 1951) is an American singer best known for his work with Rainbow, Deep Purple, and Yngwie Malmsteen.

Turner joined Rainbow in the early 1980s, performing on the albums Difficult to Cure (1981), Straight Between the Eyes (1982), and Bent Out of Shape (1983). Following Rainbow's disbandment, Turner collaborated with Yngwie Malmsteen on the album Odyssey (1988) and the live recording Trial by Fire: Live in Leningrad (1989). In 1989, he became a member of Deep Purple, contributing to the album Slaves and Masters (1990), accompanying the band on a world tour in 1991. Beyond his collaborations, Turner has released nine solo albums, beginning with Rescue You (1985), and most recently Belly of the Beast (2022). Additionally, he has released two albums as part of the Hughes Turner Project: HTP (2002) and HTP 2 (2003).

== Early life and career ==
=== Early work ===
Turner was born in Hackensack, New Jersey, on August 2, 1951, and became interested in music in the 1960s. Growing up in an Italian-American home, he was influenced by singers such as Frank Sinatra and Enrico Caruso. In high school, he formed the band Ezra, performing original material and cover songs. He played the accordion as a child and learned the guitar in his early teens. He was once influenced primarily by such artists as Led Zeppelin, Jimi Hendrix and Free.

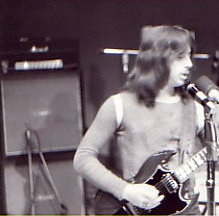
Turner playing in Ezra, c. 1972

In 1977, Turner joined the rock band Fandango, who signed with RCA Records. Turner sang and played guitar on the band's four albums. Fandango toured with numerous artists including the Allman Brothers Band, the Marshall Tucker Band, the Beach Boys and Billy Joel.

=== Rainbow ===
After Fandango split, Turner received a phone call from British guitarist Ritchie Blackmore. This led to an audition, and Turner was subsequently enlisted as the lead vocalist for Rainbow. At the time, the band had achieved considerable success in Europe and Japan but had not yet attained the same level of recognition in the United States. Turner's arrival coincided with a shift toward a more mainstream, pop-oriented sound, which contributed to Rainbow's increased success in the US market.

During this period, several of the band's tracks with Turner on vocals reached the Top 20 on rock radio charts in the early-to-mid-1980s. "Stone Cold" became Rainbow's first Top 40 hit, and the accompanying video received significant rotation on MTV, boosting the band's visibility in America. Turner appeared on three studio albums with Rainbow: Difficult to Cure, Straight Between the Eyes, and Bent Out of Shape. Songs such as "Street of Dreams" and "Can’t Let You Go" were notable singles from these albums.

The album produced Rainbow's most successful UK single, I Surrender, which peaked at No. 3 on the UK charts. It also marked significant growth for the band in the US, where "Jealous Lover" gained considerable airplay on Album-Oriented Rock radio stations and charted at No. 13 on Billboard’s Rock Tracks chart. Initially a B-side to "Can’t Happen Here", the song was later reissued as the title track for a US EP.

Rainbow's follow-up album, Straight Between the Eyes, further developed this AOR direction, solidifying the band's success in the US. However, this evolution in sound alienated some long-time fans who preferred the band's earlier material. The ballad "Stone Cold" became a major hit on Billboard’s Rock Tracks chart, reaching No. 1, and its accompanying MTV video received extensive play. The band’s successful American tour during this time was documented in the live album and video Live Between the Eyes.

The follow up, Bent Out of Shape featured the hit "Street of Dreams", which sustained the band’s AOR success. There was controversy surrounding the music video for the track, with Ritchie Blackmore claiming that MTV banned it due to its alleged hypnosis theme. However, critics such as Dr. Thomas Radecki of the National Coalition on Television Violence disputed this, accusing MTV of broadcasting a video with violent and disturbing imagery.

The band’s final tour before disbanding in 1984 included performances in the UK and Japan. A highlight was a concert in Japan where Rainbow performed Difficult to Cure with a full orchestra. This performance was filmed and later released on home video as Japan Tour ’84.

=== Debut solo album ===
In 1985, Turner released a solo album, Rescue You, produced by Roy Thomas Baker, known for his work with Queen and the Cars. He co-wrote most of the songs with keyboardist Al Greenwood (of Foreigner). The first single, "Endlessly", received extensive airplay on radio and MTV. Tours with Night Ranger and Pat Benatar and an acting role in the TV movie Blue Deville followed.

=== Yngwie Malmsteen ===
In late 1987, guitarist Yngwie Malmsteen restructured his band, replacing vocalist Mark Boals with Turner, and adding session bassist Bob Daisley. On April 8, 1988, Malmsteen released his fourth studio album, Odyssey, through Polydor Records, with Turner supplying the lyrics for nine of the twelve songs. The album reached No. 40 on the US Billboard 200, where it remained for eighteen weeks, marking Malmsteen's highest-charting release on the Billboard 200 as of 2021. Odyssey also reached the top 50 in five other countries, driven in part by the success of its lead single, Turner's "Heaven Tonight", with media praise for his vocal performances. During the Odyssey tour, Malmsteen performed in the Soviet Union, with shows recorded and released in 1989 as Trial by Fire: Live in Leningrad. This lineup dissolved when the Johansson brothers Anders and Jens left the band, while Turner went on to join Deep Purple.

=== Deep Purple ===
Turner had invitations from both Bad Company and Foreigner to join them, but opted to join Deep Purple. With that band he recorded one album, Slaves and Masters (1990). The album peaked at No. 87 on the Billboard 200, which was below expectations for a Deep Purple album. A relatively successful tour followed in 1991, especially in Europe, with Turner willing to sing songs from the Coverdale era of the band, something Ian Gillan had refused. Turner was let go by the band in late 1992 in the middle of sessions for a follow-up album (which eventually became The Battle Rages On...) to make way for a returning Gillan in time for the 25th anniversary of the band. He has also put out three albums for the progressive rock band Mother's Army, featuring Jeff Watson, Bob Daisley, and Carmine Appice.

== Solo (1992–present) ==
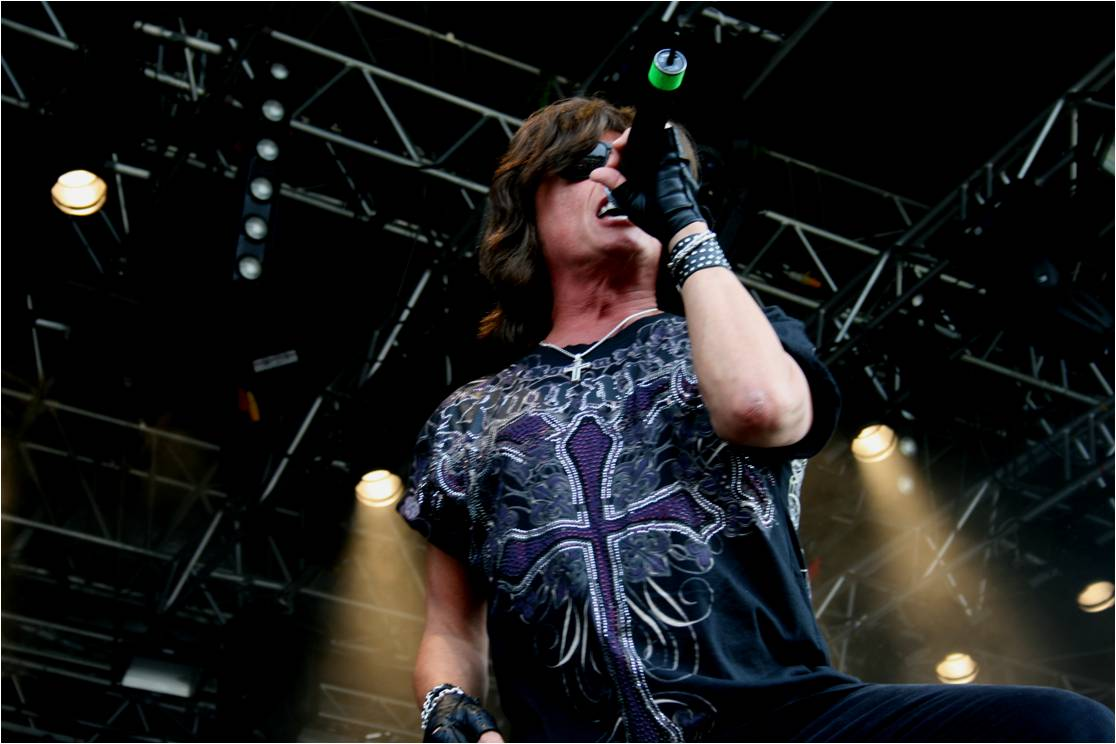
Turner fronting the Rainbow tribute band Over the Rainbow in 2010

In 1995, Turner released Nothing's Changed, with contributions from guitarist Al Pitrelli. In 1998 he released Hurry Up and Wait, including the track "Too Much Is Not Enough," which he co-wrote with Bob Held and Al Greenwood. Released in 2000, Holy Man featured a collaboration with blues guitarist Joe Bonamassa. Turner continues to release solo material.

In September 2025, Turner served as the United States member of the international jury at Intervision 2025, a Russia-hosted contest widely characterized in Western media as a politically framed alternative to Eurovision. During the live broadcast, he introduced himself to the audience as a U.S. juror.

== Personal life ==
On August 22, 2022, Turner revealed his long-standing battle with alopecia. Diagnosed at the age of three, Turner began wearing a wig at 14.

== Discography ==
=== Solo ===
- Rescue You (1985)
- Nothing's Changed (1995)
- Under Cover (1997, cover album)
- Hurry Up and Wait (1998)
- Under Cover 2 (1999, cover album)
- Holy Man (2000)
- Slam (2001)
- JLT (2003)
- The Usual Suspects(The devil's door) (2005)
- Second Hand Life (2007)
- Belly of the Beast (2022)

=== Compilations ===
- The Sessions (2016)

==== EPs ====
- Waiting for a Girl Like You (1999)
- Challenge Them All (2001)
- The One (2004)

==== Live albums ====
- Live in Germany (2008)
- Street of Dreams – Boston 1985 (2016)

=== As band member ===
| Year | Band | Title | Notes |
|---|---|---|---|
| 1977 | Fandango | Fandango | |
| 1978 | Fandango | Last Kiss | |
| 1979 | Fandango | One Night Stand | |
| 1980 | Fandango | Cadillac | |
| | Fandango | The Best of Fandango | Greatest Hits, Released 1999, Japan only |
| 1981 | Rainbow | Difficult to Cure | |
| 1981 | Rainbow | Live Boston 1981 | |
| 1982 | Rainbow | Straight Between the Eyes | |
| 1982 | Rainbow | Live Between the Eyes / The Final Cut | DVD, Released 2006 |
| 1983 | Rainbow | Bent Out of Shape | |
| 1984 | Rainbow | Live in Japan 1984 | DVD, CD, Recorded 1984, Rainbow Final Concert |
| 1986 | Rainbow | Finyl Vinyl | Compilation of live & B-side, 9 tracks |
| | Rainbow | A Light in the Black 1975–1984 | Compilation |
| 1988 | Yngwie Malmsteen | Odyssey | |
| 1989 | Yngwie Malmsteen | Trial by Fire: Live in Leningrad | CD, VHS, DVD |
| 1996 | Yngwie Malmsteen | Inspiration | cover album, tracks 2, 8 & 11 |
| 1990 | Deep Purple | Slaves and Masters | |
| 1993 | Mother's Army | Mother's Army | |
| 1997 | Mother's Army | Planet Earth | |
| 1998 | Mother's Army | Fire on the Moon | |
| 1996 | Brazen Abbot | Eye of the Storm | tracks 1, 2, 4 & 8 |
| 1997 | Brazen Abbot | Bad Religion | tracks 1. 4, 7 & 10 |
| 2003 | Brazen Abbot | Guilty as Sin | tracks 1, 4, 9 & 12 |
| 2004 | Brazen Abbot | A Decade of Brazen Abbot | live album |
| 2005 | Brazen Abbot | My Resurrection | tracks 1,4, 7 & 10 |
| 2008 | Brazen Abbot | Live at Berkrock | DVD |
| 2002 | Hughes Turner Project | HTP | |
| 2002 | Hughes Turner Project | Live in Tokyo | Live album |
| 2003 | Hughes Turner Project | HTP 2 | |
| 2005 | Michael Men Project | Made in Moscow | Collaboration with Glenn Hughes |
| 2005 | Akira Kajiyama and Joe Lynn Turner | Fire Without Flame | |
| 2006 | Sunstorm | Sunstorm | |
| 2009 | Sunstorm | House of Dreams | |
| 2012 | Sunstorm | Emotional Fire | |
| 2016 | Sunstorm | Edge of Tomorrow | |
| 2018 | Sunstorm | The Road to Hell | |
| 2007 | Cem Köksal featuring Joe Lynn Turner | Live! | CD & DVD |
| 2011 | Scott Rolaf feat. Joe Lynn Turner | Sense of Time | Self-Released Digital Only |
| 2011 | The Jan Holberg Project feat. Joe Lynn Turner | Light of Day | |
| 2013 | The Jan Holberg Project | At Your Service | tracks 2, 3 & 6 |
| 2014 | Rated X | Rated X | |
| 2019 | Come Taste the Band | Reignition | track 5 & 6 |
| 2021 | Michael Schenker Group | Immortal | track 2 & 9 |

=== Guest appearances ===
- Soundtrack The Heavenly Kid (1985) – "Heartless"
- Don Johnson – Heartbeat (1986) – backing vocals
- Michael Bolton – The Hunger (1987) – backing vocals
- Cher – Cher (1987) – backing vocals
- John Waite – Rovers Return (1987) – backing vocals
- Lee Aaron – Lee Aaron (1987) – co-writer on "Powerline", "Hands Are Tied" and "Number One".
- Jimmy Barnes – Freight Train Heart (1987) – co-writer of "Walk On"
- Bonfire – Fireworks (1987) – co-writer of "Sleeping All Alone" and "Sweet Obsession"
- TNT – Intuition (1988) – backing vocals
- Bonnie Tyler – Notes from America aka Hide Your Heart (1988) – backing vocals
- Don Johnson – Let It Roll (1989) – backing vocals
- Mick Jones – Mick Jones (1989)
- Alexa – Alexa (1989)
- Paul Carrack – Groove Approved (1989)
- Billy Joel – Storm Front (1989) – backing vocals
- Slyce – Slyce (1990)
- Riot – The Privilege of Power (1990) – vocals on "Killer"
- Michael Bolton – Time, Love and Tenderness (1991) – backing vocals
- Kathy Troccoli – Pure Attraction (1991) – backing vocals
- Lita Ford – Dangerous Curves (1991) – co-writer of "Little Too Early", backing vocals
- Hellcats – Hellcats 2 (1992)
- TNT – Realized Fantasies (1992) – backing vocals
- Taylor Dayne – Soul Dancing (1993) – backing vocals
- Bloodline – Bloodline (1994)
- L.A. Blues Authority vol. 5 – Cream of the Crop (1994 compilation of covers by Blues Bureau International) – "Sittin' on Top of the World"
- Deep Purple Tribute – Smoke on the Water (1994)
- Nerds – Poultry in Motion (1995)
- Black Night: Tribute to Deep Purple (1995)
- Toshi Kankawa – Toshi Kankawa (1996)
- Mojo Brothers – Mojo Brothers (1997)
- Thunderbolt: A Tribute to AC/DC (1997) – "Back in Black"
- Vick LeCar – Never Stranded (1998)
- Stuart Smith – Heaven & Earth (1998)
- Niji Densetsu – Rainbow Tribute (1998)
- Randy Rhoads Tribute (1999) – "Mr Crowley", "Over the Mountain", "Diary of a Madman"
- Leslie West – As Phat as It Gets (1999)
- Fire Woman: A Tribute to the Cult (2000) – "The Rain"
- Bat Head Soup: A Tribute to Ozzy (2000) – "Hellraiser"
- Tribute to Van Halen (2000) – "Dance the Night Away"
- Nikolo Kotzev – Nikolo Kotzev's Nostradamus (2001)
- Voices for America – Special WTC EP (2001)
- Aerosmith Tribute – Let the Tribute Do the Talking (2001) – "Let the Music Do the Talking"
- Rock Ballads – WTC Benefit (2001)
- Stone Cold Queen: A Tribute (2001) – "Fat Bottomed Girls"
- Terry Brock – Freedom (2001)
- The Tour Bus Radio Show – The Road Trip (2002)
- Mountain – Mystic Fire (2002)
- Mr. Big Tribute – Influences and Connections (2003) – "Colorado Bulldog", "Daddy Brother Lover Little Boy"
- Murray Weinstock – Tails of the City (2003)
- Metallic Attack: The Ultimate Tribute (2004) – "Nothing Else Matters"
- Karl Cochran's Voodooland – Give Me Air (2004)
- Eddie Ojeda – Axes 2 Axes (2005)
- Numbers from the Beast (2005) – "2 Minutes to Midnight"
- Vitalij Kuprij – Revenge (2005) – "Follow Your Heart"
- Michael Schenker Group – Heavy Hitters (2005) – "All Shook Up"
- Blackmore's Night – The Village Lanterne (2006) – bonus track version of "Street of Dreams"
- Icarus Witch – Songs for the Lost (2007)
- Jimi Jamison – Crossroads Moment (2008)
- We Wish You a Metal Xmas and a Headbanging New Year (2008) – "Rockin' Around the Xmas Tree"
- Howard Leese – Secret Weapon (2009) – "Alive Again", "Hot to Cold"
- The Ultimate Tribute to Ozzy Osbourne (2009) – "Hellraiser"
- Voices of Rock - High & Mighty (2009) - "Tonight"
- MelodicRock.com, Vol. 7 – Forces of Dark & Light (2010) – "This Is Who I Am" – premiere song
- Pushking – The World as We Love It (2011) – "Kukarracha", "Head Shooter"
- Robin Beck – The Great Escape (2011) – "That All Depends"
- Who Are You: An All Star Tribute to the Who (2012) – "The Seeker"
- George Gakis & Very Special Friends – Too Much Ain't Never Enough (2012) – "Street of Broken Dreams"
- Avantasia – The Mystery of Time (2013) – "Spectres", "The Watchmakers' Dream", "Savior in the Clockwork", "The Great Mystery"
- Fly Like an Eagle: An All-Star Tribute to Steve Miller Band (2013) – "Jungle Love"
- Light My Fire: A Classic Rock Salute to the Doors (2014) – "Riders on the Storm"
- Magnus Karlsson's Free Fall – Kingdom of Rock (2015) – "No Control"
- Paco Ventura – Black Moon (2015) - "The End"
- The Parliament of Souls – project honouring the memory of Václav Havel (2016)
- Bob Daisley and Friends – Moore Blues for Gary (2018) - "The Blues Just Got Sadder", "Power of the Blues"
- Star One – Revel in Time (2022) – "The Year of '41"
- КняZz – Stalker (2024)
