= Greg Smith (American musician) =

American bassist

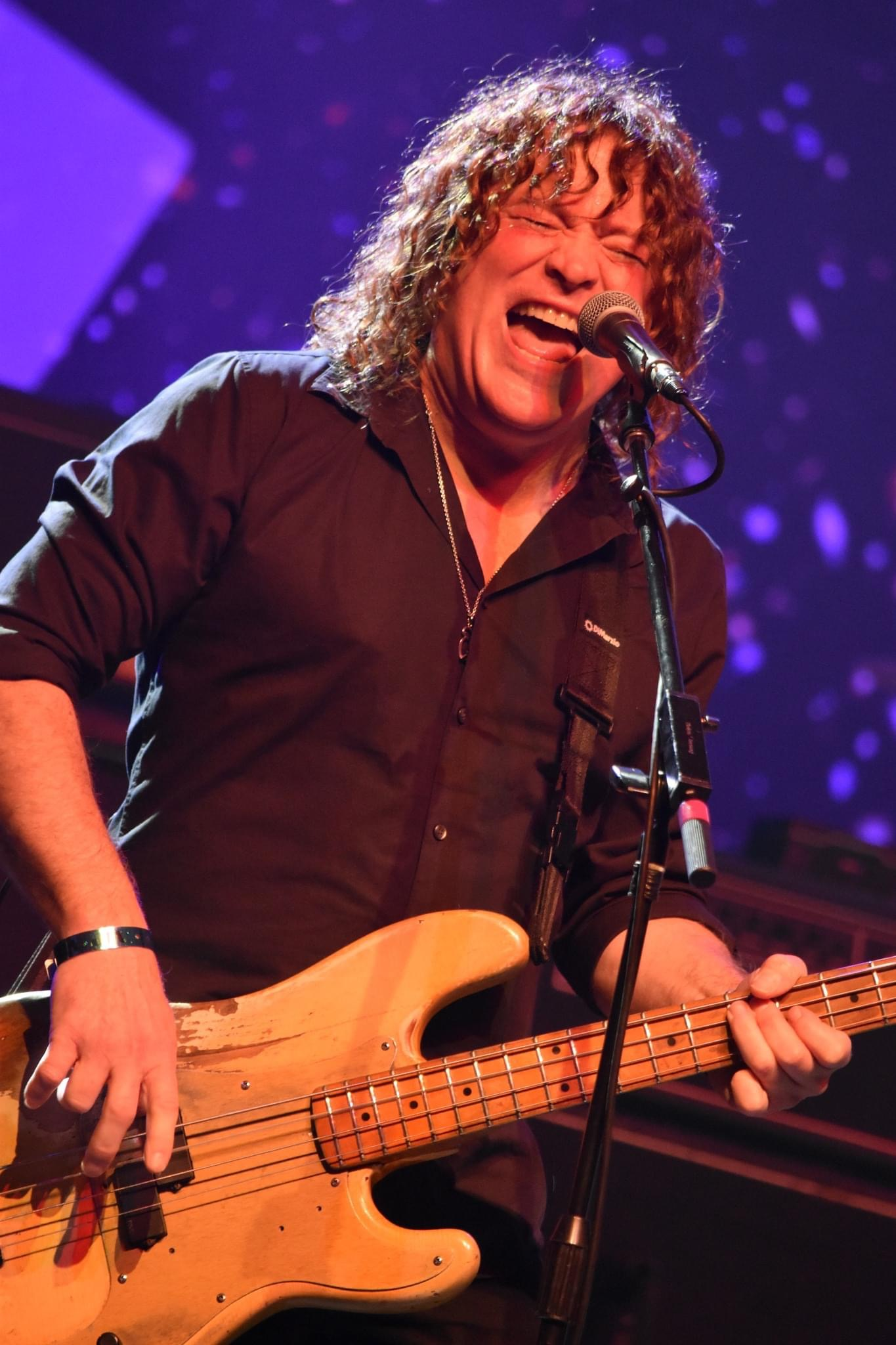
- Smith performing with The Guess Who in 2023

Background information
- Born: Gregory Smith; May 21, 1963 (age 63)
- Occupation: Musician
- Instruments: Bass guitar, vocals
- Years active: 1984 - Present

Gregory Smith (born May 21, 1963) is an American bassist and vocalist known for his tenure with rock musician Ted Nugent from 2007 to 2022, among other artists.

== Biography ==
He has collaborated with Billy Joel, Wendy O. Williams, Alice Cooper, Blue Öyster Cult, Dokken, Vinnie Moore, Joe Lynn Turner, Ted Nugent, Tommy James & the Shondells, Alan Parsons, The Turtles, Felix Cavaliere, Chuck Negron, Joey Molland, Denny Laine, Glenn Frey, and The Wizards of Winter.

Smith was a member of Plasmatics in 1983.

Smith appears in the film Wayne's World as a member of Alice Cooper's band, performing "Feed My Frankenstein". Smith toured with Cooper from 1991 to 1995, then again from 1999 to 2001.

In 1993, Smith joined a reformed Rainbow with Ritchie Blackmore. Smith remained with the group until 1997, when they disbanded. From 2008 to 2011, he and a few other members from Rainbow, including band leader and guitarist Ritchie Blackmore's son Jürgen, were in Over the Rainbow.

Smith toured with Blue Öyster Cult, in the summer of 1995, leaving due to previous touring commitments to Alice Cooper & Rainbow.

In 2001, Smith was asked by Billy Joel guitarist Tommy Byrnes to be a part of the upcoming Billy Joel / Twyla Tharp Broadway musical Movin Out. and remained with the show until closing in Dec 2005. He later performed a year on the road with the Movin Out road company from Mar 2006 - Feb 2007.

Smith toured with Dokken in 2003 & 2009.

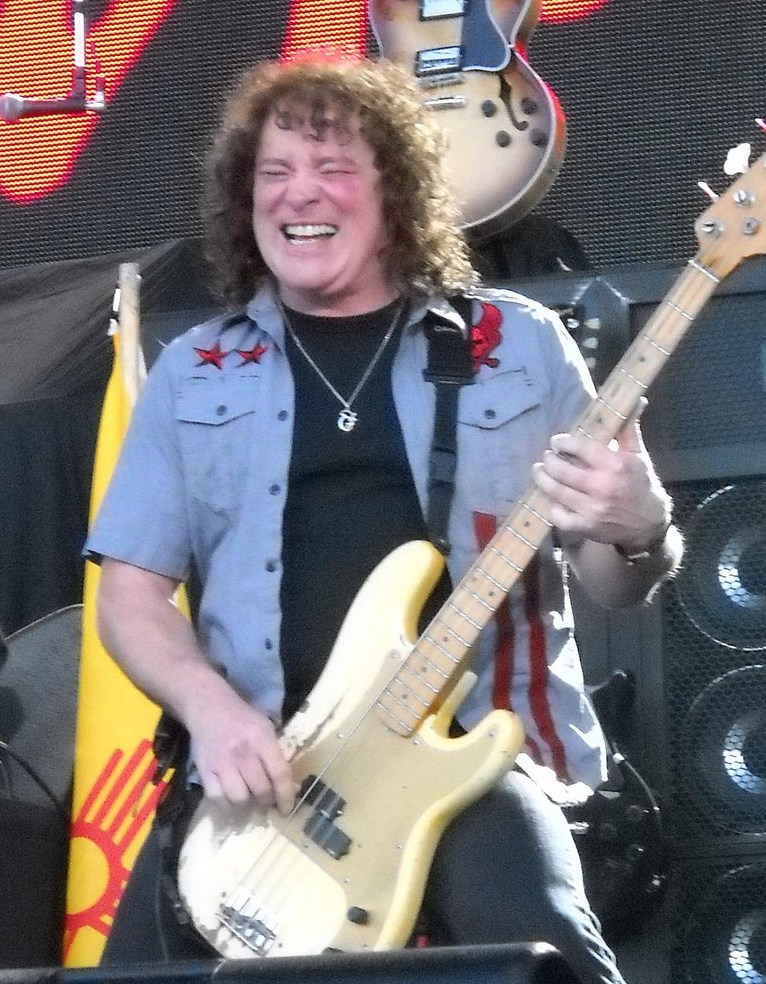
Smith performing with Ted Nugent in 2012

He joined the Ted Nugent band in 2007. Smith recorded six albums with Nugent, and in concert played the bass guitar and also sang the backing vocals as well as lead vocals originally performed by Derek St. Holmes.

He played with Billy Joel in 2012 at two benefits for the victims of Hurricane Sandy. The NBC Telethon Hurricane Sandy: Coming Together and The 12-12-12 Concert at Madison Square Garden.

In 2015, Smith toured with The Wizards of Winter, and in 2016, he became an official member. Smith joined Tyketto in 2017.

He announced that he was leaving Nugent's band in 2022.

In 2023, Smith joined an unauthorized version of The Guess Who run by original members Garry Peterson & Jim Kale. The band ended in April 2024 due to lawsuits brought by hitmakers Burton Cummings & Randy Bachman against Peterson & Kale.
