= List of Trapeze band members =

Trapeze were an English rock band from Cannock, Staffordshire. Formed in March 1969, the band originally featured former The Montanas members John Jones (vocals, trumpet) and Terry Rowley (keyboards, guitar, flute), as well as former Finders Keepers members Mel Galley (guitar, vocals), Glenn Hughes (bass, piano, vocals) and Dave Holland (drums). After the band released their self-titled debut album in May 1970, Jones and Rowley left to return to The Montanas. Hughes, Galley and Holland released Medusa later in the year and You Are the Music... We're Just the Band in 1972, before Hughes left to join Deep Purple in June 1973. Prior to his departure, Hughes was due to switch to the role of second guitarist, with Pete MacKie set to take his place on bass; however, this never came to fruition.

The band resurfaced in 1974 with second guitarist Rob Kendrick, bassist Pete Wright, returning keyboardist Rowley and Galley on lead vocals, signing to Warner Bros. Records and releasing their fourth album Hot Wire later in the year. A second self-titled album followed in 1975, on which Hughes performed vocals on two tracks. Following the breakup of Deep Purple in 1976, Hughes briefly returned to the band to tour and record with Galley and Holland, although the reunion was short-lived and the recordings surfaced on the bassist's debut solo album Play Me Out in 1977. Wright subsequently returned to Trapeze, and Peter Goalby joined as lead vocalist and second guitarist in time to perform on the band's final studio album Hold On in 1978. Holland later left in August 1979 to join heavy metal band Judas Priest.

In 1981, Trapeze recorded and released their first live album Live in Texas: Dead Armadillos, which featured Holland's replacement Steve Bray on drums, and was the band's last release to feature Goalby before he left to join Uriah Heep later in the year. Bray was replaced by Kex Gorin later in the year, while Mervyn Spence (bass, vocals) and Richard Bailey (keyboards) also joined briefly, before Trapeze split up in 1982 as Galley joined Whitesnake. The Hughes-Galley-Holland lineup of the band reunited in 1991 for a touring cycle which also featured keyboardist Geoff Downes, recording the live album Welcome to the Real World in May the following year. The trio returned again in 1994 to perform a string of shows in the United States and Europe, adding second guitarist Craig Erickson to their lineup.

== Members ==
Image	Name	Years active	Instruments	Release contributions
	Mel Galley	1969–1982; 1991–1992; 1993–1994 (died 2008)	guitar; vocals (lead 1973–76 and 1976–78, backing otherwise); bass (studio, 1969)	all Trapeze releases
	Dave Holland	1969–1979; 1991–1992; 1993–1994 (died 2018)	drums; percussion	all Trapeze releases, except Live in Texas: Dead Armadillos (1981)
	Glenn Hughes	1969–1973; 1976; 1991–1992; 1993–1994	bass; lead vocals; piano; guitar and trombone (studio, 1969)	Trapeze (1970); Medusa (1970); You Are the Music... We're Just the Band (1972); Trapeze (1975) (guest appearance on vocals for two tracks); Welcome to the Real World: Live at the Borderline (1998); Live Way Back to the Bone (1998)
	Terry Rowley	1969–1970; 1974–1976	keyboards; synthesisers; piano; guitar; backing vocals; flute	Trapeze (1970); Hot Wire (1974); Hold On (1979); Live at the Boat Club (2006)
	John Jones	1969–1970	trumpet; vocals	Trapeze (1970)
	Pete Wright	1974–1976; 1976–1981	bass; backing vocals	Hot Wire (1974); Trapeze (1975); Hold On (1979); Live in Texas: Dead Armadillos (1981); Live at the Boat Club (2006)
	Rob Kendrick	1974–1976	guitar; backing vocals	Hot Wire (1974); Trapeze (1975); Live at the Boat Club (2006)
	Peter Goalby	1978–1981	guitar; lead vocals	Hold On (1979); Live in Texas: Dead Armadillos (1981)
	Steve Bray	1980–1982	drums	Live in Texas: Dead Armadillos (1981)
	Mervyn Spence	1981–1982	bass; lead vocals	none
	Richard Bailey	1981–1982	keyboards	none
	Kex Gorin	1982 (died 2007)	drums	none
	Geoff Downes	1991–1992	keyboards	Welcome to the Real World: Live at the Borderline (1998)
	Craig Erickson	1994	guitar	none

== Lineups ==
Period	Members	Releases
March 1969 – August 1970	Glenn Hughes – lead vocals, bass, piano, guitar, trombone; Mel Galley – guitar, bass, backing vocals; Dave Holland – drums, percussion; Terry Rowley – keyboards, synthesisers, piano, guitar, flute, backing vocals; John Jones – trumpet, co-lead vocals	Trapeze (1970)
August 1970 – July 1973	Glenn Hughes – lead vocals, bass, piano; Mel Galley – guitar, backing vocals; Dave Holland – drums, percussion	Medusa (1970); You Are the Music... We're Just the Band (1972); The Final Swing (1974) – two new tracks; Live: Way Back to the Bone (1998)
Band inactive late 1973 – early 1974
Early 1974 – July 1976	Mel Galley – lead vocals, guitar; Rob Kendrick – guitar, backing vocals; Pete Wright – bass, backing vocals; Dave Holland – drums, percussion; Terry Rowley – keyboards, backing vocals	Hot Wire (1974); Trapeze (1975); Live at the Boat Club 1975 (2006)
July – September 1976	Glenn Hughes – lead vocals, bass, piano; Mel Galley – guitar, backing vocals; Dave Holland – drums, percussion	none – live performances only
Band inactive late 1976 – early 1978
Early 1978 – August 1979	Peter Goalby – lead vocals, guitar; Mel Galley – guitar, backing vocals; Pete Wright – bass, backing vocals; Dave Holland – drums, percussion; Terry Rowley – keyboards	Running (1978); Hold On (1979)
Late 1979 – late 1981	Peter Goalby – lead vocals, guitar; Mel Galley – guitar, backing vocals; Pete Wright – bass, backing vocals; Steve Bray – drums, percussion	Live in Texas: Dead Armadillos (1981)
Late 1981 – early 1982	Mervyn Spence – lead vocals, bass; Mel Galley – guitar, backing vocals; Steve Bray – drums, percussion; Richard Bailey – keyboards, synthesisers	none – live performances only
Early – late 1982	Mervyn Spence – lead vocals, bass; Mel Galley – guitar, backing vocals; Kex Gorin – drums, percussion; Richard Bailey – keyboards, synthesisers	none – live performances only
Band inactive late 1982 – late 1991
Late 1991 – May 1992	Glenn Hughes – lead vocals, bass; Mel Galley – guitar, backing vocals; Dave Holland – drums, percussion; Geoff Downes – keyboards, synthesisers	Welcome to the Real World (1993)
Band inactive May 1992 – February 1994
February – May 1994	Glenn Hughes – lead vocals, bass; Mel Galley – guitar, backing vocals; Craig Erickson – guitar; Dave Holland – drums, percussion	none – live performances only
