= On the Highwire =

Compilation album by Trapeze
- Released: 2 December 2003
- Recorded: 1970–1979
- Genre: Hard rock; blues rock; funk rock
- Length: 2:34:36
- Label: Castle
- Producer: Trapeze; Jimmy Miller

Trapeze chronology
Live at the Boat Club 1975 (2003)	On the Highwire (2003)

On the Highwire is a compilation album by English rock band Trapeze. Released on 2 December 2003 by Castle Communications, the album features all tracks from the band's 1979 sixth and final studio album Hold On, the 1998 live album Live: Way Back to the Bone and the 1981 live album Live in Texas: Dead Armadillos.

== Reception ==
AllMusic writer Greg Prato claimed that "since On the Highwire skips the group's studio work with Hughes (which is by far the group's strongest work), [it] fails to deliver as a true career overview", noting that the first disc "falls a bit flat" but adding that the second "fares much better, as it focuses on much stronger material".

== Track listing ==
=== Disc one ===
Hold On (1979)
No.	Title	Writer(s)	Length
1.	"Don't Ask Me How I Know"	Peter Goalby	2:48
2.	"Take Good Care"	Mel Galley	3:33
3.	"When You Go to Heaven"	Goalby	4:09
4.	"Livin' on Love"	Goalby	3:48
5.	"Hold On"	M. Galley	5:03
6.	"Don't Break My Heart"	M. Galley	5:40
7.	"Running"	M. Galley	4:26
8.	"You Are"	M. Galley	4:49
9.	"Time Will Heal"	M. Galley	6:36
Total length:			40:52

Live: Way Back to the Bone (1998)
No.	Title	Writer(s)	Length
10.	"Way Back to the Bone"	Glenn Hughes	7:47
11.	"You Are the Music"	M. Galley; Tom Galley	5:37
12.	"Seafull"	Hughes	8:50
13.	"Your Love Is Alright"	Hughes; M. Galley; Dave Holland	13:43
Total length:			35:57

=== Disc two ===
Live: Way Back to the Bone continued
No.	Title	Writer(s)	Length
1.	"Medusa"	Hughes	8:24
2.	"Black Cloud"	M. Galley; T. Galley	9:17
3.	"Keepin' Time"	M. Galley; T. Galley	8:35
4.	"Touch My Life"	M. Galley; T. Galley	9:33
Total length:			35:49

Live in Texas: Dead Armadillos (1981)
No.	Title	Writer(s)	Length
5.	"Back Street Love"	M. Galley; T. Galley	6:57
6.	"Hold On"	M. Galley	5:29
7.	"Midnight Flyer"	M. Galley; T. Galley	7:32
8.	"You Are the Music"	M. Galley; T. Galley	6:01
9.	"Black Cloud"	M. Galley; T. Galley	9:05
10.	"Way Back to the Bone"	Hughes	6:59
Total length:			42:03

== Personnel ==
Hold On personnel

- Peter Goalby – lead vocals, guitar, production
- Mel Galley – lead guitar, vocals, production
- Pete Wright – bass, production
- Dave Holland – drums, production
- Jimmy Miller – production
- Rota Sound Strings – arrangements
- Brad Davies – engineering
- Guy Bidmeade – engineering

Live: Way Back to the Bone personnel

- Glenn Hughes – vocals, bass
- Mel Galley – guitar
- Dave Holland – drums

Live in Texas: Dead Armadillos personnel

- Peter Goalby – lead vocals
- Mel Galley – guitar, vocals, production
- Pete Wright – bass
- Steve Bray – drums
- Malcolm Harper – engineering
- Mason Harlow – engineering assistance
- John MacKenzie Burns – mixing
