= Major League Productions =

Major League Productions (MLP)
- MLPLIVE /MLP Logo
- Company type: Private
- Traded as: Major League Records, MLPLIVE, Hyper UK, MLPMAN, MLP LTD, Billy's Discs and Records Shack
- Industry: Music industry
- Genre: Rock, Funk, Soul, Jazz, Indie, Punk, Techno, House, Classical and Modern
- Founded: 1995 (As Major League Records renamed MLPLIVE)
- Founder: Mr Mike Dixon
- Fate: Active
- Headquarters: Various Office Locations Worldwide, Oxfordshire, United Kingdom
- Number of locations: 100 of 196 Countries
- Area served: Worldwide
- Products: CD, Audio downloads
- Services: Audio Restoration, Record Label and MP3 Downloads, Record Shops
- Owner: Mike Dixon
- Number of employees: 39
- Parent: Hyper UK/ Hyper Worldwide
- Divisions: Hyper UK, MLPLIVE1, MLPMAN, Major League Productions, Billy's Discs And Records Shack
- Subsidiaries: Hyper
- Website: mlplive.com

Major League Productions is a record label from the United Kingdom based in Oxfordshire. It was founded in 1991 and operates in 100 different countries. As of 2013, it had 39 employees. Following a reduction of live services, in 2020 the company announced it was focusing only on its back-catalogue work and talked of the possibility of new vinyl releases to signed artists.

== History ==
=== Music operations ===
The label, which began in 1995, was founded in Banbury and was aimed at the rock genre before expanding its field. Two years after its foundation, their first record, by Home, was released. The release was aimed at the UK market until the label obtained European and worldwide distribution. Only three months later, the Kokomo album Live 75 was released, the label was criticised for the album as it had described itself as a rock music label and this release was soul and funk, the album was sold in Europe and had main interest in Germany.

=== Hyper UK ===
In 2007, MLP's parent label Hyper UK was set up to create new and abstract releases by bands such as Smash. The label has registered under Major League Productions, but is advertised as a separate label.

=== 2000s ===
Once the label was established, it tried to expand its presence, focusing on larger artists and bands such as Thin Lizzy and Alex Harvey. The label then developed its online services by offering downloads and YouTube services in 2005–2007. Finally, the label sought only download LPs explaining a limited release.

== TV and film operations ==
The company also operates a production service with previous services to live TV productions, Corporate Videos, Video Advertising and Sports Films. Live broadcasting was also provided for secondary companies such as the BBC and RTE. The company also operated a number of live events, pre-concert entertainment and had representatives in the middle East and Asia.

== QR code introduction ==
As MLP began to grow their CD and release network, a QR code was made that linked it to their website; this was used for publicity and label forms. In 2009, the label became the first record label to add a QR code to their CD releases.

== RSS feed introduction ==
In 2011, the Major League Productions or MLPLIVE1 news feed became available, the feed focuses on the YouTube channel MLPLIVE1 and also included information about new releases and fictional information. The RSS feed is available on many platforms this includes: PSP, BMW Online, iDrive, Calendar plus, Windows Desktop RSS gadget, and Feeddler RSS Reader for iPad and iPhone.

== Mlpman UK and worldwide ==
Mlpman is the eBay and Amazon operating name of MLPLIVE. It was formed on 17 July 2000. The record label owns and maintains the sub as well as control its logistics. From 1 January 2001, MLPMAN went worldwide. However, MLPMAN now rarely operates on Amazon as of Amazon offering the product under its own brand.

== Mlplive.com shop ==
The Mlplive.com shop opened in 2007 and allows customers to purchase CDs without going through either shops or Mlpman. The shop sells all CDs and alerts the audience when an album is available for downloads. Currently, the only payment accepted on this service is PayPal.

== News and press coverage ==
The record label has experienced a number of press and news releases especially that of its UK tour 75 Thin Lizzy release.

=== Twitter feed ===
The label officially launched its Twitter feed on 17 July 2013. The feed is described to give information about the label, new releases and the song of the day feature. The creation of the Twitter feed is aimed to help the label move into the tech revolution as well as promote itself. The label has around 310 followers at present.

=== Television advertisements ===
Between 2008 and 2011, the record label ran promo television advertisements during related shows and themes. The advertisements were mainly shown on Icelandic, Scandinavian, Estonian, and European T.V., with the exception of Niger. The advertisements included information about the releases and were to buy them and were language developed to the specific region. Upon MLPLIVE'S reports it concluded 137 advertisements had been shown and that the label would now advertise online in these regions.

=== Thin Lizzy – UK Tour 75 ===
Released in September 2008, the CD has a large amount of publicity this included news articles in The Daily Express and Birmingham Times, as well as a number of magazines including the Record Collector, it was rated four stars out of five by The Daily Express.

=== Alex Harvey releases ===
Alex Harvey releases have had a number of press and review articles this includes sections on all the three of the releases on the following press sites and companies:

- News of the world
- Kerrang
- Mojo (magazine)
- Record Collector
- Classic Rock (magazine)
- The Detour
- Great Yarmouth Advertiser
- Clash Magazine

=== Other releases ===
Other releases have also gain publicity with majority of the company releases, this includes articles on services such as Mojo and Record Collector magazines, Newsvine, Rate Your Music and MTV.

=== Mojo magazine insert ===
In May 2013, the label has allowed an insert of The Sensational Alex Harvey Band which included one of the songs free on a promo Audio-CD in the Mojo (magazine). The disc cover was highlighted by using an outline of Harvey himself. The magazine is estimated to sell 85,149 copies and is sold across the United Kingdom.

== Artists ==
=== Major League Productions ===
- A Band Called O
- Baker Gurvitz Army
- Canned Heat
- Captain Beefheart
- Caravan
- Carter the Unstoppable Sex Machine
- Climax Blues Band
- Gaye Bykers on Acid
- Gentle Giant
- Gong
- The Groundhogs
- Heavy Metal Kids
- Home
- Kokomo
- Nucleus
- Pink Fairies
- Renaissance
- The Sensational Alex Harvey Band
- Soft Machine
- Thin Lizzy
- Trapeze

=== Additional talent services ===
The company previously represented modelling talent briefly for music purposes only sourcing talent for music videos and corporate music productions

=== Hyper Productions UK ===
- Smash

== Online/YouTube services ==
In 2012, the company launched its YouTube service, the label currently publishes samples, promos and advertisements. The channel MLPLIVE1 is spread across both YouTube and Dailymotion and mainly operated and focuses on Northern Europe and the USA. As of 10 March the company elected to use the new YouTube channel layout, this has since been a success as of being the first record label to do this evidence of this is seen when the company gained one hundred subscribers in one day.

== Release Descriptions MLP ==
=== Home – Live BBC Sessions 1970−73 ===
Classic BBC live recordings from one of the most under-rated British rock bands of the early 1970s. Featuring the twin guitars of Laurie Wisefield and Mick Stubbs, the band riff and solo through every song. The songs here are heavier and extended from their studio output and this CD features tracks from all three Home albums including a complete live run-through the concept album The Alchemist, plus previously unreleased material. The sessions were recorded for Bob Harris and John Peel shows plus tracks from the In Concert series.

=== Kokomo – Live in Concert 1975 ===
This was recorded in December 1975 as the band toured between their first two albums, Kokomo (1975) and Rise and Shine (1977). The set features songs from both these albums plus previously unreleased material.

=== Caravan – Live UK Tour '75 ===
A previously unreleased live recording by one of the leaders of the Canterbury scene, Caravan, at Nottingham Polytechnic in 1975, found the band in a period of change as the band were between record deals and labels. Having just changed their keyboard player, sessions for a new album were about to start when the band went on tour.

=== Trapeze – Live at the Boat Club ===
See Separate Page Live at the Boat Club for more information.

Recorded at the Boat Club in Nottingham on 13 September 1975 for an on-air radio broadcast, this live set includes 70 minutes of high energy live classic rock. Having just returned from asuccessful US Tour headlining 20,000 seat venues, Trapeze played a short UK tour to promote their latest album Trapeze (1976). Featuring guitarist Mel Galley (ex-Whitesnake) and drummer Dave Holland (ex-Judas Priest) the band play a set of classic old numbers, new tracks and covers.

=== Groundhogs – Live UK Tour 1976 ===
A previously unreleased live recording captures The Groundhogs in concert at the Kings Hall, Derby on a UK tour in 1976 for a live radio broadcast. Tony McPhee added a second lead guitarist which really beefs up the sound as the band play tracks from their latest albums, live favourites including a manic 14-minute encore of "Cherry Red" and some other rarer live tracks.

=== Carter USM – BBC Live in Concert 1991−94 ===
78 minutes of previously unreleased BBC performances at six different venues: Wembley Arena (1991), Kilburn National (1991), Norwich Sound City (1992), Glastonbury (1992), Reading University (1994) and Phoenix (1994). It captures the duo from their rise to fame in early 1991 at Wembley through an electric performance at Kilburn and a headline slot at the Glastonbury Festival. This

=== The Sensational Alex Harvey Band – British Tour '76 ===
Previously unreleased on-air radio broadcast recording at the De Montfort Hall in Leicester, during The Sensational Alex Harvey Band's 1976 UK tour promoting the album SAHB Stories (1976). Great quality and mastered from the original tapes, this album considered 'better' than the official live album and fully authorised by the band, who write sleeve notes in a 16-page booklet full of great live photos and an intro by biographer Martin Kielty.

=== Baker Gurvitz Army – Live in Derby '75 ===
Official band-authorized CD release of a previously unreleased live recording from Baker Gurvitz Army in 1975 while the band were touring the second album Elysian Encounter (1975). Featuring rock star 'Cream' drummer Ginger Baker and Adrian and Paul Gurvitz (Three Man Army) with the vocals of Snips (Sharks). Recorded for a live radio broadcast, on 21 October 1975, the set features songs from their first two albums plus Cream covers and unreleased material.

=== Gong – Live in Sherwood Forest '75 ===
See CD Page Live in Sherwood Forest '75 for more information Official, band-authorised CD, contains a previously unreleased live recording from the University of Nottingham on 25 November 1975. Originally an on-air radio broadcast, this set features the penultimate gig with guitarist Steve Hillage on his farewell tour with Gong, days before he was to leave for his solo career. Contains tracks from upcoming 1976 album Shamal and the 1974 album You plus tracks from Steve's recent solo album Fish Rising (1975).

=== Soft Machine – British Tour '75 ===
Soft Machine recorded In Concert for an on-air radio broadcast at the University of Nottingham in October 1975 on a short British Tour between the recording of the two albums, Bundles (1975) and Softs (1976). The album includes three improvs/jams totalling over 30 minutes of music.

=== Renaissance – British Tour '76 ===
Renaissance recorded at the University of Nottingham on 24 January 1976 during a 10-date British University Tour for an on-air radio broadcast. This set has over 78 minutes of live music including favourites: "Running Hard", "Ocean Gypsy" plus the nine part 25+ minute epic "Song of Scheherazade" and a rousing encore of "Ashes Are Burning".

=== Captain Beefheart – Amsterdam '80 ===
Captain Beefheart & The Magic Band recorded at Paradiso in Amsterdam on 1 November 1980 while on a European Tour promoting the album Doc at the Radar Station (1980). This superb quality recording was made by the Dutch for an on-air radio broadcast and has been mastered from the original tapes.

=== Nucleus – UK Tour '76 (2 CD) ===
Ian Carr's Nucleus recorded at Loughborough University in Leicester on 18 February 1976 while on a 12-date British university Winter Tour promoting their latest album Alleycat (1975) playing a varied mix of Jazz Rock, Fusion and Funk. This live 2CD has over 102 minutes of great quality music featuring Jazz legend Ian Carr and a superb band of musicians that made up the group-Nucleus. Originally recorded for an on-air radio broadcast, and mastered from the original tapes-fully authorised by Ian Carr and the band.

=== The Sensational Alex Harvey Band – US Tour 74 (2CD) ===
Recorded at two different venues on The Sensational Alex Harvey Band's 1974 North American Tour, this 2CD features two 1-hour sets recorded for an on-air radio broadcasts at the Cleveland Agora and the Electric Company in Dallas while promoting their latest album The Impossible Dream (1974). Mastered from the original master tapes, the superb quality sets include a full 16m version of "Anthem" and great full version of "The Hot City Symphony" including "Man in the Jar".

=== Canned Heat – Under the Dutch Skies 1970−74 ===
Official release-authorised by the band. This 2 CD has over 150 mins of live Canned Heat recorded by Dutch state radio in Baarn 1970, Arcen 1971 and Amsterdam 1974. Mastered from the original archive tapes, these great quality sets include hit singles: "Lets Work Together", "On the Road Again", "Going Up the Country", plus album tracks and lengthy boogie jamming.

=== Thin Lizzy – UK Tour '75 ===
See CD Page UK Tour '75 for more information Recorded live at Derby College on their UK tour in November 1975. This official release is fully authorized by the band and taken from the original radio recorded tapes which have been remastered under the band's supervision and presented here with the full complete show comprising fifteen tracks in superb quality.

This previously unreleased live recording features the Thin Lizzy classic line up performing songs from both the Nightlife (1974) and Fighting (1975) albums plus rare live versions of "Little Darling", "The Rocker", a prototype version of "Cowboy Song" which had still to be recorded and which Phil Lynot titles here, as "Derby Blues" and even a sound check jam session recorded minutes before the gig.

This album is released as a deluxe CD contains over 78 minutes of classic live Thin Lizzy and a full colour 20-page booklet crammed full of live photos and extensive liner notes from Brian Downey. With success just around the corner and following tours in Britain and the States, the band are slick, raunchy and at the top of their game with the music in this release.

=== Pink Fairies – Finland Freak Out 1971 ===
Recorded live at the Ruisrock Festival in Turku, Finland, in 1971. The Pink Fairies made a rare overseas trip by travelling to southern Finland for an appearance on the second day at the three-day Ruisrock festival. The state radio station recorded only a selection of bands and luckily the Fairies were one of these. With ex-drummer Twink departed, the band were now a threesome and comprised: Paul Rudolph (guitar) and Duncan Sanderson (bass) and Russell Hunter (drums). They still packed an almighty punch and the power of the band is unleashed here in a one-hour set of four long acid-crazed psychedelic jams, which is well received by the large crowd. Mastered from the original tapes, the great quality recording is fully authorised by the band.

=== The Sensational Alex Harvey Band – Hot City: The 1974 Unreleased Album ===
In early 1974, The Sensational Alex Harvey Band went into the studios with US producer Shel Talmy to record sessions for their third album. Upon completion, the band decided they were not happy with the overall sound and amazingly decided to scrap the entire album. A fully mixed album by one of the biggest upcoming rock bands was left with Shel Talmy who departed back to Los Angeles not long after. Most of the songs were completely reworked with different arrangements and lyrics and appeared at the end of 1974 on the album The Impossible Dream. Now after 34 years, MLP have unearthed this treasure and the album has been re-assessed by both Shel Talmy & the band. The tracks have been completely remastered and fully approved by the band members. Now the fans can hear how songs like "Vambo", "Anthem" and "Man in the Jar" originally sounded.

=== The Groundhogs – Swedish Radio Masters '76 ===
In September 1976, The Groundhogs were a four piece adding second guitarist Ric Adams to bolster the sound and allow Tony McPhee more space to develop his amazing guitar runs. The Swedish gig was part of a 1976 Autumn European tour which was promoting their upcoming album Black Diamond (1976). This recording is set in the Radio station's own in-house venue Studio 4, and features tracks from that album, Hogwash (1972) and two stage favourites from their top 5 hit album Split (1971). "Split Part 2" and a massive 18+ minutes of their all-time classic "Cherry Red". Mastered direct from the original radio station tapes, the sound is superb as the band rip through a set of seven songs on the night. The CD has a Deluxe Digi-Pack with Inner Sleeve and a 12 Page colour booklet which includes liner notes and track/track analysis from lead guitarist Tony McPhee plus previously unseen live photos from that period of the band's history.

=== Gentle Giant – Live in Stockholm '75 ===
In 1975, Gentle Giant had completed a long winter US tour, followed in the summer by European Festival dates and more US gigs, written and recorded their 7th album Free Hand (1975) and were now about to tour the album with a European Autumn tour. Their gig at the Students Union's own venue: Club Kåren (Kårhuset) at Stockholm University on 12 November 1975, was a total sell-out and this CD release brings back all that excitement of the band at their prime, when they were headlining major cities all around the world. Mastered direct from the original radio station tapes, the sound is superb as the band play a selection of new tracks and stage favourites from earlier albums.

=== A Band Called O – On the Road 1975−77 ===
Between 1974 and 1977, A Band Called O recorded four albums and constantly toured the UK and Europe. Whilst the studio albums clearly demonstrate the musical talent within the band, the live setting was where they really shined. With a line-up of two guitars, keyboards and excellent vocal harmonies they played a variety of funk rock with great licks, riffs and textures. These two recordings were both recorded at the University of Nottingham for on-air radio broadcasts and capture the band at the height of their career on British tours in 1975 and 1977. This album represents the better of the two concerts and is the only live material ever released by the band. The set features tracks from all four of their studio albums and some previously unrecorded songs. All tracks in this recording are previously unreleased in any format.

=== Gaye Bykers On Acid – A Big Bad Beautiful Noize ===
Grunge, punk, rap and dance grooves mixed with the psychedelic excesses of the hippie counterculture, the Gaye Bykers On Acid had a strong reputation as a great live band but there has been no live album until now. The band have made available their own collection of live recordings from 1986 to 1990 from six different venues in England and the USA. This album includes live versions of album tracks, singles, cover songs and previously unreleased material from those live sets taken from over four years of touring

=== Climax Blues Band – World Tour 1976 ===
Climax Blues Band, were already an established blues rock band when the hot summer of 1976 arrived. Formed in Stafford in 1969, they had released nine albums on various labels, completed endless tours of the UK, Europe and USA and built a solid reputation as a sophisticated and classy outfit wherever they played. Their latest album Gold Plated was released in April 1976. When the decision to release a single from that album was made, no one would expect what was to come next. A new British tour in the autumn, to promote the new single was planned. One of the dates on Sunday 31 October at the University of Nottingham, was marked down for a local on-air radio broadcast. The original master tapes survive from that gig and capture the band on the verge of rock stardom. The new single "Couldn't Get It Right" with its appealing funk groove, stormed up the British charts reaching #5 in early November and was also a mega-hit in the US and Europe. Five days after this gig, the band appeared on the BBC TV show, Top of the Pops. Climax Blues Band and were then elevated into the big leagues, playing to 20,000 crowds in the US with further TV appearances and radio broadcasts, the band went global. This previously unreleased live recording is the full 75 minute set from that October night and features the Climax Blues Band at the top of their game, playing live favourites from some of their early albums, new tracks from the Gold Plated album and a great raw funky version of "Couldn't Get It Right".

=== The Heavy Metal Kids – Live at Trent Poly ===
Recorded by Radio Trent for an on-air radio broadcast from what surviving recorded portions. The radio station folded, many station recordings were tossed into a skip, and never seen again. One reel was salvaged by an engineer and it contained the last four songs of the one hour set. Unfortunately, the main part of the concert may be gone forever but MLP and the Heavy Metal Kids have decided to make available what survives as a release, as it has a unique song selection and made it a limited downloaded release.

== Hyper Releases ==
=== S*M*A*S*H – Icon ===
A new album of studio recordings from the 1990s indie punk trio S*M*A*S*H. The band were formed in Welwyn Garden City, Hertfordshire in the early 1990s. Comprising: Ed Borrie (guitar, vocals) Salvador Alessi (bass) and Rob Hague (drums), the band made an immediate impact with their debut single "Real Surreal" before appearing on BBC TV show, Top of the Pops with their top-20 single "Shame" which was also the NME single of the week. Their gigs were well received with the NME calling them 'the Stone Roses on PCP'. In 1994, they released the album Self Abused on Virgin Records, followed by the semi-live EP Another Love. Touring the US, they attracted attention from the US grunge label: Sub Pop, who re-recorded the song "Barrabas" for a one-off single. After a final single "Rest of My Life" in 1997, Smash then went off radar for several years before Borrie wrote new songs which they recorded in 2007 for the album Icon. It features ten new songs plus a bonus track only available on the download album. Released in October 2007 on MLP's new label, Hyper.
