= Mervyn Spence =

Musician and producer from Northern Ireland

- Also known as: O'Ryan; Spam; Merv Spence; Bearded Dragon
- Born: Mervyn Spence; 1958 (age 67–68); Larne, County Antrim, Northern Ireland
- Genres: Hard rock, progressive rock, pop rock, blues rock
- Occupations: Singer-songwriter, musician, producer
- Instruments: Vocals, bass, guitar
- Years active: 1980s–present
- Labels: Parachute music, Emjo Media
- Website: http://www.mervspence.co.uk

Mervyn "Spam" Spence (born 1958) is a Northern Irish musician and producer, best known for his work with Wishbone Ash and Trapeze.

== Musical career ==
Spence moved to Staffordshire from Ireland in the late 1970s, and began playing with bands such as The Jury and Big Daisy.

=== Trapeze ===
During Spence's time in local bands, he was spotted by Mel Galley, who promptly offered Spence the bassist and vocalist position in Trapeze, which had been left vacant since Peter Goalby had left to join Uriah Heep. Spence briefly toured with the band, and during his tenure recorded one album's worth of material, which – due to Galley's departure to replace Bernie Marsden in Whitesnake – remains unreleased. Several of the songs from these sessions however (Demos exist in bootleg form), would form a very small part of Tom Galley's Phenomena project, which Spence would later join to sing and play bass on the 1992 album "Innervision" (billed as "O'Ryan")

Spence later went on to buy the rights to the project, cashing in (and dining out) with a 'best of' compilation which featured a very small percentage of his work tagged onto the work of the real members of the project.

=== Wishbone Ash ===
Following the break-up of Trapeze, Spence was offered an audition for Wishbone Ash while he was pitching demo material to various outlets. On the strength of his vocal range and enthusiasm, Spence became a member of the band. Spence would perform on one album by the band, 1985's Raw to the Bone.

=== Post-Wishbone Ash ===
Spence left Wishbone Ash in 1986 "to pursue family matters". He has since released two solo albums under the name "O'Ryan" (his mother's maiden name), 1993's Something Strong and 1995's Initiate.

Spence secured a job lecturing music industry topics at Walsall College of Arts and Technology in the late-1990s early 2000s while hitting hard times musically.

== Discography ==
=== Solo ===
- Something Strong (1993; as "O'Ryan")
- "Emer May" (1995; as "O'Ryan")
- Initiate (1995; as "O'Ryan")
- Phenomena Recovered (2023; as "Merv Spence")

=== with Wishbone Ash ===
- Raw to the Bone (1985)
- 40th Anniversary Concert: Live In London (2010)
- Raw to the Bone (2018) (Remastered, second CD has demos and live tracks)

=== with Face Face ===
- Childhood Dreams (1994)
- Bridge to Nowhere (2006)

=== with Purple Cross ===
- Eyes of the Mirror (2000)

=== with Phenomena ===
- Phenomena III - Inner Vision (1992, as "O'Ryan")
- The Complete Works (2006)

=== with Big Daisy ===
- Big Daisy (2012)
