= High Flyers: The Best of Trapeze =

Greatest hits album by Trapeze
- Released: 1996
- Recorded: 1970–1974
- Genre: Hard rock
- Producer: Galley, Holland, Hughes

Trapeze chronology
Welcome to the Real World - live 1992 (1993)	High Flyers: The Best of Trapeze (1996)	Way Back to the Bone (1998)

Professional ratings
Review scores
Source	Rating
Allmusic	4.5/5 stars

High Flyers is a compilation album by the band Trapeze with the original line up of Galley, Holland, and Hughes.

== Track listing ==
1. Send Me No More Letters
2. Your Love Is Alright
3. Black Cloud
4. Medusa
5. Coast To Coast
6. Will Our Love End
7. You Are The Music
8. Good Love
9. Dat's It
10. Send Me No More Letters (US single version)

== Personnel ==
- Dave Holland: Drums, percussion (1–10)
- Glenn Hughes: Bass guitar, six-string guitar, piano, trombone, lead vocals (1–10)
- Mel Galley: Lead & bass guitar, vocals (1–10)
- Terry Rowley: Organ, guitar, piano, flute (1, 10)
- John Jones: Trumpet (1, 10)

=== Additional Musicians ===
- B.J. Cole: Steel guitar (Coast to Coast)
- Rod Argent: Electric piano (Coast to Coast)
- Frank Ricotti: Vibes (Will our Love End)
- Jimmy Hastings: Alto (Will our Love End)
