= Way Back to the Bone =

Compilation album by Trapeze
- Released: October 1986
- Recorded: 1970–1972
- Genre: Hard rock
- Length: Vinyl LP: 45.45
- Label: Bandit
- Producer: John Lodge, Neil Slaven

Trapeze chronology
Live in Texas: Dead Armadillos (1981)	Way Back to the Bone (1986)	Welcome to the Real World (1992)

Professional ratings
Review scores
Source	Rating
Allmusic	4.5/5 stars

Way Back to the Bone is a compilation album by the band Trapeze of previously released material from 1970 to 1972. It features songs from the original line-up of Mel Galley, Glenn Hughes & Dave Holland.

== Track listing ==
=== Side one ===
1. "Coast To Coast" – 4:02
2. "Loser" – 4:45
3. "Your Love Is Alright" – 4:54
4. "Touch My Life" – 4:06
5. "Way Back To The Bone" – 5:30

==== Side two ====
1. "Seafull" – 6:34
2. "Black Cloud" – 6:13
3. "You Are The Music" – 5:21
4. "Medusa" – 5:40

== Personnel ==
- Dave Holland – Drums
- Glenn Hughes – Bass Guitar, Lead Vocals
- Mel Galley – Lead Guitar, Vocals
