= Phenom =

Phenom may refer to:

- AMD Phenom, the 64-bit AMD desktop processor line based on the K10 microarchitecture
  - Phenom II, a family of AMD's multi-core 45 nm processors using the AMD K10 microarchitecture
- Phenom (electron microscope), a fast electron microscope
- Phenom (rock group), a progressive rock group from Bangalore, India
- "Phenom" (song), a song by American rapper Xzibit
- Phenom (TV series), an American sitcom
- Embraer Phenom, a line of Brazilian light jet aircraft
- The Phenom, a 2015 sports drama film starring Ethan Hawke
- The Undertaker (born 1965; aka "The Phenom"), retired American professional wrestler
- Vitor Belfort (born 1977; aka "The Phenom"), Brazilian mixed martial artist

== See also ==
- Phenomena (disambiguation)
