= Live at the Boat Club 1975 =

Live at the Boat Club

Live album by Trapeze
- Released: 2006
- Recorded: Sep 13, 1975
- Genre: Hard rock
- Length: around 70 minutes
- Label: Major League Productions (MLP)

Trapeze chronology
Hot Wire (1974)	Live at the Boat Club (2006)	Trapeze (1975)

Professional ratings
Review scores
Source	Rating
AllMusic	3.5/5 stars
CDconnection	
Barnes and Noble	

Live at the Boat Club 1975 is a live album by the British rock band Trapeze, recorded on 13 September 1975 at the Boat Club in Nottingham for a UK radio broadcast and released in 2006. It features tracks from their four mid-1970s albums Medusa (1970), You Are the Music...We're Just the Band (1972), Hot Wire (1974), and Trapeze (1975). The CD release includes a 12-page booklet with rare photographs, a band biography, and liner notes by guitarist Mel Galley.

== Track listing ==
1. "Back Street Love" – 5:13
2. "You Are the Music" – 5:19
3. "Jury" – 13:59
4. "Star Breaker" – 3:37
5. "Way Back to the Bone" – 9:44
6. "Medusa" – 8:07
7. "Black Cloud" – 15:30
8. "Sunny Side of the Street" – 2:58
9. "The Raid" – 3:55

== Trapeze ==
- Mel Galley – guitars, lead vocals
- Rob Kendrick – guitars
- Pete Wright – bass
- Dave Holland – drums, percussion
- Terry Rowley – synthesizer
