= Natural Avenue =

Studio album by John Lodge
- Released: 28 January 1977
- Recorded: 1976
- Studio: Threshold Studios, London; mixed at Sunset Sound, Los Angeles
- Genre: Rock
- Length: 45:26 (album); 49:28 (Original CD); 53:45 (Reissue CD)
- Label: Threshold/Decca
- Producer: Tony Clarke

John Lodge chronology
Blue Jays (1975)	Natural Avenue (1977)	10,000 Light Years Ago (2015)

Professional ratings
Review scores
Source	Rating
Allmusic	3/5 stars
Prog	3.5/5 stars

Natural Avenue is the debut solo album by John Lodge of The Moody Blues, released in 1977 during the Moody Blues' five-year hiatus. During the five years, Lodge also collaborated with Justin Hayward for an album titled Blue Jays. While Natural Avenue was not a major hit, the album fared slightly better than Hayward's release of Night Flight three years later. Music critic Robert Hillburn gave the album a favourable review in the Los Angeles Times. The album's cover features artwork by English artist Roger Dean.

The album was originally released on the London label in 1977. It was subsequently re-released on CD on the Threshold label in 1987. This release included one bonus track, "Street Café" (originally released as a single in 1980).

It was released yet again on Threshold in May 1996, with the additional bonus track "Threw It All Away" (the B-side of the "Street Café" single).

== Track listing ==
All tracks composed by John Lodge

=== Side 1 ===
1. "Intro to Children of Rock 'n' Roll" – 1:04
2. "Natural Avenue" – 3:56
3. "Summer Breeze" – 5:22
4. "Carry Me" – 5:42
5. "Who Could Change" – 6:04

=== Side 2 ===
1. "Broken Dreams, Hard Road" – 4:33
2. "Piece of My Heart" – 3:56
3. "Rainbow" – 3:53
4. "Say You Love Me" – 6:25
5. "Children of Rock 'n' Roll" – 4:31

=== 1987 CD Bonus Track ===
11. "Street Café" – 4:02

=== 1996/2014 Reissue CD Bonus Tracks ===
11. "Street Café" – 4:02
12. "Threw It All Away" – 4:17
- Both "Street Café" and "Threw It All Away" produced by Pip Williams.

== Personnel ==
- John Lodge – 6- and 12-string acoustic guitars (1–7, 9, 10), bass (2–10), harmonica (2), piano (5), vocals
- Steve Simpson – Spanish guitar (1, 9), 6-string acoustic guitars (1, 3–6, 10), electric guitar (2, 6), vocals
- Chris Spedding – electric guitar (5, 7–10)
- Mick Weaver – piano & organ (2–6, 8–10), electric piano (7), celeste (7)
- Kenney Jones – drums & percussion (2–10)
- Jimmy Jewell – saxophone (3, 6)
- Mel Collins – soprano saxophone (2)
- Martin Dobson – alto saxophone (2)
- Brian Rogers Orchestra – (3–10)
- Dennis Lopez – percussion (5)
- Gary Osborne – vocals
- John Richardson – vocals
- Allan Williams – vocals
- Billy Lowrie – vocals

== Charts ==
Chart (1977)	Peak position
UK Albums (OCC)	38
US Billboard 200	121
