= Richard Bailey =

Richard Bailey may refer to:

- Richard Bailey (historian) (born 1947), historian of African American history in Alabama
- Richard Eugene Bailey, creator of Hughes Television Network in 1956
- Richard J. Bailey, American politician
- Richard W. Bailey (1939–2011), American linguist
- Richard William Bailey (1885–1957), British mechanical engineer and research engineer
- Richard Bailey, convicted for a series of horse killings and involvement in the murder of heiress Helen Brach
- Richard Bailey, keyboardist with the band Trapeze
- Richard Bailey (politician), mayor of Coronado, California, 2016–2024
- Richard Bailey, drummer for Jeff Beck
- Rick Bailey (born 1954), American rugby union player

== See also ==
- Ricky Bailey (born 1997). English rugby league and rugby union player
