= Running (Trapeze album) =

Studio album by Trapeze
- Released: 1978
- Genre: Hard rock
- Length: 34:25
- Label: Shark Records, Germany
- Producer: Trapeze, Jimmy Miller

Trapeze chronology
| Trapeze (1976) | Running (1978) | Live in Texas: Dead Armadillos (1981) |

Professional ratings
Review scores
| Source | Rating |
|---|---|
| The Encyclopedia of Popular Music | 3/5 stars |

Running is an album by the British hard rock band Trapeze. It was originally released only in Germany in 1978. A re-sequenced version with a different cover and title Hold On was later released in the U.K. and other countries in 1979 and in the U.S. market in 1980.

It is the only Trapeze studio album to feature vocalist Pete Goalby.

== Track listing ==
1. "Running"
2. "Living On Love"
3. "Don't Ask Me How I Know"
4. "Take Good Care Of Me"
5. "Time Will Heal"
6. "Hold On"
7. "Don't Break My Heart"
8. "When You Get To Heaven"
9. "You Are"

== Personnel ==
Trapeze

- Mel Galley – guitars, vocals
- Dave Holland – drums, percussion
- Pete Goalby – lead vocals, guitar
- Pete Wright – bass
- Terry Rowley – keyboards, string arrangements
