= Phenomena (disambiguation) =

Phenomena (sing. phenomenon) are observable events.

Phenomena or phenomenon may also refer to:

== Science ==
- Electrical phenomena
- List of geological phenomena
- Optical phenomena
- Social phenomenon

=== Ancient Greek astronomy ===
- The Phenomena, a (now lost) treatise on astronomy by Eudoxus of Cnidus
- The Phenomena, a poem by Aratus based on Eudoxus' treatise
- The Phenomena, a treatise by Euclid on spherical geometry related to astronomy

== Film ==
- Phenomena (film), a 1985 horror film by Italian director Dario Argento starring Jennifer Connelly
- Phenomenon (film), a 1996 film starring John Travolta and Forest Whitaker
- Phenomenon II, a 2003 made-for-television remake of the 1996 film
- The Phenomenon (2020 film), a documentary on UFOs by James Fox

== Television ==
- Phenomenon (TV program), a 2007 American reality television program that aired on NBC
- "The Phenomenon" (Smash), a 2013 episode of the American television series Smash

== Music ==
- Phänomene, a waltz composed by Johann Strauss II
- Phenomena (band), a multi-media rock music project conceived by Tom Galley
  - Phenomena (Phenomena album)
- Phenomena (Planetshakers album), 2002
- "Phenomena" (song), a 2006 song by the Yeah Yeah Yeahs
- Phenomena (Audiomachine album), 2014
- Phenomenon (UFO album), 1974
- Phenomenon (LL Cool J album), 1997
  - "Phenomenon" (LL Cool J song)
- Phenomenon (Thousand Foot Krutch album), 2003
  - "Phenomenon" (Thousand Foot Krutch song)
- Phenomenon (Monsta X album), 2019
- "Phenomenon", a song by The Black Eyed Peas from The Beginning
- "Phenomenon", a song by Limp Bizkit on their 2003 album Results May Vary
- "Phenomenon", a song by TobyMac from Welcome to Diverse City
- Phenomena (Within the Ruins album), 2014
- The Phenomenon 1968–1998, a 1998 greatest hits album by Demis Roussos

== Other uses ==
- Ronaldo (Brazilian footballer) (b. 1976), association football player known as "The Phenomenon"
- Phenomena (Amiga demogroup), the name of a Demogroup producing Amiga demos
- Phaenomena Aratea (disambiguation)

== See also ==
- Phenomenal (disambiguation)
- Phenomenology (disambiguation)
