= Providence (band) =

American Rock Band

- Origin: Boise, Idaho / Portland, Oregon, United States
- Years active: 1971–1974
- Label: Threshold
- Members: Bart Bishop; Bob Barriatua; Jim Cockey; Andy Guzie; Tim Tompkins; Tom Tompkins

Providence was an American six-piece rock band, active from 1971 to 1974. The group originated in Boise, Idaho, but was later based in Portland, Oregon. The Moody Blues signed Providence to a recording contract with Threshold. They released one album, Ever Sense the Dawn, in 1972.

== Band members ==
- Bob Barriatua - electric bass, vocals
- Bart Bishop - lead vocals, piano, harpsichord, organ, autoharp
- Jim Cockey - violin, glockenspiel, vocals
- Andy Guzie - guitars, vocals
- Tim Tompkins - cello, vocals, recorders, percussion
- Tom Tompkins - viola, vocals, occasional violin.

== Musical style ==
The style of the group was soft rock with classical influences, particularly in contrapuntal instrumental interludes by their string trio and in broad vocal harmonies that followed strict rules of voice-leading.

Providence was an impressive live unit that drew heavily on the combined power of Barriatua's bass and Tompkins' cello, the two instruments combining to create a rock edge that could be quite intense. Layered on top of that were Tompkins' viola and Cockey's violin. Guzie's guitar work was often treated as a lyrical embellishment more than the blistering leads of his rock contemporaries of the period. Lead singer and main writer Bartholomew Bishop's keyboards centered on piano, organ and harpsichord, rather than the Moog, ARP and other synthesizers then in common use among groups exploring a mixture of rock and classical influences. Because of their string trio, the group did not use the popular Mellotron (which the Moody Blues popularized in songs such as "Nights in White Satin"), giving Providence a sound that was quite organic and more complex than that created by the Mellotron.

== After breakup ==
Following the band's breakup, individual members went on to a wide range of professional activities.

Cockey and the Tompkins brothers lent their talents to the duet album Blue Jays (1975) by the Moodies' Justin Hayward and John Lodge. They also became part of the Bluejays touring band for the 1975 UK tour, and in 1977 they appeared on Justin Hayward's solo album Songwriter.

Barriatua completed an M.D. degree and established a practice in Portland.

Cockey completed a degree in composition at University of Oregon under Hal Owen and has since established himself as a composer and music teacher working out of McCall, Idaho.

Andy (now known as Andrew) Guzie completed a classical guitar degree from the University of Oregon and continues to work as a performing guitarist in Portland.

Tim and his wife Frances Tompkins have been composing and performing music together for 40 years. He appeared on the 1995 recording Freelight, which also featured former Moody Blues keyboardist and vocalist Michael Pinder. Tom Tompkins has worked as principal violist with the Boise, Idaho symphony, broadened his musical skills to include flute and mandolin, among other instruments, and recorded with a range of artists.

Tom Tompkins with wife Jill established careers as principal string players in the Boise Philharmonic Orchestra. They left their long held positions in 2015.

Rand Bishop is Bart's brother and was the original producer of the Providence demo that drew attention from the Moodies resulting in the signing to Threshold. Rand now works on Music Row in Nashville, Tennessee and has written top sellers for Tim McGraw, Toby Keith and others.

Bart Bishop has perhaps sustained the most visibility in the field of recorded music. He continued working in the recording industry as a vocalist throughout the 1970s, featured on albums by Ted Nugent (Nugent), Allan Clarke former lead singer of the Hollies, Billy Thorpe (Children of the Sun), Carmine Appice/Rick Derringer (Doctors of the Universe), Peter Noone (Herman of Herman's Hermits), The Orchids, The Runaways, Staying Alive soundtrack album (platinum selling status), and Rand Bishop and the Underdogs.

Bartholomew's work as a busy session vocalist and instrumentalist in Hollywood drew the attention of Takoma Records Denny Bruce in 1981 and Bart wrote produced and performed the Takoma records release The Roulettes, a pop rock project of his own. In recent years Bart had gone back to using his original stage name of "Bartholomew" and was in production of a new album that focused on his folk-classical musical roots. The new project, tentatively titled Three Cornered Hat, was produced by brother Theo Bishop at Native Language Studios in the Los Angeles area, with a tentative release in 2008. It was to feature the string arrangements and performances of another brother, Jayson Bishop, on cello and string bass, as well as Theo's keyboard work. The brothers entertained distribution opportunities around the world, particularly to accommodate a European tour scheduled for summer 2009, along with Bart's son Graham's act, "Senors of Marseille".

In another familial collaboration, Theo and yet another brother, Greg, produced and released the CD Fly Brother Fly in 1998. Greg is a flutist and vocalist with roots in classical, pop, rock, world music and jazz. Fly Brother Fly has been described as "An exotic, cinematic blend of stellar flute-driven music that transports, soothes, heals, and uplifts through many styles including contemporary jazz, new age, and lush vocal pop." Greg says much of his inspiration for becoming a musician came from watching Providence rehearse at their home in Boise.

Theo has been active as a composer and performer, scoring TV shows and movies and lending his skills to many rock, blues and jazz groups throughout southern California. He has produced three CDs as a jazz pianist: One Man's Dream, Newport Nights, and Time to Think (2013). He has also produced several other artists from his Southern California Studio. Theo has written and produced some of smooth jazz's top songs and performed with some of its brightest stars. He has recorded and/or played live with Jeff Kashiwa, Steve Oliver, Dave Hooper of the Rippingtons, Tony Guerrero, Rob Mullins, Juan Carlos Quintero, Brian Hughes, Jimmie Haslip and Will Kennedy from the Yellow Jackets.

The members of Providence reunited in 2007 to autograph rare copies of their original Ever Sense the Dawn Threshold Records release for fans and friends in Europe.

Bart Bishop died on 19 October 2009.
