= Play Me Out =

Play Me Out can refer to:

- Play Me Out (Glenn Hughes album)
- Play Me Out (Helen Reddy album)
