= The Final Swing =

Compilation album by Trapeze
- Released: 1974
- Recorded: 1970–1973
- Genre: Hard rock; funk rock; blues rock; psychedelic rock
- Length: 43:38
- Label: Threshold
- Producer: John Lodge, Neil Slaven, Gerry Hoff

Trapeze chronology
You Are the Music...We're Just the Band (1972)	The Final Swing (1974)	Hot Wire (1974)

The Final Swing is a compilation album by English hard rock band Trapeze. Released in 1974 by Threshold Records, it features tracks from the band's first three albums, Trapeze, Medusa and You Are the Music...We're Just the Band, as well as two new tracks produced by Gerry Hoff.

== Background ==
The Final Swing features one track from Trapeze's 1970 self-titled debut album Trapeze, three tracks from the band's 1970 second album Medusa, three tracks from the band's 1972 third album You Are the Music...We're Just the Band, and two previously unreleased tracks. The two new tracks – "Good Love" and "Dats It" – were performed by band members Glenn Hughes, Mel Galley and Dave Holland, along with pianist Jean Roussel, and produced by Gerry Hoff.

== Reception ==
Professional ratings
Review scores
Source	Rating
AllMusic	2/5 stars

Despite Trapeze, Medusa and You Are the Music...We're Just the Band receiving at least four out of five stars each, The Final Swing was awarded two out of five stars by music website AllMusic, although no review was posted.

The album did, however, provide Trapeze with their first experience of chart success, reaching number 172 on the US Billboard 200 upon its release.

== Track listing ==
No.	Title	Writer(s)	Original release	Length
1.	"Send Me No More Letters"	Terry Rowley	Trapeze	4:51
2.	"Your Love Is Alright"	Mel Galley, Glenn Hughes, Dave Holland	Medusa	4:54
3.	"Black Cloud"	M. Galley, Tom Galley	Medusa	6:13
4.	"Medusa"	Hughes	Medusa	5:40
5.	"Coast to Coast"	Hughes	You Are the Music...We're Just the Band	4:02
6.	"Will Our Love End"	Hughes	You Are the Music...We're Just the Band	5:07
7.	"You Are the Music"	M. Galley, T. Galley	You Are the Music...We're Just the Band	5:21
8.	"Good Love"	Hughes	Previously unreleased	4:20
9.	"Dats It"	M. Galley	Previously unreleased	3:10

== Personnel ==
Trapeze

- Glenn Hughes – bass, piano, vocals
- Mel Galley – guitar
- Dave Holland – drums, percussion
- John Jones – vocals ("Send Me No More Letters")
- Terry Rowley – organ ("Send Me No More Letters")

Production personnel

- John Lodge – production ("Send Me No More Letters", "Your Love Is Alright", "Black Cloud" and "Medusa")
- Neil Slaven – production ("Coast to Coast", "Will Our Love End" and "You Are the Music")
- Gerry Hoff – production ("Good Love" and "Dats It")

Additional musicians

- Jean Roussel – piano and electric piano ("Good Love" and "Dats It")
- B. J. Cole – steel guitar ("Coast to Coast")
- Rod Argent – electric piano ("Coast to Coast")
- Frank Ricotti – vibraphone ("Will Our Love End")
- Jimmy Hastings – alto saxophone ("Will Our Love End")

Additional personnel

- Bob Norrington – design
- Karl Dunn – photography
