= Phenomenology =

Phenomenology may refer to:

== Art ==
- Phenomenology (architecture), based on the experience of building materials and their sensory properties

== Philosophy ==
- Phenomenology (Peirce), a branch of philosophy according to Charles Sanders Peirce (1839–1914)
- Phenomenology (philosophy), a branch of philosophy which studies subjective experiences and a methodology of study founded by Edmund Husserl (1859–1938) beginning in 1900
- The Phenomenology of Spirit (1807), the first mature, and most famous, work of German idealist philosopher G. W. F. Hegel

== Science ==
- Phenomenology (archaeology), the study of cultural landscapes from a sensory perspective
- Phenomenology (physics), the study of phenomena and branch of physics that deals with the application of theory to experiments
- Phenomenology (psychology), the study within psychology of subjective experiences
- Phenomenological quantum gravity, researches experimentally testable theories of quantum gravity
- Phenomenology (sociology), the study within sociology of subjective experiences of concrete social realities
- Phenomenology of religion, the study of the experiential aspect of religion in terms consistent with the orientation of the worshippers
- A phenomenological model

== See also ==
- Phenomena (disambiguation)
- Phenology
- Phrenology
