= Alan Hewitt (musician) =

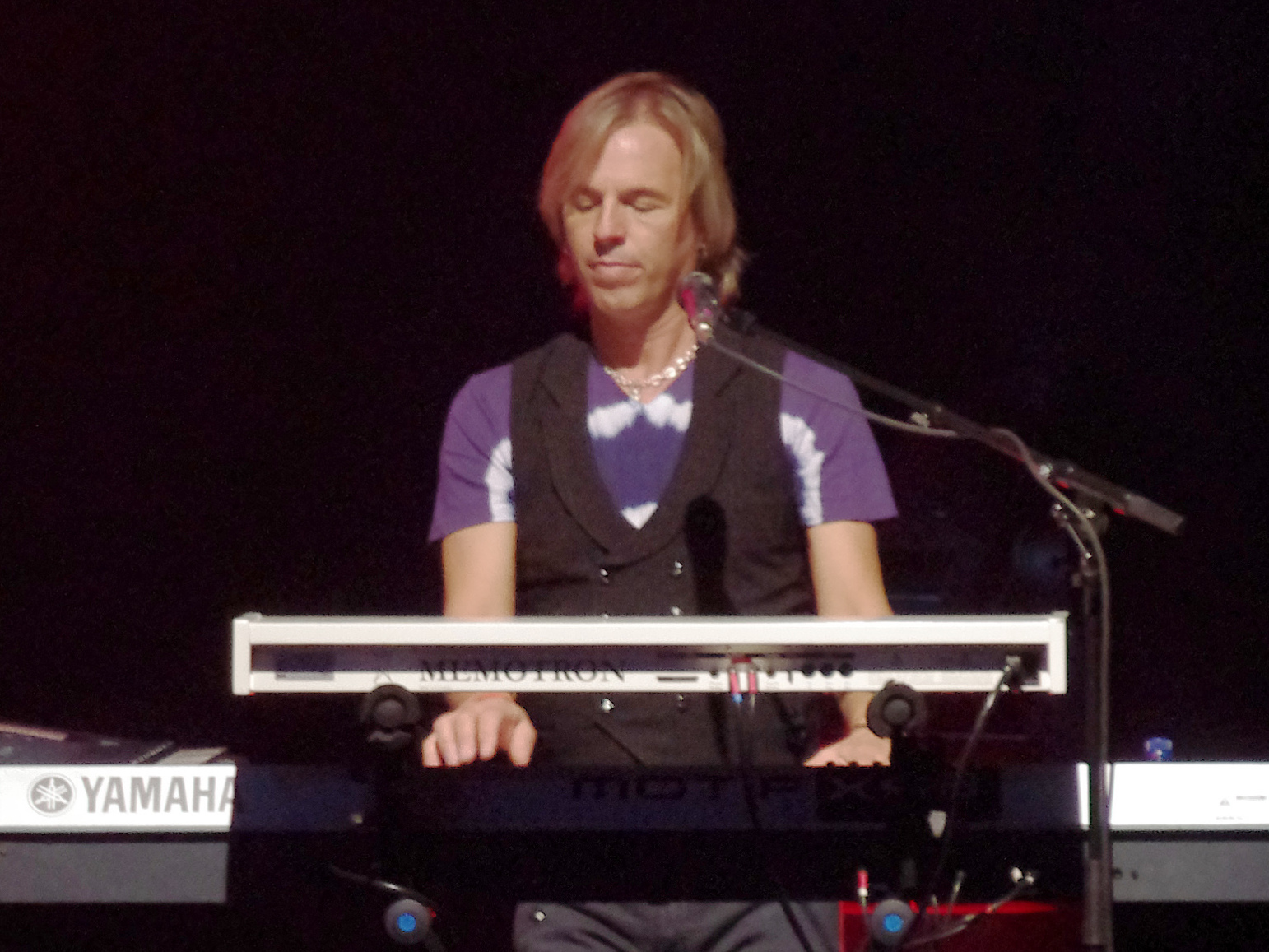
- Hewitt with The Moody Blues in 2013.

Background information
- Origin: Petoskey, Michigan, United States
- Genres: Pop, Rock, Contemporary Jazz
- Occupations: Keyboardist for The Moody Blues, Producer, Songwriter
- Years active: 1982-present
- Label: NuGroove/Sony Red
- Website: AlanHewitt.com, TheNuGroove.com

Alan Hewitt is an American composer, producer, recording and performing artist. He served as keyboardist for The Moody Blues from 2010 until their break up in 2018. Hewitt was born in Petoskey, Michigan, United States, and attended Berklee College of Music graduating in 1978. Hewitt served as a producer for over half a decade alongside Maurice White of Earth Wind and Fire (EWF) with the Greatest Hits album going platinum in 2000. Hewitt performed on the Cherry Pie record with Warrant, which went platinum in 2004.

Hewitt has released multiple solo albums and has written music for movies and television; see below

- Justin Hayward Live at Buckhead
- Alan Hewitt & One Nation Evolution
- John Lodge 10,000 Light Years Ago
- Spirit Rising Vol.2 with Earth, Wind & Fire & Beyonce – Columbia
- Earth, Wind & Fire Greatest Hits
- Earth, Wind & Fire The Promise
- Mary Fahl - co-production/arranging- Sony Classics
- Earth, Wind & Fire Mega Mix

Burning Bush – Co-produced Remix featuring Earth, Wind & Fire – Sony Music That's The Way Of The World “Live” Earth, Wind & Fire- keys- Sony Legacy Warrant: “Cherry Pie” co-writer /arranger/keys- Columbia Godai – Kikuma Music/Japan with Maurice White co-Producer/arranger/keys John Waite: “City By The Sea” – Edgar Allan Poe Society - writer/producer/keys Apollonia Kotero - writer/producer/keys BMG Jonathon Butler: N2Encoded “Lost to Love” Jonathon Butler “I Believe” NCoded. Donny Osmond “Eyes Don’t Lie” – Capitol The Morgans: Avex/Warner Tanaka: Avex/Warner Fiona: Atlantic Records

Diajiman Brothers: produced with Maurice White Columbia/Japan Utherworlds-writer/producer/keys Sakurako Mitsui: with Earth, Wind & Fire/Warner Bros. - producer/arranger (Gold in Japan) Gavin Christopher: PANAM/Japan - producer/writer/keys John Trudell: Ark 21/EMI writer/ produced with David Tickle Ann Tickle: Ark 21/EMI with David Tickle (Included on Ark 21/EMI album “Out of the Blue” featuring Sting, Peter Gabriel, Madonna, Seal, Jackson Brown, Julian Lennon and others) Steven Seagal - producer Blake Aaron 215 Records produced/keys The Ducks: (Best unsigned pop band – LA Weekly) produced with Dave Allard “Not Here”: Musical Score for JFK Center writer/producer Steve Oliver / Global Kiss - SOM piano, vibes, marimba Greg Adam’s East Bay Soul - co writer on “Awaken” Steve Oliver/World Citizen-SOM B-3

== Awards ==
Hewitt won ESPY Award and a Golden Planet Award.

== Discography ==
=== Studio albums ===
- 1996 Native Heart
- 2000 Escape From Life
- 2004 Noche de Pasion
- 2006 Metropolis
- 2010 Retroactive
- 2012 High Fidelity
- 2015 Evolution (Alan Hewitt & One Nation)

=== Voyages Series ===
- 1996 Kalahari
- 1996 Amazon Rain Forest
- 1996 Big Sur

=== Compilations, covers ===
- 2008 Symphony in Rock

=== Soundtracks ===
- 2010 Utherworlds

=== Other credits ===
- A Fall From Freedom -PBS.
- San Francisco Ocean Film Festival winner.
- Bridget Jones: The Edge of Reason (Universal) additional score.
- Gods and Generals (Warner Bros.) – arranger/instrumentalist.
- Swimming Upstream.
- Swimming Upstream – composer trailer.
- Held Up.
- She's So Lovely (Universal) – additional music for DVD.
- Happy Gilmore – additional music.
- Phenomenon – additional music.
- National Lampoon's Van Wilder 2: The Rise of Taj –additional music.
- An Owl's Song.
- Plight of the Pilot Whales.
- Shadow of the Red Giants
- Ten Lives “A Feral Cat Odyssey.
- Justin Hayward “Live at Buckhead Theatre” keyboards, backing vocal.

=== Music for television ===
- Saturday Night Live - 2016.
- Taking it Off -Theme.
- Dancing With The Stars.
- ABC Primetime.
- E News Live.
- Twisted Tales Series.
- Good Guys.
- Naked Science.
- Nate Berkus Show.
- Dr. Oz.
- Oprah's Next Chapter.
- Rosie.
- What Would You Do.
- Made.
- Oprah.
- Oprah's Big Give.
- Comedy Central.
- Celebrity Adventure.
- Nature – PBS.
- Survivor – Latin America (season 1).
- The Osbournes.
- Dead Like Me.
- Room Raiders.
- Sky Sports-NFL.
- 24-Fox promo.
- Nature – PBS.
- Bands Reunited – VH1 Series.
- Turks – CBS primetime series.
- Home Improvement.
- Wyland's Ocean World – Animal Planet – 13-part series.
- Nearly Famous.
- Stylemaker.
- Shipmates.
- You've Gotta See This – Fox Sports.
- Reach for the Sky – PBS.
- Wild On – E Channel.
- The Emotional World of Farm Animals-Genesis Award.
- EXTRA.
- Entertainment Tonight.
- True Hollywood.
- The National Enquirer.
- Inside The NFL.
- Best Damn Sports Show.
- General Hospital.
- Kentucky Derby.
- Squigglevision.
- The Rock -promo.
- World News Now.
- Special Delivery.
- Weekend Flash – Playboy.
- Fix My Celebrity Life.
- TV Guide Magazine Top 25 Best.
- The Good Guys.
- Zhi Qiang Ji Jin Wang-series in Hong Kong.
- World Watch-Japan.
- Yummy Yummy-Singapore.
- NFL Total Access.
- My Super Sweet Sixteen-UK.
- Transformers Prime.
- Sonic X.
- Justice League.
- Clean House.
- Super Soul Sunday.
- New Adventures of Nanobo.
- World's Deadliest.
- Super Soul Sunday.
- Queen Latifah Show.
- Little Couple.
- Oprah Where Are They Now ?
