= Phenomena (Phenomena album) =

Studio album by Phenomena
- Released: 21 June 1985
- Recorded: 1983–85
- Genres: Hard rock; AOR
- Length: 37:34
- Label: Bronze
- Producer: Tom Galley

Phenomena chronology
Phenomena (1985)	Phenomena II: Dream Runner (1987)

Singles from Phenomena
- 1. "Dance with the Devil" Released: 14 June 1985

Professional ratings
Review scores
Source	Rating
AllMusic	3.5/5 stars
Kerrang!	4/5 stars

Phenomena is the 1985 debut album by the English rock project Phenomena. Devised by producer and songwriter Tom Galley, a keen fan of horror films and literature, Phenomena is a loose concept album about various supernatural and paranormal phenomena, including spontaneous human combustion ("Phoenix Rising"), demonic possession and exorcism ("Believe") and the Angels of Mons ("Hell on Wings"). A science-fiction horror film based on the album (not to be confused with the Dario Argento film of the same name) was planned but never progressed beyond the completion of a script and several pieces of concept art.

A follow-up album that featured many of the same contributing musicians but abandoned much of the horror concept, Phenomena II: Dream Runner, was released in 1987.

== Track listing ==
Side one
No.	Title	Writer(s)	Length
1.	"Kiss of Fire"	Tom Galley; Richard Bailey	4:57
2.	"Still the Night"	Glenn Hughes; Pat Thrall; Paul Delph	3:25
3.	"Dance with the Devil"	T. Galley; Mel Galley; Richard Bailey	4:43
4.	"Phoenix Rising"	T. Galley; M. Galley; Bailey	4:45

Side two
No.	Title	Writer(s)	Length
1.	"Believe"	T. Galley; Bailey	5:53
2.	"Who's Watching You"	T. Galley; M. Galley	3:40
3.	"Hell on Wings"	T. Galley; M. Galley; Bailey	3:54
4.	"Twilight Zone"	T. Galley; Bailey	4:13
5.	"Phenomena"	T. Galley; Paul Robbins	2:04

== Personnel ==
Main musicians

- Glenn Hughes – lead vocals (1–8), bass guitar (2, 6)
- Mel Galley – guitars (2–4, 6–8), backing vocals (6)
- John Thomas – guitars (1–3, 5–8)
- Neil Murray – bass guitar (1, 3–5, 7–8)
- Cozy Powell – drums (1, 3–5, 7–8)
- Ted McKenna – drums (2, 6)
- Richard Bailey – keyboards (1, 3–5, 7–9)
- Robin Smith – keyboards (2)
- Don Airey – keyboards (6)

Additional musicians

- Alison McGinnis – backing vocals (1, 3–5, 7–8)
- Pete Green – backing vocals (1–5, 7–8)
- Paul Robbins – backing vocals (8), choral arrangements (9)
- Neil Willars – boy vocal soloist (5, 9)
- Midland Boys Singers – choir vocals (9)
- Ric Sanders – fiddle (3)

Production

- Tom Galley – production, mixing
- Jon Jacobs – mixing, engineering
- Paul Robbins, Dan Priest – engineering

== Charts ==
=== Weekly charts ===
Chart (1985)	Peak position
German Albums (Offizielle Top 100)	52
Swedish Albums (Sverigetopplistan)	30
Swiss Albums (Schweizer Hitparade)	30
UK Albums (Official Charts)	63
