= Blue Jays (album) =

Studio album by Justin Hayward and John Lodge
- Released: 10 March 1975 (US); 14 March 1975 (UK)
- Recorded: June–December 1974
- Studios: Decca Studios, West Hampstead, London
- Genres: Rock; progressive rock
- Length: 47:12 (LP); 50:48 (CD)
- Label: Threshold
- Producer: Tony Clarke

Justin Hayward chronology
Blue Jays (1975)	Songwriter (1977)

John Lodge chronology
Blue Jays (1975)	Natural Avenue (1977)

Singles from Blue Jays
- 1. "I Dreamed Last Night" Released: April 1975; 2. "Blue Guitar" Released: September 1975

Professional ratings
Review scores
Source	Rating
AllMusic	4.5/5 stars

Blue Jays is the only album by Justin Hayward and John Lodge, released in 1975. It was recorded and released during the Moody Blues' five-year hiatus.

== History ==
During work on the Moody Blues album that was to follow Seventh Sojourn, bandmates Lodge, Mike Pinder, Ray Thomas and Graeme Edge summoned Hayward and producer Tony Clarke out of a recording session to call off the project. The tension-fraught recording of Seventh Sojourn and subsequent world tour had left the band exhausted and relationships frayed. Pinder, who had emigrated to the United States, was not happy in England and was determined to return home to California. According to Hayward:

I was under a lot of pressure from Decca to come up with something to release. So I actually went to America to do something with Mike [Pinder], between the two of us. Then Tony Clarke and John [Lodge] turned up at Mike's house as well. Mike took me in the other room and said, "I don't want to work with anybody else. I'm out of this project." So then it became me and John and Tony Clarke, and we made an album called Blue Jays.

The album was recorded, between June and December 1974, at Threshold Westlake Audio Studios in West Hampstead, London.

On 10 March 1975 Blue Jays made its debut in the form of a staged playback of the album at Carnegie Hall. Hayward and Lodge wanted to pipe the music into the street, but New York police said they feared a traffic jam. A short tour of the UK followed in November and December 1975. A recording of the 12 December show at Lancaster University, featuring Trapeze members Mel Galley (guitar) and Dave Holland (drums), is included in the 2013 Timeless Flight box set.

"I Dreamed Last Night" reached No. 87 on Canada's RPM Chart, June 28, 1975.

=== Blue Guitar ===
The track "Blue Guitar," originally released as a non-album single credited to Hayward and Lodge in September 1975 but performed by Hayward with the band 10cc, with John Lodge on bass guitar, was added to the album upon its re-release on CD in 1987. Hayward said, "After a couple of years, John and I had made the Blue Jays album and we were looking for something to release to promote it and I remembered this track and I brought it out and played it to John and our producer Tony Clarke. They liked it but thought it needed something so we took it back to our studio and John added some bass onto it and Tony mixed it in a really nice way and anyone who’s interested will notice it's got dual production credits of 10cc and Tony Clarke."

The single stayed in the UK Singles Chart for seven weeks in 1975, peaking at No. 8 on 15 November.

In 2004 the album was remastered and released on CD with the same bonus track.

== Original track listing ==
=== Side One ===
1. "This Morning" (Justin Hayward) – 5:56
2. "Remember Me (My Friend)" (Hayward, John Lodge) – 5:28
3. "My Brother" (Hayward) – 3:28
4. "You" (Lodge) – 4:35
5. "Nights Winters Years" (Hayward) – 3:40

=== Side Two ===
1. "Saved by the Music" (Lodge) – 6:09
2. "I Dreamed Last Night" (Hayward) – 4:29
3. "Who Are You Now" (Hayward) – 2:29
4. "Maybe" (Lodge) – 5:38
5. "When You Wake Up" (Hayward, Lodge) – 5:23

=== 1987 Bonus track (also 2004 remastered release) ===
11. "Blue Guitar" (Hayward) – 3:37

== Personnel ==
- Justin Hayward – guitar, vocals
- John Lodge – bass, guitar, vocals, pipe organ on "Maybe"
- Jim Cockey – violin, French horn
- Tim Tompkins – cello
- Tom Tompkins – viola
- Kirk Duncan – piano
- Graham Deakin – drums

=== "Blue Guitar" ===
- Justin Hayward – guitar, lead vocals, music & lyrics
- John Lodge – bass guitar
- 10cc:
  - Graham Gouldman - acousic guitar, vocals
  - Lol Creme – slide guitar, vocals
  - Kevin Godley – drums, vocals
  - Eric Stewart – guitar, vocals

== Charts ==
Chart (1975)	Peak position
Australian Albums (Kent Music Report)	26
Canada Top Albums/CDs (RPM)	19
Dutch Albums (Album Top 100)	13
Finnish Albums (The Official Finnish Charts)	17
New Zealand Albums (RMNZ)	12
Norwegian Albums (VG-lista)	16
UK Albums (Official Charts)	4
US Billboard 200	16

== Certifications ==
Region	Certification	Certified units/sales
United Kingdom (BPI)	Gold	100,000^{^}
^{^} Shipments figures based on certification alone.
