= 10,000 Light Years Ago =

Studio album by John Lodge
- Released: 5 May 2015
- Recorded: 2014–2015
- Genre: Rock
- Length: 31:26
- Label: Esoteric Antenna

John Lodge chronology
Natural Avenue (1977)	10,000 Light Years Ago (2015)

10,000 Light Years Ago was the second solo album by John Lodge of The Moody Blues, released in May 2015.

The album is Lodge's first since Natural Avenue (1977). Musicians on the album include founding Moody Blues members Mike Pinder and Ray Thomas (on the song "Simply Magic") as well as guitarist Chris Spedding who also appeared on Natural Avenue.

== Track listing ==
All tracks are written by John Lodge

No.	Title	Length
1.	"In My Mind"	4:53
2.	"Those Days in Birmingham"	3:17
3.	"Simply Magic"	2:44
4.	"Get Me Out of Here"	3:55
5.	"Love Passed Me By"	3:24
6.	"(You Drive Me) Crazy"	2:38
7.	"Lose Your Love"	4:01
8.	"10,000 Light Years Ago"	4:55

== Personnel ==
- John Lodge – bass, guitar, vocals
- Chris Spedding – guitar
- Mike Pinder – mellotron on "Simply Magic"
- Ray Thomas – flute on "Simply Magic"
- Alan Hewitt – keyboards, vocals
- Brian Howe – vocals
- Brian Price – guitar
- Gordon Marshall – drums, percussion
- John Defaria – guitar
- Norda Mullen – flute
- Mike Piggott – violin

== Charts ==
Chart (2015)	Peak position
UK Independent Albums (OCC)	43
