= Phenomenal (disambiguation) =

To be phenomenal is to occur observably.

- "Phenomenal" (song), a 2015 song by Eminem
- "Phenomenal", a song by Janelle Monáe from The Age of Pleasure, 2023
- Phénoménal, a 1998 compilation album by French musician Lord Kossity
- Phenomenal Smith (1864–1952), American baseball player
- The Phenomenal One, a nickname for professional wrestler A.J. Styles

== See also ==
- Phenomena (disambiguation)
