= Embraer Phenom =

Embraer Phenom may refer to:

- Embraer Phenom 100, a 4-6 passenger very light jet aircraft
- Embraer Phenom 300, a 6-8 passenger light jet aircraft
