= Trapeze (1970 album) =

Studio album by Trapeze
- Released: May 1970
- Recorded: 1969
- Studio: Morgan Studios and Decca Studios (London, England)
- Genre: Progressive rock; psychedelic rock; pop rock
- Length: 40:11
- Label: Threshold
- Producer: John Lodge

Trapeze chronology
Trapeze (1970)	Medusa (1970)

Singles from Trapeze
- 1. "Send Me No More Letters" Released: 21 November 1969

Trapeze is the debut studio album by British rock band Trapeze. Recorded in 1969 at Morgan Studios and Decca Studios, it was produced by the Moody Blues bassist John Lodge and released in May 1970 as the second album on Threshold Records, a record label founded by Lodge's band. Trapeze is the band's only album to feature founding member John Jones (vocals, trumpet); both he and Terry Rowley (organ, piano, flute) left shortly after its release. (Rowley rejoined in 1974.)

Unlike the band's later material, which was primarily categorised as blues and hard rock, Trapeze has been described by commentators as a progressive or psychedelic rock album, owing partly to the presence of brass instruments and keyboards on the album. Songwriting was typically led by Jones, Galley and Hughes, with Rowley also co-writing two tracks. "Send Me No More Letters" was released as the only single from the album in 1969, backed with fellow album track "Another Day".

== Background and release ==
Trapeze was formed in March 1969 by former The Montanas members John Jones (vocals, trumpet) and Terry Rowley (organ, guitar, piano, flute), along with former Finders Keepers members Mel Galley (guitar, vocals), Glenn Hughes (bass, piano, vocals) and Dave Holland (drums). The five-piece recorded their self-titled debut album later in the year at London's Morgan Studios and Decca Studios. The recordings were produced by John Lodge, whose band the Moody Blues had earlier signed Trapeze as the first act to their new record label Threshold Records. "Send Me No More Letters" was released as a single in 1969, and Trapeze was released in May 1970. The album was the band's only release to feature Jones and Rowley, both of whom left shortly after its release to return to The Montanas.

== Composition and style ==
The material featured on Trapeze was primarily written by Galley, Hughes and Jones – Galley was credited on seven tracks, Hughes and Jones on five each, and Rowley on two. Despite being the band's primary vocalist, Jones was only credited with trumpet on the album, with Hughes being credited for all vocals on the release. The style of the album has been described by commentators as a mix between progressive rock, psychedelic rock and pop rock, with AllMusic's Bruce Eder claiming that "Those listeners who only know the subsequent albums by Trapeze may be surprised by this debut effort" due to their later hard rock style. The album was compared stylistically to the work of other British rock acts of the period, including Lodge's band the Moody Blues and Hughes's future group Deep Purple (particularly the first three albums). In the liner notes for a 2004 reissue of the album by Lemon Recordings, journalist Nigel Williamson described Trapeze as "a classic period example of English prog, mixing pastoral whimsy, swirling psychedelia, rock guitars and pop harmonies". Similarly, Eder identified that the album featured an array of "lush choruses, psychedelic interludes, and hook-laden romantic ballads", amounting to "high-energy music within the context of psychedelic pop/rock".

== Critical reception ==
Professional ratings
Review scores
Source	Rating
AllMusic	4/5 stars

Media response to Trapeze was generally positive. Eder praised the performances of the "core trio" of Galley, Hughes and Holland, who he claimed "[found] a good compromise with Rowley and Jones' more lyrical, psychedelic pop sensibilities", but noted that "it's clear that three of these musicians are holding back to one degree or another in these surroundings". He also highlighted "Fairytale" and "Am I" as the album's standout songs, which he claimed "[pointed] the way to [the band's] future sound" following their reduction to the aforementioned trio. Billboard hailed Trapeze as "a candidate for big chart action", praising the performance in particular of Hughes, highlighting "Send Me No More Letters" and "Fairytale", and praising the band's "strong rock personality" on the record.

== Track listing ==
No.	Title	Writer(s)	Length
1.	"It's Only a Dream"	Mel Galley	0:42
2.	"The Giant's Dead Hoorah!"	Glenn Hughes	3:32
3.	"Over"	John Jones; Galley	3:36
4.	"Nancy Gray"	Hughes	2:47
5.	"Fairytale/Verily Verily/Fairytale"	Jones; Galley	7:39
6.	"It's My Life"	Jones; Galley	2:47
7.	"Am I"	Hughes	3:07
8.	"Suicide"	Jones; Galley	4:49
9.	"Wings"	Hughes; Terry Rowley	3:28
10.	"Another Day"	Galley; Hughes; Jones	2:35
11.	"Send Me No More Letters"	Rowley	4:32
12.	"It's Only a Dream (Reprise)"	Galley	0:37

== Personnel ==
- Glenn Hughes – lead vocals, bass, trombone
- Mel Galley – guitars, backing vocals
- Dave Holland – drums
- Terry Rowley – organ, piano, flute
- John Jones – trumpet, co-lead vocals
- John Lodge – production
- Roger Quested – engineering
- Chris Neal – engineering
- Bill Price – engineering
- John Punter – engineering
- David Wedgbury – photography
- Barry Wentzell – photography
