= Trapeze (band) =

English rock band

- Origin: Cannock, England
- Genres: Hard rock; blues rock; funk rock; progressive rock (early)
- Years active: 1969–1982; 1991–1992; 1993–1994
- Labels: Threshold; Warner Bros.; Major League; Castle
- Spinoffs: Phenomena
- Spinoff of: Finders Keepers; The Montanas
- Past members: Mel Galley; Dave Holland; Glenn Hughes; Terry Rowley; John Jones; Pete Wright; Rob Kendrick; Peter Goalby; Steve Bray; Mervyn Spence; Richard Bailey; Kex Gorin; Geoff Downes; Craig Erickson

Trapeze were an English rock band from Cannock, Staffordshire. Formed in 1969, the band originally featured former The Montanas members John Jones (trumpet, vocals) and Terry Rowley (keyboards), and former Finders Keepers members Glenn Hughes (bass, vocals, piano), Mel Galley (guitar, vocals) and Dave Holland (drums). Jones and Rowley left the band following the release of their self-titled debut album in 1970, with the lineup of Hughes, Galley and Holland continuing as a trio. After the release of Medusa later in 1970 and You Are the Music... We're Just the Band in 1972, Hughes left Trapeze in 1973 to join Deep Purple.

Galley and Holland resurfaced with Trapeze a year later, adding second guitarist Rob Kendrick and bassist Pete Wright to the band. Hot Wire was released in late 1974 and a second self-titled album followed in 1975, after which the classic trio briefly reunited for a tour in 1976 when Hughes returned following Deep Purple's breakup. After Hughes left again, Trapeze returned in 1978 with new frontman Peter Goalby, who performed on the band's final album Hold On. Several more lineup changes occurred in the following years, including Holland joining Judas Priest in 1979, before the band broke up in 1982 as Galley joined Whitesnake.

In 1991, Hughes, Galley and Holland reunited Trapeze for a string of tour dates the following year, adding Asia keyboardist Geoff Downes for the shows. The tour resulted in a live album, Welcome to the Real World: Live at the Borderline, which was released in 1998. The trio revived Trapeze again in 1994 with second guitarist Craig Erickson, completing a brief tour early in the year before permanently disbanding.

== History ==
=== 1969–1973: Formation and early releases ===
Trapeze formed in March 1969, with the original lineup featuring former The Montanas members John Jones (trumpet, vocals) and Terry Rowley (keyboards, guitar, flute), along with former Finders Keepers members Glenn Hughes (bass, vocals, piano) Mel Galley (guitar, vocals) and Dave Holland (drums). One of the band's early performances was filmed for an appearance on the BBC2 show Colour Me Pop, recorded on 5 July 1969 at Club Lafayette in Wolverhampton, at which they performed the song "Send Me No More Letters". Local promoter Tony Perry described the show as "one of the most outstanding nights at the [venue]", praising the band's performance as "fantastic". Later in the year, Trapeze signed as the first act on Threshold Records, a record label founded by The Moody Blues and distributed in the United States by London Records and elsewhere by Decca Records. The band reportedly declined an offer to join Apple Records, the label founded by The Beatles, as they believed that they would have more creative freedom with Threshold.

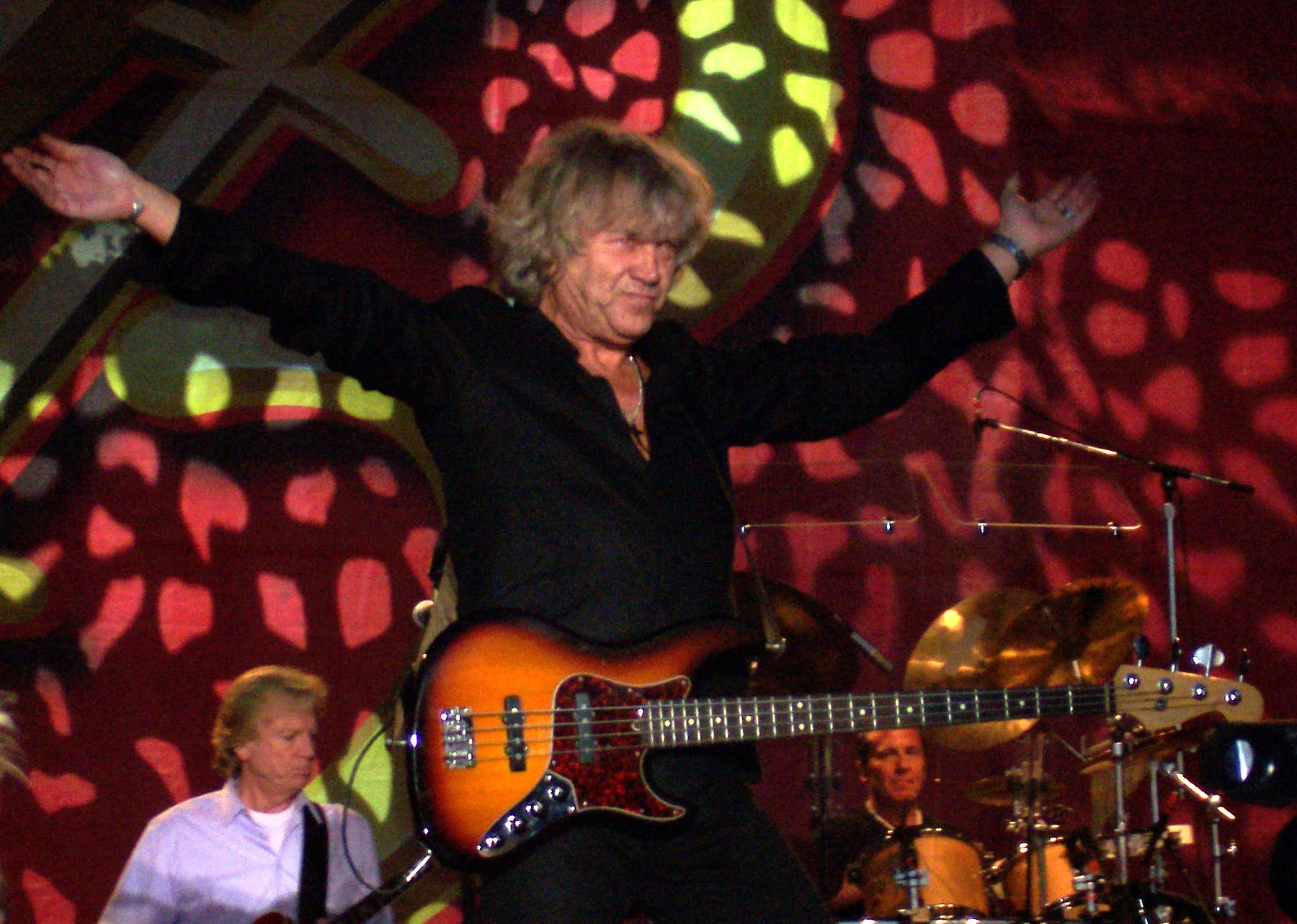
The Moody Blues bassist John Lodge produced the first two albums by Trapeze, 1970's Trapeze and Medusa.

Working with The Moody Blues bassist John Lodge as producer, Trapeze recorded their self-titled debut album at London's Morgan Studios and Decca Studios. Despite Jones being the band's official lead singer, Hughes performed all vocals on the release. Hughes has revealed that he was asked to sing on the album by the group's management, who deemed him to be the better of the two vocalists. Before the end of the year, the Rowley composition "Send Me No More Letters" was released as the band's first single, backed with "Another Day" (written by Galley, Hughes and Jones). Trapeze was released in May 1970. The album was generally well received by critics – Billboard magazine described it as featuring "a strong rock personality" and dubbed it "a candidate for big chart action", while journalist Nigel Williamson hailed it as "a classic period example of English prog, mixing pastoral whimsy, swirling psychedelia, rock guitars and pop harmonies". It also received significant airplay on BBC Radio 1 from DJs such as Bob Harris and Pete Drummond, and was played in full by the station. Trapeze was promoted on a string of shows in the UK between January and July.

In August 1970, Jones and Rowley left Trapeze, returning to The Montanas. Rather than replacing the departed members, Hughes, Galley and Holland continued as a power trio, adopting a style more akin to hard rock and funk rock. On 13 November 1970, the band released their second album Medusa in the UK, which was issued in the US in March 1971. Produced again by Lodge, the album has since been highlighted by multiple critics as the band's best release, as well as one of the decade's most underrated hard rock albums. Writing in the booklet for a 1994 reissue of the album, author John Tracy claimed that Medusa was "greeted with instant, and seemingly universal, acclaim". Ultimate Classic Rock writer Eduardo Rivadavia credited the album for contributing to the early development of the heavy metal genre in 1970. "Black Cloud", written by Galley with brother Tom, was issued in the US as the only single from the album backed with "Your Love Is Alright", written by the three band members.

Trapeze toured extensively in promotion of Medusa, primarily in the US, including a stint in December 1970 supporting The Moody Blues and numerous headline tours throughout 1971, before releasing their third album You Are the Music... We're Just the Band on 1 December 1972. The album was primarily written by Hughes (three tracks were written by the Galley brothers), produced by Neil Slaven, and featured a number of guest contributors including Rod Argent on piano and B. J. Cole on steel guitar. The album marked an increase in softer, more melodic songs since Medusa, which were praised as highlights of the collection by multiple reviewers. Billboard dubbed the album a "fine set", while Tracy described it as "a masterpiece". You Are the Music... We're Just the Band was the first Trapeze album to chart, peaking at number 9 on the US Billboard Bubbling Under chart, which acts as an extension to the Billboard 200. The band toured throughout late 1972 and early 1973 in promotion of the album, including dates in the US and the UK. Prior to a show at the Village East in December 1972, the band's equipment was stolen and they were forced to play using "hastily rented equipment".

=== 1973–1976: Hughes's departure and return ===
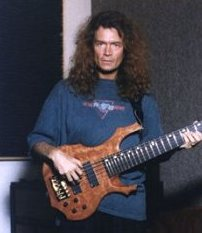
Glenn Hughes left the band in 1973 to join Deep Purple, although briefly returned for a tour in 1976.

In April 1973, Deep Purple members Ritchie Blackmore, Jon Lord and Ian Paice attended a Trapeze show at the Whisky a Go Go in Los Angeles, California, with a view to asking Hughes to replace bassist Roger Glover in the band. When approached at another show the following month, Hughes declined the invitation in favour of remaining with Trapeze, claiming that he was "in a very, very different frame of mind as a musician" at the time and dubbing Deep Purple "too basic rock for me". However, due to the high-profile status of the group at the time, combined with the prospect of working with former Free frontman Paul Rodgers, who had been approached to replace vocalist Ian Gillan, Hughes reconsidered and agreed to join the band as bassist and second vocalist. The lineup change was officially announced in the music magazine Melody Maker on 14 July 1973. Rodgers ultimately passed on the opportunity to join, focusing instead on the formation of Bad Company. David Coverdale was brought in as Gillan's replacement later, after contacting the group in response to the Melody Maker article, which mentioned that they were still looking for a new singer. Hughes has since described the choice to leave Trapeze as a "horrible" one to make, dubbing the band his "family" and claiming in multiple interviews that to some extent he regrets leaving.

After a brief hiatus, Trapeze returned in 1974 with Galley on lead vocals, adding second guitarist Rob Kendrick and bassist Pete Wright to their lineup. In July it was announced that the band had signed with Warner Bros. Records, with a new album slated for release later in the year. Threshold issued the band's first compilation album The Final Swing in October, which featured tracks from their first three albums as well as the previously unreleased "Good Love" and "Dats It". The album was the band's first to chart, entering the US Billboard 200 at number 184 and peaking at number 172. December saw the release of the band's fourth studio album Hot Wire, which peaked at number 146 on the Billboard 200, number 153 on the Cash Box albums chart, and number 161 on the Record World albums chart in early 1975. Former keyboardist Terry Rowley was also featured as a guest contributor on the album, performing synthesizers, organ, electric piano and backing vocals. Rowley remained in the touring lineup of the band for the Hot Wire cycle and featured on the album Live at the Boat Club 1975, although again not credited as a group member.

Later in 1975, Trapeze released a second self-titled album, on which Hughes returned to perform vocals on two tracks. Billboard praised Trapeze as an example of "tight, cooking, soul-tinged hard rock", although AllMusic's Dave Thompson criticised it as "a dour little disc, desperately missing the funk infusions of Glenn Hughes and, for the most part, overshadowed even by its disappointing predecessor". Galley and Holland briefly took a break from Trapeze in November to complete a British concert tour with Justin Hayward and John Lodge, in promotion of their collaboration album Blue Jays, released earlier in the year. The following year, after Deep Purple broke up, Hughes temporarily reunited the classic trio of Trapeze for The Appreciation Tour, which was scheduled to visit the US in August and the UK in September. After a short run of US dates, Hughes left again due to off-stage problems caused by drug abuse, particularly cocaine. Speaking about the brief reunion in 2007, Galley recalled that Hughes "wasn't in a good state of mind at the time", suggesting that "if we could have carried the electricity of those shows on, we could have known no bounds". Similarly, the band's manager Tony Perry has recalled that Hughes "[had] major problems at the time and was very difficult to deal with", adding that he and the other members of the band had discussed the possibility of firing and replacing him during the tour. During their reunion, the trio also recorded a number of new songs, including "L.A. Cut Off" and "Space High", both of which were later released on Hughes's debut solo album Play Me Out in 1977.

=== 1978–1982: Later years and disbandment ===
After Hughes left the band for a second time, Trapeze returned in 1978 with new frontman Peter Goalby and Wright returning on bass. Signing a deal with newly formed label Aura Records, the band released their final studio album Hold On in late 1979, produced by Jimmy Miller. The album, initially released in Germany in 1978 under the title Running with a different track listing, was hailed by Sounds magazine's Graham Neale as the culmination of the band's "obvious regenerated enthusiasm" following recent challenges, while Galley presented it as an evolution in the band's sound and style of songwriting. The album received a positive review from Billboard magazine, which described it as "a noticeably strong ... LP that takes its strength from the tight vocal harmonies and solid original material", suggesting that "Several of the songs included here could become AOR staples". AllMusic's Steve Huey hailed Hold On as "quite possibly [Trapeze]'s best" album, while his colleague Joe Viglione praised it for its songwriting and production qualities.

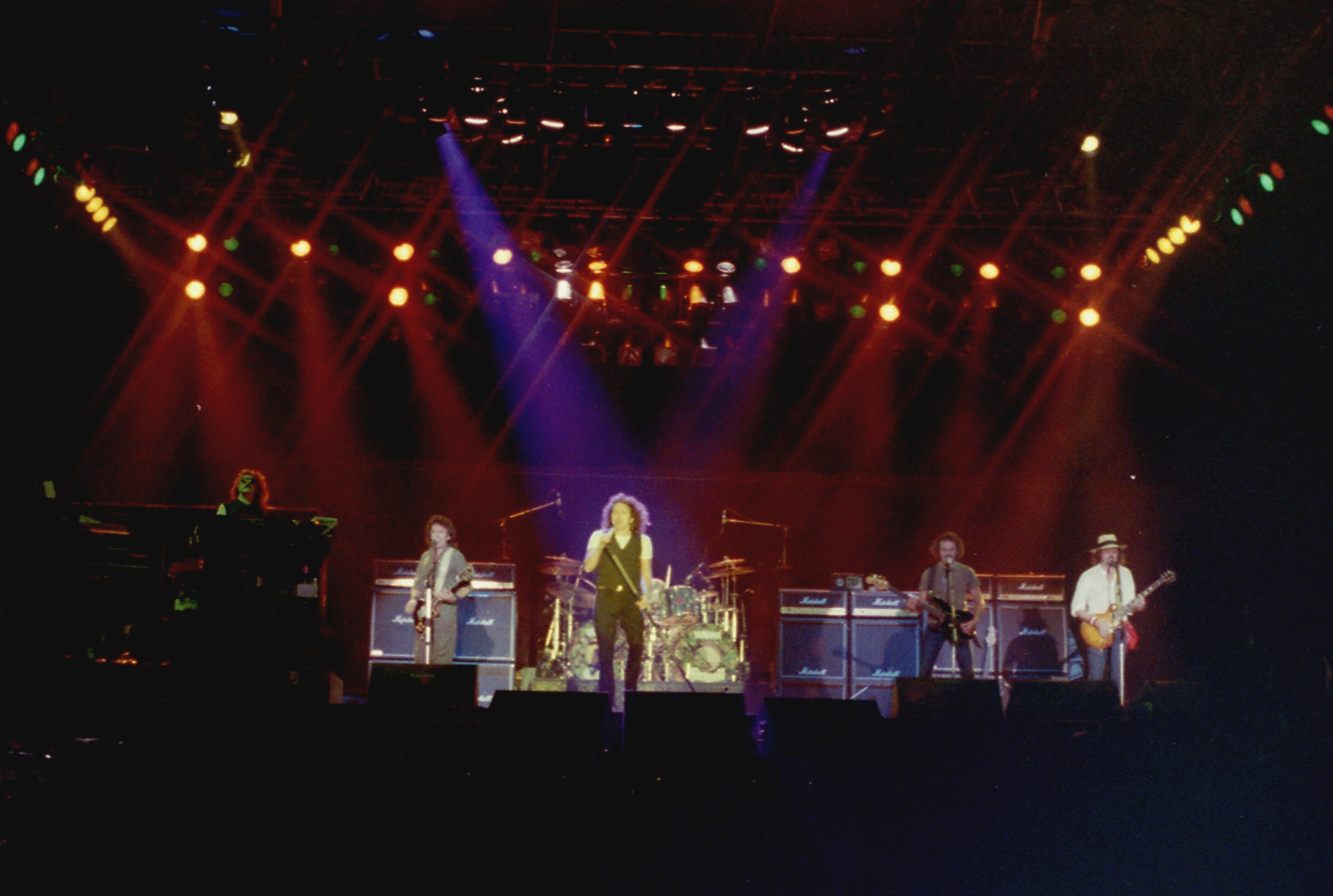
Trapeze broke up in 1982, when Mel Galley – by then, the only remaining original member – joined Whitesnake.

In August 1979, Holland left Trapeze to join heavy metal band Judas Priest. He was replaced later by Steve Bray as the band continued to tour in support of Hold On, including dates with Humble Pie and a stint supporting Scottish band Nazareth alongside Swiss group Krokus. The band released their first live album Live in Texas: Dead Armadillos in 1981, which was recorded on the resulting tour in May 1981. By the time the album was released, Goalby had left Trapeze to join Uriah Heep. Mervyn Spence (bass, lead vocals) and Richard Bailey (keyboards) joined the band later in the year, and in 1982 Bray was replaced by Kex Gorin. Trapeze officially came to an end in late 1982, when Galley joined a new lineup of Whitesnake in time for the Saints & Sinners Tour, which commenced in October. The final lineup of Trapeze had begun recording material for a potential new album before Galley left, with the material later adapted for Whitesnake and Phenomena, a project started by Tom Galley.

=== 1991–1994: Reunions and live releases ===
Hughes, Galley and Holland revived Trapeze in 1991 for a concert tour featuring keyboardist Geoff Downes. On 20 March 1992 they supported Fish at Hammersmith Apollo. In May 1992, the band recorded the live album Welcome to the Real World: Live at the Borderline, which was released in 1998. Another live album, Live: Way Back to the Bone, was released the same year, featuring recordings from earlier in the band's career. The trio reunited again in 1993, recording a number of demos for a planned future release. On 9 February 1994, the band performed at the Irving Plaza in New York City as part of a concert dedicated to vocalist Ray Gillen, who had died on 1 December 1993. This was followed later in the year by a short string of shows in the US and the UK, which Hughes described as a "wonderful run" and a "great experience". The trio were joined for the shows by second guitarist Craig Erickson. Live at the Boat Club 1975 was released in 2006.

== Aftermath ==
Following the release of Live at the Boat Club 1975 in 2006, Trapeze remained inactive, while Hughes continued with his solo career and collaborations with various artists. Mel Galley died of oesophageal cancer on 1 July 2008, and Dave Holland died of lung cancer on 16 January 2018, leaving Glenn Hughes the sole surviving member of the classic lineup.

== Band members ==
- Mel Galley – guitar, vocals (1969–1982, 1991–1992, 1993–1994) (d. 2008)
- Dave Holland – drums, percussion (1969–1979, 1991–1992, 1993–1994) (d. 2018)
- Glenn Hughes – bass, vocals, piano (1969–1973, 1976, 1991–1992, 1993–1994)
- Terry Rowley – synthesizers, keyboards, backing vocals, guitar (1969–1970, 1974–1976)
- John Jones – trumpet, vocals (1969–1970)
- Pete Wright – bass, backing vocals (1974–1976, 1976–1981)
- Rob Kendrick – guitar, backing vocals (1974–1976)
- Peter Goalby – guitar, vocals (1978–1981)
- Steve Bray – drums (1980–1982)
- Mervyn Spence – bass, vocals (1981–1982)
- Richard Bailey – keyboards (1981–1982)
- Kex Gorin – drums (1982)
- Geoff Downes – keyboards (1991–1992)
- Craig Erickson – guitar (1994)

== Discography ==
Studio albums

- Trapeze (1970)
- Medusa (1970, UK; 1971, US)
- You Are the Music...We're Just the Band (1972)
- Hot Wire (1974)
- Trapeze (1975)
- Hold On (1979) / Running (1978, Germany)

Live albums

- Live in Texas: Dead Armadillos (1981)
- Welcome to the Real World: Live at the Borderline (1993)
- Live: Way Back to the Bone (1998)
- Live at the Boat Club 1975 (2006)
- Live In Houston 1972 (2021) RSD release, vinyl double album only
- Live In Houston 1972 (2021) Also available as an MP3 download

Compilations

- The Final Swing (1974)
- Way Back to the Bone (1986)
- High Flyers: The Best of Trapeze (1996)
- On the Highwire (2003)

Singles

- "Send Me No More Letters" (1969)
- "Black Cloud" (1970)
- "Coast to Coast" (1972)
- "On the Sunny Side of the Street" (1975)
- "Don't Ask Me How I Know" (1979)
- "Running Away" (1980)
