= Threshold Records =

Record label

- Parent company: Decca Records, London Records
- Founder: The Moody Blues

Threshold Records was a record label created by the rock music group Moody Blues. The name of the label came from their 1969 album On the Threshold of a Dream.

The band formed this label to allow for artistically packaged gatefold covers for their LP releases, and for releasing band members' solo efforts. Threshold was distributed by Decca Records in the UK and by London Records in the United States.

The first band to be signed up on this label were Westcountry rockers Asgard in 1972 who released two singles from their album, In the Realm of Asgard. Genesis, encouraged by Mike Pinder, also considered signing with the label in 1970. According to Tony Banks, they recorded a version of "Looking for Someone", a song which later appeared on their second album Trespass, but shelved it due to a mistake in the organ performance toward the end which Pinder argued did not demand another take.

Bassist John Lodge produced the band Trapeze for the Threshold label. The rock sextet Providence also recorded for Threshold. After 1976, the Moody Blues went back to having their albums manufactured by Decca Records (and later PolyGram and Universal Records), but the Threshold company and logo were maintained over the years as a means of selling their records through their own record shop in Cobham, Surrey, which closed its doors to the public in February 2011. A Blue plaque was placed on the site on 13 December 2024 by Cobham Heritage.

There was also a Threshold record shop in Swindon, England in the late 1970s.

The Moody Blues subsequent albums, up to and including 1999's Strange Times, were branded 'in association with Threshold Records'.

== Label variations ==
- White label with blue logo in box with "DISTRIBUTED BY LONDON" at top of label
- White label with magenta (singles) or dark purple (albums) logo at top of label
- Blue label with multi-colour logo swirling from the inner edge of the label to the outer edge
- Black logo at bottom of Polydor labels
- Custom labels were also used for some releases, such as The Moody Blues' Long Distance Voyager release.

== Discography ==
- THS-1 The Moody Blues: To Our Children's Children's Children (1969)
- THS-2 Trapeze: Trapeze (1970)
- THS-3 The Moody Blues: A Question of Balance (1970)
- THS-4 Trapeze: Medusa (1970)
- THS-5 The Moody Blues: Every Good Boy Deserves Favour (1971)
- THS-6 Asgard: In the Realm of Asgard (1972)
- THS-7 The Moody Blues: Seventh Sojourn (1972)
- THS-8 Trapeze: You Are the Music...We're Just the Band (1972)
- THS-9 Providence: Ever Sense the Dawn (1972)
- THS-10 Nicky James: Every Home Should Have One (1972)
- THS-11 Trapeze: The Final Swing (1974)
- THS-12/13 The Moody Blues: This Is The Moody Blues (1974)
- THS-14 Justin Hayward & John Lodge: Blue Jays (1975)
- THS-15 The Graeme Edge Band Featuring Adrian Gurvitz: Kick Off Your Muddy Boots (1975)
- THS-16 Ray Thomas: From Mighty Oaks (1975)
- THS-17 Ray Thomas: Hopes, Wishes and Dreams (1976)
- THS-18 Mike Pinder: The Promise (1976)
- THS-19 Nicky James: Thunderthroat (1976)
- TRL-1-2901 The Moody Blues: Long Distance Voyager (1981)
- TRL-1-2902 The Moody Blues: The Present (1983)
- 820155 The Moody Blues: Voices in the Sky: The Best of The Moody Blues (1984)

== See also ==
- List of record labels
