= Hot Wire (Trapeze album) =

Studio album by Trapeze
- Released: September 1974
- Recorded: Island Studios, London and Lee Sound Studios, Birmingham
- Genres: Hard rock; blues rock
- Length: 43:41
- Label: Warner Bros.
- Producers: Neil Slaven, Trapeze

Trapeze chronology
The Final Swing (1974)	Hot Wire (1974)	Trapeze (1975)

Hot Wire is the fourth studio album by English hard rock band Trapeze. Recorded with producer Neil Slaven at Island Studios in London and Lee Sound Studios, Birmingham, it was released in 1974 by Warner Bros. Records.

== Background ==
Hot Wire was the first Trapeze album recorded since the departure of Glenn Hughes in 1973 to join Deep Purple, and the first to feature his replacement Pete Wright, as well as second guitarist Rob Kendrick. It was the second album by the band to be produced by Neil Slaven, and features eight songs written by guitarist and vocalist Mel Galley and his brother Tom (drummer Dave Holland co-wrote one track).

== Reception ==
Professional ratings
Review scores
Source	Rating
AllMusic	3/5 stars

Music website AllMusic awarded Hot Wire three out of five stars. The album was the second by the band to chart on the US Billboard 200, reaching number 146.

== Track listing ==
All tracks are written by Mel Galley and Tom Galley; "Steal a Mile" co-written by Dave Holland.

No.	Title	Length
1.	"Back Street Love"	5:01
2.	"Take It on Down the Road"	4:45
3.	"Midnight Flyer"	6:01
4.	"Wake Up, Shake Up"	3:55
5.	"Turn It On"	5:11
6.	"Steal a Mile"	4:52
7.	"Goin' Home"	5:14
8.	"Feel It Inside"	8:42

== Personnel ==
Trapeze

- Mel Galley – guitar, lead vocals, backing vocals (tracks 3, 5, 6 and 8), slide guitar (track 6), production
- Rob Kendrick – guitar, backing vocals, production
- Pete Wright – bass, backing vocals, production
- Dave Holland – drums, tambourine (track 8), production

Additional musicians

- Terry Rowley – synthesizers and backing vocals (tracks 3, 5, 6 and 7) organ (track 2), electric piano (track 8)
- Kenny Cole – backing vocals (tracks 3, 5, 6 and 8)
- Misty Browning – backing vocals (tracks 3, 5, 6 and 8)
- John Ogden – congas (tracks 2, 3 and 8)
- Chris Mercer – saxophone (tracks 2 and 6)

Production personnel

- Neil Slaven – production
- Rhett Davies – engineering
- Dave Hutchins – engineering assistance
- Don Stewart – engineering assistance
