= You Are the Music... We're Just the Band =

Studio album by Trapeze
- Released: March 1972
- Recorded: June 1971–February 1972
- Studio: Decca, London; Island, London
- Genre: Funk rock; blues rock; hard rock
- Length: 37:52
- Label: Threshold
- Producer: Neil Slaven

Trapeze chronology
Medusa (1970)	You Are the Music... We're Just the Band (1972)	The Final Swing (1974)

Singles from Medusa
- 1. "Coast to Coast" Released: 1 September 1972

You Are the Music... We're Just the Band is the third studio album by British rock band Trapeze. Recorded with producer Neil Slaven, it was released in March 1972 by Threshold Records. The album was followed by the release of the single "Coast to Coast" in September.

== Background ==
You Are the Music...We're Just the Band was the last Trapeze album recorded by the lineup of Glenn Hughes, Mel Galley and Dave Holland, as Hughes left the band in 1973 to join Deep Purple. The album was also the band's first not to be produced by John Lodge, and featured a wide range of guest performers, including guitarist B. J. Cole, pianist Rod Argent and saxophonist Jimmy Hastings. Five of the album's eight songs were written by Hughes, while the other three were written by Galley and his brother Tom.

== Reception ==
Professional ratings
Review scores
Source	Rating
AllMusic	4/5 stars
Variety	(favourable)

Critical reception for You Are the Music...We're Just the Band was generally positive. Variety called the album "another hard-rockin' set by Trapeze".

=== Legacy ===
A retrospective review for AllMusic, Richard Foss praises Hughes's vocal performances and the "softer tunes" of the album. Foss named "Coast to Coast" and "What Is a Woman's Role" as particular highlights.

== Track listing ==
No.	Title	Writer(s)	Length
1.	"Keepin' Time"	Mel Galley, Tom Galley	3:42
2.	"Coast to Coast"	Glenn Hughes	4:02
3.	"What Is a Woman's Role"	Hughes	5:45
4.	"Way Back to the Bone"	Hughes	5:30
5.	"Feelin' So Much Better Now"	Hughes	3:40
6.	"Will Our Love End"	Hughes	5:07
7.	"Loser"	Mel Galley, Tom Galley	4:45
8.	"You Are the Music" ("You Are the Music, We're Just the Band" on later releases)	Mel Galley, Tom Galley	5:21

== Personnel ==
Primary personnel

- Glenn Hughes – bass, piano, vocals
- Mel Galley – guitar
- Dave Holland – drums, percussion

Technical

- Neil Slaven – production
- John Burns – engineering
- Dave Grinsted – engineering
- Carl Dunn – photography
- Fin Costello – photography
- Garry Sharpe-Young – liner notes

Guest musicians

- B. J. Cole – steel guitar on "Keepin' Time" and "Coast to Coast"
- Rod Argent – electric piano on "Coast to Coast", piano on "Feelin' So Much Better Now"
- Kirk Duncan – electric piano on "What Is a Woman's Role"
- John Ogden – percussion on "What Is a Woman's Role"
- Frank Ricotti – vibraphone on "Will Our Love End"
- Jimmy Hastings – alto saxophone on "Will Our Love End"
