= Phenomena (band) =

UK rock music project

- Origin: England
- Genres: Hard rock; progressive rock; AOR
- Years active: 1984–present
- Labels: Bronze; Arista; BMG; Parachute; Escape; Explore Rights Management Ltd.
- Spinoff of: Trapeze
- Members: Tom Galley
- Past members: Mel Galley; Glenn Hughes; John Thomas; Neil Murray; Ted McKenna; Cozy Powell; Don Airey; Richard Bailey; Ray Gillen; Brian May; Scott Gorham; Kyoji Yamamoto; Lynch Radinsky; Toshihiro Niimi; John Wetton; Leif Johansen; Max Bacon; Michael Sturgis; Lee Small; Tony Martin

Phenomena is a rock music concept formed by record producer Tom Galley and his brother, Whitesnake guitarist Mel Galley. Contributors were leading rock musicians such as Glenn Hughes, Brian May, and John Wetton, amongst others.

== History ==
In a cover story run by Kerrang! magazine in 1985, Phenomena's production of rock songs based on a story line running through a whole album, attached to artworks and other multi-media aspects, was credited for the "return of the concept album" in the 1980s. Phenomena released three albums in the 1980s and early 1990s, and had a number one hit single in South America with "Did It All for Love", while the album charted in Europe, Japan, and Brazil. It was after working together on the second album, that Kyoji Yamamoto and Toshihiro Niimi invited Neil Murray to join Vow Wow.

== Discography ==
=== Albums ===
- Phenomena (Bronze, 1985) – UK No. 63
- Phenomena II: Dream Runner (Arista, 9 November 1987)
- Phenomena III: Inner Vision (Parachute Music, 1993)
- Psycho Fantasy (Escape Music, 2006)
- Blind Faith (Escape Music, 2010)
- Awakening (Escape Music, 2012)
- The Crazy House (Metalville, 2027)

=== Singles ===
- "Dance with the Devil" (Bronze, 14 June 1987)
- "Did It All for Love" (Arista, 19 October 1987)

=== Compilation albums ===
- Phenomena Project X 1985–1996 (1997) (Creative World Entertainment)
- The Complete Works (2006 CWE) (first three albums partly remixed, plus bonus tracks, but omitting three tracks inadvertently)
- Phenomena Anthology (2019) (Explore Rights Management Ltd)
- Phenomena Still the Night (2020) (All recordings with Glenn Hughes on lead vocals) (Explore Rights Management Ltd)
