= Welcome to the Real World (Trapeze album) =

1998 live music album by Trapeze

Live album by Trapeze
- Released: 1993
- Recorded: 16 May 1992
- Venue: The Borderline, London, UK
- Genre: hard rock
- Length: 59:05
- Label: Purple
- Producer: Galley, Holland, Hughes

Trapeze chronology
Live in Texas: Dead Armadillos (1981)	Welcome to the Real World (1993)	High Flyers: The Best of Trapeze (1996)

Professional ratings
Review scores
Source	Rating
Allmusic	2/5 stars

Welcome to the Real World is a live album by the band Trapeze released in 1998. This album is from the reunion tour of 1992 of the original line-up of Trapeze of Mel Galley, Glenn Hughes & Dave Holland with the addition of Asia and Yes keyboard player, Geoff Downes.

== Track listing ==
1. "You Are The Music" – 5:18
2. "Way Back To The Bone" – 6:36
3. "Welcome To The Real World" – 5:49
4. "Coast To Coast" – 5:50
5. "Midnight Flyer" – 6:51
6. "Homeland" – 6:20
7. "Touch My Life" – 6:31
8. "Your Love Is Alright" – 8:30
9. "Black Cloud" – 7:20

== Personnel ==
- Dave Holland
- Glenn Hughes
- Mel Galley
- Geoff Downes
