= Hold On (Trapeze album) =

Studio album by Trapeze
- Released: 19 October 1979
- Genre: Hard rock
- Length: 40:51
- Label: Aura Records
- Producer: Trapeze & Jimmy Miller

Trapeze chronology
Trapeze (1975)	Hold On (1979)	Live in Texas: Dead Armadillos (1981)

Professional ratings
Review scores
Source	Rating
Allmusic	4.5/5 stars

Hold On is the sixth and final album by the British hard rock band Trapeze. The album was originally released in Germany in 1978 under the name Running with a different track order and album cover. This was the first and only studio Trapeze album to feature vocalist Pete Goalby, who later worked with Uriah Heep.

== Track listing ==
All songs written by Mel Galley, except where noted.

=== Side one ===
1. "Don't Ask Me How I Know" (Pete Goalby) – 2:48
2. "Take Good Care" – 3:34
3. "When You Get to Heaven" (Goalby) – 4:08
4. "Livin' on Love" (Goalby) – 3:47
5. "Hold On" – 5:02

=== Side two ===
1. "Don't Break My Heart" – 5:43
2. "Running" – 4:27
3. "You Are" – 4:45
4. "Time Will Heal" – 6:37

== Trapeze ==
- Pete Goalby – lead vocals, rhythm guitar
- Mel Galley – lead guitar, backing vocals
- Pete Wright – bass
- Dave Holland – drums, percussion
- Terry Rowley – keyboards, string arrangements
