= Finders Keepers (band) =

Band

- Origin: Wolverhampton, England
- Genres: Pop
- Years active: 1965–1969
- Labels: Fontana, CBS
- Past members: Alan Clee; Jake Elcock; Roy "Dripper" Kent; Ralph Oakley; David Williams; Phil Overfield; Ian "Sludge" Lees; Mel Galley; Glenn Hughes; Dave Holland

Finders Keepers were an English band featuring Glenn Hughes, Mel Galley, and Dave Holland, all of whom would later become Trapeze members.

Hughes later sang for Deep Purple (with whom he also played bass) and Black Sabbath (on the album Seventh Star and part of its supporting tour). Galley later played guitar for Whitesnake. Holland later played drums for Judas Priest.

Finders Keepers released several singles, including a cover of "Sadie, The Cleaning Lady" in 1968.

The original band consisted of Roy "Dripper" Kent on vocals, Alan Clee on lead guitar, Ralph Oakley on rhythm guitar, Jake Elcock on bass and David Williams on drums. In 1966, Ralph Oakley left the band, and Finders Keepers continued as a four-piece. In 1967, there were several line-up changes, resulting in the band with Ian "Sludge" Lees on vocals, Mel Galley and Alan Clee on lead guitars, Phil Overfield on bass and David Williams on drums. In 1968, Glenn Hughes joined the band taking Phil Overfield's place. Later that year Dave Holland joined the band, taking David Williams' place. The resulting line-up of Ian "Sludge" Lees, Mel Galley, Alan Clee, Glenn Hughes and Dave Holland were together until 1969, when the band broke up, and Mel Galley, Glenn Hughes and Dave Holland went on to form Trapeze.
