= Play Me Out (Glenn Hughes album) =

Studio album by Glenn Hughes
- Released: July 1977
- Recorded: June 1976
- Genres: Funk; soul
- Length: 42:37; 65:03 (reissue)
- Label: RPM
- Producer: Glenn Hughes

Glenn Hughes chronology
Play Me Out (1977)	L.A. Blues Authority Volume II: Glenn Hughes – Blues (1992)

Singles from Play Me Out
- 1. "I Found a Woman" Released: July 1977 (Germany)

Professional ratings
Review scores
Source	Rating
AllMusic	2/5 stars

Play Me Out is the debut solo record by former Deep Purple and Trapeze bassist/vocalist Glenn Hughes. It was first released in July 1977. The album marked a definite change in style to Hughes’ hard rock albums with Deep Purple, moving into a funk and soul inspired direction. The album was reissued in 2010 as a special on-demand release, with the audio remastered from the original quarter inch tapes.

== History ==
Hughes had originally planned to release a solo album prior to Deep Purple splitting up. David Bowie had been initially lined up to produce the album; Bowie himself had been delving into similar musical territory at the time with Young Americans. However, due to Deep Purple's touring schedule it was impossible for Hughes to find the time to make the album.

After Deep Purple fell apart in 1976 Hughes returned to the album and started recording at the Lee Sound Studio in Pelsall. Hughes’ former Trapeze band-mates Mel Galley and Dave Holland supplied the guitars and drums, respectively for the album and in 1976 Trapeze reunited for a tour. The reunion was short lived and the US tour was not completed.

Hughes came back to the studio in the autumn of 1976 to make finishing touches to the album, but it was almost a year before the album was released. With the rise of punk rock, it was hard for Hughes to get backing for his record and Play Me Out was initially only released in Germany. It wasn't released in the UK until 1978 where it received little attention and was deleted not long after.

The album had limited re-issues in 1983 and 1990. In 1995 Play Me Out was again re-issued on RPM Records, this time including five bonus tracks: "Smile", an intended single that was never released, two tracks taken from an abandoned 1978 follow-up and two from sessions in 1994, which Hughes believed sounded similar in spirit to Play Me Out.

== Track listing ==
All tracks written by Glenn Hughes, except where noted.

1. "I Got It Covered" – 5:38
2. "Space High" – 4:57
3. "It's About Time" – 4:59
4. "L.A. Cut Off" – 4:27
5. "Well" – 1:29
6. "Soulution" – 5:40
7. "Your Love Is Like a Fire" – 6:28
8. "Destiny" – 4:56 (Mel Galley, Dave Holland, Hughes)
9. "I Found a Woman" – 4:03

=== 1995 Re-issue Bonus Tracks ===
10. "Smile" – 4:26
11. "Getting Near to You" – 4:08
12. "Fools Condition" – 4:07
13. "Take Me with You" – 4:48
14. "She Knows" – 4:57 (Bruce Gowdy, Hughes)

== Personnel ==
- Glenn Hughes – Lead Vocals, Fender Bass guitar, Electric and Acoustic Guitars (track 5), Fender Rhodes, Mini-Moog, Hohner Clavinet, ARP String Essemble
- Frank Merricks– Personal Assistant for Glenn Hughes
- Mel Galley – Guitars
- Bob Bowman – Guitars
- Pat Travers – Guitars
- Dave Holland – Drums
- Terry Rowley – Piano
- Robert Bailey – Piano
- Ron Asprey – Baritone, Tenor and Alto Saxophones
- Henry Lowther – Trumpet
- Mark Nauseef – Percussion
- Liza Strike, Joy Wright, Gunilla Norrblom – Backing Vocals
- Tim Gehrt – Drums on tracks 11 & 12
- Marc Bonilla – Various Instruments on track 13
- Bruce Gowdy – Various Instruments on track 14
- Horn arrangement by Ron Aspery
- Strings arranged by Graham Prescott
- Brad Davies – Recording Engineer
- Jon Walls – Recording Engineer AIR Studios
