= Medusa (Trapeze album) =

Studio album by Trapeze
- Released: November 1970
- Recorded: 1970
- Studio: Morgan Studios, London
- Genre: Hard rock
- Length: 40:18
- Label: Threshold
- Producer: John Lodge

Trapeze chronology
Trapeze (1970)	Medusa (1970)	You Are the Music... We're Just the Band (1972)

Singles from Medusa
- 1. "Black Cloud" Released: 1970

Medusa is the second studio album by British rock band Trapeze. Recorded in 1970 at Morgan Studios, it was produced by The Moody Blues bassist John Lodge and released in November 1970 by Threshold Records. The album was preceded by the release of the single "Black Cloud" in 1970.

== Background ==
Following the release of Trapeze's self-titled debut album Trapeze in early 1970, lead vocalist John Jones and keyboardist Terry Rowley left the band, leaving guitarist Mel Galley, bassist Glenn Hughes and drummer Dave Holland to continue as a trio. Four of the seven songs on Medusa were written by Galley and his brother Tom, two were written by Hughes, and one was written by the trio.

== Re-recording ==
The album's title track was re-recorded by Glenn Hughes in 2010 with Black Country Communion on their self-titled debut album.

== Reception ==
Professional ratings
Review scores
Source	Rating
AllMusic	4.5/5 stars

Critical reception for Medusa was generally positive. A review published on AllMusic awarded the album four and a half out of five stars, with writer Jason Anderson describing the album as "the finest offering from '70s outfit Trapeze" and "one of the decade's most underappreciated hard rock recordings". Anderson praised Hughes's "soulful vocal delivery" and Galley's "catchy and affective" guitar performance, concluding that "it's a wonder that the record isn't mentioned more when influential albums of this era are discussed".

== Track listing ==
No.	Title	Writer(s)	Length
1.	"Black Cloud"	Mel Galley, Tom Galley	6:13
2.	"Jury"	Mel Galley, Tom Galley	8:10
3.	"Your Love Is Alright"	Mel Galley, Glenn Hughes, Dave Holland	4:54
4.	"Touch My Life"	Mel Galley, Tom Galley	4:06
5.	"Seafull"	Hughes	6:34
6.	"Makes You Wanna Cry"	Mel Galley, Tom Galley	4:41
7.	"Medusa"	Hughes	5:40

== Personnel ==
Primary personnel

- Mel Galley – guitar, vocals
- Glenn Hughes – bass, piano, vocals
- Dave Holland – drums
- John Lodge – production

Additional personnel

- Roger Quested – engineering
- Phil Travers – illustration
- David Rohl – photography
