= Dave Holland (drummer) =

English drummer (1948–2018)

- Holland in 1981

Background information
- Born: 5 April 1948; Northampton, England
- Died: 16 January 2018 (aged 69) Lugo, Spain
- Genres: Hard rock; heavy metal
- Occupation: Drummer
- Years active: 1965–2004

David Holland (5 April 1948 – 16 January 2018) was an English drummer, best remembered for his time with the rock band Trapeze from 1969 to 1979 and Judas Priest from 1979 to 1989.

== Early life ==
At the age of six Holland began piano lessons, but soon developed a "mania for the drums" in his own words and begged his parents to let him have a set. After his first appearance as a stand-in for a local band, Holland realized he wanted to be a musician. When he was 14 years old, he supplemented his pocket money by playing with another local band called The Drumbeats, and selling furniture and carpets.

As a youngster, Holland listened to traditional jazz. He cited his first rock influence as Johnny Kidd and the Pirates. Later, he became interested in funk music in the vein of Booker T & the MG's, the blues rock of Free and progressive–psychedelic music of Traffic.

== Career ==
=== Early bands ===
In early 1965, he was in the Northampton band Dorian Gray. Later that year, Holland was persuaded to leave and join The Liberators who had recording and management contracts ready within a few weeks, to evolve into Pinkerton's Assorted Colours, a pop band that put autoharp to good use, taking after The Loving Spoonful. A single, "Mirror Mirror" released on 15 January 1966, on Decca and produced by future The Moody Blues producer Tony Clarke), peaked at No. 8 in the UK Singles Chart.

=== Finders Keepers ===
Holland stayed with the band until August 1968, when he joined Finders Keepers, a pop cover outfit. However, Holland continued studio session work. He did not play on a 1969 No. 5 hit single "Smile a Little Smile for Me" released by the band that used to be Pinkerton's Assorted Colours under the name of The Flying Machine.

Finders Keepers, who were soon joined by Mel Galley (guitar) and Glenn Hughes (bass), recorded several singles, with some of the songs now available on various compilations. Soon afterwards the threesome joined forces with vocalist and winds player John Jones and multi-instrumentalist Terry Rowley of The Montanas fame to form a quintet called Trapeze (the band name was Terry Rowley's idea).

=== Trapeze ===
Trapeze appeared in the British TV show Colour Me Pop and soon was swamped with offers of recording contracts, including one from The Beatles' Apple. Trapeze, however, settled for the newly formed Threshold label, belonging to The Moody Blues members. The band would soon open for The Moodies and other well-known acts. On Threshold, the band released three records, the debut as a quintet and the rest as a power trio.

Trapeze was gaining momentum at the time, especially in the southern United States, but lost a major contributor as Glenn Hughes decided to leave the band and join Deep Purple for the recording of their Burn album.

Mel Galley and Dave Holland added a bass player and a second guitarist. Dave Holland and Mel Galley also toured as part of John Lodge (musician) – Justin Hayward (of The Moody Blues fame) band The Blue Jays (Blue Jays).

In 1978 Trapeze recorded their last studio LP, Running/Hold On.

Earlier on, both Galley and Holland lent a hand in the recording of Glenn Hughes' first solo album, Play Me Out, offering a unique blend of psychedelic jazz funk. Holland was assisted by Mark Nauseef on percussion.

In 1979 and 1980, Holland recorded some drum parts for Justin Hayward's solo albums, Songwriter and Night Flight.

=== Judas Priest ===
Holland left Trapeze and joined Judas Priest in August 1979. He played drums on many of Judas Priest's platinum albums, such as British Steel, Screaming for Vengeance, Defenders of the Faith, Turbo and Ram It Down.

During the 1980s, Holland also collaborated with guitarist Robin George, as part of his band Life and on George's solo project, Dangerous Music.

In 1989, personal problems (health and family issues) and musical differences forced Holland to leave Judas Priest. He was replaced by original Saints or Sinners drummer Scott Travis, who had also previously played in the band Racer X.

=== Later career ===
Throughout the 1990s, besides touring with briefly reformed Trapeze and filling in for various bands like The Screaming Jets during their European tours, Holland gave drum clinics and private lessons, managed and produced bands such as UK band The Love Garden and the Swedish "teen funk trio" Shutlanger Sam (fronted by Kim Fransson who later had a solo career where he collaborated with among others hit songwriters Andreas Carlsson and Desmond Child) whom Holland introduced in person at a show with his former Trapeze bandmate Glenn Hughes in Vänersborg 1996, and played on various recordings of his former mates. In 1996, he participated in sessions that involved Glenn Hughes, Tony Iommi of Black Sabbath fame, and keyboardist Don Airey. In 1998, a collaboration with Al Atkins, Judas Priest's original singer, was released, featuring a few covers of early Priest songs that Holland did not originally play on. Judas Priest with Atkins at the helm had supported Trapeze in 1971.

== Imprisonment ==
In 2004, Holland was arrested and later found guilty by a jury at Northampton Crown Court of one count of attempted rape and five counts of indecent assault against a 17-year-old male with learning difficulties. The offences occurred at Holland's rural English home in 2002 against a boy who had hired Holland to give him drum lessons. The jury also found a co-accused, a 22-year-old man, not guilty of four counts of indecent assault. Following the verdict, Judge Charles Wide told the court that Holland had "deliberately and calculatedly planned a strategy to abuse a boy who he knew was exceptionally vulnerable". Holland had steadfastly denied all charges, telling the court "There might have been the odd hug or something like that. I know it is politically incorrect nowadays, but kids like to be shown a bit of affection." It was revealed at trial that the victim had occasionally spent the night at Holland's house while taking lessons, and his parents learned of what Holland was doing when they received a letter from their son detailing the sexual abuse. He was sentenced to eight years in prison. In an interview during the criminal proceedings, Holland revealed publicly for the first time that he was bisexual.

Holland had previously completed some recording sessions with guitarist Tony Iommi. When word of his arrest became public, Iommi had Holland's drum tracks re-recorded by Jimmy Copley, not wanting any association with a convicted sex offender.

In late 2006, Holland told author Neil Daniels in a letter from prison that he was in the process of writing his autobiography. Holland also stated his intent to appeal his conviction, saying "I was convicted of a crime that I didn't commit, and like so many others in similar situations to the one in which I find myself, an offense that never even existed in the first place...". He also railed against the legal system itself, telling Daniels "There is absolutely no difference whatsoever between the criteria that is permitted to be applied in sex offences now and that which was applied in cases of witchcraft in the 17th century."

Holland was released from prison in 2012 after having served his full sentence.

== Death ==
Holland died on 16 January 2018 at Hospital Universitario Lucus Augusti in Lugo, Spain. Holland had been living in the nearby town of A Fonsagrada. The newspaper reported that Holland's remains had been cremated. Holland died less than two weeks after being diagnosed with cancer of the liver and the lungs.

== Discography ==
With Pinkerton's Assorted Colours

- Mirror Mirror / She don't care (single) (1965)
- Don't stop loving me baby / Will ya? (single) (1966)
- Magic Rocking Horse / It Ain't right (single) (1966) (as "Pinkerton's Colours")
- Mum and dad / On a street car (single) (1967) (as "Pinkerton's Colours")
- There's nobody I'd sooner love / Duke's Jetty (single) (1968) (as "Pinkerton's")
- Kentucky Woman / Behind the mirror (single) (1968) (as "Pinkerton's")

With Trapeze

- Trapeze (1970)
- Medusa (1970)
- You Are the Music...We're Just the Band (1972)
- The Final Swing (1974) (compilation, 2 previously unreleased songs)
- Hot Wire (1974)
- Trapeze (1975)
- Running (1978) aka Hold On (1979)
- Welcome to the Real World – Live at the Borderline 1992 (1998)
- Live Way Back to the Bone (1998) (previously unreleased compilation of live songs 1970–1972)
- Live at the Boat Club 1975 (2003)

With Blue Jays

- Live at Lancaster University, 1975 (The Moody Blues – Timeless Flight box set CD7, 2013)

With Glenn Hughes

- Play Me Out (1977)

With Justin Hayward

- Songwriter (1977)
- Night Flight (only the song "Crazy Lovers") (1980)

With Robin George

- Too late (released as "Life"; single; b-side: Castles) (1980)
- The History 12" (EP; recorded 1979–1981) (1983)
- Dangerous Music (only the song "Showdown", recorded 1979–1981) (1985)
- History (recorded 1979–1981) (2014)

With Judas Priest

- British Steel (1980)
- Point of Entry (1981)
- Screaming for Vengeance (1982)
- Defenders of the Faith (1984)
- Turbo (1986)
- Priest...Live! (1987)
- Ram It Down (1988)

With Marchesi

- Encrucijada (1992)

With Tony Iommi

- Eighth Star (1996) (unofficial release; later released in 2004 as The 1996 DEP Sessions, with Holland's drum tracks re-recorded by Jimmy Copley)

With Al Atkins

- Victim of Changes (1998)

== Bibliography ==
- Personal recollections of Bob Ketchum
- Steve Gett, Metal Mania (1984)
- Judas Priest Tourbooks
