= Peter Goalby =

British singer

- Born: 13 July 1950 (age 76); Wolverhampton, England
- Occupations: Singer, musician, songwriter
- Instruments: Vocals, guitar
- Formerly of: Uriah Heep, Trapeze

Peter Goalby (born 13 July 1950) is an English rock singer. Best known as the lead vocalist for Uriah Heep between 1982 and 1986, recording three albums with the band. He also wrote Blood Red Roses, recorded by the band for their 1989 album Raging Silence and released as the second single from the album.

Before singing for Uriah Heep, Goalby's first recording band was Wolverhampton based pop band Fable, who released 1 album in 1973 on Magnet Records. After another single, he left Fable, and released a couple of singles on Magnet, as a solo artist.

In 1977 he joined Trapeze, as singer, to ease the vocal work of guitarist Mel Galley.

In late 1978 he was offered the singer position in Rainbow, which he accepted. During rehearsals in early '79, prior to songwriting for the Down To Earth album Goalby had difficulties working with Ritchie Blackmore, and wound up being fired. He later auditoned for Uriah Heep, but was passed over, with Heep choosing John Sloman (Ken Hensley later claimed he was out-voted, and had wanted Goalby at that time).

Still with Trapeze, he recorded the album, originally titled Running, for the small German label Shark Records in 1978. But the band would then sign with Aura Records (UK, US...) and the album would be re-released a year later, and re-titled Hold On, with a completely different cover (the German version featured a nude model on the cover and is somewhat collectable). Some time in here Goalby also recorded songs for a project called 'Destiny'. This included members of Nightwing, as well as Tommy Aldridge and Pat Thrall, and Terry Uttley (Smokie). The 9 songs recorded here have never been released (officially or bootlegged), but a few would be recorded later by Nightwing, Trapeze and Uriah Heep. The project was engineered by Ashley Howe, who would play a hand in Peter Goalby becoming the lead singer for Uriah Heep soon after. Following a final US tour with Trapeze, which resulted in the live album Live in Texas: Dead Armadillos (1981), he joined Heep in late 1981.

With Uriah Heep, Goalby recorded the albums Abominog (1982), Head First (1983), and Equator (1985), as well as the live DVD Live In London (Gypsy). He was also a major contributor to the band's songwriting during this period. But following numerous tours, with little time off, he gave his notice at the end of an Australian tour in 1985. Despite his name being coming up as a potential replacement in a few bands (such as Foreigner), no offers came. During his post-Heep time, Goalby focused on songwriting, and recorded numerous demos that he hoped to lead to being used by other artists or a solo deal. He eventually became tired of the business and retired from songwriting and performing in the early 90s.

In 2019 Purple Records released the Trapeze compilation 'The Best of Trapeze: Leaving The Hard Times Behind'. Although this only included 2 tracks from Goalby's time in the band, it did include a bonus CD of an early live show he had done with the band, recorded in April of '77. A few more songs from his time with Trapeze would be included on the archival releases 'Lost Tapes: Vol 1' and 'Lost Tapes: Vol 2', released in 2023 and '24.

In 2021, many of his demos, which were excellent quality came in to the proper hands (Explore Rights Management), after many of his songs had been bootlegged as far back as 1990. The first Peter Goalby solo release was Easy With The Heartaches (2021), followed by I Will Come Runnin' (2022), The Solo Anthology (2022), and Don't Think This Is Over (2025). The latter included songs most recently discovered, and would include guests Mick Box, John Sinclair, as well as Peter Kent. Important to note that on his solo recordings, much of the music (keyboards, programming, etc..) was done by Paul Hodson (ex Ten), as well as these included guitar contributions from Eddy Morton.

Over the years he has also has written songs for other artists, notably "The Bump", recorded by Alvin Stardust on his 1970's album "The Untouchable" and 70's dance group Zig-Zag "Falling Apart" recorded and released by Smokie on their 1989 album "Boulevard of Broken Dreams" and has cowritten songs with John Parr on his album "Man in Motion".

== Discography ==
=== Solo ===
==== As Peter Goalby ====
- Ain't it Funny b/w Shirt on a Loser (1975)
- You are Day, You are Night b/w Captain's Log (1975)
- Easy With The Heartaches (2021) - official CD of previously unreleased solo recordings
- I Will Come Runnin (2022)
- Solo Anthology (2022)
- Don't Think This Is Over (2025)

==== As Peter Goalby's Perfect Stranger ====
- I Don't Wanna Fight b/w It's all Over Your Face (1988)

=== As band member ===
==== With Fable ====
- Fable (1973)
- See My Face b/w Thick as a Plank (1973)
- Motorbike b/w Gotta Getaway (1973)

==== With Trapeze ====
- Hold On (1979)
- Live in Texas: Dead Armadillos (1981)
- On the Highwire (2003)

==== With Uriah Heep ====
- Abominog (1982)
- Head First (1983)
- Equator (1985)

=== Other appearances ===
Year	Artist	Title	Notes
1985	The European Team	Sport Alive b/w Guitar Alive	Appearance as a member of Uriah Heep
1985	Shy	Brave the Storm	backing vocals alongside then fellow Uriah Heep member John Sinclair.
1990	Tigertailz	Bezerk	backing vocals alongside John Blood
1992	John Parr	Man with a Vision	co-arranger and rhythm guitar on three tracks
