= Live in Texas: Dead Armadillos =

Live album by Trapeze
- Released: July 1981
- Recorded: May 1981
- Genre: Hard rock
- Length: 41:57
- Label: Aura, Big Eye
- Producer: Trapeze

Trapeze chronology
Hold On (1979)	Live in Texas: Dead Armadillos (1981)	Welcome to the Real World (1992)

Professional ratings
Review scores
Source	Rating
Allmusic	3/5 stars

Live In Texas: Dead Armadillos is a 1981 live album by the band Trapeze.

== Track listing ==
1. "Back Street Love" – 6:55
2. "Hold On" – 5:29
3. "Midnight Flyer" – 7:33
4. "You Are The Music" – 6:01
5. "Black Cloud" – 9:05
6. "Way Back To The Bone" – 6:58

== Trapeze ==
- Mel Galley - guitars, vocals
- Pete Goalby - lead vocals, guitar
- Pete Wright - bass
- Steve Bray - drums
