= Trapeze (1975 album) =

Studio album by Trapeze
- Released: 1975
- Recorded: September 1975
- Studio: Island Studios, London
- Genre: Hard rock; blues rock
- Length: 34:25
- Label: Warner Bros.
- Producer: Steve Smith

Trapeze chronology
| Hot Wire (1974) | Trapeze (1975) | Hold On (1979) |

Trapeze, also known as Trapeze 1975, is the fifth studio album by English hard rock band Trapeze. Recorded with producer Steve Smith at Island Studios, London, it was released in 1975 by Warner Bros. Records. The album was preceded by the release of one single, a cover version of "On the Sunny Side of the Street", originally recorded by Frank Sinatra.

== Reception ==
Professional ratings
Review scores
| Source | Rating |
|---|---|
| AllMusic | 2/5 stars |

Music website AllMusic awarded Trapeze two out of five stars. Writer Dave Thompson described the album as "a dour little disc, desperately missing the funk infusions of Glenn Hughes and, for the most part, overshadowed even by its disappointing predecessor". Thompson identified opening track "Star Breaker" as "probably the best" song on Trapeze, but summarised the release as "lumpen rock by rote, dull and dismissed by all but the most desperately faithful".

== Track listing ==
| No. | Title | Writer(s) | Length |
|---|---|---|---|
| 1. | "Star Breaker" | Mel Galley, Tom Galley | 3:30 |
| 2. | "It's Alright" | Mel Galley | 4:12 |
| 3. | "Chances" | Mel Galley, Tom Galley, Glenn Hughes | 2:30 |
| 4. | "The Raid" | Mel Galley | 2:45 |
| 5. | "On the Sunny Side of the Street" | Jimmy McHugh, Dorothy Fields | 2:40 |
| 6. | "Gimmie Good Love" | Mel Galley, Tom Galley, Steve Smith | 3:10 |
| 7. | "Monkey" | Mel Galley, Tom Galley | 3:40 |
| 8. | "I Need You" | Mel Galley | 4:35 |
| 9. | "Soul Stealer" | Mel Galley, Tom Galley | 3:30 |
| 10. | "Nothing for Nothing" | Mel Galley | 3:53 |

== Personnel ==
Musical personnel

- Mel Galley – guitar, vocals
- Rob Kendrick – guitar
- Pete Wright – bass
- Dave Holland – drums
- Glenn Hughes – vocals on tracks 3 and 10

Additional personnel

- Steve Smith – production
- Phill Brown – engineering
- Bobby Hata – mastering
- Seabrook Graves Aslett – artwork
