= Mel Galley =

British guitarist (1948–2008)

Background information
- Born: Melville John Galley; 8 March 1948; Cannock, Staffordshire, England
- Died: 1 July 2008 (aged 60) Heath Hayes and Wimblebury, Staffordshire, England
- Genres: Hard rock, funk rock, pop rock, blues rock, progressive rock, heavy metal
- Occupations: Guitarist
- Years active: 1967–2008
- Formerly of: Finders Keepers; Trapeze; Whitesnake; Phenomena

Melville John Galley (8 March 1948 – 1 July 2008) was an English guitarist, best known for his work with Whitesnake, Trapeze, Finders Keepers and Phenomena.

== Biography ==
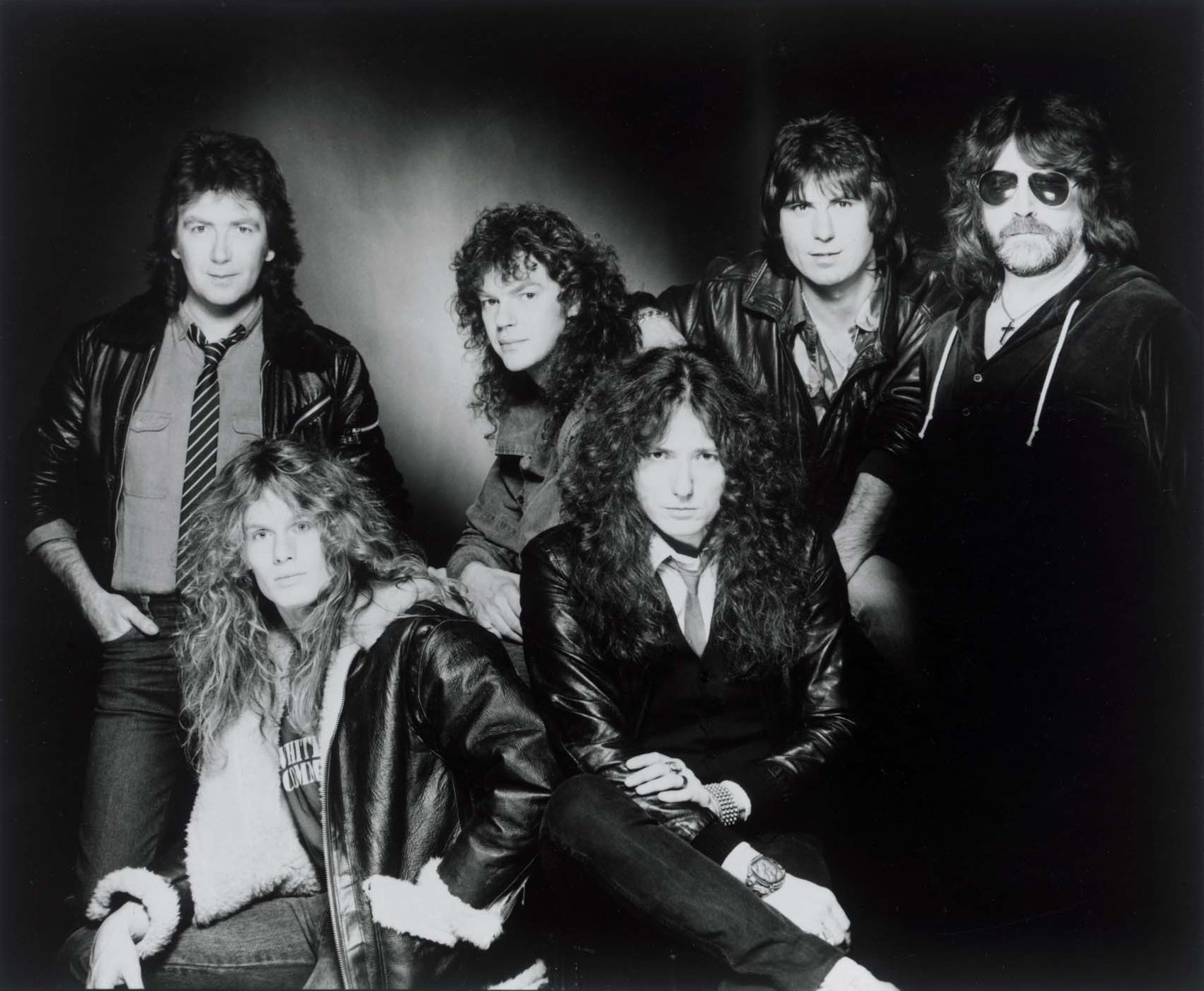
Mel Galley (first from left) as part of Whitesnake in 1984

Galley was born in Cannock, Staffordshire on 8 March 1948. While a member of Whitesnake, he badly injured his arm in an accident at a fairground in Germany and had to leave the band, as he was unable to play the guitar because of nerve damage as a result of incompetent surgery. Later he became known for playing with "The Claw", a specially developed spring and wire device fitted to his hand which enabled him to play the guitar again. Together with his brother Tom Galley and Wilfried Rimensberger, he was a founding member of Phenomena where his songwriting and guitar playing skills had a major impact on its success.

On 7 February 2008 Galley revealed that he was suffering from oesophageal cancer, and had only a short time to live.

"I have been very lucky. I have seen some great bands, and played with many great musicians. And I have enjoyed some tremendous experiences. I am thankful that I can say a proper goodbye to all the friends I have made, who are now rallying round me".

Galley died on 1 July the same year at the age of 60.

== Discography ==
=== With Finders Keepers ===
"Sadie, The Cleaning Lady" (single) (1968)

=== With Trapeze ===
- Trapeze (1970)
- Medusa (1970)
- You Are the Music...We're Just the Band (1972)
- The Final Swing (1974)
- Hot Wire (1974)
- Live At The Boat Club (1975)
- Trapeze (1975)
- Hold On a.k.a. Running (1978)
- Live in Texas: Dead Armadillos (1981)
- Welcome to the Real World (1998)
- High Flyers: The Best of Trapeze (1996)
- Way Back to the Bone (1986)
- On the Highwire (2002)

=== With Glenn Hughes ===
- Play Me Out (1977)

=== With Whitesnake ===
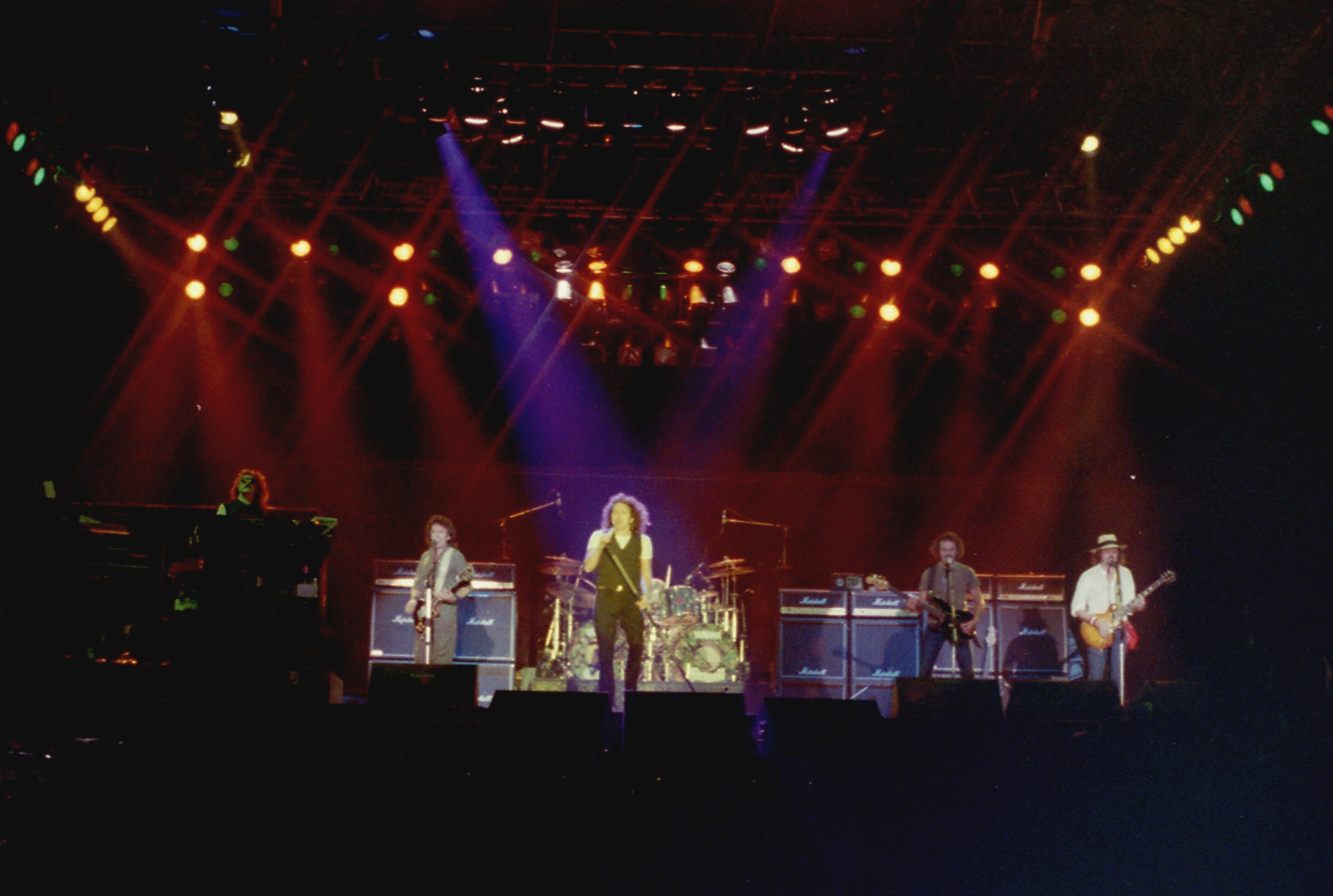
Mel Galley (to the left of singer David Coverdale) performing as part of Whitesnake in 1983

- Saints & Sinners (backing vocals only) (1982)
- Slide It In (1984)
- Live in 1984: Back to the Bone (2014)

=== With Phenomena ===
- Phenomena (Bronze 1985)
- Phenomena II "Dream Runner" (RCA 1987)
- Phenomena III "Inner Vision" (1993)
- Psychofantasy (Escape 2006)
- Blind Faith (Escape 2010)

=== With Cozy Powell ===
- Octopuss (1983)
