= Glenn Hughes discography =

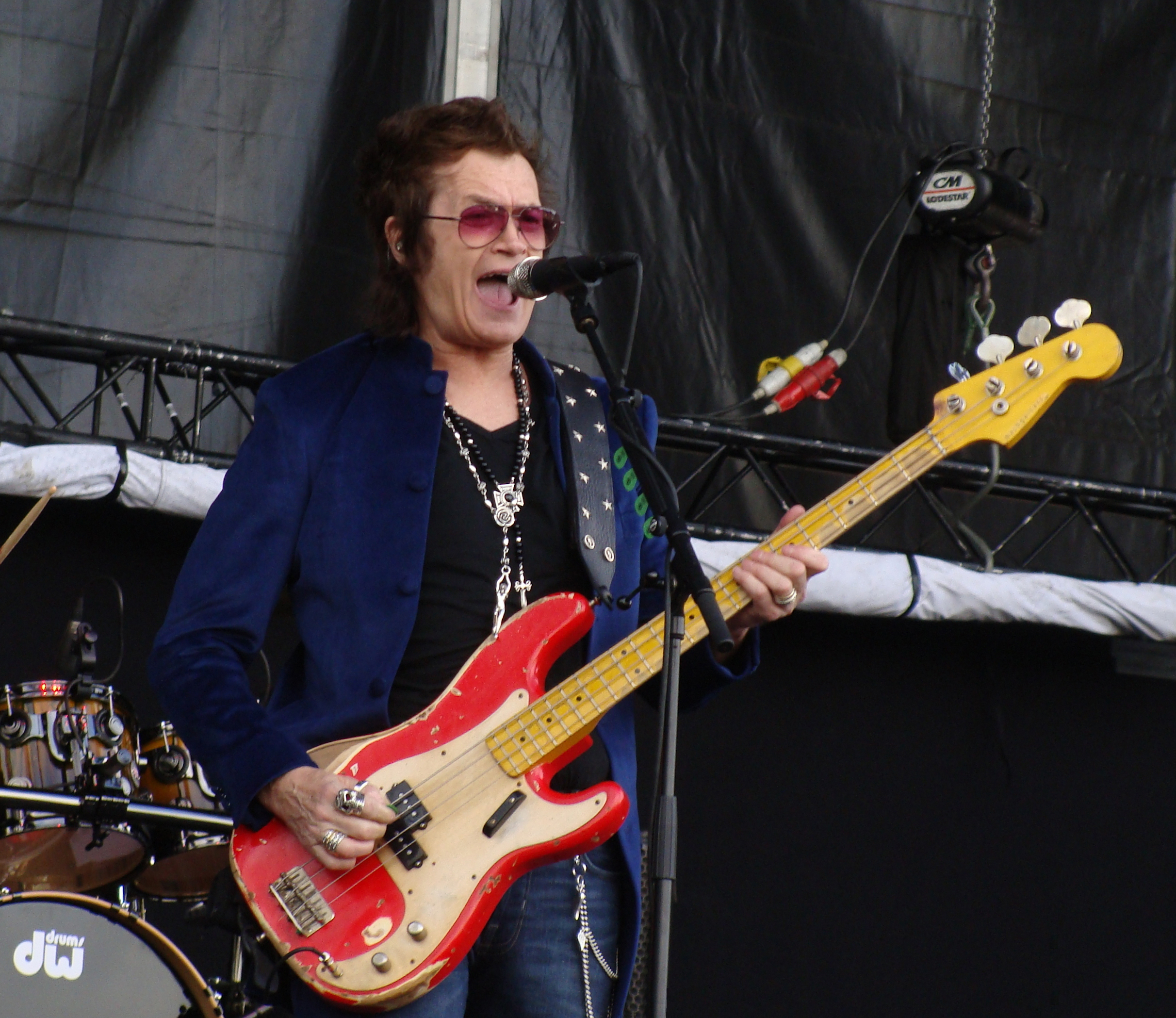
- Studio albums: 18
- Live albums: 6
- Compilation albums: 4
- Video albums: 1
- Music videos: 13

This is the discography of Glenn Hughes, a British musician who is known for playing bass and singing with funk rock pioneers Trapeze and the Mk. III and IV line-ups of Deep Purple, as well as briefly fronting Black Sabbath in the mid-1980s. Hughes is an active session musician and has a solo career; in recent years, he has been the frontman of the supergroup Black Country Communion until their disband in 2013 and California Breed until their disband in 2015. Black Country Communion reformed in 2016 and released their latest album BCCIV, and are also planning a follow-up sometime in 2021. In 2020 he joined The Dead Daisies and performs vocals & bass on their latest album Holy Ground, which was released in January 2021.

== Solo discography ==
=== Studio albums ===
Date	Title	Notes
1977	Play Me Out	
1993	L.A. Blues Authority Volume II: Glenn Hughes – Blues	
1994	From Now On...	
1995	Feel	
1996	Addiction	
1999	The Way It Is	
2000	Return of Crystal Karma	
2000	A Soulful Christmas	
2001	Building the Machine	
2003	Songs in the Key of Rock	
2005	Soul Mover	
2006	Music for the Divine	
2008	First Underground Nuclear Kitchen	
2016	Resonate	
2025	Chosen	

=== Live albums ===
Date	Title	Notes
1994	Burning Japan Live	
2001	Days of Avalon (VHS)	First official solo video release
2003	Freak Flag Flyin'	
2004	Soulfully Live in the City of Angels (CD & DVD)	
2007	Live in Australia (CD & DVD)	
2012	Live at Wolverhampton (CD & DVD)	

=== Compilation & EPs ===
Date	Title	Type	Notes
1997	Talk About It EP	EP	Previously unreleased live and acoustic tracks
1998	The God of Voice: Best of Glenn Hughes	Greatest Hits	
2000	From the Archives Volume I – Incense & Peaches	Compilation	Demos and unreleased tracks
2002	Different Stages – The Best of Glenn Hughes	Greatest Hits	
2007	This Time Around	Greatest Hits	
2009	Glenn Hughes Alive Drive		USB

=== Collaborations ===
Date	Projects	Title	Notes
1982	Hughes/Thrall	Hughes/Thrall	Studio, Remastered in 2007
1985	Gary Moore	Run for Cover	Studio, The album features many of Moore's musical friends, including Glenn Hughes, Paul Thompson and Phil Lynott
1992	John Norum	Face The Truth	Studio
1994	Manfred Ehlert's feat. Glenn Hughes / Marc Storace	Amen	
1998	Glenn Hughes/Geoff Downes	The Work Tapes	Studio, recorded 1991
1998	Glenn Hughes, Johnnie Bolin & Friends	Tommy Bolin: 1997 Tribute	Live Tribute album
2002	Hughes Turner Project	HTP	Studio
2002	Hughes Turner Project	Live In Tokyo	Live album
2003	Hughes Turner Project	HTP 2	Studio
2004	Tony Iommi with Glenn Hughes	The 1996 DEP Sessions	previously distributed demo was released in 1996 as 'Eighth Star' with Dave Holland on drums
2005	Tony Iommi with Glenn Hughes	Fused	Studio
2005	Rata Blanca & Glenn Hughes	Teatro Gran Rex (XIV-XII-MMIII)	Live DVD
2005	Michael Men Project	Made In Moscow	With Joe Lynn Turner
2008	Robin George/Glenn Hughes	Sweet Revenge	Studio, recorded 1990
2008	Keith Emerson/Glenn Hughes/Marc Bonilla	Boys Club – Live From California	Live album
2018	Joe Satriani	What Happens Next	Studio - bass only
2026	SATCHVAI Band	The Sea of Emotion	Vocals on "I Wanna Play My Guitar"

== As band member ==
Date	Bands	Title	Type	Notes
1968	Finders Keepers	Sadie, the Cleaning Lady	Single	
1970	Trapeze	Trapeze	Studio	
1970	Trapeze	Medusa	Studio	
1972	Trapeze	You Are the Music...We're Just the Band	Studio	
1974	Trapeze	The Final Swing	Greatest Hits	Compilation + 2 new tracks
1986	Trapeze	Way Back to the Bone – Best of 1970–1972	Greatest Hits	
1993	Trapeze	Welcome to the Real World – live 1992	Live	Live from the reunion tour
1996	Trapeze	High Flyers: The Best of Trapeze – Best of Studio 1970–1974	Greatest Hits	
1998	Trapeze	Way Back to the Bone Live	Live	Collection of previously unreleased live material from 1970–1972
2003	Trapeze	On the Highwire – Best of 1970–1992	Greatest Hits	
1974	Deep Purple Mk III & IV	Burn	Studio	Mk III, 30th Anniversary Edition 2004
1974	Deep Purple Mk III & IV	Stormbringer	Studio	Mk III, 35th Anniversary Edition 2009
1975	Deep Purple Mk III & IV	Come Taste the Band	Studio	Mk IV, 35th Anniversary Edition 2010
1976	Deep Purple Mk III & IV	Made in Europe	Live	Mk III
1977	Deep Purple Mk III & IV	Last Concert in Japan	Live	Mk IV
1982	Deep Purple Mk III & IV	Live in London	Live	Mk III, Remastered Edition 2007
1985	Deep Purple Mk III & IV	Rises Over Japan	Live	Mk IV, VHS
1995	Deep Purple Mk III & IV	On the Wings of a Russian Foxbat: Live in California 1976 King Biscuit Flower Hour Presents: Deep Purple in Concert Extended Versions Live at Long Beach 1976	Live	Mk IV, Remastered in 2003 and again in 2016 for the Deep Purple (Overseas) Live Series
1996	Deep Purple Mk III & IV	California Jamming	Live	Mk III, Remastered Edition 2003
1996	Deep Purple Mk III & IV	Mk III: The Final Concerts	Live	Mk III
2000	Deep Purple Mk III & IV	Days May Come and Days May Go, the California Rehearsals, June 1975 The 1975 California Rehearsals 1420 Beachwood Drive: The 1975 Rehearsals, Volume 2	Live	Mk IV
2001	Deep Purple Mk III & IV	This Time Around: Live in Tokyo	Live	Mk IV, Remix & Expanded Edition of Last Concert in Japan
2001	Deep Purple Mk III & IV	Live in Paris 1975	Live	Mk III, Remastere 2012
2004	Deep Purple Mk III & IV	Live In San Diego 1974 / Perks and Tit	Live	Mk III
2005	Deep Purple Mk III & IV	Live in California 74	Live	DVD
2009	Deep Purple Mk III & IV	History, hits & highlights '68–'76	Compilation	DVD
2011	Deep Purple Mk III & IV	Phoenix Rising	Documentary & Live	Mk IV, CD&DVD, includes Rises Over Japan & new documentary about the 1975/1976 tour
2014	Deep Purple Mk III & IV	Graz 1975	Live	Mk III
1979	Four On The Floor	Four On The Floor	Studio	
1985	Phenomena	Phenomena	Studio	
1987	Phenomena	Phenomena II: Dream Runner	Studio	
2006	Phenomena	Psychofantasy	Studio	
1986	Black Sabbath	Seventh Star	Studio	
2000	Voodoo Hill	Voodoo Hill	Studio	
2004	Voodoo Hill	Wild Seed of Mother Earth	Studio	
2015	Voodoo Hill	Waterfall	Studio	
2010	Black Country Communion	Black Country	Studio	
2011	Black Country Communion	2	Studio	
2012	Black Country Communion	Live Over Europe	Live	
2012	Black Country Communion	Afterglow	Studio	
2017	Black Country Communion	BCCIV	Studio	
2024	Black Country Communion	V	Studio	
2014	California Breed	California Breed	Studio	
2020	The Dead Daisies	The Lockdown Sessions	EP	
2021	The Dead Daisies	Holy Ground	Studio	
2022	The Dead Daisies	Radiance	Studio	

== Session Work/With others ==
- Roger Glover and Guests – The Butterfly Ball and the Grasshopper's Feast (1974)
- Jon Lord – Windows (1974)
- Tommy Bolin – Teaser (1975)
- Various Artists – The Wizard's Convention (1976)
- Pat Travers – Makin' Magic (1977)
- The Chromatics – Hot Stuff / Jookin at the Joint (1980)
- Climax Blues Band – Lucky for Some (1981)
- Night Ranger – Midnight Madness (1983)
- Heaven – Where Angels Fear to Tread (1983)
- Various Artists – Dragnet (motion picture soundtrack) (1987)
- Whitesnake – Slip of the Tongue (1989)
- XYZ – same (1989)
- Notorious – same (1990)
- Various Artists – Music from and Inspired by the Film Highlander II: The Quickening (1991)
- L.A. Blues Authority, Volume I - same (1992)
- The KLF – "America: What Time Is Love?" (single) (1992)
- Lynch Mob – same (1992)
- Geoff Downes/The New Dance Orchestra – Vox Humana (European version) (1993)
- Sister Whiskey – Liquor and Poker (1993)
- Marc Bonilla – American Matador (1993)
- George Lynch – Sacred Groove (1993)
- Stevie Salas – Stevie Salas Presents: The Electric Pow Wow (1993)
- Mötley Crüe – Mötley Crüe (1994)
- Various Artists – Smoke on the Water: A Tribute (1994)
- L.A. Blues Authority Volume V – Cream of the Crop: A Tribute (1994)
- Hank Davison & Friends – Real Live (1995)
- Brazen Abbot – Live and Learn (1995)
- Wet Paint – Shhh..! (1995)
- Richie Kotzen – Wave of Emotion (1996)
- Liesegang – No Strings Attached (1996)
- Asia – Archiva Vol. 1 (1996)
- Various Artists – To Cry You a Song: A Collection of Tull Tales (1996)
- Various Artists – Dragon Attack: A Tribute to Queen (1996)
- Amen – Aguilar (1996)
- Stuart Smith – Heaven and Earth (1998)
- Various Artists – Humanary Stew: A Tribute to Alice Cooper (1999)
- Various Artists – Encores, Legends & Paradox: A Tribute to the Music of ELP (1999)
- The Bobaloos – The Bobaloos (1999)
- Niacin – Deep (1999)
- Erik Norlander – Into the Sunset (2000)
- Tidewater Grain – Here on the Outside (2000)
- Craig Erickson Project – Shine (2000)
- Nikolo Kotzev – Nostradamus (2001)
- Max Magagni – Twister (2001)
- Various Artists – Stone Cold Queen: A Tribute (2001)
- Various Artists – Another Hair of the Dog – A Tribute to Nazareth (2001)
- Various Artists – Let the Tribute Do the Talking – A Tribute to Aerosmith (2001)
- Ape Quartet – Please Where Do We Live? (2001)
- Voices of Classic Rock – Voices for America (2001)
- Ellis – Ellis Three (E-III) (2001)
- The Alchemist – Songs from the Westside (2002)
- An All Star Lineup Performing the Songs of Pink Floyd – same (2002)
- Ryo Okumoto – Coming Through (2002)
- Jeff Scott Soto – Prism (2002)
- Various Artists – Influences & Connections, Volume 1, Mr.Big (2003)
- Chris Catena – Freak Out! (2003)
- Aina – Days of Rising Doom (2003)
- Monkey Business – Kiss Me On My Ego (2005)
- Vargas Blues Band – Love, Union, Peace (2005): Vocals on "Sad Eyes"
- Various Artists – Back Against the Wall (2005)
- Various Artists – "'Stealth' Music From The Motion Picture" (2005)
- Moonstone Project – Time to Take a Stand (2006)
- The Lizards – Against All Odds (2006)
- Quiet Riot – Rehab (2006)
- Ken Hensley – Blood On The Highway (2007)
- Jake E. Lee – Runnin' with the Devil (2008)
- Monkey Business – Twilight Of Jesters? (2009)
- Abbey Road – A Tribute To The Beatles (2009)
- Moonstone Project – Rebel On The Run (2009)
- Various Artists – An All-Star Salute To Christmas (2009)
- Various Artists – Childline Rocks 2009 (2009)
- One Soul Thrust – 1st (2010)
- Kens Dojo – Reincarnation (2010)
- Mike Porcaro – Brotherly Love (2011, rec. 2002)
- Pushking – The World as We Love It (2011)
- Joe Bonamassa – Dust Bowl (2011)
- Various Artists – Sin-Atra (2011)
- The Slam – Hit It (2011)
- Vargas Blues Band – Vargas Blues Band & Company (2012): Vocals on "Sad Eyes (new mixed)"
- Ken Hensley – Love & Other Mysteries (2012)
- Various Artists – Re-Machined: A Tribute to Deep Purple's Machine Head (2012)
- Device – Device (2013)
- Gov't Mule – Shout! (2013)
- Various Artists – Ronnie James Dio This Is Your Life (2014)
- Various Artists – Rock Against Trafficking (2014)
- Billy Ray Cyrus – Still the King (2015, single)
- The Lizards – Reptilicus Maximus (2015)
- Bob Daisley and Friends – Moore Blues for Gary (2018)

== Film & TV appearances ==
- 1975 Deep Purple Rises Over Japan (performer) – re-issued on DVD "Phoenix Rising" in 2011
- 1977 The Butterfly Ball (performer)
- 1981 Deep Purple – California Jam (Video, performer) – re-issued in 2006 on DVD
- 1989 The Ultimate Tommy Bolin Documentary (TV, interviewee)
- 1991 Deep Purple – Heavy Metal Pioneers (Video, Warner, archive footage)
- 1992 The Black Sabbath Story Vol. 2 (Video, archive footage)
- 1995 Rock Family Trees, ep. 'Deep Purple' (BBC TV, interviewee)
- 2005 Burn – The Ultimate Critical Review (Video, interviewee)
- 2005 Heavy: The Story of Metal, ep. 'Looks That Kill' (VH1 TV, interviewee)
- 2008 Guitar Gods – Ritchie Blackmore (Video, interviewee)
- 2008 Deep Purple – In Their Own Words (Video, interviewee)
- 2009 A Shot of Whisky (History of the Whisky A Go Go club in LA) (TV, interviewee)
- 2011 Deep Purple – Phoenix Rising (Video, interviewee)
- 2011 Metal Evolution (TV mini-series, interviewee)
- 2013 Behind the Music Remastered, ep. Deep Purple (TV, interviewee)

== Music videos ==
- 1982 I Got Your Number (with Pat Thrall)
- 1982 The Look in Your Eye (with Pat Thrall)
- 1986 No Stranger to Love (with Black Sabbath)
- 1987 City of Crime (Dan Aykroyd/Tom Hanks) – from the "Dragnet" movie
- 1992 America (What Time Is Love) (with KLF)
- 1994 Pickin' Up the Pieces
- 1994 Why Don't You Stay
- 1995 Save Me Tonight
- 2000 Days of Avalon
- 2005 Soul Mover
- 2006 Black Light
- 2006 The Divine
- 2006 This House
- 2007 Monkey Man (featuring Jimmy Barnes)
- 2008 Love Communion
- 2009 Gumball (with Monkey Business)
- 2011 Man in the Middle (with Black Country Communion)
- 2014 Sweet Tea (with California Breed)
- 2025 I Wanna Play My Guitar (with SATCHVAI Band)
