= Talk About It =

Talk About It may refer to:

- Talk About It (EP), a 1997 EP by Glenn Hughes, featuring a song from the album Addiction
- Talk About It (album), a 2001 album by Nicole C. Mullen
- "Talk About It" (song), a 1990 song by Boom Crash Opera
- "Talk About It", a 1968 song and single by Harumi from Harumi
- "Talk About It", a 1974 song and single by The Diamonds
- "Talk About It", a 2005 song by Cuban Link and Jadakiss from Chain Reaction
- "Talk About It", a 2008 song and single by The Metros
- "Talk About It", a 2015 song by Dr. Dre from Compton
