= First Underground Nuclear Kitchen =

Studio album by Glenn Hughes
- Released: May 9, 2008
- Recorded: December 2007
- Genre: Funk rock
- Length: 51:58
- Label: Frontiers
- Producer: Glenn Hughes

Glenn Hughes chronology
Live in Australia (2007)	First Underground Nuclear Kitchen (2008)	Resonate (2016)

Professional ratings
Review scores
Source	Rating
AllMusic	4/5 stars

First Underground Nuclear Kitchen is the twelfth studio album by former Deep Purple, Black Sabbath and Trapeze vocalist/bassist Glenn Hughes. The album was released on 9 May 2008 by Frontiers.

== History ==
First Underground Nuclear Kitchen, the follow-up to 2006's Music for the Divine contains more funk rock–style music than his more hard rock–infused earlier records.

The album again featured Red Hot Chili Peppers drummer Chad Smith on the entirety of the record and regular guitarist JJ Marsh on two songs. Guitar player Luis Carlos Maldonado, best known for his work with John Waite, co-wrote five of the songs with Hughes. Other performances come from George Nastos on guitar and Anders Olinder and Ed Roth on keyboards.

First Underground Nuclear Kitchen was mixed by Jono Brown and Glenn Hughes.

A promotional video was shot for the song "Love Communion", the video was included on the European version of the album as an enhanced track.

First Underground Nuclear Kitchen entered the UK indie chart at No. 24

== Track listing ==
1. "Crave" – 4:20 (Hughes)
2. "First Underground Nuclear Kitchen" – 3:46 (Hughes, Maldonado)
3. "Satellite" – 4:34 (Hughes)
4. "Love Communion" – 4:46 (Hughes, Maldonado)
5. "We Shall Be Free" – 5:42 (Hughes, Maldonado)
6. "Imperfection" – 4:50 (Hughes)
7. "Never Say Never" – 5:08 (Hughes, Maldonado)
8. "We Go 2 War" – 3:50 (Hughes, Maldonado)
9. "Oil and Water" – 4:04 (Hughes)
10. "Too Late to Save the World" – 6:22 (Hughes)
11. "Where There´s a Will" – 4:27 (Hughes)

Japan bonus track

12. "Imperfection (acoustic "love mix")" – 4:54 (Hughes)

== Personnel ==
- Glenn Hughes – vocals, acoustic guitar, bass, electric guitar
- Chad Smith – drums, percussion
- Luis Carlos Maldonado – electric guitars, acoustic guitars
- JJ Marsh – electric guitar on track 9 + 10
- George Nastos – guitar on track 7 + 8
- Anders Olinder – keyboards
- Ed Roth – keyboards on track 2 + 7, piano on track 4
- Ana Lenchantin – cello on track 6
