= Talk About It (EP) =

Talk About It EP

EP by Glenn Hughes
- Released: 16 January 1997 (Japan)
- Genre: Hard rock Heavy metal
- Length: 23:45
- Label: SPV
- Producer: Glenn Hughes; Marc Bonilla; Michael Scott

Talk About It EP is an EP by former Deep Purple, Black Sabbath and Trapeze vocalist/ bassist Glenn Hughes. It was released in 1997 on SPV and was taken from the album Addiction. It includes three previously unreleased live tracks.

== Additional tracks ==
The first live track is a version of the Phenomena song Kiss Of Fire. It was recorded at Citta' Kawasaki, Japan on 24 May 1994 and is taken from the same recordings as the live album Burning Japan Live.

The second live track is an acoustic version of Coast To Coast, a track originally released on the Trapeze album You Are the Music...We're Just the Band and also included on the Hughes/Thrall record. It was recorded at Echo House Studio, Japan on 7 July 1995.

The third live track is an acoustic version of the Deep Purple song You Keep On Moving from the album Come Taste the Band. It was recorded at Studio Terra, Japan on February 26, 1994.

== Track listing ==
1. "Talk About It" – 4:48 (Bonilla, Hughes)
2. "Kiss Of Fire (live)" – 6:39 (Bailey, Galley)
3. "Coast To Coast (acoustic)" – 6:49 (Hughes)
4. "You Keep On Moving (live & acoustic)" – 5:29 (Coverdale, Hughes)

== Personnel ==
Track 1

- Glenn Hughes – Vocals/ Bass
- Marc Bonilla – Guitars/ Keyboards
- Joakim Marsh – Guitars
- Joe Travers – Drums
- R. Gaylor – Vocal Channeling

Track 2

- Glenn Hughes – Vocals
- Thomas Larsson – Guitars/ Backing Vocals
- Eric Bojfeldt – Guitars/ Backing Vocals
- John Levén – Bass
- Ian Haugland – Drums
- Mic Michaeli – Keyboards/ Backing Vocals

Track 3

- Glenn Hughes – Vocals/ Additional Keyboards
- George Nastos – Guitars
- Dave Patton – Guitars

Track 4

- Glenn Hughes – Vocals
- Thomas Larsson – Guitars
- Eric Bojfeldt – Guitars
