= Sweet Revenge =

Sweet Revenge generally refers to:

- Revenge, retaliation against a person or group in response to a wrongdoing

Sweet Revenge may also refer to:

== Film ==
- Sweet Revenge (1921 film), a film starring Hoot Gibson
- Sweet Revenge (1937 film), a Hungarian film directed by János Vaszary
- Sweet Revenge (1976 film), a film starring Sam Waterston
- Sweet Revenge, a 1984 American television film starring Alec Baldwin
- Sweet Revenge (1987 film), an action adventure starring Nancy Allen
- Sweet Revenge, a 1990 film starring Rosanna Arquette
- Sweet Revenge (1998 film), a film starring Sam Neill and Helena Bonham Carter
- Sweet Revenge (2001 film), a British television film, broadcast in two parts
- Sweet Revenge (Gei sun yan), a 2007 Hong Kong film starring Nick Cheung
- Sweet Revenge (2025 film), an American short film in the Friday the 13th franchise

== Literature ==
- Sweet Revenge, a 1970 novel by Anne Mather
- Sweet Revenge, a 1986 novel by Tate McKenna
- Sweet Revenge, a 1989 novel by Nora Roberts
- Sweet Revenge, a 1991 novel by Carolyn Keene; the 61st installment in The Nancy Drew Files
- Sweet Revenge: 10 Plays of Bloody Murder, a 1992 short story anthology edited by Marvin Kaye
- Sweet Revenge, a 1993 play by Francis Durbridge
- Sweet Revenge, a 1993 novel Jean Stribling
- Sweet Revenge; or, the Seduction series, a 1999 tetralogy of novels by Penny Jordan
- Sweet Revenge, a 2000 novel by Lynsay Sands
- Sweet Revenge, a 2006 novel by Fern Michaels; the sixth installment in the Sisterhood series
- Sweet Revenge, a 2007 novel by Diane Mott Davidson; the 14th instalment in the Culinary series
- Sweet Revenge, a 2008 novel by M. C. King, the eleventh novel based on the TV series Hannah Montana
- Sweet Revenge?, a 2011 novel by Kate Hoffmann
- Sweet Revenge: The Intimate Life of Simon Cowell, a 2012 biography of Simon Cowell by Tom Bower
- Sweet Revenge, a 2013 novel by Rebecca Zanetti; the second installment in the Sins Brothers series

== Television ==
=== Episodes ===
- "Sweet Revenge", American Hoggers season 4, episode 9 (2013)
- "Sweet Revenge", Big Sky (Australian) season 1, episode 12 (1997)
- "Sweet Revenge", Bordertown (1989) season 3, episode 8 (1990)
- "Sweet Revenge", Casualty series 19, episode 34 (2005)
- "Sweet Revenge", Dramarama series 1, episode 9 (1983)
- "Sweet Revenge", Falcon Crest season 7, episode 7 (1987)
- "Sweet Revenge", Hearts Afire season 2, episode 11 (1994)
- "Sweet Revenge", Home for Christmas season 2, episode 2 (2020)
- "Sweet Revenge", Madrasta episode 95 (2020)
- "Sweet Revenge", Major Crimes season 3, episode 9 (2019)
- "Sweet Revenge", Nero Wolfe (1981) episode 14 (1981)
- "Sweet Revenge", Onanay episode 99 (2018)
- "Sweet Revenge", Pacific Palisades episode 12 (1997)
- "Sweet Revenge", Robotboy season 1, episode 8bb (2005)
- "Sweet Revenge", Slimer! episode 11b (1988)
- "Sweet Revenge", Soldier Soldier series 5, episode 7 (1995)
- "Sweet Revenge", Starsky & Hutch season 4, episode 22 (1979)
- "Sweet Revenge", Swamp People season 7, episode 7 (2016)
- "Sweet Revenge", Teen Titans Go! season 7, episode 40 (2022)
- "Sweet Revenge", The Life and Legend of Wyatt Earp season 3, episode 20 (1958)
- "Sweet Revenge", The Secret Life of Us season 2, episode 17 (2002)
- "Sweet Revenge", T.U.F.F. Puppy season 3, episode 7b (2015)
- "Sweet Revenge! The Horrors of Honeyland!", Digimon Fusion season 2, episode 6 (2011)
- "Sweet, Sweet Revenge!", Beat Bobby Flay season 18, episode 12 (2019)

=== Series ===
- Sweet Revenge (British TV series), a 2001 British television series
- Sweet Revenge (South Korean TV series), a 2017 South Korean web series
  - Sweet Revenge 2, a 2018 South Korean television series

== Music ==
- Sweet Revenge (2000), an album by Bangs
- Sweet Revenge (Generation X album)
- Sweet Revenge (David Johansen album), and the title song
- Sweet Revenge (John Prine album), and the title song
- Sweet Revenge (Amanda Lear album), 1978 by West German label Ariola Records
- Sweet Revenge (Ryuichi Sakamoto album), 1994
- "Sweet Revenge", a song by Motörhead from Bomber
- "Sweet Revenge", a song by The 101ers

== Other uses ==
- Sweet Revenge (liqueur), a strawberry and citrus flavoured liqueur
