= Madrasta (TV series) =

Philippine television drama series

- Title card
- Also known as: A Place in Your Heart
- Genre: Drama
- Created by: Maria Zita S. Garganera
- Written by: Marlon G. Miguel; Tina Samson-Velasco; Maria Zita S. Garganera; Kenneth Angelo Enriquez; John Bedia; Cynthia Paz
- Directed by: Monti Puno Parungao
- Creative director: Aloy Adlawan
- Starring: Arra San Agustin
- Theme music composer: Elmer Blancaflor
- Opening theme: "Hayaan Mo" by Arra San Agustin
- Country of origin: Philippines
- Original language: Tagalog
- No. of episodes: 100 (list of episodes)

Production
- Executive producers: Joy Lumboy-Pili; John Mychal Feraren
- Cinematography: Alex Espartero
- Editors: Jaybe Maquiran; Jeron Ross Suñer; Jesus Bot Tana
- Camera setup: Multiple-camera setup
- Running time: 21–35 minutes
- Production company: GMA Entertainment Group

Original release
- Network: GMA Network
- Release: October 7, 2019 – February 21, 2020

Madrasta (transl. stepmother / international title: A Place in Your Heart) is a Philippine television drama series broadcast by GMA Network. Directed by Monti Puno Parungao, it stars Arra San Agustin in the title role. It premiered on October 7, 2019 on the network's Afternoon Prime line up and concluded on February 21, 2020, with a total of 100 episodes.

The series is streaming online on YouTube.

== Premise ==
Audrey Segundo, who almost gives up on her aspirations after returning to the Philippines, meets Sean Ledesma, who has been abandoned by his wife, Katharine Viduya, and their children. Audrey helps him move on, and they eventually fall in love. Katherine later returns to Sean's life to seek his money, leading to a conflict between Katherine and Audrey.

== Cast and characters ==
Cast

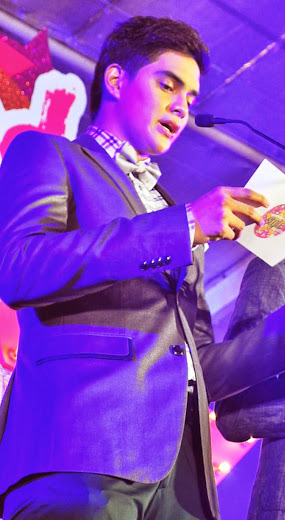
Juancho Triviño

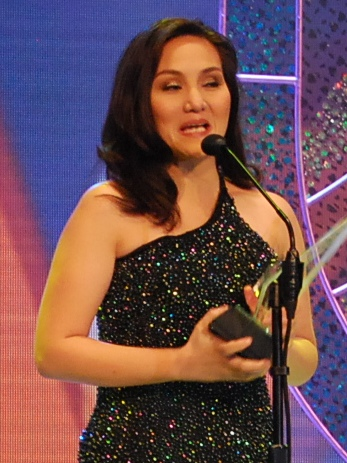
Gladys Reyes

Lead cast

- Arra San Agustin as Audrey Segundo-Ledesma / Rachel Cruz

Supporting cast

- Juancho Triviño as Sean Ledesma
- Thea Tolentino as Katharine Viduya-Ledesma / Kara Santos / Sylvia
- Gladys Reyes as Elizabeth Ledesma
- Manilyn Reynes as Grace Segundo
- Almira Muhlach as Shirley Viduya
- Phytos Ramirez as David Generoso
- Divine Aucina as Deborah "Debbie" Torres
- Ahron Villena as Gian Fontanos
- Isabelle de Leon as Judy Villas
- Kelvin Miranda as Barry Segundo
- Faye Lorenzo as Joan
- Anjo Damiles as George

Guest cast

- Alice Dixson as Angelina Cruz
- Zachie Rivera as Lauren V. Ledesma
- Jom Manzala as Timothy V. Ledesma
- Herlene Budol as Sandy Escudero
- Kristina Paner as Rita
- Sue Prado as Beth
- Kevin Sagra as Jason
- Bryan Benedict as Elvis
- Jeremy Sabido as Gareth

== Production ==
Principal photography commenced in July 2019. Filming concluded in February 2020.

== Ratings ==
According to AGB Nielsen Philippines' Nationwide Urban Television Audience Measurement People in Television Homes, the final episode of Madrasta earned a 7.5% rating.

== Accolades ==
Accolades received by Madrasta
Year	Award	Category	Recipient	Result	Ref.
2021	34th PMPC Star Awards for Television	Best Daytime Drama Series	Madrasta	Nominated	
