= Chad Smith =

American drummer (born 1961)

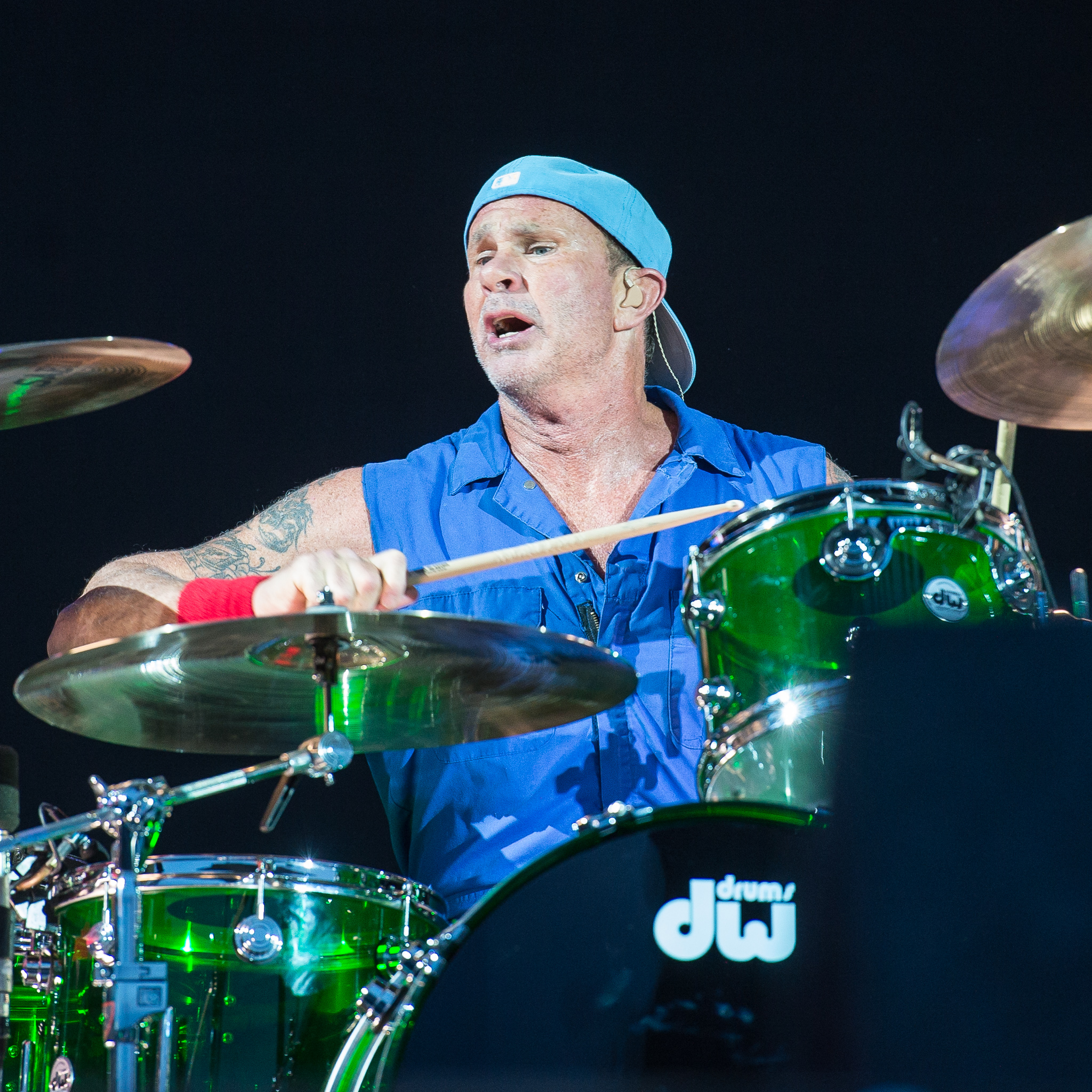
- Smith performing in 2016

Background information
- Born: Chad Gaylord Smith; October 25, 1961 (age 64); Saint Paul, Minnesota, U.S.
- Genres: Funk rock; funk metal; alternative rock; hard rock
- Occupation: Drummer
- Years active: 1977–present
- Member of: Red Hot Chili Peppers; Chickenfoot; Chad Smith's Bombastic Meatbats

Chad Gaylord Smith (born October 25, 1961) is an American musician who is the drummer of the rock band Red Hot Chili Peppers. Smith has played with Red Hot Chili Peppers since 1988, appearing on ten of their studio albums as the band’s longest-serving drummer. The group was inducted into the Rock and Roll Hall of Fame in 2012. Smith is also the drummer of the hard rock supergroup Chickenfoot, formed in 2008, and of the all-instrumental outfit Chad Smith's Bombastic Meatbats, formed in 2007. He worked with the Chicks on Taking the Long Way, an album that won five Grammy Awards in 2007.

Smith has recorded with various artists including Glenn Hughes, Johnny Cash, John Fogerty, Jennifer Nettles, Jake Bugg, the Avett Brothers, Joe Satriani, Post Malone, Eddie Vedder, Brandi Carlile, Lana Del Rey, Halsey, The Chicks, Dua Lipa, Charli XCX, Hardy and Lady Gaga. In 2010, joined by Dick Van Dyke and Leslie Bixler, he released Rhythm Train, a children's album which featured Smith singing and playing various instruments. In 2020, Smith co-wrote and performed as part of the backing band on Ozzy Osbourne's album, Ordinary Man, and again in 2022 on Patient Number 9. That same year, Smith was a member of Eddie Vedder's backing band, The Earthlings, after co-writing and recording the album, Earthling. He was the primary drummer on Iggy Pop's Every Loser the following year.

Spin magazine placed Smith at number 91 on their list of the "100 Greatest Drummers of Alternative Music" in May 2013. Readers of UK-based Rhythm magazine ranked Smith and Red Hot Chili Pepper bassist Flea the fourth-greatest rhythm section of all time in their June 2013 issue. Smith is also known for his charity work especially with young musicians. He has been a lobbyist in support of music education in U.S. public schools. Smith is also the host of the PBS concert series Landmarks Live in Concert, which began in January 2017.

== Early life ==
Smith was born in Saint Paul, Minnesota, the third child of Joan and Curtis Smith. He spent most of his childhood in Bloomfield Hills, Michigan, where he graduated from Lahser High School in 1980. Part of his schooling was spent at Homewood-Flossmoor High School in Flossmoor, Illinois. He started to play drums at age seven and grew up listening mainly to bands such as Rush, the Rolling Stones, Humble Pie, Pink Floyd, Black Sabbath, Led Zeppelin, Deep Purple, the Who, the Jimi Hendrix Experience and Kiss.

Smith did not receive formal drum lessons, and gained drumming experience by playing in school bands. He ran away from home when he was 15, but returned home after a summer.

Smith spent his early years in various rock bands, starting in high school with a band called Paradise which won a battle of the bands in Birmingham, Michigan, in 1977. Following this, Smith played with Detroit-based bands Pharaoh and Toby Redd. Pharaoh's percussionist Larry Fratangelo, who also worked with Parliament-Funkadelic, introduced Smith to R&B and funk music and taught him how to play funk. Smith said, "I think up until then, I was a drummer. Once I studied with Larry, I turned into a musician." Funk drummers David Garibaldi, Jabo Starks, Clyde Stubblefield, and Greg Errico caught his attention and influenced his style. Smith decided to move to California to pursue his musical aspirations.

== Music career ==
=== Red Hot Chili Peppers (1988–present) ===
In 1988, the Red Hot Chili Peppers were looking for a replacement for their drummer D. H. Peligro, who had recently been fired. Already into the process of working on their fourth studio album and hiring new guitarist John Frusciante the band held open auditions for a new drummer. Smith was the last drummer to audition for the band and the band felt that on looks alone, Smith would be the wrong fit as he looked more hair metal than punk. Nonetheless, the band were impressed by his audition. Singer Anthony Kiedis admired Smith and found his persistence impressive.

Smith joined the Chili Peppers in December 1988. Within a few months, he was recording his first album with the band, Mother's Milk, which was released in 1989. Smith reflected on joining the band in a 2012 interview by saying "I remember thinking, 'Oh, cool, they have a record deal. Great! I'd love to be in a band that has a record deal. We started playing, and right away we just hit it off musically. I was like, 'Man, this is a blast! These guys are great!' ... We were just doing what we do. We just jammed, which is what we still do today. It's very similar." Smith has recorded ten albums with the band since 1989 with their most recent, Return of the Dream Canteen, being released in 2022.

As of February 2026, the Chili Peppers are currently in the writing process for their fourteenth studio album. “We’ve been writing music together, recording at John Frusciante’s house, and the music feels great. Ultimately, once we start playing, it’s about… just catching a magic groove and doing it good", Flea said.

=== Chad Smith's Bombastic Meatbats (2007–present) ===
In 2007, Smith, along with fellow Glenn Hughes alumni, guitarist Jeff Kollman and keyboardist Ed Roth, formed an all-instrumental band inspired by their shared love of 1970s funk and fusion. Still unnamed at the time, the group, rounded out by bassist Kevin Chown, debuted at the 2008 NAMM Show in Anaheim, California. The band has released two studio albums and a double live disc as Chad Smith's Bombastic Meatbats since its inception.

=== Chickenfoot (2008–present) ===
Following a lengthy world tour in support of Stadium Arcadium, the Chili Peppers decided to take a break in 2008. During this break, Smith joined the hard rock supergroup Chickenfoot, whose other members are Sammy Hagar, Joe Satriani and Michael Anthony. The group has released two studio albums, a live album and a box set to date with Smith. Due to touring commitments with the Chili Peppers in 2011, Smith was unable to tour with Chickenfoot and was replaced by Kenny Aronoff. In 2012, Smith rejoined Chickenfoot for a four-song encore and the band briefly reunited for only two shows on May 7, and May 8, 2016, at Harrah's Showroom at South Lake Tahoe.

During the show, the band debuted a new song titled "Divine Termination". In June 2016, Smith discussed the future of Chickenfoot touring and recording new music saying that "everyone has different things going on. We really enjoy playing together, but with my schedule I don't see us playing too much. I would love to make some new music with those guys, but we'd have to be in the same room at the same time. I just don't know. It's up in the air. I love playing with those guys, though. It's a real treat.

=== Other projects ===
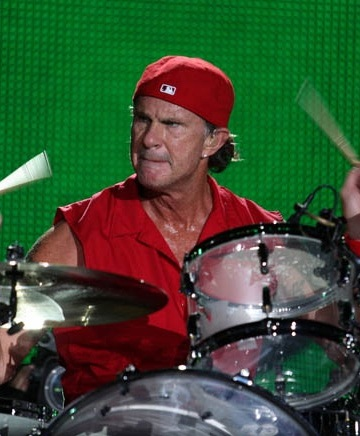
Smith performing in 2011

Smith released 2010's Rhythm Train, a critically acclaimed children's album which he recorded with Dick Van Dyke and Leslie Bixler.

Smith released an app in March 2012, which is a free mobile application for iPhone, iPad, and Android devices and features his "Drummer GPS". The GPS section of the app spotlights drummers Smith has been influenced by and those he regards as some of the best modern drummers. In May 2013, he launched In Conversation with Chad Smith, his own podcast through MusicRadar where he interviews other musical artists.

Smith joined Sammy Hagar in the studio to work on music for what would become Hagar's sixteenth studio album. They were joined by guitarist Neal Schon (from Journey) and bassist Michael Anthony and according to Hagar, it was the rebirth of his 1980s band HSAS, which featured Schon and two other members.

In 2013, Smith joined jazz musician Jon Batiste and bassist/producer Bill Laswell to create a unique musical group to score a film that had yet to be written and would never be made. The album, The Process, was released on November 4, 2014.

Starting on January 20, 2017, Smith began hosting Landmarks Live in Concert, an eight-episode concert series on PBS in which Smith will sit down and discuss music with various artists. The first two episodes featured Alicia Keys and Brad Paisley.

Smith performs drums on the Lorne Balfe composed score for The Lego Batman Movie. The soundtrack for the animated film was released on February 3, 2017.

On May 28, 2018, Smith along with co-host and Yahoo Entertainment music editor Lyndsey Parker, began their own music radio talk show on SiriusXM titled VOLUME West which airs every Monday. The duo will talk music with artists, industry leaders, friends and they will also interview their guests about their favorite songs, albums, and artists.

Smith performs drums on the Post Malone song "Take What You Want" from his third album Hollywood's Bleeding. The song also features Black Sabbath lead singer Ozzy Osbourne and rapper Travis Scott. That collaboration with Post Malone led to the creation of Osbourne's 2020 album, Ordinary Man, which Smith co-wrote along with Guns N' Roses bassist Duff McKagan and producer Andrew Watt. Smith also performed drums on every track. On December 17, 2020, it was announced that the next studio album by Ozzy Osbourne was halfway done and would again feature Smith along with Metallica bassist Robert Trujillo and drummer Taylor Hawkins from Foo Fighters.

On January 1, 2021, Post Malone during his Bud Light Seltzer Sessions New Year's Eve 2021 livestream show was joined by Smith, Slash from Guns N' Roses, Chris Chaney from Jane's Addiction and producer/guitarist Andrew Watt for a performance of Black Sabbath's "War Pigs" and "Rooster" by Alice In Chains. Smith contributed to the charity tribute album The Metallica Blacklist, released in September 2021, backing Miley Cyrus on her cover of the Metallica song "Nothing Else Matters".

Smith performs drums on Ozzy Osbourne's 2022 album, Patient Number 9. Smith also co-wrote two of the songs on the album.

Smith and Flea, Josh Klinghoffer collaborated with Morrissey on his upcoming album Bonfire of Teenagers, which was supposed to be released in February 2023, but in December 2022 it was announced that its future is in limbo, as Capitol Records decided not to release it.

Smith performs on seven of the songs and also co-wrote five songs on Iggy Pop's 2022 album, Every Loser. To promote the album, Smith will be part of Pop's backing band called The Losers which consists of Josh Klinghoffer, Duff McKagan and Andrew Watt.

It was announced in March 2024 that Smith would appear as himself in Spinal Tap II, the upcoming sequel to the 1984 mockumentary film This is Spinal Tap.

Smith performs on the song "Killah" from Lady Gaga's 2025 album Mayhem.

Smith (along with former Chili Peppers guitarist Josh Klinghoffer performs on a majority of the songs on the 2025 album, Who Believes in Angels? by Elton John and Brandi Carlile. Smith performed with John and Carlile during their April 5, 2025 appearance on Saturday Night Live and with them during April 6, 2025 television special An Evening with Elton John and Brandi Carlile that aired the following night on CBS.

On July 5, 2025, Smith performed at Back to the Beginning, an all-day concert held in Birmingham as a final farewell show for Ozzy Osbourne and Black Sabbath. Smith performed in Tom Morello's All Stars supergroup which included Morello, Steven Tyler, Sammy Hagar, Nuno Bettencourt and other musicians. Smith also had a drum off with Travis Barker and Danny Carey. The concert also raised $190 million for charity. Osbourne would pass away seventeen days later.

Smith appeared in the documentary, Ozzy Osbourne: No Escape From Now, streamed on Paramount+ on October 7, 2025, which documented the final six years of Osbourne's life.

In December 2025, Smith, Slash, Duff McKagan, and Andrew Watt performed under the band name The Dirty Bats. They were joined onstage by Bruno Mars, Brandi Carlile, Anthony Kiedis, Yungblud, and Eddie Vedder.

Smith appears on Foreign Tongues by The Rolling Stones, which was released on July 10, 2026.

== Playing style and equipment ==
Smith's technique is recognized for its use of ghost notes, as well as his fast right foot.

He cites Buddy Rich, John Bonham, Ian Paice, Mitch Mitchell, Bill Ward, Keith Moon, Stewart Copeland, Neil Peart, Ringo Starr, Ginger Baker, Roger Taylor and Topper Headon as influences on his drumming.

Smith endorses DW drums, Paiste cymbals, Remo drumheads, Vater drumsticks and LP percussion.

== Charity work ==
Smith is an active supporter of several non-profit organizations including Surfer's Healing, SeriousFun Network, MusiCares, Silverlake Conservatory of Music, Guitar Mash NY, Camp Korey and Little Kids Rock which he discussed in an interview with Making Music Magazine.

In April 2013, Smith was asked by the National Association of Music Merchants (NAMM), to represent the music community by going to Washington, D.C. as a lobbyist in support of music education in US public schools. While in DC, Smith had the opportunity to meet with congressional leaders and share his experience as a student who learned his craft entirely within the public school system. Smith has since been invited back to lobby in April 2014 in support of public school music education.

In 2014, Smith joined Bystander Revolution a group that speaks out against bullying in schools and tries to find solutions. Smith released a few videos discussing his own childhood being bullied along with his son's recent experiences with bullies.

On May 21, 2014, Smith appeared along with other celebrities in Washington, D.C. at a White House talent show held by Michelle Obama which was organized to raise awareness for Turnaround Arts, a program enacted under the guidance of the President's Committee on the Arts and Humanities (PCAH) to increase performance and achievement at some of the lowest-ranked schools in the country through arts education. Students from eight schools around the country participated in the show which featured musical theatre, spoken word and interpretative dance. President Barack Obama made a surprise appearance at the event. Smith adopted a school in Greenfield, California also lobbied Speaker of the House of Representatives John Boehner for increased funding for arts education and that it is a personal issue for him. Smith said "I didn't give a shit about science, math or English when I was in school and music was the only reason I wanted to go. It got me interested in other subjects and I would've never graduated without it. If kids can connect with some sort of art in some way, it will enrich their lives in ways they probably can't fully comprehend at the time." Earlier in the week, Smith was joined by former New York Yankee and musician, Bernie Williams at Savoy Elementary School in Washington, D.C. where together they taught a music class. "These are schools where the kids look down at their feet and have no hope and don't feel like they mean anything. They have no self-worth. They need something. This is not a photo-op and just throwing some money. You really roll your sleeves up and immerse yourself in the school." Smith said.

Smith appeared at Sammy Hagar and James Hetfield's 2nd annual Acoustic-4-A-Cure benefit concert in San Francisco, California on May 15, 2015. The benefit was held to raise money and awareness for the Pediatric Cancer Program at UCSF Benioff Children's Hospital. Smith was joined onstage by Pat Monahan of the band Train and comedian Adam Sandler for a performance of Aerosmith's "Dream On" and Led Zeppelin's "Ramble On".

The following day on May 16, 2015, Smith was honored by national nonprofit, Little Kids Rock at its annual Family Jam benefit at Facebook's Menlo Park campus for his work to help expand public schoolchildren's access to music education with the "Livin' The Dream Award". In a statement on receiving the award Smith said "It is such an honor for me to be recognized by an amazing charity like Little Kids Rock for supporting their work to keep music education thriving in our schools. Music has made such a tremendous impact in my life and I am blessed to be able to give that gift back to the next generation of music makers!"

Smith along with his Chili Peppers bandmates announced in September 2015 that they would be supporting Bernie Sanders in his campaign for the 2016 presidential election. In February 2016, the Chili Peppers performed on behalf of Sanders at his "Feel the Bern" campaign fundraiser.

On April 29, 2016, Chad Smith and Will Ferrell hosted the Red Hot Benefit Comedy + Music Show & Quinceanera. The benefit featured a performance by the Chili Peppers along with comedy acts selected by Ferrell and Funny or Die. A portion of the proceeds went to Ferrell's Cancer for College and Smith's Silverlake Conservatory of Music.

On February 12, 2018, Smith again teamed with Will Ferrell for his One Classy Night event at the Moore Theater in Seattle to help raise money for Cancer for College. Smith along with Ferrell, Mike McCready and Brandi Carlile performed songs by Jimi Hendrix, the Rolling Stones, Led Zeppelin, R.E.M. and were joined by Eddie Vedder for a cover of Depeche Mode's "Personal Jesus". The event raised $300,000 in college scholarship money for students who have survived cancer, and has raised 2.3 million to date.

On October 6, 2018, Smith and Will Ferrell hosted Will Ferrell's Best Night of Your Life, a one night charity event in Los Angeles at the Greek Theater. The event, produced by Funny or Die, will benefit Cancer for College and feature many big-name celebrities. Smith also will assemble an MVP musical line up dubbed Chad Smith's Super Mega Funktastic Jam Rock All Stars which will feature his Chili Peppers bandmate Josh Klinghoffer, Mike McCready of Pearl Jam, Duff McKagan of Guns N' Roses, Stefan Lessard of Dave Matthews Band, Brad Paisley and Chris Martin of Coldplay.

On January 13, 2019, Smith along with the Chili Peppers performed at a benefit for victims of the recent deadly Woolsey Fire. "It was cool. It was fun. It was a good vibe, and we really appreciate all the people that came down and paid a lot of money — it wasn't a cheap ticket. But all the proceeds are going to the people that suffered from the fires and the families and everything that is involved in that." Smith said that the fires even put the band's recording of their twelfth album on hold saying "the house we were working in, there was no damage, it didn't burn down, but we couldn't get back in there. So that halted our [progress]. Myself and Anthony both live in Point Dume. Seventy houses in our neighborhood burned down. Ours was spared, luckily."

=== Chad Smith Foundation ===
On August 19, 2025, Smith announced that he was starting the "Chad Smith Foundation" music school which will provide scholarships, music equipment and music education to kids. “I believe every kid, no matter where they come from, deserves the chance to explore their musical potential and find their voice. The Chad Smith Foundation is about opening doors, removing barriers, and helping young talent flourish” Smith said in a statement.

On October 11, 2025, Smith will perform along with The Pride of Minnesota, the University of Minnesota marching band, at halftime during the Minnesota Golden Gophers homecoming football game. The performance is part of a partnership between the Chad Smith Foundation, and the University of Minnesota. Smith will also appear at a luncheon that will benefit the Curtis & Joan Smith Scholarship, which honors his parents, who are alumni of the school, and will provide support for aspiring young musicians at the University's School of Music.

On November 2, 2025, Smith joined the University of Michigan Marching Band on stage during Band-o-Rama to perform “Can’t Stop.” The appearance helped announce a partnership between the Chad Smith Foundation and the University of Michigan School of Music, Theatre & Dance. The Foundation planned to endow a Curtis & Joan Smith Scholarship at Michigan to provide need-based support for an incoming music student beginning in 2026.

== Visual art ==
In January 2020, Smith opened his first art exhibit, stating "The way that I want to interpret my feelings about playing the drums and playing music - I'm trying to put this in a different medium. [...] I love to express myself in any sort of creative way that I can, and doing this is another way to kind of take chances and take a risk, and I like to do that. I think it's important for any artist to do that- to keep trying new things. It's not your normal medium, you know. It's not like Bob Ross with an afro in front of the thing and painting," Smith said.

== Personal life ==
=== Family and relationships ===
Smith has been married twice. Smith was married to Maria St John from 1992 to 1997, with whom Smith had a daughter.

In 2004, Smith married his second wife, architect Nancy Mack, with whom he has three sons. The family lives in Malibu, California.

He also has two other children through other relationships.

=== Sexual assault ===
At an MTV Spring Break concert in 1990, Smith and his bandmate Flea were accused of sexually assaulting a 20-year-old woman as she was dancing during the concert. According to beach rangers, Smith's bandmate Flea picked up the woman and swung her over his shoulder. She was thrown onto the sand; Flea and Smith spanked her and attempted to remove her swimsuit bottoms. Flea knelt on her legs, yelling at her to perform a sexual act. As a result, the two men were ordered to apologize, pay a fine, and donate to a rape crisis centre. The woman approved of this sentence. Smith in his apology wrote: "I clearly got carried away in the theatrics of the moment and I now realize how inappropriate and wrong my actions were."

=== Sobriety ===
Like some of his bandmates in the Red Hot Chili Peppers, Smith has struggled with substance abuse. He struggled with alcoholism and cocaine use for many years. He checked into a drug rehabilitation facility in 2008.

=== Sports ===
Smith is a fan of his hometown Michigan sports teams, including the NHL's Detroit Red Wings. Similarly to Kiedis and Flea, Smith is also a fan of the Los Angeles Dodgers, regularly displaying the team's logo on his drum kit.

Following the Red Hot Chili Peppers May 14, 2017, performance in Columbus, Ohio, Smith sang the University of Michigan fight song "The Victors". Smith's singing of the fight song made national news as the University of Michigan and Ohio State are longtime sports rivals. At shows in Ohio, Smith's drumset has sometimes featured the Michigan Wolverines logo. Smith and Flea have owned season tickets to the Los Angeles Rams since 2016.

=== Will Ferrell resemblance ===
Smith is widely known for his strong facial resemblance to actor and comedian Will Ferrell, which he has acknowledged by wearing shirts reading "I Am Not Will Ferrell" in live performances. Smith said that the two first met during the premiere of the film The Ladies Man (2000). He said, "I'm looking at Will and thinking, 'People really think I look like him? I don't fucking look like that. He looks me up and down and says, 'You're very handsome,' and walks away. Totally deadpan. I was like, 'You're funny. You're funny.'" Both Smith and Ferrell have utilized the resemblance for various appearances together, including their own events for charity and a 2014 appearance on The Tonight Show Starring Jimmy Fallon, in which the duo faced off in a drum battle, which segued into a musical number by the Red Hot Chili Peppers performing a cover of Blue Öyster Cult's "(Don't Fear) The Reaper", as a reference to the Saturday Night Live "More Cowbell" skit, in which both Ferrell and Jimmy Fallon starred. During a December 2022 Rams' home game in Los Angeles, the Rams' media team poked fun at the recurring gag after Smith made an appearance with the rival Seattle Seahawks' drum line the week prior, displaying Smith next to a picture of Ferrell on the Jumbotron.

Smith has said he had not considered how similar they looked, but at the studio for the Jimmy Fallon appearance, Ferrell appeared dressed exactly as he was, and he was surprised how similar they looked.

In the January 2025 Peacock documentary SNL50: Beyond Saturday Night, the entire third episode was devoted to the Saturday Night Live "More Cowbell" skit. Ferrell wrote the skit for a 2000 episode of the show and portrayed the character of Gene Frenkle. Ferrell and others in the documentary discuss the skit and its legacy including newly filmed flashback scenes with Chad Smith portraying the Frenkle character.

Smith appeared in the opening monologue of the May 16, 2026, season finale of Saturday Night Live where he impersonated Ferrell and was joined by Paul McCartney for the monologue. Smith also performed "Days We Left Behind", "Band on the Run" and "Coming Up" with McCartney along with unaired performances of The Beatles classics "Help!" and "Drive My Car" which featured Ferrell on cowbell.

=== Shark attack incident ===
While scuba diving on vacation near Wakaya Island on November 12, 1992, following the Red Hot Chili Peppers' tour of Australia, Smith was attacked by an approximately three-meter hammerhead shark. He was diving offshore when the shark began circling him. Smith attempted to keep still as the shark approached, then fended it off when it attempted to bite him. Afterwards, the shark swam away. The shark removed a "small chunk of skin" from his left arm.

== Discography ==
=== Studio albums ===
- Mother's Milk (1989)
- Blood Sugar Sex Magik (1991)
- One Hot Minute (1995)
- Californication (1999)
- By the Way (2002)
- Stadium Arcadium (2006)
- I'm with You (2011)
- The Getaway (2016)
- Unlimited Love (2022)
- Return of the Dream Canteen (2022)

=== EPs and live albums ===
- What Hits!? (1992)
- Out in L.A. (1994)
- Under the Covers: Essential Red Hot Chili Peppers (1998)
- Greatest Hits (2003)
- Live in Hyde Park (2004)
- 2011 Live EP (2012)
- Rock & Roll Hall of Fame Covers EP (2012)
- I'm with You Sessions (2013)
- I'm with You World Tour (2014)
- Cardiff, Wales: 6/23/04 (2015)
- Live in Paris (2016)

=== Glenn Hughes ===
- Songs in the Key of Rock (2003)
- Soulfully Live in the City of Angels (2004)
- Soul Mover (2005)
- Music for the Divine (2006)
- First Underground Nuclear Kitchen (2008)
- Resonate (2016)

=== Chickenfoot ===
- Chickenfoot (2009)
- Chickenfoot III (2011)

=== Chad Smith's Bombastic Meatbats ===
- Meet the Meatbats (2009)
- More Meat (2010)
- Live Meat And Potatoes (2012)

=== Joe Satriani ===
- What Happens Next (2018) (Smith performs drums on every track)

=== Josh Klinghoffer ===
- "Jeepster/Monolith" (2019) (Record Store Day exclusive 7" with Klinghoffer)

=== Ozzy Osbourne ===
- Ordinary Man (2020) (Smith performs drums on every track and co-wrote all of the songs)
- Patient Number 9 (2022) (Smith performs drums on every track and co-wrote nine songs)
- Ozzy Osbourne: No Escape From Now (2025) (Paramount+ documentary film)
- Back to the Beginning: Ozzy's Final Bow (2026) (theatrical film)

=== Collaborative albums ===
- Rhythm Train with Leslie Bixler, Chad Smith and Featuring Dick Van Dyke – (2010)
- The Process, with Jon Batiste and Bill Laswell (2014)
- Earthling – Eddie Vedder (2021–2022) (Smith co-wrote the music in seven songs and performs the drums on nine tracks)

=== Other appearances ===
- Pharroh (1982)
- Toby Redd – In the Light (1986)
- Second Self – Mood Ring (1990)
- Session Man (TV short) (1991)
- Twenty Mondays – Twist Inside (1992)
- Queen Remix (1991)
- Johnny Cash – "Bird on a Wire" (song appears on Cash's American Recordings album) (1994)
- Wild Colonials – Fruit of Life (1994)
- A Means to an End: The Music of Joy Division (as a member of the group Honeymoon Stitch) (1995)
- Grace of My Heart (1996)
- Wayne Kramer – Dangerous Madness (1996)
- Private Parts: The Album (1997) (Band, minus Anthony Kiedis, performs with LL Cool J on the song "I Make My Own Rules") (1997)
- Lili Haydn – Lili (1997)
- John Fogerty – Blue Moon Swamp (1997)
- Leah Andreone – Alchemy (1998)
- Fishbone – The Psychotic Friends Nuttwerk (2000)
- Loud Rocks (2000)
- Dayna Manning – Shades (2002)
- Hughes Turner Project – HTP 2 (2003)
- Johnny Cash – "Heart of Gold" (song appears on Cash's Unearthed box set) (2003)
- John Frusciante – Shadows Collide with People (2004)
- Dixie Chicks – Taking The Long Way (2006)
- George Clinton and His Gangsters of Love (George Clinton album. Band performs on the song "Let the Good Times Roll") (2008)
- B'z – Ichibu to Zenbu/Dive (2009)
- Brandi Carlile - Give Up the Ghost (2009)
- Paul Oakenfold – Pop Killer (2010)
- Kid Rock – Born Free (2010)
- Flea – Helen Burns (2012)
- The Avett Brothers – The Carpenter (2012)
- Steve Lukather – Transition (2013)
- Sammy Hagar – Sammy Hagar & Friends (2013)
- Jake Bugg – Shangri La (2013)
- Jennifer Nettles – That Girl (2014)
- Rammstein – Rammstein in Amerika (2015)
- Andrew Watt – Ghost in My Head (2015)
- Tarja Turunen – The Brightest Void (2016)
- Tarja Turunen – The Shadow Self (2016)
- The Lego Batman Movie Soundtrack (2017)
- Charlie Puth - "Mother" (2019)
- Lana Del Rey – Norman Fucking Rockwell! (2019)
- Charli XCX – Charli (2019)
- Post Malone – Hollywood's Bleeding (2019)
- Halsey – Manic (2020)
- Dua Lipa – Future Nostalgia (2020)
- Morrissey – I Am Not a Dog on a Chain (2020)
- The Chicks – Gaslighter (2020)
- Miley Cyrus (featuring Chad Smith, Elton John and Yo-Yo Ma) – "Nothing Else Matters" (2021)
- Top Gun: Maverick (2022)
- Iggy Pop – Every Loser (2023)
- Morrissey – Bonfire of Teenagers (unreleased)
- Hardy — Good Girl Phase (2024)
- Lady Gaga – Mayhem (2025)
- Elton John and Brandi Carlile – Who Believes in Angels? (2025)
- Brandi Carlile – Returning to Myself (2025)
- Flea – Honora (2026)
- Tarja Turunen – Frisson Noir (2026)
- The Rolling Stones - Foreign Tongues (2026)
