= Soul Mover =

Studio album by Glenn Hughes
- Released: 24 January 2005
- Genres: Hard rock; blue-eyed soul; funk rock
- Length: 60:20; 62:02 (Japanese vsn)
- Labels: Frontiers (Europe); Yamaha (Japan); Sanctuary (US); EMI (Australia)
- Producers: Glenn Hughes; Chad Smith; Fabrizio Grossi

Glenn Hughes chronology
Songs in the Key of Rock (2003)	Soul Mover (2005)	Music for the Divine (2006)

Professional ratings
Review scores
Source	Rating
Allmusic	4/5 stars
revelationz	5/5 stars
MelodicRock	(91%)
PopMatters	7/10 stars

Soul Mover is the tenth studio album by British vocalist/bassist Glenn Hughes, formerly of Deep Purple, Black Sabbath and Trapeze. The album was released on 24 January 2005 by Frontiers, Sanctuary, EMI and Yamaha.

== History ==
Soul Mover, as the name might suggest, strays back into more soulful territory than Hughes previous album, 2003's Songs in the Key of Rock. However Hughes' hard rock and funk leanings are still very evident. The album was Hughes’ best-selling solo record to date, but has been since overtaken by its follow-up Music for the Divine.

This is the first Hughes album to feature Red Hot Chili Peppers drummer Chad Smith on the entirety of the record (Chad performed on one song on 2003's Songs in the Key of Rock). Smith also co-produced the album with Hughes and Fabrizio Grossi.

The album features Hughes’ regular guitarist JJ Marsh, who co-wrote the majority of the songs with Hughes. Other musicians include keyboardist Ed Roth and former Jane's Addiction and Red Hot Chili Peppers guitarist Dave Navarro, who plays lead guitar on the title track.

A video for the song Soul Mover was recorded; it featured Hughes performing the track with Smith and Navarro in the California desert. This video was included as an enhanced bonus track on all versions of the album and received some airplay on TV music channels including The Amp in the UK.

The Japanese version of the album included a bonus track entitled Camel Toe Stomp; however this version omitted the song Isolation which featured on all other versions. A two-disc version of the album was released on EMI in Australia in February 2006 (the first Hughes solo album to be issued there). This version contained a bonus studio track, a cover of The Moody Blues Nights in White Satin, featuring Red Hot Chili Peppers guitarist John Frusciante, this was originally included on the soundtrack to the 2005 film Stealth. The bonus CD included seven tracks from the 2004 live album Soulfully Live in the City of Angels and an exclusive interview with Hughes and Smith.

During the supporting tour Hughes claimed that the track High Road had originally been written for someone else and that Chad Smith had convinced him to keep the song for himself. Although Hughes has never publicly stated who it was intended for, some people claim that Hughes has said in passing that he penned it for Lenny Kravitz.

== Track listing ==
1. "Soul Mover" – 4:25 (Hughes)
2. "She Moves Ghostly" – 5:11 (Hughes, Marsh)
3. "High Road" – 4:58 (Hughes)
4. "Orion" – 4:15 (Hughes, Marsh)
5. "Change Yourself" – 4:27 (Hughes)
6. "Let It Go" – 6:47 (Hughes)
7. "Dark Star" – 3:51 (Hughes, Marsh)
8. "Isolation" – 4:36 (Hughes, Marsh) (European and Australian vsn only)
8. "Camel Toe Stomp" – 6:18 (Hughes, Marsh, Smith) (Japanese vsn only)
9. "Land of the Livin' (Wonderland)" – 4:54 (Hughes, Marsh)
10. "Miss Little Insane" – 4:21 (Hughes)
11. "Last Mistake" – 5:04 (Hughes, Marsh)
12. "Don't Let Me Bleed" – 7:31 (Hughes, Marsh)

=== Australian Bonus Track ===
13. "Nights in White Satin" – 4:56 (Hayward)

=== Australian Bonus CD ===
1. "Medusa (live)" – 7:52 (Hughes)
2. "Wherever You Go (live)" – 6:11 (Hughes, Marsh)
3. "Seafull (live)" – 8:29 (Hughes)
4. "Coast To Coast (live)" – 8:23 (Hughes)
5. "Mistreated (live)" – 11:22 (Blackmore, Coverdale,)
6. "Gettin' Tighter (live)" – 10:07 (Bolin, Hughes)
7. "You Keep on Moving (live)" – 8:26 (Coverdale, Hughes)
8. "Exclusive Interview With Glenn Hughes and Chad Smith" – 17:22

== Personnel ==
=== Performers ===
- Glenn Hughes – Vocals/ Bass
- JJ Marsh – Guitars
- Chad Smith – Drums
- Ed Roth – Keyboards
- Dave Navarro – Guitars on track 1, intro on track 2
- John Frusciante – Guitars/ Backing Vocals on track 13

=== Live Tracks ===
- Glenn Hughes – Vocals/ Bass
- JJ Marsh – Guitars
- George Nastos – Guitars
- Chad Smith – Drums
- Ed Roth – Keyboards
- Kevin DuBrow – Backing Vocals
- Alex Ligertwood – Backing Vocals

== Charts ==
Year	Chart	Position
2005	Sweden	48
