= From the Archives Volume I – Incense & Peaches =

Compilation album by Glenn Hughes
- Released: February 2000
- Genre: Soul; funk; pop; rock
- Length: 52:59
- Label: Pink Cloud Records
- Producer: Glenn Hughes; David K. Tedds

From The Archives Volume I – Incense & Peaches is a compilation album by former Deep Purple, Black Sabbath and Trapeze vocalist/ bassist Glenn Hughes. The songs were recorded in various sessions between 1995 and 1998. It was released in 2000 on Hughes’ own Pink Cloud Records.

== History ==
Incense & Peaches is a collection of previously unreleased songs that all have a similar feel to one another. Hughes’ hard rock sounds are not evident on the record and instead his pop, soul and laid-back leanings come to the fore. The songs have much in common with Hughes’ 1995 album Feel, indeed many of the tracks were recorded at the same time as that record.

This was the first album to be released through Hughes’ own Pink Cloud Records. Only a limited number of copies were produced and the album is no longer available to buy through Hughes’ website. It was called Volume I, implying that there would be further albums of rarities to come, but to date, this is the only one.

Various Hughes cohorts performed on the album, including regular guitarist Jocke ‘JJ’ Marsh, guitarists Richie Kotzen and Stevie Salas and Tribe Of Gypsies/ Bruce Dickinson guitarist and songwriter Roy Z.

The song Stoned was also recorded by Richie Kotzen on his 1996 album Wave Of Emotion, Hughes provides backing vocals on that version. The finished version of Push is featured on Feel.

Because of the album’s limited availability there are many counterfeit copies in circulation, often these will be a single CD that includes both Incense and Peaches and Hughes’ hard to find Christmas album A Soulful Christmas.

== Track listing ==
1. "Down The Wire" – 4:13 (1995 – Hughes, Kotzen)
2. "Against The Grain" – 3:55 (1995 – Hughes, Kotzen)
3. "Jackie Got The Call Today" – 5:11 (1998 – Ferguson, Hughes, Zermüehlen)
4. "Jolayne" – 5:32 (1998 – Hughes, Zermüehlen)
5. "Let's Get Together" – 4:48 (1995 – Hughes, Roy Z)
6. "Stoned" – 3:35 (1995 – Hughes, Kotzen)
7. "What Is Your Role?" – 4:52 (1998 – Ferguson, Hughes, Nastos, Zermüehlen)
8. "You Are My Dream!" – 5:12 (1995 – Erickson, Hughes)
9. "Doublelife" – 5:28 (1998 – Ferguson, Hughes, Nastos, Zermüehlen)
10. "Push (LA Demo)" – 4:48 (1995 – Hughes)
11. "Inside & Above" – 4:39 (1997 – Axelsson, Hughes, Marsh)
12. "Hey Ken, Are You Home?" – 0:46 (Hughes)

== Personnel ==
- Glenn Hughes – Vocals, Bass
- Jocke Marsh – Guitars
- Stevie Salas – guitar
- George Nastos – guitar
- Richie Kotzen – guitar
- Roy Z – guitar
- Craig Erickson – guitar
- Gary Ferguson – drums
- Hans Zermüehlen – Keyboards
