= JJ Marsh =

Swedish guitarist and composer

Joakim "JJ" Marsh, born in 1966 is a Swedish guitarist and composer, and is probably best known for his long collaboration with Glenn Hughes.

As a teenager Marsh recorded two albums with Spellbound, Breaking the Spell and Rockin 'Reckless. The band also recorded material for a third album, for which Marsh wrote the songs together with the singer Hasse Fröberg, but they didn't manage to get a record deal and the album wasn't released until some ten years later. Spellbound disbanded in 1988, but they have done a few reunion concerts since that, as late as 2014. In the early 1990s he formed the band Studfarm with singer Janne Hellman.

In 1995, Marsh met Glenn Hughes and began a partnership in which Marsh during the period 1996-2008 co-wrote most of the songs on ten studio albums, apart from Hughes' solo albums also two albums with Joe Lynn Turner in the Hughes Turner Project, abbreviated HTP.

Marsh released his first solo album Music from Planet Marsh in 2005, with fellow musicians Tomas Bodin, Thomas Broman and Kjell Haraldsson, the latter two had both played with Glenn Hughes and HTP. Marsh and Broman later formed the band Bridge to Mars, who released the single In A White Light in 2013, and their first album in 2016. Marsh has also appeared as a guitarist on albums with Phenomena, Tomas Bodin, Mats/Morgan Band and art musician Simon Steensland. After signing to the label DIVISION and releasing his 2005 album - “Music from Planet Marsh” digitally, in September 2019 JJ Marsh performed a brief solo tour in Belgium and the Netherlands.

During the 2020s JJ Marsh and Tomas Bodin have collaborated on a few different projects. The first release is Tomas Bodin's album Ambient Cooking, released in February 2024, featuring Marsh on lead guitar on some of the tracks. The album Elixir, released in September 2024, with the band "Master's Brew", is a blend of many different music styles, with Marsh's guitar and the keyboards of Bodin being in focus.

== Discography ==
=== Solo ===
- Music From Planet Marsh (2005)

=== Bridge to Mars ===
- Bridge to Mars (2016)

=== Spellbound ===
- Breaking the Spell (1984)
- Rockin' Reckless (1985)
- Spellbound (1997)

=== Simon Steensland ===
- The Simon Lonesome Combat Ensemble (1994)
- The Zombie Hunter (1995)
- Led Circus (1999)
- Live Gang-Gang (2004)

=== Mats & Morgan Band ===
- Trends and Other Diseases (1996)

=== Glenn Hughes ===
- Addiction (1996)
- The Way It Is (1999)
- From the Archives Volume I - Incense & Peaches (2000)
- Return of Crystal Karma (2000)
- Building the Machine (2001)
- Songs in the Key of Rock (2003)
- Freak Flag Flyin' (2003) (live)
- Soulfully Live in the City of Angels (2004) (live)
- Soul Mover (2005)
- Music for the Divine (2006)
- Live in Australia (2007) (live)
- First Underground Nuclear Kitchen (2008)

=== Hughes-Turner Project ===
- HTP (2002)
- HTP 2 (2003)

=== Tomas Bodin ===
- Sonic Boulevard (2003)
- I A M (2005)
- You Are (2009)
- Ambient Cooking (2024)
- Elixir (2024)

=== Phenomena ===
- Psycho Fantasy (2006)
