= Soulfully Live in the City of Angels =

Soulfully Live In The City Of Angels

Live album by Glenn Hughes
- Released: September 20, 2004
- Genre: Hard rock, funk
- Length: 94:32
- Label: Frontiers Records; Cleopatra Records (US); Avalon Records (Japan)
- Producer: Glenn Hughes

Professional ratings
Review scores
Source	Rating
Allmusic	link
GetReadyToRock	link
VirtuosityOne	92% link

Soulfully Live In The City Of Angels is a live album and DVD by former Deep Purple, Black Sabbath and Trapeze vocalist/ bassist Glenn Hughes. It was recorded at Sound Image Studio, Hollywood on January 11, 2004 in front of select group of guests. It was released in 2004 on Frontiers Records.

== History ==
This was the second official live solo album to be released by Hughes (third if you include the Live In South America bonus CD that was released with Return Of Crystal Karma). It features a set-list of eleven songs, three from his 2003 solo album Songs In The Key Of Rock, one from his 2001 album Building The Machine, two from the Hughes/Thrall album, two Trapeze tracks and three Deep Purple numbers.

Hughes’ band for the gig included regular guitarist JJ Marsh, additional guitarist George Nastos (who has performed on some of Hughes’ other albums), keyboardist Ed Roth and Red Hot Chili Peppers drummer Chad Smith. Hughes also recruited the singers Alex Ligertwood (formerly of Santana) and the late Kevin DuBrow (of Quiet Riot) to perform backing vocals.

The CD version of the release includes either one or two extra tracks, depending on the origin. All CDs include the previously unreleased song The Healer, which was performed by Hughes alone and features his guitar playing. The European version of the CD includes Change, which was originally featured on the Japanese version of Songs In The Key Of Rock.

A US edition was released in March 2005 which coupled the CDs and the concert DVD into one package.

The CD and DVD rearranged the order of the tracks from the original performance at Sound Image Studios. They also omitted the songs In My Blood and Blue Jade, the reason for their exclusion is unknown.

== Track listing ==
1. "Can't Stop the Flood" – 4:12 (Hughes, Marsh)
2. "Higher Places" – 5:28 (Hughes, Kollman)
3. "Written All Over Your Face" – 9:53 (Hughes, Marsh)
4. "Medusa" – 7:52 (Hughes)
5. "Wherever You Go" – 6:11 (Hughes, Marsh)
6. "Seafull" – 8:29 (Hughes)
7. "Coast to Coast" – 8:23 (Hughes)
8. "First Step of Love" – 5:53 (Hughes, Thrall)
9. "Mistreated" – 11:22 (Blackmore, Coverdale, Hughes)
10. "Gettin' Tighter" – 10:07 (Bolin, Hughes)
11. "You Keep on Moving" – 8:26 (Coverdale, Hughes)

=== CD bonus studio track ===
12. "The Healer" – 3:41 (Hughes)

=== European bonus track ===
13. "Change" – 4:35 (Hughes, Marsh)

== Personnel ==
- Glenn Hughes – vocals, bass
- JJ Marsh – guitars
- George Nastos – guitar
- Chad Smith – drums
- Ed Roth – keyboards
- Kevin DuBrow – background vocals
- Alex Ligertwood – background vocals
