= List of Madrasta episodes =

Madrasta (International title: A Place in Your Heart / transl. Stepmother) is a 2019 Philippine drama television series broadcast by GMA Network. The series aired on the network's Afternoon Prime line up and worldwide on GMA Pinoy TV from October 7, 2019 to February 21, 2020, replacing Dahil sa Pag-ibig.

NUTAM (Nationwide Urban Television Audience Measurement) People in Television Homes ratings are provided by AGB Nielsen Philippines while Kantar Media Philippines provide Nationwide ratings (Urban + Rural).

The series ended, but it's the 20th-week run, and with 100 episodes. It was replaced by Bilangin Ang Bituin Sa Langit.

== Series overview ==
Season	Episodes	Originally released	
Season	Episodes	First released	Last released
1	100	October 7, 2019	February 21, 2020

== Episodes ==
No. overall	No. in season	Title	Social media hashtag	Original release date	AGB Nielsen Ratings (NUTAM People)	Timeslot rank
1	1	"Pilot"	#Madrasta	October 7, 2019	5.2%	#2
2	2	"Savior"	#MadrastaSavior	October 8, 2019	5.8%	#2
3	3	"Lihim" (transl. Secret)	#MadrastaLihim	October 9, 2019	6.0%	#2
4	4	"Audrey 143"	#MadrastaAudrey143	October 10, 2019	6.3%	#2
5	5	"Fake Truth"	#MadrastaFakeTruth	October 11, 2019	6.3%	#2
6	6	"Secret Lover"	#MadrastaSecretLover	October 14, 2019	4.0%	#2
7	7	"Halik" (transl. Kiss)	#MadrastaHalik	October 15, 2019	3.8%	#2
8	8	"Takas" (transl. Escape)	#MadrastaTakas	October 16, 2019	4.9%	#2
9	9	"Wanted"	#MadrastaWanted	October 17, 2019	6.3%	#2
10	10	"Help"	#MadrastaHelp	October 18, 2019	6.3%	#2
11	11	"Yakap" (transl. Hug)	#MadrastaYakap	October 21, 2019	6.3%	#2
12	12	"Suspetsa" (transl. Suspect)	#MadrastaSuspetsa	October 22, 2019	6.1%	#1
13	13	"Audrey vs. Judy"	#MadrastaAudreyVsJudy	October 23, 2019	5.8%	#2
14	14	"Away" (transl. Fight)	#MadrastaAway	October 24, 2019	6.3%	#2
15	15	"Angelina Cruz"	#MadrastaAngelinaCruz	October 25, 2019	4.8%	#2
16	16	"Sampal" (transl. Slap)	#MadrastaSampal	October 28, 2019	5.2%	#2
17	17	"Killer"	#MadrastaKiller	October 29, 2019	5.8%	#2
18	18	"Audrey Ver. 2"	#MadrastaAudreyVer2	October 30, 2019	5.8%	#2
19	19	"Halik" (transl. Kiss)	#MadrastaHalik	October 31, 2019	5.2%	#2
20	20	"Pag-amin" (transl. Confession)	#MadrastaPagAmin	November 1, 2019	5.8%	#2
21	21	"The Mommy"	#MadrastaTheMommy	November 4, 2019	5.0%	#2
22	22	"Nakakadiri" (transl. Disgusting)	#MadrastaNakakadiri	November 5, 2019	5.1%	#2
23	23	"Bayad Utang" (transl. Pay Debt)	#MadrastaBayadUtang	November 6, 2019	5.5%	#2
24	24	"Elizabeth vs. Audrey"	#MadrastaElizabethVsAudrey	November 7, 2019	5.5%	#2
25	25	"Katharine is Back"	#MadrastaKatharineIsBack	November 8, 2019	5.8%	#2
26	26	"Salpukan" (transl. Brawl)	#MadrastaSalpukan	November 11, 2019	5.0%	#2
27	27	"This is War"	#MadrastaThisIsWar	November 12, 2019	5.0%	#2
28	28	"The Clash"	#MadrastaTheClash	November 13, 2019	5.0%	#2
29	29	"Gatecrasher"	#MadrastaGatecrasher	November 14, 2019	5.2%	#2
30	30	"Eskandalo" (transl. Scandal)	#MadrastaEskandalo	November 15, 2019	3.8%	#2
31	31	"Love You, Goodbye"	#MadrastaLoveYouGoodbye	November 18, 2019	4.0%	#2
32	32	"Hinagpis" (transl. Sorrow)	#MadrastaHinagpis	November 19, 2019	4.8%	#2
33	33	"Pasabog" (transl. Explosion)	#MadrastaPasabog	November 20, 2019	5.2%	#2
34	34	"RIP, Katharine"	#MadrastaRIPKatharine	November 21, 2019	5.2%	#2
35	35	"Revenge is Coming"	#MadrastaRevengeIsComing	November 22, 2019	5.8%	#2
36	36	"Will You Marry Me?"	#MadrastaWillYouMarryMe	November 25, 2019	4.2%	#2
37	37	"Patayin sa Sindak si Audrey" (transl. Kill Audrey with Fear)	#MadrastaPatayinSaSindakSiAudrey	November 26, 2019	4.2%	#2
38	38	"Chandelier"	#MadrastaChandelier	November 27, 2019	5.2%	#2
39	39	"Kill Joy"	#MadrastaKillJoy	November 28, 2019	5.1%	#2
40	40	"Missing Bride"	#MadrastaMissingBride	November 29, 2019	5.5%	#1
41	41	"Escape"	#MadrastaEscape	December 2, 2019	6.0%	#1
42	42	"Huli Ka" (transl. You're Caught)	#MadrastaHuliKa	December 3, 2019	7.9%	#1
43	43	"Sean vs. Katharine"	#MadrastaSeanVsKatharine	December 4, 2019	6.0%	#1
44	44	"Pagtatangka" (transl. Attempt)	#MadrastaPagtatangka	December 5, 2019	5.7%	#2
45	45	"Face to Face"	#MadrastaFaceToFace	December 6, 2019	4.9%	#1
46	46	"Secrets and Lies"	#MadrastaSecretsAndLies	December 9, 2019	4.6%	#1
47	47	"Fake Wife"	#MadrastaFakeWife	December 10, 2019	4.7%	#2
48	48	"Queen Katharine"	#MadrastaQueenKatharine	December 11, 2019	4.6%	#2
49	49	"Birthday Basher"	#MadrastaBirthdaybasher	December 12, 2019	4.8%	#1
50	50	"Audrey is Back"	#MadrastaAudreyIsBack	December 13, 2019	5.0%	#2
51	51	"Madrasta vs. Maldita" (transl. Stepmother vs. Rude Mother)	#MadrastaVsMaldita	December 16, 2019	4.8%	#2
52	52	"Laban, Audrey" (transl. Fight, Audrey)	#MadrastaLabanAudrey	December 17, 2019	5.7%	#1
53	53	"Rampa" (transl. Ramp)	#MadrastaRampa	December 18, 2019	6.6%	#1
54	54	"Grand Entrance"	#MadrastaGrandEntrance	December 19, 2019	6.1%	#1
55	55	"Peligrosa" (transl. Dangerous)	#MadrastaPeligrosa	December 20, 2019	6.6%	#1
56	56	"Temptation Island"	#MadrastaTemptationIsland	December 23, 2019	6.1%	#1
57	57	"Affair"	#MadrastaAffair	December 24, 2019	4.8%	#1
58	58	"Legal Wife"	#MadrastaLegalWife	December 25, 2019	5.6%	#1
59	59	"Pasko Na, Sinira Ko" (transl. It's Christmas, Destroyed by Me)	#MadrastaPaskoNaSiniraKo	December 26, 2019	5.8%	#1
60	60	"Desire"	#MadrastaDesire	December 27, 2019	5.9%	#1
61	61	"Mapusok" (transl. Plump)	#MadrastaMapusok	December 30, 2019	5.4%	#1
62	62	"Selos" (transl. Jealous)	#MadrastaSelos	December 31, 2019	4.9%	#1
63	63	"New Year Laban" (transl. New Year Fight})	#MadrastaNewYearLaban	January 1, 2020	4.4%	#2
64	64	"Dukot" (transl. Abduct)	#MadrastaDukot	January 2, 2020	6.0%	#2
65	65	"Eskapo" (transl. Getaway)	#MadrastaEskapo	January 3, 2020	6.3%	#1
66	66	"Panic Mode"	#MadrastaPanicMode	January 6, 2020	6.0%	#1
67	67	"Akusada" (transl. Accused)	#MadrastaAkusada	January 7, 2020	5.9%	#1
68	68	"George Ver. 2"	#MadrastaGeorgeVer2	January 8, 2020	6.2%	#1
69	69	"Sagip" (transl. Rescue)	#MadrastaSagip	January 9, 2020	5.6%	#1
70	70	"Sapul" (transl. Target)	#MadrastaSapul	January 10, 2020	6.9%	#1
71	71	"Taranta" (transl. Panic)	#MadrastaTaranta	January 13, 2020	7.6%	#1
72	72	"Pagtugis" (transl. Pursuit)	#MadrastaPagtugis	January 14, 2020	6.7%	#1
73	73	"Escape Plan"	#MadrastaEscapePlan	January 15, 2020	6.8%	#1
74	74	"Putukan" (transl. Bang)	#MadrastaPutukan	January 16, 2020	7.0%	#1
75	75	"Surrender"	#MadrastaSurrender	January 17, 2020	6.0%	#1
76	76	"Buntis" (transl. Pregnant)	#MadrastaBuntis	January 20, 2020	5.9%	#1
77	77	"Bagong Alas" (transl. New Ace)	#MadrastaBagongAlas	January 21, 2020	5.8%	#1
78	78	"Fake Drama"	#MadrastaFakeDrama	January 22, 2020	5.5%	#1
79	79	"Agawan Kay Sean" (transl. Eyeing For Sean)	#MadrastaAgawanKaySean	January 23, 2020	5.1%	#1
80	80	"Harana" (transl. Serenade)	#MadrastaHarana	January 24, 2020	5.6%	#1
81	81	"Sugod" (transl. Attack)	#MadrastaSugod	January 27, 2020	5.5%	#1
82	82	"Kasabwat" (transl. Conspirator)	#MadrastaKasabwat	January 28, 2020	6.2%	#1
83	83	"Cat Fight"	#MadrastaCatFight	January 29, 2020	5.8%	#1
84	84	"Kabado" (transl. Nervous)	#MadrastaKabado	January 30, 2020	6.3%	#1
85	85	"Assault"	#MadrastaAssault	January 31, 2020	5.7%	#1
86	86	"Ex-lover"	#MadrastaExLover	February 3, 2020	5.8%	#1
87	87	"Shocking Night"	#MadrastaShockingNight	February 4, 2020	4.9%	#2
88	88	"Trauma"	#MadrastaTrauma	February 5, 2020	6.0%	#1
89	89	"Praning" (transl. Crazy)	#MadrastaPraning	February 6, 2020	5.4%	#2
90	90	"Sino Ang Ama?" (transl. Who's The Father?)	#MadrastaSinoAngAma	February 7, 2020	5.8%	#1
91	91	"Paternity Test"	#MadrastaPaternityTest	February 10, 2020	6.2%	#1
92	92	"Big Reveal"	#MadrastaBigReveal	February 11, 2020	5.8%	#1
93	93	"Instant Karma"	#MadrastaInstantKarma	February 12, 2020	6.5%	#1
94	94	"Preggy Wars"	#MadrastaPreggyWars	February 13, 2020	6.7%	#1
95	95	"Sweet Revenge"	#MadrastaSweetRevenge	February 14, 2020	6.7%	#1
96	96	"The Switch"	#MadrastaTheSwitch	February 17, 2020	6.0%	#1
97	97	"Mastermind"	#MadrastaMastermind	February 18, 2020	6.9%	#1
98	98	"Balat-kayo" (transl. Disguise)	#MadrastaBalatkayo	February 19, 2020	6.6%	#1
99	99	"Final Battle"	#MadrastaFinalBattle	February 20, 2020	6.6%	#1
100	100	"Finale"	#MadrastaFinale	February 21, 2020	7.5%	#1
