= Music for the Divine =

Studio album by Glenn Hughes
- Released: 9 June 2006
- Genres: Funk rock; blue-eyed soul; hard rock
- Length: 52:13; 61:45 (Australian version)
- Labels: Frontiers (Europe); Yamaha (Japan); Demolition Records (US); Sony BMG (Australia)
- Producers: Glenn Hughes & Chad Smith

Glenn Hughes chronology
Soul Mover (2005)	Music for the Divine (2006)	First Underground Nuclear Kitchen (2008)

Professional ratings
Review scores
Source	Rating
Allmusic	4/5 stars

Music for the Divine is the eleventh studio album by former Deep Purple, Black Sabbath and Trapeze vocalist/ bassist Glenn Hughes. The album was released on 9 June 2006 by Frontiers, Demolition, Sony BMG and Yamaha.

== History ==
Music for the Divine, the follow-up to 2005's Soul Mover marked a continued increase in Hughes' popularity. The album contains a more varied approach than his previous albums, songs like "Steppin' On", "Too High" and "Monkey Man" follow Hughes' regular style of funk infused hard rock, but other songs like "Frail" and "The Divine" are mellower and lean towards acoustic songwriting. There is a heavy use of acoustic guitar on many of the tracks as well as some orchestration.

This is the second Hughes album to feature Red Hot Chili Peppers drummer Chad Smith on the entirety of the record. The record was also co-produced by Smith and was recorded at his home in the Hollywood Hills; the album artwork features pictures taken during the recording process.

The album features Hughes' regular guitarist JJ Marsh, who co-wrote the majority of the songs with Hughes. Other performances come from South African composer Mark Kilian who arranged the string sections and played keyboards and Chad Smith's Red Hot Chili Peppers' bandmate John Frusciante, who plays guitar on two tracks.

Music for the Divine was mixed by Ryan Hewitt, who has also worked with Red Hot Chili Peppers, Frusciante, Blink-182, Alkaline Trio and many others.

The European version of the album includes a cover of the Moody Blues song "Nights in White Satin", featuring Frusciante. This was originally featured on the soundtrack for the 2005 film Stealth and also appeared on the Australian version of Soul Mover. The version on Music for the Divine is a slightly different mix. The Japanese version includes a bonus track, which is an acoustic rough version of "This House".

The Australian version, released in 2007 included two bonus tracks, the first is a different version of "Monkey Man" which features Australian singer Jimmy Barnes performing backing vocals. The second bonus track is a cover of Led Zeppelin’s "Misty Mountain Hop", which was recorded in 2005 with Alice in Chains guitarist Jerry Cantrell.

Promotional videos were shot for the songs "This House", "The Divine" and "Monkey Man" (which featured Barnes). The "Monkey Man" video was included on the Australian version of the album as an enhanced track.

== Track listing ==
1. "The Valiant Denial" – 6:50 (Hughes, Marsh)
2. "Steppin' On" – 4:42 (Hughes, Marsh)
3. "Monkey Man" – 4:25 (Hughes, Marsh)
4. "This House" – 3:53 (Hughes, Marsh, Smith)
5. "You Got Soul" – 4:20 (Hughes, Marsh)
6. "Frail" – 4:42 (Hughes)
7. "Black Light" – 3:56 (Hughes, Marsh)
8. "Nights in White Satin" – 4:55 (Justin Hayward) (European edition only)
9. "Too High" – 4:50 (Hughes, Marsh)
10. "This Is How I Feel" – 5:35 (Hughes)
11. "The Divine" – 4:05 (Hughes)

=== Japanese Bonus Track ===
12. "The Writing Session of "This House"" – (Hughes, Marsh, Smith)

=== Australian Bonus Tracks ===
12. "Monkey Man" (featuring Jimmy Barnes) – 4:25 (Hughes, Marsh)
13. "Misty Mountain Hop" – 5:07 (Page, Plant, Jones)

== Personnel ==
- Glenn Hughes – vocals, acoustic guitar, bass
- JJ Marsh – guitar
- Chad Smith – Drums
- Mark Kilian – keyboards, string arrangements
- John Frusciante – guitar on tracks 8 and 10, background vocals on track 8
- Jerry Cantrell – guitar on track 13
