= The Way It Is (Glenn Hughes album) =

Studio album by Glenn Hughes
- Released: March 1999
- Recorded: October 1998
- Genres: Hard rock; funk rock
- Length: 60:45
- Labels: SPV (Europe); Nippon Crown (Japan); Shrapnel (US)
- Producers: Glenn Hughes; Michael Scott

Glenn Hughes chronology
Addiction (1996)	The Way It Is (1999)	Return of Crystal Karma (2000)

Alternative Cover
- US Cover

Professional ratings
Review scores
Source	Rating
AllMusic	3/5 stars

The Way It Is is the sixth studio album by former Deep Purple, Black Sabbath and Trapeze vocalist/ bassist Glenn Hughes. It was released in March 1999 by Nippon Crown, SPV and Shrapnel Records.

== History ==
While Hughes' previous album, Addiction (1996), had a dramatic and heavy sound with songs that focused on the turmoil in his life, its follow-up, The Way It Is, has a distinctly lighter tone. The metal edge of Addiction is absent here, replaced with a funk-infused one. Unlike 1995's Feel, which had funk, pop, and soul sounds, The Way It Is showcases the hard rock Hughes is best known for.

This was Hughes' second album to feature long-time guitarist Jocke 'JJ' Marsh; the two of them worked closely on the album, locking themselves away in Hughes' Los Angeles home in November 1998. The album also features two songs co-written with funk guitarist Stevie Salas and performed by Hughes, Salas and former Guns N' Roses, now Velvet Revolver drummer Matt Sorum. The three of them had originally planned to put an album together, but this did not appear. "You Kill Me" and "Second Son" are the only tracks by the three of them to be released.

Other musicians on the album include guitarist-keyboardist Marc Bonilla, who worked closely with Hughes on Addiction, but has a lesser role on this album. Keith Emerson provides organ parts on two songs and Hughes' usual drummer of the period, Gary Ferguson, performs on all the non-Salas/Sorum numbers.

A cover of Jimi Hendrix's "Freedom" (originally from The Cry of Love) is featured on the album and an additional remix of the song appears at the end of the record, although it is not listed on the album sleeve-notes.

== Track listing ==
1. "The Way It Is" – 5:44 (Sampo Axelsson, Hughes, Marsh)
2. "You Kill Me" – 3:31 (Hughes, Salas)
3. "Neverafter" – 5:13 (Hughes, Marsh)
4. "Rain On Me" – 5:26 (Hughes, Marsh)
5. "Curse" – 4:49 (Axelsson, Hughes, Marsh)
6. "Freedom" – 4:18 (Hendrix)
7. "The Truth Will Set Me Free" – 3:38 (Hughes, Marsh)
8. "Stoned In The Temple" – 4:08 (Bonilla, Hughes)
9. "Too Far Gone" – 4:54 (Hughes, Marsh)
10. "Second Son" – 3:39 (Hughes, Salas)
11. "Take You Down" – 4:35 (Hughes, Marsh)
12. "Don't Look Away" – 5:37 (Axelsson, Hughes, Marsh)
13. "Freedom (Shagmeister Mix)" – 5:10 (Hendrix)

== Personnel ==
- Glenn Hughes – vocals, Bass
- Joakim Marsh – guitars on all except tracks 2, 8, 10
- Marc Bonilla – guitar, keyboards, strings on tracks 1, 3, 4, 5, 8, 9, 12
- Gary Ferguson – drums on all except tracks 2 & 10
- Hans Zermüehlen – keyboards on tracks 3, 4, 5, 11

Special guests:

- Stevie Salas – guitars on tracks 2 & 10
- Matt Sorum – drums on tracks 2 & 10
- Keith Emerson – Organ on tracks 8 & 12
- George Nastos – Street Funk Guitar on track 11
