= Addiction (Glenn Hughes album) =

Studio album by Glenn Hughes
- Released: 10 July 1996
- Genres: Hard rock, heavy metal
- Length: 50:27; 70:28 (US version)
- Labels: SPV (Europe); Zero Corporation (Japan); Shrapnel (US)
- Producers: Glenn Hughes; Marc Bonilla; Michael Scott

Glenn Hughes chronology
Feel (1995)	Addiction (1996)	The Way It Is (1999)

Professional ratings
Review scores
Source	Rating
MelodicRock.com	(90%)

Addiction is the fifth studio album by former Deep Purple, Black Sabbath and Trapeze vocalist/bassist Glenn Hughes. The album was released on 10 July 1996 by Zero Corporation, SPV and Shrapnel.

== History ==
Unlike 1994's Feel, which had a lighter sound with definite pop, soul and funk influences, Addiction was a definite hard rock record, at times bordering on heavy metal. It is generally considered Hughes' heaviest solo album, both musically and topically. Hughes describes the period of his life when he made the album as a dark one; various issues he was going through are addressed in the songs. Many of them focus on the drug addictions that marred Hughes’ life throughout the 80s.

Guitarist and songwriter Marc Bonilla had a major contribution on the album, performing, co-producing and co-writing nine of the ten songs. This is Hughes' first album to feature long-time guitarist and co-songwriter Joakim 'JJ' Marsh. Marsh (from Sweden) has played guitar on every subsequent Hughes solo album to date and has toured with him on many occasions.

The US version of the album was issued with three bonus live tracks; these consisted of two Trapeze songs—"Way Back to the Bone" (from You Are the Music...We're Just the Band) and "Touch My Life" (from Medusa)—as well as the Deep Purple song You Fool No One (from Burn).

The track Talk About It was subsequently released as a single in the form on the Talk About It EP, a CD which included three previously unreleased live tracks.

== Track listing ==
1. "Death Of Me" – 3:46 (Bonilla)
2. "Down" – 4:43 (Axelsson, Bonilla, Hughes, Marsh)
3. "Addiction" – 4:26 (Bonilla, Hughes)
4. "Madeleine" – 4:48 (Axelsson, Bonilla, Hughes, Marsh)
5. "Talk About It" – 4:48 (Bonilla, Hughes)
6. "I'm Not Your Slave" – 3:51 (Bonilla, Hughes)
7. "Cover Me" – 4:52 (Bonilla, Hughes)
8. "Blue Jade" – 7:14 (Hughes, Marsh)
9. "Justified Man" – 3:41 (Bonilla, Hughes)
10. "I Don't Want To Live That Way Again" – 8:18 (Bonilla, Hughes)

=== US bonus tracks ===
11. "Way Back To The Bone (live)" – 6:34 (Hughes)
12. "Touch My Life (live)" – 4:34 (Galley, Galley)
13. "You Fool No One (live)" – 8:53 (Blackmore, Coverdale, Hughes, Lord, Paice)

The Japanese release has a different running order of the tracks: 6,7,3,4,5,1,2,8,9,10.

== Personnel ==
=== Studio tracks ===
- Glenn Hughes – vocals, bass
- Marc Bonilla – guitars, keyboards
- Joakim Marsh – guitars
- Joe Travers – drums
- R. Gaylor – vocal channeling
- Ronnie Montrose – slide guitar on "Justified Man"

=== Live bonus tracks ===
- Glenn Hughes – vocals
- Joakim Marsh – guitars
- Sampo Axelsson – bass
- Morgan Ågren – drums
- Lasse Pollack – keyboards
