= Building the Machine =

Studio album by Glenn Hughes
- Released: 24 September 2001
- Genre: Funk rock
- Length: 53:39; 58:28 (Japanese version)
- Labels: SPV (Europe); Nippon Crown (Japan); DNA (US)
- Producers: Glenn Hughes; Michael Scott

Glenn Hughes chronology
| Return of Crystal Karma (2000) | Building the Machine (2001) | Songs in the Key of Rock (2003) |

Professional ratings
Review scores
| Source | Rating |
|---|---|
| Allmusic | 3/5 stars |

Building the Machine is the eighth studio album by former Deep Purple, Black Sabbath and Trapeze vocalist/ bassist Glenn Hughes. The album was released on 24 September 2001 by SPV, DNA and Nippon Crown.

== History ==
Building The Machine has a similar feel to Hughes’ previous album, 2000’s Return of Crystal Karma. Many of the songs have a hard rock sound with a funk edge, although the funk aspect is somewhat toned down on this album and the songs are more driven by guitar riffs than bass lines.

This album marks the fourth collaboration between Hughes and longtime guitarist and co-songwriter JJ Marsh. The album also features contributions from Hughes’ regular drummer of the period Gary Ferguson, keyboardists Vince DiCola and John Beasley and guitarist Pat Travers, who duets with Hughes on the Rare Earth cover I Just Want To Celebrate. Bobby Kimball of Toto provides backing vocals on two of the tracks.

The track High Ball Shooter is a newly recorded version of the Deep Purple song, which originally featured on the album Stormbringer.

The Japanese version of the album includes the track Cosmic Spell, which was written by Hughes and Pat Travers.

The opening track Can’t Stop The Flood also kicked off Hughes’ 2004 live album Soulfully Live in the City of Angels and often frequents his set-lists.

== Track listing ==
1. "Can't Stop the Flood" – 4:11 (Hughes, Marsh)
2. "Inside" – 4:52 (Hughes, Marsh)
3. "Out On Me" – 5:32 (Hughes)
4. "I Just Want To Celebrate" – 3:23 (Fekaris, Zesses)
5. "Don't Let it Slip Away" – 4:57 (Hughes, Marsh, Scott)
6. "Feels Like Home" – 4:38 (Crook, Hughes)
7. "High Ball Shooter" – 4:29 (Blackmore, Coverdale, Hughes, Lord, Paice)
8. "When You Fall" – 4:57 (Hughes, Marsh)
9. "I Will Follow You" – 6:11 (Hughes, Marsh)
10. "Beyond the Numb" – 7:51 (Hughes)
11. "Big Sky" – 4:38 (Ellis, Hughes)

=== Japan Bonus Track ===
12. "Cosmic Spell" – 4:49 (Hughes, Travers)

== Personnel ==
- Glenn Hughes – Vocals, Bass
- JJ Marsh – Guitars except tracks 4&11/ Backing Vocals on track 8
- Gary Ferguson – Drums

Special Guests:

- Pat Travers – guitar, vocals on track 4
- Brett Ellis – guitar on track 11
- Vince DiCola – Keyboards except tracks 4&9*
- John Beasley – Keyboards on track 9
- Bobby Kimball – Backing Vocals on tracks 2&5
- Doug Bossi – background vocals on track 8
- David K. Tedds – background vocals on track 4
- Lol Tolhurst – background vocals on track 4
- Cindy Tolhurst – background vocals on track 4
