= Songs in the Key of Rock =

Studio album by Glenn Hughes
- Released: 9 June 2003
- Genres: Hard rock, funk
- Length: 52:44 (European vsn); 53:34 (Japanese vsn)
- Labels: Frontiers (Europe); Pony Canyon (Japan)
- Producers: Glenn Hughes; Jeff Kollman

Glenn Hughes chronology
Building the Machine (2001)	Songs in the Key of Rock (2003)	Soul Mover (2005)

Professional ratings
Review scores
Source	Rating
Allmusic	3.5/5 stars
MelodicRock	(94%)

Songs in the Key of Rock is the ninth studio album by former Deep Purple, Black Sabbath and Trapeze vocalist/bassist Glenn Hughes. The album was released on 9 June 2003 by Frontiers and Pony Canyon.

== History ==
Songs in the Key of Rock, named after Stevie Wonder's Songs in the Key of Life, was written in a 'seventies vintage frame of mind', according to Hughes. Although the album features moments of funk, it is predominantly seventies-style hard rock.

The album features Hughes’ regular guitarist JJ Marsh and is his last album to date to include drummer Gary Ferguson, who has played on five of Hughes solo records. Other musicians include guitarist and producer, Jeff Kollman, keyboardist Ed Roth, former Santana vocalist Alex Ligertwood, bassist Billy Sheehan, and Red Hot Chili Peppers drummer Chad Smith on 'Get You Stoned'. Kollman, Roth, and Smith would eventually form the all-instrumental band Chad Smith's Bombastic Meatbats in 2007.

This marked the first occasion Chad Smith performed on one of Hughes’ albums. "I said, 'Deep Purple Glenn Hughes? Not the dead guy from the Village People – may he rest in peace?'" said Smith. "I would have played with him too, but he's dead." Smith is now Hughes’ regular drummer for his studio work.

The track Higher Places was written as a tribute to the late Led Zeppelin drummer John Bonham, who was a fan of Hughes’ first band Trapeze and used to jam with them on occasion at gigs .

Two versions of the album were released. The European version includes the bonus track Secret Life, while the Japanese edition features a song entitled Change. Change was also included on the European version of Hughes’ 2004 live album Soulfully Live in the City of Angels. Both these tracks are listed as track nine in their respective versions.

An unlisted short reprise of the song Higher Places is featured at the end of the album.

== Track listing ==
1. "In My Blood" – 4:39 (Hughes, Marsh)
2. "Lost in the Zone" – 4:26 (Hughes, Kollman, Marsh)
3. "Gasoline" – 3:10 (Hughes, Marsh)
4. "Higher Places (Song for Bonzo)" – 5:04 (Hughes, Kollman)
5. "Get You Stoned" – 4:49 (Hughes, Kollman)
6. "Written All Over Your Face" – 8:33 (Hughes, Marsh)
7. "Standing on the Rock" – 3:46 (Hughes, Kollman)
8. "Courageous" – 4:25 (Hughes)
9. "Secret Life" – 3:45 (Hughes, Marsh) (European vsn only)
9. "Change" – 4:35 (Hughes, Marsh) (Japanese vsn only)
10. "The Truth" – 3:28 (Hughes)
11. "Wherever You Go" – 5:31 (Hughes, Marsh)
12. "Higher Places (reprise)" – 1:08 (Hughes, Kollman)

== Personnel ==
- Glenn Hughes – Vocals, Bass
- JJ Marsh – Guitars
- Jeff Kollman – guitar
- Gary Ferguson – drums except track 5
- Ed Roth – keyboards
- Alex Ligertwood – background vocals
- Billy Sheehan – bass on Change
- Chad Smith – drums on track 5
