= Glenn Hughes (musician) =

English bassist and singer (born 1951)

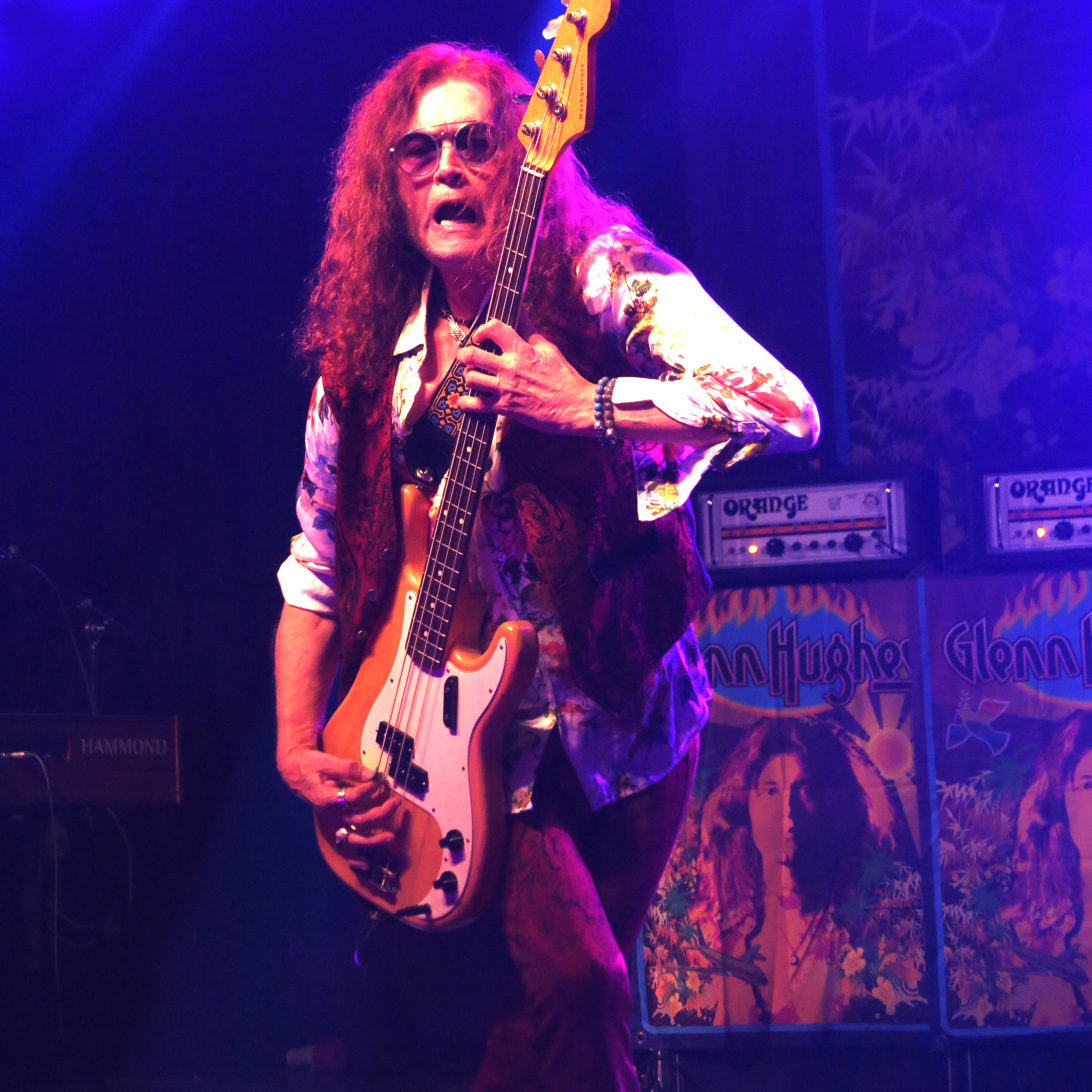
- Hughes performing in 2018

Background information
- Born: 21 August 1951 (age 75); Cannock, Staffordshire, England
- Genres: Hard rock; funk rock; blues rock; blue-eyed soul; heavy metal; progressive rock
- Occupations: Musician; singer; songwriter; producer
- Instruments: Vocals; bass guitar
- Years active: 1967–present
- Labels: Frontiers; Pony Canyon; SPV; Yamaha; Zero
- Member of: Black Country Communion
- Formerly of: Finders Keepers; Trapeze; Deep Purple; Hughes/Thrall; Black Sabbath; Phenomena; Hughes Turner Project; Michael Men Project; Kings of Chaos; California Breed; The Dead Daisies
- Website: glennhughes.com

Glenn Hughes (born 21 August 1951) is an English musician, best known as the bassist and singer in the hard rock band Trapeze and as a member of Deep Purple in the lineups known to fans as Mk. III and IV, as well as briefly fronting Black Sabbath in the mid-1980s. Hughes is renowned for his funk inspired bass playing and his soulful and wide-ranging countertenor vocal range.

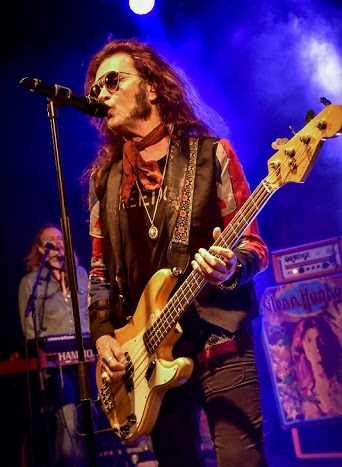
Hughes performing in 2019

In addition to being an active session musician, Hughes maintains a notable solo career. He fronts the supergroup Black Country Communion, and fronted California Breed from 2013 to 2015 and The Dead Daisies from 2019 to 2023. In 2016, Hughes was inducted into the Rock and Roll Hall of Fame as a member of Deep Purple.

== Early life ==
Hughes was born in Cannock, Staffordshire, England, on 21 August 1951. He fronted Finders Keepers in the 1960s as bassist/vocalist.

== Career ==
=== Trapeze, Deep Purple, Hughes and Thrall (1973–1982) ===
Hughes fronted the British funk rock band Trapeze. He was the bassist and lead vocalist for the first three Trapeze albums, released between 1970 and 1972. He is also credited with contributing guitar, piano and trombone to these albums.

Hughes was recruited to replace Roger Glover as bassist in Deep Purple in 1973, though he considered himself more a vocalist than a bassist. He was reportedly uninterested in the Deep Purple job until some of the other members proposed that Paul Rodgers of Free be brought in as co-lead vocalist.

Although the recruitment of Rodgers fell through, Hughes became interested in the "two-lead-singer thing", and David Coverdale was added as Deep Purple's lead vocalist. The two would ultimately share lead vocal duties for the next three albums, until Deep Purple founder members Ian Paice and Jon Lord dissolved the band after a 1976 gig in Liverpool due to the drug-fuelled antics of Hughes and guitarist Tommy Bolin.

During his time in Deep Purple, Hughes participated with Coverdale, Lord, Paice and others in Roger Glover's recording and concert of The Butterfly Ball In 2016, Hughes was inducted into the Rock and Roll Hall of Fame as a member of Deep Purple.

Battling a severe cocaine addiction, Hughes then embarked on a solo career, releasing his first solo album in 1977, titled Play Me Out.

In 1982, he joined with ex-Pat Travers and Automatic Man guitarist Pat Thrall to form Hughes/Thrall. They released the self-title Hughes/Thrall album) which though critically acclaimed went virtually unnoticed at the time due to various issues including the duo's inability to support it with a proper tour because Hughes and Thrall were both suffering from drug addiction. As Hughes stated in a 2007 interview, "The Hughes-Thrall album was a brilliant, brilliant album, but we only did 17 shows because we were too loaded." A second album was started though never completed. The duo later reunited on various occasions including Thrall appearing on Hughes's Feel album and a couple newly recorded acoustic tracks added to the Hughes-Thrall reissue.

=== Gary Moore, Black Sabbath and health problems (1983–1990) ===
In the mid-1980s, Hughes recorded several different albums with bands and artists including Phenomena (Phenomena, Phenomena II: Dream Runner), Gary Moore (Run for Cover), and Black Sabbath (Seventh Star; originally a solo album by Sabbath guitarist Tony Iommi that was released as a Sabbath album due to record label pressure).

Hughes' health problems due to overeating, drugs and alcohol began to seriously affect his musical projects and this contributed to very short stints with Gary Moore and Tony Iommi, as Hughes was unable to tour with them properly due to his poor health. After firing Hughes, Moore noted that the singer was incapable as he had "half of Peru stuffed up his nose." In 1985 Black Sabbath reunited with original vocalist Ozzy Osbourne for their one-off Live Aid performance. While waiting for a break in Osbourne's career, Iommi decided to record a solo album and Hughes was brought in to provide the vocals. Due to the aforementioned contractual obligations with the record company, the album was credited to Black Sabbath featuring Tony Iommi and released in 1986 to generally positive critical reviews. While touring to promote the new album, Hughes was replaced by vocalist Ray Gillen after just six shows; this was due both to injury from a confrontation with Black Sabbath's production manager John Downing, which contributed to a degradation in his voice, and his not being in good enough physical shape to complete the tour.

Hughes's first bass guitar was a salmon pink, pre-CBS Fender Jazz Bass. During his tenure in Trapeze, he played a Fender Mustang and a Jazz Bass as well as a Rickenbacker 4001 on the Deep Purple albums Burn, Stormbringer, and Come Taste the Band. This Rickenbacker was eventually given to Black Sabbath bassist Geezer Butler, who subsequently used it on the Never Say Die! tour in 1978.

=== Health recovery and career rejuvenation (1991–2008) ===
At the end of the decade, Hughes realised that his ongoing drug problem was derailing not only his career, but killing his very being. So he committed himself to making a full recovery. In 1991, a clean, sober and fully rejuvenated Hughes returned with the vocal for the chart-topping hit "America: What Time Is Love?" with The KLF. He also recorded all the vocals for former Europe guitarist John Norum's solo album Face the Truth (1992). He then re-embarked on a solo career that has been his primary focus to date, with the 1992 release of Hughes Blues, recorded with a cast of various guitarists, and From Now On (1994) and Burning Japan Live (1994), both featuring former members of Swedish rockers Europe being his opening salvo.

In 1996, Tony Iommi enlisted Hughes for the album The 1996 DEP Sessions, though it remained unreleased until 2004.

In 1998, Hughes and keyboardist Geoff Downes of band Asia released an album named The Work Tapes.

In 1999, Hughes did a short tribute tour to Tommy Bolin in Texas, with Tommy's brother Johnnie (of Black Oak Arkansas) on drums. An album, A Tribute to Tommy Bolin by Glenn Hughes & Friends was issued.

In 2003, Hughes made a guest appearance in the metal opera project "AINA", alongside other guest vocalists including Michael Kiske, Tobias Sammet, Andre Matos and Simone Simons on the debut album Days of Rising Doom.

In 2005 Hughes released Soul Mover supporting it with a European tour. He also collaborated with Tony Iommi on the 2005 album Fused. There was also the Michael Men Project album Made in Moscow (Glenn Hughes & Joe Lynn Turner.

Hughes then released Music for the Divine in 2006, which featured Red Hot Chili Peppers members Chad Smith and John Frusciante. Hughes toured in support of the album throughout Europe in autumn 2006. In 2006 Hughes made a guest appearance on Quiet Riot's eleventh studio album Rehab, doing bass work and songwriting work with the band.

Live in Australia, an acoustic CD and companion DVD of a performance at Sydney's famous "Basement" club was released via Edel Records on 17 November 2007. The album First Underground Nuclear Kitchen was released on 9 May 2008 in Europe and on 12 May in the rest of the world.

2008 also saw the release of the Hughes and Robin George collaboration album Sweet Revenge.

- Glenn Hughes, Keith Emerson & Marc Bonilla Boys Club - Live in California (2009)

=== Autobiography and other projects (2009–2016) ===
In 2009, Hughes joined with keyboardist Keith Emerson of Emerson, Lake & Palmer and guitarist Marc Bonilla for the album Boys Club - Live from California. That year Hughes also formed Black Country Communion with Jason Bonham (drums), Joe Bonamassa (guitar) and Derek Sherinian (keyboards). The band released three albums through 2012 and disbanded in March 2013 following the departure of Bonamassa. Black Country Communion reunited in 2016 and released a fourth album in 2017.

In July 2010, Hughes appeared at the High Voltage Rock Festival in London, England, fronting Heaven & Hell as a guest vocalist (together with singer Jørn Lande) in a tribute to the late Ronnie James Dio.

Hughes' autobiography was published in May 2011 by British specialist limited edition publishers Foruli. The book, titled Deep Purple and Beyond: Scenes from the Life of a Rock Star, was co-written with author Joel McIver and featured contributions by Tony Iommi, David Coverdale, Ozzy Osbourne, and Tom Morello, as well as a foreword by Lars Ulrich of Metallica. An extended paperback edition, retitled Glenn Hughes: The Autobiography, was published in late 2011 by Jawbone Press.

On 13 September 2012, Hughes and Derek Sherinian met Bako Sahakyan, the president of the breakaway Nagorno-Karabakh Republic and organised a concert in Stepanakert.

In 2013, Hughes made a special guest appearance on the debut, self-titled album from Device. He is featured on the song "Through It All" accompanying David Draiman on vocals.

Hughes has been touring as a member of Kings of Chaos, performing lead vocals, backing vocals and acoustic guitars, since early 2013. In late 2013, he formed a new band called California Breed with drummer Jason Bonham and guitarist Andrew Watt. The group released one self-titled album in 2014. California Breed announced in 2015 that they had broken up.

During 2015, Hughes undertook a solo world tour, featuring guitarist Doug Aldrich and drummer Pontus Engborg. The next year, he released his most recent studio album, Resonate.

=== The Dead Daisies (2019–2026) ===
In September 2019, it was also announced that Hughes would be joining the rock The Dead Daisies as lead singer and bassist. The line-up at the time included guitarist Doug Aldrich, drummer Deen Castronovo and rhythm guitarist David Lowy. The band also debuted a new track, "Righteous Days", with Hughes singing.

In November and December, the band went to the south of France, where they spent four weeks recording the album Holy Ground with producer Ben Grosee at La Fabrique Studios in Saint-Rémy de Provence. Everything was completed by the start of 2020 though due to the COVID-19 pandemic not released until January 2021. Though Hughes' first with the band, it was the Dead Daisies' fifth album.

On September 30, 2022, the band released Radiance. Though he recorded its follow-up, Light 'em Up, by the time of its 2024 release Hughes had left the band. Though not longer a member, during 2023 he and his former bandmates collaborated as the Purple Daisies for a number of gigs.

Along the way, in 2023, Hughes and Robin George reunited to record the album Overcome

=== Retirement from the road (2026–present) ===
In August 2026, Hughes announced his immediate retirement from touring and live performances due to requiring a life-saving open-heart surgery.

== Discography ==
- Play Me Out (1977)
- L.A. Blues Authority Volume II: Glenn Hughes – Blues (1993)
- From Now On... (1994)
- Burning Japan Live (1994)
- Feel (1995)
- Addiction (1996)
- The Way It Is (1999)
- Return of Crystal Karma (2000)
- From the Archive Vol. 1 - Incense & Peaches (2000)
- A Soulful Christmas (2000)
- Building the Machine (2001)
- Songs in the Key of Rock (2003)
- Soulfully Live in the City of Angels (2004)
- Soul Mover (2005)
- Music for the Divine (2006)
- First Underground Nuclear Kitchen (2008)
- Live in Wolverhampton (2012)
- Resonate (2016)
- Chosen (2025)
