= Return of Crystal Karma =

Return Of Crystal Karma

Studio album by Glenn Hughes
- Released: 19 June 2000
- Recorded: January 2000
- Genres: Hard rock, funk
- Length: 50:55; 55:49 (Japanese version)
- Labels: SPV GmbH (Europe); Nippon Crown (Japan)
- Producers: Glenn Hughes; Michael Scott

Glenn Hughes chronology
The Way It Is (1999)	Return Of Crystal Karma (2000)	Building The Machine (2001)

Professional ratings
Review scores
Source	Rating
AllMusic	2/5 stars

Return of Crystal Karma (often abbreviated to R.O.C.K.) is the seventh studio album by former Deep Purple, Black Sabbath and Trapeze vocalist/bassist Glenn Hughes. The album was released 19 of June 2000 by SPV and Nippon Crown.

== History ==
Return of Crystal Karma is Hughes’ seventh solo studio album, his sixth since 1992. The album has a similar bass driven funk sound to 1999’s The Way It Is, although R.O.C.K. has a slightly more serious tone.

R.O.C.K. was performed by a set band throughout the album, unlike many of Hughes’ previous albums which had featured multiple musicians and guests. Regular guitarist JJ Marsh makes his third appearance on a Glenn Hughes album and co-wrote many of the tracks. The rest of the band is made up of keyboardist Hans Zermüehlen, Hughes’ regular drummer of the period Gary Ferguson and Lol Tolhurst (former member of The Cure) who contributed some electronica parts.

"Gone" was written by Hughes and Tony Iommi of Black Sabbath for their abandoned 1996 album project. At the point of R.O.C.K.’s release Hughes’ considered it unlikely that those sessions would be released due to their prolific bootlegging. However, Iommi decided to release the songs from the sessions (along with "Gone") in 2004 as The 1996 DEP Sessions.

The instrumental track Owed to J is named in reference to the instrumental Owed to G, which featured on the Deep Purple album Come Taste the Band. The "J" in Hughes' track is a reference to Jeff Beck, and the song is very much influenced by the guitarist. The "G" in the Deep Purple song stands for Gershwin.

Hughes decided to give himself the moniker ‘Funk Man’ in the writing credits for the songs. This is the only occasion where he has referred to himself as such.

The Japanese version of the album contained a bonus track entitled The World Is Broken. There is also a more common double CD version which includes ‘Live in South America’, which was recorded in São Paulo on November 25, 1999. The live disc includes two songs from The Way It Is, two from the Hughes/Thrall album, a Trapeze track and No Stranger to Love, which was taken from the 1986 Black Sabbath album Seventh Star.

A video was shot for the song Days of Avalon and was released on VHS on Hughes’ Pink Cloud Records label, it is no longer available.

== Track listing ==
1. "The State I'm In" – 4:58 (Hughes, Marsh)
2. "Midnight Meditated" – 4:27 (Hughes, Marsh)
3. "It's Alright" – 4:31 (Hughes, Marsh)
4. "Switch the Mojo" – 4:33 (Hughes, Marsh)
5. "Gone" – 5:51 (Hughes, Iommi)
6. "The Other Side of Me" – 3:50 (Hughes, Zermüehlen)
7. "Angela" – 5:57 (Hughes, Zermüehlen)
8. "Owed to J" – 5:58 (Ferguson, Hughes, Marsh, Zermuehlen)
9. "This Life" – 4:52 (Hughes, Zermüehlen)
10. "Days of Avalon" – 5:58 (Hughes, Marsh)

=== Japan bonus track ===
11. "The World Is Broken" – 4:54 (Hughes, Zermüehlen)

=== Live in South America (bonus CD) ===
1. "You Kill Me" – 4:38 (Hughes, Sales)
2. "Neverafter" – 6:46 (Hughes, Marsh)
3. "First Step of Love" – 6:12 (Hughes, Thrall)
4. "No Stranger to Love" – 8:06 (Hughes, Iommi)
5. "Coast to Coast" – 10:23 (Hughes)
6. "Your Love is Alright" – 9:40 (Galley, Holland, Hughes)

== Personnel ==
- Glenn Hughes – Vocals, Bass
- JJ Marsh – Guitars
- Gary Ferguson – Drums on R.O.C.K.
- Hans Zermuehlen – Keyboards
- Lol Tolhurst – Electronica on R.O.C.K.
- Bob Harsen – Drums on Live In South America
- Michael Scott – Engineered and Mixed
