= Resonate (album) =

Studio album by Glenn Hughes
- Released: 28 October 2016
- Recorded: June – July 2016 Medley Studio, Copenhagen, Denmark; and Command Studios, London, England
- Genre: Hard rock
- Label: Frontiers
- Producers: Glenn Hughes, Søren Andersen

Glenn Hughes chronology
| Live at Wolverhampton (2012) | Resonate (2016) | Chosen (2025) |

Singles from Resonate
- 1. "Heavy" Released: 20 September 2016; 2. "Long Time Gone" Released: 26 October 2016

Resonate is the fourteenth studio album by English hard rock singer Glenn Hughes. The album was released in Japan on 28 October 2016 by Ward Records, and worldwide on 4 November 2016 by Frontiers. Hughes has said of the album: "It's possibly the heaviest record I've ever made. I don't want to confuse it with horns-up heavy; it's not metal. But it's definitely f—ing heavy. It's dense. It's dark. There's some aggression on this record. Every bloody track is begging to be played live."

== Track listing ==
All tracks are written by Glenn Hughes, except track 12 which was written by Gary Moore.

| No. | Title | Length |
|---|---|---|
| 1. | "Heavy" | 3:22 |
| 2. | "My Town" | 4:07 |
| 3. | "Flow" | 4:37 |
| 4. | "Let It Shine" | 4:48 |
| 5. | "Steady" | 6:33 |
| 6. | "God of Money" | 5:05 |
| 7. | "How Long" | 5:59 |
| 8. | "When I Fall" | 3:56 |
| 9. | "Landmines" | 4:25 |
| 10. | "Stumble & Go" | 3:24 |
| 11. | "Long Time Gone" | 4:36 |

CD version (bonus track)
| No. | Title | Length |
|---|---|---|
| 12. | "Nothing's the Same" | 4:59 |

Japanese version (bonus tracks)
| No. | Title | Length |
|---|---|---|
| 13. | "When I Fall" (acoustic remix) | 3:57 |

== Personnel ==
- Glenn Hughes – vocals, bass guitar, acoustic guitar, producer, mixer
- Søren Andersen – guitars, producer, mixer, mastering
- Pontus Engborg – drums (tracks 2–10)
- Chad Smith – drums (tracks 1, 11)
- Lachy Doley – keyboards
- Luis Maldonado – acoustic guitar (track 12)
- Anna Maldonado – cello (track 12)
- Frederik Cupello – assistant engineer
- Johan Jørgensen – studio assistant

== Charts ==
| Chart (2016) | Peak position |
|---|---|
| Belgian Albums (Ultratop Flanders) | 183 |
| Belgian Albums (Ultratop Wallonia) | 147 |
| Dutch Albums (Album Top 100) | 186 |
| German Albums (Offizielle Top 100) | 78 |
| Scottish Albums (Official Charts) | 69 |
| Swiss Albums (Schweizer Hitparade) | 69 |
| UK Rock & Metal Albums (Official Charts) | 6 |
| US Independent Albums (Billboard) | 26 |
| US Top Hard Rock Albums (Billboard) | 15 |
| US Top Rock Albums (Billboard) | 40 |
