= Live! Go for What You Know =

Live! Go For What You Know

Live album by Pat Travers Band
- Released: 1979
- Recorded: January and February 1979
- Studio: At Great Southern Music Hall, Gainesville, Florida; Opry House, Austin, Texas; Olympia Theater/Gusman Center, Miami, FL
- Genre: Blues rock; hard rock
- Length: 42:12
- Label: Polydor (LP (1979) and CD (1993), #841904)
- Producer: Pat Travers, Tom Allom

Pat Travers chronology
The Pat Travers You Missed Mini-Album (EP) (1978)	Live! Go For What You Know (1979)	Crash and Burn (1980)

Live! Go For What You Know is a live album by the Pat Travers Band, released in 1979 on Polydor Records. It reached platinum status in the US, and was re-released on CD in 1993.

== Background ==
The album was recorded on tour in the US in early 1979, and featured the guitar tandem of Travers and Pat Thrall, who had joined the Pat Travers band in 1977 and had recorded Heat In The Street (1978) with them. According to Legends of Rock Guitar, on this album and the follow-up, Crash and Burn (1980), the duo of Travers and Thrall bridged the gap between what it calls "dramatic changes" in metal in the late 1970s: Travers emblematized "the blues-rock sound of sixties and seventies metal" whereas Thrall's playing represents the newer wave in metal (represented by Eddie van Halen): "The combining of the two players' solos during this time showed a rare detente between two generations of hard rockers and, although short-lived, it was extremely exciting."

The album was produced by Tom Allom, who had worked on the first five Black Sabbath albums as a sound engineer, had produced two albums by The Tourists, and would afterward produce nine albums by Judas Priest and the debut album On Through the Night by Def Leppard. Besides praising the guitar playing of Travers and Thrall, critics have also hailed Tommy Aldridge, a drumming pioneer who after leaving the Pat Travers Band played with Ozzy Osbourne; one critic called him "the definitive double bass drummer" on the basis of this album.

== Critical reception ==
Professional ratings
Review scores
Source	Rating
Allmusic	4.5/5 stars

The album garnered positive reviews. It came recommended by Billboard magazine, and received positive reviews in the Los Angeles Times and The Daily Collegian. Years after its release, the live album is often referred to by critics as the pinnacle of Pat Travers' career. Especially the "live classic" song "Boom Boom (Out Go the Lights)" (a Stan Lewis cover), which was released as a single, is frequently associated with him and continues to be an audience favorite. The song was included on a 2001 compilation CD called Goin' South. In July 2007, a forum of Guitar Player magazine readers voted Live! Go For What You Know in their top 40 of live albums.

== Track list ==
Side one

1. "Hooked on Music" (from Makin' Magic) (Pat Travers) – 6:26
2. "Gettin' Betta" (from Putting It Straight) (Mars Cowling, Travers) – 4:52
3. "Go All Night" (from Heat in the Street) (Travers) – 4:02
4. "Boom Boom (Out Go the Lights)" (from Pat Travers) (Stan Lewis) – 5:05

Side two

1. "Stevie" (from Makin' Magic) (Travers) – 6:21
2. "Makin' Magic" (from Makin' Magic) (Travers) – 4:00
3. "Heat in the Street" (from Heat in the Street) (Jeffrey Lesser, Travers) – 4:24
4. "Makes No Difference" (from Pat Travers) (Travers) – 7:03

== Personnel ==
- Pat Travers – guitar, vocals
- Peter "Mars" Cowling – bass
- Pat Thrall – guitar, backing vocals
- Tommy Aldridge – drums

== Production ==
- Recorded in Austin, Miami, and Gainesville
- Produced by Pat Travers and Tom Allom
- Design by Stephanie Zuras
