= Snortin' Whiskey =

Song written by Pat Travers and Pat Thrall

"Snortin' Whiskey" (also sometimes referred to as "Snortin' Whiskey, Drinkin' Cocaine") is a blues rock song written by Pat Travers and Pat Thrall. It was originally recorded by the Pat Travers Band and released on the album Crash and Burn in 1980 on the Polydor label and also as a US single the same year.

== Background ==
The song was an instant hit and reached the number one position on request lists at numerous FM radio stations in the United States in 1980. It gained popularity in the United Kingdom and Germany as well. It became one of Pat Travers' signature songs. The success of "Snortin' Whiskey" helped to propel the Crash and Burn album to the number 20 position on the Billboard's Pop Album Chart, making it Travers' highest-charting release.

== Personnel ==
Musicians who performed on the original studio recording of "Snortin' Whiskey" were:

- Pat Travers – lead vocals, lead and rhythm guitars (second guitar solo during lead break)
- Pat Thrall – lead and rhythm guitars (first guitar solo during lead break)
- Peter "Mars" Cowling – bass
- Tommy Aldridge – drums and percussion (including cowbell)

== Popular culture ==
- The song was featured in the 2004 film Sideways.
- The death metal band Obituary uses the song as their introduction music.
