= Hughes/Thrall =

UK musical group

- Origin: England/United States
- Genres: Hard rock
- Years active: 1982, 2006–2009
- Labels: Boulevard, Rock Candy
- Past members: Glenn Hughes; Pat Thrall
- Website: hughesthrall.com

Hughes/Thrall was a musical project formed in 1982 by former Deep Purple and Trapeze bassist/vocalist Glenn Hughes and guitarist Pat Thrall.

== History ==
While Pat Thrall had spent the late 1970s and early 1980s making a name for himself by playing with the likes of Automatic Man and Pat Travers, former Deep Purple member Glenn Hughes recorded one solo album after the demise of Purple in 1976 entitled Play Me Out, a record that focused more on his love of soul and funk rather than hard rock. Play Me Out had limited success and Hughes had slipped off the musical map, save for a few guest appearances here and there.

Hughes moved to Los Angeles to write with the intention of releasing new material. In 1981, Thrall's playing caught Hughes' eye and the two formed a musical partnership. After a period of jamming and writing they started recording with producer Andy Johns (who had previously worked with the likes of Led Zeppelin, Free and The Rolling Stones). They released their debut album, simply called Hughes/Thrall in August 1982.

Released on a short-lived subsidiary of Epic, called Boulevard Records, the album had little marketing behind it and although it received critical acclaim it failed to make a big impression with the music-buying public and saw disappointing sales. The music video for the song "The Look in Your Eye" received sporadic, brief play on the budding MTV cable channel. Hughes blamed some of the obscurity on the fact that both he and Thrall were suffering from drug addictions at the time, and couldn't support the album with a proper tour.

The album itself had a definite radio-friendly, album-oriented rock sound. However it also had elements of post-punk and new wave; many musicians and critics have cited the record as highly influential to the direction of rock music in the eighties. Over time it has become something of a cult record.

Hughes/Thrall took to the road for a short American tour, playing a handful of gigs in California and Texas supporting Santana. The touring band featured drummer Tommy Aldridge and keyboardist Jesse Harms.

== Further collaborations ==
The pair recorded some demos for a proposed follow-up to the first album, but these never ended up being released and the album was scrapped. A few of these demos have surfaced over the years, but are of limited quality.

One of the songs originally intended for the aborted follow-up to Hughes/Thrall, "Still the Night" later appeared on the 1985 Phenomena album, which featured Hughes’ vocals. This song also made an appearance on John Norum’s 1992 album Face the Truth, again featuring Hughes. Thrall would also record another version of the song, re-titled "Steal the Night", alongside former Strangeways frontman Tony Liddle and Billy Rush of Southside Johnny & The Asbury Jukes, though this never progressed beyond demo form.

Hughes and Thrall did team up again in 1987 to record a track for the Tom Hanks-Dan Aykroyd comedy Dragnet. The song, "City of Crime", featured Hanks and Aykroyd rapping the verses, while Hughes sang the chorus. It was released as a single and a promotional video was shot, which received heavy rotation on MTV.

Two songs, "You Were Always There" and "Devil in You", from the abandoned follow-up album were included on Hughes’ 1994 solo album From Now On...; although both were new recordings that did not feature Thrall’s playing.

Thrall did, however perform on Hughes’ 1995 album Feel, playing guitar and keyboards on eight of the tracks and co-writing two of them. To date this is the most recent collaboration between Hughes and Thrall.

== Hughes/Thrall follow-up ==
In 2006 it was announced that Hughes and Thrall were actively working on a follow-up to their 1982 album, and were in the process of writing and recording new material. In September, they started the final phase of the recording process, and announced that the album would be released in 2007.

The news of the new album coincided with the setting up of hughesthrall.com. The first Hughes/Thrall album was remastered and re-released in January 2007 on Rock Candy Records. This new version included two additional tracks.

In 2007, it was announced on their website that Hughes/Thrall 2 had been pushed back to 2008. They also stated that the album includes thirteen songs, of which eleven are new compositions, while two date back from the sessions of the scrapped initial follow-up.

In June 2009, Hughes stated "I have put the Hughes/Thrall 2 project behind me... We started the album in 1997 and Pat Thrall wanted to produce it by himself. Ten years to produce an album? I usually take no more than six months. Let's move on with our lives."

On 2 September 2016, Thrall joined Hughes on stage in Las Vegas to play two Hughes & Thrall numbers during Hughes' solo tour.

== Discography ==
=== Studio albums ===
- Hughes/Thrall (1982, Remaster 2007)

=== Other Glenn Hughes/ Pat Thrall collaborations ===
- "City of Crime" (1987) - Single taken from the soundtrack to the film Dragnet
- Feel - Glenn Hughes (1995)

=== Charting Singles ===
1983 "Beg, Borrow Or Steal" PEAK: #79 (US)

== Line-up ==
- Glenn Hughes - Vocals / bass
- Pat Thrall - Guitar / guitar synthesizer

=== Additional studio musicians ===
- Gary Ferguson – Drums
- Frankie Banali – Drums
- Gary Mallaber - Drums
- Peter Schless - Keyboards

=== Additional live musicians ===
- Tommy Aldridge - Drums
- Jesse Harms - Keyboards
