= Different Stages – The Best of Glenn Hughes =

Different Stages - The Best of Glenn Hughes

Greatest hits album by Glenn Hughes
- Released: 16 July 2002
- Genre: Hard rock Funk
- Length: 104:01
- Label: SPV
- Producer: Various

Professional ratings
Review scores
| Source | Rating |
|---|---|
| RevelationZ | 7/10 stars |
| Blogcritics | 7.5/10 stars |

Different Stages – The Best of Glenn Hughes is a compilation album by former Deep Purple, Black Sabbath and Trapeze vocalist/ bassist Glenn Hughes. The album was released in 2002 on SPV records.

== Overview ==
Different Stages is an overview of Glenn Hughes career during the nineties and the start of the 21st century. Hughes re-established his solo career in 1992 after kicking the drug habits that marred his career in the eighties.

The two CD compilation features twenty songs from Hughes’ solo career between 1994’s Burning Japan Live and 2001’s Building The Machine.

Although the album does not feature any songs from albums with his past bands, it does contain live solo versions of songs Hughes originally recorded with Deep Purple, Trapeze, Black Sabbath and Hughes/Thrall.

All the material on the album has been previously released.

== Track listing ==
1. "Burn (live)" (Blackmore, Coverdale, Hughes, Lord, Paice) (from Burning Japan Live) – 6:47
2. "You Kill Me" (Hughes, Sales) (from The Way It Is) – 3:32
3. "Highball Shooter" (Blackmore, Coverdale, Hughes, Lord, Paice) (from Building The Machine) – 4:28
4. "Muscle and Blood (live)" (Hughes, Thrall) (from Burning Japan Live) – 5:44
5. "Save Me Tonight (I'll Be Waiting)" (Hughes, Kentis, Rojas) (from Feel) – 4:16
6. "Addiction" (Bonilla, Hughes) (from Addiction) – 4:27
7. "You Keep on Moving (live)" (Coverdale, Hughes) (from Burning Japan Live) – 7:18
8. "Can't Stop the Flood" (Hughes, Marsh) (from Building The Machine) – 4:10
9. "No Stranger to Love (live)" (Hughes, Iommi) (from Live In South America) – 8:07
10. "From Now On (live)" (Hughes) (from Burning Japan Live) – 6:09
11. "Death of Me" (Bonilla) (from Addiction) – 3:47
12. "I Got Your Number (live)" (Hughes, Thrall) (from Burning Japan Live) – 4:19
13. "The State I'm In" (Hughes, Marsh) (from Return of Crystal Karma) – 4:58
14. "Your Love Is Alright (live)" (Galley, Holland, Hughes) (from Live In South America) – 9:18
15. "Gettin' Tighter (live)" (Bolin, Hughes) (from Burning Japan Live) – 4:02
16. "This Life" (Hughes, Zermuehlen) (from Return of Crystal Karma) – 4:53
17. "Freedom" (Hendrix) (from The Way It Is) – 4:18
18. "Lady Double Dealer (live)" (Blackmore, Coverdale) (from Burning Japan Live) – 3:28
19. "Redline" (Hughes, Thrall) (from Feel) – 4:50
20. "Stormbringer (live)" (Blackmore, Coverdale) (from Burning Japan Live) – 5:10

== Personnel ==
- Marc Bonilla – guitar, keyboards
- Vince DiCola – keyboards
- Gary Ferguson – drums
- Ian Haughland – drums
- Glenn Hughes – bass, vocals
- Todd Hunter – keyboards
- Thomas Larsson – guitar
- John Leven – bass
- J.J. Marsh – guitar
- Mic Michaeli – keyboards
- Stevie Salas – guitar
- Matt Sorum – drums
- Pat Thrall – guitar, keyboards
- Joe Travers – drums
- Han Zermuehlen – keyboards
