= Gnidrolog Live 1972 =

Live 1972

Live album by Gnidrolog
- Released: 1999
- Recorded: 10 July 1972; 8 July 1972 (bonus track)
- Genres: Progressive rock; jazz rock
- Length: 64:08
- Label: Audio Archives

Gnidrolog chronology
Lady Lake (1972)	Live 1972 (1999)	Gnosis (2000)

Live 1972 is the third album of the British progressive rock band, Gnidrolog. The album was recorded live in Birmingham on 10 July 1972 and released in 1999 as the band's only live album. The album's bonus track was recorded live in Aylesbury on 8 July 1972. The album introduced four Gnidrolog songs which have never been released, while re-releasing only three tracks, "I could never be a soldier", from the Lady Lake album, "Time and Space" and "In Spite of Harry's Toenail", from the In Spite of Harry's Toenail album. The album was released after the band reunited, following a 27-year breakup. This comeback saw the recording and release of one more album, Gnosis, released later in 2000.

== Track listing ==
No.	Title	Length
1.	"Intro / Any Use In Living"	9:16
2.	"I Could Never Be A Soldier"	12:34
3.	"Time And Space"	7:23
4.	"Meanwhile Back At The Office" (or "The Continuing Story of Peter")	4:23
5.	"My Mother"	9:37
6.	"In Spite Of Harry's Toenail" a. "Goodbye - Farewell - Adieu" b. "Harry's Toenail"	13:27

Bonus Track
No.	Title	Length
7.	"Sixpence For A Handstand"	8:28

== Personnel ==
- Colin Goldring - lead vocals, guitar, saxophone, recorder, tenor horn, harmonica
- Stewart Goldring - lead guitar, vocals
- Peter "Mars" Cowling - bass guitar, cello
- Nigel Pegrum - percussion, flute, oboe
- John Earle - alto, tenor, baritone and soprano saxophones, flute, vocals
