= Blackjack (American band) =

American rock band (1979–1980)

- Origin: United States
- Genres: Hard rock; glam metal
- Years active: 1979–1980
- Label: Polydor
- Past members: Michael Bolton; Bruce Kulick; Sandy Gennaro; Jimmy Haslip

Blackjack was an American rock band, active from 1979 to 1980, featuring Michael Bolton (who was performing under his real name, Michael Bolotin), Bruce Kulick, Sandy Gennaro and Jimmy Haslip. The band was short-lived, released two albums, the self-titled Blackjack in 1979 and Worlds Apart in 1980, and embarked on a small US nationwide tour.

== History ==
Blackjack was formed in late 1978 after Bruce Kulick had come off the road touring with Meat Loaf behind the Bat Out of Hell album. Kulick and his older brother Bob had done a show backing up Michael Bolton, then a solo artist with two albums, at a club show in Connecticut. Afterwards both Kulick brothers were invited to join Bolton in a proper band. While Bob declined, Bruce accepted. The band's manager Steve Weiss, also an attorney for Led Zeppelin, brought drummer Sandy Gennaro and bassist Jimmy Haslip into the fold to complete the line-up.

The band was quickly signed to Polydor Records and named Blackjack. At the behest of their record company and management, the foursome went to work with producer Tom Dowd at Criteria Studios in Miami, Florida to record their debut album. Blackjack was released in 1979 and peaked at No. 127 on the Billboard charts selling around 100,000 copies. The album's biggest single, "Love Me Tonight", reached No. 62 on Billboard. Blackjack shot videos for both "Without Your Love" and "Love Me Tonight", which were part of a nine-minute promotional movie circulated by the label, and toured with acts such as Peter Frampton and the Marshall Tucker Band.

In 1980, Bruce Kulick played guitar on Billy Squier's solo debut album, The Tale of the Tape, produced by Eddy Offord of Yes fame. Offord also became the producer for Blackjack's second album Worlds Apart. But, with the disappointing sales of their debut album and a regime change at Polydor, Blackjack were no longer a priority act at the label and Worlds Apart was released in 1980 with very little backing and no tour support from the record company. It spelled the end for Blackjack as individual members had opportunities and offers to join more promising musical situations.

=== Post-breakup ===
By 1981, Gennaro had replaced Tommy Aldridge in the Pat Travers Band, making his debut on the Radio Active album. Haslip would re-team with members of the Robben Ford Band under the name Yellowjackets who issued their self-titled debut album in 1981. After turning down a touring gig with Billy Squier in favor of staying with Blackjack, Kulick recorded Great American Music with The Good Rats in 1981 and also played guitar on Michael Bolton's eponymous 1983 debut album for Columbia Records before joining Kiss in 1984. He subsequently performed lead guitar on Bolton's 1985 follow-up album, Everybody's Crazy and on several tracks from his 1987 breakthrough album, The Hunger.

It was rumored that Bolton was considered as the lead vocalist for Black Sabbath in 1982–83 after the departure of Ronnie James Dio. Black Sabbath's bassist Geezer Butler later said this claim about Bolton was a joke by the band's guitarist Tony Iommi. Bolton himself said it was "only a rumor" which might have originated from Blackjack once opening a concert for Ozzy.

=== Album reissues ===
Blackjack and Worlds Apart were first issued on CD as a two-for-one package by PolyGram in 1990, with a Japanese release following in 1996. UK-based label Lemon Records would do another 2-for-1 reissue in 2006, titled Anthology, with extensive liner notes by English rock journalist Malcolm Dome. The most recent re-issues came in December 2013 when both albums were released individually by Universal Music Japan in the cardboard sleeve mini-LP format as SHM-CD remasters.

== Rap appeal ==
The Blackjack song "Stay" off their second album Worlds Apart was sampled by rapper Jay-Z for the song "A Dream" off his 2002 album The Blueprint 2: The Gift & the Curse which reached No. 1 on the Billboard charts.

In 2004, rapper Kanye West re-recorded a section of "Maybe It's the Power of Love" off Worlds Apart for inclusion on his song "Never Let Me Down"; it was released on his triple platinum selling debut album The College Dropout which peaked at No. 2 on the Billboard 200. Speaking to the website Genius in 2015, Bolton gave his approval of the sampling, stating that "the song turned out beautifully".

== Members ==
- Michael Bolton – lead vocals (1979–1980)
- Bruce Kulick – guitars (1979–1980)
- Jimmy Haslip – bass, backing vocals (1979–1980)
- Sandy Gennaro – drums, percussion (1979–1980)

== Discography ==
- Blackjack (1979)
- Worlds Apart (1980)
