= Lady Lake (album) =

Studio album by Gnidrolog
- Released: December 1972
- Recorded: Autumn 1972
- Studio: Morgan Studios, London
- Genre: Progressive rock; jazz rock
- Length: 38:31; 42:48 (2012 reissue)
- Label: RCA, Disques Rue Bis, Gnidrolog Records, BMG Japan, Esoteric Recordings
- Producer: Dick Parkinson

Gnidrolog chronology
...In Spite of Harry's Toenail (1972)	Lady Lake (1972)	Live 1972 (1999)

Professional ratings
Review scores
Source	Rating
Allmusic	2.5/5 stars

Lady Lake is the second studio album of the British progressive rock band, Gnidrolog. The album was recorded in the London Morgan Studios in 1972 and released that same year. The album was re-issued in the UK in 1999 and in Japan in 2009. The songs in the album deal with a variety of concepts varying from pacifism in "I Could Never Be a Soldier", to pilgrimage in "Ship", and Tchaikovsky's Swan Lake in the title track, "Lady Lake". The band broke up shortly after the album was released due to lack of commercial success, but would eventually release a third, live, album in 1999 - recorded in 1972.

== Track listing ==
All lead vocals by Colin Goldring, except "Social Embarrassment", sung by John "Irish" Earle.

Side one
No.	Title	Writer(s)	Length
1.	"I Could Never Be A Soldier"	Colin Goldring	11:36
2.	"Ship"	Colin Goldring	6:44
3.	"A Dog With No Collar"	Stewart Goldring	2:09

Side two
No.	Title	Writer(s)	Length
4.	"Lady Lake"	Peter "Mars" Cowling, Stewart Goldring	8:53
5.	"Same Dreams"	Colin Goldring	2:49
6.	"Social Embarrassment"	Peter "Mars" Cowling, Colin Goldring	6:30

Bonus track on 2012 Esoteric Recordings reissue
No.	Title	Notes	Length
7.	"Baby Move On" (previously unreleased)	Recorded at Morgan Studios in 1972, London	4:07
Total length:			42:48

== Personnel ==
- Colin Goldring - rhythm guitar, vocals, recorder, tenor horn
- Stewart Goldring - lead guitar
- Peter "Mars" Cowling - bass guitar, cello
- Nigel Pegrum - percussion, flute, oboe
- John Earle - soprano, tenor and baritone saxes, flute, lead vocal on "Social Embarrassment"
- Charlotte Fendrich - piano on "Same Dreams"
