= Different Stages =

Different Stages may refer to:

- Different Stages (Rush album), a 1998 album by Rush
- Different Stages – The Best of Glenn Hughes, a 2002 compilation album by Glenn Hughes
