= Gnidrolog =

British progressive rock band

- Origin: London, England
- Genres: Progressive rock; art rock; experimental rock; folk rock
- Years active: 1969–1973, 1999–2000
- Labels: Snails, RCA, Audio Archives
- Past members: Stewart Goldring; Colin Goldring; Nigel Pegrum; John Earle; Peter "Mars" Cowling; Rick Kemp; Nessa Glen

Gnidrolog was a British progressive rock band.

== History ==
The band was founded in 1969 by twin brothers Colin and Stewart Goldring, who were joined by drummer Nigel Pegrum from Spice and Peter "Mars" Cowling on bass. John Earle joined the band on saxophone and flute for their second album. They came up with the band name by reversing and slightly rearranging the brothers' surname, adding in an extra "o".

In May 1972, the British music magazine NME reported that Gnidrolog was to appear at the Great Western Express Lincoln Festival on 26 May that year, along with Budgie, Skin Alley, Tea & Symphony, John Martyn, and Warhorse. In 1972, Gnidrolog released both their first and second albums, In Spite of Harry's Toe-Nail and Lady Lake, upon the release of which personnel changes intervened with Stewart Goldring and Nigel Pegrum being replaced by guitarist John Knightsbridge (ex-Third World War) and drummer John Bedon (ex-Warm Dust). That line-up lasted into 1973 but disbanded due to continued lack of commercial success.

Despite having played gigs with acts such as David Bowie, Colosseum, King Crimson, Gentle Giant, Wishbone Ash, Soft Machine, and Magma in their brief career, they have always remained relatively obscure.

Cowling began a long working relationship with Pat Travers in 1975.

The Goldring brothers formed the punk rock band the Pork Dukes in 1976, and later went on to do session work, as did other members. Nigel Pegrum joined Steeleye Span and John "Irish" Earle went on to be a successful musician, playing with artists such as Thin Lizzy, Ian Dury and the Clash.

After a break of 27 years, they got back together in 1999, and released their third studio album, Gnosis, in 2000.

== Personnel ==
- Stewart Goldring – lead guitar, vocals
- Colin Goldring – lead vocals, rhythm guitar, recorder, tenor saxophone, horn, harmonica
- Nigel Pegrum – percussion, flute, oboe, piano
- John "Irish" Earle - soprano, tenor, baritone saxophones, flute, vocals (d. 2008)
- Peter "Mars" Cowling – bass guitar, cellos (d. 2018)
- Rick Kemp – bass guitar, backing vocals
- Nessa Glen – Hammond organ, bowed glass samples, kalimba, keyboards, harpsichord, keyboard sitar

== Discography ==
- ...In Spite of Harry's Toenail (1972)
- Lady Lake (1972)
- Live 1972 (1999)
- Gnosis (2000)
