= Heat in the Street =

Studio album by Pat Travers Band
- Released: 1978
- Recorded: 1978
- Studios: Quadradial Cinema Corp., North Miami, Florida
- Genre: Hard rock
- Length: 35:51
- Label: Polydor
- Producer: Jeffrey Lesser

Pat Travers chronology
Putting It Straight (1977)	Heat in the Street (1978)	Live! Go for What You Know (1979)

Professional ratings
Review scores
Source	Rating
AllMusic	3/5 stars

Heat in the Street is a rock album by the Pat Travers Band. It was released in 1978 on Polydor Records. It is the first with the most popular of Travers' band line-ups, with Travers and Pat Thrall on guitar, Peter "Mars" Cowling on bass guitar and Tommy Aldridge on drums. Heat in the Street was produced by Jeffrey Lesser.

== Track listing ==
Side one

1. "Heat in the Street" (Jeffrey Lesser, Travers) - 4:29
2. "Killer's Instinct" (Lesser, Travers) - 5:09
3. "I Tried to Believe" (Travers) - 5:05
4. "Hammerhead" [instrumental] (Cowling, Travers) - 3:04

Side two

1. "Go All Night" (Travers) - 3:58
2. "Evie" (Harry Vanda, George Young) - 4:14
3. "Prelude" [instrumental] (Travers) - 3:39
4. "One for Me and One for You" (Travers) - 6:12

== Personnel ==
- Tommy Aldridge – drums
- Peter "Mars" Cowling – bass guitar
- Pat Thrall – guitar, guitar synthesizer, backing vocals
- Pat Travers – guitar, keyboard, vocals

== Charts ==
Album - Billboard

Year	Chart	Position
1979	Pop Albums	99
