= Burning Japan Live =

Live album by Glenn Hughes
- Released: 31 August 1994 (Japan); 17 July 1995 (UK)
- Genre: Rock Hard rock AOR
- Length: 75:43
- Label: SPV (Europe) Shrapnel Records (US)
- Producer: Glenn Hughes

Professional ratings
Review scores
Source	Rating
Allmusic link	4/5 stars

Burning Japan Live is a live album by former Deep Purple, Black Sabbath and Trapeze vocalist and bassist Glenn Hughes. It was recorded at the Club Citta in Kawasaki, Japan on Tuesday 24 May and Wednesday 25 May 1994 in support of the studio album From Now On....

== History ==
This was the first official live solo album to be released by Hughes. It features a set-list of fifteen songs, four from his 1994 solo album From Now On..., three songs from the Hughes/Thrall album and seven Deep Purple numbers. It also features a never before heard song titled Still In Love With You, on which Hughes plays keyboards.

Hughes’ band for the concerts was the same as the band that played on From Now On..., including Europe members Mic Michaeli, John Levén and Ian Haugland (who only performed on the bonus tracks from From Now On...).

It is of note that a live version of the track Kiss Of Fire (from the first Phenomena album) was recorded during the same performance and included on the Talk About It EP.

There is an error in the sleeve notes for the album; they mistakenly credit the tracks This Time Around and Owed To G to Bolin/Hughes/Paice, when they should read Hughes/Lord and Bolin, respectively.

== Track listing ==
No.	Title	Writer(s)	Original Album	Length
1.	"Burn"	Ritchie Blackmore, David Coverdale, Jon Lord, Ian Paice	Deep Purple – Burn (1974)	6:44
2.	"The Liar"	Jean Beauvoir, Glenn Hughes	From Now On... (1994)	4:39
3.	"Muscle And Blood"	Hughes, Pat Thrall	Hughes/Thrall – Hughes/Thrall (1982)	5:48
4.	"Lay My Body Down"	Hughes, Thomas Larsson	From Now On... (1994)	5:08
5.	"From Now On..."	Hughes	From Now On... (1994)	6:08
6.	"Into The Void"	Jens Bojfeldt, Hughes, Mic Michaeli	From Now On... (1994)	7:13
7.	"Still In Love With You"	Hughes	From Now On... (1994)	2:10
8.	"Coast To Coast"	Hughes	Trapeze — You Are the Music... We're Just the Band (1972)	6:52
9.	"This Time Around"	Hughes, Lord	Deep Purple – Come Taste the Band (1975)	3:32
10.	"Owed To G"	Tommy Bolin	Deep Purple – Come Taste the Band (1975)	2:53
11.	"Gettin' Tighter"	Bolin, Hughes	Deep Purple – Come Taste the Band (1975)	3:59
12.	"You Keep On Moving"	Coverdale, Hughes	Deep Purple – Come Taste the Band (1975)	7:25
13.	"Lady Double Dealer"	Blackmore, Coverdale	Deep Purple – Burn (1974)	3:45
14.	"I Got Your Number"	Hughes, Thrall	Hughes/Thrall – Hughes/Thrall (1982)	4:17
15.	"Stormbringer"	Blackmore, Coverdale	Deep Purple – Stormbringer (1974)	5:10

== Personnel ==
- Glenn Hughes – vocals, keyboards on track 7
- Thomas Larsson – guitars, background vocals
- Eric Bojfeldt – guitars, background vocals
- John Levén – bass
- Ian Haugland – drums
- Mic Michaeli – keyboards, background vocals
