= Gnosis (disambiguation) =

Gnosis (Greek: γνῶσις) is the common Greek noun for knowledge.

Gnosis may also refer to:

- GNOSIS, a capability-based operating system
- Gnosis (artist) (fl. c. 300 BC), the artist's name signed upon the famous 'deer hunt mosaic'
- Gnosis (chaos magic), an altered state of consciousness in chaos magic
- Gnosis (Gnidrolog album), the fourth album of the British progressive rock band, Gnidrolog
- Gnosis (magazine), an American magazine published from 1985 to 1999
- Gnosis (Monuments album), the debut studio album by British progressive metal band Monuments
- Gnosis (Russian Circles album), the eighth album by post-metal band Russian Circles
- Gnosis, a 2008 science fiction thriller novel by Adam Fawer
- Gnosis, antagonists in the role-playing video game series Xenosaga
- Gnosis, an item to represent an Archon's status in the video game Genshin Impact
- Unverified personal gnosis, spiritual belief not corroborated by historical texts or tradition
- Gnosis (neurology) is the capacity of the brain to perceive stimuli.
