= Radio Active (Pat Travers album) =

Studio album by Pat Travers Band
- Released: 1981
- Recorded: October 1980 – February 1981
- Genre: Hard rock
- Label: Polydor
- Producers: Dennis Mackay, Pat Travers

Pat Travers chronology
Crash and Burn (1980)	Radio Active (1981)	Black Pearl (1982)

Professional ratings
Review scores
Source	Rating
AllMusic	3/5 stars

Radio Active is an album released by Pat Travers on Polydor Records in 1981. Radio Active was Pat Travers' first release after the highly successful Crash and Burn. However, Pat Thrall and Tommy Aldridge had already left the band. Travers and Cowling forged on with former Blackjack drummer Sandy Gennaro, but the album barely made it into the Top 40. Disappointed with the lack of sales, Polygram dropped Travers from its roster. Travers successfully sued Polydor for breach of contract which he won, allowing him to record two future albums on the label.

Radio Active was recorded at Bee Jay Recording Studios in Orlando, Florida, from October 1980 to February 1981. Neither the vinyl LP or subsequent CD re-issues list which personnel appear on what tracks.

== Track listing ==
All tracks composed by Pat Travers except where indicated

1. "New Age Music" (Roger Lewis, Ian Lewis, Jacob Miller, Bernard Harvey) – 5:05
2. "My Life is on the Line" – 3:43
3. "(I Just Wanna) Live it My Way" – 5:32
4. "I Don't Wanna Be Awake" – 3:54
5. "I Can Love You" – 2:24
6. "Untitled" – 3:25
7. "Feelin' In Love" – 3:30
8. "Play It Like You See It" – 5:12
9. "Electric Detective" – 3:07

== Personnel ==
- Pat Travers - guitar, keyboard, vocals
- Peter "Mars" Cowling - bass guitar
- Sandy Gennaro - drums
- Michael Shrieve - percussion

Additional Personnel

- Pat Thrall - guitar
- Tommy Aldridge - drums

== Charts ==
Album - Billboard

Year	Chart	Position
1981	Pop Albums	37
