= Crash and Burn (Pat Travers Band album) =

Crash And Burn

Studio album by Pat Travers Band
- Released: April 1980
- Recorded: June 1979 – January 1980
- Studios: Quadradial Recording Studio, Miami, Florida
- Genres: Blues rock; hard rock
- Length: 38:54
- Label: Polydor
- Producers: Dennis Mackay, Pat Travers

Pat Travers chronology
Live! Go for What You Know (1979)	Crash And Burn (1980)	Radio Active (1981)

Professional ratings
Review scores
Source	Rating
AllMusic	3/5 stars

Crash And Burn is a music album released by the Pat Travers Band on Polydor Records in 1980.

Crash And Burn was the Pat Travers Band's highest-charting release, peaking at number 20 on the Billboard album chart. The album featured the single "Snortin' Whiskey", co-written by Travers and fellow band member guitarist Pat Thrall. This song became a significant hit on American FM radio in 1980, reaching the number one position on playlists all over the country. The album's title track was also issued as a single, but wasn't as successful as "Snortin' Whiskey". The song "Crash And Burn" was a departure from Pat Travers' usual guitar-oriented material, and was basically a keyboard song driven by the band's rhythm section of Peter "Mars" Cowling on bass, and drummer Tommy Aldridge.

Other standout tracks include a cover of "Born Under A Bad Sign", originally recorded by Albert King, and "(Your Love) Can't Be Right", which was also released as a single. The Bob Marley song "Is This Love?" was also included, and featured Dawn Shahan on backing vocals. The album was indeed a great commercial success, but many fans and critics alike cite several of the musician's other releases to be better overall projects. The album propelled the Pat Travers Band into headlining status in the United States but was the last recorded work to feature the popular line-up of Aldridge, Cowling, and Thrall. It earned gold record status initially, and later with the advent of compact discs, was reissued and achieved platinum record status.

The album was recorded at Quadradial Studios in Miami, Florida from June 1979 to January 1980 during breaks from touring. Final mixes were done at Bayshore Studios in Coconut Grove, Florida, in February 1980, and the album was released in April 1980.

== Critical reception ==
Upon its release, Crash and Burn received negative reviews from contemporary music critics. Reviewing the album for New Musical Express in June 1980, Kevin Fitzgerald heavily criticized the record and the broader hard rock and heavy metal genres of the era, describing the musical style as "brain fungus" that lacked edge. Fitzgerald panned the band's stylistic choices, particularly their cover of Bob Marley's "Is This Love", which he felt was stripped of its original qualities and turned into a flat, generic pop song. He also dismissed the instrumental track "The Big Event", comparing it to music played in "the waiting room in purgatory," and criticized the album's production for its focus on macho guitar bravado and technical equipment specifications.

== Track listing ==
All tracks composed by Pat Travers; except where indicated

1. "Crash And Burn" – 5:21
2. "Your Love Can't Be Right" – 3:34
3. "Snortin' Whiskey" (Pat Thrall, Travers) – 3:29
4. "Born Under a Bad Sign" (William Bell, Booker T. Jones) – 5:51
5. "Is This Love?" (Bob Marley) – 5:30
6. "The Big Event" – 5:37
7. "Love Will Make You Strong" – 4:06
8. "Material Eyes" (Alex Kash, Thrall) – 5:53

== Personnel ==
- Pat Travers - guitars, lead vocals, keyboards
- Pat Thrall - guitars, backing vocals
- Peter "Mars" Cowling - bass
- Tommy Aldridge - drums, percussion

Additional Personnel

- Dawn Shahan - backing vocals
- Michael Shrieve - percussion
- Greg Calbi, David Gotlieb, Dennis Mackay & Eric Schilling - engineering

== Charts ==
Chart (1980)	Peak position
Canada Top Albums/CDs (RPM)	51
US Billboard Top LPs	20
