= Sandy Gennaro =

American rock drummer (born 1951)

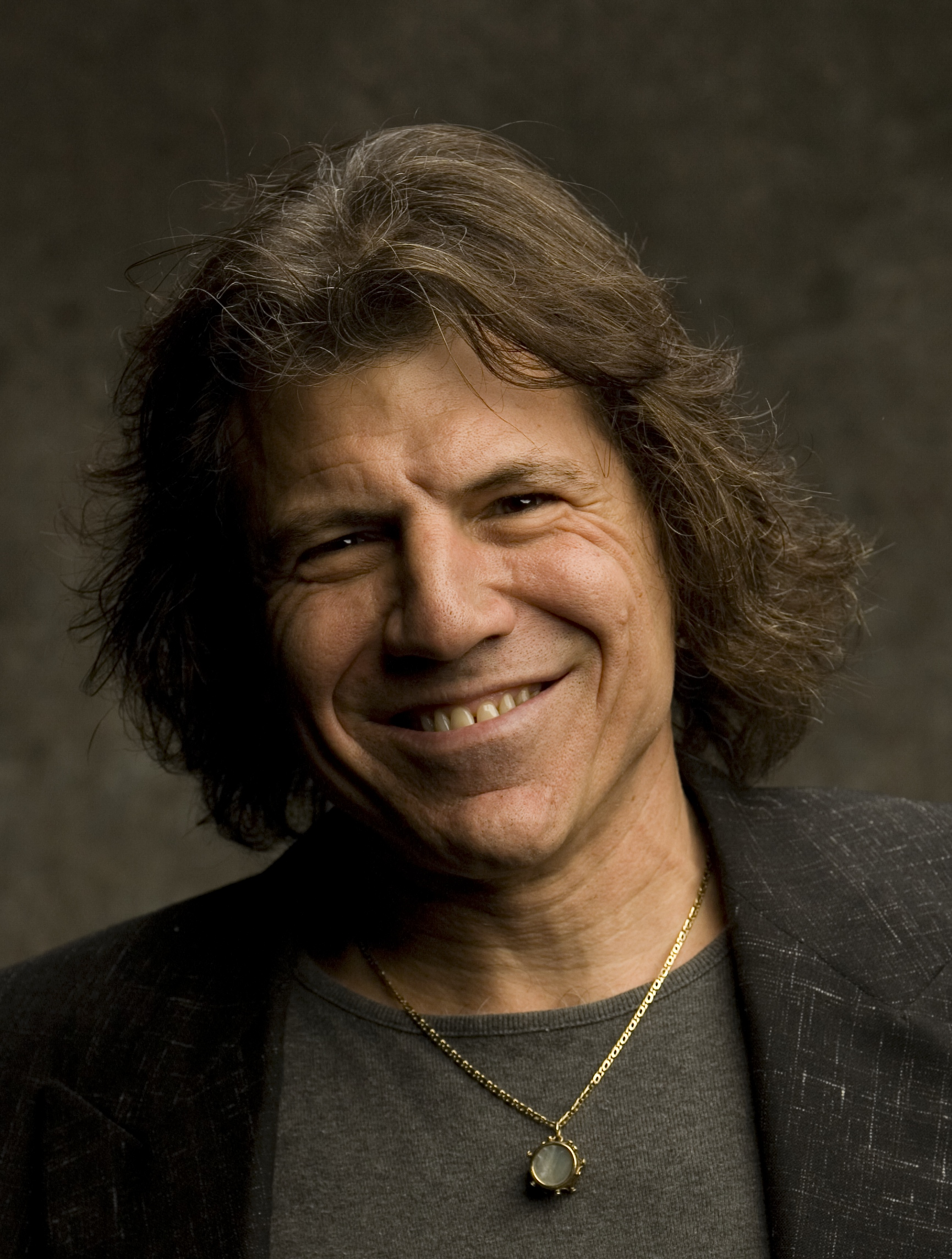

Background information
- Born: Santo Michael Gennaro; July 3, 1951 (age 75); Manhattan, New York, U.S.
- Occupations: Drummer; author; musician; public speaker; mentor
- Instrument: Drums
- Years active: 1970s–present
- Formerly of: Blackjack

Santo Michael "Sandy" Gennaro (born July 3, 1951) is an American rock drummer, author, musician, public speaker and mentor. He has recorded and toured with many musical artists including Blackjack, the Monkees, Pat Travers, Cyndi Lauper, Joan Jett, and Robin Gibb.

== Early years ==
Born "Santo Gennaro" in Little Italy, (Manhattan's Lower East Side), Gennaro grew up on Staten Island, New York. At the age of 3 he showed interest in a toy drum and later at age 13 he played a friend's snare drum, which prompted him to buy his first drum set. At age 14 he joined his first band "The Black and Blues". Gennaro took private lessons and by 16 he was touring the New York/New Jersey/Pennsylvania circuit, playing high school dances, parties and minor musical events. At 18, Gennaro toured the Midwest playing night clubs and bars in a Cover band. In 1976, Gennaro moved to California and joined rock quartet Blackjack, featuring Michael Bolton, guitarist Bruce Kulick and bassist Jimmy Haslip. Blackjack recorded two albums and toured with Peter Frampton which eventually led Gennaro to record his first hit single with the New York-based singer Benny Mardones, "Into the Night" and LP Never Run, Never Hide. This was the beginning of Gennaro's association with the Pat Travers Band and afterwards his connection with singer/songwriter Cyndi Lauper, whose debut album She's So Unusual became a multi-platinum hit. Lauper hired Gennaro for the Fun Tour as well as other national and international tours and he appears on the concert video for the singer's single "Money Changes Everything". From here Gennaro went on to record and tour with Bo Diddley, Joan Jett and Johnny Winter.

== Recording career ==
Gennaro's recording career includes Blackjack, Pat Travers, Cyndi Lauper, Robin Gibb, Craaft, Joan Jett, Junkyard Angels, and the Monkees.

== Professional expansion ==
Gennaro toured with Craaft, a metal band from Germany throughout Europe/UK as the opening band for Queen during mid-1986. He participated on every The Monkees reunion tour from 1987 until the death of Davy Jones in 2012. Genarro was also the featured drummer on the second and third Annual Dick Wagner Memorial Concert in 2016 and 2017 respectively. 'Remember The Child" at The Fillmore Detroit commemorating the late guitarist/singer/songwriter Dick Wagner. Wagner's music which was performed by many artists including Wagner's son Robert Wagner, Jean Beauvoir, Grammy Award-winning pianist and singer from the Waterboys Paul Brown, guitarist Micki Free, Derek St. Holmes, Joe Bass, Hal Patino, Maryann Cotton, Jimmie "Bones" Trombly, guitarist Kenny Olson, Peter Keys, David Winans II, Muruga Booker, Dennis Dunaway, The Frost, Laurie Beebe Lewis Johnny "Bee" Badanjek and other supporting musicians. The third annual "Remember the Child Concert" held in Detroit, Michigan at the MotorCity Casino Hotel in The Sound Board performance venue also featured Suzi Quatro Mark Farner, Kip Winger and many returning artists from the previous year. Proceeds benefited Children's Miracle Network Hospitals supporting music therapy.

Gennaro has served as a counselor and teacher at David Fishof's Rock 'n Roll Fantasy Camp since 2007 and continues to mentor musicians through this program. Gennaro taught at The Collective in New York City for 27 years where he created the Music Business program, teaching private lessons and master classes before moving to Nashville.

Gennaro has been a Keynote Speaker and Mentor with Vistage Worldwide since 2015. On July 21, 2023, Gennaro will be inducted into the RockGodz Hall of Fame in Nashville, TN alongside Mike Curb, Vanilla Fudge, Pat Travers, Steve Popovich, Bob Bender, Todd Sharp, and Tom Zutaut.

== Author ==
Gennaro wrote several articles for Modern Drummer magazine. He is also the creator of "Drum Basics" and "Contemporary Rock Styles for the Drums." His writing is featured in the October 2016 issue of Drumhead Magazine (owned by Jonathan Mover) issue #057, page 70 "The Top 10 Straight 8th and 16th note Grooves Every Drummer Should know....And Why" Sandy Gennaro's book "Beat The Odds" was co written with Steve Olivas and released in May of 2022. The 219 page book addresses business management, the music industry and Sandy's personal life experience as a drummer and public speaker.

== Discography ==
- 1979 Blackjack – Blackjack, Polydor PD-1-6215
- 1980 Blackjack - Worlds Apart, Polydor PD-1-6279
- 1980 Benny Mardones - Never Run, Never Hide, Polydor PD 2391 449
- 1981 Pat Travers – Radio Active, Polydor PD 2391 499
- 1982 Pat Travers – Black Pearl, Polydor PD 2391 553
- 1984 Cyndi Lauper – "Money Changes Everything" (single) Epic/Portrait 3P-582
- 1985 Cyndi Lauper – The Goonies (soundtrack)
- 1985 Robin Gibb – Walls Have Eyes, Polydor 827 592-1
- 1986 Craaft – Craaft Epic 26880
- 1990 Joan Jett – The Hit List, CBS Associated Records ZK 45473
- 1994 Junkyard Angels – Out of the Junkyard Onto the Curb, Midnight Fantasy Records 9839-2
- 2001 Micky Dolenz, Davy Jones, Peter Tork – 2001: Live in Las Vegas, Not On Label 772801
- 2002 The Monkees – Live Summer Tour (DVD), WIN Media – DVD-UK003d
- 2013 Pat Travers Band – Can Do, Back On Black Rock Classics RCV123LP

== Compilation albums ==
- 1991 Pat Travers – The Best of Pat Travers, Polydor 849 374-2
- 2014 Cyndi Lauper – She's So Unusual (A 30th Anniversary Celebration), Portrait 88883706352
- 2015 Pat Travers – Feelin' Right - The Polydor Albums 1975-1984, Polydor 5352821

== Personal life ==
On May 12, 1990, Gennaro married Shari Lynn Athey in North Carolina. Gennaro currently lives in Nashville, Tennessee, where he continues to teach, write, record, perform and travel for music and speaking engagements.
