= ...In Spite of Harry's Toenail =

Studio album by Gnidrolog
- Released: April 1972
- Studio: De Lane Lea Studios, London
- Genre: Progressive rock
- Length: 39:38
- Label: RCA, Audio Archives, Esoteric Recordings
- Producer: John Schroeder

Gnidrolog chronology
...In Spite of Harry's Toenail (1972)	Lady Lake (1972)

Professional ratings
Review scores
Source	Rating
AllMusic	3/5 stars

...In Spite of Harry's Toenail is the debut studio album by British progressive rock band, Gnidrolog. The album was recorded in the London De Lane Lea Studios and released in 1972. A re-issue was released in 1999 and 2012, including previously unreleased material, recorded by the band in 1969 and 1971.

== Track listing ==
All tracks are written by Gnidrolog.

Side one
No.	Title	Length
1.	"Long Live Man Dead" a. "Long Live Man Dead" (3:58) b. "Skull" (5:45)	9:43
2.	"Peter"	3:26
3.	"Snails"	7:14

Side two
No.	Title	Length
1.	"Time and Space"	7:30
2.	"Who Spoke"	2:22
3.	"In Spite of Harry's Toenail" a. "Goodbye - Farewell - Adieu" (3:40) b. "Harry's Toenail" (5:43)	9:23
Total length:		39:38

Bonus tracks on 1999 Audio Archives reissue
No.	Title	Notes	Length
9.	"Smokescreen"	recorded at IBC Studios, London, 1969	6:34
10.	"Saga of Smith and Smythe"	recorded at IBC Studios, London, 1969	8:29
11.	"My Room"	recorded at Maida Vale Studios, London, 1971	6:32
12.	"Saga of Smith and Smythe"	recorded at Maida Vale Studios, London, 1971	7:20
Total length:			68:43

Bonus track on 2012 Esoteric Recordings reissue
No.	Title	Notes	Length
7.	"Snails" (instrumental first version, previously unreleased)	recorded 29 November 1971 at De Lane Lea Studios, London	6:41
Total length:			46:19

== Personnel ==
- Colin Goldring - lead vocals, guitars, recorder, tenor sax, horn, harmonica
- Stewart Goldring - lead guitar, vocals
- Peter "Mars" Cowling - bass guitar, cello
- Nigel Pegrum - percussion, flute, oboe, piano
