= Makin' Magic =

Studio album by Pat Travers
- Released: 1977
- Recorded: 1977
- Genre: Blues rock; hard rock
- Length: 39:36
- Label: Polydor
- Producer: Emil Zoghby, Pat Travers

Pat Travers chronology
Pat Travers (1976)	Makin' Magic (1977)	Putting It Straight (1977)

Makin' Magic is the second album by Canadian rock musician Pat Travers. It was released in 1977 on Polydor Records.

Billboard listed it as one of their top album picks, praising it for having "some of the most energetic hard rock guitar music heard in a while".

== Track listing ==
All tracks composed by Pat Travers, except where indicated.

Side one

1. "Makin' Magic" – 5:05
2. "Rock 'N' Roll Susie – 3:39
3. "You Don't Love Me" – 3:27
4. "Stevie" – 7:13

Side two

1. "Statesboro Blues" (Wille McTell) – 3:41
2. "Need Love" – 5:03
3. "Hooked on Music" – 6:25
4. "What You Mean to Me" – 4:33

== Personnel ==
- Pat Travers – guitar, vocals
- Peter "Mars" Cowling – bass guitar, 8 string bass
- Nicko McBrain – drums, percussion
- Glenn Hughes – additional vocals ("Stevie")
- Brian Robertson – additional guitar ("Statesboro Blues")
