= From Now On... =

Studio album by Glenn Hughes
- Released: 29 January 1994 (Sweden); 7 March 1994 (International)
- Recorded: July–September 1993; November 1993 (bonus tracks)
- Genre: Hard rock
- Length: 57:18
- Labels: Empire Records (Europe); Explorer Records (US)
- Producers: Bruce Gowdy & Glenn Hughes

Glenn Hughes chronology
L.A. Blues Authority Volume II: Glenn Hughes - Blues (1992)	From Now On... (1994)	Feel (1995)

Singles from From Now On...
- 1. "Pickin' Up the Pieces" Released: February 1994 (Sweden); 2. "Why Don't You Stay" Released: April 1994 (NL)

Professional ratings
Review scores
Source	Rating
Allmusic	4/5 stars

From Now On... is the third solo studio album by former Deep Purple, Black Sabbath and Trapeze bassist/vocalist Glenn Hughes. The album was released on 29 January 1994 and had a distinctive AOR sound.

== History ==
From Now On... was Hughes’ second solo release after finding his ‘higher power’ and kicking the drug habits that had marred his career throughout the late 70s and 80s.

The album was recorded in Sweden in the Nordic Studio Lab and had its initial release just within that country. It was subsequently released in Japan, Europe and America.

It is notable that From Now On… is the only Glenn Hughes studio album which features no bass playing from Hughes himself (a situation that apparently made him uncomfortable in Black Sabbath), claiming that he wanted a ‘knees up without the bass’.

Hughes was supported by a band of Swedish musicians including Europe members John Levén, Mic Michaeli and Ian Haugland as well as guitarists Thomas Larsson and Eric Bojfeldt. Swedish singer/songwriter Meja also contributed backing vocals to the track "If You Don't Want Me To". The album also featured the songs "You Were Always There" and "Devil in You" which were originally written for the abandoned follow up to the Hughes/Thrall album.

The US release included a new version of the Deep Purple song "Burn", while the Japanese release featured both Burn and a new version of another Deep Purple track, "You Keep On Moving" originally featured on Come Taste the Band. Both these tracks were recorded in Sondtrade Studios in Solna by Ronny Lahti.

A live album entitled Burning Japan Live was taken from the From Now On... tour.

== Track listing ==
1. "Pickin' Up the Pieces" – 4:16 (Glenn Hughes, Bruce Gowdy)
2. "Lay My Body Down" – 4:42 (Hughes, Thomas Larsson)
3. "The Only One" – 4:38 (Hughes, Eric Bojfeldt)
4. "Why Don't You Stay" – 4:24 (Hughes, Richard Baker)
5. "Walkin' On The Water" – 4:33 (Hughes, Gowdy)
6. "The Liar" – 4:33 (Hughes, Jean Beauvoir)
7. "Into the Void" – 6:23 (Hughes, Bojfeldt, Mic Michaeli)
8. "You Were Always There" – 4:47 (Hughes, Pat Thrall)
9. "If You Don't Want Me To (Allyson's Song)" – 5:14 (Hughes, Jens Johansson, Per Stadin)
10. "Devil in You" – 4:00 (Hughes, Thrall)
11. "Homeland" – 4:42 (Hughes, Mel Galley)
12. "From Now On..." – 5:06 (Hughes)

=== US, EU and Japanese Bonus Track ===
13. "Burn" – 6:13 (Ritchie Blackmore, David Coverdale, Hughes, Jon Lord, Ian Paice)

=== Japanese Bonus Track ===
14. "You Keep On Moving" – 6:21 (Coverdale, Hughes)

== Personnel ==
- Glenn Hughes – vocals
- Thomas Larsson – guitar
- Eric Bojfeldt – guitar
- John Levén – Bass
- Hempo Hildén – drums tracks 1–12
- Ian Haugland – drums track 13–14
- Mic Michaeli – Keyboards, background vocals
- Meja – background vocals on track 9

== Charts ==
Year	Chart	Position
1994	Sweden	11
