= L.A. Blues Authority Volume II: Glenn Hughes – Blues =

Studio album by Glenn Hughes
- Released: 23 February 1993
- Genres: Blues rock; hard rock
- Length: 64:01
- Label: Shrapnel
- Producers: Steve Fontano; Glenn Hughes

Glenn Hughes chronology
Play Me Out (1977)	L.A. Blues Authority Volume II: Glenn Hughes – Blues (1993)	From Now On... (1994)

Professional ratings
Review scores
Source	Rating
AllMusic	3/5 stars

L.A. Blues Authority Volume II: Glenn Hughes – Blues is the second solo album by former Deep Purple, Black Sabbath and Trapeze vocalist/bassist Glenn Hughes.

The album was produced under the moniker of the L.A. Blues Authority, a blues rock project that featured many musicians playing original blues tracks and covers. This is the only album under that name which featured only original material performed by one singer. The album was recorded in three weeks and Hughes' claims the themes in the record deal with his personal demons of the time. This was Hughes' first solo album to be released after he kicked his drug habits in 1991 and found his 'higher power'. He hadn't released an album under his own name since 1977's Play Me Out. This marked a beginning of a highly productive period in Hughes' life that still continues.

Guest guitarists include Europe player John Norum (who had produced the album Face the Truth which featured Hughes on a number of tracks earlier in 1992), Mick Mars of Mötley Crüe, Warren DeMartini of Ratt, Richie Kotzen of Poison and Mr. Big and Mark Kendall of Great White fame.

== Track listing ==
1. "The Boy Can Sing the Blues" – 5:38 (Hughes, Erickson, Mike Varney)
2. "I'm the Man" – 5:45 (Hughes, Erickson)
3. "Here Come the Rebel" – 4:16 (Hughes, Erickson)
4. "What Can I Do for Ya?" – 6:16 (Hughes, Erickson)
5. "You Don't Have to Save Me Anymore" – 5:34 (Hughes, Erickson)
6. "So Much Love to Give" – 5:23 (Hughes, Erickson)
7. "Shake the Ground" – 6:05 (Hughes, Erickson)
8. "Hey Buddy (You Got Me Wrong)" – 6:12 (Hughes, Erickson, Franklin, Varney)
9. "Have You Read the Book?" – 4:42 (Hughes, Erickson)
10. "Life of Misery" – 5:15 (Hughes)
11. "Can't Take Away My Pride" – 4:23 (Hughes, Erickson)
12. "A Right to Live" – 4:32 (Hughes, Kotzen)

== Personnel ==
- Glenn Hughes – vocals, bass on tracks 1, 3, 10, 11 and 12
- Craig Erickson – all rhythm guitars, lead guitar on tracks 6 and 10
- Tony Franklin – bass on tracks 2, 4, 5, 6, 7, 8 and 9
- Gary Ferguson – drums
- Mark T. Jordan – keyboards
- John Norum – guitar Solos on tracks 1 and 2
- Warren DeMartini – guitar solo on tracks 1, 2 and 5
- Mark Kendall – lead guitar on track 3, guitar solo on track 5
- Richie Kotzen – lead guitar on tracks 4 and 12
- Darren Housholder – lead guitar on track 7, guitar solo on track 9
- Paul Pesco – guitar solo on track 8
- Mick Mars – guitar solo on track 9, slide guitar on track 11

== Charts ==
Year	Chart	Position
1993	Sweden	47
