= David Pastorius =

American bassist

- Born: Minneapolis, Minnesota, U.S.
- Genres: Rock, jazz fusion, funk, funk rock
- Occupation: Bassist
- Website: davidpastorius.com

David Pastorius is an American bass guitarist born in Minneapolis, Minnesota, residing in Melbourne, Florida. He is the nephew of late jazz virtuoso bass guitarist Jaco Pastorius.

Pastorius has played in numerous bands in the Florida region, has toured across the United States with various artists such as Tech N9ne and Pat Travers, appeared in a number of bass guitar-related magazines and has released and appeared on several studio albums.

He spent summer 2019 playing with Carl Palmer's ELP Legacy on the Royal Affair Tour with Yes, Asia and John Lodge of The Moody Blues.

== History ==
Pastorius started playing bass guitar at the age of 15 after being inspired by his high school friend, who had played the Red Hot Chili Peppers cover version of the Stevie Wonder song "Higher Ground" for him. At the age of 17, Pastorius joined his first band FHM (The Fleshy Headed Mutants) and began to play with local musicians performing heavy metal originals and cover songs.

He performed on the album Jaco Pastorius Big Band Word of Mouth Revisited, a tribute to Jaco Pastorius, released on August 23, 2003, by the Ohio record label Heads Up International. The album had performances by Pastorius with the popular bass guitarists Victor Bailey, Richard Bona, Jeff Carswell, Jimmy Haslip, Christian McBride, Marcus Miller, Gerald Veasley and Victor Wooten.

He formed the band, David Pastorius and Local 518, and released its first album, David Pastorius and Local 518, in spring 2007 on the Japanese record label P-Vine Records. In 2009, the band released a follow up album entitled Sense of Urgency.

In 2009, Pastorius joined the Southern punk/funk band Elephant Gun with Trevor Prince on guitar and vocals, and Tom Van Dyke on drums. The members were from the local Florida bands Local 518, Goliath and Big Orange Nitty Gritty. Elephant Gun hosted Wednesday night open mic events at Hustler Bar and Pool Room in the town of Indialantic, Florida. On December 17, 2011, while playing a set at Off The Traxx Sports Bar in Melbourne, Florida, with Elephant Gun, Pastorius had a heart attack. He went to the hospital after the show and had two stents placed in his arteries. On January 21, 2012, Baroos Beachside Bar in the town of Indialantic held a benefit concert to assist him and his family with his health issues. Six bands played at the event.

On July 31, 2011, Pastorius performed live with the drummer Keith LeBlanc and the guitarist Eric Gales for the concert event Eric Gales + Voodoo Chile - A Tribute To Jimi Hendrix at the B.B. King Blues Club & Grill in New York City.

In 2013 and throughout 2014, Pastorius started to record and film a series of video "bass remixes" of songs by one of his musical idols, the American rapper Tech N9ne, and posted them on YouTube. Pastorius' renditions caught the attention of Tech N9ne and his record label Strange Music, who requested him to perform a version of the Tech N9ne classic song "This Ring". Shortly afterward, in autumn 2014, Pastorius joined Tech N9ne's "Band Of Psychos" for a brief tour including 13 shows on the west coast of the U.S.

In 2014, he was asked to contribute to the documentary film, JACO: A Documentary Film, produced and co-written by Metallicas bass guitarist Robert Trujillo. Pastorius, with the musicians Rodrigo y Gabriela, Chino Moreno, and Tech N9ne, are seen in a song during the credits at the film's end. To assist in raising funds to complete the film, a campaign was started on the crowd-funding website Pledge Music. Pastorius offered 60-minute one-on-one video Skype lessons to help raise funds. On October 6, 2014, he made an appearance at the Sweetwater Music Hall in Mill Valley, California, for a work-in-progress screening of the film and a special live performance with a variety of music artists.

== Influences ==
Pastorius is a fan of many genres but listens to a lot of hip hop, 1980s' and heavy metal. His influences include the bass guitar players Sam Griffith, Robert Trujillo (of Metallica), Flea (of Red Hot Chili Peppers), Steve Harris (of Iron Maiden), Les Claypool (of Primus) and Mark King (of Level 42). His musical hero is Mike Patton of Mr. Bungle and Faith No More.

== Instruments ==
Pastorius plays Marleaux bass guitars, a Classic Series Max-tone bass guitar made by Artisan Bass Works and Hartke amplifiers.

== Discography ==
Late 1990s - The Nature Kids

=== with David Pastorius and Local 518 ===
2007 - David Pastorius and Local 518 (P-Vine Records)
2009 - Sense of Urgency

=== Compilation albums ===
2003 - Jaco Pastorius Big Band Word of Mouth Revisited (Heads Up International)
