= Putting It Straight =

Studio album by Pat Travers
- Released: 1977
- Recorded: 1977
- Studios: Eastern Sound, Toronto, Canada
- Genres: Blues rock; hard rock
- Length: 36:59
- Label: Polydor
- Producers: Dennis MacKay; Pat Travers

Pat Travers chronology
Makin' Magic (1977)	Putting It Straight (1977)	Heat In The Street (1978)

Professional ratings
Review scores
Source	Rating
AllMusic	3/5 stars
Record Mirror	4/5 stars

Putting It Straight is the third rock album by Pat Travers, released in 1977 on Polydor Records.

"Gettin' Betta" was often played in Travers' late 1970s sets and "Dedication" remains a stand out song on the album.

== Original LP track listing ==
All tracks composed by Pat Travers; except where indicated

Side one

1. "Life in London" - 4:22
2. "It Ain't What It Seems" - 4:13
3. "Speakeasy" - 3:18
4. "Runnin' from the Future" - 3:47
5. "Lovin' You" - 4:03

Side two

1. "Off Beat Ride" [instrumental] - 4:36
2. "Gettin' Betta" (Peter Cowling, Travers) - 4:45
3. "Dedication Parts 1 & 2" - 7:55

== Incorrect CD track sequence ==
1. "Life in London"
2. "Gettin' Betta"
3. "Runnin' from the Future"
4. "It Ain't What It Seems"
5. "Off Beat Ride"
6. "Lovin' You"
7. "Dedication"
8. "Speakeasy"

== Personnel ==
- Peter "Mars" Cowling - bass
- Nicko McBrain - drums
- Pat Travers - guitar, keyboard, vocals

Additional personnel

- Tony Carey - mini Moog ("Off Beat Ride")
- Scott Gorham - additional guitar ("Speakeasy")
- Bert Hermiston - saxophone ("Off Beat Ride" and "Dedication")
- Susie McKinley - background vocals ("Lovin' You")

== Charts ==
Chart (1978)	Peak position
Canada Top Albums/CDs (RPM)	56
US Top LPs & Tape (Billboard)	70
