= Blues on Fire =

Studio album by Pat Travers
- Released: July 31, 2012
- Genres: Hard rock; blues rock; heavy metal
- Length: 48:12
- Labels: Purple Pyramid, Cleopatra

Pat Travers chronology
Boom Boom at The House of Blues (2012)	Blues on Fire (2012)	Live at The Bamboo Room (2013)

Blues on Fire is the follow-up album by Pat Travers to Live at The Bamboo Room (2013). The album was released on Cleopatra Records in July 2012 and consisted of covers of blues songs from the 1920s.

== Track listing ==
No.	Title	Length
1.	"Black Dog Blues" (originally by Blind Blake)	3:39
2.	"Nobody's Fault But Mine" (originally by Blind Willie Johnson)	3:18
3.	"Back Water Blues" (originally by Lonnie Johnson)	5:06
4.	"Meat Shakin' Woman" (originally by Blind Boy Fuller)	3:49
5.	"Easy Rider Blues" (originally by Blind Lemon Jefferson)	3:08
6.	"Nobody knows You When You're Down and Out" (originally by Bessie Smith)	3:07
7.	"Bulldozer Blues" (originally by Henry Thomas)	4:40
8.	"You Can't Get That Stuff No More" (originally by Tampa Red)	4:39
9.	"Dark Night Blues" (originally by Blind Willie McTell)	4:24
10.	"Rock Island Blues" (originally by Furry Lewis)	3:13
11.	"Jailhouse Blues" (originally by C.W. Stoneking)	4:17
12.	"Death Letter" (originally by Son House)	4:52

== Personnel ==
- Pat Travers – guitars, bass guitar, vocals
- Doug Bare – organ, piano
- Carl Cleaver – piano
- Sean Shannon – drums, engineer

=== Technical/production ===
- John Lappen - A&R, Artist Relations
- Mark Prator - Mastering, Mixing
- Lucie Tran - Graphic Design
- John Wesley - Mastering, Mixing
