= Worlds Apart (Blackjack album) =

Studio album by Blackjack
- Released: 1980
- Recorded: 1980; Criteria Studios, Miami
- Genre: Hard rock
- Length: 37:37
- Label: Polydor
- Producer: Eddy Offord

Blackjack chronology
Blackjack (1979)	Worlds Apart (1980)

Professional ratings
Review scores
Source	Rating
AllMusic	2/5 stars

Worlds Apart is the second and final album of the American rock band Blackjack. The album was met with nearly total indifference, sold poorly and Blackjack disbanded shortly after its release.

The album contains the song "Welcome to the World", which opens with a live audio recording clip of a baby birth. A YouTube user by the name of Chris Cassone, engineer for Blackjack's band manager Phil Lorito, wrote on YouTube that the audio clip was of the birth of his son. Cassone made the recording (March 29, 1980) of his first wife, Dale Weigel Cassone, in White Plains Hospital during the delivery. Phil Lorito and members of Blackjack frequented nearby North Lake Sound Studios where Chris was chief engineer. Chris played the newly recorded tape at a recording session visited by Blackjack and they loved it. Casey Cassone, the boy born on the recording, received album liner credit from the band. The nurse coincidentally announces after he was born, "Open your eyes. Welcome to the world."

Jay-Z sampled the song "Stay" for his song "A Dream" from his 2002 album The Blueprint 2: The Gift & the Curse which reached No. 1 on the Billboard 200.

In 2004, Kanye West re-recorded a section of "Maybe It's the Power of Love" for inclusion on his song "Never Let Me Down"; it was released on his triple platinum selling debut album The College Dropout which peaked at No. 2 on the Billboard 200. Speaking to the website Genius in 2015, Bolton gave his approval of the sampling, stating that "the song turned out beautifully."

== Track listing ==
Side one
No.	Title	Writer(s)	Length
1.	"My World Is Empty Without You"	Holland-Dozier-Holland	3:08
2.	"Love Is Hard to Find"	Michael Bolton, Bruce Kulick	3:13
3.	"Stay"	Michael Bolton, Bruce Kulick	4:33
4.	"Airwaves"	Michael Bolton, Bruce Kulick	3:43
5.	"Maybe It's the Power of Love"	Michael Bolton	3:46

Side two
No.	Title	Writer(s)	Length
1.	"Welcome to the World"	Michael Bolton	4:43
2.	"Breakaway"	Michael Bolton, Bruce Kulick	4:13
3.	"Really Wanna Know"	Michael Bolton, Bruce Kulick	3:47
4.	"Sooner or Later"	Michael Bolton	3:35
5.	"She Wants You Back"	Michael Bolton, Bruce Kulick	2:51

== Personnel ==
Blackjack

- Michael Bolton - lead & backing vocals
- Bruce Kulick - lead & rhythm guitars
- Jimmy Haslip - bass, backing vocals
- Sandy Gennaro - drums, percussion

Additional personnel

- Jan Mullaney - keyboards
- Chuck Kirkpatrick - backing vocals
- Tonny Battaglia - backing vocals
- Eric Troyer - backing vocals
- Eddy Offord - production & engineering
- Rob Davis - engineering
