= Fun Tour =

1983–84 concert tour by Cyndi Lauper

- Tour by Cyndi Lauper
- Promotional poster for performances at The Ritz.
- Location: Europe; North America
- Associated album: She's So Unusual
- Start date: November 22, 1983
- End date: December 9, 1984
- Legs: 3
- No. of shows: 101

Cyndi Lauper concert chronology
- Fun Tour (1983–1984); True Colors World Tour (1986–1987)

The Fun Tour was a concert tour by American recording artist Cyndi Lauper in support of her debut album She's So Unusual. It was her first major headlining tour, with over 90 dates in various cities across North America. The tour kicked off in Poughkeepsie, New York, on November 22, 1983, and ended in St. Paul, Minnesota, on December 9, 1984. Lauper also performed shows in Paris, London and Switzerland.

== Background ==
The performance at the Summit in Houston in October 1984 was filmed for a planned home video release in 1985 which fell through; however, the promotional video for "Money Changes Everything" was taken from this footage. The show was also broadcast locally over the radio that evening. The show at The Palace in Hollywood in February 1984 was filmed and, along with performances by Madness and Ultravox, aired as a show called Rock of the 80s on Showtime. The New Year's Eve 1983 performance at the Ritz aired on MTV that evening as a New Year's Eve special.

Lauper was presented with a Canadian platinum award for her album She's So Unusual following her show on April 27, 1984 in Toronto. Billboard magazine described the award as a "world first".

== Reception ==
Paul Grein reviewed the Bouvard Auditorium show on September 28, 1984 for Billboard magazine. He noted the show was "remarkably tough and aggressive" and that Lauper seemed "resistant" to being "typecast as America's new pop princess", though still clearly had a "wide appeal". He named the album's title track and its first three singles as the highlights of the show. He noted that the version of "Girls Just Want to Have Fun" performed as similar to the remix version produced by Arthur Baker. He felt that Lauper should "probably [...] drop" the "Betty Boop voice" to avoid becoming a novelty act, and also felt there was "too much mugging and posing in Lauper's act". Grein also did not like that the keyboardist was given a lead vocal spot in the middle of the show.

== Set list ==
This set list was taken from the November 29, 1983 concert in Philadelphia, United States. It does not represent all shows throughout the tour.

1. "She Bop"
2. "When You Were Mine"
3. "I'll Kiss You"
4. "Money Changes Everything"
5. "Time After Time"
6. "Right Track Wrong Train"
7. "He's So Unusual"
8. "Yeah Yeah"
9. "Witness"
10. "I'm Gonna Be Strong"
11. "Girls Just Want to Have Fun"
12. "What a Thrill"
13. "Maybe He'll Know"

== Tour dates ==
List of 1983 concerts
Date	City	Country	Venue
November 22, 1983	Poughkeepsie	United States	Chance Theater
November 23, 1983	Sea Bright	United States	Tradewinds Beach Club
November 26, 1983	Paterson	United States	Hurrahs
November 29, 1983	Philadelphia	United States	Ripley's Music Hall
December 1, 1983	Boston	United States	The Metro
December 2, 1983	New Haven	United States	Toad's Place
December 3, 1983	Providence	United States	The Living Room
December 7, 1983	Washington, D.C.	United States	9:30 Club
December 9, 1983	Pompton Lakes	United States	The Meadowbrook
December 10, 1983	Syracuse	United States	Jabberwocky Nightclub
December 11, 1983	Buffalo	United States	The Continental
December 12, 1983	Rochester	United States	Club Casablanca
December 14, 1983	Cleveland	United States	Agora Ballroom
December 15, 1983	Pittsburgh	United States	The Decade
December 17, 1983	New York City	United States	The Ritz
December 31, 1983	New York City	United States	The Ritz

List of 1984 concerts
Date	City	Country	Venue
February 24, 1984	Union Township	United States	Wilkins Theatre
February 25, 1984	Stony Brook	United States	Stony Brook Recital Hall
February 27, 1984	Los Angeles	United States	Beverly Theater
February 29, 1984	Los Angeles	United States	Palace Theater
March 5, 1984	Honolulu	United States	CBS Convention Center
April 7, 1984	Framingham	United States	Performing Arts Center
April 8, 1984	New Haven	United States	Toad's Place
April 11, 1984	Philadelphia	United States	Temple University Campus Grounds
April 12, 1984	Boston	United States	The Metro
April 13, 1984	Hartford	United States	Agora Ballroom West
April 14, 1984	New York City	United States	Hilton Grand Ballroom
April 15, 1984	Bridgeport	United States	UB Student Center
April 18, 1984	Birmingham Township	United States	Brandywine Club
April 19, 1984	New York City	United States	The Ritz
April 20, 1984	New York City	United States	The Ritz
April 21, 1984	New York City	United States	The Ritz
April 24, 1984	Chicago	United States	Park West
April 25, 1984	Cleveland	United States	Agora Ballroom
April 26, 1984	Detroit	United States	Detroit Opera House
April 27, 1984	Toronto	Canada	The Concert Hall
April 29, 1984	Amherst	United States	Cornell Theatre
May 2, 1984	Boston	United States	The Metro
May 3, 1984	College Park	United States	Ritchie Coliseum
May 4, 1984	Atlanta	United States	Six Flags over Georgia Theatre
May 5, 1984	Atlanta	United States	Club Rumors
May 6, 1984	Tampa	United States	London Victory Club
May 7, 1984	Hallandale Beach	United States	Buttons South
May 9, 1984	New Orleans	United States	President
May 12, 1984	Montreux	Switzerland	Montreux Casino
May 14, 1984	Paris	France	Eldorado Club
May 24, 1984	London	England	Lyceum Theatre
August 29, 1984	Hartford	United States	Agora Ballroom West
August 30, 1984	Middletown	United States	OCCC Student Center
September 1, 1984	Wantagh	United States	Jones Beach Marine Theater
September 2, 1984	Boston	United States	Boston Common
September 5, 1984	New York City	United States	Chelsea Piers
September 6, 1984	Philadelphia	United States	Mann Center for the Performing Arts
September 7, 1984	Columbia	United States	Merriweather Post Pavilion
September 9, 1984	Holmdel Township	United States	Garden State Arts Center
September 13, 1984	Cuyahoga Falls	United States	Blossom Music Center
September 15, 1984	Mason	United States	Timberwolf Amphitheatre
September 16, 1984	Hoffman Estates	United States	Poplar Creek Music Theater
September 22, 1984	Irvine	United States	Irvine Meadows Amphitheatre
September 23, 1984	Santa Barbara	United States	Campus Events Center
September 24, 1984	San Francisco	United States	Palace of Fine Arts Theatre
September 26, 1984	Berkeley	United States	Berkeley Community Theatre
September 27, 1984	Bakersfield	United States	Kern County Fair Grandstand
September 28, 1984	Los Angeles	United States	Bovard Auditorium
September 30, 1984	Tempe	United States	Gammage Memorial Auditorium
October 2, 1984	Las Cruces	United States	Pan American Center
October 3, 1984	Albuquerque	United States	Albuquerque Civic Auditorium
October 5, 1984	Boulder	United States	CU Events Center
October 7, 1984	Tulsa	United States	Mohawk Park
October 10, 1984	Houston	United States	The Summit
October 12, 1984	Dallas	United States	Reunion Arena
October 13, 1984	Austin	United States	Frank Erwin Center
October 20, 1984	Gainesville	United States	O'Connell Center
October 21, 1984	Tallahassee	United States	TLCCC Theater
October 23, 1984	Fort Pierce	United States	Sunrise Theater
October 26, 1984	St. Petersburg	United States	Bayfront Center
October 27, 1984	Melbourne	United States	Florida Institute of Technology
October 30, 1984	New Orleans	United States	UNO Lakefront Arena
October 31, 1984	Birmingham	United States	Boutwell Auditorium
November 2, 1984	Durham	United States	Cameron Indoor Stadium
November 4, 1984	University Park	United States	Rec Hall
November 5, 1984	Fairmont	United States	Feaster Center
November 8, 1984	Millersville	United States	Pucillo Gymnasium
November 9, 1984	Troy	United States	Houston Field House
November 10, 1984	Binghamton	United States	SUNY-Binghamton West Gym
November 12, 1984	Toronto	Canada	Maple Leaf Gardens
November 14, 1984	Quebec City	Canada	Colisée de Québec
November 16, 1984	Montreal	Canada	Montreal Forum
November 17, 1984	Ottawa	Canada	Ottawa Civic Centre
November 21, 1984	Bethlehem	United States	Stabler Arena
November 23, 1984	Charlotte	United States	Charlotte Coliseum
November 24, 1984	Atlanta	United States	Fox Theater
November 25, 1984	Chattanooga	United States	UTC Arena
November 27, 1984	Nashville	United States	Memorial Gymnasium
November 28, 1984	Memphis	United States	Ellis Auditorium
December 1, 1984	Hampton	United States	Hampton Coliseum
December 2, 1984	Roanoke	United States	Roanoke Civic Center
December 4, 1984	Pittsburgh	United States	Civic Arena
December 5, 1984	Louisville	United States	Louisville Gardens
December 7, 1984	Kansas City	United States	Kemper Arena
December 9, 1984	Saint Paul	United States	Roy Wilkins Auditorium

=== Box office score data ===
Venue	City	Date	Tickets sold / available	Gross revenue
Chelsea Piers	New York City	September 5, 1984	8,000 / 8,000 (100%)	$80,000
Berkeley Community Theatre	Berkeley	September 26, 1984	3,441 / 3,441 (100%)	$46,791
O'Connell Center	Gainesville	October 20, 1984	7,910 / 8,144 (97%)	$95,862
Bayfront Center	St. Petersburg	October 26, 1984	6,414 / 8,450 (76%)	$79,787
RPI Field House	Troy	November 9, 1984	6,976 / 9,100 (77%)	$76,052
Maple Leaf Gardens	Toronto	November 12, 1984	13,500 / 13,500 (100%)	$166,353
Civic Arena	Pittsburgh	December 4, 1984	7,857 / 8,400 (93%)	$108,161
Louisville Gardens	Louisville	December 5, 1984	4,265 / 6,850 (62%)	$52,300
Kemper Arena	Kansas City	December 7, 1984	6,505 / 10,000 (65%)	$81,243
Roy Wilkins Auditorium	Saint Paul	December 9, 1984	5,475 / 5,475 (100%)	$66,852
TOTAL			58,902 / 69,919 (84%)	$726,610

== Band ==
- Kenni Hairston – keyboard and vocals
- Sandy Gennaro – drums
- John K. – bass
- John McCurry – guitar and vocals
