= Blackjack (Blackjack album) =

Studio album by Blackjack
- Released: June 18, 1979
- Recorded: 1979; Criteria Studios, Miami
- Genre: Hard rock
- Length: 37:33
- Label: Polydor
- Producer: Tom Dowd

Blackjack chronology
Blackjack (1979)	Worlds Apart (1980)

Singles from Blackjack
- 1. ""Love Me Tonight"/"Heart of Mine"" Released: 1979; 2. ""Without Your Love"/"Heart of Mine"" Released: 1979

Professional ratings
Review scores
Source	Rating
Allmusic	4.5/5 stars

Blackjack is the debut album of the American rock band Blackjack. The album was recorded shortly after the band's formation in early 1979 at Criteria Studios in Miami and released on Polydor Records on June 18, 1979.

Official music videos were recorded for the album's two singles, "Love Me Tonight" and "Without Your Love" and the album was promoted moderately by Polydor. The album was met with indifferent reception and the band would disband in 1980 after recording a second studio album, Worlds Apart.

The album was art directed by Abie Sussman and the cover artwork was designed and drawn by Gerard Huerta.

The album reached #127 on the Billboard album charts in 1979, and the lead single, "Love Me Tonight", reached #62 on the Hot 100 that same year.

== Track listing ==
Side one
No.	Title	Writer(s)	Length
1.	"Love Me Tonight"	Michael Bolton, Bruce Kulick, Robert Kulick	2:59
2.	"Heart of Stone"	Michael Bolton, Bruce Kulick	3:54
3.	"The Night Has Me Calling for You"	Michael Bolton, Bruce Kulick, Robert Kulick	4:35
4.	"Southern Ballad (If This Means Losing You)"	Michael Bolton, Bruce Kulick	3:45
5.	"Fallin'"	Michael Bolton, Bruce Kulick	3:33
Total length:			18:46

Side two
No.	Title	Writer(s)	Length
1.	"Without Your Love"	Michael Bolton	3:46
2.	"Countin' on You"	Michael Bolton, Bruce Kulick	3:38
3.	"I'm Aware of Your Love"	Michael Bolton, Bruce Kulick	3:38
4.	"For You"	Michael Bolton	4:44
5.	"Heart of Mine"	Michael Bolton, Bruce Kulick	2:56
Total length:			18:42

== CD re-issues ==
- 1990 Blackjack / Worlds Apart (PolyGram, 843 335-2)
- 1996 Blackjack / Worlds Apart (Polydor K.K. Japan, POCP-2416)
- 2006 Anthology [Blackjack / Worlds Apart] (Lemon, CD LEM84)
- 2013 Blackjack (Universal Music Japan, UICY-75998)

== Personnel ==
Blackjack

- Michael Bolton - lead & backing vocals
- Bruce Kulick - lead & rhythm guitars
- Jimmy Haslip - bass, backing vocals
- Sandy Gennaro - drums, percussion

Additional personnel

- Jan Mullaney - keyboards
- Chuck Kirkpatrick - backing vocals
- Tonny Battaglia - backing vocals
- Eric Troyer - backing vocals
- Tom Dowd - production
- Steve Gursky - engineering
- Mike Fuller - mastering
