= Retro Rocket =

Studio album by Pat Travers
- Released: March 17, 2015
- Genre: hard rock, blues rock, heavy metal
- Length: 51:35
- Label: Purple Pyramid, Cleopatra
- Producer: Pat Travers, Jürgen Engler

Pat Travers chronology
Can Do (2013)	Retro Rocket (2015)	The Balls Album (2016)

For spacecraft, see Retrorocket

Retro Rocket is the follow-up studio album by Pat Travers to Can Do (2013). The album was released on Cleopatra Records in March 2015.

== Track listing ==
No.	Title	Length
1.	"I Always Run"	5:29
2.	"Searching for a Clue"	5:15
3.	"Who Can You Turn To"	3:58
4.	"Up is Down"	5:18
5.	"Mystery at the Wrecking Yard"	6:27
6.	"You Can't Get Their From Hare"	4:20
7.	"I Am Alive"	3:31
8.	"I Wanna Be Free"	4:11
9.	"Hellbound Train"	4:43
10.	"Looking Up" (Live)	6:18
11.	"Lead Me Home" (Theme from The Walking Dead)	2:05
