= Pat Travers (album) =

Studio album by Pat Travers
- Released: April 1976
- Recorded: 1976
- Studio: at Chappell Recording Studios, London
- Genre: Blues rock; hard rock
- Length: 34:38
- Label: Polydor
- Producer: Emil Zoghby, Pat Travers

Pat Travers chronology
Pat Travers (1976)	Makin' Magic (1977)

Professional ratings
Review scores
Source	Rating
Allmusic	3/5 stars

Pat Travers is the debut album by Canadian rock musician Pat Travers. It was released in 1976 on Polydor Records.

== Track listing ==
All tracks composed by Pat Travers, except where indicated.

Side One

1. "Stop and Smile" - 3:51
2. "Feelin' Right" - 3:55
3. "Magnolia" (J. J. Cale) - 4:28
4. "Makes No Difference" - 4:30

Side Two

1. "Boom Boom (Out Goes the Lights)" (Stan Lewis) - 2:48
2. "Mabellene" (Chuck Berry, Russ Fratto, Alan Freed) - 2:56
3. "Hot Rod Lincoln" (Charlie Ryan, W. S. Stevenson) - 2:51
4. "As My Life Flies" (Pat Travers, S. Travers) - 2:34
5. "Medley Parts 1 & 2" - 6:45

== Personnel ==
- Peter "Mars" Cowling - bass
- Roy Dyke - drums
- Pat Travers - guitar, keyboard, vocals
