= Hughes/Thrall (album) =

Studio album by Hughes/Thrall
- Released: 23 August 1982
- Genre: Hard rock
- Length: 36:43
- Label: Boulevard Records
- Producer: Andy Johns; Glenn Hughes; Pat Thrall; Rob Fraboni

Professional ratings
Review scores
Source	Rating
Allmusic	link

Hughes/Thrall is the self-titled, debut album by musical collaborators Glenn Hughes (Deep Purple, Trapeze, Black Country Communion, Tony Iommi) and Pat Thrall (Pat Travers, Asia, Meat Loaf). It was released in 1982 on Boulevard Records and is, to date, their only album. The single "Beg, Borrow Or Steal" peaked at #79 in the US in early 1983.

== Collaboration ==
After the break-up of Deep Purple, Glenn Hughes had not been prolific in his output. By 1981 he had only produced one solo album; 1977's Play Me Out, an album focused on Hughes’ love for soul and funk. By comparison, guitarist Pat Thrall had worked on several albums with Automatic Man and Pat Travers. Thrall had come to the attention of Hughes while he was trying to write new material in Los Angeles. The two got together and quickly struck up a working partnership. The result was the Hughes/Thrall album.

Hughes/Thrall marked a return to hard rock for Hughes. The album itself has a definite AOR sound, but with influences of new wave and post-punk. Thrall made good use of guitar synthesizers and many have cited the album as being quite influential to the direction of rock music in the 1980s. It was critically well received upon its release. However, despite the positive reception from critics, the album failed to sell well at the time. It has since, however, become somewhat of a cult album.

== Featured artists ==
Along with Hughes and Thrall the album also featured keyboardist Peter Schless and drummers Gary Ferguson (who went on to work on many of Hughes’ albums in the 1990s and 2000s), Frankie Banali of W.A.S.P. and Quiet Riot fame, and prolific session player Gary Mallaber.

The album was co-produced and mixed by Andy Johns, who had previously worked with Led Zeppelin, Free and The Rolling Stones.

The song Coast to Coast had originally featured on the Trapeze album You Are the Music...We're Just the Band; the version on the Hughes/Thrall album is similar in arrangement to the original.

Promotional videos were shot for the songs The Look in Your Eyes and I Got Your Number and these received some airplay on music channels at their time of release.

== Re-issue ==
In January 2007 the album was re-issued by Rock Candy Records. This new version featured the original album, fully remastered, as well as two bonus tracks, both outtakes from the original sessions. The first bonus track, Still The Night, originally featured on the first Phenomena album, which featured Hughes, but not Thrall. Another version appeared on the John Norum album Face the Truth, again featuring Hughes. This is the first time the original version has been released.

== Follow-up album ==
An immediate follow-up to the Hughes/Thrall album was planned and some tracks were written and demoed; however, the project did not go any further and that album was scrapped. Two of the songs originally intended for the follow-up album, "You Were Always There" and "Devil in You", were later re-recorded by Hughes for his 1994 album From Now On....

In 2006 it was announced that a follow-up had been recorded, and was eventually slated for release in 2008. However, in June 2009, Glenn Hughes confirmed "I have put the Hughes/Thrall 2 project behind me. We started the album in 1997 and Pat Thrall wanted to produce it by himself. Ten years to produce an album? I usually take no more than six months. Let's move on with our lives."

== Track listing ==
No.	Title	Writer(s)	Length
1.	"I Got Your Number"	Glenn Hughes, Pat Thrall	3:37
2.	"The Look in Your Eye"	Hughes, Thrall	3:51
3.	"Beg, Borrow or Steal"	Hughes, Thrall	3:47
4.	"Where Did the Time Go"	Hughes, Thrall	2:59
5.	"Muscle and Blood"	Hughes, Thrall	4:21
6.	"Hold Out Your Life"	Hughes, Thrall	4:47
7.	"Who Will You Run To"	Hughes, Thrall	3:43
8.	"Coast to Coast" (Originally recorded by Trapeze)	Hughes	3:55
9.	"First Step of Love"	Hughes, Thrall	5:35

2007 Rock Candy Records remastered CD bonus tracks
No.	Title	Writer(s)	Length
10.	"Love Don't Come Easy"	Hughes, Thrall	5:49
11.	"Still the Night"	Hughes, Thrall, Paul Delph	3:50

== Personnel ==
- Glenn Hughes – vocals, bass
- Pat Thrall – guitar, guitar synthesizer
- Gary Ferguson – drums
- Frankie Banali – drums on "First Step of Love" and "Hold Out Your Life"
- Gary Mallaber – drums
- Peter Schless – keyboards
