= Feel (Glenn Hughes album) =

Studio album by Glenn Hughes
- Released: 7 June 1995
- Recorded: March–April 1995
- Genres: Funk, soul, pop, rock
- Length: 55:23
- Labels: SPV, Zero Corporation
- Producers: Glenn Hughes, Bruce Gowdy, Pat Thrall

Glenn Hughes chronology
From Now On... (1994)	Feel (1995)	Addiction (1996)

Professional ratings
Review scores
Source	Rating
Cross Rhythms	8/10 squares

Feel is the fourth studio album by former Deep Purple, Black Sabbath, and Trapeze vocalist and bassist Glenn Hughes. The album was released on 7 June 1995 by Zero Corporation and SPV.

== History ==
Feel is an album Hughes claims he made for himself, as he was "tired of being told what to do". It is distinctive to Hughes' other work in that the album has more of a pop, soul, and funk sound rather than the hard rock he is generally known for.

This album marks the first collaboration between Hughes and Pat Thrall since the 1982 Hughes/Thrall album, Thrall plays guitar on eight of the thirteen tracks and co-wrote two of them. Also performing on the album are former Guns N' Roses and Velvet Revolver drummer Matt Sorum, former Stevie Wonder keyboardist Greg Phillinganes and guitarists Bruce Gowdy and George Nastos.

This is the first solo studio album Hughes made that featured his bass playing on every track since 1977's Play Me Out.

Feel features a cover of the Stevie Wonder song "Maybe Your Baby" from Talking Book. The Japanese version of the album also includes a new recording of the Deep Purple track "Holy Man", which was originally released on Stormbringer.

== Track listing ==
1. "Big Time" – 4:59 (Hughes, Thrall)
2. "Livin' For The Minute" – 5:26 (Gowdy, Hughes)
3. "Does It Mean That Much To You?" – 5:42 (Hughes)
4. "Save Me Tonight (I'll Be Waiting)" – 4:15 (Hughes, Kentis, Rojas)
5. "Redline" – 4:53 (Hughes, Thrall)
6. "Coffee & Vanilla" – 5:59 (Hughes, Rojas)
7. "Push!" – 4:56 (Hughes)
8. "She Loves Your Money" – 4:38 (Allison, Gowdy, Hughes)
9. "Speak Your Mind" – 5:17 (Hughes, Rojas)
10. "Talkin' To Messiah" – 4:38 (Gowdy, Hughes)
11. "Maybe Your Baby" – 5:43 (Wonder)

=== Japanese bonus track ===
12. "Holy Man" – 4:20 (Coverdale, Hughes, Lord)

== Personnel ==
- Glenn Hughes – vocals, bass guitar
- Pat Thrall – guitars, keyboards (1, 3–8, 11)
- Bruce Gowdy – guitars, keyboards (2, 10)
- George Nastos – guitars (8, 9, 11, 12)
- Gary Ferguson – drums (all except 10)
- Matt Sorum – drums (10)
- Todd Hunter – keyboards (1, 3–5)
- Marc Hugenberger – keyboards (3, 4, 6–9, 12)
- Carmine Rojas – Keyboards (6, 9)
- Greg Phillinganes – keyboards (11)
- Pat Zicari – saxophone (4, 6, 8)
- Guy Allison – bass synthesizer (8)
