= Gnosis (Gnidrolog album) =

Studio album by Gnidrolog
- Released: 2000
- Recorded: 1999
- Studio: Select Sound Studios, Cairns, Australia; Music City Studios, London
- Genre: Progressive rock; World music; Soft rock; Rock
- Length: 74:10
- Label: Snails Records, Disques Rue Bis
- Producer: Nigel Pegrum, Nessa Glen

Gnidrolog chronology
Live 1972 (1999)	Gnosis (2000)

Professional ratings
Review scores
Source	Rating
Allmusic	link

Gnosis is the fourth album by the British progressive rock band, Gnidrolog. The album's title, Gnosis, means divine or spiritual knowledge and understanding. It is their third studio album and the first to be recorded in 27 years. The album was mostly recorded at Select Sound Studios, Cairns, Australia, where it was engineered and produced by Nigel Pegrum. "Repent Harlequin," "Two Helens," and the title track were all recorded at Music City Studios, London, engineered by Joe Suarez and produced by Nessa Glen, courtesy of Sarastro Music. The album was published mainly by Kempyre Music, except "Two Helens," which was published by Sarastro Music. Chris Copping of Procol Harum played his Hammond B3 Organ for a couple of tracks, which were recorded in Woodstock Studios, Melbourne and engineered by Tim Dudfield. Post-production is credited to David J Burrows and Stewart Goldring. The album was mastered by David J Burrows at Disques rue Bis. The album is noted to be eclectic not only for its transcontinental recording but also for the use of traditional instruments such as the Australian Aboriginal didgeridoos. The album marks the band's comeback, which had also prompted the release of the Live 1972 album. To release some of the Goldring brothers' original material, the album was a renewed cooperation with the other 1970s Gnidrolog members, with the addition of Rick Kemp of Steeleye Span and Nessa Glen.

== Album cover ==
The album cover contains a pyramid with the title inside, and in its bottom right-hand corner, two words appear: "prospice" and "respice."

== Track listing ==
No.	Title	Writer(s)	Length
1.	"Reach For Tomorrow"	Colin Goldring	5:14
2.	"Reverend Katz" (instrumental)	Colin Goldring	6:02
3.	"Fall To Ground"	Colin Goldring, Stewart Goldring	4:53
4.	"Woolunga" ("Safe Haven") (instrumental)	Stewart Goldring	4:23
5.	"Wonder Wonder"	Colin Goldring	4:42
6.	"Deventer" (instrumental)	Stewart Goldring	4:53
7.	"Bells Of Prozac" (instrumental)	Colin Goldring	6:27
8.	"Kings Of Rock"	Colin Goldring	6:50
9.	"Gnosis" (instrumental)	Colin Goldring	6:47
10.	"Crazy, Crazy"	Colin Goldring	4:31
11.	"Going To France"	Colin Goldring	4:42
12.	"The City Sleeps"	Stewart Goldring	4:42
13.	"Two Helens" (instrumental)	Colin Goldring	3:20
14.	"Repent Harlequin" (instrumental)	Stewart Goldring	6:30

== Personnel ==
- Colin Goldring - vocals, electric and acoustic guitar, recorders, harmonica, backing vocals
- Stewart Goldring - electric and classical guitars, backing vocals
- Rick Kemp - bass guitar, backing vocals
- Nigel Pegrum - drums, percussion, flutes
- Nessa Glen - Hammond organ, bowed glass samples, kalimba, keyboards, harpsichord, keyboard sitar

With

- David Hudson - didgeridoos on "Woolunga" ("Safe Haven")
- Ash Dargan - didgeridoos on "Bells of Prozac"
- Chris Copping - Hammond B3 organ on "Kings of Rock" and "Going to France"
