= Pat Thrall =

American rock guitarist

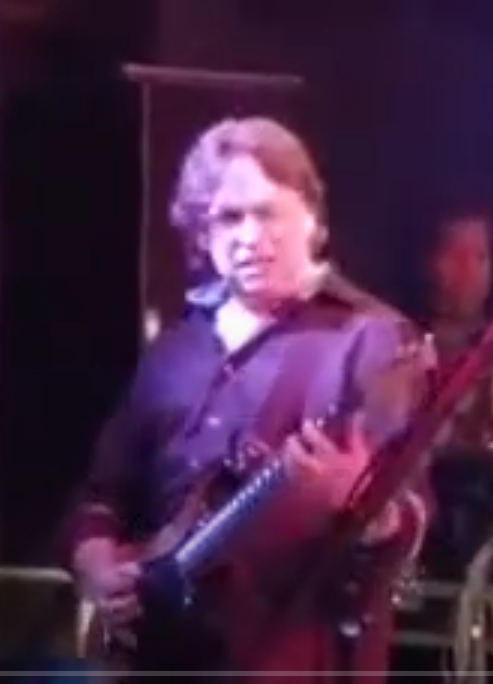
- Thrall as an onstage guest at a Glenn Hughes show in 2016.

Background information
- Genres: Rock
- Occupation: Musician
- Instrument: Guitar

Patrick Thrall is an American rock guitarist. Thrall has worked with former Deep Purple bassist Glenn Hughes on the Hughes/Thrall project.

== Discography ==
=== Cookin Mama ===
- New Day (guitar, vocals, percussion; 1972)

=== Stomu Yamashta ===
- Go (guitar; 1976)
- Go Live from Paris (guitar; 1976)

=== Delroy Washington ===
- "Generation Game", "Freedom Fighters" from I-Sus (lead guitar; 1976)

=== Automatic Man ===
- Automatic Man (guitar, vocals; 1976)
- Visitors (guitar; 1977)

=== Alphonso Johnson ===
- Spellbound (guitar; 1977)

=== Pat Travers Band ===
- Heat in the Street (guitar; 1978)
- Live! Go for What You Know (guitar; 1979)
- Crash and Burn (guitar; 1980)
- Radio Active (guitar; 1981)
- Live in Concert (guitar; 1980)

=== Hughes/Thrall ===
- Hughes/Thrall (guitar, guitar synthesizer; 1982)

=== Dan Aykroyd & Tom Hanks ===
- "City of Crime" from Dragnet (guitar; 1987)

=== Sly and Robbie ===
- Rhythm Killers (guitar; 1987)

=== Tina Turner ===
- Foreign Affair (guitar, 1989)

=== Asia ===
- Live in Moscow (guitar; 1990)
- Now (Nottingham Live) (guitar; 1990)

=== Meat Loaf ===
- Bat Out of Hell II: Back into Hell (guitar, percussion; 1992)
- Welcome to the Neighborhood (guitar; 1995)
- Live Around the World (guitar; 1996)

=== Glenn Hughes ===
- Feel (guitar, co-producer; 1995)

=== Praxis ===
- Mold (guitar; 1998)

=== Joe Satriani ===
- Engines of Creation (bass; 2000)

=== MTV's Wuthering Heights ===
- MTV's Wuthering Heights (guitar, co-producer; 2003)

=== Kim Plainfield & Lincoln Goines ===
- Night and Day (guitar; 2002)
