= Automatic Man =

American progressive rock band

- Origin: San Francisco, California, United States
- Genres: Progressive rock; space rock
- Years active: 1976–1978
- Label: Island Records
- Past members: Michael Shrieve; Bayete; Pat Thrall; Doni Harvey; Glenn Symmonds; Jerome Rimson

Automatic Man was an American rock band from San Francisco. The band consisted of musicians from rock, funk, and jazz backgrounds, and played progressive rock and space rock.

The group recorded two albums for Island Records before disbanding in 1977. They had one charting single, "My Pearl", which reached number 97 on the Billboard Hot 100 that same year.

== History ==
=== Formation ===
Automatic Man formed in San Francisco around 1975 after Michael Shrieve left his role as drummer with the band Santana to explore other musical avenues. Following his departure, Shrieve worked with Traffic and Spencer Davis Group singer/keyboardist Steve Winwood, percussionist Stomu Yamashta, and synthesizer player Klaus Schulze on the Go album, an experimental progressive rock album released by Island Records the following year. Pat Thrall was approached by Shrieve in 1975 to audition for a band he was forming with Todd Cochran.

Cochran, then known under the alias of "Bayeté", was a child prodigy and formally trained keyboard player who had attended the Trinity College of Music in England as a teenager. Cochran had already been part of the jazz scene for nearly a decade, playing with renowned jazz artists Bobby Hutcherson and Julian Priester. He also released two jazz-funk solo albums on Prestige Records in 1972 and 1973. Completing the lineup was bass guitarist Doni Harvey, who performed around the Bay Area with his brothers and in blues, jazz, and soul bands, playing both bass and guitar. According to Harvey's brother, Regi Harvey, Doni joined the band by chance:

During the break we heard a band practising in the big space. We went in to see who it was. It turned out to be "Automatic Man". That night the bass man wasn't working out and stomped out of the room. They spotted Don and asked him to sit in and to finish rehearsing. He stepped up to the plate that night. When they stopped for a break we went back in the small space we were practising in to finish. During that time they asked him to join the band. One of the reasons was that he played so well that they were that impressed. The other was that Doni and I had gone to Junior College with the keyboard player and main writer "Bayeté" at the newly opened "Skyline College".

After the band impressed Chris Blackwell, the president of Island Records, he signed them to a two-record deal.

=== Automatic Man and Visitors ===
7" single sleeve art for "My Pearl"

Rather than continue to build on their following in the San Francisco Bay Area, Automatic Man based themselves on King's Road in Chelsea, London. The group recorded at Basing Street Studios in Notting Hill, and Olympic Studios with renowned recording engineer Keith Harwood. In September 1976, the group released their self-titled debut album, Automatic Man, in the US. The album charted at number 120 on the Billboard Top LPs and Tape chart. The group's single "My Pearl" was released at the same time, and charted at number 97 on the Billboard Hot 100 in February 1977. In the United Kingdom, the album was promoted on BBC Radio 1 by Alan Freeman, who did the voiceover for the album ads that aired on the UK’s commercial radio stations.

Automatic Man promoted their debut album with appearances at a number of European music festivals, including the Montreux Jazz Festival in Switzerland. According to a later interview with Thrall, the band had trouble pulling off their material live. Part of the problem was that the technology of the era was too difficult to use for a live audience. Shrieve also alleged that the band had not had enough chances to play live.

The band was also feted by fellow artists and luminaries of the day, including the Rolling Stones and Hunter S. Thompson, who wrote a concert review. Although Automatic Man would make a few more live appearances in the Bay Area, a combination of infighting, clashes over music, and disagreements over the band's finances led to the original lineup dissolving after returning to the United States in 1976.

Album cover for Visitors

Shrieve and Harvey were replaced by bassist Jerome Rimson (also from the Go project) and drummer Glenn Symmonds. Billboard reported that Harvey had "departed due to illness". In 1977, the group released their second album, Visitors. The album charted at number 109 on the Billboard Top LPs and Tape chart. The band disbanded after the album's release.

All four members of the original Automatic Man lineup became solo and session musicians, with Shrieve and Cochran emerging as sought-after composers and arrangers. Lou CasaBianca, the band's manager and co-producer for the first disc, moved into video production and media technology writing. Glenn Symmonds and Jerome Rimson, drummer and bassist on Visitors respectively, continued on in the music industry to steady work and success as well.

Doni Harvey died on June 6, 2011.

== Discography ==
=== Albums ===
Title	Details	Peak chart positions
Title	Details	US
Automatic Man	Released: 1976; Label: Island	120
Visitors	Released: 1977; Label: Island	109

=== U.S. chart singles ===
- "My Pearl" (1977, No. 97)
