= Pat Travers =

Canadian rock musician (born 1954)

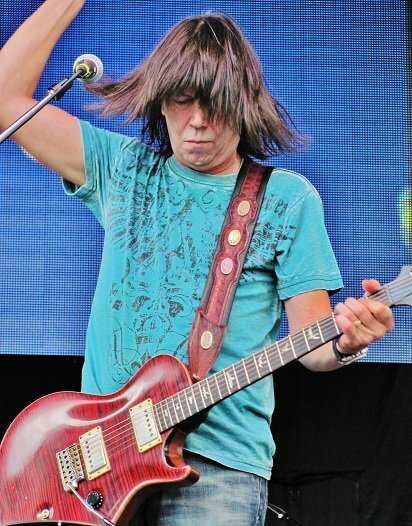
- Travers performing in 2014

Background information
- Born: Patrick Henry Travers; April 12, 1954 (age 72); Toronto, Ontario, Canada
- Genres: Hard rock; blues rock
- Occupations: Musician; singer; songwriter
- Instruments: Guitar; vocals; keyboards
- Years active: 1970–present
- Labels: Polydor; Lemon; Cleopatra
- Website: pattravers.com

Patrick Henry Travers (born April 12, 1954) is a Canadian rock guitarist, singer and songwriter who began his recording career in the mid-1970s.

== Early life ==
Travers was born and raised in Toronto. Soon after picking up the guitar at age 12, he saw Jimi Hendrix perform in Ottawa. Travers began playing in bands early in his teens; his first bands were the Music Machine (not to be confused with the Californian psychedelic/garage band of the same name), Red Hot, and Merge, which played in clubs in the Quebec area.

== Career ==
=== Early career ===
While performing with Merge, he was noticed by rock artist Ronnie Hawkins, who invited Travers to perform with him. In his early twenties, Travers moved to London and signed a recording contract with the Polydor label. His self-titled debut album was released in 1976 and featured bassist Peter "Mars" Cowling, who was a mainstay in Travers' band for several years. An appearance on the German TV show Rockpalast in November 1976 was later released on CD+DVD under the title Live at Rockpalast – Cologne 1976 in 2017. This performance showcases an early version of Travers' band featuring Cowling and drummer Nicko McBrain.

=== Rise to popularity ===
During 1977, Travers added a second guitarist to his band, changed drummers twice including using Clive Edwards, and by the time Heat in the Street was released in 1978 had put together the Pat Travers Band. This grouping featured Travers on vocals and guitar, Pat Thrall on guitar, Cowling on bass, and Tommy Aldridge on drums and percussion. The band toured heavily, also supporting Rush on their Drive til You Die tour in support of A Farewell to Kings.

The guitar Travers most often appeared with on stage and on album covers in the band's early years was a 1964/65 model double cutaway, double humbucker pick-up Gibson Melody Maker. The band's next release was a live album titled Live! Go for What You Know, which charted in the Top 40 in the United States and included the tune "Boom Boom (Out Go the Lights)" (originally recorded by Little Walter, credited to Stan Lewis), which climbed even higher on the charts, entering the Top 20. "Snortin' Whiskey" was a major American radio hit from 1980's Crash and Burn.

After an appearance before 35,000 people at the Reading Music Festival in England, both Thrall and Aldridge announced they were leaving the band to pursue other projects. Travers and Cowling teamed up with drummer Sandy Gennaro and released Radio Active that same year. A co-headlining tour with Rainbow followed, and the two bands performed in major arenas across North America. Although the tour was Travers' most successful road outing, the Radio Active album barely made it into the Top 40, reaching only number 37.

It was very different from Travers' previous work, with more emphasis on keyboards than heavy guitars. Disappointed with the lack of sales, Polydor dropped Travers from their roster, and he in turn sued the record company on grounds that he was under contract with them to record more material. He won the lawsuit, and was able to release Black Pearl in 1982.

This release also featured more mainstream music rather than the hard-driving rock Travers had recorded earlier, and included the hit single "I La La La Love You", featured prominently on mainstream Top 40 and album oriented rock stations, and in the 1983 film Valley Girl. Hot Shot was Travers' last major label release of original music, and was a return to a harder-edge style of rock than his previous two albums had been. One of Travers' best-recorded projects, it went basically unnoticed and is best remembered for the single "Killer". It was during this time that Travers also released Just Another Killer Day, a 30-minute home video featuring music from Hot Shot that was a sci-fi type short story about sexy alien women searching for information on music here on earth. In 1984, Travers was again supporting Rush. Alex Lifeson is one of Travers' many admirers.

Before the release of Hot Shot, longtime bassist Cowling left the band, and Travers would work with several different bassists including Cliff Jordan and Donni Hughes until Cowling's return in 1989. Jerry Riggs, who had joined the Pat Travers Band in 1983, helped Travers create a guitar team that fans considered difficult to rival. After Hot Shot's release in 1984, Polydor made plans to issue a greatest hits package, and then ended their relationship with Travers.

The latter half of the 1980s were quite gruelling for Travers. Having entered the decade at the top of the music game, he found himself in 1986 without a record contract and being forced to earn a living once again playing nightclubs and touring constantly. By 1990, he had gained a deal with a small European label and released School of Hard Knocks. The project was completely ignored by radio. A full-length concert video, Boom Boom – Live at the Diamond Club 1990, was shot in Toronto, to be released on CD as Boom Boom next year, but Travers was still not able to return to the success he had ten years earlier, working only on indie labels, as with Lemon Recordings.

=== 1990s: Return to form ===
Shortly after, Travers signed a deal with U.S.-based Blues Bureau International Records, a company formed by producer Mike Varney. Travers' first recording for the label was Blues Tracks, released in 1992. Brad Russell, from Detroit, plays bass on Blues Tracks. Several more releases on the BBI label followed during the 1990s. In 1993, Travers parted company with both Jerry Riggs and Peter "Mars" Cowling, and Riggs was briefly replaced by former Foghat guitarist Erik Cartwright. The relationship was brief, and Travers has worked with a variety of musicians since that time. Travers sang on Boston metal band Extreme's song "Get the Funk Out" from their 1990 album Pornograffitti.

=== Decline in popularity ===
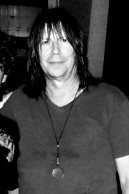
Travers in 2009

Travers has not been able to regain the level of commercial success he once had, despite a large and loyal fan base who call themselves "Hammer Heads". In 2001, Travers was part of the "Voices of Classic Rock" tour and had a minor hit with Leslie West from the band Mountain called "Rock Forever". In 2004, Travers started a project with veteran drummer Carmine Appice and started touring the U.S. Travers recorded cover tunes from bands such as Led Zeppelin, Montrose, Queen, and Trapeze under the album name P.T. Power Trio 2, and they toured Europe in November 2006. He has also performed with the band Scrap Metal.

2008 to 2016 featured one of the longest/most consistent line-ups for the Pat Travers Band. Joining Travers was Kirk McKim (2006–2015; guitar/vocals), Sean Shannon (2008–2010; drums), followed by Sandy Gennaro (2010–2016), and Rodney O'Quinn (2007–2016; bass/vocals). The band released the album Fidelis in late 2009. In July 2013, they released Can Do via Frontiers Records, a major label based in Italy. Can Do was supported by PTB tours of the U.S., the UK, and Europe during the later half of 2013. In January 2015, Frontiers Records released Live at the Iridium NYC, recorded in February 2012.

== Pat Travers Band members ==
A number of prominent musicians have performed with the Pat Travers Band, including Pat Thrall, Nicko McBrain, Clive Edwards, Mick Dyche, Tommy Aldridge, Peter "Mars" Cowling, Barry Dunaway, Jerry Riggs, Gunter Nezhoda, Carmine Appice, Michael Shrieve, Aynsley Dunbar, and Sandy Gennaro.

As of 2021, the band consists of Travers (guitars, vocals), Alex Petrosky (drums) and David Pastorius (bass).

== Acclaim ==
Paul Gilbert has referred to Travers as a "guitar god", and Kirk Hammett of Metallica has cited him as one of his favourite guitar players.

== In popular culture ==
"Rage of Travers", the ninth track on The Mountain Goats' 2017 album Goths, retells an incident in which Travers—on tour in 1982 or 1983—showed up, guitar in hand and looking to jam, at a Bauhaus concert after his own gig ended. The chorus, "Nobody wants to hear the 12-bar blues/from a guy in platform shoes", highlights the speed with which the commercial landscape of rock changed in the early 1980s, especially as MTV promoted more visually distinctive acts.

In the 2004 movie Sideways, the song "Snortin' Whiskey" is playing as Miles tries to recover Jack's wallet.

In the 1983 movie Valley Girl, the song "I La La La Love You" is playing when Randy, Julie, Fred and Stacey leave the party and head to Hollywood.

== Discography ==
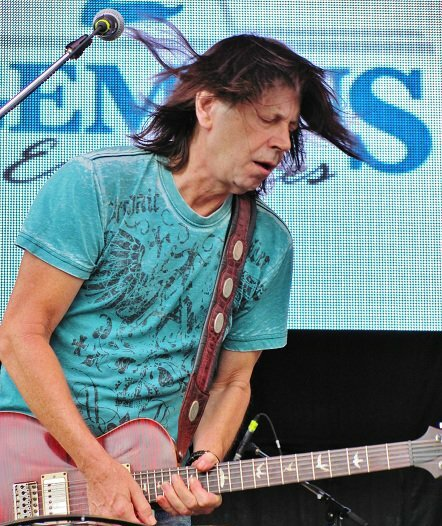
Travers in 2014

=== Albums ===
- 1976 Pat Travers
- 1977 Makin' Magic
- 1977 Putting It Straight
- 1978 Heat in the Street
- 1978 The Pat Travers You Missed Mini-Album (EP)
- 1979 Live! Go for What You Know
- 1980 Crash and Burn
- 1981 Radio Active
- 1982 Black Pearl
- 1984 Hot Shot
- 1990 School of Hard Knocks
- 1991 Boom Boom – Live at the Diamond Club, Toronto (live 1990)
- 1992 BBC Radio 1 Live in Concert (live 1977 and 1980; re-released in 2000)
- 1992 Blues Tracks
- 1993 Just a Touch
- 1994 Blues Magnet
- 1995 Halfway to Somewhere
- 1996 Lookin' Up
- 1997 King Biscuit Flower Hour (live 1984)
- 1998 Blues Tracks 2
- 2000 Don't Feed the Alligators
- 2003 Etched in Stone (live 2002; 2-CD)
- 2003 P.T. Power Trio (also called just... Power Trio)
- 2003 From the Front... Live! (live 1984; DVD-Audio)
- 2005 PT=MC2
- 2005 Boom Boom – Live at the Diamond Club 1990 (CD & DVD)
- 2006 Live – Hooked on Music (live 1976; DVD)
- 2006 P.T. Power Trio 2
- 2008 Stick with What You Know – Live in Europe (live 2007)
- 2009 Black Betty
- 2010 Fidelis
- 2012 Blues on Fire
- 2013 Live at the Bamboo Room (CD & DVD)
- 2013 Can Do
- 2014 Snortin' Whiskey at the Warfield (Official Bootleg)
- 2015 Live at the Iridium NYC
- 2015 Retro Rocket
- 2017 Live at Rockpalast – Cologne 1976 (live 1976; CD & DVD)
- 2019 Swing!
- 2019 Live in Concert – April 30th 1981 (Stanley Theatre, Pittsburgh)
- 2022 The Art of Time Travel
- 2023 Live at Reading 1980
- 2024 Live 'N' Loaded '84

=== Singles released during major label career ===
- 1976 "Makes No Difference" (promo single to debut album)
- 1976 "Stop and Smile"
- 1977 "Stevie"
- 1977 "Rock 'N' Roll Susie"
- 1977 "Gettin' Betta"
- 1977 "Life in London"
- 1978 "Heat in the Street"
- 1978 "Go All Night"
- 1979 "Boom, Boom (Out Go the Lights) – Live!" (UK single)
- 1980 "Is This Love" (US single)
- 1980 "Snortin' Whiskey" (US single)
- 1980 "Evie" (Netherlands only single)
- 1980 "Crash and Burn"
- 1980 "(Your Love) Can't Be Right"
- 1981 "My Life Is on the Line"
- 1981 "New Age Music" (Netherlands only single)
- 1981 "I Can Love You"
- 1982 "I La La La Love You"
- 1982 "Rockin'"
- 1982 "I'd Rather See You Dead"
- 1984 "Women on the Edge of Love"
- 1984 "Killer"

=== Compilation albums ===
- 1985 Boom Boom...The Best of Pat Travers
- 1990 An Anthology, Vol. 1
- 1990 An Anthology, Vol. 2
- 1991 The Best of Pat Travers
- 1997 Best of Blues Plus Live! (studio and 1997 live recordings)
- 2003 The Best of Pat Travers: 20th Century Masters/The Millennium Collection
- 2004 Rock Solid: The Essential Collection (Germany)
- 2007 Boom Boom (Out Go the Lights)
- 2008 8+8: The Best of '77–'80 (studio and 1979 live recordings) (Germany)
- 2009 Travelin' Blues
- 2015 Feelin' Right: The Polydor Albums 1975–1984 (Remastered)

=== Travers & Appice albums ===
- 2004 It Takes a Lot of Balls
- 2005 Live at the House of Blues
- 2005 Bazooka
- 2014 Live in Europe
- 2016 The Balls Album

=== Guest appearances ===
- 1977 Play Me Out (Glenn Hughes)
- 1983 Valley Girl (soundtrack)
- 1990 Pornografitti (Extreme; bridge vocals on "Get the Funk Out")
- 1993 L.A. Blues Authority, Vol. III: Hats Off to Stevie Ray (various artists)
- 1993 L.A. Blues Authority, Vol. IV: Fit for a King (various artists)
- 1993 Songs from the Better Blues Bureau (various artists)
- 1993 Masters of Metal – Live: The 70's – Ten Hits (various artists)
- 1994 L.A. Blues Authority, Vol. V: Cream of the Crop (various artists)
- 1995 Animal Magnetism (various artists)
- 1997 Summerdaze (live featuring John Kay & Steppenwolf, Blue Öyster Cult, Foghat, Pat Travers)
- 2001 Voices of Classic Rock: Voices for America (various artists)
- 2001 Building the Machine (Glenn Hughes)
- 2004 Sideways (soundtrack)
- 2006 Off The Shelf (Keith Emerson) (Travers on 2 tracks)
- 2009 Discovery (Chris Catena)
- 2010 Circus Bar (Brian Howe)
- 2012 Antiseptic Bloodbath (Tourniquet)
- 2012 Six String Soldiers (Frank Hannon)
- 2014 Primitive Son (Eli Cook)
- 2024 Temple of Blues (Cactus)
