= Peter "Mars" Cowling =

English bass guitarist (1946–2018)

Peter Cowling
- Born: 26 May 1946
- Origin: Grimsby, Lincolnshire, England
- Died: 20 March 2018 (aged 71)
- Occupation: Bassist

Peter "Mars" Cowling (26 May 1946 – 20 March 2018) was an English bass guitarist, best known for his work with Canadian blues rock guitarist Pat Travers.

Cowling for many years lived in Grimsby where, in 1962, he formed The Syndicate with Steve Mills on vocals, Frank Singleton on lead guitar, Doug Hollingworth rhythm guitar, Geoff Smith on piano, and John Smith on drums. This band played covers of tracks by Elmore James, Ray Charles, Rufus Thomas, Bobby Troup, and John Lee Hooker. After that, Cowling played in British groups including Gnidrolog and the Flying Hat Band, before joining forces with Pat Travers in 1975.

Cowling recorded eight albums for Travers from 1976 to 1982. He left Travers that year and later in the 1980s joined sisters Pam and Paula Mattioli in US AOR band Gypsy Queen (later to become Cell Mates in the early 1990s after Cowling's time in the band), appearing at the 1987 Reading Rock Festival and on Gypsy Queen's debut album before leaving the band later the same year. He rejoined Travers in 1989, and remained until 1993. He performed on Travers' singles "Boom Boom (Out Go The Lights)" and "Snortin' Whiskey". Cowling was also featured on two video releases. The first was Hooked On Music, a live performance originally shot for the German television programme, Rockpalast in 1976, which showcased an early line-up that also included Nicko McBrain. Cowling's other video appearance was Boom Boom-Live At The Diamond Club, a 1991 concert filmed in Toronto, that also featured Jerry Riggs.

Cowling died on 20 March 2018, after having been diagnosed in February with an aggressive form of Leukemia.
